= Kikwete Cabinet =

2006 cabinet of Tanzania

- 4th Cabinet of Tanzania

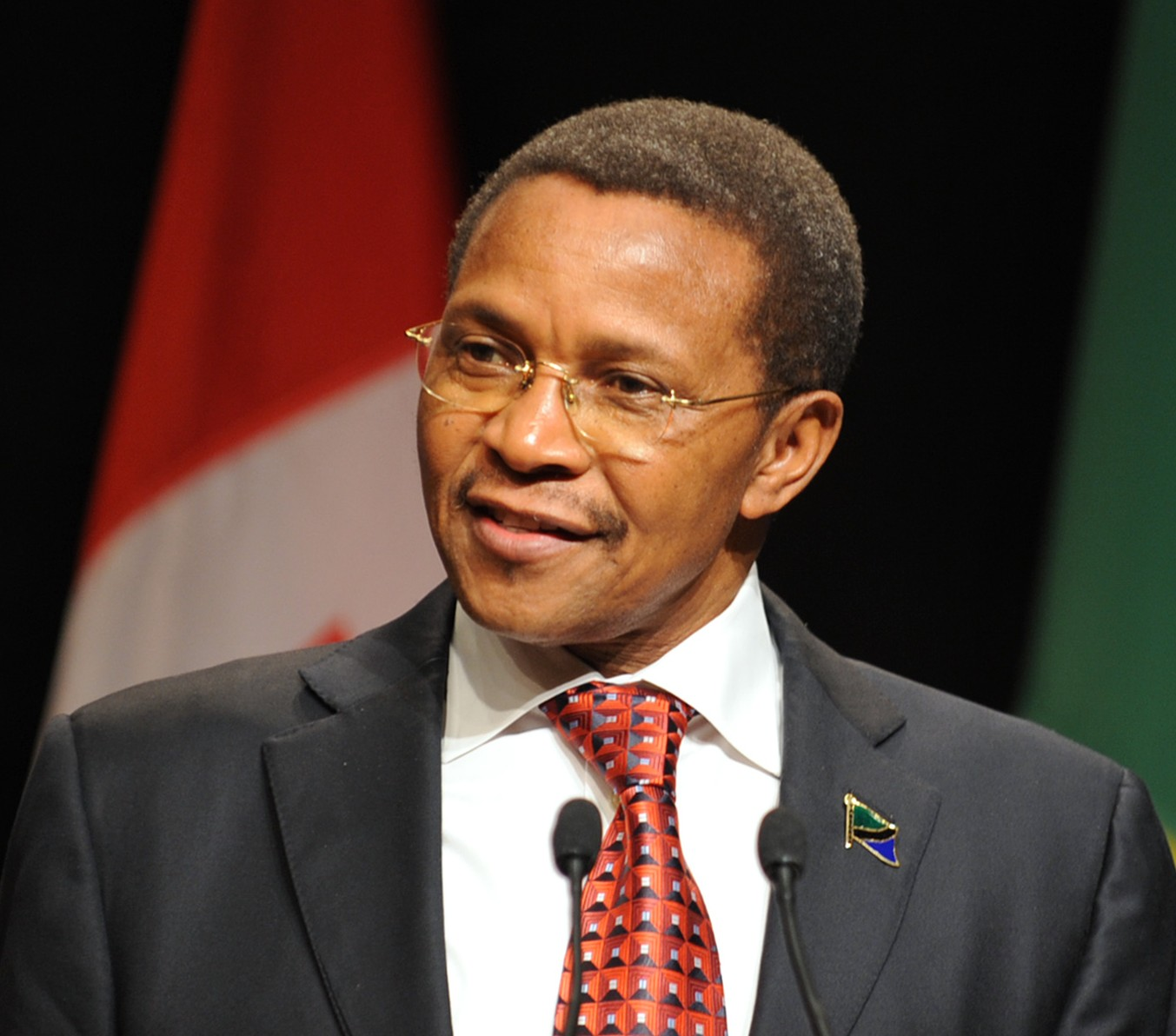
- Date formed: 6 January 2006
- Date dissolved: 5 November 2015

People and organisations
- Head of state: Jakaya Kikwete
- Head of government: Jakaya Kikwete
- No. of ministers: 31
- Member party: CCM
- Status in legislature: Majority
- Opposition party: CUF (2005–2010); CHADEMA (2010–)
- Opposition leader: Mr. Hamad Mohamed; Mr. Freeman Mbowe

History
- Election: 2005 general election
- Legislature term: 5 years
- Predecessor: Mkapa Cabinet
- Successor: Magufuli Cabinet

The Kikwete Cabinet was formed by President Jakaya Kikwete after taking the oath of office on 21 December 2005. Kikwete had won a landslide victory in the 2005 presidential election receiving 80.2 percent of the popular vote. His inaugural cabinet had seven women ministers, the highest in the nation's history.

== First term ==
=== Inaugural Cabinet ===
Kikwete's first appointment was Johnson Mwanyika as Attorney General. Mwanyika was sworn in on 24 December 2005. Edward Lowassa was then nominated as Prime Minister and was approved overwhelmingly by the National Assembly. He was sworn in on 30 December 2005; the same day President Kikwete inaugurated the 9th Parliament. The inaugural cabinet ministers took oath of office on 6 January 2006.

Party key
Chama Cha Mapinduzi

Cabinet of Tanzania: 6 January 2006 – 16 October 2006
Portfolio	Officeholder	Term
President; Commander-in-chief of the Armed Forces	H.E. Dr. Jakaya Kikwete	2005–
Vice President	H.E. Dr. Ali Mohamed Shein	2005–2010
Prime Minister	Rt. Hon Edward Lowassa MP	2005–2008
President of Zanzibar	H.E. Dr. Amani Abeid Karume	2000–2010
Ministers of State in the President's Office: Public Service Management; Good Governance; Politics and Public Relations	Hon. Hawa Ghasia MP; Hon. Philip Marmo MP; Hon. Kingunge Ngombale–Mwiru MP	2006–2012; 2006–2008; 2006–2008
Ministers of State in the Vice President's Office: Union Affairs; Environment	Hon. Dr. Hussein Mwinyi MP; Hon. Prof. Mark Mwandosya MP	2006–2008; 2006–2008
Ministers of State in the Prime Minister's Office: Regional Administration and Local Governments; Parliament Affairs	Hon. Mizengo Pinda MP; Hon. Juma Akukweti MP	2006–2008; 2006–2007
Minister of Agriculture, Food Security and Cooperatives	Hon. Joseph Mungai MP	2006–2006
Minister of Community Development, Gender and Children	Hon. Sofia Simba MP	2006–2008
Minister of Defence and National Service	Hon. Prof. Juma Kapuya MP	2006–2008
Minister of East African Cooperation	Hon. Andrew Chenge MP	2006–2006
Minister of Education and Vocational Training	Hon. Margaret Sitta MP	2006–2008
Minister of Energy and Minerals	Hon. Dr. Ibrahim Msabaha MP	2006–2006
Minister of Finance	Hon. Zakia Meghji MP	2006–2008
Minister of Foreign Affairs and International Co-operation	Hon. Dr. Asha-Rose Migiro MP	2006–2007
Minister of Health and Welfare Development	Hon. Prof. David Mwakyusa MP	2006–2010
Minister of Home Affairs	Hon. John Chiligati MP	2006–2006
Minister of Industry, Trade and Marketing	Hon. Nazir Karamagi MP	2006–2006
Minister of Information, Culture and Sports	Hon. Muhammed Seif Khatib MP	2006–2008
Minister of Infrastructure Development	Hon. Basil Mramba MP	2006–2006
Minister of Justice and Constitution Affairs	Hon. Dr. Mary Nagu MP	2006–2008
Minister of Labour, Employment and Youth Development	Hon. Prof. Jumanne Maghembe MP	2006–2006
Minister of Lands and Human Settlements Development	Hon. John Magufuli MP	2006–2008
Minister of Livestock Development	Hon. Dr. Shukuru Kawambwa MP	2006–2006
Minister of Natural Resources and Tourism	Hon. Anthony Diallo MP	2006–2006
Minister of Planning, Economy and Empowerment	Hon. Juma Ngasongwa MP	2006–2008
Minister of Public Safety and Security	Hon. Bakari Mwapachu MP	2006–2008
Minister of Science, Technology and Higher Education	Hon. Prof. Peter Msola MP	2006–2008
Minister of Water	Hon. Stephen Wassira MP	2006–2006
Also attending Cabinet meetings (excluding voting rights)
Attorney General	Hon. Justice Johnson Mwanyika	2005–2009

=== First reshuffle ===
President Kikwete made his first cabinet reshuffle in October 2006 which resulted in ten ministers swapping their portfolios. The energy crisis at the time may have necessitated the President's decision.

Key		Chama Cha Mapinduzi
	Cabinet reshuffle	

Cabinet of Tanzania: 16 October 2006 – 13 February 2008
Portfolio	Officeholder	Term
President; Commander-in-chief of the Armed Forces	H.E. Dr. Jakaya Kikwete	2005–
Vice President	H.E. Dr. Ali Mohamed Shein	2005–2010
Prime Minister	Rt. Hon Edward Lowassa MP	2005–2008
President of Zanzibar	H.E. Dr. Amani Abeid Karume	2000–2010
Ministers of State in the President's Office: Public Service Management; Good Governance; Politics and Public Relations	Hon. Hawa Ghasia MP; Hon. Philip Marmo MP; Hon. Kingunge Ngombale–Mwiru MP	2006–2012; 2006–2008; 2006–2008
Ministers of State in the Vice President's Office: Union Affairs; Environment	Hon. Dr. Hussein Mwinyi MP; Hon. Prof. Mark Mwandosya MP	2006–2008; 2006–2008
Ministers of State in the Prime Minister's Office: Regional Administration and Local Governments; Parliament Affairs	Hon. Mizengo Pinda MP; Hon. Juma Akukweti MP	2006–2008; 2006–2007
Minister of Agriculture, Food Security and Cooperatives	Hon. Stephen Wassira MP	2006–2008
Minister of Community Development, Gender and Children	Hon. Sofia Simba MP	2006–2008
Minister of Defence and National Service	Hon. Prof. Juma Kapuya MP	2006–2008
Minister of East African Cooperation	Hon. Dr. Ibrahim Msabaha MP	2006–2008
Minister of Education and Vocational Training	Hon. Margaret Sitta MP	2006–2008
Minister of Energy and Minerals	Hon. Nazir Karamagi MP	2006–2008
Minister of Finance	Hon. Zakia Meghji MP	2006–2008
Minister of Foreign Affairs and International Co-operation	Hon. Dr. Asha-Rose Migiro MP	2006–2007
Minister of Health and Welfare Development	Hon. Prof. David Mwakyusa MP	2006–2010
Minister of Home Affairs	Hon. Joseph Mungai MP	2006–2008
Minister of Industry, Trade and Marketing	Hon. Basil Mramba MP	2006–2008
Minister of Information, Culture and Sports	Hon. Muhammed Seif Khatib MP	2006–2008
Minister of Infrastructure Development	Hon. Andrew Chenge MP	2006–2008
Minister of Justice and Constitution Affairs	Hon. Dr. Mary Nagu MP	2006–2008
Minister of Labour, Employment and Youth Development	Hon. John Chiligati MP	2006–2008
Minister of Lands and Human Settlements Development	Hon. John Magufuli MP	2006–2008
Minister of Livestock Development	Hon. Anthony Diallo MP	2006–2008
Minister of Natural Resources and Tourism	Hon. Prof. Jumanne Maghembe MP	2006–2008
Minister of Planning, Economy and Empowerment	Hon. Juma Ngasongwa MP	2006–2008
Minister of Public Safety and Security	Hon. Bakari Mwapachu MP	2006–2008
Minister of Science, Technology and Higher Education	Hon. Prof. Peter Msola MP	2006–2008
Minister of Water	Hon. Dr. Shukuru Kawambwa MP	2006–2008
Also attending Cabinet meetings (excluding voting rights)
Attorney General	Hon. Justice Johnson Mwanyika	2005–2009

==== Changes ====
- Juma Akukweti died on 4 January 2007. He was seriously injured when the small aircraft he was travelling en route to Dar es Salaam crashed in Mbeya shortly after takeoff.
- Asha-Rose Migiro was appointed by Ban Ki-moon as the Deputy Secretary-General of the United Nations on 5 January 2007. She was succeeded by Bernard Membe, the Deputy Minister of Energy and Minerals.

=== Second reshuffle ===
Party key
Chama Cha Mapinduzi

Cabinet of Tanzania: 13 February 2008 – 28 November 2010
Portfolio	Officeholder	Term
President; Commander-in-chief of the Armed Forces	H.E. Dr. Jakaya Kikwete	2005–
Vice President	H.E. Dr. Ali Mohamed Shein	2005–2010
Prime Minister	Rt. Hon Mizengo Pinda MP	2008–
President of Zanzibar	H.E. Dr. Amani Abeid Karume	2000–2010
Ministers of State in the President's Office: Good Governance; Public Service Management	Hon. Sophia Simba MP; Hon. Hawa Ghasia MP	2008–2010; 2006–2012
Ministers of State in the Vice President's Office: Union Affairs; Environment	Hon. Muhammed Seif Khatib MP; Hon. Prof. Batilda Burian MP	2008–2010; 2008–2010
Ministers of State in the Prime Minister's Office: Policy, Coordination and Parliamentary Affairs; Local Government and Regional Administration	Hon. Philip Marmo MP; Hon. Stephen Wassira MP	2008–2010; 2008–2010
Minister of Agriculture, Food Security and Cooperatives	Hon. Peter Msolla MP	2008–2010
Minister of Community Development, Gender and Children	Hon. Margaret Sitta MP	2008–2010
Minister of Defence and National Service	Hon. Prof. Hussein Mwinyi MP	2008–2012
Minister of East African Cooperation	Hon. Diodorus Kamala MP	2008–2010
Minister of Education	Hon. Jumanne Maghembe MP	2008–2010
Minister of Energy and Minerals	Hon. William Ngeleja MP	2008–2012
Minister of Planning and Finance	Hon. Mustafa Mkullo MP	2008–2012
Minister of Foreign Affairs and International Co-operation	Hon. Bernard Membe MP	2007–
Minister of Health and Social Welfare	Hon. Prof. David Mwakyusa MP	2006–2010
Minister of Home Affairs	Hon. Lawrence Masha MP	2008–2010
Minister of Industry, Trade and Marketing	Hon. Mary Nagu MP	2008–2010
Minister of Information, Culture and Sports	Hon. George Mkuchika MP	2008–2010
Minister of Infrastructure Development	Hon. Andrew Chenge MP	2008–2008
Minister of Justice and Constitution Affairs	Hon. Mathias Chikawe MP	2008–2010
Minister of Labour, Employment and Youth Development	Hon. Prof. Juma Kapuya MP	2008–2010
Minister of Lands, Housing and Human Settlements	Hon. John Chiligati MP	2008–2010
Minister of Livestock and Fisheries Development	Hon. John Magufuli MP	2008–2010
Minister of Natural Resources and Tourism	Hon. Shamsa Mwangunga MP	2008–2010
Minister of Planning, Economy and Empowerment	Hon. Juma Ngasongwa MP	2006–2008
Minister of Public Safety and Security	Hon. Bakari Mwapachu MP	2006–2008
Minister of Science, Communication and Technology	Hon. Prof. Shukuru Kawambwa MP	2008–2008
Minister of Water and Irrigation Development	Hon. Mark Mwandosya MP	2008–2010
Also attending Cabinet meetings (excluding voting rights)
Attorney General	Hon. Justice Johnson Mwanyika	2005–2009

==== Changes ====
Attorney General Johnson Mwanyika was succeeded by Frederick Werema in 2009.

== Second term ==
=== November 2010 – May 2012 ===
Party key
Chama Cha Mapinduzi

Cabinet of Tanzania: 28 November 2010 – 7 May 2012
Portfolio	Officeholder	Term
President; Commander-in-chief of the Armed Forces	H.E. Dr. Jakaya Kikwete	2005–
Vice President	H.E. Dr. Mohamed Gharib Bilal	2010–
Prime Minister	Rt. Hon Mizengo Pinda MP	2008–
President of Zanzibar	H.E. Dr. Ali Mohamed Shein	2010–
Ministers of State in the President's Office: Good Governance; Social Relations and Co-ordination; Public Service and Management	Hon. Mathias Chikawe MP; Hon. Stephen Wasira MP; Hon. Hawa Ghasia MP	2010–2012; 2010– 2006–2012
Ministers of State in the Vice President's Office: Union Affairs; Environment	Hon. Samia Suluhu MP; Hon. Terezya Huvisa MP	2010– 2010–
Ministers of State in the Prime Minister's Office: Policy, Co-ordination and Parliamentary Affairs; Investment and Empowerment; Regional Administration and Local Government	Hon. William Lukuvi MP; Hon. Mary Nagu MP; Hon. George Mkuchika MP	2010– 2010– 2010–2012
Minister of Agriculture, Food Security and Cooperatives	Hon. Jumanne Magufuli MP	2010–2012
Minister of Community Development, Gender and Children	Hon. Sofia Simba MP	2010–
Minister of Communication, Science and Technology	Hon. Makame Mbarawa MP	2010–
Minister of Defence and National Service	Hon. Dr. Hussein Mwinyi MP	2010–2012
Minister of East African Cooperation	Hon. Samuel Sitta MP	2010–
Minister of Education and Vocational Training	Hon. Shukuru Kawambwa MP	2010–
Minister of Energy and Minerals	Hon. William Ngeleja MP	2008–2012
Minister of Finance	Hon. Mustafa Mkulo MP	2008–2012
Minister of Foreign Affairs and International Co-operation	Hon. Bernard Membe MP	2007–
Minister of Health and Welfare Development	Hon. Dr. Hadji Mponda MP	2010–2012
Minister of Home Affairs	Hon. Shamsi Vuai Nahodha MP	2010–2012
Minister of Industry and Marketing	Hon. Cyril Chami MP	2010–2012
Minister of Information, Culture and Sports	Hon. Emmanuel Nchimbi MP	2010–2012
Minister of Infrastructure Development	Hon. Basil Mramba MP	2006–2006
Minister of Justice and Constitution Affairs	Hon. Celina Kombani MP	2010–2012
Minister of Labour, Employment and Youth Development	Hon. Gaudensia Kabaka MP	2010–
Minister of Lands, Housing and Human Settlements	Hon. Anna Tibaijuka MP	2010–
Minister of Livestock and Fisheries Development	Hon. Dr. David Mathayo David MP	2010–
Minister of Natural Resources and Tourism	Hon. Ezekiel Maige MP	2010–2012
Minister of Planning, Economy and Empowerment	Hon. Juma Ngasongwa MP	2006–2008
Minister of Public Safety and Security	Hon. Bakari Mwapachu MP	2006–2008
Minister of Science, Technology and Higher Education	Hon. Prof. Peter Msola MP	2006–2008
Minister of Transport	Hon. Omari Nundu MP	2010–2012
Minister of Water	Hon. Mark Mwandosya MP	2010–2012
Minister of Works	Hon. John Magufuli MP	2010–
Also attending Cabinet meetings (excluding voting rights)
Attorney General	Hon. Justice Johnson Mwanyika	2005–2009

=== May 2012 – January 2014 ===
Party key
Chama Cha Mapinduzi

Cabinet of Tanzania: 7 May 2012 – 20 January 2014
Portfolio	Incumbent	Term
President; Commander-in-chief of the Armed Forces	Jakaya Kikwete	2005–
Vice President	Mohamed Gharib Bilal	2010–
President of Zanzibar	Ali Mohamed Shein	2010–
Prime Minister	Mizengo Pinda MP	2008–
Ministers of State in the President's Office: Social Relations and Co-ordination; Good Governance; Public Service Management	Stephen Wassira MP; George Mkuchika MP; Celina Kombani MP	2010– 2012– 2012–
Ministers of State in the Vice President's Office: Union Affairs; Environment	Samia Suluhu MP; Terezya Huvisa MP	2010– 2010–2014
Ministers of State in the Prime Minister's Office: Regional Administration and Local Government; Policy, Co-ordination and Parliamentary Affairs; Investment and Empowerment	Hawa Ghasia MP; William Lukuvi MP; Mary Nagu MP	2012– 2010– 2010–
Minister of Agriculture, Food Security and Cooperatives	Christopher Chiza MP	2012–
Minister of Community Development, Gender and Children	Sophia Simba MP	2010–
Minister of Communication, Science & Technology	Makame Mbarawa MP	2010–
Minister of Defence and National Service	Shamsi Vuai Nahodha MP	2012–2013
Minister of East African Cooperation	Samuel Sitta MP	2010–
Minister of Education and Vocational Training	Shukuru Kawambwa MP	2010–
Minister of Energy and Minerals	Sospeter Muhongo MP	2012–
Minister of Finance and Economic Affairs	William Mgimwa MP	2012–2014
Minister of Foreign Affairs and International Co-operation	Bernard Membe MP	2007–
Minister of Health and Social Welfare	Hussein Mwinyi MP	2012–2014
Minister of Home Affairs	Emmanuel Nchimbi MP	2012–2013
Minister of Industry, Trade and Marketing	Abdallah Kigoda MP	2012–
Minister of Information, Youth, Culture and Sports	Fenella Mukangara MP	2012–
Minister of Justice and Constitutional Affairs	Mathias Chikawe MP	2012–2014
Minister of Labour and Employment	Gaudensia Kabaka MP	2010–
Minister of Lands, Housing and Human Settlements	Anna Tibaijuka MP	2010–
Minister of Livestock Development and Fisheries	David Mathayo David MP	2010–2013
Minister of Natural Resources and Tourism	Khamis Kagasheki MP	2012–2013
Minister of Transport	Harrison Mwakyembe MP	2012–
Minister of Water and Irrigation	Jumanne Maghembe MP	2012–
Minister of Works	John Magufuli MP	2010–
Minister without Portfolio	Mark Mwandosya MP	2012–
Also attending Cabinet meetings (excluding voting rights)
Attorney General	Frederick Werema	2009–

=== January 2014–January 2015 ===
Party key
Chama Cha Mapinduzi

Cabinet of Tanzania: 20 January 2014 – 24 January 2015
Portrait	Portfolio	Incumbent	Term
	President; Commander-in-chief of the Armed Forces	Jakaya Kikwete	2005–
	Vice President	Mohamed Gharib Bilal	2010–
	President of Zanzibar (Semi-autonomous region)	Ali Mohamed Shein	2010–
	Prime Minister	Mizengo Pinda MP	2008–
	Minister of Agriculture, Food Security and Cooperatives	Christopher Chiza MP	2012–
	Minister of Communication, Science & Technology	Makame Mbarawa MP	2010–
	Minister of Community Development, Gender and Children	Sophia Simba MP	2010–
	Minister of Defence and National Service	Hussein Mwinyi MP	2014–
	Minister of East African Cooperation	Samuel Sitta MP	2010–
	Minister of Education and Vocational Training	Shukuru Kawambwa MP	2010–
	Minister of Energy and Minerals	vacant	
	Minister of Finance and Economic Affairs	Saada Salum MP	2014–
	Minister of Foreign Affairs and International Co-operation	Bernard Membe MP	2007–
	Minister of Health and Social Welfare	Seif Rashidi MP	2014–
	Minister of Home Affairs	Mathias Chikawe MP	2014–
	Minister of Industry and Trade	Abdallah Kigoda MP	2012–
	Minister of Information, Youth, Culture and Sports	Fenella Mukangara MP	2012–
	Minister of Justice and Constitutional Affairs	Asha-Rose Migiro MP	2014–
	Minister of Labour and Employment	Gaudensia Kabaka MP	2010–
	Minister of Lands, Housing and Human Settlements	vacant	
	Minister of Livestock Development and Fisheries	Titus Kamani MP	2014–
	Minister of Natural Resources and Tourism	Lazaro Nyalandu MP	2014–
	Minister of Transport	Harrison Mwakyembe MP	2012–
	Minister of Water and Irrigation	Jumanne Maghembe MP	2012–
	Minister of Works	John Magufuli MP	2010–
Ministers of State in the President's Office:
	Good Governance	George Mkuchika MP	2012–
	Public Service Management	Celina Kombani MP	2012–
	Social Relations and Co-ordination	Stephen Wassira MP	2010–
	Minister without Portfolio	Mark Mwandosya MP	2012–
Ministers of State in the Vice President's Office
	Environment	Binilith Mahenge MP	2014–
	Union Affairs	Samia Suluhu MP	2010–
Ministers of State in the Prime Minister's Office:
	Investment and Empowerment	Mary Nagu MP	2010–
	Policy, Co-ordination and Parliamentary Affairs	William Lukuvi MP	2010–
	Regional Administration and Local Government	Hawa Ghasia MP	2012–
Also attending Cabinet meetings (excluding voting rights)
	Attorney General	George Masaju	2015–

==== Changes ====
- Attorney General Frederick Werema resigned on 16 December 2014 after he was accused of authorizing the transfer of about $120 million from a controversial escrow account. Werema stated that his advice had been misunderstood. He was replaced by George Masaju.
- On 22 December 2014, President Kikwete sacked Lands Minister Anna Tibaijuka over a $1 million donation for a school that she received in her personal account. Tibaijuka denied any wrongdoing and insisted that she presented the funds to the school.

=== January–November 2015 ===
Party key
Chama Cha Mapinduzi

Cabinet of Tanzania: 24 January 2015 – December 2015
Portrait	Portfolio	Incumbent	Term
	President; Commander-in-chief of the Armed Forces	Jakaya Kikwete	2005–2015
	Vice President	Mohamed Gharib Bilal	2010–2015
	President of Zanzibar (Semi-autonomous region)	Ali Mohamed Shein	2010–2015
	Prime Minister	Mizengo Pinda MP	2008–2015
	Minister of Agriculture, Food Security and Cooperatives	Stephen Wassira MP	2015–2015
	Minister of Communication, Science & Technology	Makame Mbarawa MP	2010–2015
	Minister of Community Development, Gender and Children	Sophia Simba MP	2010–2015
	Minister of Defence and National Service	Hussein Mwinyi MP	2014–2015
	Minister of East African Cooperation	Harrison Mwakyembe MP	2015–2015
	Minister of Education and Vocational Training	Shukuru Kawambwa MP	2010–2015
	Minister of Energy and Minerals	George Simbachawene MP	2015–2015
	Minister of Finance and Economic Affairs	Saada Salum MP	2014–2015
	Minister of Foreign Affairs and International Co-operation	Bernard Membe MP	2007–2015
	Minister of Health and Social Welfare	Seif Rashidi MP	2014–2015
	Minister of Home Affairs	Mathias Chikawe MP	2014–2015
	Minister of Industry and Trade	Abdallah Kigoda MP	2012–2015
	Minister of Information, Youth, Culture and Sports	Fenella Mukangara MP	2012–2015
	Minister of Justice and Constitutional Affairs	Asha-Rose Migiro MP	2014–2015
	Minister of Labour and Employment	Gaudensia Kabaka MP	2010–2015
	Minister of Lands, Housing and Human Settlements	William Lukuvi MP	2015–2015
	Minister of Livestock Development and Fisheries	Titus Kamani MP	2014–2015
	Minister of Natural Resources and Tourism	Lazaro Nyalandu MP	2014–2015
	Minister of Transport	Samuel Sitta MP	2015–2015
	Minister of Water and Irrigation	Jumanne Maghembe MP	2012–2015
	Minister of Works	John Magufuli MP	2010–2015
Ministers of State in the President's Office:
	Good Governance	George Mkuchika MP	2012–2015
	Public Service Management	Celina Kombani MP	2012–2015
	Social Relations and Co-ordination	Mary Nagu MP	2015–2015
	Minister without Portfolio	Mark Mwandosya MP	2012–2015
Ministers of State in the Vice President's Office
	Environment	Binilith Mahenge MP	2014–2015
	Union Affairs	Samia Suluhu MP	2010–2015
Ministers of State in the Prime Minister's Office:
	Investment and Empowerment	Christopher Chiza MP	2015–2015
	Policy, Co-ordination and Parliamentary Affairs	Jenista Mhagama	2015–2015
	Regional Administration and Local Government	Hawa Ghasia MP	2012–2015
Also attending Cabinet meetings (excluding voting rights)
	Attorney General	George Masaju	2015–2015

=== Deputy Ministers ===
Deputy Ministers
Portrait	Portfolio	Incumbent	Term
	Ministries of State in the Vice President's Office Environment	Ummy Mwalimu	2014–
	Ministries of State in the Prime Minister's Office Regional Administration and Local Government	Aggrey Mwanri; Majaliwa K. Majaliwa	2010– 2010–
	Ministry of Agriculture, Food Security and Cooperatives	Godfrey Zambi	2014–
	Ministry of Communication, Science and Technology	January Makamba	2012–
	Ministry of Community Development, Gender and Children	Pindi Chana	2014–
	Ministry of Defence and National Service		
	Ministry of East African Cooperation	Abdulla Saadalla	2010–
	Ministry of Education and Vocational Training	Jenista Mhagama	2014–
	Ministry of Energy and Minerals	Stephen Masele (Minerals); Charles Kitwanga (Energy)	2012– 2014–
	Ministry of Finance and Economic Affairs	Mwigulu Nchemba (Finance); Adam Malima	2014– 2014–
	Ministry of Foreign Affairs and International Co-operation	Mahadhi Maalim	2010–
	Ministry of Health and Social Welfare	Stephen Kebwe	2014–
	Ministry of Home Affairs	Pereira Silima	2012–
	Ministry of Industry, Trade and Marketing	Janet Mbene	2014–
	Ministry of Information, Youth, Culture and Sports	Juma Nkamia	2014–
	Ministry of Justice and Constitution Affairs	Angellah Kairuki	2012–
	Ministry of Labour and Employment	Milton Mahanga	2010–
	Ministry of Lands, Housing and Human Settlements Developments	George Simbachawene	2014–
	Ministry of Livestock and Fisheries Development	Kaika Telele	2014–
	Ministry of Natural Resources and Tourism	Mahmoud Mgimwa	2014–
	Ministry of Transport	Charles Tizeba	2012–
	Ministry of Water and Irrigation	Amos Makalla	2014–
	Ministry of Works	Gerson Lwenge	2012–
