= Milton Mahanga =

Tanzanian politician

Honourable Milton Mahanga MP

Deputy Minister of Labour and Employment
- Incumbent
- Assumed office 28 November 2010
- Minister: Gaudensia Kabaka

Deputy Minister of Labour, Employment and Youth Development
- In office 13 February 2008 – 28 November 2010
- Minister: Juma Kapuya

Deputy Minister of Infrastructure Development
- In office 6 January 2006 – 13 February 2008
- Minister: Basil Mramba; Andrew Chenge

Member of Parliament for Segerea
- Incumbent
- Assumed office November 2010

Member of Parliament for Ukonga
- In office November 2000 – 16 July 2010
- Succeeded by: Eugen Mwaiposa

Personal details
- Born: 3 April 1955 (age 71) Tanganyika
- Died: 24 March 2020
- Party: CCM
- Education: IFM (Dip); University of Strathclyde (MSc)
- Profession: Certified Public Accountant

Milton Makongoro Mahanga (born 3 April 1955) is a Tanzanian CCM politician and Member of Parliament for Segerea constituency since 2010. He is the current Deputy Minister of Labour and Employment.
