= Minister of State for Environment (Tanzania) =

- Waziri wa Nchi (Mazingira) (Swahili)

- Incumbent; Binilith Mahenge since 20 January 2014
- State Ministry for Environment
- Style: Honourable Minister
- Member of: Cabinet
- Seat: Dar es Salaam, Tanzania
- Appointer: President
- Term length: At the President's discretion
- Website: www.vpo.go.tz

The Minister of State for Environment is the head of the State Ministry in the Vice President's Office for Environment of the Government of Tanzania.

== List of ministers ==
The following have served the ministry:

Party

CCM

#	Portrait	Minister	Portfolio	Took office	Left office	President
		Edward Lowassa	Environment & Poverty	1997	2000	Benjamin Mkapa
		Arcado Ntagazwa	Union Affairs and Environment	2000	2005	Benjamin Mkapa
1		Mark Mwandosya	Environment	2006	2008	Jakaya Kikwete
2		Batilda Burian	Environment	2008	2010	Jakaya Kikwete
3		Terezya Huvisa	Environment	2010	2014	Jakaya Kikwete
4		Binilith Mahenge	Environment	2014	2016	Jakaya Kikwete
5		January Makamba	Environment	2016	Incumbent	Dr. John Pombe Magufuli
