= Minister of Industry and Trade (Tanzania) =

Minister in Tanzania

- Waziri wa Viwanda na Biashara

- Incumbent; Ashatu Kijaji since 10 January 2022
- Ministry of Industry, Trade & Investment
- Style: Honourable Minister
- Member of: Cabinet
- Seat: Dar es Salaam, Tanzania
- Appointer: President
- Term length: At the President's discretion
- Website: www.mit.go.tz

The Minister of Industry and Trade is the head of the Ministry of Industry and Trade of the Government of Tanzania.

== History ==
Previously, the industry and trade portfolios existed under separate ministries before being amalgamated into its present form.

== List of ministers ==
The following have served the ministry:

Parties

TANU CCM

#	Portrait	Minister	Portfolio	Took office	Left office	President
–		G. Kahama	Trade and Industry	1962	1964	(Republic of Tanganyika)
		J. S. Kasambala	Trade and Cooperatives	1964	1965	Julius Nyerere
		A. K. Hanga	Industry, Minerals and Electricity	1964	1965	Julius Nyerere
		J. S. Kasambala	Industry, Minerals and Energy	1965	1966	Julius Nyerere
		Abdulrahman Mohamed Babu	Trade and Cooperatives	1965	1966	Julius Nyerere
		A. Z. Nsilo Swai	Industry, Minerals and Electricity	1966	1967	Julius Nyerere
1		A. M. Maalim	Trade and Industry	1967	1971	Julius Nyerere
2		Paul Bomani	Trade and Industry	1971	1974	Julius Nyerere
3		Amir H. Jamal	Trade and Industry	1974	1976	Julius Nyerere
		Cleopa Msuya	Industry	1976	1982	Julius Nyerere
		A. Rulegura	Trade	1976	1982	Julius Nyerere
		A. S. Mchumo	Trade	1982	1983	Julius Nyerere
.		Mustafa Nyang'anyi	Trade	1983	1986	Julius Nyerere
		Mustafa Nyang'anyi	Trade	1983	1986	Ali Hassan Mwinyi
4		Basil Mramba	Industry and Trade	1986	1989	Ali Hassan Mwinyi
5		J. C. Rwegasira	Industry and Trade	1989	1990	Ali Hassan Mwinyi
6		Cleopa Msuya	Industry and Trade	1990	1995	Ali Hassan Mwinyi
7		William Shija	Industry and Trade	1995	2001	Benjamin Mkapa
8		Abdallah Kigoda	Industry and Trade	1996	1997	Benjamin Mkapa
9		Kingunge Ngombale–Mwiru	Industry and Trade	1998	1999	Benjamin Mkapa
10		Iddi Simba	Industry and Trade	2001	2002	Benjamin Mkapa
11		Juma Ngasongwa	Industry and Trade	2002	2005	Benjamin Mkapa
12		Nazir Karamagi	Industry, Trade and Marketing	2006	2007	Jakaya Kikwete
(4)		Basil Mramba	Industry, Trade and Marketing	2007	2008	Jakaya Kikwete
13		Mary Nagu	Industry, Trade and Marketing	2008	2010	Jakaya Kikwete
14		Cyril Chami	Industry and Trade	2010	2012	Jakaya Kikwete
(8)		Abdallah Kigoda	Industry and Trade	2012	12 October 2015	Jakaya Kikwete
15		Charles Mwijage	Industry, Trade and Investment	14 December 2015	10 November 2018	John Magufuli
16		Joseph Kakunda	Industry, Trade and Investment (— Jan 2019); Industry and Trade (Jan 2019 —)	10 November 2018	8 June 2019	John Magufuli
17		Innocent Bashungwa	Industry and Trade	8 June 2019	16 June 2020	John Magufuli
18		Geoffrey Mwambe	Industry and Trade	5 December 2020	31 March 2021	John Magufuli
19		Kitila Mkumbo	Industry and Trade	31 March 2021	8 January 2022	Samia Suluhu
20		Ashatu Kijaji	Industry, Trade and Investment	10 January 2022	Incumbent	Samia Suluhu
