= Minister of Home Affairs (Tanzania) =

- Waziri wa Mambo ya Ndani (Swahili)

- Incumbent; Hamad Masauni since 10 January 2022
- Ministry of Home Affairs
- Style: Honourable Minister
- Member of: Cabinet
- Seat: Dar es Salaam, Tanzania
- Appointer: President
- Term length: At the President's discretion
- Website: www.moha.go.tz

The Minister of Home Affairs is the head of the Ministry of Home Affairs of the Government of Tanzania.

== List of ministers ==
The following have served the ministry:

Parties

TANU CCM

#	Portrait	Minister	Took office	Left office	President
–		George Kahama	1961	1962	(Republic of Tanganyika)
–		Oscar Kambona	1962	1963	(Republic of Tanganyika)
1		Lawi Sijaona	1963	1965	Julius Nyerere
2		Job Lusinde	1966	1967	Julius Nyerere
3		Saidi Ali Maswanya	1967	1973	Julius Nyerere
4		Omary Muhaji	1973	1974	Julius Nyerere
5		Ali Hassan Mwinyi	1975	1976	Julius Nyerere
6		Hassan Moyo	1977	1978	Julius Nyerere
7		Salmin Juma	1979	1980	Julius Nyerere
8		Abdalla Natepe	1980	1983	Julius Nyerere
9		Muhidin Kimario	1983	1989	Julius Nyerere
		Muhidin Kimario	1983	1989	Ali Hassan Mwinyi
10		Nalaila Kiula	1990		Ali Hassan Mwinyi
11		Augustino Mrema	1990	1994	Ali Hassan Mwinyi
12		Ernest Nyanda	1995		Ali Hassan Mwinyi
13		Ali Ameir Mohamed	1995	1999	Benjamin Mkapa
14		Muhammed Seif Khatib	2000	2002	Benjamin Mkapa
15		Omar Mapuri	2003	21 December 2005	Benjamin Mkapa
16		John Chiligati	6 January 2006	16 October 2006	Jakaya Kikwete
17		Joseph Mungai	16 October 2006	13 February 2008	Jakaya Kikwete
18		Lawrence Masha	13 February 2008	28 November 2010	Jakaya Kikwete
19		Shamsi Nahodha	28 November 2010	7 May 2012	Jakaya Kikwete
20		Emmanuel Nchimbi	7 May 2012	20 December 2013	Jakaya Kikwete
21		Mathias Chikawe	20 January 2014	5 November 2015	Jakaya Kikwete
22		Charles Kitwanga	14 December 2015	2016	John Magufuli
23		Mwigulu Nchemba	2016	1 July 2018	John Magufuli
24		Alphaxard Kangi Ndege Lugola	1 July 2018	23 January 2020	John Magufuli
25		George Simbachawene	23 January 2020	9 January 2022	John Magufuli
25		George Simbachawene	23 January 2020	9 January 2022	Samia Suluhu
26		Hamad Masauni	10 January 2022	incumbent	Samia Suluhu
