= Amos Makalla =

Tanzanian politician

Honourable Amos Makalla MP

Deputy Minister of Water and Irrigation
- Incumbent
- Assumed office 20 January 2014
- Minister: Jumanne Maghembe
- Preceded by: Binilith Mahenge
- Succeeded by: Jumaa Hamidu Aweso

Deputy Minister for Information, Youth, Culture and Sports
- In office 7 May 2012 – 20 January 2014
- Minister: Fenella Mukangara
- Succeeded by: Juma Nkamia

Member of Parliament for Mvomero
- In office November 2010 – November 2015
- Preceded by: Suleiman Saddiq
- Succeeded by: Tegweta Mbumba

Personal details
- Born: 16 September 1971 (age 55)
- Party: CCM
- Education: IFM
- Profession: Certified Public Accountant

Amos Gabriel Makalla (born 16 September 1971) is a Tanzanian CCM politician and has been a Member of Parliament for Mvomero constituency from 2010 to 2015. As of 2013, he was the Deputy Minister of Information, Youth, Culture, and Sports.

Makalla received his Masters of Business Administration degree from Mzumbe University.

As of 2018, Makalla was Regional Commissioner for Mbeya.
