= Attorney General of Tanzania =

Member of the Tanzanian cabinet

- Mwanasheria Mkuu wa Serikali (Swahili)
- Incumbent; Eliezer Feleshi since 13 September 2021
- Attorney General's Chambers
- Abbreviation: AG
- Member of: Cabinet, Parliament
- Seat: Dar es Salaam, Tanzania
- Appointer: President
- Term length: At the President's discretion
- Constituting instrument: Article 59(3) of the Constitution
- Precursor: AG of Tanganyika
- Formation: 1964
- First holder: Roland Brown
- Deputy: Deputy Attorney General
- Website: www.agctz.go.tz

The Attorney General of Tanzania is the legal adviser to the Government of Tanzania and serves concurrently as an ex officio member of the Cabinet and Parliament.

== History ==
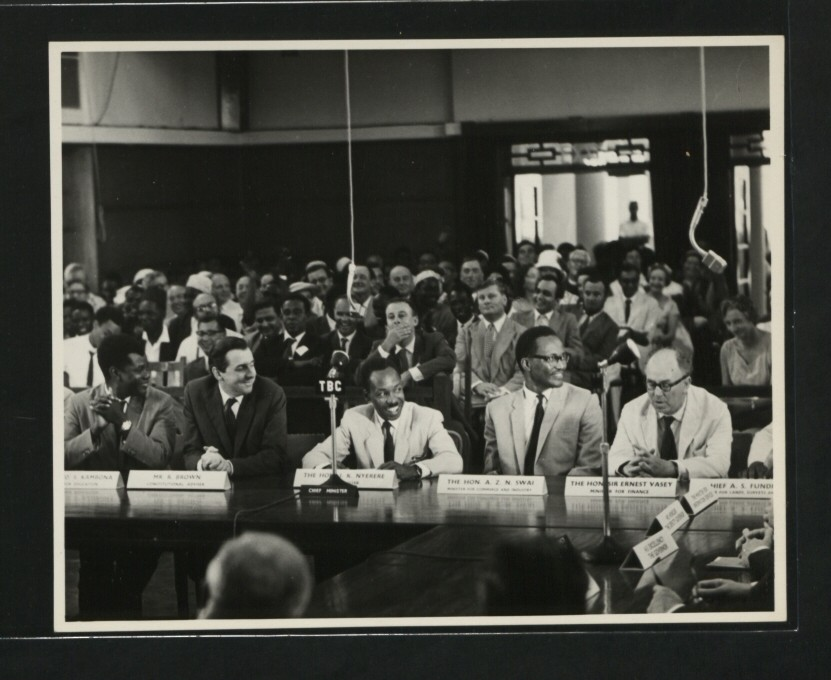
Nyerere and Brown at the 1961 Tanganyika Constitutional Conference

English barrister Roland Brown succeeded J. S. R. Cole to serve as the first Attorney General of independent Tanganyika from 1961 to 1964; and as the first Attorney General of Tanzania following the merger of Tanganyika with the People's Republic of Zanzibar.

Joseph Warioba concurrently served as Minister for Justice between 1983 and 1985; as did his successor Damian Lubuva during his tenure.

== List of attorneys general ==
#	Attorney General	Tenure
1	Roland Brown	1964–1965
2	Mark Bomani	1965–1976
3	Joseph Warioba	1976–1985
4	Damian Lubuva	1985–1993
5	Andrew Chenge	1993–2005
6	Johnson Mwanyika	2005–2009
7	Frederick Werema	2009–2014
8	George Masaju	2014 - 2018
9	Adelardus Kilangi	1 February 2018 - 12 September 2021
10	Eliezer Feleshi	13 September 2021 – August 2024
11	Hamza Johari	14 August 2024 - Present

== Controversies ==
Andrew Chenge was criticised for his advice to the government which led to the approval of the purchase of an overpriced $40 million radar from BAE Systems. His lawyers admitted that he had given legal advice on some aspects of the deal but did not promote it. In April 2008, Chenge resigned as Infrastructure Minister following the discovery of more than $1 million in an offshore account under his control in Jersey. Chenge described the amount as "small change" (vijisenti in Swahili) and denied receiving it as kickback from BAE Systems. The United Kingdom's Serious Fraud Office requested mutual legal assistance from Tanzania and requested that he be interviewed as a suspect in a criminal investigation. However, investigations by Tanzania's Prevention and Combating of Corruption Bureau and the UK's Serious Fraud Office (SFO) concluded that Chenge was not related to the radar scam.

In 2008, Johnson Mwanyika was accused of being one of the architects of the Richmond Scandal; a $172 million emergency power generating contract that was given to a U.S. based company that turned out to be a shell corporation and failed to deliver the 100 MW to the national grid. This led to the resignation of Prime Minister Edward Lowassa and the dissolution of the cabinet. A Parliamentary Select Committee proposed that he be sacked with immediate effect for his failure to advise the government. In July 2009, a government report exonerated him and this was criticised by some Members of Parliament. His retirement in October 2009 coincided with the deliberations of the report.

On 16 December 2014, Frederick Werema resigned after he was accused of authorizing the fraudulent transfer of about $120 million from a controversial escrow account. Werema stated that his advice had been misunderstood.
