= Mexico–Tanzania relations =

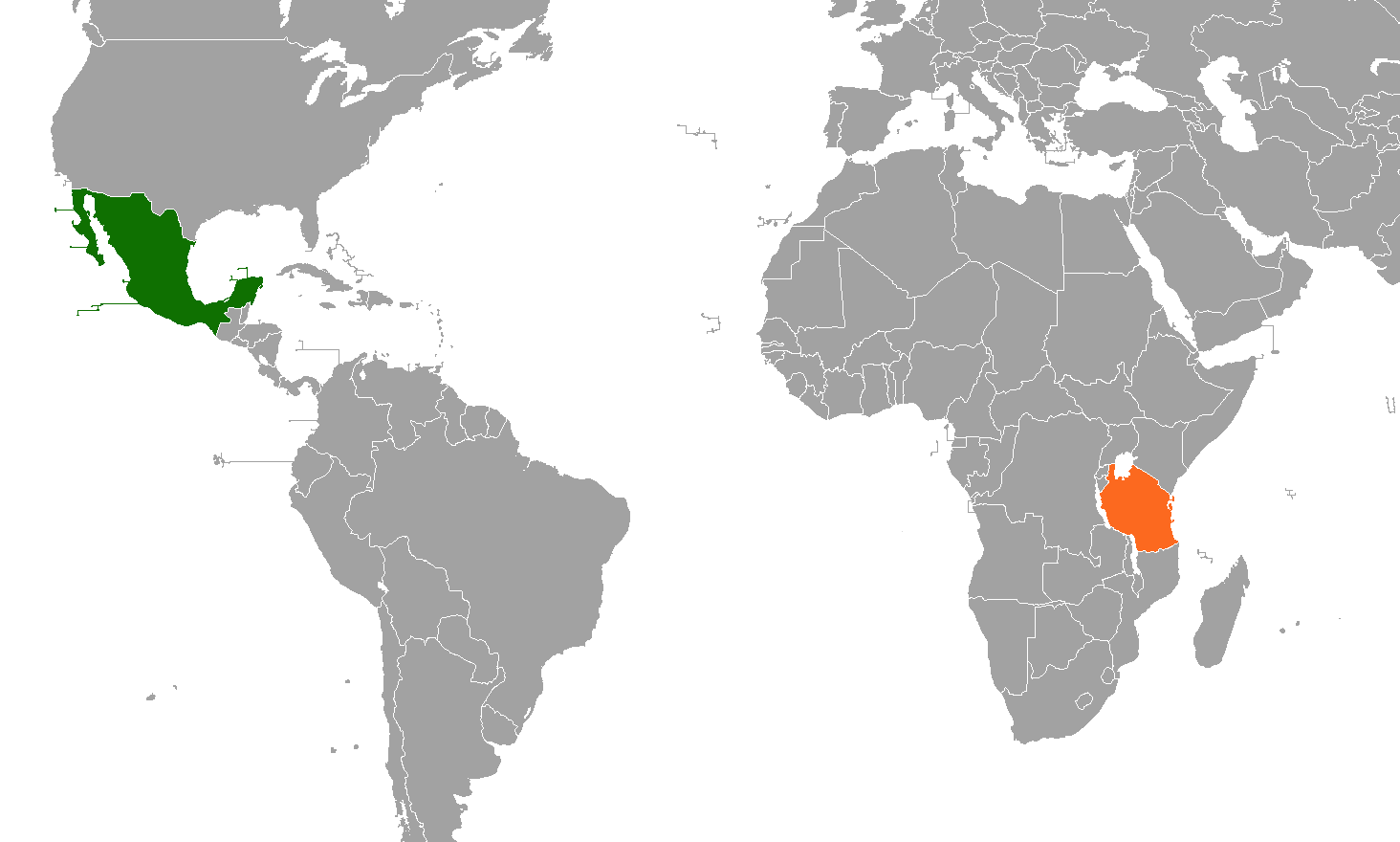

- Mexico: Tanzania

The nations of Mexico and Tanzania established diplomatic relations in 1973. Both nations are members of the United Nations.

== History ==
Mexico and Tanzania established diplomatic relations on 19 February 1973. That same year, Mexico opened an embassy in the Tanzanian capital of Dar es Salaam.

In 1974, Mexican Foreign Secretary Emilio Óscar Rabasa paid a visit to Tanzania. In April 1975, Tanzanian President Julius Nyerere paid a six-day official visit to Mexico. During his visit, President Nyerere met with President Luis Echeverría and they discussed the issues facing Africa at the time. Furthermore, President Nyerere asked Mexico to take an active role in assisting Tanzania with building their new capital at Dodoma by allowing architects, planners and students to come from Tanzania and study at Mexican universities and for Mexican technicians to travel to Tanzania to work in developing projects for the new capital.

In July 1975, Mexican President Luis Echeverría paid a four-day state visit to Tanzania. While in Tanzania, President Echeverría visited Serengeti National Park and the new capital of Dodoma. Both nations signed an agreement to increase scholarships for up to 30 students to study in each nation and for Mexico to increase financial assistance to Tanzanian henequen farmers.

In 1980, Mexico closed its embassy in Tanzania due to financial restraints. In 1981, President Nyerere returned to Mexico to attend the North–South Summit in Cancún. He would return again to Mexico in 1986.

In December 2006, Tanzanian Prime Minister Edward Lowassa and Vice-President Mohamed Gharib Bilal attended the inauguration ceremony for Mexican President Felipe Calderón. In 2008, Tanzanian Vice-President Ali Mohamed Shein and Minister of Health, David Mwakyusa, paid a visit to Mexico to attend the International AIDS Conference.

In 2009, Mexico became the first Latin American nation to be invited to attend and show at the Zanzibar International Film Festival. In April 2013, Mexican Foreign Undersecretary, Lourdes Aranda Bezaury, paid a visit to Tanzania to promote the candidacy to the World Health Organization for Dr. Herminio Blanco Mendoza.

In 2023, both nations celebrated 50 years of diplomatic relations.

== High-level visits ==
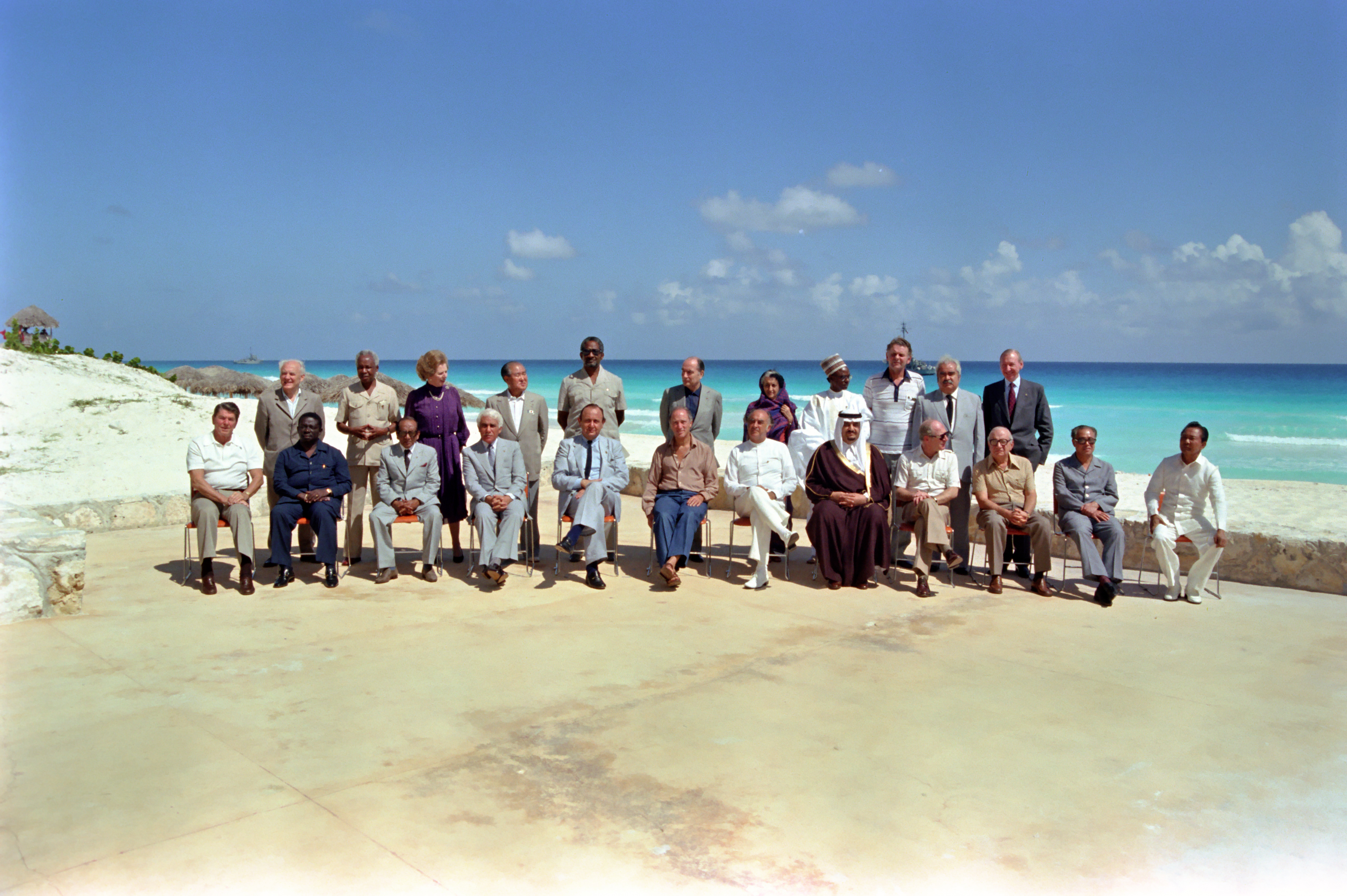
Tanzanian President Julius Nyerere attending the North–South Summit in Cancún along with his Mexican counterpart, President José López Portillo; 1981.

High-level visits from Mexico to Tanzania

- Foreign Secretary Emilio Óscar Rabasa (1974)
- President Luis Echeverría (1975)
- Foreign Undersecretary Lourdes Aranda Bezaury (2013)

High-level visits from Tanzania to Mexico

- President Julius Nyerere (1975, 1981, 1986)
- Prime Minister Edward Lowassa (2006)
- Vice President Mohamed Gharib Bilal (2006, 2012)
- Vice President Ali Mohamed Shein (2008)
- Minister of Health David Mwakyusa (2008)

== Bilateral agreements ==
Both nations have signed bilateral agreements such as an Agreement in Agricultural Cooperation (1975); Trade Agreement (1975); Agreement in Health Cooperation (2007); and a Memorandum of Understanding for the Establishment of a Mechanism of Consultation in Matters of Mutual Interest (2008).

== Trade ==
In 2023, trade between Mexico and Tanzania totaled US$15.9 million. Mexico's main export to Tanzania include: articles of iron or steel, medicines, disc, tapes and other media sound recordings; machinery, telephones and mobile phones, malt extract, and tractors. Tanzania's main exports to Mexico include: seeds, fruits and spores for sewing; clothing articles, electronic integrated circuits, parts and apparatus for protecting electrical circuits, electrical wires and cables, vegetable oils, hides, and precious stones.

== Diplomatic missions ==
- Mexico is accredited to Tanzania from its embassy in Nairobi, Kenya and maintains an honorary consulate in Dar es Salaam.
- Tanzania is accredited to Mexico from its embassy in Washington, D.C., United States.
