= Ministry of Labor and Employment =

Ministry of Labor and Employment or Ministry of Labour and Employment may refer to:

- Ministry of Labour and Employment (Bangladesh)
- Ministry of Labor and Employment (Brazil)
- Ministry of Labour and Employment (India)
- Department of Labor and Employment (Philippines)
- Ministry of Labour and Employment (Tanzania)
