= Abdallah Kigoda =

Tanzanian politician

Dr Abdallah Kigoda
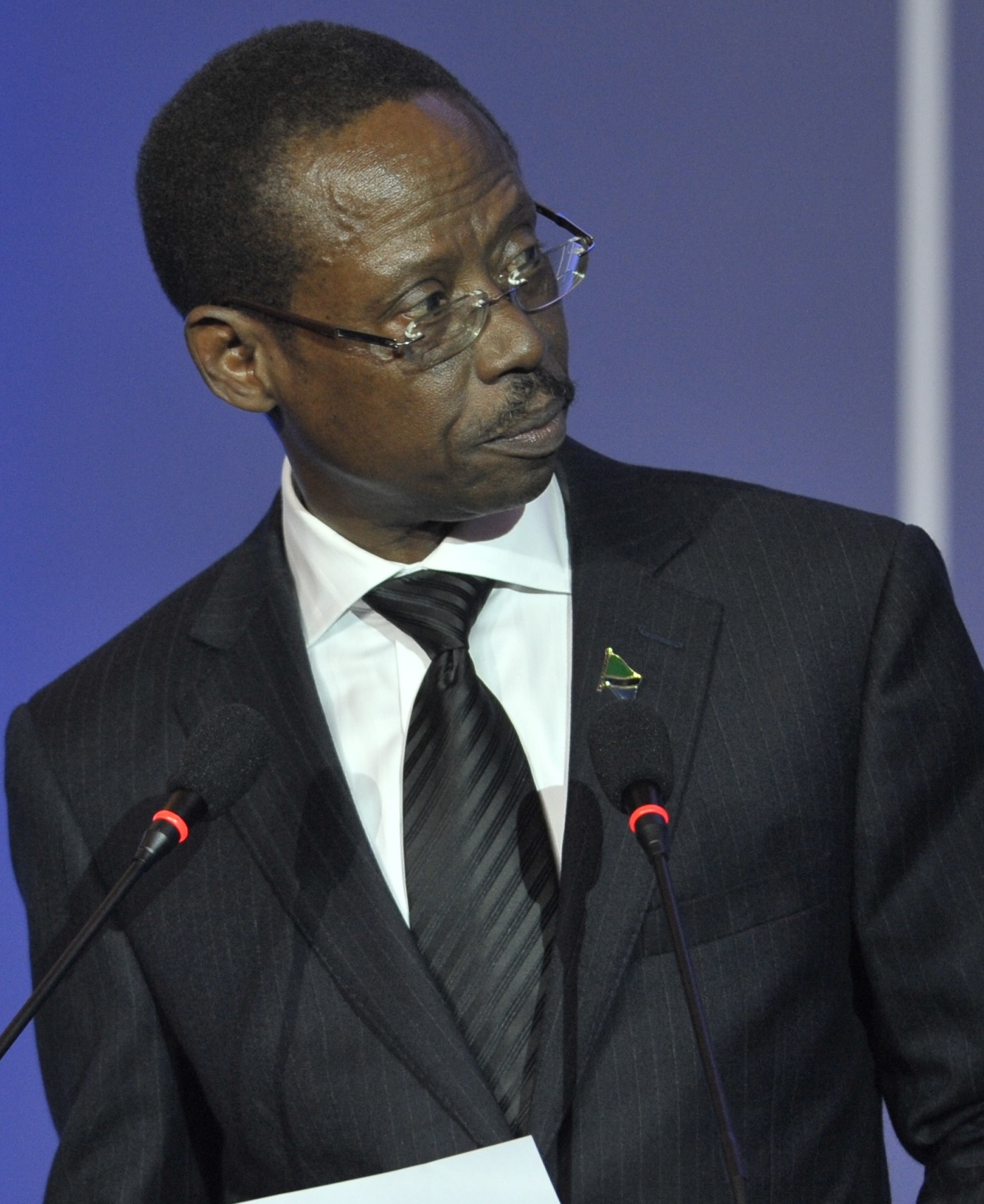

8th Minister of Industry and Trade
- In office 7 May 2012 – 12 October 2015
- President: Jakaya Kikwete
- Preceded by: Cyril Chami
- In office 1996–1997
- Preceded by: William Shija
- Succeeded by: Kingunge Ngombale–Mwiru

Minister of State in the President's Office for Planning and Privatization
- In office 2000–2005
- President: Benjamin Mkapa

Minister of Energy and Minerals
- In office 1997–2000
- President: Benjamin Mkapa

Member of Parliament for Handeni
- In office October 1995 – July 2015

Personal details
- Born: 25 November 1953 Tanganyika
- Died: 12 October 2015 (aged 61) New Delhi, India
- Resting place: Handeni, Tanzania
- Party: CCM
- Education: University of Dar es Salaam; Vanderbilt University (MA); University of Missouri (PhD)
- Profession: Economist

Abdallah Omar Kigoda (25 November 1953 – 12 October 2015) was a Tanzanian CCM politician and Member of Parliament for Handeni constituency from 1995 to 2015. He served as Minister of Industry and Trade from 1996 to 1997 and from 2012 to 2015, as Minister of Energy and Minerals from 1997 to 2000, and as Minister of State in the President's Office for Planning and Privatisation from 2000 to 2005.

He overwhelmingly won the Chama Cha Mapinduzi (CCM) nomination for Handeni constituency prior to the 2005 parliamentary election, receiving 1,216 votes while the nearest of his four opponents for the nomination received 94.

He died on 12 October 2015 whilst undergoing treatment in India.
