= Juma Nkamia =

Tanzanian politician

Honourable Juma Nkamia MP

Deputy Minister of Information, Youth, Culture and Sports
- Incumbent
- Assumed office 20 January 2014
- Minister: Fenella Mukangara
- Preceded by: Amos Makalla

Member of Parliament for Chemba
- Incumbent
- Assumed office November 2015
- Preceded by: Paschal Degera

Personal details
- Born: 1 January 1972 (age 54)
- Party: CCM
- Education: SJMC (Dip)

Juma Selemani Nkamia (born 1 January 1972) is a Tanzanian CCM politician and Member of Parliament for Chemba constituency since 2015. He served as deputy minister of Information, Youth, Culture and Sports in the cabinet of Tanzania.
