= Celina Kombani =

Tanzanian politician (1959–2015)

Minister of State in the President's Office for Public Service Management
- In office 7 May 2012 – 24 August 2015
- President: Jakaya Kikwete

Minister of Justice and Constitutional Affairs
- In office 28 November 2010 – 9 May 2012
- President: Jakaya Kikwete

State Minister in the PM's Office for Regional Admin. and Local Govt.
- In office 13 February 2008 – 28 November 2010
- Prime Minister: Mizengo Pinda

Deputy State Minister in the PM's Office for Regional Admin. and Local Govt.
- In office 6 January 2006 – 13 February 2008
- Prime Minister: Edward Lowassa

Member of Parliament for Ulanga East
- In office December 2005 – July 2015

Personal details
- Born: 19 June 1959 Ulanga District, Morogoro Region,Tanganyika Territory
- Died: 24 September 2015 (aged 56) India
- Party: CCM
- Education: Mzumbe University (BA), (MA)

Celina Ompeshi Kombani (19 June 1959 – 24 September 2015) was a Tanzanian CCM politician and Member of Parliament for the Ulanga East constituency from 2005 to 2015. She also served as Minister of State in the President's Office for Public Service Management.

Kombani died on 24 September 2015 whilst undergoing treatment in India. She was 56.
