= Minister of State for Union Affairs =

- Waziri wa Nchi (Muungano) (Swahili)

- Incumbent; Samia Suluhu since 28 November 2010
- State Ministry for Union Affairs
- Style: Honourable Minister
- Member of: Cabinet
- Seat: Dar es Salaam, Tanzania
- Appointer: President
- Term length: At the President's discretion
- Website: www.vpo.go.tz

The Minister of State for Union Affairs is the head of the State Ministry in the Vice President's Office for Union Affairs of the Government of Tanzania.

== List of ministers ==
The following have served the ministry:

Party

CCM

#	Portrait	Minister	Portfolio	Took office	Left office	President
		Arcado Ntagazwa	Union Affairs and Environment	2000	2005	Benjamin Mkapa
1		Hussein Mwinyi	Union Affairs	2006	2008	Jakaya Kikwete
2		Muhammed Seif Khatib	Union Affairs	2008	2010	Jakaya Kikwete
3		Samia Suluhu	Union Affairs	2010	Incumbent	Jakaya Kikwete
