= Andrew Chenge =

Tanzanian politician

Honourable Andrew Chenge MP

Minister of Infrastructure Development
- In office 2006–2008
- President: Jakaya Kikwete
- Succeeded by: Shukuru Kawambwa

1st Minister of East African Cooperation
- In office 6 January 2006 – 16 October 2006
- President: Jakaya Kikwete
- Succeeded by: Ibrahim Msabaha

Member of Parliament for Bariadi West
- In office December 2005 – June 2020
- Preceded by: Isaac Cheyo
- Succeeded by: Kundo Mathew

5th Attorney General of Tanzania
- In office 1993–2005
- Appointed by: Ali Hassan Mwinyi 1993–95); Benjamin Mkapa (1995–05)
- Preceded by: Damian Lubuva
- Succeeded by: Johnson Mwanyika

Personal details
- Born: 24 December 1947 (age 78) Tanganyika
- Party: CCM
- Education: University of Dar es Salaam; Harvard University (LL.M)

Andrew John Chenge (born 24 December 1947) is a Tanzanian CCM politician. He is currently the longest serving Attorney General of the United Republic of Tanzania, a former Minister of Infrastructure, and a former Member of Parliament for Bariadi West constituency from 2005 to 2020.

== Background ==
After serving as Attorney-General, he was appointed as Minister of East African Affairs in the Cabinet named on January 4, 2006. He was then appointed as Minister of Infrastructure on October 15, 2006, retaining that post in the Cabinet named on February 12, 2008. He resigned on 20 April 2008 after it was revealed by UK's Serious Fraud Office that he holds US$1million (over 1 billion Tanzania shillings) in an overseas offshore account, allegedly as kickbacks from a controversial military radar deal between UK's BAE Systems and Tanzania government which he partly oversaw while serving as Attorney-General. However, an investigation by Tanzania's Prevention and Combating of Corruption Bureau concluded that Chenge was not related to the radar scam.

In 2009, Andrew Chenge was involved in an accident in Dar es Salaam in which two women died. He was later convicted of dangerous driving and fined 700,000 Tsh.

He was reelected in November 2015 as a parliamentary representative for the Bariadi West Constituency. He has also been appointed as the presiding Chairman of Parliament as of January 2015.
