= Charles Kitwanga =

Tanzanian politician

Honourable Charles Kitwanga MP
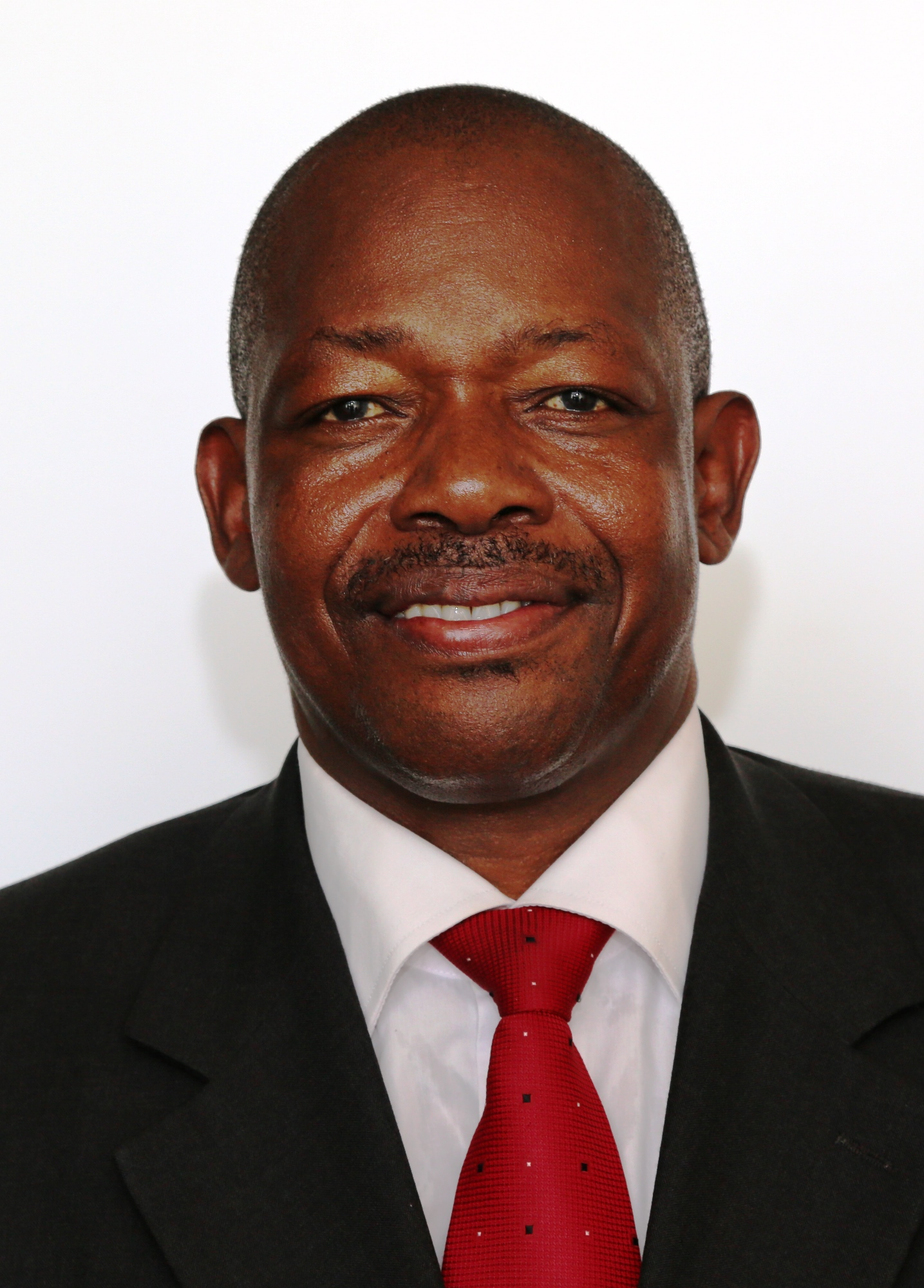
- In office 12 December 2015 – 20 May 2016
- President: John Magufuli
- Preceded by: Mathias Chikawe
- In office 20 January 2014 – 5 November 2015
- Preceded by: George Simbachawene

Deputy Minister of State in the Vice President's Office for Environment
- In office 7 May 2012 – 20 January 2014
- Minister: Terezya Huvisa
- Succeeded by: Ummy Mwalimu

Deputy Minister of Communication, Science and Technology
- In office 28 November 2010 – 7 May 2012
- Minister: Makame Mbarawa
- Succeeded by: January Makamba

Member of Parliament for Misungwi
- Incumbent
- Assumed office November 2010
- Preceded by: Jacob Shibiliti

Personal details
- Born: 27 September 1960 (age 66) Mwanza Region, Tanganyika
- Party: CCM
- Education: University of Dar Es Salaam; University of Essex (MSc)
- Nickname: Mawe Matatu (Three Stones)

Charles Muhangwa Kitwanga (born 27 September 1960) is a Tanzanian CCM politician and Member of Parliament for Misungwi constituency since 2010. He served as a minister of internal and home affairs in the Magufuli cabinet for five months beginning in December 2015. Kitwanga was found drunk during a parliamentary session on 20 May 2016 and was immediately suspended for drinking during working hours.
