= Abdulla Saadalla =

Tanzanian politician

Honourable Abdulla Saadalla MP
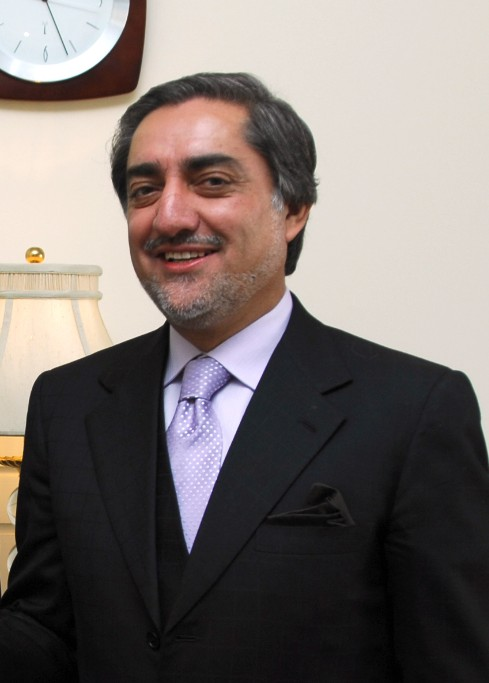
- Abdulla Saadalla, 2009

Deputy Minister of East African Cooperation
- Incumbent
- Assumed office 28 November 2010
- Minister: Samuel Sitta

Member of Parliament for Rahaleo
- Incumbent
- Assumed office November 2010
- Preceded by: Saleh Ali Farrah

Personal details
- Party: CCM

Abdulla Juma Abdulla Saadalla is a Tanzanian CCM politician and Member of Parliament for Rahaleo constituency since 2010. He is the Deputy Minister of East African Cooperation.
