= Minister of Water and Irrigation =

- Waziri wa Maji na Umwagiliaji

- Incumbent; Jumaa Aweso since 5 December 2020
- Ministry of Water and Irrigation
- Style: Honourable Minister
- Member of: Cabinet
- Seat: Dar es Salaam, Tanzania
- Appointer: President
- Term length: At the President's discretion
- Website: www.maji.go.tz

The Minister of Water and Irrigation is the head of the Ministry of Water and Irrigation of the Government of Tanzania.

== History ==
The water portfolio has over the years been part of a number of other ministries.

== List of ministers ==
The following have served the ministry:

Parties

TANU CCM

#	Portrait	Minister	Portfolio	Took office	Left office	President
–		Dereck Bryeson	Agriculture	1961	1964	(Tanganyika)
		Tewa S. Tewa	Lands, Housing and Water Development	1964	1966	Julius Nyerere
		Said Maswanya	Lands, Housing and Water Development	1966	1968	Julius Nyerere
		Abdulrahman Babu	Lands, Housing and Water Development	1968	1970	Julius Nyerere
		Wilbard Chagula	Water and Power	1971	1974	Julius Nyerere
		I. Elinewinga	Water and Power	1974	1975	Julius Nyerere
		Wilbard Chagula	Water, Electricity and Minerals	1976	1978	Julius Nyerere
		I. Elinewinga	Water, Energy and Minerals	1978	1982	Julius Nyerere
		Al Noor Kassum	Water and Energy	1982	1983	Julius Nyerere
–						Julius Nyerere
		Al Noor Kassum	Water, Energy and Minerals	1985	1986	Ali Hassan Mwinyi
		Pius Ng'wandu	Lands, Water, Housing and Urban Development	1985	1987	Ali Hassan Mwinyi
1		Pius Ng'wandu	Water	1987	1990	Ali Hassan Mwinyi
2		Christian Kisanji	Water	1990		Ali Hassan Mwinyi
		Jakaya Kikwete	Water, Energy and Minerals	1990	1994	Ali Hassan Mwinyi
		Jackson Makweta	Water, Energy and Minerals	1994	1995	Ali Hassan Mwinyi
(1)		Pius Ng'wandu	Water	1996	1999	Benjamin Mkapa
3		Mussa Nkhangaa	Water	1999	2001	Benjamin Mkapa
		Edward Lowassa	Water and Livestock	2001	2005	Benjamin Mkapa
4		Stephen Wasira	Water	2006		Jakaya Kikwete
5		Shukuru Kawambwa	Water	2006	2008	Jakaya Kikwete
6		Mark Mwandosya	Water and Irrigation Development	2008	2010	Jakaya Kikwete
6		Mark Mwandosya	Water	2010	2012	Jakaya Kikwete
7		Jumanne Maghembe	Water and Irrigation	2012	5 November 2015	Jakaya Kikwete
8		Makame Mbarawa	Minister of Water and Irrigation	14 December 2015	23 December 2015	John Magufuli
9		Gerson Lwenge	Minister of Water and Irrigation	23 December 2015	7 October 2017	John Magufuli
10		Isack Aloyce Kamwelwe	Minister of Water and Irrigation	7 October 2017	1 July 2018	John Magufuli
11		Makame Mbarawa	Minister of Water and Irrigation	1 July 2018	16 June 2020	John Magufuli
12		Jumaa Aweso	Minister of Water and Irrigation	5 December 2020	Incumbent	John Magufuli
