= Binilith Mahenge =

Tanzanian politician

Dr Binilith Mahenge

4th Minister of State for Environment
- In office 30 January 2014 – 5 November 2015
- Vice President: Mohamed Gharib Bilal
- Preceded by: Terezya Huvisa

Deputy Minister of Water and Irrigation
- In office 7 May 2012 – 20 January 2014
- Minister: Jumanne Maghembe
- Succeeded by: Amos Makalla

Member of Parliament for Makete
- In office December 2005 – July 2015
- President: Dr. Jakaya Mrisho Kikwete
- Succeeded by: Adamson Norman

Personal details
- Born: 1 April 1962 (age 64) Tanganyika
- Party: CCM
- Education: Belarusian State Polytechnic Academy (MSc), (PhD)
- Profession: Engineer
- Positions: Senior lecturer, DIT (2003-2005)

Binilith Satano Mahenge (born 1 April 1962) is a Tanzanian CCM politician and former Member of Parliament for Makete constituency from 2005 to 2015. He also served as the Minister of State in the Vice President's Office for Environment from 2014 to 2015 when his tenure as the Member of Parliament ended.
