= George Simbachawene =

Tanzanian politician

Honourable George Boniface Simbachawene MP

Minister of Constitutional Affairs and Justice
- In office 10 January 2022 – 1 April 2022
- President: Samia Suluhu
- Preceded by: Palamagamba Kabudi
- Succeeded by: Damas Ndumbaro

25th Minister of Home Affairs
- In office 23 January 2020 – 8 January 2022
- President: John Pombe Magufuli (2020); Samia Suluhu (2021)
- Preceded by: Alphaxard Lugola
- Succeeded by: Hamad Masauni

Minister of State in the Vice President's Office
- In office 22 July 2019 – 23 January 2020
- President: John Pombe Magufuli
- Succeeded by: Mussa Zungu

Minister of State in the President’s Office
- In office 12 December 2015 – 7 September 2017 Serving with Angellah Kairuki
- President: John Pombe Magufuli
- Succeeded by: George Mkuchika

Minister of Energy and Minerals
- In office 24 January 2015 – 5 November 2015
- Preceded by: Sospeter Muhongo
- Succeeded by: Sospeter Muhongo

Member of Parliament for Kibakwe
- Incumbent
- Assumed office December 2005
- Preceded by: Daimon Mwaga

Personal details
- Born: 5 July 1970 (age 56)
- Party: CCM
- Education: Arusha Technical College; Open University of Tanzania (LL.B)

George Boniface Taguluvala Simbachawene (born 5 July 1968) is a Tanzanian CCM politician and Member of Parliament for Kibakwe constituency since 2005.

He held the post of the Minister of State in the President’s Office responsible for Regional Administration, Local Government, Civil Service and Good Governance from November 2015 to September 2017. He resigned from his post on September 7, 2017 after his name was implicated in the Minerals report from his time in the Ministry of Energy and Minerals.

On 21 July 2019, he is assigned as the Minister of State in the Vice President's Office. On January 23, 2020 he was appointed as the Minister of Home Affairs. On 10 January 2022 he was sworn in as the new Minister for Legal and Constitutional Affairs.
