= Mark Mwandosya =

Tanzanian politician

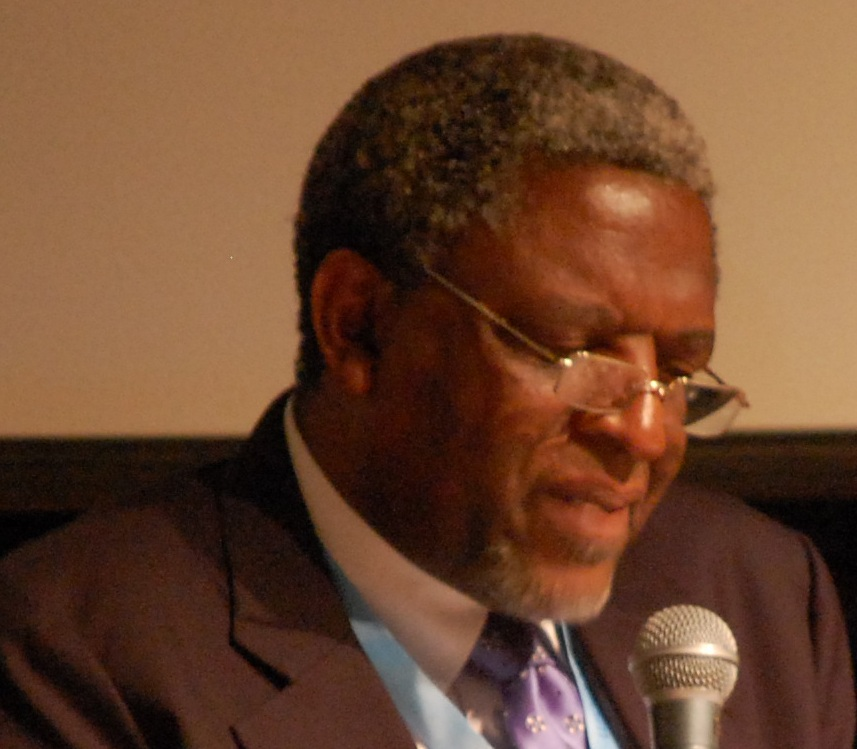

Minister without Portfolio
- In office 7 May 2012 – 5 November 2015
- President: Jakaya Kikwete

6th Minister of Water
- In office 28 November 2010 – 7 May 2012
- Succeeded by: Jumanne Maghembe

Minister of Water and Irrigation
- In office 13 February 2008 – 28 November 2010
- President: Jakaya Kikwete

1st Minister of State for Environment
- In office 6 January 2006 – 13 February 2008
- Succeeded by: Batilda Burian

Member of Parliament for Rungwe East
- In office November 2000 – July 2015
- Succeeded by: Atupele Mwakibete

Personal details
- Born: 28 December 1949 (age 76) Tanganyika
- Party: CCM
- Education: Aston University (BSc); University of Birmingham (PhD)

Mark James Mwandosya (born 28 December 1949) is a Tanzanian CCM retired politician and a former Member of Parliament for Rungwe East constituency, who is the chairman of Ewura Tanzania and the chairs of the Energy Regulators Association of East Africa Annual General Assembly.

== Background ==
Mwandosya was a youth leader of the Tanganyika African National Union (TANU) from 1967 to 1968 and became a member of TANU in 1971, remaining a member when TANU became the Chama Cha Mapinduzi (CCM) in 1977. He taught at the University of Dar es Salaam from 1977 to 1987, as a lecturer from 1977 to 1980, as a senior lecturer from 1980 to 1983, and as an associate professor from 1983 to 1987.

He was Commissioner at the Ministry of Water, Energy and Minerals from 1985 to 1990, Principal Secretary at the Ministry of Water, Energy and Minerals from 1990 to 1992, and Principal Secretary at the Ministry of Industries and Trade from 1992 to 1993. From 1994 to 2000, he again taught at the University of Dar es Salaam, this time as a professor.

He has been a member of the National Assembly of Tanzania for the CCM since 2000, and he was Minister of Communication and Transport from 2000 to 2005. He was then appointed as Minister of State in the Vice-President's Office responsible for the Environment on January 4, 2006. He was moved to the position of Minister of Water and Irrigation on February 12, 2008.

He was Professor in Electrical Engineering holding an endowed Professorial Research Chair in Energy Technology and Management at the University of Dar-es-Salaam, Tanzania. He has over 20 years of professional and lecturing experience in Tanzania, Norway and U.S.A. He has devoted much of his time in research and studies in energy and natural resource development and use. He has been a consultant in a number of projects both in Tanzania and in Africa. Prof. Mwandosya was a Team Leader of a group which drafted the Southern African Development Community (SADC) Energy Protocol. Prof. Mwandosya also drafted, for the Organisation of African Unity, and the African Economic Community the Protocol on Energy and Natural Resources.

He has been Chairman of the Board of Directors of the Tanzania Petroleum Development Corporation (TPDC), Chairman of the Tanzanian and Italian Petroleum Refining Company Ltd. (TIPER), Chairman of the National Urban Water Authority, Chairman of Williamson Diamonds Ltd., Chairman of SIEMENS (Tanzania) Ltd., Chairman of the Board of Directors of the Tanzania Industrial Research and Development Organisation (TIRDO), Chairman of Council of College of Business Education and Chairman of the Board of Directors of Kibo Paper Industries Ltd. Prof. Mwandosya has also been Vice-Chairman of the Board of Trustees of the Southern African Development through Electricity (SADELEC). He has been Vice-Chairman of the National Development Corporation (NDC). He has been a Director in numerous Boards such as the UNESCO National Commission, Tanzania Posts and Telecommunications Corporation (TPTC), Tanzania Electric Supply Company Ltd., (TANESCO), AGIP (T) Ltd., Tanzania Petroleum Development Corporation (TPDC), the Tanzania National Scientific Research Council and the Tanzania Commission for Science and Technology, the Tanzania Zambia Pipelines Ltd (TAZAMA), and the Tanzania Zambia Railway Authority (TAZARA), Commissioner (Non-executive) of the Tanzania Communication Commission (TCC), and Member of Council of Sokoine University of Agriculture and Institute of Development Management Mzumbe. Professor Mwandosya has also been involved in state sector reforms including privatisation on and in the crafting of Tanzanians long-term development vision (Vision 2025).

Prof. Mwandosya has written a number of books and numerous publications in the fields of engineering systems, energy, water, environment, and regulation of utilities. Since 1993 Prof. Mwandosya has participated actively in and was head of the Climate Change Studies Programme in Tanzania. He has attended meetings of Subsidiary Bodies and Conferences of Parties (CoP) of the United Nations Framework Convention on Climate Change since 1995. In 1997 Prof. Mwandosya was the Chairman of the Group of 77 and spokesman for the Group of 77 and China at the meetings of the subsidiary bodies for the Climate Convention and during the negotiations for the Kyoto Protocol. In 2007 special stamp was issued by the Tanzania Postal Services to recognise his contribution to the protection of the environment. He is currently a member of the Steering Committee of the United Nations Environment Program (UNEP) International Resource Panel. Prof. Mwandosya is a distinguished member of the Advisory Board of NatureNews, Africa's foremost independent newspaper that is focused on Environment, Climate Change and Sustainable Earth. In 2021, he gave the maiden anniversary lecture of NatureNews titled "Climate Change: Mitigation and Resilience."
