= Hadji Mponda =

Tanzanian politician (born 1958)

Honourable Dr Hadji Mponda MP
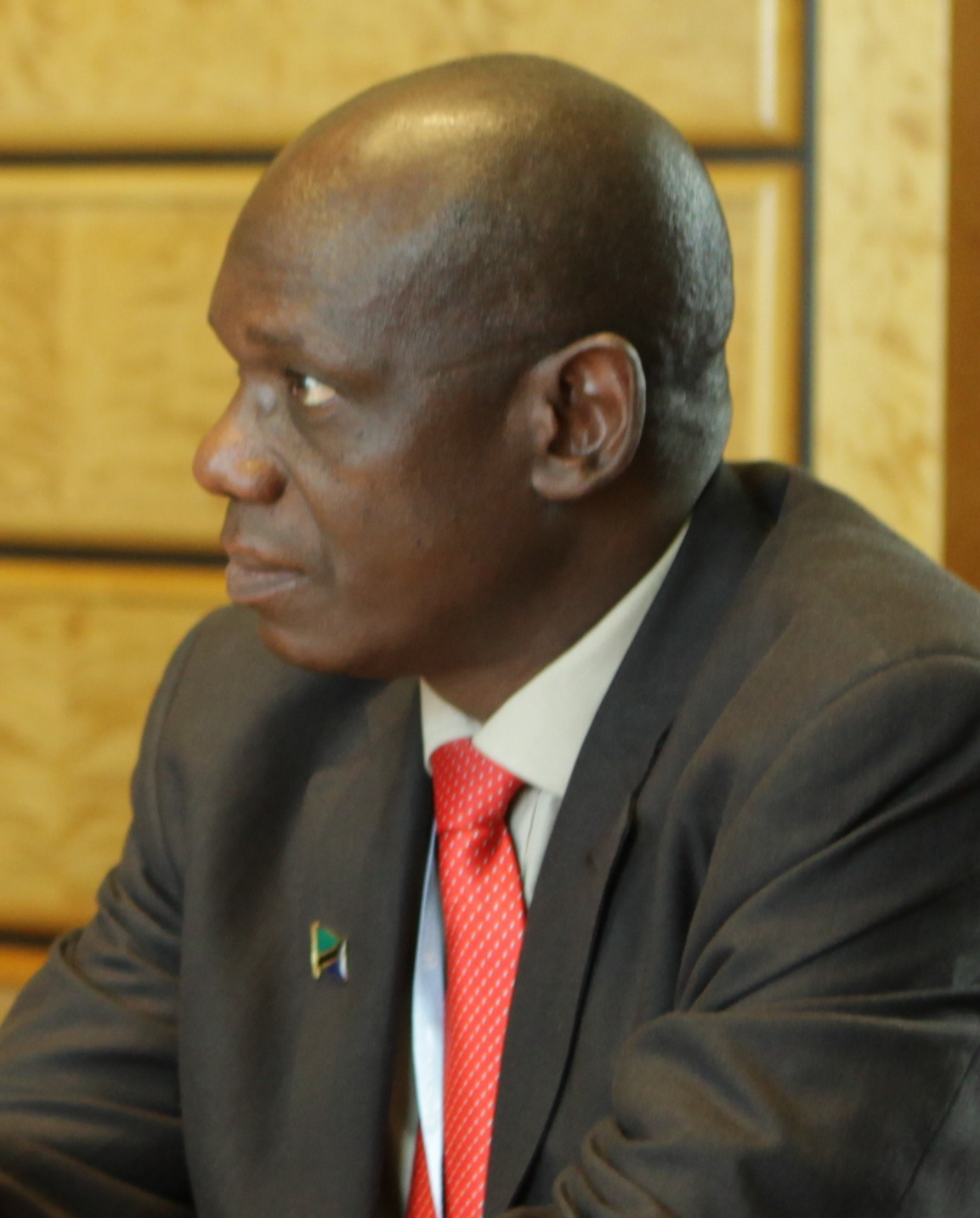

Member of Parliament for Ulanga West
- Incumbent
- Assumed office November 2010
- Preceded by: Juma Ngasongwa

Personal details
- Born: 27 September 1958 (age 68) Tanganyika
- Party: CCM
- Education: Mzumbe University; London School of Hygiene & Tropical Medicine (PhD)

Hadji Hussein Mponda (born 27 September 1958) is a Tanzanian CCM politician and Member of Parliament for Ulanga West constituency since 2010.
