= George Mkuchika =

Tanzanian politician

Hon. Ret. Captain George Mkuchika MP
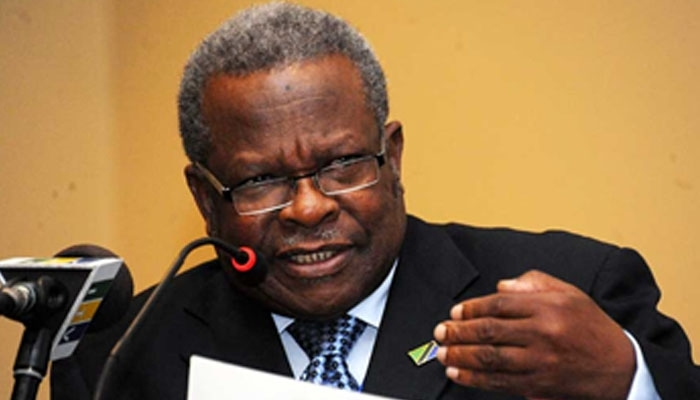

Minister of State in the President's Office for special work
- Incumbent
- Assumed office 7 October 2017
- President: John Pombe Magufuli
- Preceded by: George Simbachawene

Minister in the PM's Office for Regional Admin. and Local Govt.
- In office 28 November 2010 – 7 May 2012
- Prime Minister: Mizengo Pinda
- Succeeded by: Hawa Ghasia

Minister of Information, Culture and Sports
- In office 13 February 2008 – 28 November 2010
- President: Jakaya Kikwete

Member of Parliament for Newala
- Incumbent
- Assumed office December 2005

Tanga Regional Commissioner
- In office 1995–2005
- President: Benjamin Mkapa

Personal details
- Born: 6 October 1948 (age 77) Tanganyika
- Party: CCM
- Education: University of Dar es Salaam

Military service
- Allegiance: United Rep. of Tanzania
- Branch/service: Tanzanian Army
- Rank: Captain
- Battles/wars: Uganda–Tanzania War
- Awards: Nishani ya Vita

George Huruma Mkuchika (born 6 October 1948) is a Tanzanian CCM politician and Member of Parliament for Newala constituency. He is the current Minister of State in the President's Office (special work).
