= Samuel Sitta =

Tanzanian politician from Tabora Region

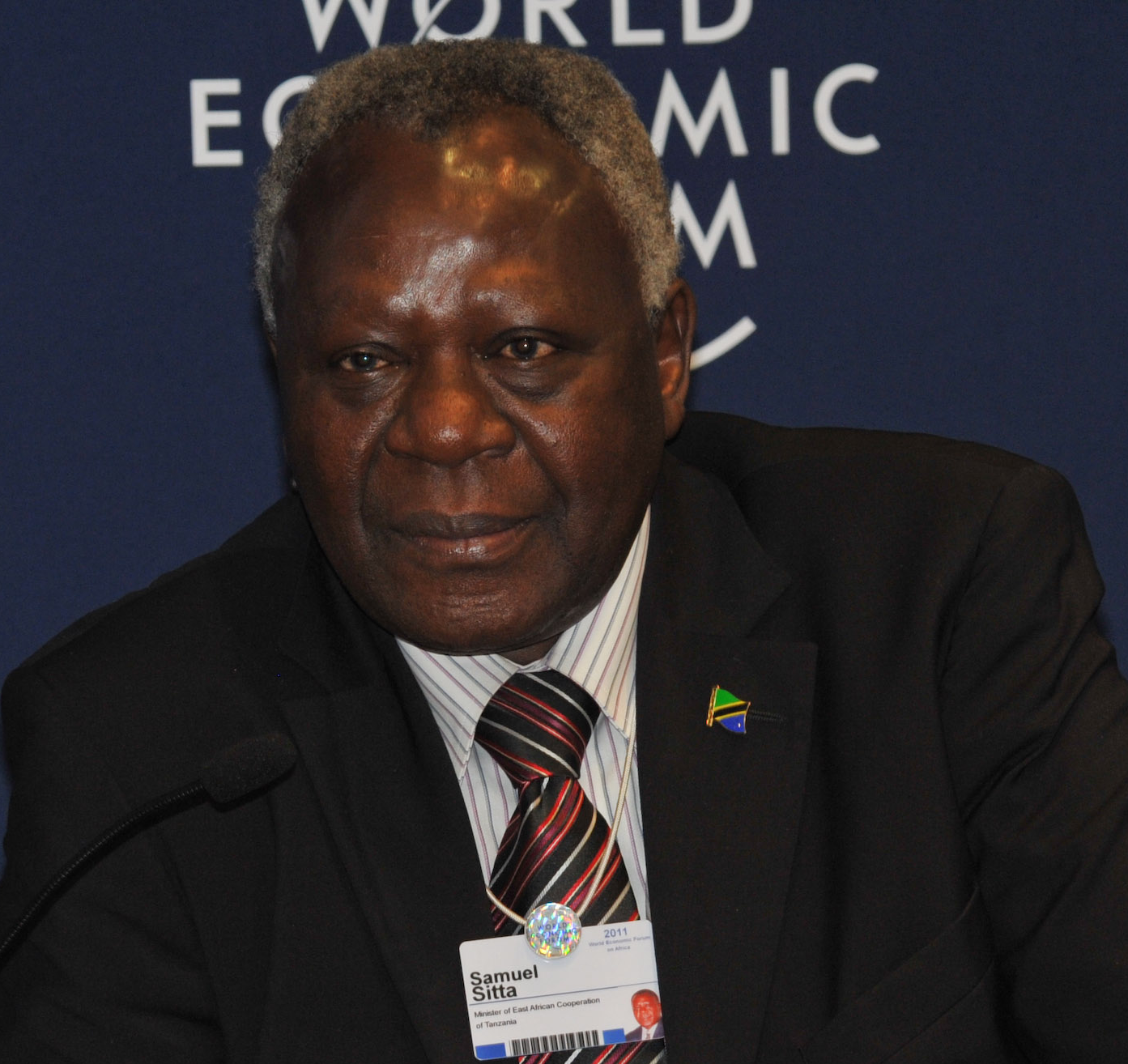

Minister of Transport
- In office 24 January 2015 – 5 November 2015
- President: Jakaya Kikwete
- Preceded by: Harrison Mwakyembe

4th Minister of East African Cooperation
- In office 28 November 2010 – 24 January 2015
- Preceded by: Diodorus Kamala
- Succeeded by: Harrison Mwakyembe

5th Speaker of the National Assembly
- In office 28 December 2005 – 16 July 2010
- Preceded by: Pius Msekwa
- Succeeded by: Anne Makinda

Member of Parliament for Urambo East
- In office December 2005 – July 2015
- Preceded by: Ally Amani Karavina
- Succeeded by: Margaret Simwanza Sitta

Personal details
- Born: 18 December 1942 Urambo District, Tanganyika
- Died: 7 November 2016 (aged 73) Munich, Germany
- Resting place: Urambo District, Tanzania
- Party: CCM
- Spouse: Margaret Simwanza Sitta
- Education: University of Dar es Salaam; IMEDE (AdvDip)
- Positions: MD, Tanzania Investment Centre (1996-2005)

Samuel John Sitta (18 December 1942 – 7 November 2016) was a Tanzanian CCM politician and Member of Parliament for Urambo East of Tabora Region. He was the Speaker of the National Assembly of Tanzania from December 2005 to 2010 and Minister of East African Cooperation from 2010 to 2015.

== Life and career ==
Sitta, a member of the majority Chama Cha Mapinduzi party, served as a member of parliament from 1975 to 1995 and was director-general of the Tanzania Investment Centre. Later he served again as an MP, representing Urambo Mashariki.

He was elected to succeed Pius Msekwa as Speaker of the National Assembly on 26 December 2005. He was appointed to the Cabinet as Minister of East African Cooperation in 2010.

Samuel Sitta died at around 3am on 7 November 2016 at TUM School of Medicine (Klinikum rechts der Isar) in Munich (Germany) after falling ill for a short period.
