= Frederick Werema =

Tanzanian jurist (1955–2024)

Hon. Justice Frederick Werema

7th Attorney General of Tanzania
- In office 20 October 2009 – 16 December 2014
- Preceded by: Johnson Mwanyika
- Succeeded by: George Masaju

Member of the Tanzanian Parliament
- In office 20 October 2009 – 16 December 2014
- Succeeded by: George Masaju
- Constituency: Ex officio member

Justice of the High Court of Tanzania
- In office 2007–2009
- Appointed by: Jakaya Kikwete

Advocate/Director at Tanzania Attorney General's Chambers
- In office 1984–2006

Personal details
- Born: 10 October 1955
- Died: 30 December 2024 (aged 69)
- Education: UDSM (LL.B); American University (LL.M)

Frederick Mwita Werema (10 October 1955 – 30 December 2024) was the Attorney General of Tanzania from 2009 until his resignation in 2014. Before his appointment Werema was High Court of Tanzania Judge in the Commercial Division.

== Early life and career ==
Werema was born on 10 October 1955. He acquired his lLaw degrees from the University of Dar es Salaam, American University Graduate School in the United States, Italy on Contracts, the United Kingdom and Bolivia where he learned how to privatise electricity companies.

He had previously worked in the Attorney General's Office from 1984 to 2007. In 2005 he was appointed an alternate member of SADC Tribunal before that in 1999, as Director of Constitutional Affairs and Human Rights.

=== Attorney General ===
Werema was sworn in on 20 October 2009 at the State House.

He resigned in December 2014 after he was accused of authorizing the transfer of about $120 million from a controversial escrow account. Werema stated that his advice had been misunderstood.

== Death ==
Werema died on 30 December 2024, at the age of 69.
