= Juma Akukweti =

Tanzanian politician (1947–2007)

Minister of State in the PM's Office for Parliamentary Affairs
- In office January 2006 – January 2007
- President: Jakaya Kikwete

Personal details
- Born: 20 September 1947 Tanganyika
- Died: 4 January 2007 (aged 59)
- Party: CCM
- Education: UDSM (BSc)

Juma Jamaldin Akukweti (20 September 1947 – 4 January 2007) was a Member of Parliament in the National Assembly of Tanzania. He represented Tunduru District in parliament from 1990 until his death, as a member of CCM. On 28 December 2005, he also became the Minister of State for Parliamentary Affairs in the Prime Minister's Office.

Akukweti completed Form IV at Songea Secondary School in 1969 where he was a schoolmate of Godfrey Mwakikagile who finished his studies in Form IV in 1968. Akukweti went on for further studies at Tabora High School where he completed his A-level education in 1971. He graduated from the University of Dar es Salaam in 1975 with a BSc. (Honors) in Education. In 1978 he received a diploma in Social Management from ESAMI in Arusha.

Akukweti was a tutor at the National Transport Institute of Tanzania from 1975 through 1977, after which he served as the institute's dean of students until 1981. He then worked as an administrative manager at the Tanzania Fisheries Research Institute until 1989, and co-ordinator and administrative manager at the Morogoro Oil Processing Company (MOPROCO) from 1989 until his election to parliament in 1990.

On 16 December 2006, he was seriously injured when the small plane he was flying in crashed on take-off in the city of Mbeya. He died on 4 January 2007, at Milpark Hospital in Johannesburg, South Africa, due to injuries sustained in the plane crash and subsequent infections of his wounds.
