= Kibakwe =

Administrative ward in Tanzania

Coordinates: 6°43′S 36°22′E

Kibakwe is an administrative ward in the Mpwapwa district of the Dodoma Region of Tanzania. According to the 2002 census, the ward has a total population of 18,521.

The water supply of Kibakwe is currently (2014) being improved by a German Evangelical community.
