= Stephen Wasira =

Tanzanian politician

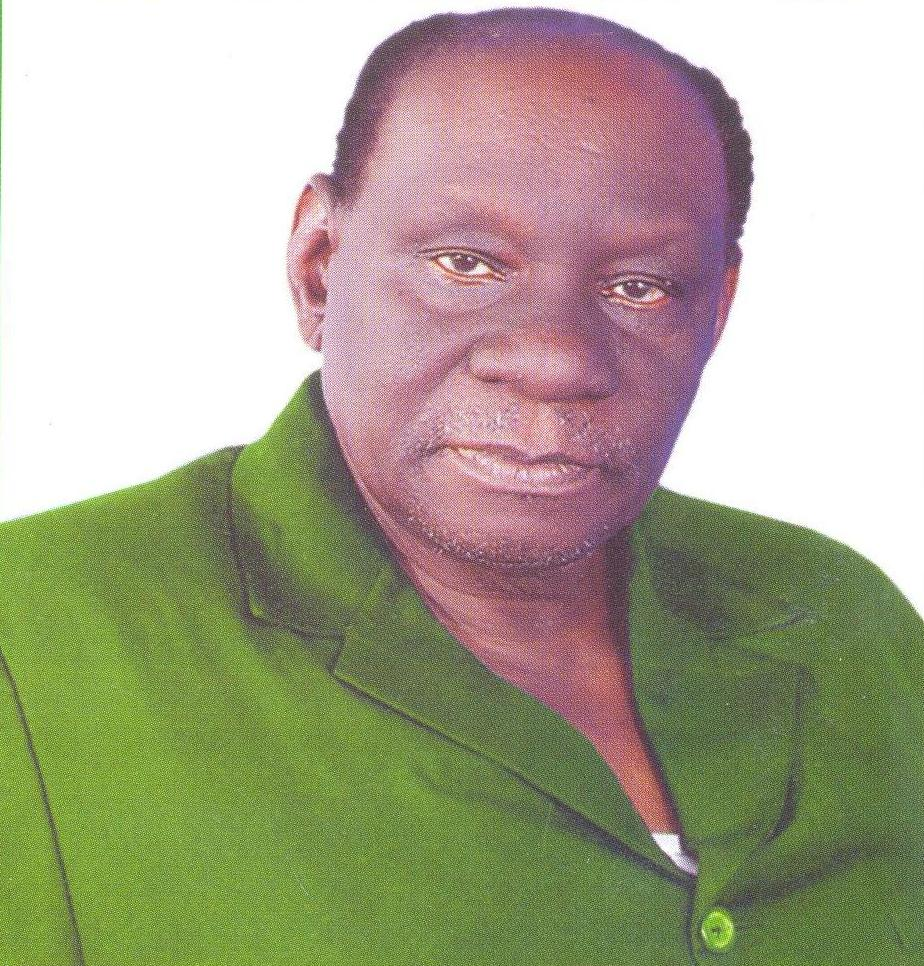

Vice Chairman, Chama Cha Mapinduzi
- Incumbent
- Assumed office 18 January 2025
- President: Samia Suluhu Hassan
- Preceded by: Abdulrahman Kinana

State Minister in the PM's Office for Local Govt. and Regional Admin.
- In office 13 February 2008 – 28 November 2010
- Prime Minister: Mizengo Pinda

4th Minister of Water
- In office 6 January 2006 – 13 February 2008
- President: Jakaya Kikwete

Member of Parliament Bunda
- In office December 2005 – July 2015
- Preceded by: Tembe Nyaburi
- Succeeded by: Ester Bulaya

Personal details
- Born: Stephen Masato Wasira; 1945 (age 80–81) Bunda, Tanganyika
- Party: CCM
- Education: American University
- Website: www.stephenwasira.co.tz

Stephen Masato Wasira (born 1 July 1945 in Korosero (Misisi) village, Sazira ward, Bunda District, Mara Region) is a Tanzanian CCM politician who began his political career in the Tanganyika African National Union (TANU) Youth League at age 13. Throughout his career, he has held positions as Regional Commissioner, Minister in various portfolios, and served multiple terms as Member of Parliament for Bunda constituency between the 1980s and 2015, including a continuous 2-five-year term from 2005 to 2015. In President Jakaya Kikwete's second term, he served as the Minister of State in the President's Office for Social Relations and Coordination since 2010. He was selected as the Vice Chairman (Tanzania-Mainland) in Chama cha Mapinduzi, succeeding Abdulrahman Kinana.

== Background ==
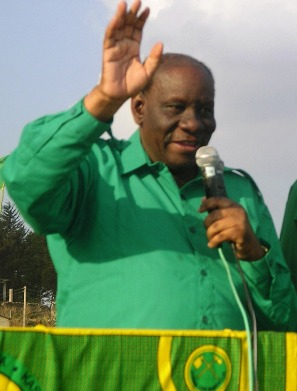
Wasira addressing a political gathering

Wasira served as Deputy Minister of Agriculture in the first phase Government under President Julius Nyerere and also served as the Deputy Minister for Local Government and later as the Minister of Agriculture and Livestock Development under the second phase President Ali Hassan Mwinyi.

He was appointed as Minister of Water on January 4, 2006, when Jakaya Kikwete, who had been elected president, named his new cabinet. He was then moved to the position of Minister for Agriculture, Food Security and Cooperatives on October 15, 2006, and on February 12, 2008, he was named as the Minister in the Prime Minister's Office for Regional Administration and Local Government.

On November 24, 2010, Wasira was named Minister of State in the President's Office for Social Relations and Coordination in the newly formed cabinet after the October 2010 elections.

Within the ruling Chama cha Mapinduzi, most recently he was a member of the 370-member National Executive Committee (NEC), the highest policy and decision-making body of the ruling party. He served in this position since 2007. In November 2012, he was overwhelmingly re-elected by the party's National Congress to serve another five-year term. Also, in 2011, he was elected a member of the party's powerful 28-member Central Committee (CC) He continued serving as a member of the Central Committee after being re-elected in February 2013 up to December 2017. and later returned for another term from 2022 to 2023. His leadership role in the party expanded when he was selected the Vice Chairman in January 2025, succeeding Abdulrahman Kinana

== Education ==
- BA in Economics & International Studies, American University in Washington, DC, USA.
- MA in economics (Applied Economics), American University in Washington, DC, USA.
- Masters in Public Administration, American University in Washington, DC, USA.
