= Sophia Simba =

Tanzanian politician

Honourable Sophia Simba MP

Minister of Community Development, Gender and Children
- In office 28 November 2010 – 5 November 2015
- President: Jakaya Kikwete
- In office 6 January 2006 – 13 February 2008
- President: Jakaya Kikwete

Minister of State in the President's Office for Good Governance
- In office 13 February 2008 – 28 November 2010
- President: Jakaya Kikwete

Member of Parliament
- Incumbent
- Assumed office December 2005
- Constituency: None (Special Seat)

Personal details
- Born: 27 July 1950 (age 76) Tanganyika
- Party: CCM
- Education: UDSM (LL.B); University of Zimbabwe (PG); University of New Hampshire (MSc)

Sophia Mattayo Simba (born 27 July 1950) is a Tanzanian CCM politician and a special seat Member of Parliament since 2010. She was the Minister of Community Development, Gender and Children.
