= Shukuru Kawambwa =

Tanzanian politician

Honourable Dr Shukuru Kawambwa MP
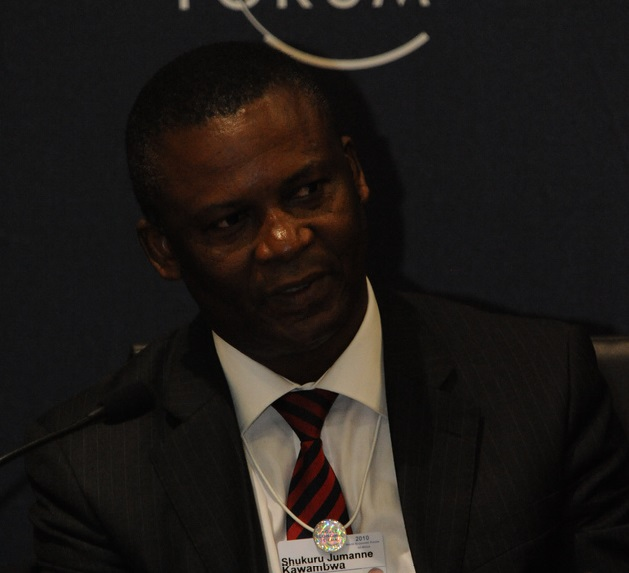

Former Minister of Education and Vocational Training
- In office 28 November 2010 – 5 November 2015
- President: Jakaya Kikwete
- Succeeded by: Joyce Ndalichako

Minister of Infrastructure Development
- In office 12 May 2008 – 28 November 2010
- Preceded by: Basil Mramba
- Succeeded by: John Magufuli

Minister of Science, Technology and ICT Development
- In office 13 February 2008 – 11 May 2008
- President: Jakaya Kikwete

5th Minister of Water
- In office 17 October 2006 – 8 February 2008
- President: Jakaya Kikwete

Minister of Livestock Development
- In office 1 January 2006 – 16 October 2006
- President: Jakaya Kikwete

Member of Parliament for Bagamoyo
- In office December 2005 – November 2020
- Preceded by: Ramadhani Khalfan

Personal details
- Born: 15 December 1957 (age 68) Tanganyika
- Party: CCM
- Education: University of Dar es Salaam; University of Reading (MSc); University of Surrey (PhD)

Shukuru Jumanne Kawambwa is a Tanzanian CCM politician and Member of Parliament for Bagamoyo constituency from 2005 to 2020. He is the former Minister of Education and Vocational Training. He has also served as the Minister of Infrastructure Development
