= Johnson Mwanyika =

Tanzanian politician

6th Attorney General of Tanzania
- In office December 24, 2005 – October 2009
- Preceded by: Andrew Chenge
- Succeeded by: Frederick Werema

Johnson Paulo Mathias Mwanyika is a former Attorney General of Tanzania, having previously held the offices of Deputy Attorney General and Permanent Secretary in the Ministry of Justice and Constitutional Affairs. He was appointed in December 2005, succeeding Andrew Chenge, who left the post after ten years to become an MP.

In September 2008, Mwanyika was implicated in the Richmond electricity generation scandal. A government statement absolving Mwanyika was released in July 2009, but was rejected by MPs.

Mwanyika retired in October 2009, and was succeeded by Judge Frederick Werema.
