= Mathias Chikawe =

Tanzanian politician

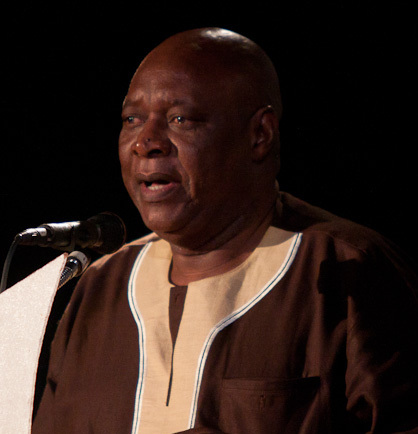

21st Minister of Home Affairs
- In office 20 January 2014 – 5 November 2015
- President: Jakaya Kikwete
- Preceded by: Emmanuel Nchimbi
- Succeeded by: Charles Kitwanga

Minister of Justice and Constitutional Affairs
- In office 7 May 2012 – 20 January 2014
- President: Jakaya Kikwete
- Succeeded by: Asha-Rose Migiro
- In office 13 February 2008 – 28 November 2010
- President: Jakaya Kikwete

Minister of State in the President's Office for Good Governance
- In office 28 November 2010 – 7 May 2012
- President: Jakaya Kikwete

Member of Parliament for Nachingwea
- In office December 2005 – July 2015
- Preceded by: Edger Maokola–Majogo

Personal details
- Born: 30 May 1951 (age 75) Tanganyika
- Party: CCM (1977–present); TANU (1972–1977)
- Education: University of Dar es Salaam; North Staffordshire Polytech. ISS (PGDip)

Mathias Meinrad Chikawe (born 30 May 1951) is a Tanzanian CCM politician and diplomat.

He was Member of Parliament for Nachingwea constituency from 2005 to 2015. He was the ambassador of the United Republic of Tanzania to Japan.
