= Minister of East African Cooperation =

Tanzanian minister

- Waziri wa Ushirikiano wa Afrika Mashariki (Swahili)

- Ministry of East African Cooperation
- Style: Honourable Minister
- Member of: Cabinet; EAC Council of Ministers; East African Legislative Assembly
- Seat: Dar es Salaam, Tanzania
- Appointer: President
- Term length: At the President's discretion
- Abolished: 2015
- Website: www.meac.go.tz

The Minister of East African Cooperation is the head of the Ministry of East African Cooperation of the Government of Tanzania.

== List of ministers ==
The following have served the ministry:

Party

CCM

#	Portrait	Minister	Took office	Left office	President
1		Andrew Chenge	6 January 2006	16 October 2006	Jakaya Kikwete
2		Ibrahim Msabaha	16 October 2006	7 February 2008	Jakaya Kikwete
3		Diodorus Kamala	7 February 2008	28 November 2010	Jakaya Kikwete
4		Samuel Sitta	28 November 2010	24 January 2015	Jakaya Kikwete
5		Harrison Mwakyembe	24 January 2015	5 November 2015	Jakaya Kikwete
