= Gaudentia Kabaka =

Tanzanian politician

Minister of Labour and Employment
- In office 28 November 2010 – 5 November 2015
- President: Jakaya Kikwete

Deputy Minister of Education and Vocational Training
- In office 13 February 2008 – 28 November 2010
- President: Jakaya Kikwete

Deputy Minister of Science, Technology and Higher Education
- In office 5 January 2006 – 13 February 2008
- President: Jakaya Kikwete

Member of Parliament
- In office December 2005 – July 2015
- Constituency: None (Special Seat)

Personal details
- Born: 15 April 1949 (age 77) Tarime District, Mara Region, Tanganyika Territory
- Party: CCM
- Education: Klerruu TTC (Dip); University of Dar es Salaam
- Profession: Teacher

Gaudentia Mugosi Kabaka (born 15 April 1949) is a Tanzanian CCM politician and a special seat at Member of Parliament since 2005. She is the current Minister of Labour and Employment.
