= Ministry of East African Cooperation =

Government ministry of Tanzania

- Wizara ya Ushirikiano wa Afrika Mashariki (Swahili)

Ministry overview
- Superseding Ministry: Ministry of Foreign Affairs and East African Cooperation
- Jurisdiction: Tanzania
- Headquarters: NSSF Water Front Building, Dar es Salaam; 6°49′30″S 39°17′2.5″E
- Minister responsible: Samuel Sitta
- Deputy Minister responsible: Abdulla J. Abdulla
- Ministry executive: Joyce Mapunjo, Permanent Secretary
- Website: meac.go.tz

The Ministry of East African Cooperation (MEAC) was a government ministry responsible for coordinating Tanzania's political, economic, military, social, and cultural relations with the other countries of the East African Community.

The ministry was created in 2006 by Government Notice No. 1. Its offices are located in Dar es Salaam. The Minister for East African Cooperation is Samuel Sitta.

The Ministry was merged into the Ministry of Foreign Affairs and East African Cooperation under John Magufuli's cabinet.

== See also ==
- Minister of East African Cooperation
