= Hawa Ghasia =

Tanzanian politician

Honourable Hawa Ghasia MP

State Minister in the PM's Office for Regional Admin. and Local Govt.
- In office 7 May 2012 – 5 November 2015
- Prime Minister: Mizengo Pinda
- Preceded by: George Mkuchika

State Minister in the President's Office for Public Service and Management
- In office 4 January 2006 – 7 May 2012
- President: Jakaya Kikwete

Member of Parliament for Mtwara Rural
- Incumbent
- Assumed office December 2005
- Preceded by: Abdillahi Namkulala

Personal details
- Born: 10 January 1966 (age 60) Mtwara Region, Tanzania
- Party: CCM
- Education: Mzumbe University (AdvDip); Sokoine University (MA)

Hawa Abdulrahman Ghasia (born 10 January 1966) is a Tanzanian politician belonging to the ruling Chama Cha Mapinduzi (CCM) party and a three-term Member of Parliament for Mtwara Rural constituency since 2005. She is the former Minister of State in the Prime Minister's Office for Regional Administration and Local Government.

== Background ==
Ghasia was born on 10 January 1966. She completed her schooling at Ndanda Secondary School in 1989. She received an advanced diploma from the Institute of Development Management - Mzumbe in 1995. She received her master's degree from the Sokoine University of Agriculture in 2003. She had a long career as an economic planner working for the Mtwara town council and the Maasai district council between 1992 and 2005.

== Political career ==
Ghasia was nominated as the CCM candidate for Mtwara Rural District in the 2005 parliamentary election, receiving 529 votes and defeating four other candidates for the nomination, including Juma Chinavati with 372 votes and incumbent Abdillahi Namkulala with 135 votes.

Following the election, in 2006, she was appointed as Minister of State in the President's Office for Public Service and Management and served in this role until 2012. Between 2012 and 2015, she served as a Minister in the Prime Minister's Office for Regional Administration and Local Government.

In the 2015 parliamentary election, Ghasia was in a close race, defeating Suleiman Fadhili of CHADEMA by a vote margin of 24,258 to 22,615 votes. Her election was challenged in court with the petitioners alleging irregularities and fraud in voting and vote counting. The case was dismissed as the application was filed one day too late.

She did not receive a ministerial portfolio in the new President John Magufuli's administration. Instead, Ghasia is the chairperson of the Parliamentary Standing Committee on the Budget.
