= Juma Kapuya =

Tanzanian politician

Hon. Professor Juma Kapuya MP

Member of Parliament for Urambo West
- In office November 1995 – November 2015
- Succeeded by: Jacqueline Kainja

Personal details
- Born: 22 June 1945 (age 81) Tanganyika Territory
- Party: CCM
- Education: University of Dar es Salaam; Aberystwyth University (PhD)
- Profession: Botanist
- Position(s): Professor, UDSM (1987–95)

Juma Athumani Kapuya (born 22 June 1945) is a Tanzanian CCM politician and Member of Parliament for Urambo West constituency from 1995 to 2015.

== Career ==
Kapuya was a member of the National Executive Council of the governing Chama Cha Mapinduzi (CCM) from 1997 to 2005. After serving as Minister of Labour, Youth Development and Sports, Kapuya was appointed as Minister of Defence and National Service on January 4, 2006. After two years as Defence Minister, he was appointed as Minister of Labour, Employment and Youth Development on February 12, 2008.

He is a CCM Member of Parliament in the Tanzanian National Assembly, representing the Urambo West constituency. Prior to his government service, Kapuya was a professor of botany at the University of Dar es Salaam.
