= David Mwakyusa =

Tanzanian Member of Parliament

Hon. Professor David Mwakyusa MP
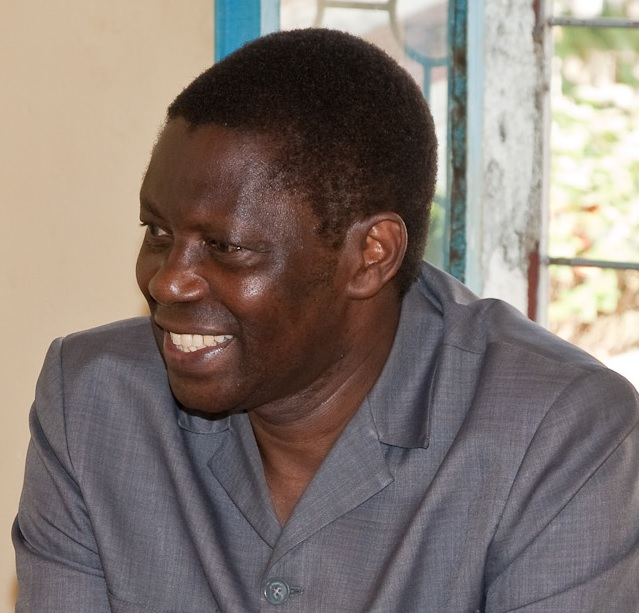

Member of Parliament for Rungwe West
- In office November 2000 – 2010

Personal details
- Born: 9 November 1942 (age 83) Tanganyika
- Party: CCM
- Spouse: Margreth Mahundi Mwakyusa
- Children: Dr Sekela Mwakyusa, David Mwakyusa Jr, Lulu Mwakyusa, Lela Mwakyusa, Gida Mwakyusa
- Education: Makerere University (MBChB); University of Dar es Salaam
- Profession: Medical doctor

David Homeli Mwakyusa (born 9 November 1942) is a Tanzanian CCM politician and Member of Parliament for Rungwe West constituency since 2000. He was Minister of Health from 2006 to 2010.
