= Nazir Karamagi =

Tanzanian politician

Minister of Energy and Minerals
- In office 15 October 2006 – 7 February 2008
- President: Jakaya Kikwete
- Preceded by: koracia tusuz

Minister of Industry, Trade and Marketing
- In office January 2006 – October 2006
- President: Jakaya Kikwete

Member of the Tanzanian Parliament
- In office 2003–2010
- Constituency: Bukoba town

Personal details
- Born: 13 December 1953 (age 72) Tanganyika
- Party: CCM
- Education: Saint Petersburg Mining Institute (MSc); University of Edinburgh (MBA); University of Strathclyde (MSc)

Nazir Mustafa Karamagi (born December 13, 1953) is a Tanzanian politician and a Member of Parliament in the National Assembly of Tanzania, representing Bukoba Vijijini constituency.

Karamagi has been a member of the National Executive Council of the Chama Cha Mapinduzi (CCM) since 2002. He was appointed Minister of Industry, Trade and Marketing in the Cabinet named on January 4, 2006. He was then moved to the position of Minister of Energy and Minerals on October 15, 2006, remaining in the latter post until he resigned on February 7, 2008, after being implicated in a scandal regarding a government contract to supply emergency power. His resignation came shortly after Prime Minister Edward Lowassa resigned for the same reason.

According to Karamagi, he took over the Ministry of Energy and Minerals six months after the government had signed the aforementioned contract, which Karamagi said was a deal made in good faith and intended to provide more energy for the country.
