= Mary Nagu =

Tanzanian politician (born 1952)

Honourable Mary Nagu MP
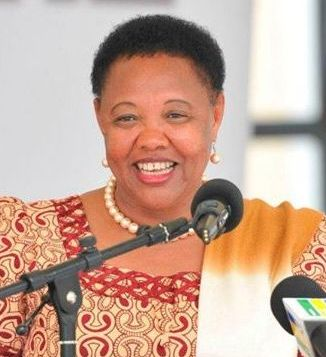

13th Member of parliament
- In office 13 February 2008 – 28 November 2010

Member of Parliament for Hanang
- Incumbent
- Assumed office December 2015
- Preceded by: Frederick Sumaye

Personal details
- Born: 11 May 1952 (age 74) Tanganyika
- Party: CCM
- Education: University of Dar es Salaam

Mary Michael Nagu (born 11 May 1952) is a Tanzanian CCM politician and Member of Parliament for Hanang constituency since 2005. She is the former Minister of State in the Prime Minister's Office for Investment and Empowerment.

Nagu served as Minister of Justice and Constitution Affairs from 2006 to 2008.
