= Juma Ngasongwa =

Tanzanian politician

Minister of Planning, Economy and Empowerment
- In office 2006–2008
- President: Jakaya Kikwete

Minister of Industry and Trade
- In office 2001–2005
- President: Benjamin Mkapa

Minister of Natural Resources and Tourism
- In office 1995–1996
- President: Benjamin Mkapa
- Succeeded by: Zakia Meghji

Member of the Tanzanian Parliament
- In office 1995–2010
- Succeeded by: Hadji Mponda
- Constituency: Ulanga West

Economic Advisor of the President
- In office 1993–1995
- President: Ali Hassan Mwinyi

Personal details
- Born: 13 August 1941 (age 85)
- Party: CCM
- Education: University of Suchdol (BSc); UDSM (MA); University of East Anglia (PhD)
- Positions: Senior lecturer, SUA (1984-93); Lecturer, UDSM (1976-84)

Military service
- Allegiance: United Rep. of Tanzania
- Branch/service: National Service
- Military camp: Ruvu and Mlale
- Duration: 2 years

Dr Juma Alifa Ngasongwa (born 13 August 1941 in Ngombo in Ulanga District) is a Tanzanian politician who served as Chama Cha Mapinduzi Member of Parliament for Ulanga Magharibi in the National Assembly of Tanzania.

Ngasongwa grew up in Biro in Malinyi a ward of Ulanga district in Tanzania, and graduated from the University of Suchdol, Prague, Czechoslovakia, in 1967 with a Bachelor of Science degree. He later earned a master's degree from the University of Dar es Salaam in 1980, before completing a PhD at the University of East Anglia, England, in 1988. His PhD was entitled "Evaluation of externally funded regional integrated development programmes (RIDEPs) in Tanzania case studies of Kigoma, Tanga and Iringa regions". He worked as a lecturer at the University of Dar es Salaam (1976–1984) and as a senior lecturer at Sokoine University of Agriculture (1984–1993). He was economic advisor to President Ali Hassan Mwinyi (1993–1995). He served as Minister for Natural Resources and Tourism (1995–1996), Minister for Industry and Trade (2001–2005), and was Minister for Planning, Economy and Empowerment from 2006 to 2008.
