= Joseph Maina Mungai =

- Born: 4 April 1932; Kenya
- Died: 13 August 2003 (aged 71)
- Education: University College of London
- Occupation: Dean of the School of Medicine at the University of Nairobi
- Children: 4

Joseph Maina Mungai (4 April 1932, Kenya – 13 August 2003) was the first African to become Dean of the School of Medicine at the University of Nairobi. Besides a medical journal editor position, and a long-term stint as a newspaper correspondent, he was also Head and faculty member of the Department of Anatomy.

== Education ==
Mungai completed high school at Alliance Boys' High School (now Alliance High School) in Kikuyu, Kenya, and attended medical school at Makerere University, qualifying for licensing as a medical surgeon in 1961. In 1962, he registered on the Kenya Medical Practitioner and Dental Board. He enrolled and completed studies in the East African medical studies program of the University College of London (UK), from which he received his medical and surgical degrees (MB., Ch.B.) in 1964. He completed his doctorate (PhD) studies while in London.

== Scientific work ==
His scientific work began with neurologic research while studying for his doctorate in London, UK, and continuing into the 1980s., he has also been described as a pioneer medical researcher in East Africa. In the early 1970s, Mungai co-authored anthropological papers with Richard Leakey and Alan C. Walker, formerly of Makere University and University of Nairobi, more recently Pennsylvania State University, United States.

== Deanship ==
As Dean, beginning in the late 1960s, Mungai was instrumental in founding of the university's School of Medicine. In an article narrating a 1972 visit to the major universities in three African Great Lakes countries (Uganda, Tanzania, and Kenya) by the Dean of the College of Medicine at Washington, DC's Howard University, Marion Mann (Howard University alumnus 1954), mention is made of his visit to the University of Nairobi where he met Mungai.

== Vice-chancellor ==
Mungai was for a brief period in 1970, the university's Acting Vice-Chancellor since the end of Arthur Thomas Porter's term as Principal of the University College, Nairobi in 1970. The end of Porter's term coincided with the dissolution of the University of East Africa, which had been composed of three colleges (University College, Nairobi and those at Makerere and Dar es Salaam); and the formation in their place of three distinct national universities: the University of Nairobi in Kenya, Makerere University in Uganda, and the University of Dar es Salaam in Tanzania.

In 1970, President Jomo Kenyatta appointed Josephat Karanja, a former ambassador to Britain, as the University of Nairobi's first Vice-Chancellor. Mungai was appointed as Deputy Vice-Chancellor, and retained that position until 1979. Mungai returned to the role of Vice-Chancellor of the university in 1979, when Karanja left academia to return to his political career. He completed his Vice-Chancellorship term in 1985, and moved on to other posts.

== National and international appointments ==
Mungai was one of 24 selectees for appointment as council-members on the University Council of the United Nations University (UNU) in 1974,. He resigned his seat there in 1976. During the mid- to late 1970s, he was assigned a trusteeship on the Kenya Hospital Authority Trust Fund; and in 1977 appointed as the first Chairman of the National Council for Science & Technology.

In October 1969, Jeremiah J.M. Nyagah, Minister for Natural Resources, appointed Mungai as a member of the Museum Trustees of Kenya. Previously, while still in his early twenties, Mungai had joined with Joel Ojai and Thomas Odhiambo – who in later years was an entomologist and environmental scientist – in helping Louis Leakey, prominent archaeologist and pioneer in East African anthropology and palaeontology, found the Kenya Museum Associates. The entity was formed in 1955, with its objectives and goals set towards fund-raising and financing of palaeontological programs and activities.

Since then, the Kenya Museum Associates has been replaced by the Kenya Museum Society, a fund-raising, promotion, training, and support entity for the National Museums of Kenya (NMK) established in 1971 by Richard Leakey, Kenyan conservationist, archaeologist, and palaeontologist, who is the son of Louis Leakey and his wife, British archaeologist and anthropologist Mary Leakey. In 1979, he was again appointed as a member of the Museum Trustees of Kenya.

Appointments which followed during the 1980s included membership on the Kenya National Examination Council, the University Grants Committee (two terms), the Governing Body of the Egerton Agricultural College (now Egerton University), and a short-term Committee for Review of Terms and Conditions (including pay and benefits, working conditions, working culture, productivity and efficiency) for staff members of the national universities. For a number of years beginning in 1985, he was appointed (with annual renewal of appointment) as Secretary of the Commission for Higher Education, an accrediting body for public and private educational institutes. While in that capacity, Mungai was an authorising party for establishment of the Kenya Methodist University.

In August 1989, Mungai was appointed as a member of the Board of Governors of the NMK.

== National honours ==
Mungai's academic career, coupled with his service to Kenya earned him ranking, in 2002, on the National Honour Roll in the Order of Moran of the Golden Heart of Kenya (MGH), presented to him on 12 December 2002 by President Moi ). The MGH designation is higher than one he had received in 1995 for his role while university don --- that of ranking as an Elder of the Burning Spear (EBS). Moi had paid tribute to Mungai for his 40-year teaching career and noted that the retired academician's life had been dedicated more "to education rather than the pursuit of wealth".

== Family and church ==
In his private life, Mungai was a devoted family man and an active church elder with the St. Andrew's Presbyterian Church of Nairobi, which is a member church of the PCEA (Presbyterian Church of East Africa). Mungai died in August 2003. Ceremonies conducted a week later were attended by 'thousands'. He was survived by his wife, four children, and his grandchildren.

== Publications ==
Books

- "From Simple to Complex: The Journey of a Herdsboy", an autobiography by J.M. Mungai. Kenway Publications (2002); 288 p.
- "Research and Education in Kenya: Utilisation of Research Done at Kenyatta University to Advance Education", J.M. Mungai, Kenyatta University Nairobi (1999); 321 p.

Research and journal papers (list excludes letters and newspaper articles):

- African Journal of Health Science; 5 (1): 2–7 (Jan.-Mar. 1998): "Structured AIDS Education Inspires Self-expression of Needs and Beneficial Changes"
- African Journal of Health Science.; 5 (2): 49 (1998): "Integrating Health Research With Socio-cultural Systems in the Fight Against HIV/AIDS"
- African Journal of Health Science; 5 (1–2): 50–57 (Apr.-Jun. 1998): "Research Publications Are Important Performance Indicators of University Medical Education in African Countries"
- African Journal of Health Science.; 1 (3): 99 (Jul.-Sep. 1994): "Sustaining Quality and Relevance of Medical Education in Developing Countries", ai.
- African Journal of Health Science; 1 (1): 2 (Jan.-Mar. 1994): "Research for Development: Maximisation of Utilisation of Research Results",
- Anatomical Record (2): 152–6 (Oct. 1987): "Segmental Variations in the Elastic Fiber Content of the Lateral Costotransverse Ligaments in the Vervet Monkey (Cercopithecus pygerythrus aethiops)", with J. K. Kimani andA. H. Walji,
- Acta Anaomica (Basel); 115 (2): 117–33 (1983): "Observations on the Structure and Innervation of the Presumptive Carotid Sinus Area in the Giraffe (Giraffa camelopardalis)", with J. K. Kimani
- American Journal of Physical Anthropology; 36 (2): 235-251/52 (Mar. 1972): "New Australopithecines from East Rudolf, Kenya. II.", with R. E. Leakey, and A. C. Walker.
- American Journal of Physical Anthropology; 35: 175–186 (1971): "New Australopithecines from East Rudolf, Kenya. I.", with R. E. Leakey, and A. C. Walker.
- .; 101 (Pt 3): 403–18 (Jun. 1967): "Dendritic Patterns in the Somatic Sensory Cortex of the Cat", Joseph M. Mungai.
