= John Chiligati =

Tanzanian politician

Honourable Ret. Captain John Chiligati MP

Member of Parliament for Manyoni East
- In office November 2000 – November 2015
- Succeeded by: Pius Stephen Chaya

Personal details
- Born: John Zefania Chiligati; 14 October 1950 (age 75) Tanganyika
- Party: CCM
- Education: Mazengo Secondary School; Usagara Secondary School; Monduli Military Academy; University of Dar es Salaam

Military service
- Allegiance: United Rep. of Tanzania
- Branch/service: Tanzanian Army
- Years of service: 1978–1979
- Rank: Captain

John Zefania Chiligati (born 14 October 1950) is a Tanzanian CCM politician and Member of Parliament for Manyoni East constituency from to 2000 to 2015.

== Career ==
After serving as a deputy minister, Chiligati was promoted to the position of Minister of Home Affairs in the Cabinet named by President Jakaya Kikwete on 4 January 2006. He was then moved to the post of Minister of Labour and Youth Development on 15 October 2006 before being named Minister of Lands and Human Development on 12 February 2008.
