= Ministry of Transport (Tanzania) =

Government ministry of Tanzania

- Wizara ya Usafiri (Swahili)

Ministry overview
- Jurisdiction: Tanzania
- Headquarters: Dar es Salaam
- Minister responsible: eng.Isack Kamwelwe
- Deputy Minister responsible: eng Atashasta Justus Nditiye
- Ministry executive: Permanent Secretary
- Website: Ministry website

The Ministry of Transport is the governmental body of Tanzania with "primary responsibility for Transport Policy, Planning and Coordination functions as well as oversight of Infrastructure delivery and asset management."
