= Batilda Salha Burian =

Tanzanian politician and ambassador

- Born: October 19, 1965 (age 60)
- Citizenship: Tanzania
- Education: University College of London
- Occupation: Politician
- Movement: Climate change

Batilda Salha Burian (born October 19, 1965) is a Tanzanian politician and ambassador. She is currently Regional Commissioner of Tanga Region.

== Biography ==
Burian received her PhD from the University College of London in 1992.

She served two terms in Parliament, from 2000 to 2005 and then in 2006 to 2010. Between her terms in Parliament, she was the Deputy Minister of Community Development, Gender and Children. After Parliament, she became the High Commissioner (or ambassador) of Tanzania in Kenya. During her time as the ambassador to Kenya, she continued to strengthen ties between the two countries, citing that both countries have much in common both culturally and environmentally. In 2015, she became the Tanzanian ambassador to Japan.

Burian has chaired the World Climate Change Forum III in 2009 in Geneva and is also a permanent representative of Tanzania to the United Nations Environment Program (UNEP).
