= Fenella Mukangara =

Tanzanian CCM politician

Minister of Information, Culture and Sports
- In office 7 May 2012 – 5 November 2015
- President: Jakaya Kikwete

Member of Parliament
- In office November 2010 – July 2015=
- Constituency: None (Special Seat)

Personal details
- Born: 13 December 1955 (age 70) Tanganyika
- Party: CCM
- Education: UDSM (BA); Canberra College of Advanced Education (PG); University of Sheffield (MA); University of Natal (PhD)

Fenella Ephraim Mukangara (born 13 December 1955) is a Tanzanian CCM politician and a special seat Member of Parliament since 2010. She is the current Minister of Information, Culture and Sports.
