= Kingunge Ngombale–Mwiru =

Tanzanian politician (1930–2018)

Member of Parliament
- In office 2000 – 16 July 2010
- Appointed by: Benjamin Mkapa; Jakaya Kikwete
- Constituency: None (Nominated MP)

Minister of State in President's Office for Political and Public Affairs
- In office January 2006 – February 2008
- President: Jakaya Kikwete

Personal details
- Born: 30 May 1930
- Died: 2 February 2018 (aged 87)
- Party: CCM (1977–2015)
- Spouse: Peras Kingunge
- Children: Kinjekitile Kingunge; Martin Ngombale

Kingunge Ngombale–Mwiru (30 May 1930) – 2 February 2018 was a Tanzanian politician.

Kingunge was a leader in the Tanganyika African National Union (TANU).

Kingunge was not religious, although he respected all religions. He was known for taking oaths without using any holy book, such as the Bible or the Quran. Instead, he would take the oaths for his governmental positions by using the Tanzanian Constitution.

== Political career ==
After several years as the head of the CCM, Ngombale–Mwiru abruptly left the party in 2015.
