= Jumanne Maghembe =

Tanzanian politician

Hon. Professor Juamanne Maghembe MP
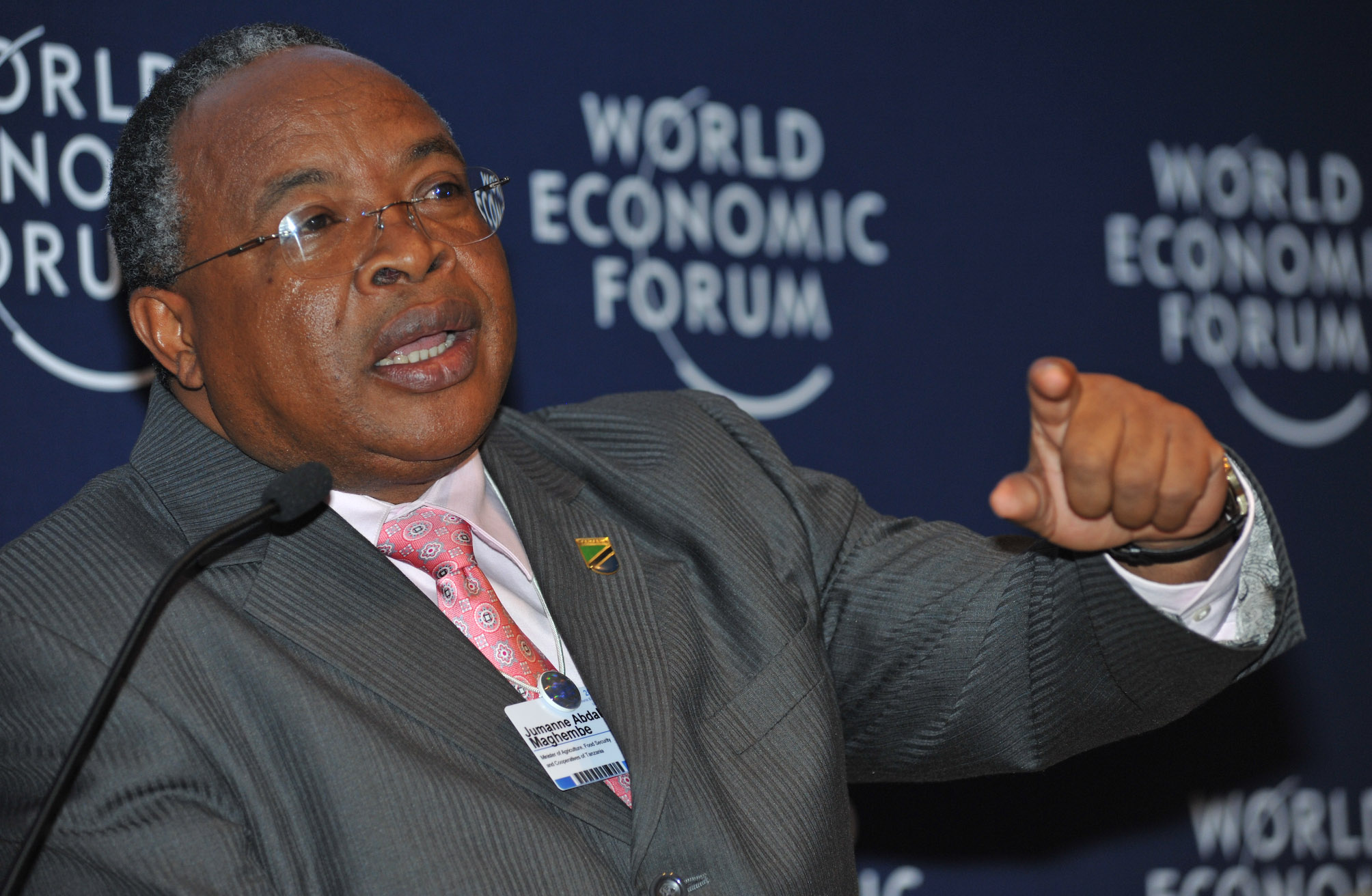

Minister of Natural Resources and Tourism
- In office 5 November 2015 – 7 October 2017
- President: John Magufuli
- Succeeded by: Hamisi Kigwangalla

7th Minister of Water and Irrigation
- In office 7 February 2012 – 5 November 2015
- President: Jakaya Kikwete
- Preceded by: Mark Mwandosya

Minister of Agriculture, Food and Cooperatives
- In office 28 November 2010 – 7 February 2012
- President: Jakaya Kikwete
- Succeeded by: Christopher Chiza

Minister of Education and Vocational Training
- In office 13 February 2008 – 28 November 2010

Minister of Natural Resources and Tourism
- In office 17 October 2006 – 13 February 2008

Minister of Labour, Employment and Youth Development
- In office 6 January 2006 – 17 October 2008

Member of Parliament for Mwanga
- Incumbent
- Assumed office November 2000

Personal details
- Born: Tanganyika
- Party: CCM
- Education: UDSM (BSc), (PhD); Agricult. Uni. of Norway (MSc); Duke University (MF); ICRAF (Postdoc)

Jumanne Abdallah Maghembe is a former minister of natural resources and tourism for the United Republic of Tanzania. He has been a member of parliament for Mwanga constituency since 2000 until 2020.

== Minister of natural resources and tourism – 2015 to 2017 ==
At the beginning of his appointment, Jumanne Maghembe called for a focus on illegal logging and wildlife poaching, as well as working towards doubling tourism's contribution to Tanzania's economy.

== Political career ==
Before his current position, Professor Maghembe's was serving as Minister of Water and Irrigation, beginning in February 2012 and ending in November 2015.

== Education and academia ==
In 1975, Maghembe graduated with a degree in forestry from the University of Dar es Salaam. In 1981 he completed a PhD at the University of Dar es Salaam. In 1986 he was a Fulbright Scholar at Oregon State University. For fifteen years he was a principal scientist at the International Center for Research in Agroforestry (ICRAF).
