= Muhammed Seif Khatib =

Tanzanian politician (1951–2021)

Honourable Dr Muhammed Khatib MP

CCM Secretary for Organisation
- In office November 2012 – 2016
- Chairman: Jakaya Kikwete

Member of Parliament for Uzini
- In office November 1995 – October 2015

Personal details
- Born: 10 January 1951 Sultanate of Zanzibar
- Died: 15 February 2021 (aged 70) Unguja
- Party: CCM
- Education: UDSM (BA); SOAS (MA); University of Dodoma (PhD)

Muhammed Seif Khatib (10 January 1951 – 15 February 2021) was a Tanzanian CCM politician and Member of Parliament for Uzini constituency since 1995.

== Career ==
Khatib was the National Youth Chairman of the Chama Cha Mapinduzi (CCM) from 1978 to 1983 and was a member of the CCM's National Executive Council from 1978 to 2002. After serving as Minister of State in the Prime Minister's Office responsible for Information, he was appointed Minister of Information, Culture and Sports in the Cabinet named on 4 January 2006. Subsequently, he was named Minister in the Vice-President's Office for Union Affairs on 12 February 2008.
