= Ministry of Constitutional and Legal Affairs =

Government ministry of Tanzania

- Wizara ya Katiba na Mambo ya Sheria (Swahili)

Ministry overview
- Formed: 2006
- Jurisdiction: Government of Tanzania
- Headquarters: Mkwepu/Sokoine, Dar es Salaam; 6°49′6″S 39°17′22″E
- Minister responsible: Damas Ndumbaro
- Deputy Minister responsible: Geoffrey Mizengo Pinda
- Ministry executive: Prof. Sifuni Mchome, Permanent Secretary
- Website: sheria.go.tz

The Ministry of Constitution and Legal Affairs is a government ministry of Tanzania that was formed in 2006. The ministry is responsible for creating and promoting good governance, justice, and equality by ensuring universal access to legal services.

== History ==
The Ministry has undergone a number of name changes throughout its history. Most recently, the ministry was renamed under John Magufuli's first cabinet formed in 2015 to the Ministry of Constitutional and Legal Affairs.

== Institutions ==
- Judiciary of Tanzania
- Attorney General's Chambers
- Law Reform Commission of Tanzania
- Commission for Human Rights and Good Governance
- Registration, Insolvency and Trusteeship Agency
- The Law School of Tanzania
- Institute of Judicial Administration

== List of ministers ==
- Mary Nagu (2006–2008) (1st Minister / 1st female)
- Mathias Chikawe (2008–2014)
- Asha-Rose Migiro (2014–2015)
- Palamagamba John Aidan Mwaluko Kabudi (2015–2019)
- Augustine Mahiga (2019–2020)
- Mwigulu Lameki Nchemba 2020-2021
- Palamagamba Kabudi (2021–Present)

== See also ==
- Attorney General of Tanzania
- Justice ministry
- Politics of Tanzania
