= Terezya Huvisa =

Tanzanian CCM politician

Honourable Dr Terezya Pius Luoga Huvisa MP

3rd Minister of State for Environment
- In office 28 November 2004 – 20 January 2014
- VP: Mohamed Gharib Bilal
- Succeeded by: Binilith Mahenge

Member of Parliament
- Incumbent
- Assumed office November 2010
- Constituency: None (Special Seat)

Personal details
- Born: 12 June 1957 (age 69) Iringa Region, Tanganyika Territory
- Party: CCM
- Education: UDSM (BSc), (MA); Sokoine University of Agriculture (PhD)
- Positions: Dean, DUCE (2007-10)
- Nickname: Mother of Environment

Terezya Pius Luoga Huvisa (born 12 June 1957) is a Tanzanian CCM politician and a special seat Member of Parliament since 2010. She also served as the Minister of State in the Vice President's Office for Environment from 2010 to 2014.

Terezya Pius Luoga Huvisa also worked as Dean of Students at the Dar es Salaam University College of Education (DUCE), Assistant Dean of Students at the University of Dar es Salaam (UDSM). Throughout her career working in the two big universities in Tanzania Terezya Pius Luoga Huvisa has also actively supported youth and women development using education, seminars and trainings which is her passion.

Terezya Pius Luoga Huvisa was the first Tanzania female government leader to take action on monthly cleaning of the city of Dar es Salaam and also the first Tanzania female minister to take initiative to prevent business owners from improper dumping of wastes from industries and hotels. Terezya Pius Luoga Huvisa was recognized for her works in protecting the environment at an international level by the African Ministerial Conference on Environment (AMCEN), who elected Terezya Pius Luoga Huvisa as the President of AMCEN.
