= Ministry of Labour and Employment (Tanzania) =

Government ministry of Tanzania

Ministry of State, Prime Minister's Office (Labour, Youth, Employment and Persons with Disability)
- Wizara ya Kazi, Ajira Vijana na watu wenye ulemavu (Swahili)

Ministry overview
- Jurisdiction: Tanzania
- Headquarters: Kazi Street, Government City, Mtumba, Dodoma
- Minister responsible: Hon. Prof. Joyce Lazaro Ndalichako
- Deputy Minister responsible: Hon. Patrobas Paschal Katambi
- Ministry executive: Permanent Secretary
- Website: kazi.go.tz

The Prime Minister’s Office – Labour, Youth, Employment and Persons with Disabilities (PMO-LYED) can be traced back from the time when our country got independence in 1961. From 1961 to 1962 the Ministry was known as Ministry of Labour and Healthy; Ministry of Communication (1962 to 1968), Ministry of Communication, Transport and Labour (1968 to 1972); Ministry of Labour and Social Welfare (1972 to 1984); Ministry of Labour and Manpower Development (1985 to 1988); Ministry of Labour Culture and Social Welfare (1989 to 1990); Ministry of Labour, Youth Development and Sports (1990 to 2006); Ministry of Labour, Employment and Youth Development (2006 to 2010); Ministry of Labour and Employment (2010 to 2015) and Prime Minister’s Office – Labour, Youth, Employment and Persons with Disabilities (PMO-LYED) (2015 to date). Notwithstanding of all these changes Labour remains the core concern. Those changes was official approved by the President of the United Republic of Tanzania and became operational on 7 July 2018. The structure was designed to facilitate the implementation of the mandates of the Office as provided for in the Notice on assignment of Ministerial Functions (Instruments) Vide Government Notice No.144 of April 2016 and its amendment of 7 October 2017.
