= Ministry of Water =

Government ministry of Tanzania

- Wizara ya Maji (Swahili)

Ministry overview
- Jurisdiction: Government of Tanzania
- Headquarters: Dodoma
- Motto: Maji ni Uhai
- Annual budget: TZS 1.016 trillion
- Minister responsible: Jumaa Aweso
- Deputy Minister responsible: Maryprisca Mahundi
- Ministry executive: Permanent Secretary
- Website: www.maji.go.tz

The Ministry of Water is the government ministry principally responsible for water supply and water resources in Tanzania. The ministry's offices are located in Dodoma. The Minister of Water is Jumaa Aweso.

== Operations and organization ==
The work of the ministry is divided into the core function, related to water, and the support function, related to administrative work.

The core function includes the following divisions:

- Water Resources Division
- Water Supply and Sanitation Division
- Water Quality Services Division

== Vision and Mission ==
To address the demands of the populace, the Ministry of Water strives to make clean and safe water accessible to Tanzanians. Its goal is to create a water-secure nation where people can access clean water resources in a sustainable manner. Its primary goals are to provide national food security, industrial economic growth, and better access to clean drinking water and sanitation services. Teamwork, integrity, accountability, excellence, and innovation are the ministry's guiding principles.
