= Ministry of Infrastructure Development (Tanzania) =

Government ministry in Tanzania

The Ministry of Infrastructure Development of Tanzania is responsible for coordinating and financing the development of the infrastructure of the country. Its mandate includes marine, aviation, roads, and other construction projects, and its responsibilities include working with the National Assembly in creating budgets and long-term project planning.

Ministry offices are located in Dar es Salaam. The Minister of Infrastructure Development is

== Organization and operations ==
The work of the ministry is broadly organized into departments, authorities, agencies and institutions.

=== Departments ===
Departmental work within the ministry itself is organized into:

- Roads Division
- Transport Division
- Safety and Environment Unit
- ...and many various administrative divisions and units.

The responsibilities of the ministry are devolved to a number of authorities and agencies.

=== Authorities ===
- Tanzania Airports Authority
- Tanzania Civil Aviation Authority
- Tanzania Ports Authority
- Surface and Marine Transport Regulatory Authority

=== Agencies ===
- Air Tanzania
- Architects and Quantity Surveyors Registration Board
- Contractors Registration Board
- Engineers Registration Board
- National Board for Materials Management
- National Construction Council
- Tanzania Building Agency
- Tanzania Clearing and Forwarding Agency
- Tanzania Electrical Mechanical & Electronics Services
- Tanzania Government Flight Agency
- Tanzania Government Stores
- Tanzania National Roads Agency
- Tanzania Railway Corporation
- Tanzania Zambia Railway

=== Institutions ===
Related institutions within the Tanzanian government include:

- Appropriate Technology Training Institute
- Dar es Salaam Maritime Institute
- National Institute of Transport

== See also ==
- Economy of Tanzania
- Government of Tanzania
- Transport in Tanzania
