= Suluhu Cabinet =

Cabinet of Tanzania

- 6th Cabinet of Tanzania

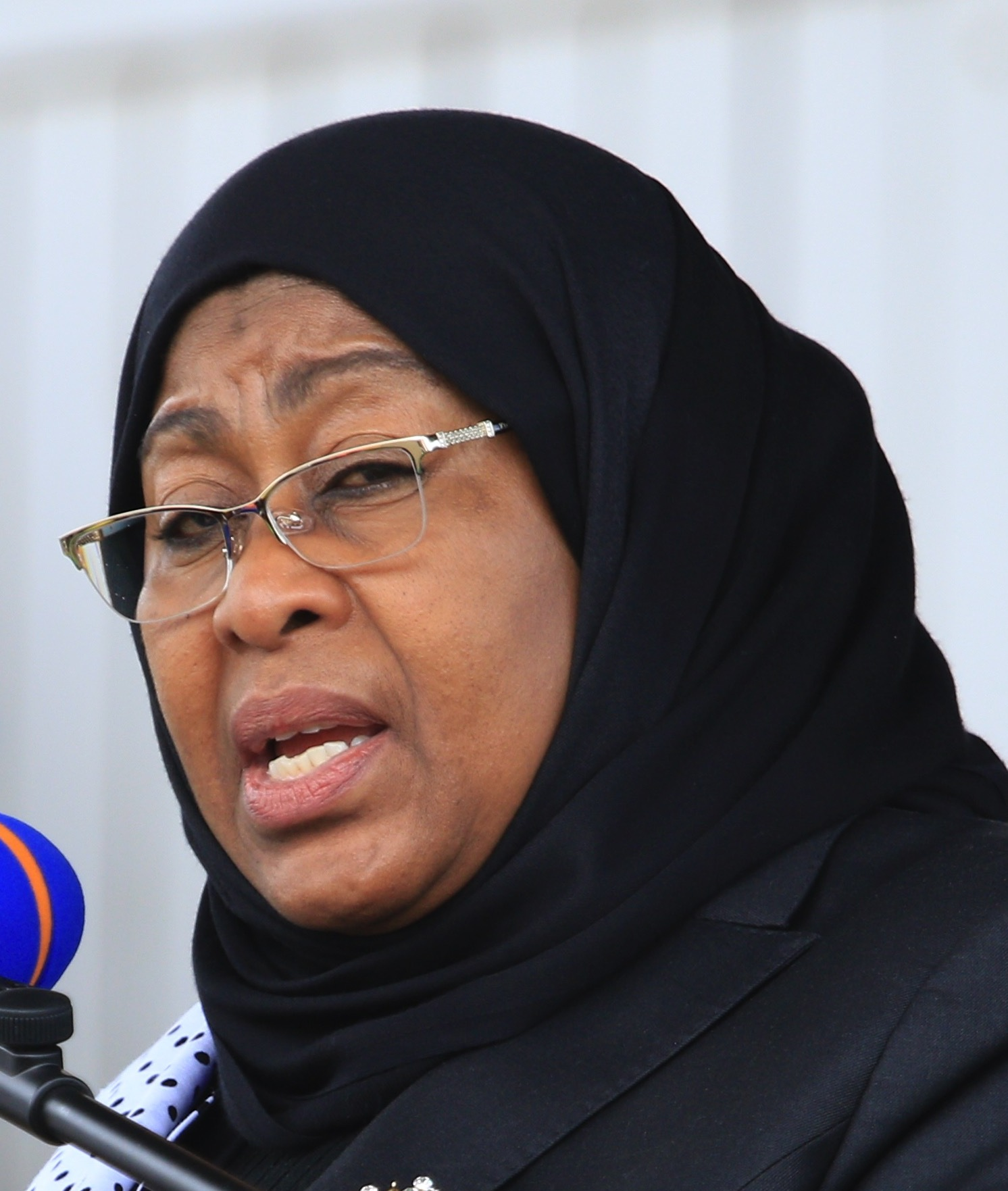
- Date formed: 31 March 2021

People and organisations
- Head of state: Samia Suluhu
- Head of government: Samia Suluhu
- No. of ministers: 24
- Member party: CCM
- Status in legislature: Majority
- Opposition party: ACT-Wazalendo; CUF; CHADEMA

History
- Election: 2020 general election
- Legislature term: 5 years
- Predecessor: Magufuli cabinet

The Suluhu Cabinet was officially formed in Tanzania on 31 March 2021. Following the death of former President John Magufuli, Samia Suluhu Hassan the Vice President in the previous cabinet was sworn in as the new president. Within two weeks of her assignment, she appointed a new vice president and reshuffled the previous cabinet.

== First Term ==
=== Inaugural Cabinet ===
This marks the first cabinet in Tanzanian history with a female president. The inaugural cabinet was confirmed on 31 March 2021.

Party key
Chama Cha Mapinduzi

Cabinet of Tanzania: 31 March 2021 - 12 September 2021
Portrait	Portfolio	Incumbent
	President; Commander-in-chief of the Armed Forces	Samia Suluhu
	Vice President	Philip Mpango
	President of Zanzibar (Semi-autonomous region)	Hussein Mwinyi
	Prime Minister	Kassim Majaliwa MP
	Ministers of State in the President's Office; Regional Administration, Local Government, Civil Service and Good Governance	George Mkuchika MP
	Ministers of State in the President's Office; Regional Administration, Local Government, Civil Service and Good Governance	Ummy Mwalimu MP
	Ministers of State in the President's Office; Regional Administration, Local Government, Civil Service and Good Governance	Mohamed Mchengerwa MP
	Minister of State in the Vice President's Office; Union Affairs and Environment	Selemani Jafo MP
	Minister of State in the Prime Minister's Office; Policy, Parliamentary Affairs, Labour, Employment, Youth and the Disabled	Jenista Mhagama MP
	Minister of State in the Prime Minister's Office; Policy, Parliamentary Affairs, Labour, Employment, Youth and the Disabled	Geoffrey Mwambe MP
	Minister of Agriculture	Adolf Mkenda MP
	Minister of Livestock and Fisheries	Mashimba Ndaki MP
	Minister of Constitutional Affairs and Justice	Palamagamba Kabudi MP
	Minister of Defence and National Service	Elias John Kwandikwa MP
	Minister of Education, Science, Technology and Vocational Training	Joyce Ndalichako MP
	Minister of Energy	Medard Kalemani MP
	Minister of Minerals	Doto Biteko MP
	Minister of Finance and Planning	Mwigulu Nchemba MP
	Minister of Foreign Affairs, E.A.C., Regional and International Cooperation	Liberata Mulamula MP
	Minister of Health, Community Development, Gender, Seniors and Children	Dorothy Gwajima MP
	Minister of Home Affairs	George Simbachawene MP
	Minister of Industry and Trade	Kitila Mkumbo MP
	Minister of Information, Culture, Artists and Sports	Innocent Bashungwa MP
	Minister of Lands, Housing and Human Settlements	William Lukuvi MP
	Minister of Natural Resources and Tourism	Damas Ndumbaro MP
	Minister of Works and Transport	Leonard Chamuriho MP
	Minister of Water and Irrigation	Jumaa Aweso MP
	Minister of Communication & ICT	Faustine Ndugulile MP
Also attending Cabinet meetings (excluding voting rights)
	Attorney General	Adelardus Kilangi

==== Changes ====
- On 2 August 2021, Elias John Kwandikwa died.

=== First Cabinet Reshuffle ===
Suluhu conducted her first major cabinet reshuffle on September 12, 2021. Dr Stergomena Tax filled the empty seat of Kwandikwa as the Minister of Defence and National Service as the first female to hold the position in the country's history. A new attorney general was also appointed Dr Eliezer Feleshi replaced Adelardus Kilangi.

Party key
Chama Cha Mapinduzi

Cabinet of Tanzania: 12 September 2021 - 8 January 2022
Portrait	Portfolio	Incumbent
	President; Commander-in-chief of the Armed Forces	Samia Suluhu
	Vice President	Philip Mpango
	President of Zanzibar (Semi-autonomous region)	Hussein Mwinyi
	Prime Minister	Kassim Majaliwa MP
	Ministers of State in the President's Office; Regional Administration, Local Government, Civil Service and Good Governance	George Mkuchika MP
	Ministers of State in the President's Office; Regional Administration, Local Government, Civil Service and Good Governance	Ummy Mwalimu MP
	Ministers of State in the President's Office; Regional Administration, Local Government, Civil Service and Good Governance	Mohamed Mchengerwa MP
	Minister of State in the Vice President's Office; Union Affairs and Environment	Selemani Jafo MP
	Minister of State in the Prime Minister's Office; Policy, Parliamentary Affairs, Labour, Employment, Youth and the Disabled	Jenista Mhagama MP
	Minister of State in the Prime Minister's Office; Policy, Parliamentary Affairs, Labour, Employment, Youth and the Disabled	Geoffrey Mwambe MP
	Minister of Agriculture	Adolf Mkenda MP
	Minister of Livestock and Fisheries	Mashimba Ndaki MP
	Minister of Constitutional Affairs and Justice	Palamagamba KabudiMP
	Minister of Defence and National Service	Stergomena Tax MP
	Minister of Education, Science, Technology and Vocational Training	Joyce Ndalichako MP
	Minister of Energy	January Makamba MP
	Minister of Minerals	Doto Biteko MP
	Minister of Finance and Planning	Mwigulu Nchemba MP
	Minister of Foreign Affairs, E.A.C., Regional and International Cooperation	Liberata Mulamula MP
	Minister of Health, Community Development, Gender, Seniors and Children	Dorothy Gwajima MP
	Minister of Home Affairs	George Simbachawene MP
	Minister of Industry and Trade	Kitila Mkumbo MP
	Minister of Culture, Artists and Sports	Innocent Bashungwa MP
	Minister of Lands, Housing and Human Settlements	William Lukuvi MP
	Minister of Natural Resources and Tourism	Damas Ndumbaro MP
	Minister of Works and Transport	Makame Mbarawa MP
	Minister of Water and Irrigation	Jumaa Aweso MP
	Minister of News, Communication & ICT	Ashatu Kijaji MP
Also attending Cabinet meetings (excluding voting rights)
	Attorney General	Eliezer Feleshi

=== Second Cabinet Reshuffle ===
On 31 December 2021 Samia Suluhu gave her first new years address to the nation. During the address, she hinted that she would be carrying out a cabinet reshuffle to expel ministers she suspects of siding with rival politicians in the party. On 8 January 2022 she announced her new cabinet, reshuffling ministers and creating two new cabinet positions. The first being the Prime Minister's Office Policy, Parliamentary Affairs, Labour, Employment, Youth and the Disabled was split into two: Policy and Parliament Affairs; and Labour, Youth, Employment and Persons with Disabilities. The second being the split of the Ministry of Health, Community Development, Gender, Seniors and Children into the Minister of Health Development, Seniors and Children; and the Ministry of Community Development & Gender.

All new ministers resumed their new post on 10 January 2022.

Party key
Chama Cha Mapinduzi

Cabinet of Tanzania: 10 January 2022 – 30 August 2023
Portrait	Portfolio	Incumbent
	President; Commander-in-chief of the Armed Forces	Samia Suluhu
	Vice President	Philip Mpango
	President of Zanzibar (Semi-autonomous region)	Hussein Mwinyi
	Prime Minister	Kassim Majaliwa MP
	Ministers of State in the President's Office; Regional Administration, Local Government, Civil Service, Good Governance, Planning and Investment	George Mkuchika MP
	Ministers of State in the President's Office; Regional Administration, Local Government, Civil Service, Good Governance, Planning and Investment	George Simbachawene MP
	Ministers of State in the President's Office; Regional Administration, Local Government, Civil Service, Good Governance, Planning and Investment	Angellah Kairuki MP
	Ministers of State in the President's Office; Regional Administration, Local Government, Civil Service, Good Governance, Planning and Investment	Kitila Mkumbo
	Minister of State in the Vice President's Office; Union Affairs and Environment	Selemani Jafo MP
	Minister of State in the Prime Minister's Office; Policy, Parliamentary Affairs, Labour, Employment, Youth and the Disabled	Joyce Ndalichako MP
	Minister of State in the Prime Minister's Office; Policy, Parliamentary Affairs, Labour, Employment, Youth and the Disabled	Jenista Mhagama MP
	Minister of Agriculture	Hussein Bashe MP
	Minister of Livestock and Fisheries	Abdallah Ulega MP
	Minister of Constitutional Affairs and Justice	Damas Ndumbaro MP
	Minister of Defence and National Service	Innocent Bashungwa MP
	Minister of Education, Science, Technology and Vocational Training	Adolf Mkenda MP
	Minister of Energy	January Makamba MP
	Minister of Minerals	Doto Biteko MP
	Minister of Finance	Mwigulu Nchemba MP
	Minister of Foreign Affairs, E.A.C., Regional and International Cooperation	Stergomena Tax MP
	Minister of Health, Seniors and Children	Ummy Mwalimu MP
	Minister of Community Development & Gender	Dorothy Gwajima MP
	Minister of Home Affairs	Hamad Masauni MP
	Minister of Industry & Trade	Ashatu Kijaji MP
	Minister of Culture, Artists and Sports	Pindi Chana MP
	Minister of Lands, Housing and Human Settlements	Angeline Mabula MP
	Minister of Natural Resources and Tourism	Mohamed Mchengerwa MP
	Minister of Works and Transport	Makame Mbarawa MP
	Minister of Water and Irrigation	Jumaa Aweso MP
	Minister of News, Communication & ICT	Nape Nnauye MP
Also attending Cabinet meetings (excluding voting rights)
	Attorney General	Eliezer Feleshi

==== Changes ====
- On 1 April 2022, president Suluhu made a small shift of the dockets of three ministers. Minister George Simbachawene moves to the Office of the Prime Minister - Parliament, Policy and Coordination, replacing Dr Pindi Chana. Dr Chana moved to the Ministry of Natural Resources and Tourism, replacing Dr Damas Ndumabro. Dr Ndumabro takes over Simbacawene's previous role as the Minister of Constitutional and Legal Affairs.
- On 2 October 2022, president Suluhu dropped Liberata Mulamula as the Minister of Foreign Affairs, E.A.C., Regional and International Cooperation, and replaced her with Dr Stergomena Tax. Dr Tax's previous post as the Minister of Defense was given to Innocent Bashungwa. Innocent's previous post as Minister of State in the President's Office Regional Administration and Local Government was given to Angellah Kairuki.
- On 14 February 2023, Mohamed Mchengerwa switched cabinet positions with Pindi Chana and became the new Minister of Natural Resources and Tourism and Pindi Chana became the new Minister of Culture, Artists and Sports.
- On 26 February 2023, Abdallah Ulega was promoted to be the Minister for Livestock and Fisheries, replacing Mashimba Ndaki. In the re-shuffle, the Ministry for Investment was moved into the presidents office.
- On 1 April 2023, president Suluhu switched the positions of Jenista Mhagama and George Simbachawene, moving Simbachawene from the Prime Minister's office to the President's office.
- On 4 July 2023, president Suluhu made some changes to the cabinet mandates.
  - The Ministry of Finance and Planning was re-established as the Ministry of Finance and Mwigulu Nchemba retained his position.
  - The Ministry Investment, Industry and Trade was re-established as the Ministry Industry and Trade and Ashatu Kijaji retained her position.
  - A new office was created in the presidents office, the Minister of State in the President's Office Planning and Investment, and Kitila Mkumbo was appointed as minister.

=== Third Cabinet Reshuffle ===
On 30 August 2023 Samia Suluhu made a third major reshuffled of the cabinet. The position of deputy prime minister was added and Doto Biteko was only the third person ever to be appointed in this position. Furthermore, the Ministry of Works and Transport was split into two with a new Ministry of Works and a Ministry of Transport.

All new ministers resumed their new post on 1 September 2023.

Party key
Chama Cha Mapinduzi

Cabinet of Tanzania: 1 September 2023 – July 2024
Portrait	Portfolio	Incumbent
	President; Commander-in-chief of the Armed Forces	Samia Suluhu
	Vice President	Philip Mpango
	President of Zanzibar (Semi-autonomous region)	Hussein Mwinyi
	Prime Minister	Kassim Majaliwa MP
	Deputy Prime Minister & Minister of Energy	Doto Biteko MP
	Ministers of State in the President's Office; Regional Administration, Local Government, Civil Service, Good Governance, Planning and Investment	George Mkuchika MP
	Ministers of State in the President's Office; Regional Administration, Local Government, Civil Service, Good Governance, Planning and Investment	George Simbachawene MP
	Ministers of State in the President's Office; Regional Administration, Local Government, Civil Service, Good Governance, Planning and Investment	Mohamed Mchengerwa MP
	Ministers of State in the President's Office; Regional Administration, Local Government, Civil Service, Good Governance, Planning and Investment	Kitila Mkumbo
	Minister of State in the Vice President's Office; Union Affairs and Environment	Selemani Jafo MP
	Minister of State in the Prime Minister's Office; Policy, Parliamentary Affairs, Labour, Employment, Youth and the Disabled	Joyce Ndalichako MP
	Minister of State in the Prime Minister's Office; Policy, Parliamentary Affairs, Labour, Employment, Youth and the Disabled	Jenista Mhagama MP
	Minister of Agriculture	Hussein Bashe MP
	Minister of Livestock and Fisheries	Abdallah Ulega MP
	Minister of Constitutional Affairs and Justice	Pindi Chana MP
	Minister of Defence and National Service	Stergomena Tax MP
	Minister of Education, Science, Technology and Vocational Training	Adolf Mkenda MP
	Minister of Minerals	Anthony Mavunde MP
	Minister of Finance	Mwigulu Nchemba MP
	Minister of Foreign Affairs, E.A.C., Regional and International Cooperation	January Makamba MP
	Minister of Health, Seniors and Children	Ummy Mwalimu MP
	Minister of Community Development & Gender	Dorothy Gwajima MP
	Minister of Home Affairs	Hamad Masauni MP
	Minister of Industry & Trade	Ashatu Kijaji MP
	Minister of Culture, Artists and Sports	Damas Ndumbaro MP
	Minister of Lands, Housing and Human Settlements	Jerry Silaa MP
	Minister of Natural Resources and Tourism	Angellah Kairuki MP
	Minister of Works	Innocent Bashungwa MP
	Minister of Transport	Makame Mbarawa MP
	Minister of Water and Irrigation	Jumaa Aweso MP
	Minister of News, Communication & ICT	Nape Nnauye MP
Also attending Cabinet meetings (excluding voting rights)
	Attorney General	Eliezer Feleshi

=== Fourth Cabinet Reshuffle ===
In July 2024 Samia Suluhu made a Fourth major reshuffled of the cabinet.

Party key
Chama Cha Mapinduzi

Cabinet of Tanzania: July 2024 – 14 August 2024
Portrait	Portfolio	Incumbent
	President; Commander-in-chief of the Armed Forces	Samia Suluhu
	Vice President	Philip Mpango
	President of Zanzibar (Semi-autonomous region)	Hussein Mwinyi
	Prime Minister	Kassim Majaliwa MP
	Deputy Prime Minister & Minister of Energy	Doto Biteko MP
	Ministers of State in the President’s Office; Regional Administration, Local Government, Public Service, Good Governance, Planning and Investment	George Mkuchika MP
	Ministers of State in the President’s Office; Regional Administration, Local Government, Public Service, Good Governance, Planning and Investment	George Simbachawene MP
	Ministers of State in the President’s Office; Regional Administration, Local Government, Public Service, Good Governance, Planning and Investment	Mohamed Mchengerwa MP
	Ministers of State in the President’s Office; Regional Administration, Local Government, Public Service, Good Governance, Planning and Investment	Kitila Mkumbo
	Minister of State in the Vice President’s Office; Union Affairs and Environment	Ashatu Kijaji MP
	Minister of State in the Prime Minister’s Office; Policy, Parliamentary Affairs, Coordination, Labour, Employment, Youth and the Disabled	Ridhiwani Kikwete MP
	Minister of State in the Prime Minister’s Office; Policy, Parliamentary Affairs, Coordination, Labour, Employment, Youth and the Disabled	Jenista Mhagama MP
	Minister of Agriculture	Hussein Bashe MP
	Minister of Livestock and Fisheries	Abdallah Ulega MP
	Minister of Constitutional Affairs and Justice	Pindi Chana MP
	Minister of Defence and National Service	Stergomena Tax MP
	Minister of Education, Science, Technology and Vocational Training	Adolf Mkenda MP
	Minister of Minerals	Anthony Mavunde MP
	Minister of Finance	Mwigulu Nchemba MP
	Minister of Foreign Affairs, E.A.C., Regional and International Cooperation	Mahmoud Thabit Kombo MP
	Minister of Health, Seniors and Children	Ummy Mwalimu MP
	Minister of Community Development & Gender	Dorothy Gwajima MP
	Minister of Home Affairs	Hamad Masauni MP
	Minister of Industry & Trade	Selemani Jafo MP
	Minister of Culture, Artists and Sports	Damas Ndumbaro MP
	Minister of Lands, Housing and Human Settlements	Deogratius Ndejembi MP
	Minister of Natural Resources and Tourism	Angellah Kairuki MP
	Minister of Works	Innocent Bashungwa MP
	Minister of Transport	Makame Mbarawa MP
	Minister of Water and Irrigation	Jumaa Aweso MP
	Minister of News, Communication & ICT	Jerry Silaa MP
‘’’Also attending Cabinet meetings (excluding voting rights) ‘’’
	Attorney General	Eliezer Feleshi

=== Fifth Cabinet Reshuffle ===
On 14 August 2024 Samia Suluhu made a Fifth major reshuffled of the cabinet.

Party key
Chama Cha Mapinduzi

Cabinet of Tanzania: 14 August 2024 – 8 December 2024
Portrait	Portfolio	Incumbent
	President; Commander-in-chief of the Armed Forces	Samia Suluhu
	Vice President	Philip Mpango
	President of Zanzibar (Semi-autonomous region)	Hussein Mwinyi
	Prime Minister	Kassim Majaliwa MP
	Deputy Prime Minister & Minister of Energy	Doto Biteko MP
	Ministers of State in the President’s Office; Regional Administration, Local Government, Public Service, Good Governance, Planning and Investment	George Mkuchika MP
	Ministers of State in the President’s Office; Regional Administration, Local Government, Public Service, Good Governance, Planning and Investment	George Simbachawene MP
	Ministers of State in the President’s Office; Regional Administration, Local Government, Public Service, Good Governance, Planning and Investment	Mohamed Mchengerwa MP
	Ministers of State in the President’s Office; Regional Administration, Local Government, Public Service, Good Governance, Planning and Investment	Kitila Mkumbo
	Minister of State in the Vice President’s Office; Union Affairs and Environment	Ashatu Kijaji MP
	Minister of State in the Prime Minister’s Office; Policy, Parliamentary Affairs, Coordination, Labour, Employment, Youth and the Disabled	Ridhiwani Kikwete MP
	Minister of State in the Prime Minister’s Office; Policy, Parliamentary Affairs, Coordination, Labour, Employment, Youth and the Disabled	William Lukuvi MP
	Minister of Agriculture	Hussein Bashe MP
	Minister of Livestock and Fisheries	Abdallah Ulega MP
	Minister of Constitutional Affairs and Justice	Palamagamba Kabudi MP
	Minister of Defence and National Service	Stergomena Tax MP
	Minister of Education, Science, Technology and Vocational Training	Adolf Mkenda MP
	Minister of Minerals	Anthony Mavunde MP
	Minister of Finance	Mwigulu Nchemba MP
	Minister of Foreign Affairs, E.A.C., Regional and International Cooperation	Mahmoud Thabit Kombo MP
	Minister of Health, Seniors and Children	Jenista Mhagama MP
	Minister of Community Development & Gender	Dorothy Gwajima MP
	Minister of Home Affairs	Hamad Masauni MP
	Minister of Industry & Trade	Selemani Jafo MP
	Minister of Culture, Artists and Sports	Damas Ndumbaro MP
	Minister of Lands, Housing and Human Settlements	Deogratius Ndejembi MP
	Minister of Natural Resources and Tourism	Pindi Chana MP
	Minister of Works	Innocent Bashungwa MP
	Minister of Transport	Makame Mbarawa MP
	Minister of Water and Irrigation	Jumaa Aweso MP
	Minister of News, Communication & ICT	Jerry Silaa MP
‘’’Also attending Cabinet meetings (excluding voting rights) ‘’’
	Attorney General	Hamza Johari

=== Sixth Cabinet Reshuffle ===
On 08 December 2024 Samia Suluhu made a Sixth major reshuffled of the cabinet.

Party key
Chama Cha Mapinduzi

Cabinet of Tanzania: 8 December 2024 – 13 November 2025
Portrait	Portfolio	Incumbent
	President; Commander-in-chief of the Armed Forces	Samia Suluhu
	Vice President	Philip Mpango
	President of Zanzibar (Semi-autonomous region)	Hussein Mwinyi
	Prime Minister	Kassim Majaliwa MP
	Deputy Prime Minister & Minister of Energy	Doto Biteko MP
	Ministers of State in the President’s Office; Regional Administration, Local Government, Public Service, Good Governance, Planning and Investment	George Mkuchika MP
	Ministers of State in the President’s Office; Regional Administration, Local Government, Public Service, Good Governance, Planning and Investment	George Simbachawene MP
	Ministers of State in the President’s Office; Regional Administration, Local Government, Public Service, Good Governance, Planning and Investment	Mohamed Mchengerwa MP
	Ministers of State in the President’s Office; Regional Administration, Local Government, Public Service, Good Governance, Planning and Investment	Kitila Mkumbo
	Minister of State in the Vice President’s Office; Union Affairs and Environment	Hamad Masauni MP
	Minister of State in the Prime Minister’s Office; Policy, Parliamentary Affairs, Coordination, Labour, Employment, Youth and the Disabled	Ridhiwani Kikwete MP
	Minister of State in the Prime Minister’s Office; Policy, Parliamentary Affairs, Coordination, Labour, Employment, Youth and the Disabled	William Lukuvi MP
	Minister of Agriculture	Hussein Bashe MP
	Minister of Livestock and Fisheries	Ashatu Kijaji MP
	Minister of Constitutional Affairs and Justice	Damas Ndumbaro MP
	Minister of Defence and National Service	Stergomena Tax MP
	Minister of Education, Science, Technology and Vocational Training	Adolf Mkenda MP
	Minister of Minerals	Anthony Mavunde MP
	Minister of Finance	Mwigulu Nchemba MP
	Minister of Foreign Affairs, E.A.C., Regional and International Cooperation	Mahmoud Thabit Kombo MP
	Minister of Health, Seniors and Children	Jenista Mhagama MP
	Minister of Community Development & Gender	Dorothy Gwajima MP
	Minister of Home Affairs	Innocent Bashungwa MP
	Minister of Industry & Trade	Selemani Jafo MP
	Minister of Information, Culture, Artists and Sports	Palamagamba Kabudi MP
	Minister of Lands, Housing and Human Settlements	Deogratius Ndejembi MP
	Minister of Natural Resources and Tourism	Pindi Chana MP
	Minister of Works	Abdallah Ulega MP
	Minister of Transport	Makame Mbarawa MP
	Minister of Water and Irrigation	Jumaa Aweso MP
	Minister of Communication & ICT	Jerry Silaa MP
‘’’Also attending Cabinet meetings (excluding voting rights) ‘’’
	Attorney General	Hamza Johari

== Second Term ==
=== Inaugural Cabinet ===
After October 29, 2025 election, Samia Suluhu sworn into office after claiming victory for almost 98% of the votes. On 17 November 2025 she announces her second term ministerial cabinet left out many of previous ministers

Party key
Chama Cha Mapinduzi

Cabinet of Tanzania: 17 November 2025 – 8 January 2026
Portrait	Portfolio	Incumbent
	President; Commander-in-chief of the Armed Forces	Samia Suluhu
	Vice President	Emmanuel Nchimbi
	President of Zanzibar (Semi-autonomous region)	Hussein Mwinyi
	Prime Minister	Mwigulu Nchemba MP
	Ministers of State in the President’s Office; Public Service, Good Governance, Planning, Investment and Youth Development	Ridhiwani Kikwete MP
	Ministers of State in the President’s Office; Public Service, Good Governance, Planning, Investment and Youth Development	Kitila Mkumbo
	Ministers of State in the President’s Office; Public Service, Good Governance, Planning, Investment and Youth Development	Joel Nanauka
	Minister of State in the Vice President’s Office; Union Affairs and Environment	Festo Ndugange MP
	Minister of State in the Prime Minister’s Office; Policy, Parliamentary Affairs, Coordination, the Disabled, Labour, Employment, Relationship, Regional Governance, and Local Governance	William Lukuvi MP
	Minister of State in the Prime Minister’s Office; Policy, Parliamentary Affairs, Coordination, the Disabled, Labour, Employment, Relationship, Regional Governance, and Local Governance	Deus Sangu MP
	Minister of State in the Prime Minister’s Office; Policy, Parliamentary Affairs, Coordination, the Disabled, Labour, Employment, Relationship, Regional Governance, and Local Governance	Riziki ShemdoeMP
	Minister of Agriculture	Daniel Chingolo MP
	Minister of Livestock and Fisheries	Bashiru Ally MP
	Minister of Constitutional Affairs and Justice	Juma Homera MP
	Minister of Defence and National Service	Rhimo Nyansaho MP
	Minister of Education, Science and Technology	Adolf Mkenda MP
	Minister of Energy	Deogratius NdejembiMP
	Minister of Minerals	Anthony Mavunde MP
	Minister of Finance	Khamis Omar MP
	Minister of Foreign Affairs, E.A.C., Regional and International Cooperation	Mahmoud Thabit Kombo MP
	Minister of Health	Mohamed Mchengerwa MP
	Minister of Community Development & Gender	Dorothy Gwajima MP
	Minister of Home Affairs	George Simbachawene MP
	Minister of Industry & Trade	Judith Kapinga MP
	Minister of Information, Culture, Artists and Sports	Palamagamba Kabudi MP
	Minister of Lands, Housing and Human Settlements	Leonard Akwilapo MP
	Minister of Natural Resources and Tourism	Ashatu Kijaji MP
	Minister of Works	Abdallah Ulega MP
	Minister of Transport	Makame Mbarawa MP
	Minister of Water and Irrigation	Jumaa Aweso MP
	Minister of Communication & ICT	Angellah Kairuki MP
‘’’Also attending Cabinet meetings (excluding voting rights) ‘’’
	Attorney General	Hamza Johari

=== First Cabinet Reshuffle ===
Party key
Chama Cha Mapinduzi

Cabinet of Tanzania: 8 January 2026 – 2 April 2026
Portrait	Portfolio	Incumbent
	President; Commander-in-chief of the Armed Forces	Samia Suluhu
	Vice President	Emmanuel Nchimbi
	President of Zanzibar (Semi-autonomous region)	Hussein Mwinyi
	Prime Minister	Mwigulu Nchemba MP
	Ministers of State in the President’s Office; Public Service, Good Governance, Planning, Investment, Youth Development, Special task force	Ridhiwani Kikwete MP
	Ministers of State in the President’s Office; Public Service, Good Governance, Planning, Investment, Youth Development, Special task force	Kitila Mkumbo
	Ministers of State in the President’s Office; Public Service, Good Governance, Planning, Investment, Youth Development, Special task force	Joel Nanauka
	Ministers of State in the President’s Office; Public Service, Good Governance, Planning, Investment, Youth Development, Special task force	Palamagamba Kabudi
	Minister of State in the Vice President’s Office; Union Affairs and Environment	Festo Ndugange MP
	Minister of State in the Prime Minister’s Office; Policy, Parliamentary Affairs, Coordination, the Disabled, Labour, Employment, Relationship, Regional Governance, and Local Governance	William Lukuvi MP
	Minister of State in the Prime Minister’s Office; Policy, Parliamentary Affairs, Coordination, the Disabled, Labour, Employment, Relationship, Regional Governance, and Local Governance	Deus Sangu MP
	Minister of State in the Prime Minister’s Office; Policy, Parliamentary Affairs, Coordination, the Disabled, Labour, Employment, Relationship, Regional Governance, and Local Governance	Riziki ShemdoeMP
	Minister of Agriculture	Daniel Chingolo MP
	Minister of Livestock and Fisheries	Bashiru Ally MP
	Minister of Constitutional Affairs and Justice	Juma Homera MP
	Minister of Defence and National Service	Rhimo Nyansaho MP
	Minister of Education, Science and Technology	Adolf Mkenda MP
	Minister of Energy	Deogratius NdejembiMP
	Minister of Minerals	Anthony Mavunde MP
	Minister of Finance	Khamis Omar MP
	Minister of Foreign Affairs	Mahmoud Thabit Kombo MP
	Minister of Health	Mohamed Mchengerwa MP
	Minister of Community Development & Gender	Dorothy Gwajima MP
	Minister of Home Affairs	Patrobas Katambi MP
	Minister of Industry & Trade	Judith Kapinga MP
	Minister of Information, Culture, Artists and Sports	Paul Makonda MP
	Minister of Lands, Housing and Human Settlements	Leonard Akwilapo MP
	Minister of Natural Resources and Tourism	Ashatu Kijaji MP
	Minister of Works	Abdallah Ulega MP
	Minister of Transport	Makame Mbarawa MP
	Minister of Water	Jumaa Aweso MP
	Minister of Communication & ICT	Angellah Kairuki MP
‘’’Also attending Cabinet meetings (excluding voting rights) ‘’’
	Attorney General	Hamza Johari

=== Second Cabinet Reshuffle ===
Following the death of Minister of State in the Prime Minister's Office William Lukuvi who was responsible for policy, Parliamentary affairs, Coordination and the disabled on 25 March 2026, the President made changes to its cabinet to fill the gap on 2 April 2025.

Party key
Chama Cha Mapinduzi

Cabinet of Tanzania: 2 April 2026 – 29 August 2026
Portrait	Portfolio	Incumbent
	President; Commander-in-chief of the Armed Forces	Samia Suluhu
	Vice President	Emmanuel Nchimbi
	President of Zanzibar (Semi-autonomous region)	Hussein Mwinyi
	Prime Minister	Mwigulu Nchemba MP
	Ministers of State in the President’s Office; Public Service, Good Governance, Planning, Investment, Youth Development	Ridhiwani Kikwete MP
	Ministers of State in the President’s Office; Public Service, Good Governance, Planning, Investment, Youth Development	Kitila Mkumbo
	Ministers of State in the President’s Office; Public Service, Good Governance, Planning, Investment, Youth Development	Joel Nanauka
Minister of State in the Vice President’s Office; Union Affairs and Environment	Ministers of State in the President’s Office; Public Service, Good Governance, Planning, Investment, Youth Development	Festo Ndugange MP
	Minister of State in the Prime Minister’s Office; Policy, Parliamentary Affairs, Coordination, the Disabled, Labour, Employment, Relationship, Regional Governance, and Local Governance	Palamagamba Kabudi MP
	Minister of State in the Prime Minister’s Office; Policy, Parliamentary Affairs, Coordination, the Disabled, Labour, Employment, Relationship, Regional Governance, and Local Governance	Deus Sangu MP
	Minister of State in the Prime Minister’s Office; Policy, Parliamentary Affairs, Coordination, the Disabled, Labour, Employment, Relationship, Regional Governance, and Local Governance	Riziki ShemdoeMP
	Minister of Agriculture	Daniel Chingolo MP
	Minister of Livestock and Fisheries	Bashiru Ally MP
	Minister of Constitutional Affairs and Justice	Juma Homera MP
	Minister of Defence and National Service	Rhimo Nyansaho MP
	Minister of Education, Science and Technology	Adolf Mkenda MP
	Minister of Energy	Deogratius NdejembiMP
	Minister of Minerals	Anthony Mavunde MP
	Minister of Finance	Khamis Omar MP
	Minister of Foreign Affairs	Mahmoud Thabit Kombo MP
	Minister of Health	Mohamed Mchengerwa MP
	Minister of Community Development & Gender	Dorothy Gwajima MP
	Minister of Home Affairs	Patrobas Katambi MP
	Minister of Industry & Trade	Judith Kapinga MP
	Minister of Information, Culture, Artists and Sports	Paul Makonda MP
	Minister of Lands, Housing and Human Settlements	Leonard Akwilapo MP
	Minister of Natural Resources and Tourism	Ashatu Kijaji MP
	Minister of Works	Abdallah Ulega MP
	Minister of Transport	Makame Mbarawa MP
	Minister of Water	Jumaa Aweso MP
	Minister of Communication & ICT	Angellah Kairuki MP
‘’’Also attending Cabinet meetings (excluding voting rights) ‘’’
	Attorney General	Hamza Johari

=== Third Cabinet Reshuffle ===
On 25 August 2026, the Vice President Emmanuel Nchimbi wrote a letter to the president informing her of his intention to resign from the position.

Party key
Chama Cha Mapinduzi

Cabinet of Tanzania: 29 August 2026 – 27 September 2026
Portrait	Portfolio	Incumbent
	President; Commander-in-chief of the Armed Forces	Samia Suluhu
	Vice President	Deogratius Ndejembi
	President of Zanzibar (Semi-autonomous region)	Hussein Mwinyi
	Prime Minister	Mwigulu Nchemba MP
	Ministers of State in the President’s Office; Public Service, Good Governance, Planning, Investment, Youth Development	Ridhiwani Kikwete MP
	Ministers of State in the President’s Office; Public Service, Good Governance, Planning, Investment, Youth Development	Kitila Mkumbo
	Ministers of State in the President’s Office; Public Service, Good Governance, Planning, Investment, Youth Development	Joel Nanauka
Minister of State in the Vice President’s Office; Union Affairs and Environment	Ministers of State in the President’s Office; Public Service, Good Governance, Planning, Investment, Youth Development	Festo Ndugange MP
	Minister of State in the Prime Minister’s Office; Policy, Parliamentary Affairs, Coordination, the Disabled, Labour, Employment, Relationship, Regional Governance, and Local Governance	Palamagamba Kabudi MP
	Minister of State in the Prime Minister’s Office; Policy, Parliamentary Affairs, Coordination, the Disabled, Labour, Employment, Relationship, Regional Governance, and Local Governance	Deus Sangu MP
	Minister of State in the Prime Minister’s Office; Policy, Parliamentary Affairs, Coordination, the Disabled, Labour, Employment, Relationship, Regional Governance, and Local Governance	Riziki ShemdoeMP
	Minister of Agriculture	Daniel Chingolo MP
	Minister of Livestock and Fisheries	Bashiru Ally MP
	Minister of Constitutional Affairs and Justice	Juma Homera MP
	Minister of Defence and National Service	Rhimo Nyansaho MP
	Minister of Education, Science and Technology	Adolf Mkenda MP
	Minister of Energy	
	Minister of Minerals	Anthony Mavunde MP
	Minister of Finance	Khamis Omar MP
	Minister of Foreign Affairs	Mahmoud Thabit Kombo MP
	Minister of Health	Mohamed Mchengerwa MP
	Minister of Community Development & Gender	Dorothy Gwajima MP
	Minister of Home Affairs	Patrobas Katambi MP
	Minister of Industry & Trade	Judith Kapinga MP
	Minister of Information, Culture, Artists and Sports	Paul Makonda MP
	Minister of Lands, Housing and Human Settlements	Leonard Akwilapo MP
	Minister of Natural Resources and Tourism	Ashatu Kijaji MP
	Minister of Works	Abdallah Ulega MP
	Minister of Transport	Makame Mbarawa MP
	Minister of Water	Jumaa Aweso MP
	Minister of Communication & ICT	Angellah Kairuki MP
‘’’Also attending Cabinet meetings (excluding voting rights) ‘’’
	Attorney General	Hamza Johari

=== Current cabinet ===
Cabinet of Samia Suluhu Hassan 27 September 2026–present
Incumbent	Office(s)	Took office
Samia Suluhu Hassan	President; Commander-in-chief of the Armed Forces	19 March 2021 (5 years ago)
Deogratius Ndejembi	Vice-President of Tanzania	29 August 2026 (37 days ago)
Hussein Mwinyi	President of Zanzibar (Semi-autonomous region)	3 November 2020 (5 years ago)
Mwigulu Nchemba	Prime Minister	13 November 2025 (10 months ago)
Juma Homera	Minister of Energy	27 September 2026 (8 days ago)
Daniel Chingolo	Minister of Agriculture	17 November 2025 (10 months ago)
Dorothy Gwajima	Minister of Community Development & Gender	10 January 2022 (4 years ago)
Abdallah Ulega	Minister of Constitutional and Legal Affairs	27 September 2026 (8 days ago)
Paul Makonda	Minister for Information, Culture, Arts, and Sports	8 January 2026 (8 months ago)
Rhimo Nyansaho	Minister of Defence and National Service	17 November 2025 (10 months ago)
Adolf Mkenda	Minister for Education, Science and Technology	10 January 2022 (4 years ago)
Khamis Omar	Minister of Finance	17 November 2025 (10 months ago)
Mahmoud Thabit Kombo	Minister of Foreign Affairs	26 July 2024 (2 years ago)
Mohamed Mchengerwa	Minister of Health	17 November 2025 (10 months ago)
Patrobas Katambi	Minister of Home Affairs	8 January 2026 (8 months ago)
Judith Kapinga	Minister for Industry and Trade	17 November 2025 (10 months ago)
Angellah Kairuki	Minister for Communications Technology	17 November 2025 (10 months ago)
Leonard Akwilapo	Minister for Lands, Housing, and Human Settlements Development	17 November 2025 (10 months ago)
Bashiru Ally	Minister of Livestock and Fisheries	17 November 2025 (10 months ago)
Anthony Mavunde	Minister of Minerals	1 September 2023 (3 years ago)
Ashatu Kijaji	Minister of Natural Resources and Tourism	17 November 2025 (10 months ago)
Makame Mbarawa	Minister of Transport	1 September 2023 (3 years ago)
Jumaa Aweso	Minister of Water	5 December 2020 (5 years ago)
Masanja Kadogosa	Minister of Works	27 September 2026 (8 days ago)
Minister of State in the President's Office
Kitila Mkumbo	Planning and Investment	14 July 2023 (3 years ago)
Ridhiwani Kikwete	Public Service Management and Good Governance	17 November 2025 (10 months ago)
Joel Nanauka	Youth Development	17 November 2025 (10 months ago)
Minister of State in the Vice-President's Office
Festo Ndugange	Union Affairs and Environment	17 November 2025 (10 months ago)
Minister of State in the Prime Minister's Office
Deus Sangu	Labour, Youth, Employment & Relations	17 November 2025 (10 months ago)
Palamagamba Kabudi	Policy, Parliamentary Affairs & Coordination & Persons with Disability	2 April 2026 (6 months ago)
Riziki Shemdoe	Regional Administration & Local Governance	17 November 2025 (10 months ago)
Also attending Cabinet meetings (excluding voting rights)
Hamza Johari	Attorney General	14 August 2024 (2 years ago)
