= Cabinet of Tanzania =

National executive branch group

The Cabinet of Tanzania is the most senior level of the executive branch of Tanzania and consists of the President, Vice President, President of Zanzibar, Prime Minister and all the Ministers. Deputy Ministers are not part of the cabinet.

== Current Cabinet ==
Cabinet of Samia Suluhu Hassan July 2024–present
| Incumbent | Office(s) | Took office |
| Samia Suluhu Hassan | President; Commander-in-chief of the Armed Forces | 19 March 2021 (3 years ago) |
| Philip Mpango | Vice-President of Tanzania | 31 March 2021 (3 years ago) |
| Hussein Mwinyi | President of Zanzibar (Semi-autonomous region) | 3 November 2020 (4 years ago) |
| Kassim Majaliwa | Prime Minister | 20 November 2015 (9 years ago) |
| Doto Biteko | Deputy Prime Minister; Minister of Energy | 1 September 2023 (18 months ago) |
| Hussein Bashe | Minister of Agriculture | 10 January 2022 (3 years ago) |
| Dorothy Gwajima | Minister of Community Development & Gender | 10 January 2022 (3 years ago) |
| Pindi Chana | Minister of Constitutional and Legal Affairs | 1 September 2023 (18 months ago) |
| Damas Ndumbaro | Minister for Culture, Arts, and Sports | 1 September 2023 (18 months ago) |
| Stergomena Tax | Minister of Defence and National Service | 1 September 2023 (18 months ago) |
| Adolf Mkenda | Minister for Education, Science and Technology | 10 January 2022 (3 years ago) |
| Mwigulu Nchemba | Minister of Finance | 31 March 2021 (3 years ago) |
| Mahmoud Thabit Kombo | Minister of Foreign Affairs | 26 July 2024 (7 months ago) |
| Ummy Mwalimu | Minister of Health | 10 January 2022 (3 years ago) |
| Hamad Masauni | Minister of Home Affairs | 10 January 2022 (3 years ago) |
| Selemani Jafo | Minister for Industry and Trade | 5 July 2024 (8 months ago) |
| Jerry Silaa | Minister for Information and Communications Technology | 26 July 2024 (7 months ago) |
| Deogratius Ndejembi | Minister for Lands, Housing, and Human Settlements Development | 26 July 2024 (7 months ago) |
| Abdallah Ulega | Minister of Livestock and Fisheries | 27 February 2023 (2 years ago) |
| Anthony Mavunde | Minister of Minerals | 1 September 2023 (18 months ago) |
| Angellah Kairuki | Minister of Natural Resources and Tourism | 1 September 2023 (18 months ago) |
| Makame Mbarawa | Minister of Transport | 1 September 2023 (18 months ago) |
| Jumaa Aweso | Minister of Water | 5 December 2020 (4 years ago) |
| Innocent Bashungwa | Minister of Works | 1 September 2023 (18 months ago) |
Minister of State in the President's Office
| Mohamed Mchengerwa | Regional Administration and Local Government (TATISEMI) | |
| Kitila Mkumbo | Planning and Investment | 14 July 2023 (20 months ago) |
| George Simbachawene | Public Service Management and Good Governance | |
| George Mkuchika | Minister without portfolio | |
Minister of State in the Vice-President's Office
| Ashatu Kijaji | Union Affairs and Environment | 5 July 2024 (8 months ago) |
Minister of State in the Prime Minister's Office
| Ridhiwani Kikwete | Labour, Youth, Employment & Persons with Disability | 26 July 2024 (7 months ago) |
| Jenista Mhagama | Policy, Parliamentary Affairs & Coordination | |
Also attending Cabinet meetings (excluding voting rights)
| Eliezer Feleshi | Attorney General | 13 September 2021 (3 years ago) |

== Previous cabinets ==
- Magufuli cabinet
- Kikwete Cabinet

== See also ==
- Deputy Ministers of Tanzania
