= Cabinets in Tanzania =

The Cabinet of Tanzania is the most senior level of the executive branch of Tanzania and consists of President, Vice President, Prime Minister, President of Zanzibar and all the Ministers. For the composition of the current Cabinet see Cabinet of Tanzania

== 2015 - 2021 Cabinet ==
The Cabinet of Tanzania in 2015.

Portfolio	Incumbent	Since
President	John Pombe Magufuli	2015
Vice President	Samia Hassan Suluhu	2015
President of Zanzibar	Ali Mohamed Shein	2015
Prime Minister	Kassim Majaliwa	2015
Ministers of State in the President's Office; Regional Administration, Local Government, Civil Service and Good Governance	Selemani Jafo	2017
Minister of State in the Vice President's Office; Union Affairs and Environment	January Makamba	2015
Minister of State in the Prime Minister's Office; Policy, Parliamentary Affairs, Labour, Employment, Youth and the Disabled	Jenista Mhagama	2015
Minister of Finance	Philip Mpango	2015
Ministry for Health, Community Development, Gender, the Elderly, and Children Ummy Ally Mwalim Ministry for Home Affairs	Mwigulu Nchemba	2015
Minister of Constitutional Affairs and Justice	Palamagamba John Aidan Mwaluko Kabudi	2017
Ministry for Foreign Affairs, International Cooperation, and Regional Integration	Augustine Phillip Mahiga	2015
Minister of Defence and National Service	Hussein Ali Mwinyi	2015
Minister of Water and Irrigation	Gerson Lwenge	2015
Minister of Education, Science, Technology and Vocational Training	Joyce Ndalichako	2015
Minister of Lands, Housing and Urban Development	William Lukuvi	2015
Minister of Natural Resources and Tourism	Hamisi Kigwangalla	2017
Minister of Energy	Medard Kalemani	2017
Ministry of Works (Tanzania)|Minister of Works	Makame Mbarawa	2015
Minister of Industry, Trade and Investment	Charles Mwijage	2015
Minister of Information, Culture, Arts and Sports	Harrison Mwakyembe	2017
Minister of Health	Ummy Mwalimu	2016
Minister of Minerals	Angellah Kairuki	2016
Minister of Livestock and Fisheries	Luhaga Mpina	2016
Minister of Agriculture	Charles Tizeba	2017

== See also ==
- Politics of Tanzania
