= Emmanuel Nchimbi =

12th Vice President of Tanzania

His Excellency Emmanuel Nchimbi
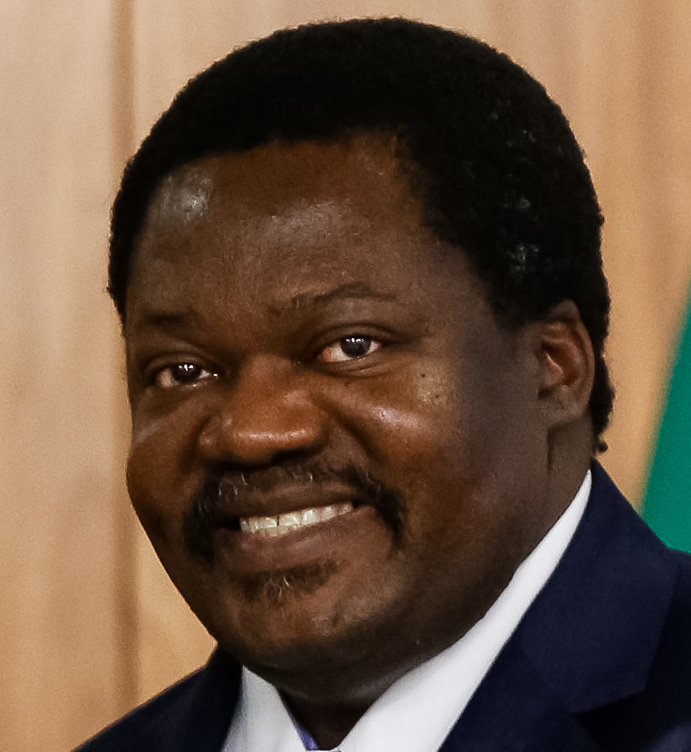
- Nchimbi in 2017

Vice-President of Tanzania
- In office 3 November 2025 – 9 September 2026
- President: Samia Suluhu Hassan
- Preceded by: Philip Mpango
- Succeeded by: Deogratius Ndejembi

Ambassador of the United Republic of Tanzania in Cairo, Egypt
- In office 2022 – August 2023
- Preceded by: Maj. Gen. (Ret) Anselm Shigongo Bahati

Ambassador of the United Republic of Tanzania in Brasilia, Brazil
- In office 2016–2021
- Preceded by: Francis A. Malambugi
- Succeeded by: Adelardus Kilangi

20th Minister of Home Affairs
- In office 7 May 2012 – 20 December 2013
- Preceded by: Shamsi Nahodha
- Succeeded by: Mathias Chikawe

Minister of Information, Culture, Sports and Youths
- In office 28 November 2010 – 7 May 2012
- President: Jakaya Kikwete

Deputy Minister of Defence and National Service
- In office 13 February 2008 – 28 November 2010
- Minister: Hussein Mwinyi

Deputy Minister of Labour, Employment and Youth Development
- In office 17 October 2006 – 13 February 2008

Deputy Minister of Information, Culture and Sports
- In office 6 January 2006 – 16 October 2006

Member of Parliament for Songea Town
- In office 2005–2015
- Preceded by: Lawrence Gama
- Succeeded by: Leonidas Gama

Personal details
- Born: Emmanuel John Nchimbi; 24 December 1971 (age 54) Mbeya, Mbeya Region, Tanzania
- Party: CCM
- Education: Mzumbe University (MBA)

Emmanuel John Nchimbi (born 24 December 1971) is a Tanzanian diplomat and politician who served as the Vice-President of the United Republic of Tanzania from November 2025 until his resignation in August 2026. He previously served as the Minister of Home Affairs between 2012 and 2013 and as Member of Parliament for Songea Town constituency from 2010 to 2015. On 25 August 2026, he announced that he had submitted his resignation as Vice-President to President Samia Suluhu Hassan, with effect from 4 September 2026, saying that he intended to retire from politics and public service.

== Background and education ==
Nchimbi went to Uru and Sangu Secondary Schools after which he proceeded to an advanced education at Forest Hill Secondary School in Mbeya. After graduating from Mzumbe University where he studied diploma in public administration, he pursued a master's degree in banking and finance, and eventually a doctorate.

== Political career ==
Nchimbi became the chair of the CCM's youth wing after joining the National Executive Committee in 1997. Prior to earning a position in the Songea Urban Assembly, he was the Bunda District Commissioner from 2003 to 2005. He then served in the Cabinet in a number of capacities, including those of Home Affairs, Labor, and Information. In the year 2015 to 2023, he represented Tanzania as ambassador to Egypt and then Brazil before he returned to party politics. He was named Secretary-General of the CCM in January 2024.

In 2025, he unveiled plans to strengthen the mining sector to serve East and Central Africa. He also pledged to review and introduce policies and laws to protect Tanzanian miners.

=== Resignation ===
On 25 August 2026, less than ten months after taking office, Nchimbi wrote to President Samia Suluhu Hassan resigning as Vice-President, with effect on 4 September 2026. In a statement issued in Dodoma, he said he had become convinced that the President wanted a change and was therefore honouring a pledge he had made in August 2025 to step aside whenever she wanted a new deputy, adding that he intended to retire from politics and public service altogether. He cited Article 50(2)(c) read together with Article 149(2) of the Constitution of Tanzania as the basis for the resignation. On 26 August, Nchimbi was expelled from the CCM for indiscipline.
