= Palamagamba John Aidan Mwaluko Kabudi =

Tanzanian lawyer and politician (born 1956)

Honourable Palamagamba Kabudi MP
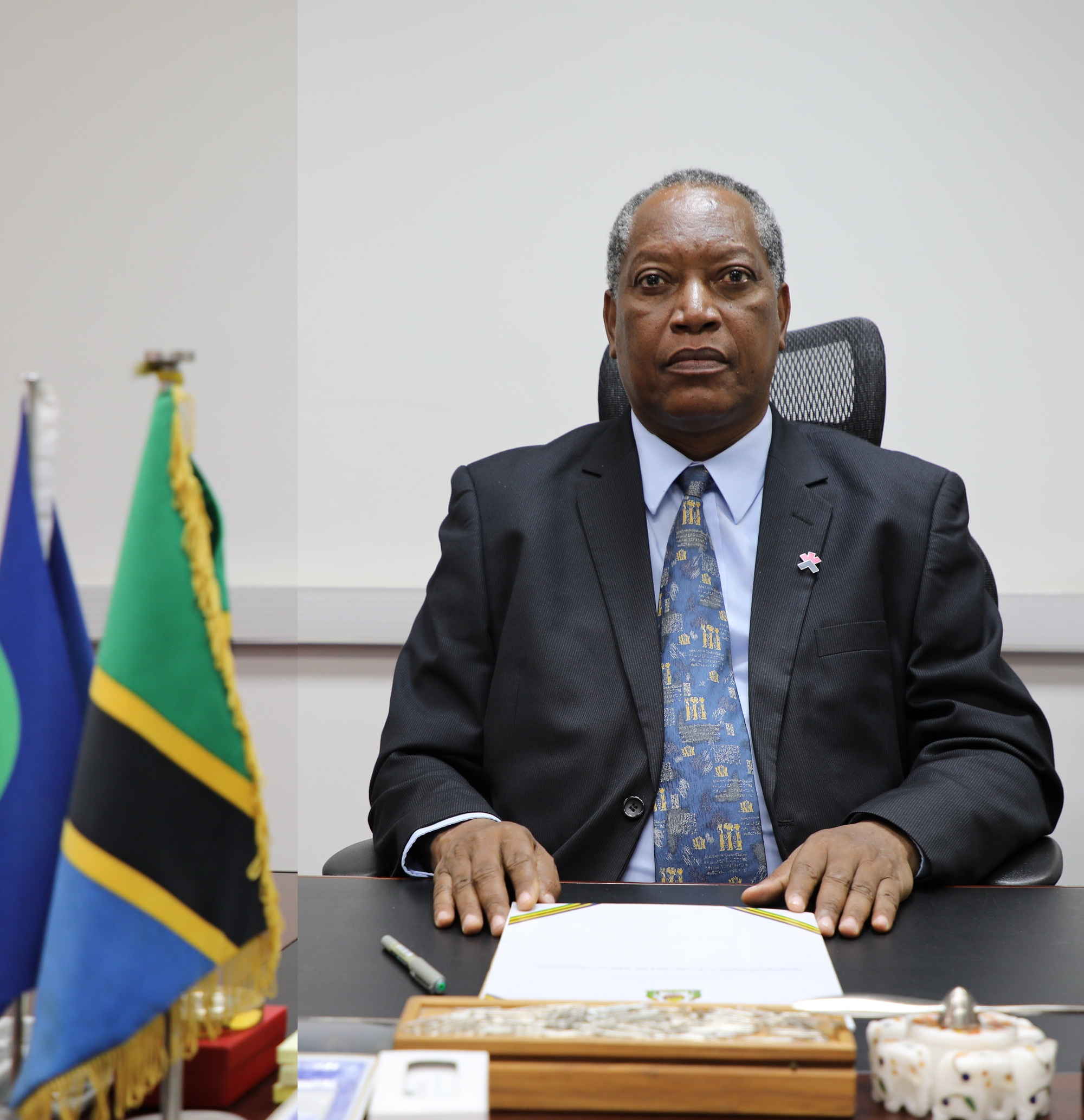

Ministry of Information, Culture, Arts and Sports
- Incumbent
- Assumed office 8 December 2024
- Preceded by: Dr. Damas Daniel Ndumbaro

Minister of Constitutional and Legal Affairs
- In office 7 October 2017 – 3 March 2019
- Preceded by: Harrison Mwakyembe
- Succeeded by: Augustine Mahiga
- In office 31 March 2021 – 8 January 2022
- Preceded by: Mwigulu Nchemba
- Succeeded by: George Simbachawene

15th Minister of Foreign Affairs and East African Cooperation
- In office 3 March 2019 – 31 March 2021
- President: John Magufuli
- Preceded by: Augustine Mahiga
- Succeeded by: Liberata Mulamula

Tanzania Member of Parliament
- Incumbent
- Assumed office 2015
- Appointed by: John Magufuli
- Constituency: None (Nominated MP) 2015-2020; Kilosa 2020-present

Personal details
- Born: Palamagamba John Aidan Mwaluko Kabudi; February 24, 1956 (age 70) Singida, Singida Region, Tanganyika Territory
- Education: Freie Universität Berlin (JD); University of Dar es Salaam (LLM); University of Dar es Salaam (LLB)

Palamagamba John Aidan Mwaluko Kabudi (born February 24, 1956) is a Tanzanian lawyer who from April 2021 to January 2022 served as the country's Minister for Constitution and Legal Affairs, appointed by President Samia Suluhu. He was a Minister for Foreign Affairs and East African Cooperation appointed by President John Pombe Magufuli since 2020 to 2021.

== Early life and education ==
Kabudi was born in Singida, Singida Region. He first attended Kilimatinde Primary school in 1964 then from 1965 to the end of 1966 he went to Kitete Primary school. In 1967 he finally transferred to Berega Primary School before completing his CPEE at Mvumi Mission Primary School. In 1971 he joined The Tosamaganga Secondary School where he earned CSEE of Ordinary level education. From 1975 to 1976 he completed his ACSEE education at Milambo Secondary School.

Kabudi went to the University of Dar Es Salaam from 1980 to 1983 where he obtained his LLB. He furthered his studies in the same institution from 1984 to 1986 where he was awarded LLM. After that he attended Freie Universität Berlin where he obtained a Juris Doctor.

== Political career ==
Professor Kabudi got his first cabinet position in the first Magufuli cabinet as the Minister of Justice and constitutional affairs. Following the death of Foreign minister Augustine Mahiga, Kabudi took over the post as the 15th Minister of Foreign Affairs in 2019. He continued to hold this post through the new Suluhu Cabinet in 2021. Following the second major reshuffle of the cabinet in January 2022, Kabudi was released from a cabinet position and was granted a special advisory role in the President's office.

== Minister for Foreign Affairs and East African Cooperation ==
In 2019, Kabudi summoned Canada's High Commissioner Pamela O'Donnell to protest after a DHC Dash 8-400 turboprop, set to be delivered to state-owned Air Tanzania was impounded in a land compensation dispute.
