= Masaika =

Ward in Pangani, Tanga, Tanzania

Masaika Kata ya Masaika
- Ward
- Location within Tanzania
- Coordinates: 5.27649646°S 38.847955°E
- Country: Tanzania
- Region: Tanga Region
- District: Pangani District
- Ward: Masaika

Government
  - MP: Jumaa Hamidu Aweso

Population (2016)
  - Total: 2,080
- Time zone: UTC+3 (EAT)

Masaika is an administrative ward in the Pangani Division of the Pangani District within the Tanga Region of Tanzania. In 2016 the Tanzania National Bureau of Statistics report there were 2,080 people in the ward.
