= Department of Taxes and Attorney General's Chambers Building =

Coordinates: 24°39′18″S 25°54′31″E

- Location within Botswana
- Alternative names: Attorney General's Chambers Building

General information
- Status: Completed
- Type: Office building
- Architectural style: Futurism
- Location: Nelson Mandela Drive, Gaborone, Botswana
- Current tenants: Botswana Department of Taxes, Attorney General's Chambers
- Construction started: 1999
- Completed: 2007 (Note: Sources give differing completion dates. The Fitzwilliam (2012) page says the building was completed in March 2002 while the Sunday Standard (2007) article shows that the building was still under construction in 2007.)
- Cost: 42 million United States dollars
- Owner: Botswana government

Height
- Height: 176.77 ft (53.88 m)

Technical details
- Structural system: Curtain wall, made of concrete
- Floor count: 15
- Floor area: 38,000 square metres (410,000 sq ft)

Design and construction
- Architecture firm: Pramod Patel Architects
- Other designers: The Fitzwilliam Partnership Botswana

The Department of Taxes and Attorney General's Chambers Building (sometimes shortened to Attorney General's Chambers Building) is one of the most expensive buildings built in Africa. The building, located in the Government Enclave on Nelson Mandela Drive in Gaborone, is home to the Botswana Department of Taxes and the Attorney General's Chambers.

== History ==
Miscommunication and financial mismanagement caused construction of the building to grossly exceed both the deadline and budget. The part of the building originally for the Attorney General's Chambers was assigned to three other departments (i.e. the Ministry of Commerce and Industry; the Ministry of Works, Transport and Communications; and the Department of Architecture and Building Services) before being assigned to the Attorney General once again. Lesego Motsumi, Minister of Works and Transport, reported that "the project had a time delay of 544 days which resulted in an additional cost of P11,734,464.27" (US$1.9 million in July 2007).

== Architecture ==
The building's design has been criticised for its glass windows, which can cause high energy costs in a hot climate.
