= Liberata Mulamula =

Tanzanian politician and diplomat

Honorable Liberata Mulamula MP
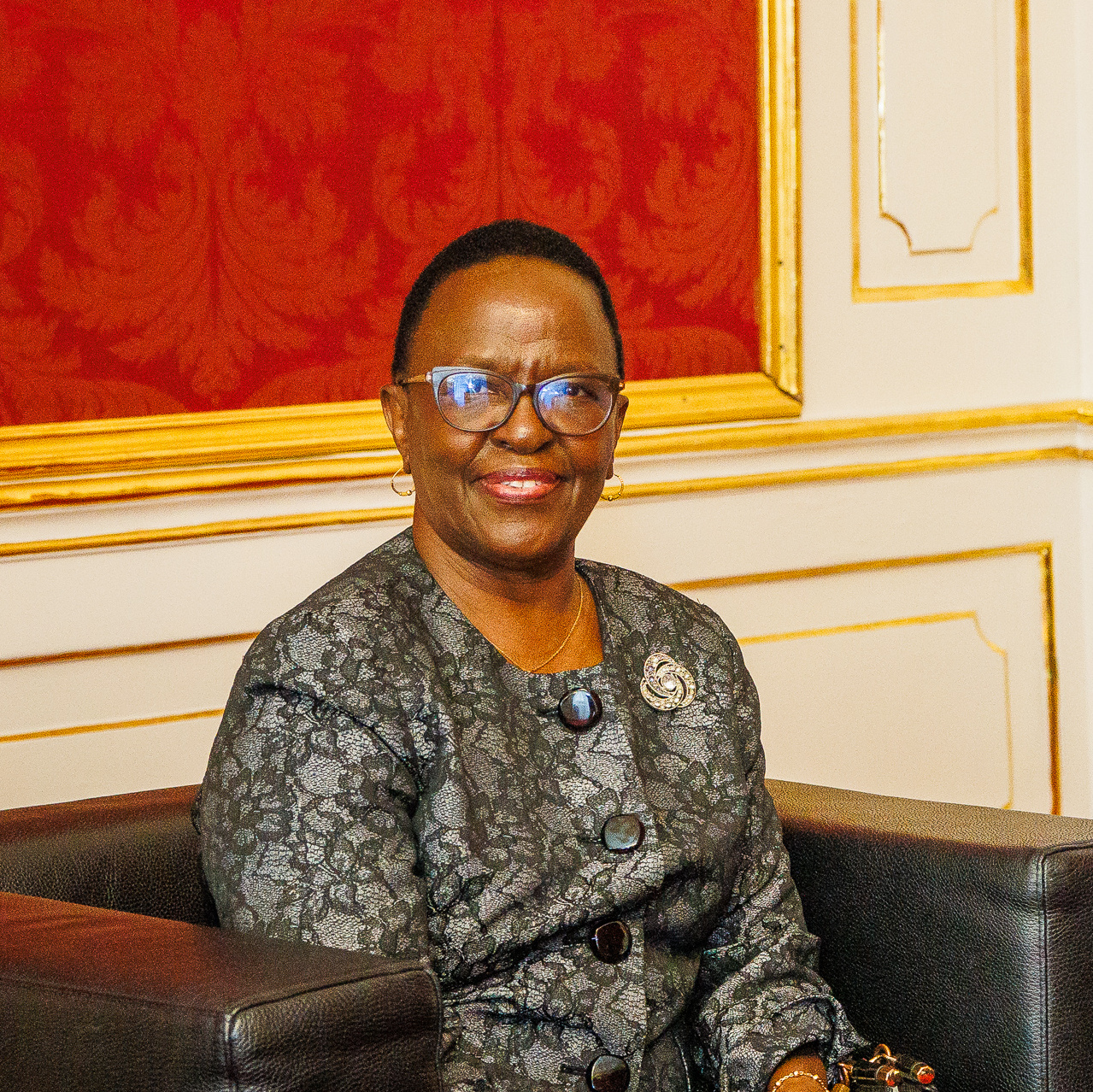
- in 2025

Minister of Foreign Affairs and East African Cooperation
- In office 31 March 2021 – 3 October 2022
- President: Samia Suluhu
- Preceded by: Palamagamba Kabudi
- Succeeded by: Stergomena Tax

Tanzanian Ambassador to the U.S.
- In office 18 July 2013 – 27 May 2015
- President: Jakaya Kikwete
- Preceded by: Mwanaidi Maajar

Senior Advisor to the President (Diplomatic Affairs)
- In office 28 February 2012 – 2013
- President: Jakaya Kikwete

1st Executive Secretary of ICGLR
- In office December 2006 – 15 December 2011
- Succeeded by: Ntumba Luaba

Tanzanian High Commissioner to Canada
- In office 1999–2002
- President: Benjamin Mkapa

Member of Parliament
- Incumbent
- Assumed office 1 April 2021
- Appointed by: Samia Suluhu
- Constituency: None (Nominated MP)

Personal details
- Born: 10 April 1956 (age 70) Kagera Region, Tanganyika Territory
- Party: Chama Cha Mapinduzi
- Spouse: George Mulamula
- Children: 2
- Education: St. John's University (MA); Dar es Salaam University (BA)

Liberata Mulamula, (née Rutageruka (born 10 April 1956) is a Tanzanian diplomat and politician who served as Minister for Foreign Affairs and East African Cooperation from April 2021 to October 2022. She was appointed by President Samia Suluhu, on 31 March 2021 and was sworn into office on 1 April 2021.

Ambassador Mulamula has more than 35 years history as a diplomat and administrator in the Tanzanian Ministry of Foreign Affairs and Regional Cooperation, including as Tanzania's ambassador to the United Nations in New York City, Canada and the United States of America.

Before her retirement from the diplomatic service in April 2016, she served as the Permanent Secretary at the Ministry Foreign Affairs and East African Cooperation, for a period of seven months, between May 2015 until December 2015.

She also served as the first Executive Secretary of the International Conference on the Great Lakes Region (ICGLR), based in Bujumbura, Burundi, from 2006 until 2011. In this role, she oversaw Peace, Stability and Development in 11 countries in the African Great Lakes Region.

== Background and education ==
Liberata Rutageruka was born in April 1956 in Misenyi, Kitobo Musibuka, Bukoba District, in Kagera Region. She has a twin sister by the name Iluminata Maerere who also served as UNDP seara Lione. She attended primary school locally, starting at the age of six years. She completed her O-Level education at Tabora Girls School in 1973. She went on to graduate with the equivalent of a high school diploma from Mzizima Secondary School in 1975, after completing her A-Level studies.

From 1977 until 1980, Liberata studied at the University of Dar es Salaam, graduating with a Bachelor of Arts degree, majoring in Political Science and International Relations. Later, she earned a Master of Arts degree in Government and Politics, from St. John's University in New York City, in 1989. Still later, St. John's University awarded her a Postgraduate Diploma in International Law.

== Politics ==
While Liberata is a career diplomat, she did not enter into politics until her appointment by President Jakaya Kikwete, as the Permanent Secretary at the Ministry of Foreign Affairs in 2015. Following the sudden death of president John Magufuli, she was appointed as the new Minister of Foreign affairs on 31 March 2021 in the 6th Cabinet of Tanzania. Mulamula was simultaneously, concurrently nominated to the Parliament of Tanzania (2020-2025).

== Personal life ==
Liberata Rutageruka was born on 10 April 1956 in Muleba, Bukoba, Kagera Region. She is the mother of two children.
