= Adolf Mkenda =

Tanzanian economist and politician

Honorable Adolf Mkenda MP

Minister of Education, Science, Technology and Vocational Training
- Incumbent
- Assumed office 10 January 2022
- President: Samia Suluhu
- Preceded by: Joyce Ndalichako

Minister of Agriculture
- In office 6 December 2020 – 10 January 2022
- President: John Magufuli (2020); Samia Suluhu (2021)
- Preceded by: Japhet Hasunga
- Succeeded by: Hussein Bashe

Member of Parliament for Rombo
- Incumbent
- Assumed office 2020
- Preceded by: Joseph Selasini Shao
- Constituency: Rombo, Tanzania

Personal details
- Born: Adolf Faustine Mkenda; 1963 (age 62–63) Rombo, Rombo District, Kilimanjaro Region, Tanganyika
- Citizenship: Tanzanian
- Party: Chama Cha Mapinduzi
- Spouse: Beatrice Kalinda Mkenda
- Education: University of Gothenburg (PhD); University of Dar es Salaam (BA) (MA)

Adolf Faustine Mkenda (born in 1963) is a Tanzanian Minister of Education, Science, and Technology, having previously served as Minister of Agriculture. An associate professor of Economics at the University of Dar es Salaam and a politician who presently serves as a Chama Cha Mapinduzi's Member of Parliament for Rombo constituency since November 2020.

== Political career ==
After the 2020 Tanzanian general election, Mkenda was appointed as the Minister of Agriculture in both 5th Cabinet of Tanzania and 6th Cabinet of Tanzania. Before this appointment, he served in various capacities as Permanent Secretary Ministry of Natural Resources and Tourism (2019-2020), Permanent Secretary Ministry of Foreign Affairs and East Africa Cooperation (2018-2019) and Permanent Secretary Ministry of Industry, Trade and Investment (2017-2018). Following Magufuli's second term, Mkenda was appointed as the Minister of Agriculture a post he held through various reshuffles. In January 2022, Mkenda was appointed Minister for Education, Science, and Technology.
