= Innocent Bashungwa =

Tanzanian politician

Honourable Innocent Lugha Bashungwa MP
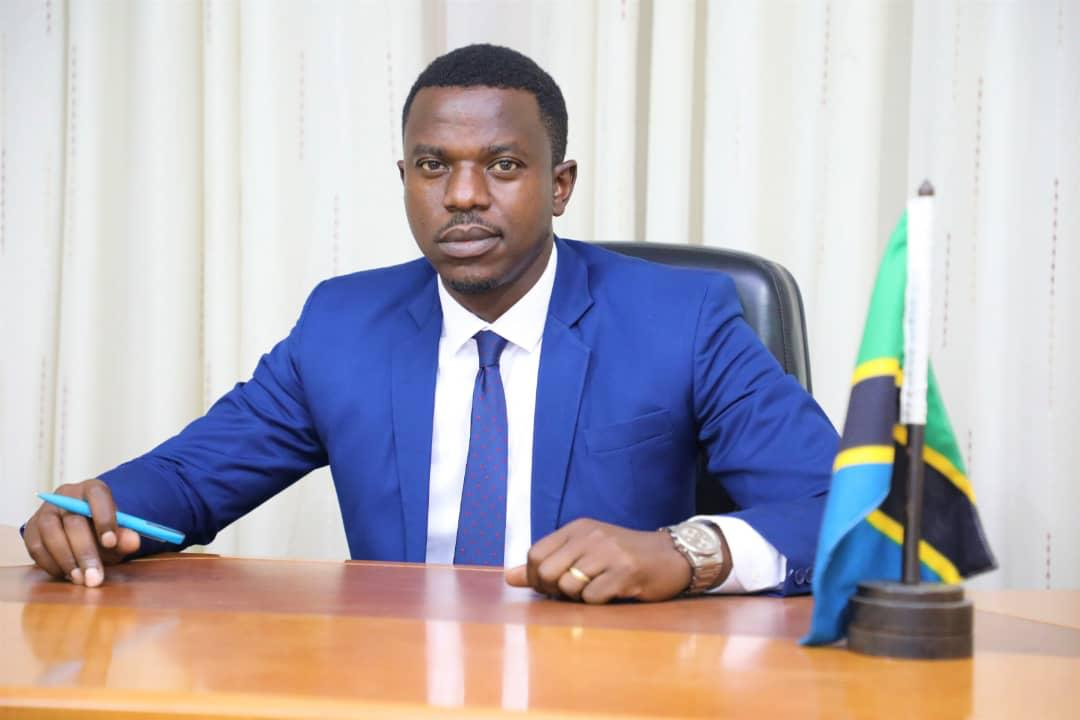

Minister of Home Affairs
- Incumbent
- Assumed office 8 December 2024
- President: Samia Suluhu
- Preceded by: Mh. Hamad Yusuf Masauni

Minister of Works
- In office 1 September 2023 – 8 December 2024
- President: Samia Suluhu
- Preceded by: Makame Mbarawa
- Succeeded by: Abdallah Hamis Ulega

Minister of Defence and National Service
- In office 3 October 2022 – 31 August 2023
- President: Samia Suluhu
- Preceded by: Stergomena Tax
- Succeeded by: Stergomena Tax

Minister of Information, Culture, Arts and Sports
- In office 5 December 2020 – 10 January 2022
- President: John Magufuli (2020); Samia Suluhu (2021)
- Preceded by: Harrison Mwakyembe
- Succeeded by: Mohamed Mchengerwa

Minister of Industry and Trade for Tanzania
- In office 8 June 2019 – 16 June 2020
- President: John Magufuli
- Preceded by: Joseph Kakunda
- Succeeded by: Geofrey Mwambe

Member of Parliament for Karagwe District
- Incumbent
- Assumed office December 2015

Personal details
- Born: 5 March 1979 (age 47) Karagwe District, Kagera Region, Tanzania
- Party: Chama Cha Mapinduzi
- Spouse: Jennifer Bash
- Education: St. John's University of Tanzania; Columbia University; Open University of Tanzania

Innocent Lugha Bashungwa (born 5 May 1979) is a Tanzanian politician who has served as the Minister of Works in Tanzania since 2023. He previously served as Minister of Information, Culture, Arts and Sports, Minister of Defence and National Service and a Minister of State in the President's Office (Regional Administration and Local Government) in Tanzania and is a member of the Chama Cha Mapinduzi political party. He was elected MP representing Karagwe in 2015.

== Political career ==
He was appointed Deputy Minister of Agriculture by President John Magufuli on 10 November 2018. On 13 November 2018, he was sworn in as Deputy Minister. In June 2019, Joseph Kakunda was replaced by Innocent Bashungwa as the minister of Industry, Trade and Investment, he went on to serve at this docket for a year before the parliament was dissolved on 16 June 2020.

In Magufuli's second cabinet, he was appointed as the Minister of Information, Culture, Artists and Sports. Following the January 2022 reshuffle of the Suluhu Cabinet, he assumed the position of the Minister of State in the President's Office.
