= Ashatu Kijaji =

Tanzanian academic and politician

Honourable Ashatu Kijaji MP
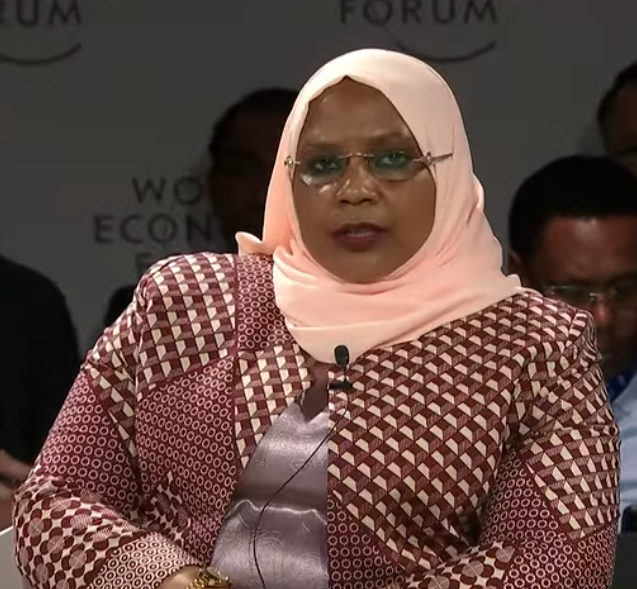
- At a WEF special meeting in 2024

Minister of Natural Resources and Tourism
- Incumbent
- Assumed office 17 November 2025
- President: Samia Suluhu
- Preceded by: Pindi Chana

Minister of Livestock and Fisheries
- In office 8 December 2024 – 13 November 2025
- President: Samia Suluhu
- Preceded by: Abdallah Ulega
- Succeeded by: Bashiru Ally

Minister of State in the Vice President’s Office
- In office July 2024 – 8 December 2024
- President: Samia Suluhu
- Preceded by: Selemani Jafo
- Succeeded by: Hamad Masauni

Minister of Industry and Trade
- In office 10 January 2022 – July 2024
- President: Samia Suluhu
- Preceded by: Geofrey Mwambe
- Succeeded by: Selemani Jafo

Minister of Communication & ICT
- In office 12 September 2021 – 8 January 2022
- President: Samia Suluhu
- Preceded by: Faustine Ndugulile
- Succeeded by: Nape Nnauye

Deputy Minister of Finance and Planning
- In office December 2015 – September 2021
- President: John Magufuli
- Minister: Philip Mpango

Member of Parliament
- Incumbent
- Assumed office November 2015
- Constituency: Kondoa

Personal details
- Born: 26 April 1976 (age 50) Kondoa District, Tanzania
- Party: CCM
- Education: Mzumbe University; University of Agder

Ashatu Kijaji (born 26 April 1976) is a Tanzanian academic and politician belonging to the ruling Chama Cha Mapinduzi (CCM) party. She is a Member of Parliament for Kondoa Constituency in Dodoma Region and the Minister of Industry and Trade.

== Background and education ==
Kijaji was born on April 26, 1976, in Kondoa District, Dodoma Region. She completed her primary school in Kalamba Primary School in 1990, then completed her Ordinary level secondary education in Kilakala secondary school in 1994 and thereafter from 1995 to 1997 joined Shinyanga Commercial School commonly known as SHYCOM for her Advanced level secondary education. In 2001, she received her Advanced Diploma in Economic Planning from the then Institute of Development Management - Mzumbe which is equivalent to Bachelor of Science in Economics currently offered by now Mzumbe University. She then acquired her Master of Science in Business Administration specialized in International Management from the University of Agder, Norway in 2008. She also acquired her PhD in International Management Majoring in Economics from the same University of Agder, Norway in 2013.

She worked as a Planning Officer for the Kisarawe District Council from March 2002 to August 2002 and then as an Assistant Lecturer from 2005 to 2009, Lecturer in Development Economics and International Management from 2009 to 2012 and Senior Lecturer in DevelopmentEconomics and International Management from July 2012 to October 2015 at her alma mater Mzumbe University where she later became the Director of Planning.

== Political career ==
Kijaji became involved with the ruling Chama Cha Mapinduzi party in 2004. She first became a Member of Parliament after she won as the ruling CCM party's candidate for Kondoa in the 2015 Tanzanian general election. She faced Yasin Shabani of the Civic United Front and two other minor candidates. She won receiving 37,795 votes to Shabani's 23,570.

Kijaji was appointed Deputy Minister in the Ministry of Finance and Planning in the newly elected President John Magufuli's administration in December 2015. As part of this role, she was involved in the drafting of the second Five Year Development Plan, which she presented to Parliament in February 2016. The plan seeks to encouraging industrialization to drive economic growth and social development. She was appointed Minister of the newly established Ministry of Investment, Industry and Trade since 10 January 2022. In July 2023, she retained her cabinet position; however, the Ministry of Investments was moved under the president's office.

== Publications ==
=== Books and research reports ===
- Kijaji, Ashatu (2020). Kamsese Kametaga: Taarifa ya Utekelezaji wa Ilani ya CCM Jimbo la Kondoa 2015 hadi 2020.
- Kijaji, Ashatu (2018). Kamsese Kametaga: Taarifa ya Utekelezaji wa Ilani ya CCM Jimbo la Kondoa 2015 hadi 2018.
- Kijaji, Ashatu (2013). The Influences on and Perceptions of Fringe Benefits: Evidence from Local and Foreign Companies in Tanzania. Doctoral Dissertation at the University of Agder 72
- Kijaji, Ashatu and Kachwamba, M. (2009). Determinants of Firms' Export Performance: Empirical Evidence from Tanzanian Manufacturing Firms. VDM Publisher, ISBN 978-3-639-19419-7
- Kijaji, Ashatu and Mwagike L. (2006). Challenges and Opportunities of Implementing HIV/AIDS Education in Tanzania Primary Schools: The Case of Kisarawe District Council. Research Report. ISBN 9987-617-73-5. Mzumbe University, Tanzania.
- Kijaji, A and Nsimbila, P. (2005). Violence in Marriage in Tanzania: The Case of Shinyanga and Tabora. Research Report No. 42, ISBN 9987-617-54-9 Mzumbe University, Tanzania.

=== Refereed journals ===
- Kijaji, Ashatu & Kachwamba, Muhajir, (2011). "Low Quality Products in Developing Countries' Market. Is it one of Globalization Challenges?" International Review of Social Sciences and Humanities, Vol. 2(1), pp 26–36
- Kijaji, Ashatu (2011). "Employees' Awareness and Perceptions of Fringe Benefit Packages: A Case of Local and Foreign Owned Companies in Tanzania". International Journal of Business and Management Studies, Vol. 3(2), pp 43–53
- Kijaji, Ashatu (2011). "The Influence of Labor Market Institutions in Designing Employees' Fringe Benefit Packages: A Case of Local and Multinational Banks in Tanzania". International Journal of Humanities and Social Sciences, Vol.1(5), pp 94–104
- Kijaji, Ashatu & Mwakasangula, E. (2010). "Environmental conflicts between farmers and pastoralists: A burning issue in Kilosa District-Tanzania". African Affairs Journal, Vol. 27 (2), pp. 121–150
- Kijaji, Ashatu (2009). "The Use of Triangulation in Social Sciences Research: Can Qualitative and Quantitative Methods be Combined?" Journal of Comparative Social Work, Vol. 1, pp 1–12 (With 930+ Citations to date)
- Kachwamba, M and Kijaji, Ashatu. (2009). "Determinants of E-government maturity: Do Organizational Specific Factors Matter?" US-China Public Administration, Vol. 6, pp 1–7
- Kachwamba, M & Kijaji, Ashatu (2008). "Factors Influencing Literacy Rate in Tanzania". Uongozi Journal of Management & Development Dynamics, ISSN 0856-1435.

=== Refereed conference proceedings ===
- Kachwamba, M. & Kijaji, A. (2009). "Role of e-information on the Ex-ante Transaction Cost Facing Foreign Investors in Developing Economies". In Hahamis, P. (Ed. 9th European Conference on e-Government. Academic Publishing Limited, ISBN 978-906638-33-7, OCLC 624408892, University of Westminster, London, UK
- Kijaji, A and Kachwamba, M (2009). "The Influence of Country-Of-Origin on Human Resource Strategy of Multinational Companies in Developing Countries". Selected papers published in the proceedings of the 2009 International Conference on Advanced Management Science (ICAMS 2009), Singapore, pp 368–372, ISBN 978-0-7695-3653-8
- Kachwamba, M and Kijaji, A (2009). "Determinants of E-government maturity: Do Organizational Specific Factors Matter?" Kaplan, A; Akta, C and Dalbay, O (editors). Selected Proceedings of the First International Conference on e-government and e-governance held on 12–13 March 2009 Ankara, Turksat and Social Science Research Society, pp 67–78.
- Kijaji, A and Kachwamba, M (2009). "Perceptions on Barriers Towards Exporting: Case of Tanzanian Manufacturing Small and Medium Size Enterprises (SMEs)". Kocak, A; Abimbola, T; Ozer, A and Watkins-Mathys, L (editors). Marketing and Entrepreneurship. Ankara, Siyasal Yayinevi Tum Haklari Saklidir, pp 145–158, ISBN 978-605-5782-06-1
- Kijaji, Ashatu. (2011). "Employees' awareness and perceptions of fringe benefit packages: A case of local and foreign owned companies in Tanzania". The International Conference on Business and Management - Organized by the Social Sciences Research Society, held in Izmir-Turkey 15 – 17 April 2011
- Kijaji, Ashatu & Newenham-Kahindi, A. (2010). "The influence of labor market institutions in designing the structure and value of fringe benefit packages: A case of local and multinational banks in Tanzania". International Symposium on HRM and the creation of effective organizations in Africa - Special Call by the: International Journal of Human Resource Management, Nottingham Business School, UK, 13 – 14 October 2010
