= Harrison Mwakyembe =

Tanzanian politician

Honourable Dr Harrison Mwakyembe MP
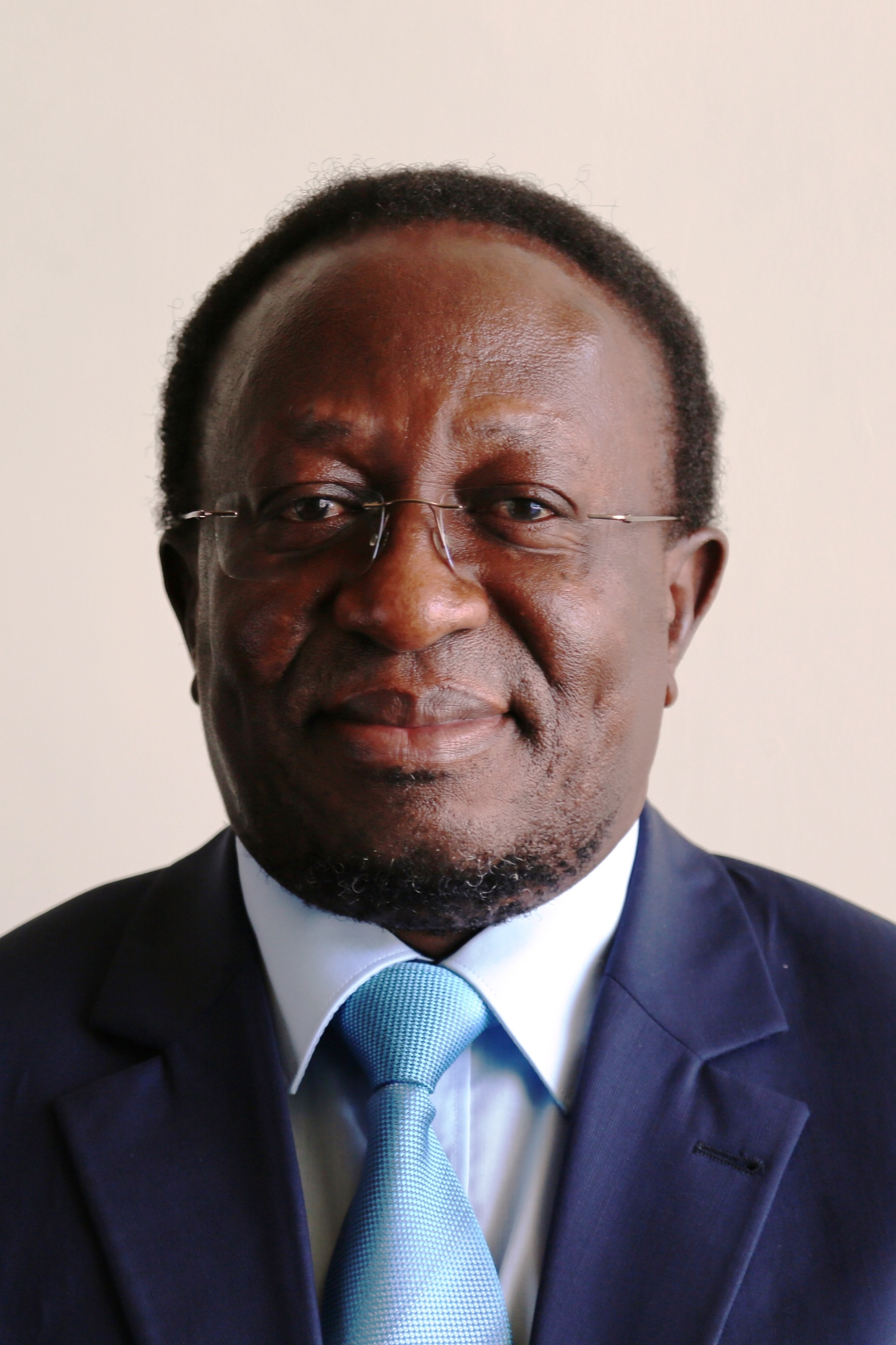

Minister for Information, Culture, Artists and Sports
- In office 23 March 2017 – 16 June 2020
- President: John Magufuli
- Preceded by: Nape Nnauye
- Succeeded by: Innocent Bashungwa

Minister for Constitutional Affairs and Justice
- In office 12 December 2015 – 23 March 2017
- President: John Magufuli
- Preceded by: Asha-Rose Migiro
- Succeeded by: Palamagamba John Aidan Mwaluko Kabudi

5th Minister of East African Cooperation
- In office 24 January 2015 – 5 November 2015
- President: Jakaya Kikwete
- Preceded by: Samuel Sitta

Minister of Transport
- In office 7 May 2012 – 24 January 2015
- Preceded by: Omari Nundu
- Succeeded by: Samuel Sitta

Deputy Minister of Works
- In office 28 November 2010 – 7 February 2012
- Minister: John Magufuli

Member of Parliament for Kyela
- Incumbent
- Assumed office December 2005
- Preceded by: John Mwakipesile

Personal details
- Born: 10 December 1955 (age 70) Kyela District, Mbeya Region, Tanganyika Territory
- Party: CCM
- Education: University of Dar es Salaam; The University of Hamburg (Dr. jur.); University of Turin (PGCert)

== Early life and education ==
Dr Harrison George Mwakyembe was born on 10 December 1955 in Kyela in the Southern Highlands Province in colonial Tanganyika. The Southern Highlands Province was divided into Mbeya Region and Iringa Region after Tanganyika won independence from Britain. Kyela is in Mbeya Region and was once a part of Rungwe District. The provinces were divided into regions in February 1962 after Tanganyika won independence on 9 December 1961.

Harrison Mwakyembe is a younger brother of Daimon Mwakyembe, former director of the Tanzania Bureau of Standards (TBS). Daimon was a schoolmate of African studies scholar and author Godfrey Mwakikagile at Mpuguso Middle School in Rungwe District in the Southern Highlands Province in the early sixties. One of Mwakikagile's teachers at Mpuguso was Leonard Levitt, from the American Peace Corps, who became a prominent journalist and renowned author whose works include An African Season, the first book ever written by a member of the Peace Corps.

Other alumni of Mpuguso Middle School include Brigadier-General Owen Rhodfrey Mwambapa, Mwakikagile's first cousin and a graduate of Sandhurst and head of the Tanzania Military Academy, an army officers' training school; Oscar Mwamwaja, one of Tanzania's first commercial airline pilots and also Mwakikagile's cousin; and David Mwakyusa who became a member of parliament for Rungwe West and cabinet member as Minister of Health and Social Welfare under President Jakaya Kikwete. David Mwakyusa was also the last personal doctor of the first president of Tanzania and father of the nation Mwalimu Julius Nyerere and was with him when Nyerere died at a hospital in London, England, in October 1999.

Another elder brother of Harrison Mwakyembe, younger brother of Daimon Mwakyembe, who also attended Mpuguso Middle School in the early sixties was Morrison Mwakyembe who was a classmate of Oscar Mwamwaja. They were one year behind Mwakikagile.

Harrison Mwakyembe attended Tukuyu Primary School and Kituli Primary School. He also attended Tabora Boys Secondary School. He later enrolled as a student at the Tanzania School of Journalism in Dar es Salaam where he obtained a Diploma in Journalism before going to the University of Dar es Salaam where he studied law and earned a Bachelor of Laws (LLB). He did post-graduate work in law at the University of Turin, specialising in intellectual property, and earned a certificate before proceeding with his studies. He obtained a Master of Laws (LLM) from the University of Hamburg and continued with his studies at the same school where he also earned a doctorate in law.

He later became a lecturer and then senior lecturer in law at the University of Dar es Salaam where he also served, at different times, as head of the department of international law and the department of constitutional and administrative law.

== Political career ==
Harrison Mwakyembe was elected as a member of the East African Legislative Assembly representing Tanzania (2001–2005) and as a member of parliament in 2005 representing Kyela, a position he lost in 2020 and was replaced by fellow ccm cadet Ally Mlaghila.

He has also served in different capacities as a cabinet member under two presidents. He was Deputy Minister of Works (28 November 2010 – 7 February 2012), Minister of Transport (7 May 2012 – 24 January 2015) and Minister of East African Cooperation (24 January 2015 – 5 November 2015) under President Jakaya Kikwete; and Minister for Constitutional Affairs and Justice (12 December 2015 – 23 March 2017) and Minister for Information, Culture, Artists and Sports since 23 March 2017 under President John Magufuli. While in parliament, Mwakyembe was appointed a member of a parliamentary committee on Investment and Trade (2006–2010) and served as the committee's vice chairman. And from 2012 to 2015, he was a member of the Infrastructure Development Committee.

== Working experience career ==
Work experience
Year	Position	Organization
2020–present	Council chairman	Muhimbili University of Health and Allied Sciences
2001–2005	Commissioner, joint Presidential Supervisory Commission	Zanzibar Revolution government
1999–2002	Head, Department of Constitution and administration Law	University of Dar es Salaam
1997–2004	Senior Lecturer in Law	University of Dar es Salaam
1997–1999	Head, Department of International Law	University of Dar es Salaam
1997–2003	Chairman of Governing Council of the Tanzania School of Journalism	Prime Minister's Office
1991–1997	Lecturer in Law	University of Dar es Salaam
1986–1990	Assistant Lecturer	University of Dar es Salaam
1984–1986	Tutorial Assistant in Law	University of Dar es Salaam
1983–1983	State Attorney Trainee	Ministry of Justice
1978–1980	Journalist	National Broadcasting Cooperation of Tanzania
1977–1978	Journalist	Information Department of Tanzania

== Memorable work ==
=== Richmond corruption scandal ===
On 13 November 2007 the member of parliament of Tanzania was formed a five-member committee headed by Kyela MP, Dr. Harrison Mwakyembe, to investigate on the Richmond corruption scandal involved Edward Lowassa. On 7 February 2008, Edward Lowassa was forced to resign after being implicated in the Richmond Energy deal corruption scandal. This followed a parliamentary committee report on an emergency power generation contract between the Tanzania Electric Supply Company Ltd (TANESCO), a public corporation, and a US company styled Richmond Development Company LLC of Houston, Texas. The Mwakyembe committee found the contract to have been fraudulently concluded, hence unconscionable. Richmond was contracted to provide 100 megawatts of electricity each day after a drought early in 2006 but the Richmond generators arrived late and did not work as expected. In spite of this, the government paid Richmond more than $100,000 a day. Lowassa's office then influenced the government's decision to extend Richmonds contract despite advice to the contrary form TANESCO. Two other cabinet ministers who had held the energy portfolio, Dr. Ibrahim Msabaha and Nazir Karamagi were forced to resign as well.

== See also ==
- Treni ya Mwakyembe, commuter rail in Dar es Salaam, Tanzania.
