= Stergomena Tax =

Tanzanian diplomat (born 1960)

Stergomena Lawrence Tax
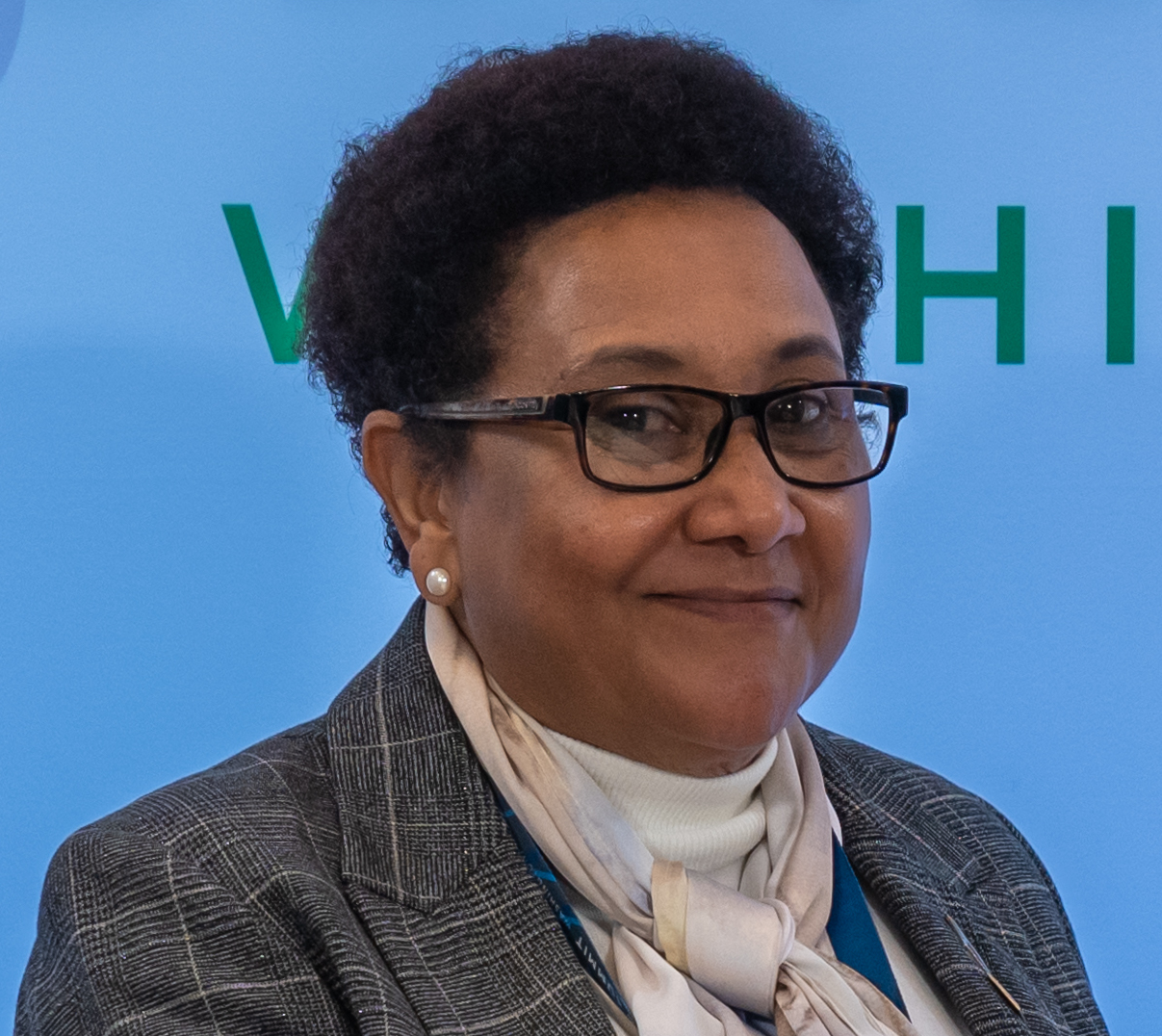

Minister of Defence and National Service
- In office 1 September 2023 – 03 November 2025
- President: Samia Suluhu
- Prime Minister: Kassim Majaliwa
- Preceded by: Innocent Bashungwa
- Succeeded by: Rhimo Simeon Nyansaho
- In office 13 September 2021 – 3 October 2022
- President: Samia Suluhu
- Prime Minister: Kassim Majaliwa
- Preceded by: Elias John Kwandikwa
- Succeeded by: Innocent Bashungwa

Minister of Foreign Affairs and East African Cooperation
- In office 3 October 2022 – 31 August 2023
- President: Samia Suluhu
- Prime Minister: Kassim Majaliwa
- Preceded by: Liberata Mulamula
- Succeeded by: January Makamba

4th Executive Secretary of SADC
- In office September 2013 – 15 August 2021
- Preceded by: Tomaz Salomão
- Succeeded by: Elias Mpedi Magosi

Permanent Secretary at the Ministry of East African Cooperation
- In office November 2008 – August 2013
- President: Jakaya Kikwete
- Succeeded by: Joyce Mapunjo

Personal details
- Born: 6 July 1960 (age 66) Magu, Mwanza, Tanganyika
- Party: Chama Cha Mapinduzi
- Children: 2
- Education: University of Dar es Salaam; University of Tsukuba

Stergomena Lawrence Tax (born 6 July 1960) was Tanzania's minister of defence and national service from 1 September 2023 to 3 November 2025, she became the first woman to hold the title since the country’s independence. She was previously the minister of foreign affairs and East African cooperation. Before that she served as the executive secretary of the Southern African Development Community (SADC).

== Early life ==
Tax was educated at a number of primary schools in Tanzania and at Lake Secondary School in Mwanza where she was a contemporary of Tanzanian fifth president John Magufuli.

She obtained her Bachelor of Commerce degree in Finance from the University of Dar es Salaam in 1991. She thereafter obtained a Master of Philosophy in Policy Management and Development Economics and a Doctor of Philosophy in International Development from the University of Tsukuba in Japan.

== Career ==
She served as the Permanent Secretary at the Ministry of East African Cooperation from 2008 to 2013, when she was appointed as the Executive Secretary of the Southern African Development Community at the 33rd Summit of the Heads of State and Government in Lilongwe, Malawi.

In August 2021, she was replaced by Elias Mpedi Magosi as secretary of SADC. On 10 September 2021, she was nominated Member of Parliament by President Samia Suluhu Hassan. On 12 September 2021, she was appointed Minister of Defence. On 3 October 2022, she was appointed minister of foreign affairs. On 1 September 2023, following another cabinet reshuffle, she resumed her previous docket as Minister of Defence and National Service.
