= William Lukuvi =

Tanzanian politician (1955–2026)

Honourable William Lukuvi MP
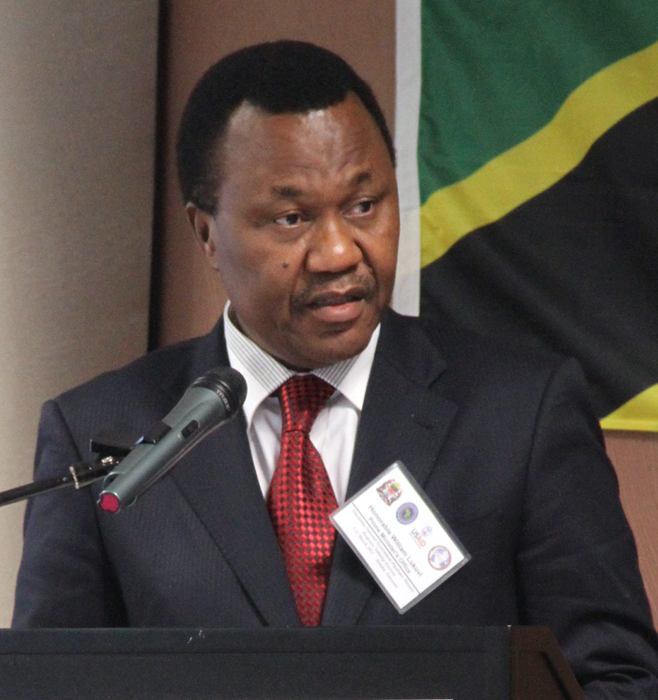
- Lukuvi in 2011

Senior Adviser to the President for Political and Social Relations
- In office 13 June 2023 – 25 March 2026 Serving with Rajab Omar Luhwavi, Haji Kheir, Abdallah Bulembo
- President: Samia Suluhu Hassan
- Preceded by: Office established

Minister of Lands, Housing and Human Settlements Developments
- In office 24 January 2015 – 8 January 2022
- Preceded by: Anna Tibaijuka
- Succeeded by: Angeline Mabula

State Minister in the PM's Office for Policy, Co-ordination and Parliamentary Affairs
- In office 28 November 2010 – January 2015
- Preceded by: Philip Marmo
- Succeeded by: Jenista Mhagama

Member of Parliament for Ismani
- Incumbent
- Assumed office November 1995

Personal details
- Born: 15 August 1955 Mapogoro, Tanganyika Territory
- Died: 25 March 2026 (aged 70) Dodoma, Tanzania
- Party: CCM
- Education: Tabora TTC (Cert); Open University of Tanzania

William Vangimembe Lukuvi (15 August 1955 – 25 March 2026) was a Tanzanian CCM politician who was a Member of Parliament for Ismani constituency. Until 8 January 2022, he was the Minister for Lands, Housing and Human Settlement Development. He completed Master of Arts in political science at Open University of Tanzania.

On 13 June 2023, he was appointed by President Samia Suluhu Hassan to be an adviser to the President (on political and social relations) together with another three appointees.

== Death ==
Lukuvi died on 25 March 2026, at the age of 70. He had suffered a heart attack and was hospitalised at Benjamin Mkapa Hospital in Dodoma.
