= Patrobas Katambi =

Tanzanian politician

Honorable Patrobas Katambi MP

Deputy Minister Labour, Youth and Employment
- Incumbent
- Assumed office December 2020
- President: John Magufuli
- Preceded by: Anthony Mavunde

Member of Parliament
- Incumbent
- Assumed office November 2020
- Preceded by: Stephen Masele
- Constituency: Shinyanga Urban

Personal details
- Born: 21 April 1984 (age 42)
- Party: Chama Cha Mapinduzi 2017 -
- Other political affiliations: CHADEMA (until 2017)
- Education: St. Augustine University of Tanzania; Law School of Tanzania
- Occupation: Civil servant
- Profession: Advocate

Patrobas Katambi, also known as Paschal Katambi Patrobas, is a Tanzanian politician and Deputy Minister, Prime Minister's Office Labour, Youth and Employment and has been Chama Cha Mapinduzi's member of parliament for the Shinyanga Urban constituency since November 2020.

Katambi is also a civil servant who was a Dodoma district commissioner until 2020, appointed by then President John Magufuli. He was a party youth chairman for the opposition party in Tanzania, CHADEMA, and a member of the Central Committee of the National Ethics Committee of the party until 2017.
