= Makame Mbarawa =

Tanzanian politician

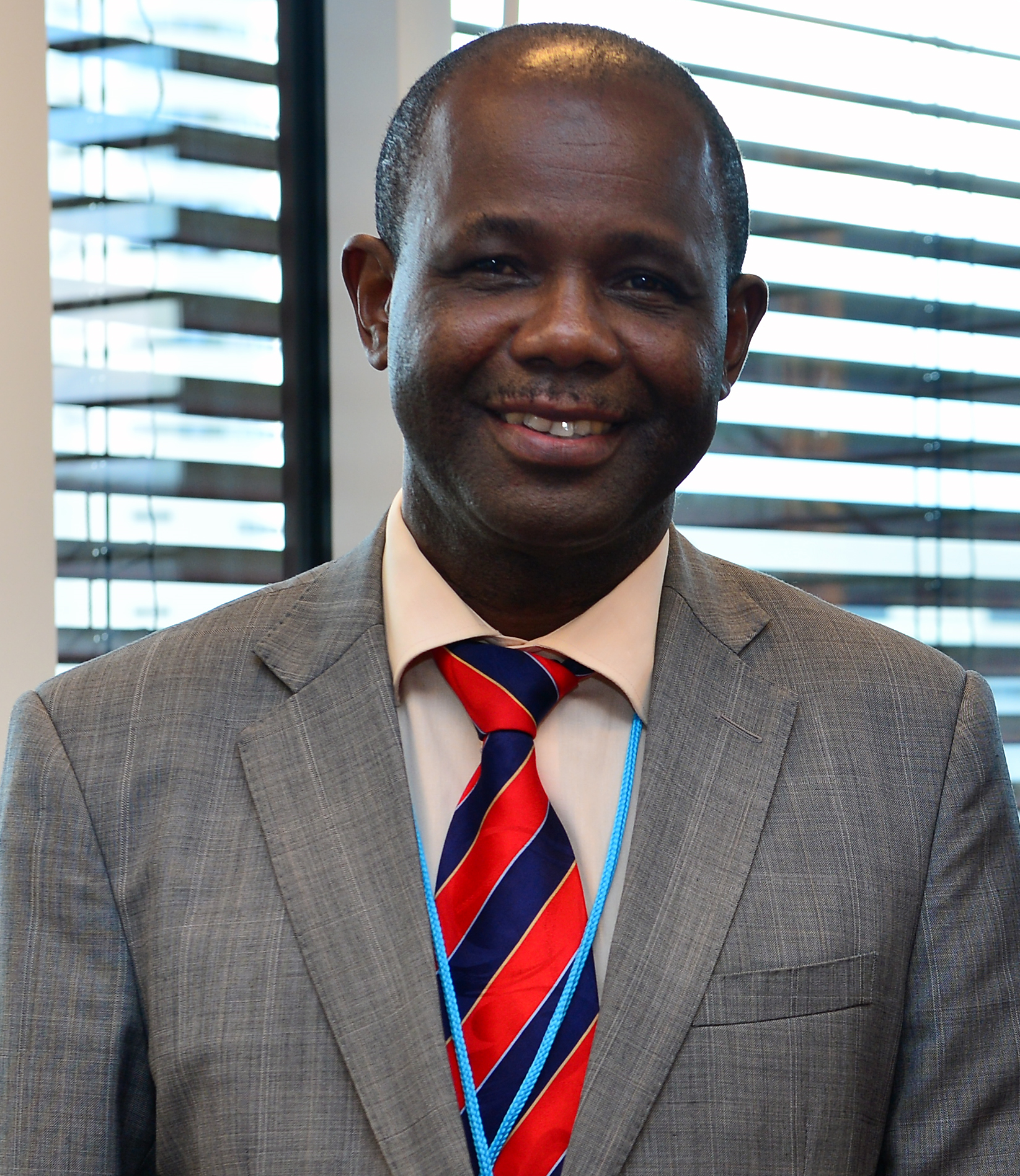

Ministry of Transport
- Incumbent
- Assumed office 1 September 2023
- President: Samia Suluhu
- Preceded by: Himself as Minister of Works & Transport

Minister of Works & Transport
- In office 12 September 2021 – 31 August 2023
- President: Samia Suluhu
- Preceded by: Leonard Chamuriho
- Succeeded by: Innocent Bashungwa (Works)

8th & 11th Minister of Water and Irrigation
- In office 1 July 2018 – 16 June 2020
- President: John Magufuli
- Preceded by: Isack Aloyce Kamwelwe
- Succeeded by: Jumaa Hamidu Aweso
- In office 12 December 2015 – 23 December 2015
- President: John Magufuli
- Preceded by: Jumanne Maghembe
- Succeeded by: Gerson Lwenge

Minister of Works, Transport and Communication
- In office 23 December 2015 – 1 July 2018
- President: John Magufuli
- Preceded by: John Magufuli
- Succeeded by: Isack Aloyce Kamwelwe

Minister of Communication, Science and Technology
- In office December 2010 – 5 November 2015
- President: Jakaya Kikwete
- Deputy: January Makamba
- Preceded by: Peter Msolla
- Succeeded by: Dr. Joyce Ndalichako (Education, Science, Technology and Vocational Training)

Member of Parliament
- Incumbent
- Assumed office November 2010
- Appointed by: Jakaya Kikwete; John Magufuli
- Constituency: None (Nominated MP)

Personal details
- Born: 12 February 1961 (age 65) Pemba, Zanzibar
- Party: CCM
- Education: Astrakhan State Technical University (MSc); University of New South Wales (PhD)
- Profession: Professor
- Positions: Professor, Tshwane University of Technology (2009-2010)

Professor Makame Mbarawa is a Tanzanian CCM politician and a nominated Member of Parliament. He is currently the Minister of Transport in Tanzania.

== Political career ==
He served as the Minister of Communication, Science & Technology from 2010 to 2015. He thereafter served as the Minister of Water and Irrigation in the Magufuli administration for eleven days before being transferred to head the infrastructure docket. He continued as the Minister of Works and Transport once president Samia Suluhu Hassan took office in 2021. Following her reshuffle of the cabinet in September 2023, he retained his role over just the Minister of Transport as the ministry was split into two.
