= Eliezer Feleshi =

Tanzanian attorney general

Hon. Justice Dr. Eliezer Mbuki Feleshi

10th Attorney General of Tanzania
- Incumbent
- Assumed office 13 September 2021
- President: Samia Suluhu
- Preceded by: Adelardus Kilangi
- Constituency: Ex officio member

Personal details
- Born: July 1, 1967 (age 59) Malya, Mwanza, Tanzania

DktEliezer Mbuki Feleshi (born 1 July 1967) is the current Attorney General of Tanzania and is the 10th Attorney General of Tanzania since the country's independence in 1961. He was appointed as the new Attorney General following the Suluhu Cabinet reshuffle in September 2021. Before being the Attorney General, Dr Feleshi was the principal judge of the High Court of Tanzania since 2018.
