= Ministry of Health and Social Welfare (Tanzania) =

Ministry of Health, Tanzania
- Wizara ya Afya (Swahili)

Ministry overview
- Superseding Ministry: Ministry of Health, Community Development, Gender, Elders and Children
- Jurisdiction: Government of Tanzania
- Headquarters: Dodoma
- Minister responsible: Jenista Mhagama
- Deputy Minister responsible: Godwin Mollel
- Ministry executive: Ag. Permanent Secretary
- Website: moh.go.tz

The Ministry of Health is a government ministry of Tanzania. Its central offices are located in Dodoma. Its mission is to "facilitate the provision of basic health services that are good, quality, equitable, accessible, affordable, sustainable[,] and gender-sensitive".

It was merged with the Ministry of Health, Community Development, Gender, Elders and Children under John Magufuli's reforms.

== Organization ==
The structure of the ministry is as follows:

=== Office of the Chief Medical Officer ===
==== Preventive Services Division ====
- Epidemiology and Diseases Control Section
- Reproductive and Child Health Section
- Environmental Health, Hygiene and Sanitation Section
- Health Education and Promotion Section
- Nutritional Services Section

==== Curative Services Division ====
- Public and Private Health Services Section
- Diagnostic and Health Care Technical Services Section
- Traditional and Alternative Medicine Section
- Oral Health Services Section
- Non Communicable Diseases, Mental Health and Substance Abuse Section

==== Human Resources Development Division ====
- Health Human Resources Planning Section
- Allied Health Sciences Training Section
- Nursing Services Training Section
- Continue Education and Postgraduate Training Section
- Social Welfare Staff Development Section

==== Health Quality Assurance Division ====
- Pharmaceutical Services Section
- Health Services Inspectorate and Quality Assurance Section
- Health Emergency Preparedness and Response Section
- Nursing Services Section

=== Social Welfare Division ===
- People with Disabilities and Elderly Persons Section
- Family, Child Welfare Services and Early Childhood Development Section
- Juvenile Justice Services Section

=== Administration and Human Resources Management Division ===
- Administration Section
- Human Resources Management Section

=== Policy and Planning Division ===
- Policy Section
- Planning Section
- Monitoring Evaluation and Performance Reporting Section

=== Miscellaneous units ===
- Information and Communication Technology Unit
- Legal Services Unit
- Finance and Accounts Unit
- Government Communication Unit
- Internal Audit Unit
- Procurement Management Unit

== See also ==
- Medical Stores Department
- Government of Tanzania
