= Elias John Kwandikwa =

Tanzanian politician (1966–2021)

Honourable Elias John Kwandikwa MP

Minister of Defence and National Service
- In office 9 December 2020 – 2 August 2021
- President: John Magufuli; Samia Suluhu Hassan
- Preceded by: Hussein Mwinyi
- Succeeded by: Stergomena Tax

Deputy Minister of Works, Transport and Communication
- In office October 2017 – November 2020
- President: John Magufuli
- Preceded by: Eng. Godfrey Kasekenya

Member of Parliament for Ushetu
- In office November 2015 – 2 August 2021

Personal details
- Born: 1 July 1966 Kahama District, Tanzania
- Died: 2 August 2021 (aged 55)
- Party: CCM
- Children: 3
- Education: The Institute of Finance Management (Advanced Diploma in Accountancy); Eastern and Southern African Management Institute (MBA)

Elias John Kwandikwa (1 July 1966 – 2 August 2021) was a Tanzanian CCM politician and Member of Parliament for the Ushetu constituency from 2015 to 2021.

He was a Deputy Minister of Works, Transport and Communications, until 9 October 2017. He then served as Minister of Defence and National Service from December 2020 until his death in August 2021.

== Background and education ==
He was born on 1 July 1966, in the Shinyanga Region of Tanzania. He attended Kisuke Primary School, from 1977 until 1983. He then transferred to Mwenge Secondary School for his middle school studies from 1984 until 1987. For his high school education, he studied at Shinyanga Secondary School, from 1988 until 1990.

He studied at The Institute of Finance Management from 1997 until 1999, graduating with an Advanced Diploma in Accountancy. In 2004, the National Board of Accountants and Auditors (NBAA), awarded him a certificate as a Certified Public Accountant (CPA). He then obtained a Master of Business Administration, from the Eastern and Southern African Management Institute (EASAMI), in 2015.

== Work experience ==
His entire professional career has been spent in the Office of the Controller and Auditor General. He began as a Clerk Examiner Grade II, back in 1990, serving in that capacity until 1995. He was promoted to Clerk Examiner Grade I in 1995, serving in that capacity until 1997. From 1997 until 1999, he served as an Accounts Examiner Grade III.

From 1999 until 2000, he was the Assistant Resident Auditor for the Pwani Region. He took some time off to study for his CPA examinations. When he returned in 2005, he was appointed the Assistant Resident Auditor for the Tanzania Revenue Authority, serving in that capacity for less than one year. Later in 2005, he was appointed Chief Accountant in the Office of the Controller and Auditor General, serving there until 2015.

== Political career ==
Elias Kwandikwa was an active member of the ruling Chama Cha Mapinduzi, starting back in 1991, when he served as a member of the party's central committee. He has held several positions in the Youth Wing of the party, at local, regional and national levels over the years. In 2015, he contested the parliamentary seat for Ushetu constituency on the CCM political party ticket. He won and was the incumbent. On 9 October 2017, he was sworn in by president John Magufuli, as the Deputy Minister of Works, Transport and Communication. In 2020, in Magufuli's second cabinet, Kwandikwa was given the keys to the Ministry of Defense and National Service after Hussein Mwinyi was elected President of Zanzibar. He served in this position until his death.

== Death ==
Elias Kwandikwa died at Muhimbili National Hospital in Dar es Salaam on 2 August 2021, at the age of 55.

== See also ==
- Cabinet of Tanzania
- Parliament of Tanzania
