= Deogratius Ndejembi =

Vice President of Tanzania

Vice-President of Tanzania
- Incumbent
- Assumed office 9 September 2026
- President: Samia Suluhu Hassan
- Preceded by: Emmanuel Nchimbi

Personal details
- Born: 12 July 1983 (age 43)
- Party: CCM
- Education: University of Lincoln

Deogratius John Ndejembi (born 12 July 1983) is a Tanzanian politician serving as the Vice-President of the United Republic of Tanzania since 4 September 2026, after being sworn-in and having taken the oath of office on 29 August 2026. He replaced Emmanuel Nchimbi, who resigned from office.

Before his appointment, he held several senior government positions, including Minister for Lands, Housing and Human Settlements Development and Minister of State in the Prime Minister's Office responsible for Labour, Youth, Employment and Persons with Disabilities. He has also served as Deputy Minister in the President's Office responsible for Regional Administration and Local Government and as a Member of Parliament for Chamwino Constituency in Dodoma. He holds a Bachelor's degree in International Relations from the University of Lincoln.
