= Dorothy Gwajima =

Tanzanian politician

Honorable Dorothy Gwajima MP
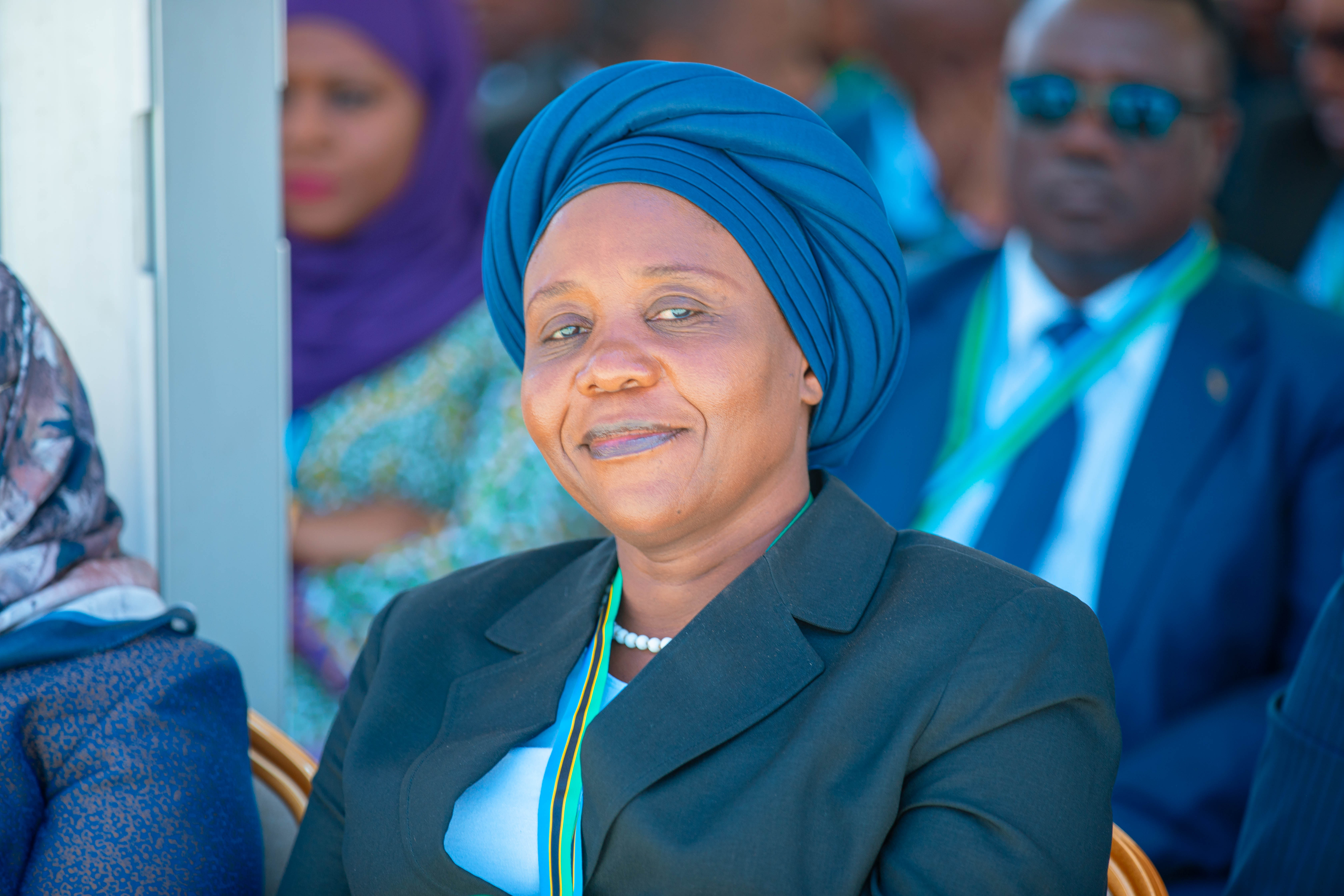

Minister of Community Development & Gender
- Incumbent
- Assumed office 10 January 2022
- President: Samia Suluhu
- Preceded by: Position Established

Minister of Health, Community Development, Gender, Seniors and Children
- In office 5 December 2020 – 8 January 2022
- President: John Magufuli (2020); Samia Suluhu (2021)
- Preceded by: Ummy Mwalimu
- Succeeded by: Ummy Mwalimu Ministry split

Member of Parliament
- Incumbent
- Assumed office 8 December 2020
- President: John Magufuli
- Constituency: None (Nominated MP)

Personal details
- Born: 21 March 1971 (age 55) Iramba, Singida Region, Tanzania
- Party: Chama Cha Mapinduzi
- Spouse: Methuselah Steven Gwajima
- Education: Wembere Primary School, Marangu Secondary School, Mwenge Secondary School
- Alma mater: Privolzhsky Research Medical University (BA); Royal Tropical Institute (MA)

Dorothy Onesphoro Gwajima also known Gwajima Dorothy is a Tanzanian CCM politician and a nominated cabinet member since 2020. She was appointed by President John Magufuli into the Magufuli cabinet as the Minister of Health, Community Development, Gender, Elders and Children. She continued in this role following the death of John Magufuli, however, in January 2022 the ministry was split and she became the new Minister of Community Development, Gender, Women and Special Groups.

She became widely known after announcing that Tanzania did not plan to order any COVID-19 vaccines and promoting steam inhalation as a cure against the virus, along with a vegetable smoothie recipe and other cures, in line with President Magufuli's claims.
