= Jerry Silaa =

Tanzanian politician and business man

Honourable Jerry William Silaa MP

Minister of ICT
- Incumbent
- Assumed office 1 September 2023
- Preceded by: Angeline Mabula

Member of Parliament
- Incumbent
- Assumed office November 2020
- President: John Magufuli (2020-2021); Samia Suluhu (2021-present)
- Constituency: Ukonga

Personal details
- Born: Jerry William Silaa; 9 February 1982 Dar es Salaam
- Party: CCM
- Education: University of Dar es Salaam (BSc) The Open University of Tanzania (LLB) Maastricht University (MBA)

Jerry William Silaa (born 9 February 1982 in Dar es Salaam) is a Tanzanian politician who is currently the Minister of ICT.
