= Ministry of Lands, Housing and Human Settlements Developments =

Government ministry of Tanzania

- Wizara ya Ardhi, Nyumba na Maendeleo ya Makazi (Swahili)

Ministry overview
- Jurisdiction: Government of Tanzania
- Headquarters: Ghana Street, Dar es Salaam; 6°48′45″S 39°17′17″E
- Minister responsible: William Lukuvi
- Deputy Minister responsible: Angeline Mabula
- Ministry executive: Permanent Secretary
- Website: ardhi.go.tz

The Ministry of Lands, Housing and Human Settlements Developments is a government ministry of Tanzania that "has been mandated to administer land and human settlement" in the country.
