= Ministry of Foreign Affairs and East African Cooperation =

Ministry of Tanzania

- Wizara ya Mambo ya Nje na Ushirikiano wa Afrika Mashariki (Swahili)
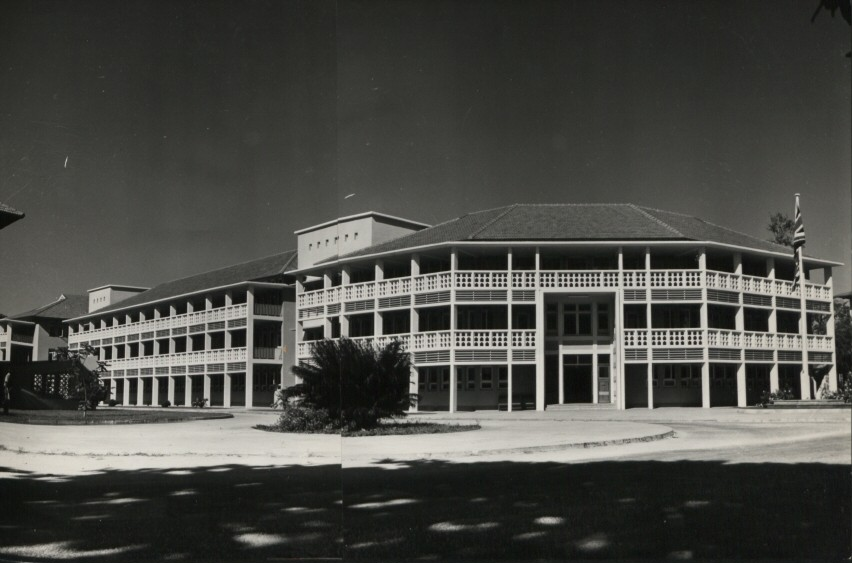

Ministry overview
- Formed: 1964
- Preceding Ministry: Ministry of East African Cooperation
- Jurisdiction: Government of Tanzania
- Headquarters: Mtumba, Dodoma; 6°49′0″S 39°17′40″E
- Minister responsible: Mahmoud Thabit Kombo
- Deputy Minister responsible: Cosato David Chumi
- Ministry executives: Amb. Samuel Shelukindo, Permanent Secretary; Said Shaib Mussa, Deputy Permanent Secretary
- Key document: Presidential Circular No. 2 of 1964
- Website: www.foreign.go.tz/%20Website

The Ministry of Foreign Affairs and East African Cooperation is a government ministry of Tanzania. The ministry is headed by Mahmoud Thabit Kombo, and its offices are located at Mtumba in Dodoma.

== History ==
The ministry of foreign affairs was set up following Tanganyikan independence in 1961, but until 1963, it was a department of the prime minister's office with Oscar Kambona as the first minister. The ministry of external affairs was created in 1964 with Stephen Mhando as its first minister. The name of the ministry has been changed three times since 1975, first to foreign affairs and then to the Ministry Foreign Affairs and International Cooperation.

John Magufuli merged the Ministry of East African Cooperation into the department, renaming it to the Ministry of Foreign Affairs and East African Cooperation.

== See also ==
- List of heads of missions of Tanzania
- List of diplomatic missions of Tanzania
- List of diplomatic missions in Tanzania
