= Adelardus Kilangi =

9th Attorney General of Tanzania

Hon. Justice Amb.Prof.Dr. Adelardus Kilangi

9th Attorney General of Tanzania
- In office 1 February 2018 – 11 September 2021
- President: John Magufuli (2018–2020); Samia Suluhu (2020–2021)
- Preceded by: George Masaju
- Succeeded by: Eliezer Feleshi
- Constituency: Ex officio member

Personal details
- Born: 6 April 1969 (age 57) Tanzania
- Education: University of Dar Es Salaam

Professor Adelardus Lubango Kilangi was the 9th Attorney General of Tanzania.

== Early life and career ==
Professor Kilangi was born 6 April 1969. Kilangi was a member of the African Union Commission on International Law. He also served as the president of the commission from 2012 to 2014. Prior to the appointment he was also a director at St. Augustine University of Tanzania and served at various capacities at the university. In 2013 Kilangi released research work, "The Principle of Permanent Sovereignty over Natural Resources: Its Application in Regulating the Mineral Sector in Tanzania".

=== Attorney General ===
Kilangi succeeded George Masaju and preceded Eliezer Feleshi. Kilangi was sworn in by President John Pombe Magufuli on Monday, 9 November 2020 at State House in Dodoma.

=== Ambassador ===
In December 2021, Kilangi was appointed as the Tanzanian ambassador to Brazil.
