= Ummy Mwalimu =

Tanzanian politician (born 1973)

Honourable Ummy Mwalimu MP
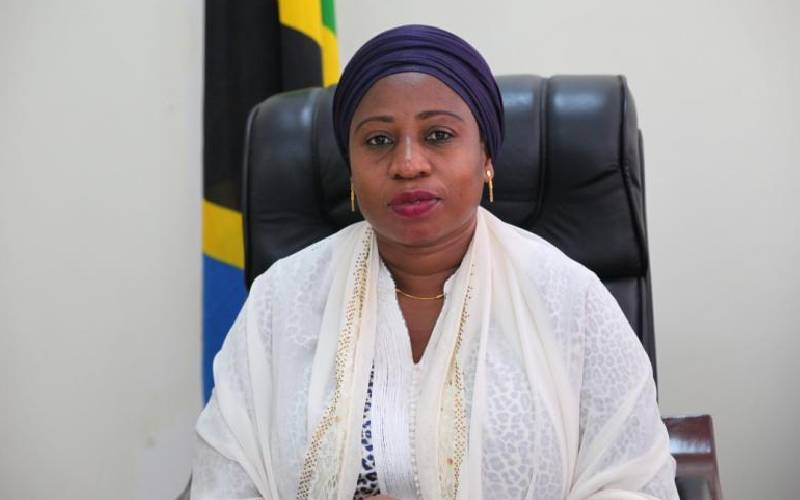

Minister of Health
- Incumbent
- Assumed office 10 January 2022
- President: Samia Suluhu
- Preceded by: Dorothy Gwajima

Minister of State in the Vice President’s Office (Union and Environment)
- In office 9 December 2020 – 10 January 2022
- President: John Magufuli
- Preceded by: Mussa Zungu
- Succeeded by: Jenista Mhagama

Minister of Health, Community Development, Gender, Elderly and Children
- In office 12 December 2015 – 5 November 2020
- President: John Magufuli
- Succeeded by: Dorothy Gwajima

Deputy State Minister of Environment
- In office 30 January 2014 – 5 November 2015
- Minister: Binilith Mahenge
- Preceded by: Charles Kitwanga

Deputy Minister of Community Development, Gender and Children
- In office 28 November 2010 – 20 January 2014

Member of Parliament
- Incumbent
- Assumed office November 2010
- Constituency: None (Special Seat)

Personal details
- Born: 5 September 1973 (age 53)
- Party: CCM
- Education: UDSM (LL.B); University of Pretoria (LL.M)

Ummy Ally Mwalimu (born 5 September 1973) is a Tanzanian politician belonging to the ruling Chama Cha Mapinduzi (CCM) party. She is currently a member of Parliament for Tanga Constituency and most recently served as the minister of health until August 2024, when she was succeeded by Jenista Mhagama. She has held various cabinet positions since 2010. She is a third-term member of Parliament, firstly appointed to a seat reserved for women in the parliament of Tanzania in 2010.

== Background and education ==
Ummy Mwalimu was born on September 5, 1973, in Tanga. She completed her schooling from the Korogwe Girls Secondary School in 1993. in 1998, she received a Bachelor of Laws from the University of Dar es Salaam. She received her Master of Laws degree from the University of Pretoria in 2001.

Between 2000 and 2010, she worked in various governmental and NGO agencies in legal, research and governance roles.

== Political career ==
Mwalimu first became involved with the CCM in 2007. She is a two-term member of Parliament as a member of CCM. In 2010 and again in 2015, she was appointed to a seat reserved for women by the president.

In President Jakaya Kikwete's administration, she served in a succession of ministerial roles. Between 2010 and 2014, she was deputy minister in the Ministry of Community Development, Gender and Children. She also served as deputy minister in the vice president's office and the Ministry of Justice and Constitutional Affairs.

In 2015, the newly elected President John Magufuli appointed Mwalimu as minister for Health, Community Development, Gender, Elderly and Children.

As health minister, she banned the importation and sale of sexual lubricants in Tanzania, stating this would curb homosexuality, which is criminalized in Tanzania. This stance has been condemned by NGOs and goes against UNAIDS recommendation that providing water-based lubricants along with condoms can help curb the spread of HIV.

Mwalimu has stated her support for ending underage marriage, and assured activists she would table a bill in Parliament amending the laws that allow persons under the age of 18 to get married. Once the law is passed, this practice will be illegal.

In December 2020 she was appointed by President Magufuli as the minister of state in the Vice President's Office (Union and Environment). In March 2021, she was appointed by President Samia Suluhu Hassan to be the minister of state in the President's Office Regional Administration and Local Government - OR - TAMISEMI. Following the second cabinet reshuffle in January 2022, she returned to her previous cabinet position as minister of Health, Seniors and Children.
