= Ministry of Livestock and Fisheries (Tanzania) =

Government ministry of Tanzania

- Wizara ya Maendeleo ya Mifugo na Uvuvi (Swahili)

Ministry overview
- Jurisdiction: Government of Tanzania
- Headquarters: Dar es Salaam; 6°49′0″S 39°17′40″E
- Minister responsible: Abdallah Ulega
- Ministry executives: Elisante Ole Gabriel, Permanent Secretary - Livestock; Rashid Tamatamah, Permanent Secretary - Fisheries
- Website: www.mifugouvuvi.go.tz

The Ministry of Livestock and Fisheries is a government ministry in Tanzania. Its mission is to "build and support the technical and professional capacity of local government authorities and [the] private sector ... to develop, manage, and regulate the livestock and fisheries resources sustainably."

The Minister for Livestock and Fisheries is Abdallah Ulega.

== Blue economy ==
Tanzania has adopted the blue economy drive by setting aside a huge amount to improve productivity & efficiency in fish farming and deep sea fishing.

Government of Tanzania are set to supply Small and Medium Entrepreneurs with 320 modern fishing boats so they can benefit from the blue economy.
