= Ministry of Information, Culture, Arts and Sports (Tanzania) =

Government ministry of Tanzania

Ministry overview
- Jurisdiction: Government of Tanzania
- Headquarters: Dar es Salaam
- Minister responsible: Innocent Bashungwa
- Deputy Minister responsible: Hamis Mwinjuma
- Ministry executive: Professor Ole Gabriel, Permanent Secretary
- Website: www.habari.go.tz

The Ministry of Information, Culture, Arts and Sports is a government ministry of Tanzania. The ministry was founded in 2006 by presidential notice, merging extant sections of sports, information, and culture into one functional ministry.

== Organization and operations ==
Departments of the Ministry include the following:

Information Development

- Department is responsible to collect, write and disseminate government statements; to collect and disseminate news and news material; to organize government news conferences and news briefings; to monitor and coordinate news bureaus, radio news and television news, and other information-related duties.

Culture Development

- Traditions and culture; arts, music, cinema; languages
- Bagamoyo College of Art

Sports Development

- Registration of leagues and associations; planning and construction of stadiums and sports facilities; stadium management; sports infrastructure development.
- Tanzania Football Federation

Policy & Planning

- Policy and planning

Administration

- Administration

== See also ==
- Government of Tanzania
