= Abdallah Ulega =

Tanzanian politician

Honourable Abdallah Hamis Ulega MP

Minister of Livestock and Fisheries
- President: Samia Suluhu
- Preceded by: Mashimba Ndaki

Member of Parliament for Mkuranga
- Incumbent
- Assumed office 2015
- President: John Magufuli 2015-2021; Samia Suluhu 2021-Present
- Preceded by: Kaika Talele

Personal details
- Born: September 28, 1979 (age 47) Tanzania
- Party: Chama Cha Mapinduzi
- Education: University of Dar es Salaam

Abdallah Hamis Ulega (born September 28, 1979) is a Tanzanian politician and a member of the Chama Cha Mapinduzi political party. He was elected MP representing Mkuranga in 2015. Ulega was the Deputy Minister for Livestock and Fisheries and was promoted in February 2023 as the Minister.
