= Mahmoud Thabit Kombo =

Tanzanian politician

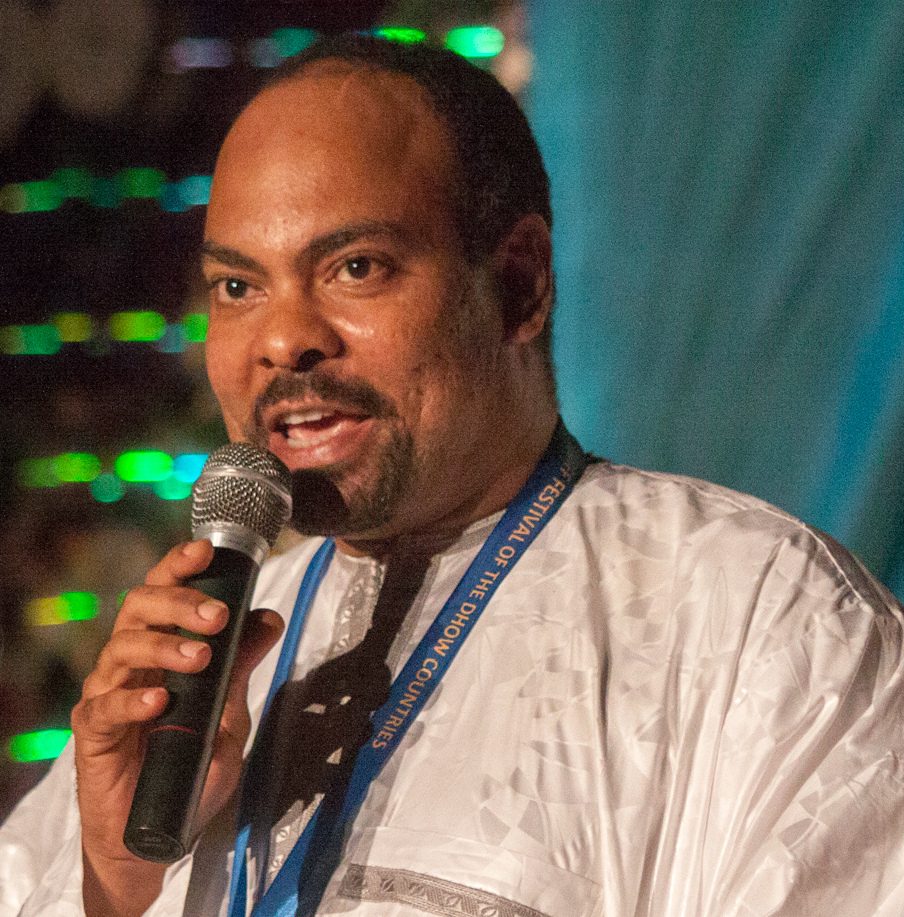
- Kombo in 2013

Minister of Foreign Affairs and East African Cooperation
- Incumbent
- Assumed office 26 July 2024
- President: Samia Suluhu
- Preceded by: January Makamba

Personal details
- Born: 8 July 1970 (age 56)
- Party: CCM
- Relations: Thabit Kombo (father)
- Education: University of Sunderland (BA); Geneva School of Diplomacy and International Relations (MA)

Mahmoud Thabit Kombo is a Tanzanian politician serving as the country's foreign minister. He is involved in community development projects across the country, including school development, environmental initiatives such as water and sanitation, as well as health and savings programs aimed at alleviating poverty.

== Early life and education ==
Kombo was born in Zanzibar, Tanzania. He began his formal education at Saateni Nursery School before attending Tumekuja Primary School. He completed his secondary education at Hamamni Secondary School and Lumumba College. Kombo studied at the University of Sunderland in the United Kingdom, earning a Bachelor of Arts in Business Accounting and Computing. He later obtained an MSc in Applied ICT and Artificial Intelligence from Cables and Wireless College in the UK. He also has a Master of Arts in International Relations and Diplomacy from the Geneva School of Diplomacy and International Relations.

== Career ==
He is regarded as a Tanzanian pillar in global diplomacy and plays a key role in navigating international relations. He has attended several diplomatic gatherings, including serving as chief guest during Japan’s National Day celebrations. Kombo also met with Iwaya Takeshi, Japan’s Minister of Foreign Affairs, to discuss strengthening relations between Japan and Tanzania.
