= Jumaa Aweso =

Tanzanian politician

Honourable Abduli Abedi Issa MP

12th Minister of Water and Irrigation
- Incumbent
- Assumed office 5 December 2020
- President: John Magufuli
- Preceded by: Makame Mbarawa

Deputy Minister for Water and Irrigation.
- In office October 2015 – May 2020
- President: John Magufuli
- Minister: Makame Mbarawa

Member of Parliament
- Incumbent
- Assumed office November 2015
- Constituency: Pangani, Tanga

Personal details
- Born: 22 March 1985 (age 41) Pangani District, Tanga Region, Tanzania
- Party: CCM
- Spouse: Zainab Abdallah
- Children: 2
- Education: Dar es Salaam University (BSc); Open University of Tanzania (MA)

Jumaa Aweso (born 22 March 1985) is a Tanzanian politician and a member of the ruling party Chama Cha Mapinduzi (CCM) from 2012. He has been a Member of Parliament representing the Pangani Constituency in Tanga Region since 2015. He is the current Minister for Water and Irrigation.

== Background and education ==
The education history of Jumaa Hamidu Aweso, Starts from in 1994 to 2000 as awarded a CPEE at Mwambao Secondary, CSEE at Bagamoyo Secondary School, ACSEE at Pugu Secondary School and lastly at the Dar es Salaam University in 2013 where was awarded in bachelor's degree in Chemistry BSC.

== Political career ==
Jumaa Hamidu Aweso involved in politics of the Country few years after his schooling and three years later being appointed to be among of candidates of members of parliaments through his constituency for the general election of 2015 and to won the seat. As a member of Chama Cha Mapinduzi was elected to several positions like, member of Regional Executive Council UVCCM, District Youth League Commander, Member of District Council, Member of Regional Council, Member of National Executive committee of the ruling party of Chama cha Mapinduzi under the chairmanship of his H.E. President John Pombe Magufuli and the head of state.

In Magufuli's first cabinet we was appointed the Deputy Ministry of Water and Irrigation under the minister Makame Mbarawa. and the current deputy Minister in the Government of Tanzania in 2017. However, in 2020 in Magufuli's second cabinet he was promoted as the Ministry of Water and Irrigation.
