= Jenista Mhagama =

Tanzanian politician (1967–2025)

Honourable Jenista Mhagama

Ministers of State in the President’s Office
- In office 10 January 2022 – 11 December 2025
- President: Samia Suluhu
- Preceded by: Ummy Mwalimu

Minister of State in the Prime Minister's Office
- In office 11 December 2015 – 10 January 2022
- Prime Minister: Kassim Majaliwa
- Succeeded by: Joyce Ndalichako; Pindi Chana

Deputy Minister of Education and Vocational Training
- In office 20 January 2014 – 5 November 2015
- Preceded by: Philipo Mulugo

Member of Parliament for Peramiho
- In office 1 December 2005 – 11 December 2025
- Preceded by: Simon Mbilinyi

Personal details
- Born: 23 June 1967 Songea Mjini, Songea District, Ruvuma Region, Tanzania
- Died: 11 December 2025 (aged 58) Dodoma, Tanzania
- Party: CCM
- Spouse: Leonard Laurent Mhagama
- Children: Victor, Victoria and Joakim
- Education: Korogwe TTC (DipEd)
- Profession: Teacher

Military service
- Allegiance: United Rep. of Tanzania
- Branch/service: National Service
- Military camp: Mlale
- Duration: Two years

Jenista Joakim Mhagama (23 June 1967 – 11 December 2025) was a Tanzanian politician who was a Member of Parliament and the Minister of Health. She succeeded Ummy Mwalimu whose tenure in the role lasted 14 years. Mhagama was a politician belonging to the Chama Cha Mapinduzi (CCM) party, and had previously been a Member of Parliament for Peramiho constituency. In December 2015, she was appointed a Minister of State in the Prime Minister's Office responsible for Policy, Parliamentary Affairs, Labour, Employment, Youth and the Disabled in President John Magufuli's administration. In January 2022, she was moved to the President’s Office Good Governance and Public Services.

== Early life and education ==
Mhagama was born on 23 June 1967. She completed her schooling from Peramiho Girls' Secondary School in 1986. In 1989, she received her Diploma in Education from the Korogwe Teachers Training College. She worked as a teacher for six years between 1991 and 1997.

== Political career ==
Mhagama first became involved with CCM in 1987 and served in a variety of roles including in the youth and women wings of the party. She was first appointed to the Parliament from a special seat reserved for women in 2000.

In 2005, she defeated former Finance Minister Simon Mbilinyi in a primary for the right to represent CCM in the upcoming elections for Peramiho constituency in Ruvuma Region. An analysis found that Mhagama was the second most active MP in the 2005-2010 Parliament in terms of contributions to debates and questions to ministers.

Mhagama was the Deputy Minister for Education and Vocational Training in President Jakaya Kikwete's administration between January 2014 and January 2015. Then in a cabinet reshuffle, she was promoted and named Minister of State in the Prime Minister's Office for Policy, coordination and parliamentary affairs.

In the 2015 general elections, Mhagama won her Peramiho seat against CHADEMA candidate Erasmo Mwingira by a vote margin of 32,057 votes to 11,462. In the new President John Magufuli's cabinet, she was appointed a Minister in the Prime Minister’s Office for Labour, Employment, Youth and People with Physical Disabilities. In January 2022, she was moved to the President’s Office Good Governance and Public Services. Mhagama was sworn in as Tanzania's Minister of Health on 15 August 2024 by President Samia Suluhu Hassan.

== Death ==
Jenista Mhagama died in Dodoma, Tanzania on 11 December 2025, at the age of 58. After funeral services in Dodoma and Peramiho, her burial was scheduled to be held on 16 December in Ruanda Village in Mbinga District.
