= Ministry of Defence and National Service (Tanzania) =

Government ministry of Tanzania

- Wizara ya Ulinzi na Jeshi la Kujenga Taifa (Swahili)

Ministry overview
- Jurisdiction: Government of Tanzania
- Headquarters: Dar es Salaam
- Annual budget: $808 million (2017)
- Minister responsible: Rhimo Simeon Nyansaho
- Ministry executive: Dr. Faraji Kasid Mnyepe, Permanent Secretary
- Website: modans.go.tz

The Ministry of Defence and National Service (MODANS) is the government ministry of Tanzania that is responsible for defence and national service.

The ministry was established as an independent ministry in November 1995. It was under the control of the office of Second Vice President from 1972 to 1989, and under the control of the office of the President of Tanzania from 1989 to November 1995.

== Ministers ==
- Edward Sokoine, February 1972 - 1977
- Rashidi Mfaume Kawawa, 1977-1981
- Abdallah Twalipo, 1981-1983
- Muhidini Kimario, 1983-1985
- Salim Ahmed Salim, 1985-1989
- Jackson Makwetta, Minister of State, 1989-1990
- Amran Mayagila, Minister of State, 1990-1991
- Abdulrahman Kinana, Minister of State, 1991-1995
- Edgar Maokola Majogo, 1995-2000
- Philemon Sarungi, 2000-2006
- Juma Kapuya, 2006-2008
- Hussein Mwinyi, 2008-2012
- Shamsi Vuai Nahodha, 2012-2013
- Hussein Mwinyi, 2014-2020
- Elias John Kwandikwa, 2020-2021
- Stergomena Tax, 2021-2022
- Innocent Bashungwa, 2022-2023
- Stergomena Tax, 2023-Incumbent
