= Ministry of Works, Transport and Communications =

Government ministry of Tanzania

- Wizara ya Ujenzi (Swahili)

Ministry overview
- Jurisdiction: Government of Tanzania
- Headquarters: Dar es Salaam
- Minister responsible: Eng Isaac Kamwele
- Deputy Ministers responsible: Elias John Kwandikwa; Eng Atashasta Justus Nditiye
- Ministry executive: Permanent Secretary
- Website: www.mwtc.go.tz

The Ministry of Works, Transport and Communications is a government ministry of Tanzania. It was created in 2010 and is responsible for promoting a quality, efficient, environmentally friendly, and cost-effective construction industry that facilitates the social and economic development of the country.
