= Joyce Ndalichako =

Tanzanian politician

Honourable Professor Joyce Ndalichako MP

Minister for Education, Science, Technology and Vocational Training
- Incumbent
- Assumed office 5 November 2015
- President: John Magufuli
- Preceded by: Shukuru Kawambwa

Executive Secretary of National Examinations Council of Tanzania (NECTA)
- In office 2005–2014
- Preceded by: Dr Charles Msonde

Member of Parliament
- In office 2015–2020
- Appointed by: John Magufuli
- Constituency: None (Nominated MP)

Personal details
- Born: 21 May 1964 (age 62) Kigoma Kasulu
- Party: CCM (1982–present )
- Education: University of Dar Es Salaam (B.Sc. with Education); University of Alberta (PhD)

Joyce Lazaro Ndalichako is Minister of State (Policy, Parliament, Labour, Employment, Youth and the Disabled) in the Office of the Prime Minister of Tanzania. Previously she served as Minister of Education, Science, Technology and Vocational Training. She was appointed by the president of United Republic of Tanzania, John Magufuli, as a Member of Parliament and Minister for Education, Science, Technology and Vocational Training from 2015 in Tanzania.

== Early life and education ==
She was born on May 21, 1964, in Kasulu, Kigoma Region in Tanzania. She attended University of Dar Es Salaam from 1987–1991, where she graduated with Bachelor of Science with education, majoring in mathematics with an honor role. During 1993–1997 she had a scholarship to study in the University of Alberta, Edmonton, Alberta, Canada, where she obtained a PhD in educational psychology, major in educational statistics & measurement and evaluation.

== Career ==
From 2000 to 2005 she was the senior lecturer at the University of Dar Es Salaam teaching educational measurement and evaluation, research methods, and educational statistics, supervising dissertation of the students.

From 2014 to date she has been the associate professor and deputy head researcher at Agha Khan University Institute for Educational Development, East Africa
