= 2015 Chama Cha Mapinduzi presidential primaries =

CCM presidential primaries, 2015
- 3 June – 12 July 2015

2,455 votes from the National Congress
- Opinion polls
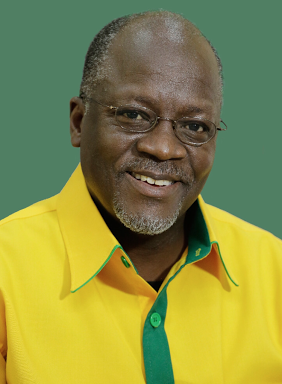

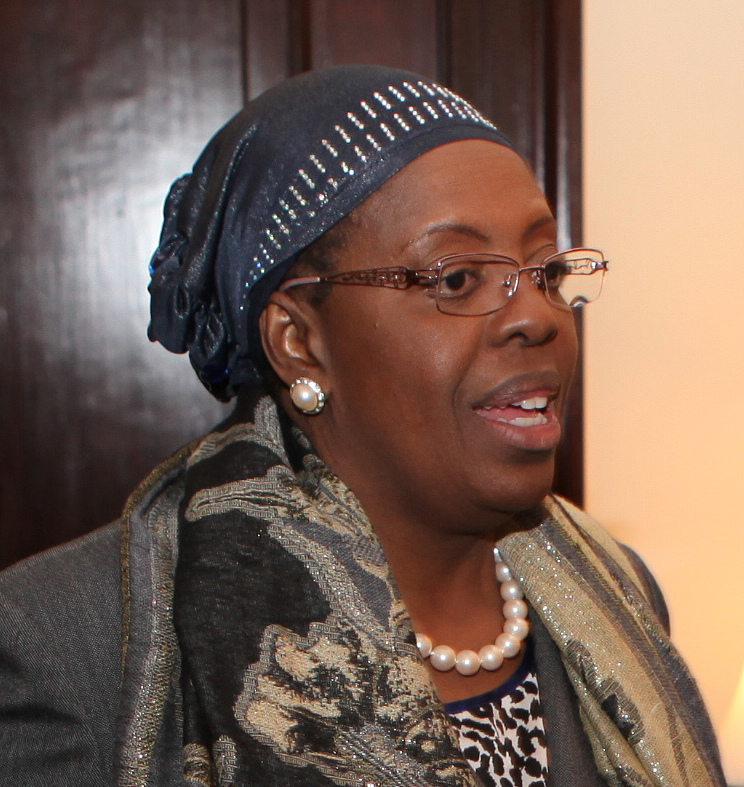

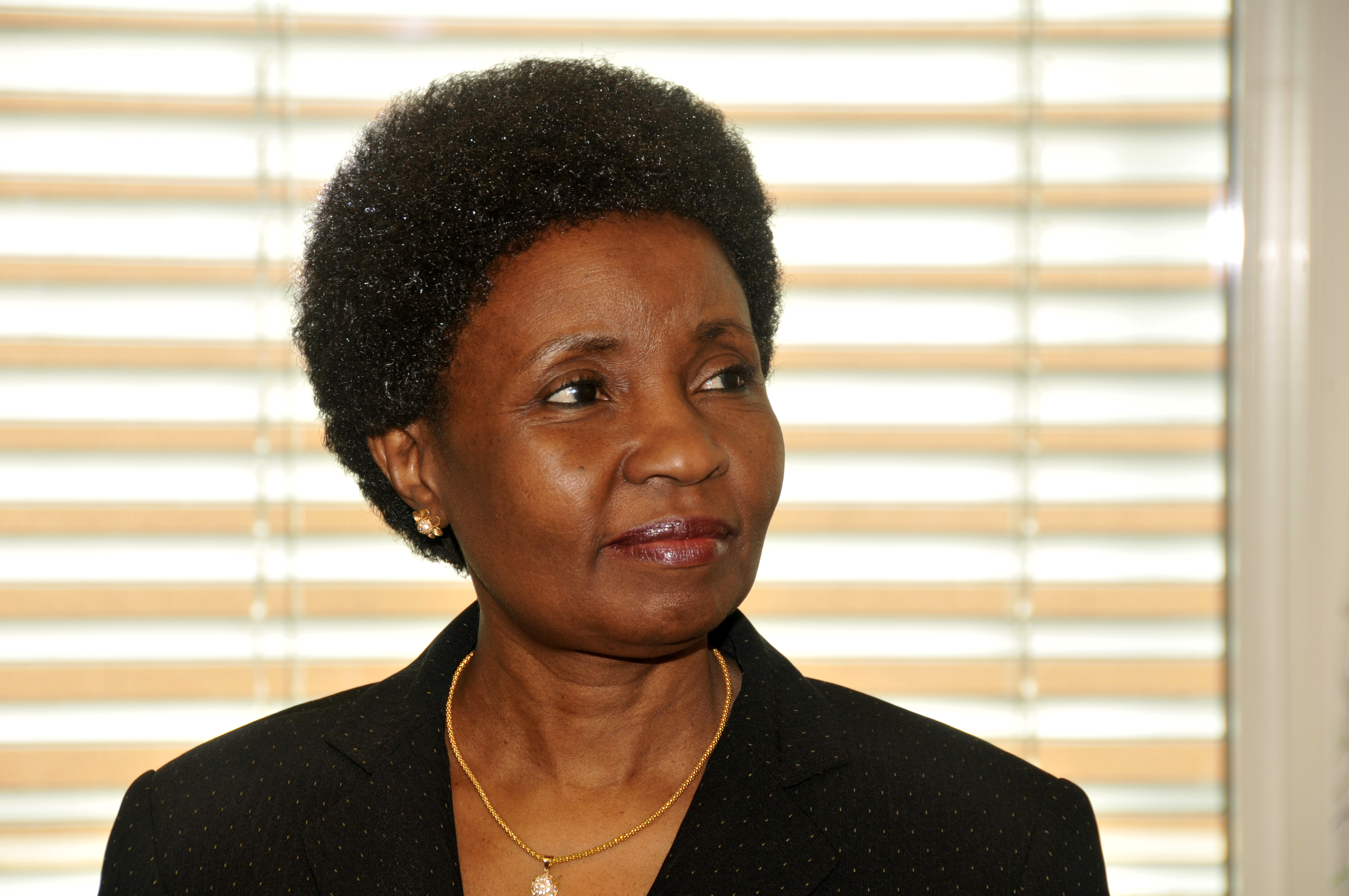
Candidate	John Magufuli	Amina Salum Ali	Asha Migiro
Popular vote	2,104	253	59
Percentage	87.09%	10.47%	2.44%
Hometown	Chato	Zanzibar	Songea
President before election
Jakaya Kikwete
CCM presidential nominee
John Magufuli

The Chama Cha Mapinduzi (CCM) presidential primaries, 2015 took place in July 2015 to determine CCM's nominee for the Presidency of Tanzania for the 2015 election. The Chama Cha Mapinduzi (Party of the Revolution) is the country's dominant ruling party, and the longest reigning ruling party in Africa.

Incumbent president and 2010 nominee Jakaya Kikwete is ineligible for re-election due to term limits. He is looking forward to his retirement, and has described the presidency as being both "stressful and thankless". Kikwete, who also serves as the party's National Chairman, said that he was not backing anyone as his preferred and chosen successor.

More than forty candidates (including 12 Cabinet Members) collected the nomination forms. On 12 July, Minister of Works John Magufuli was selected as the party's presidential nominee, and was most likely to win. He won the presidential election by 58.46%.

== Background ==
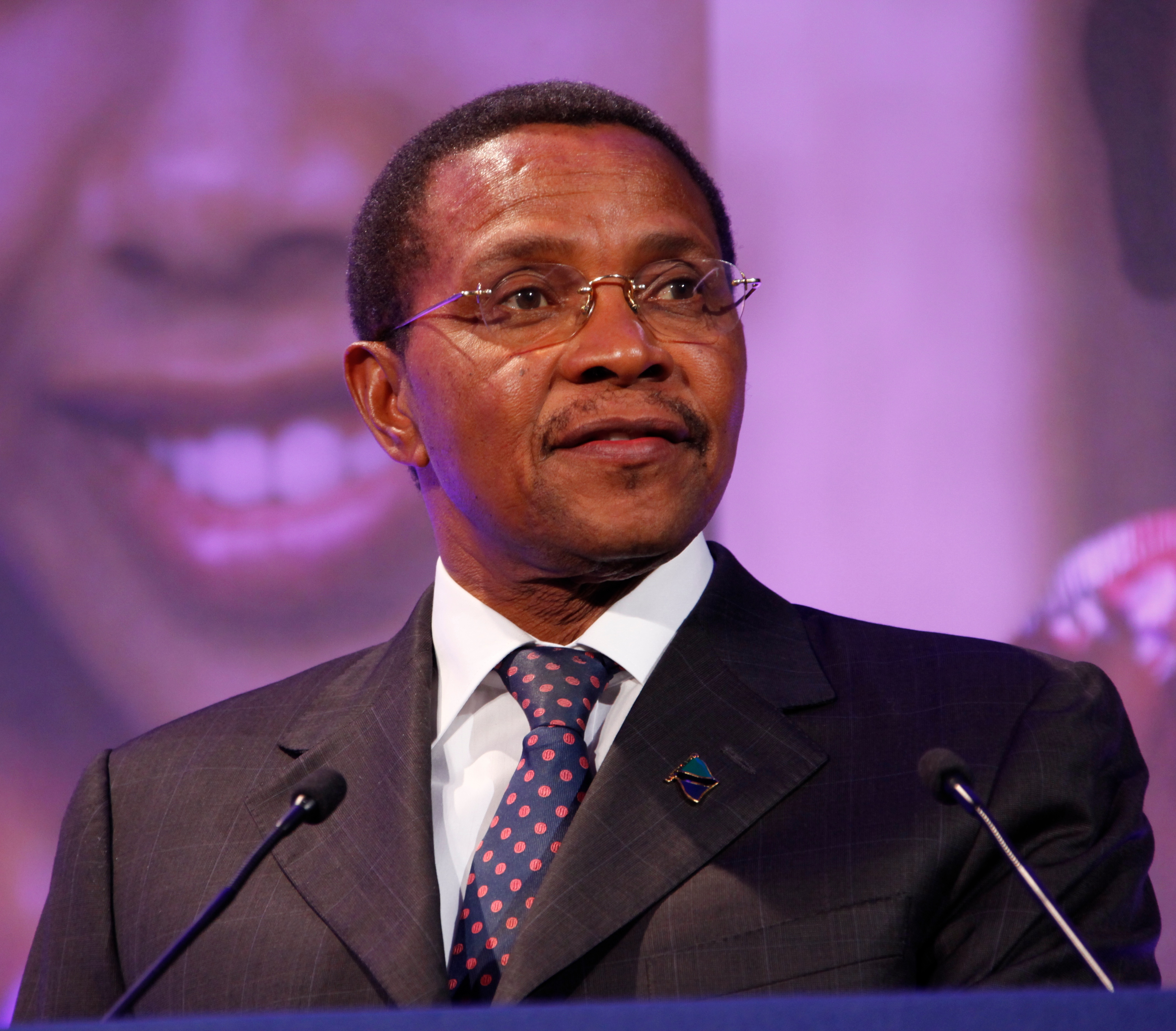
Kikwete has presided over an average economic growth of 7%.

=== Dodoma Six ===
In February 2014, the CCM's Central Committee summoned and interrogated six prospective candidates at the party's headquarters in Dodoma; and banned them from engaging in premature campaigns for a period of twelve months. They were former Prime Ministers Frederick Sumaye and Edward Lowassa, Foreign Minister Bernard Membe, Minister Stephen Wasira, Deputy Minister January Makamba and former Minister William Ngeleja. The ban was further extended in March 2015, before being lifted on 22 May 2015.

== Candidates ==
The following candidates have been listed according to the dates that they expressed interest or formally announced their candidacy.

Key

quadragenarian (40-49) quinquagenarian (50-59) sexagenarian (60-69) septuagenarian (70-79)

Candidate	Background	Notes
January Makamba	Born 1974 (age 41), Hometown: Lushoto, Tanga Region; Alma mater: St. John's University (Minnesota), George Mason University (MSc); Member of Parliament for Bumbuli (2010–present); Deputy Minister of Communication, Science and Technology (2012–present)	Son of Yusuf Makamba, a CCM stalwart and its former SG.; Denied having any intention for the presidency in March 2012.; Expressed interest on 2 July 2014.; Declared candidacy on 7 June 2015 (video); Links: Website, Twitter, Facebook, (Q&A Book)
Samuel Sitta	Born 1942 (age 72), Urambo, Tabora Region; Alma mater: University of Dar es Salaam (LL.B), IMEDE (AdvDip); Member of Parliament for Urambo East (2005–present); Minister of Transport (2015–present)	Claims that he refused accepting a bribe of $70,000 from a Canadian aircraft manufacturer.; Expressed interest on 2 September 2014; Declared on 3 June 2015 (video)
Hamisi Kigwangalla	Born 1975 (age 39), Tabora Region; Alma mater: Muhimbili University (M.D.), Karolinska Institutet (MPH), BTH (MBA); Member of Parliament for Nzega (2010–present)	Declared candidacy on 7 September 2014 (speech, video); Campaign slogan: The New Tanzania We Want; Links: Website, Twitter
Stephen Wasira	Born 1945 (age 70), Bunda, Mara Region; Alma mater: American University (BA), (MA), (MPA); Member of Parliament for Bunda (2005–present); Minister of Agriculture (2015–present)	Expressed interest in September 2014; Declared candidacy on 31 May 2015 (video); Links: Website, Twitter
Mizengo Pinda	Born 1948 (age 66), Rukwa Region; Alma mater: University of Dar es Salaam (LL.B); Member of Parliament for Katavi (2000–present); Prime Minister (2008–present); Was pressured to resign following the Tegeta escrow scandal ($120m)	Expressed interest on 21 October 2014; Declared candidacy on 12 June 2015; Links: Profile
Lazaro Nyalandu	Born 1970 (age 44), Singida Region; Alma mater: Waldorf College (BA), Wartburg College (BA), Buckingham (MA); Member of Parliament for Singida North (2000–present); Minister of Natural Resources and Tourism (2014–present)	Declared candidacy on 28 December 2014; Links: Website, Twitter, Facebook
Bernard Membe	Born 1953 (age 61), Lindi Region; Alma mater: University of Dar es Salaam (BA), Johns Hopkins University (MA); Member of Parliament for Mtama (2000–present); Minister of Foreign Affairs (2007–present)	Expressed interest on 24 May 2015; Declared candidacy on 7 June 2015 (video); Denied reports that President Kikwete was his half-brother.; Endorsed by Seif Ali Iddi, Cleopa Msuya; Links: Twitter
Edward Lowassa	Born 1953 (age 61), Arusha Region; Alma mater: University of Dar es Salaam (BA), University of Bath (MSc); Member of Parliament for Monduli (1995–present); Former Prime Minister (2005–2008); Resigned after being implicated in an energy scandal (TSh 172 billion)	Declared candidacy on 30 May 2015 (speech, video); Campaign slogan: Safari ya Matumaini (Journey of Hope); Endorsed by Kingunge Ngombale–Mwiru; Links: Facebook
Mwigulu Nchemba	Born 1975 (age 40), Singida Region; Alma mater: University of Dar es Salaam (BA), (MA); Member of Parliament for Iramba West (2010–present); Deputy Minister of Finance (2014–present)	Declared candidacy on 31 May 2015 (video); Links: Twitter
Ali Karume	Born ?; Alma mater: ?; Retired Diplomat	Declared candidacy on 1 June 2015
Luhaga Mpina	Born 1975 (age 40); Alma mater: Mzumbe University (B.Acc), University of Strathclyde (MSc); Member of Parliament for Kisesa (2005–present)	Declared candidacy on 1 June 2015
Makongoro Nyerere	Born 1959 (age 56), Mara Region; Alma mater: Tanzania Military Academy, University of Aberdeen; Retired Army Officer and MP for Arusha Urban (1995–1997); Member of the East African Legislative Assembly (2012–present)	Son of Julius Nyerere, Tanzania's first President; Declared candidacy on 1 June 2015 (video)
Mark Mwandosya	Born 1949 (age 65), Mbeya Region; Alma mater: Aston University (BSc), University of Birmingham (PhD); Member of Parliament for Rungwe East (2000–present); State Minister (w/o Portfolio) (2012–present)	Declared candidacy on 1 June 2015 (speech, video)
Frederick Sumaye	Born 1950 (age 65), Arusha Region; Alma mater: Egerton Agricultural College (Dip), Harvard Kennedy School (MPA); Former Member of Parliament for Hanang; Former Prime Minister (1995–2005)	Declared candidacy on 2 June 2015 (video)
Sospeter Muhongo	Born 1954 (age 61), Mara Region; Alma mater: UDSM (BSc), University of Göttingen (MSc), TU Berlin (Dr.rer.nat.); Nominated Member of Parliament (2012–present); Minister of Energy and Minerals (2012–2015); Resigned as Minister following the Tegeta escrow scandal ($120m)	Declared candidacy on 2 June 2015 (video); Links: Profile
Titus Kamani	Born 1957 (age 57); Alma mater: Sokoine (BSc), Reading (MSc), Mweka College (PGDip); Member of Parliament for Busega (2010–present); Minister of Livestock and Fisheries Development (2014–present)	Declared candidacy on 2 June 2015
Amina Salum Ali	Born 1956 (age 58), Zanzibar; Alma mater: University of Delhi (BA), University of Pune (MBA); African Union Ambassador to the United States (2007–present)	Declared candidacy on 3 June 2015; Links: Facebook
John Magufuli	Born 1956 (age 55); Alma mater: University of Dar es Salaam (BSc), (MSc), (PhD); Member of Parliament for Chato (2000–present); Minister of Works (2010–present)	Declared candidacy on 3 June 2015 (video)
| Mohamed Bilal	Born 1945 (age 70), Unguja, Zanzibar; Alma mater: Howard University, UC Berkeley (M.A.), (Ph.D); Vice President (2010–present)	Declared candidacy on 3 June 2015
William Ngeleja	Born 1967 (age 47); Alma mater: University of Dar es Salaam (LL.B), (LL.M); Member of Parliament for Sengerema (2010–present); Minister of Energy and Minerals (2008–2012); Sacked by President Kikwete in May 2012	Declared candidacy on 4 June 2015 (video); Links: Twitter
Mwele Ntuli Malecela	Born: 1963; Alma mater: UDSM (BSc), London School of Hygiene & Tropical Medicine (PhD); Director General of the National Institute for Medical Research (NIMR)	Daughter of former Prime Minister John Malecela.; Declared candidacy on 7 June 2015; Links: Twitter
Augustine Mahiga	Born 1945 (age 69); Alma mater: University of Dar es Salaam (BA), UToronto (MA), (PhD); Permanent Representative of Tanzania to the U.N. (2003–2010); United Nations Special Envoy for Somalia (2010–2013)	Stated that he was nominated for the Nobel Peace Prize.; Declared candidacy on 9 June 2015 (video)
Hassy Kitine	Born 1943 (age 72); Alma mater: UDSM (BA), (MA), Lakehead University (MA), Simon Fraser (PhD); Former Director General of Tanzania Intelligence and Security Service (TISS); Member of Parliament for Makete (2000–2005)	Declared candidacy on 10 June 2015
Monica Mbega	Born 1956 (age 59); Alma mater: Institute of Accountancy Arusha (CPA), Salford University (MA); Member of Parliament for Iringa Urban (2000–2010); Former Deputy Minister of Finance	Declared candidacy on 11 June 2015
Asha-Rose Migiro	Born 1956 (age 59); Alma mater: UDSM (LL.B), LL.M), University of Konstanz (Dr. iur.); Former Deputy Secretary-General of the United Nations (2007–2012); Minister of Justice and Constitution Affairs (2014–present)	Declared candidacy on 15 June 2015; Links: (Twitter)
Augustino Ramadhani	Born 1945 (age 69), Unguja, Zanzibar; Alma mater: University of Dar es Salaam (LL.B); Retired Brigadier General and former Chief Justice (2007–2010); President of the African Court on Human and Peoples' Rights (2010–present); Anglican Church pastor	Declared candidacy on 17 June 2015
H. Mwakyembe	Born 1955 (age 59); Alma mater: UDSM (LL.B), (LL.M), University of Hamburg (LL.M), (Dr. jur.); Member of Parliament for Kyela (2005–present); Minister of East African Cooperation (2015–present)	Denied having interest in January 2015; Declared candidacy on 19 June 2015

=== Other candidates ===
Candidate	Age	Background	Declared on
Maliki Malupu	34	Postgraduate student at Mzumbe University	1 June 2015.
Amos Siyantemi			4 June 2015
Godwin Mwapongo	43	High Court Advocate	6 June 2015
Peter Nyalali		Former soldier	7 June 2015
Leonce Mulenda			7 June 2015
Eldoforce Bilohe	43	Farmer	9 June 2015
Boniface Ndego			10 June 2015
Athuman Mwariko	c. 66	Painter, sculptor and cultural scientist. Designed the Tanzanian Coat of arms	12 June 2015
Muzzammil Kalokola		Alma mater: University of Nairobi; Chairperson of Mwalimu Nyerere Ideology Conservation Society	13 June 2015
Joseph Chagama			15 June 2015
Patrick Chokala		Former diplomat and Press Secretary to presidents Mwinyi and Mkapa	18 June 2015
Ritha Ngowi	50	Community Development Officer	22 June 2015
Helena Elinawinga	41	Alma mater: School of International Service	25 June 2015
Antony Chalamila	66		27 June 2015
Amos Robert			

=== Potential candidates ===
- Anna Tibaijuka, former Lands Minister. Her prospects were diminished when she was sacked by the President after receiving $1 million from a businessman. Tibaijuka denied any wrongdoing and said that she accepted the money as a donation for a school.
- Anne Makinda, Speaker
- Hussein Mwinyi, Defence Minister

=== Declined to run ===
- Salim Ahmed Salim, former Prime Minister
- Joseph Warioba, former Prime Minister

== Nomination process ==
The nomination forms cost a non-refundable TSh 1 million (US$500). A total of 42 party members collected the forms from 3 June but only 38 managed to return them by the 2 July deadline. The four disqualified aspirants were Anthony Chalamila, Helena Elinewinga, Muzammil Kalokola and Peter Nyalile. Each candidate was required to solicit sponsorship from at least 450 party members from a minimum of 15 regions (including three regions from Zanzibar). Lowassa's campaign team claims to have gained sponsorship from more than 800,000 party members from all the regions.

The meetings will take place in Dodoma at the party's headquarters and at the newly inaugurated Dodoma Convention Centre. More than 10,000 delegates and their retinues were expected to arrive in the capital.

=== Central Committee ===
On 11 July 2015 at 01:20 EAT (UTC +3), the party tweeted the names of the five candidates selected by its Central Committee from the list of 38 aspirants:

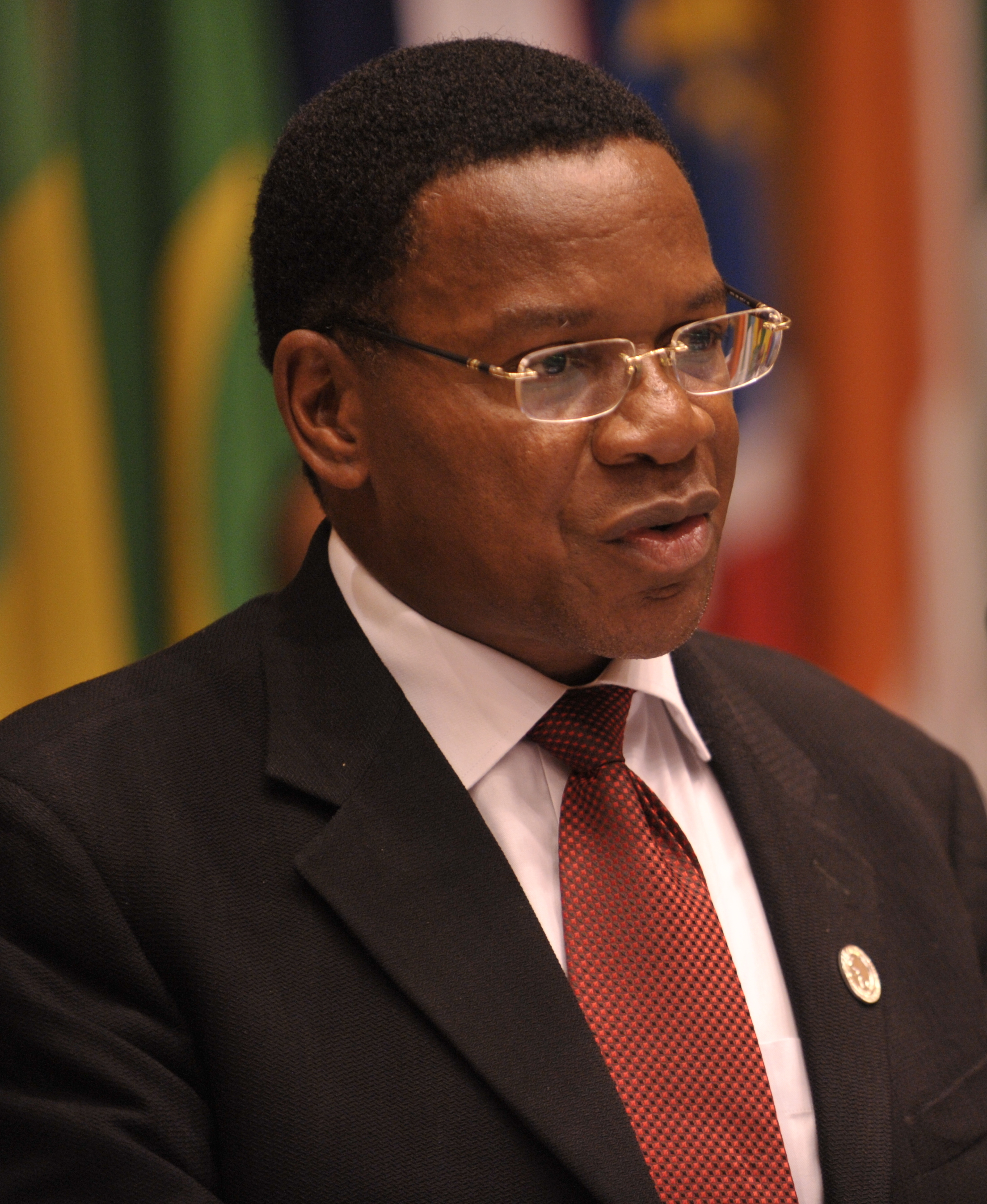
Bernard Membe (61)
Foreign Minister

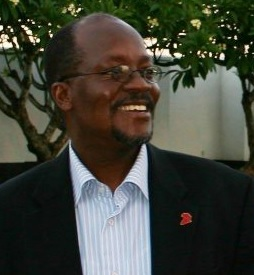
John Magufuli (55)
Works Minister

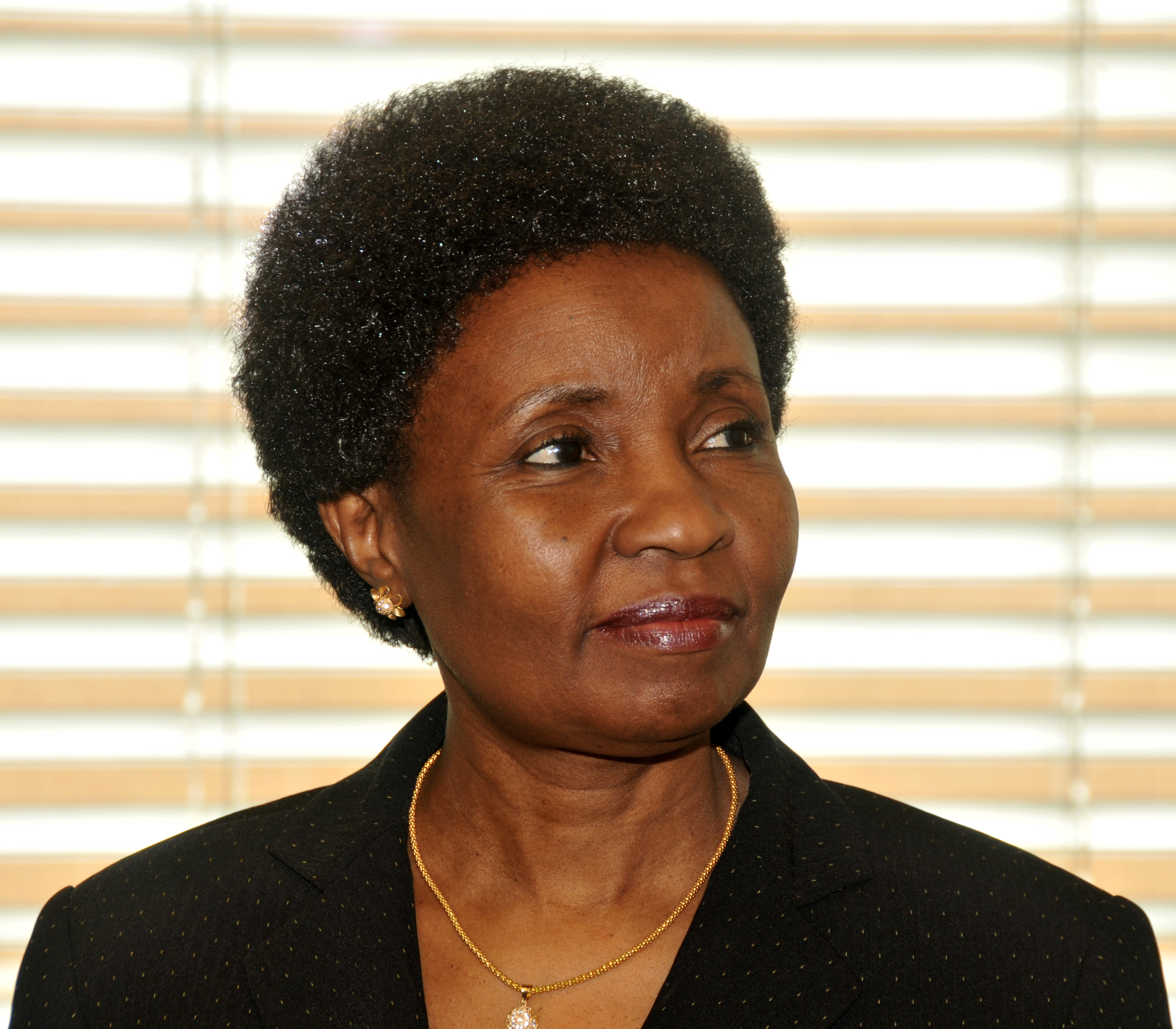
Asha-Rose Migiro (59)
Justice Minister

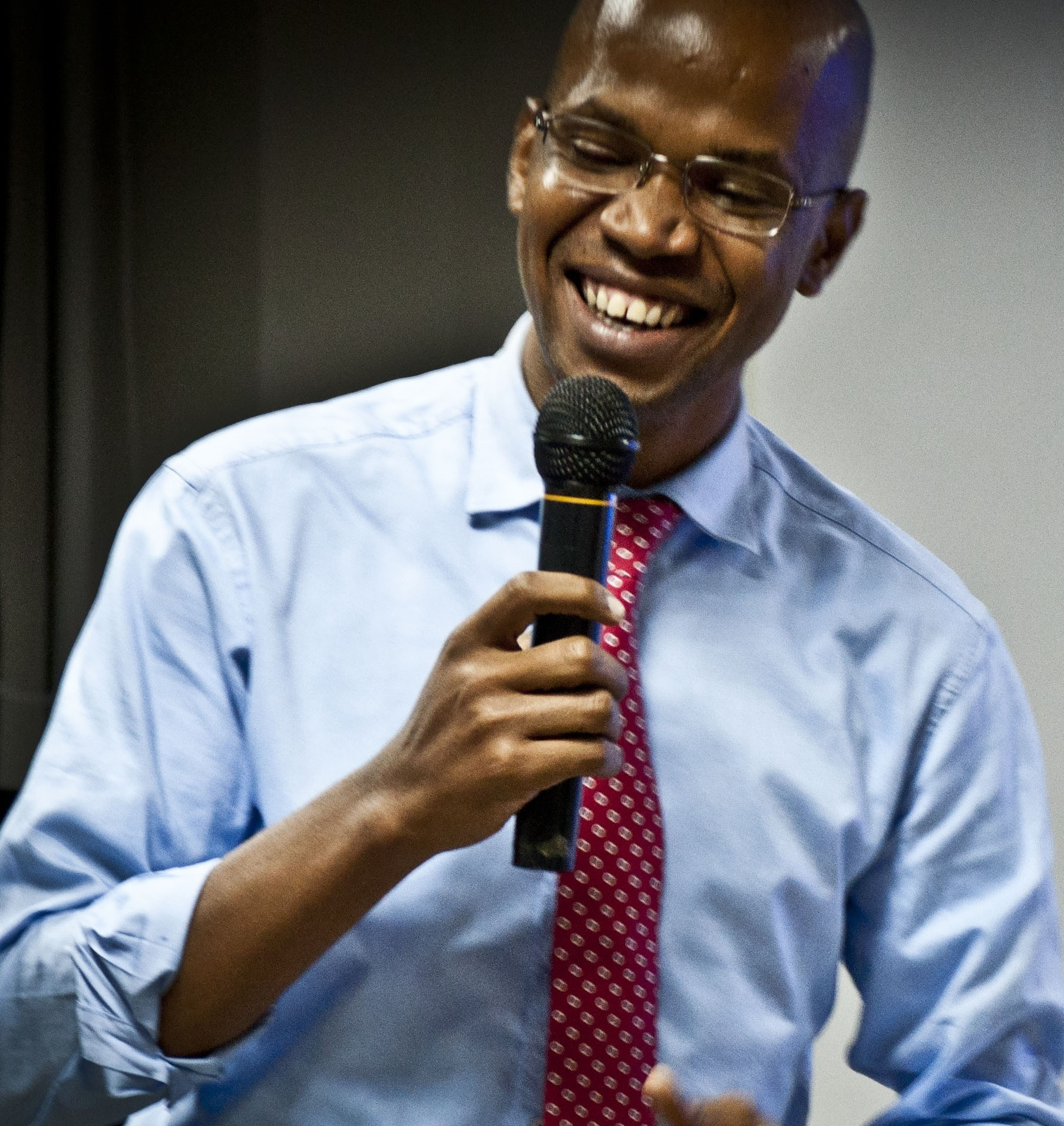
January Makamba (41)
Deputy Minister

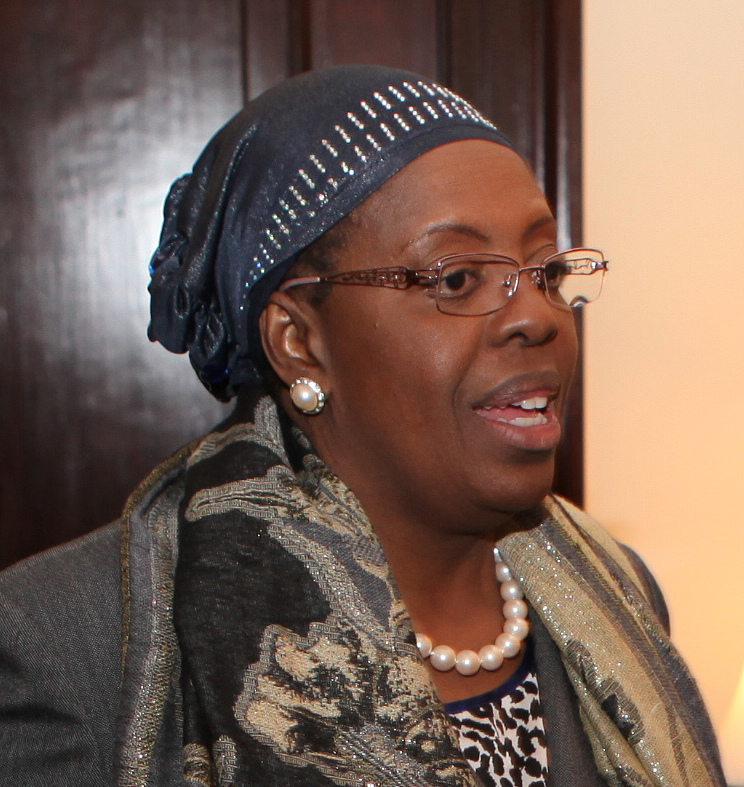
Amina Salum Ali (58)
AU Ambassador to the U.S.

=== National Executive Committee ===
On 11 July, the National Executive Committee selected the three finalists:

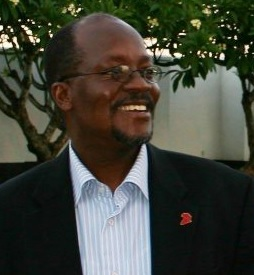
John Magufuli (55)
Works Minister

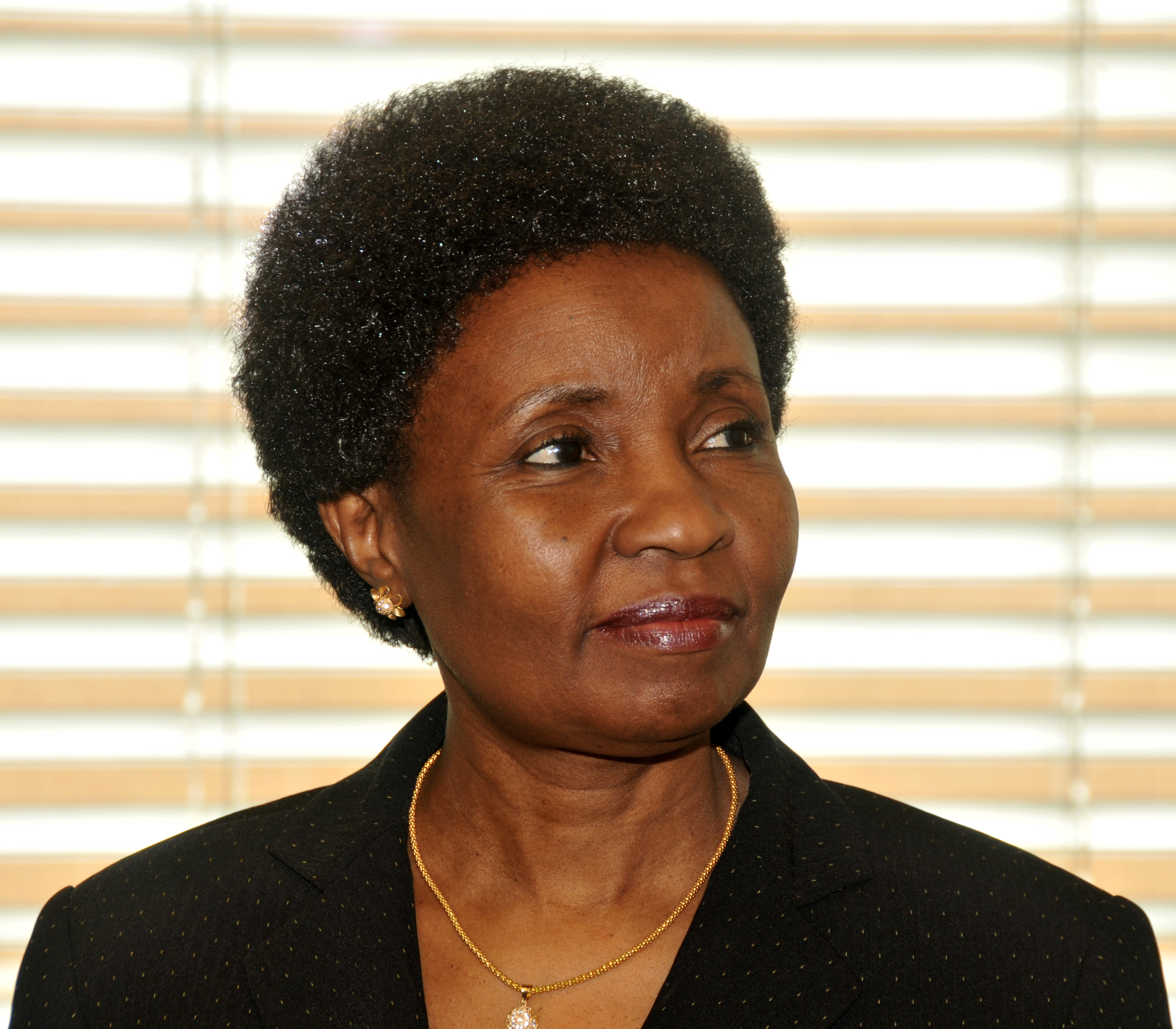
Asha-Rose Migiro (59)
Justice Minister

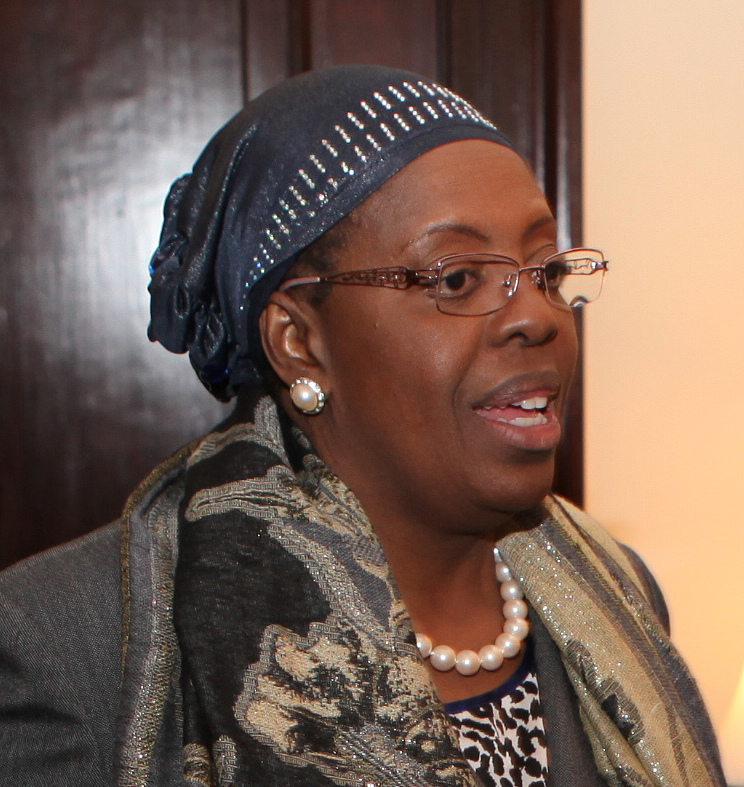
Amina Salum Ali (58)
AU Ambassador to the U.S.

=== National Congress ===
The party's National Congress selected Works Minister John Magufuli as the party's 2015 presidential nominee.

== Opinion polls ==
Poll source	Date	Sample size	Undecided	Lowassa	Pinda	Membe	Sitta	Magufuli	Nchemba	Makamba	Mwandosya
Twaweza	September 2014	1,445	33%	13.0%	12.0%	5.0%	4.0%	3.0%	–	–	–
Positive Thinkers	March 2015	3,298	2.4%	22.8%	3.2%	5.9%	2.2%	6.8%	10.6%	1.6%	1.2%
Samunge S.S. Research Center	2013–2015	7,000	–	20.7%	2.4%	7.0%	–	7.6%	–	4.8%	–
REDET	23–26 June 2015	1,250	–	27.0%	7.2%	8.2%	0.6%	6.6%	1.0%	0.8%	3.1%

At the party's 8th National Congress in 2012, the following four aspirants were the favourites among the NEC delegates and were elected by them: Wasira (89%), Makamba (87%), Nchemba (84%) and Membe (61%).

== Post-nomination events ==
=== Defections ===
- Both former prime ministers Edward Lowassa and Frederick Sumaye defected to the opposition Chadema party after front-runner candidate Lowassa was not selected. Lowassa was then chosen as Chadema's presidential candidate and got 39.97% of the vote; the highest in opposition history. However, both later on re-joined CCM in 2019.

=== Expulsions ===
- In 2020, Bernard Membe was expelled from the party. He re-joined CCM in 2022.

=== Deaths ===
Caandidate	Date	Notes
Samuel Sitta	7 November 2016	Died in Germany where he was undergoing treatment.
Augustino Ramadhani	28 April 2020	Died at Aga Khan Hospital, Dar es Salaam after a long illness.
Augustine Mahiga	1 May 2020	Died in Dodoma.
John Magufuli	17 March 2021	Died at Mzena Hospital in Dar es Salaam from a heart condition.
Mwele Ntuli Malecela	10 February 2022	Died in Geneva, Switzerland.
Bernard Membe	12 May 2023	Died at Kairuki Hospital in Dar es Salaam.
Edward Lowassa	10 February 2024	Died at Jakaya Kikwete Cardiac Institute in Dar es Salaam.
