= Ally Sykes =

Personal details
- Born: 10 October 1926 Dar es Salaam, Tanganyika
- Died: 19 May 2013 (aged 86) Nairobi, Kenya
- Resting place: Kisutu Cemetery, Dar es Salaam
- Other political affiliations: Tanganyika African National Union
- Relations: Kleist Sykes (father)

Ally Kleist Sykes (10 October 1926 – 19 May 2013) was a veteran Tanzanian politician and one of the 17 founders of the Tanganyika African National Union.

== Early life and career ==
Ally was born on 10 October 1926 in Dar es Salaam to Kleist Sykes during the British rule of Tanganyika.

He served in the King's African Rifles during World War II .

== Personal life ==
He had two brothers Abulwahid and Abbas. He served as a trustee of the Tanzanian Premier League club Simba S.C.

== Death and funeral ==
He died of heart failure on 19 May 2013 at the Aga Khan Hospital in Nairobi, Kenya and was buried the next day at the Kisutu Cemetery in Dar es Salaam. His funeral was attended by President Jakaya Kikwete, former presidents Ali Hassan Mwinyi and Benjamin Mkapa, CCM senior officials Philip Mangula and Abdulrahman Kinana.
