= Daniel Chongolo =

Tanzanian politician (born 1978)

Minister of Agriculture
- In office 30 April 2021 – 29 November 2023
- Chairperson: Samia Suluhu
- Preceded by: Hussein Bashe

Personal details
- Born: 2 December 1978 (age 47) Mufindi, Iringa Region
- Citizenship: Tanzanian
- Party: Chama Cha Mapinduzi
- Education: Mzumbe University (MPA)

Daniel Godfrey Chongolo is a Tanzanian politician and the Minister for Agriculture. He was also the Previous Secretary General of Chama Cha Mapinduzi political party in Tanzania, appointed by Samia Suluhu into office on April 30, 2021. Before his appointment, he was a civil servant in Kinondoni District as District Commissioner in Dar es Salaam, and also served as a Commissioner in Longido District, Arusha Region.

== Education ==
In 2013, Daniel Chongolo graduated from Open University of Tanzania receiving his bachelor's degree in mass communication then Mzumbe University where he graduated Master's in Public Administration and Management

== Political career ==
Before his appointment, Chongolo had served in the party as a Director to a Department of Mass communication under the Department of Ideology and Publicity at CCM party Headquarters in Dodoma. During the post 2025 election reshuffle he was made Minister of Agriculture.

== See also ==
- Bashiru Ally – Tanzanian academic and politician
- Abdulrahman Kinana – Tanzanian politician
- Yusuf Makamba – Tanzanian CCM politician and military officer
- Wilson Mukama – Tanzanian CCM politician

Party political offices
Preceded by Bashiru Ally	Chama Cha Mapinduzi Secretary General; 2021–present	Incumbent
