= Habib Kambanga =

High commissioner of Tanzania to Rwanda

His Excellency Habib Gallus Kambanga
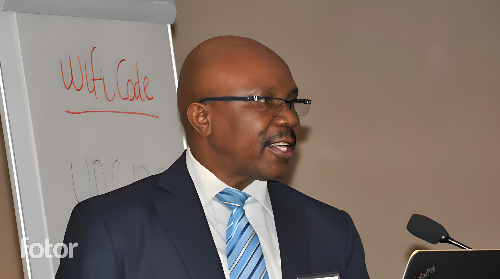
- Kambanga in 2017 during a SADC workshop on counter-terrorism in Tanzania

High Commissioner of Tanzania in Rwanda
- Incumbent
- Assumed office 13/02/2025
- Appointed by: Samia Suluhu Hassan
- President: Paul Kagame

Deputy Director of Tanzania Intelligence and Security Service
- In office December 2023 – 23 June 2024
- Appointed by: Samia Suluhu Hassan
- President: Samia Suluhu Hassan
- Prime Minister: Kassim Majaliwa
- Vice President: Philip Mpango

Head of Regional Early Waring Center of the Southern African Development Community
- In office November 2014 – December 2023
- Appointed by: Stergomena Tax

Personal details
- Born: 4 April 1968 (age 58) Tandahimba, Mtwara; Tanzania
- Spouse: Francisca Alex Kambanga (m.1999)
- Children: 4
- Education: University of Aberdeen (PostGraduate); Osmania University (Undergraduate); Open University of Tanzania (Ph.D)

Habib Gallus Kambanga (/hɑˈbiːb ˈɡæl.əs kæmˈbæŋ.ɡə/, Hah-beeb Gal-luhs Kam-bahn-gah; born 4 April 1968) is a Tanzanian high commissioner who has been serving as a high commissioner for Tanzania in Rwanda since 21 May 2025. Before being appointed as a new ambassador, he was the deputy director general of Tanzanian Intelligence and Security Service (TISS).

== Biography ==
=== Early life and education ===
Kambanga was born in Tanzania on 4 April 1968 in Mtwara Region to two agriculturalists. He completed his secondary education in 1990. The following year he went on to serve in the Tanzanian Military Service. He went on to achieve his Bachelor of Arts In Political Science at Osmania University in Hyberabad, India from 1995-1998. He went on to complete his postgraduate degree on Strategic Studies at University of Aberdeen in Scotland in 2004.

Kambanga has also pursued many different courses that are based on counter-terrorism. He was awarded certificate on Threat Analysis and Counter Surveillance in Virginia, USA. In the December of 2023, he graduated from the Open University Of Tanzania (OUT) with a Doctor of Philosophy (Ph.D) in Political Science.

=== Career ===
From 1992 to 2000, Kambanga worked at the Tanzanian Intelligence and Security Service (TISS) as a desk officer and analyst located in Dar es Salaam, Tanzania. The following year he was promoted to become the policy analyst of TISS and for the next 5 years he worked as the deputy head of secretariat of the Directorate of Internal Operations of TISS. In 1998 to 1999, Kambanga was chosen as the team leader from Tanzanian Intelligence and Security Service to work on the Al-Qaeda terrorist bombings on the United States embassy in Dar es Salaam, Tanzania from August 1998 - May 1999.

In 2007, Kambanga and his family relocated to Gaborone, Botswana to work at the Southern African Development Community (SADC) Secretariat at the newly established Regional Early Warning Center as their Senior Analyst of Political and Security Threats. For the next 7 years under the Executive Secretaries Tomaz Salomão (2007–2013) and Stergomena Tax (2013–2014) In 2014, He was appointed as the new head of the Regional Early Warning Center (REWC) of the Southern African Development Community (SADC) under Stergomena Tax (2014–2021) and Elias Mpedi Magosi (2021–2022).

In 2021, he had made various statements with the SADC and United Nations about political security with the Southern parts of Africa.

In 2023, Kambanga made the decision to leave the Southern African Development Community (SADC) to return to Tanzania after serving almost 16 years in Botswana. When he returned, he was appointed by the president Samia Suluhu Hassan to become the deputy director general of Tanzanian Intelligence and Security Service (TISS) in the December of 2023. On 15 June 2024, he was appointed to become an ambassador. After 8 days, he was sworn in by Samia Suluhu Hassan on 23 June 2024.

On 13 February 2025, Kambanga was chosen to become the high commissioner of Tanzania in Rwanda by the president, and he was done a ceremony by the president of Rwanda, Paul Kagame on 21 May 2025

=== Personal life ===
In 1999, Kambanga married to a Tanzanian teacher and went on to have 4 children, 3 boys and 1 girl.

=== External links ===
- Habib Kambanga's message to the high commission
