= Amina Salum Ali =

Tanzanian politician

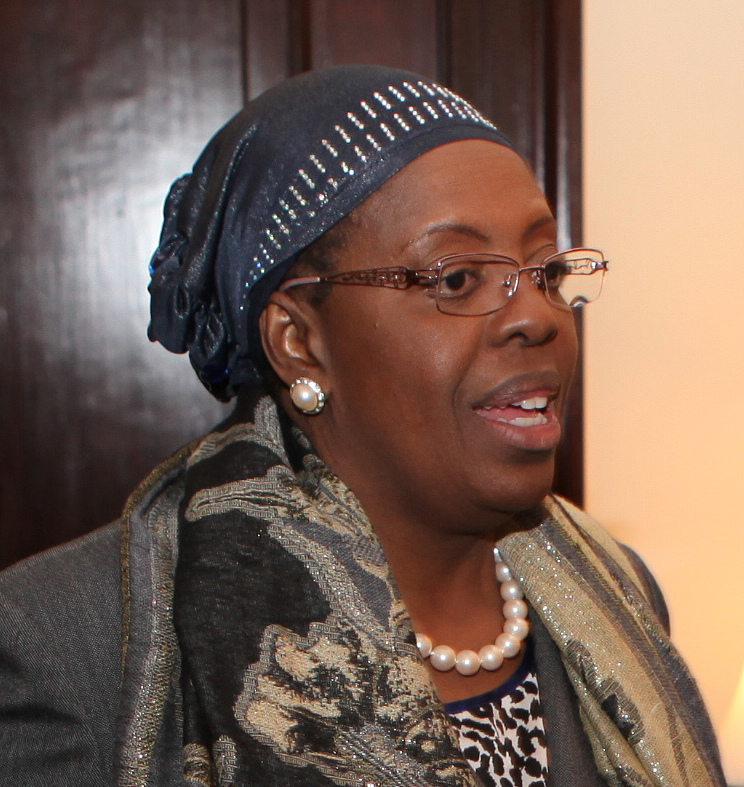

African Union Ambassador to the United States
- Incumbent
- Assumed office 26 July 2007

Minister of Finance (Zanzibar)
- In office 1990–2000
- President: Salmin Amour

Personal details
- Born: 24 October 1956 (age 69) Sultanate of Zanzibar
- Party: CCM (1977–); Afro-Shirazi Party (1968–77)
- Education: University of Delhi (BA); University of Pune (MBA)
- Website: www.aminasali.com

Amina Salum Ali (born 24 October 1956) is a Tanzanian politician. She is the African Union former Ambassador to the United States since 2007. Succeeded by Arikana Chihombori Quao who became the second African Union Ambassador to the United States of America in 2017. Now, in 2016 she was appointed the Minister of Trade, Industry and Marketing, in the Zanzibar Government.

== Early life ==
She was educated at Lumumba Secondary School. She studied economics at the University of Delhi. She also has an MBA in marketing from the University of Pune.

== Political career ==
In June 2015, she declared her candidacy for the presidency in the 2015 election.
