= Malecela =

Malecela is a Tanzanian surname. Notable people with the surname include:

- Anne Malecela (born 1956), Tanzanian politician, wife of John
- John Malecela (born 1934), Prime Minister of Tanzania
- Mwele Ntuli Malecela (born 1963), Tanzanian politician and administrator
