= Ahmed Hassan Diria =

Tanzania Politician

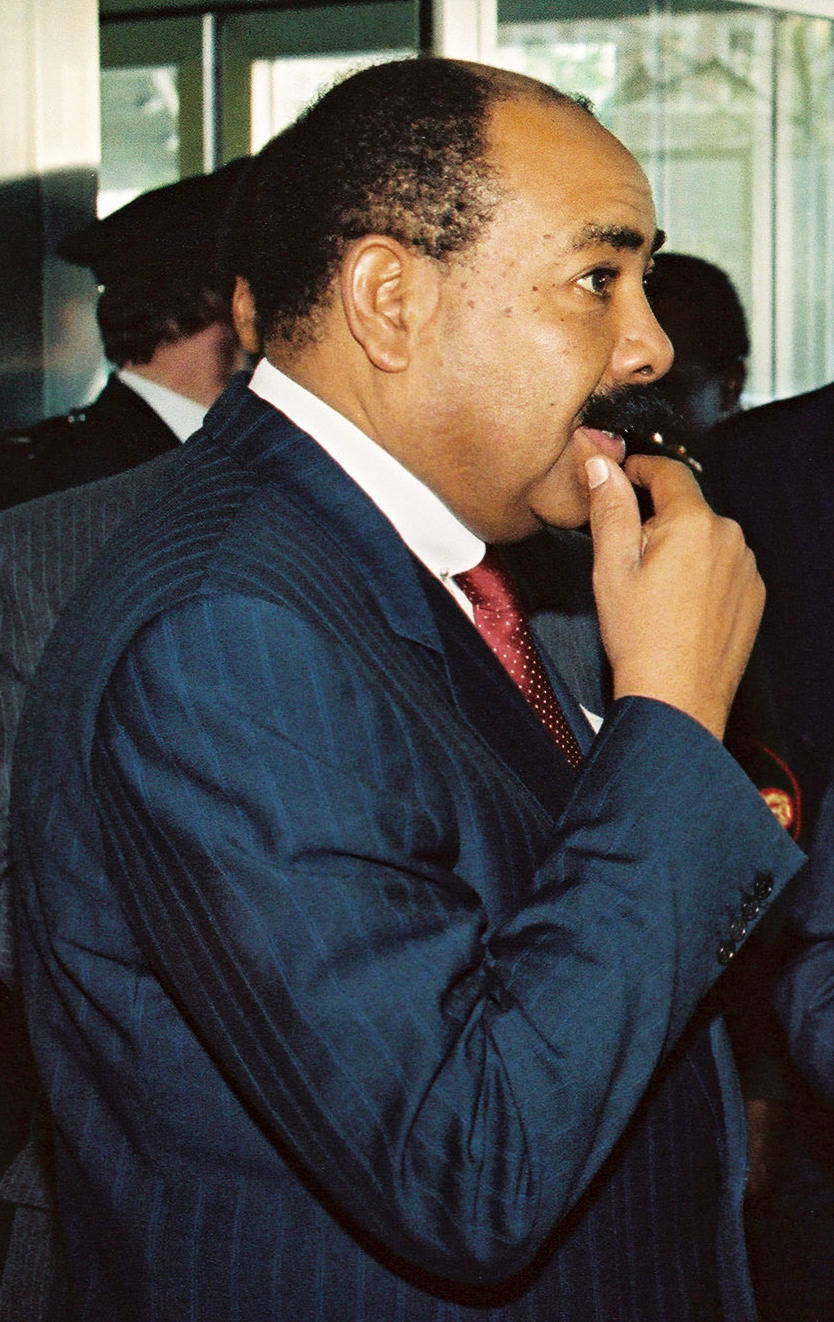

9th Minister of Foreign Affairs
- In office 1991–1992
- President: Ali Hassan Mwinyi
- Preceded by: Benjamin Mkapa
- Succeeded by: Joseph Rwegasira

Personal details
- Born: July 13, 1937 Sultanate of Zanzibar
- Died: March 13, 2005 (aged 67) Germany
- Party: CCM
- Spouse: Sakina Mouhsin Hassan
- Children: Laila Ahmed Hassan Diria Samira Ahmed Hassan Diria Thauriya Ahmed Hassan Diria Zeinab Ahmed Hassan Diria

Ahmed Hassan Diria (July 13, 1937 – March 13, 2005) was a Somali Tanzanian politician and diplomat. He was born in Raha Leo, Zanzibar and was educated in local primary and secondary schools. He started working in government service in 1954, with a three-year period of study at the College of Philosophy in Ghana.

Following the Zanzibar Revolution of 1964, he was appointed the area commissioner for Pemba. He remained in this position until 1965, when he joined the Tanzanian foreign service.

He was the ambassador to Congo from 1970 to 1972; the high commissioner of New Delhi, India from 1971 to 1978; the ambassador to Japan from 1979 to 1984; and the ambassador to Germany in 1984.

After his foreign service, he moved back to Tanzania to become a member of parliament and held various positions as minister.

In 1989 he joined the Tanzanian cabinet, serving as minister of information and broadcasting from 1989 to 1994, and foreign minister from 1990 to 1993. Meanwhile, he was elected to Parliament from Raha Leo and served in Parliament until his death. He died in a hospital in Germany.

Political offices
Preceded by Benjamin William Mkapa	Minister of Foreign Affairs and International Cooperation; 1990-1993	Succeeded by Joseph Rwegasira
