= Susan Kolimba =

Tanzanian academic and politician

Dr. Susan Kolimba MP
- Incumbent
- Assumed office December 2015
- President: John Magufuli

Member of Parliament
- Incumbent
- Assumed office 2015
- Constituency: Special Seats

Personal details
- Born: 8 December 1964 (age 61) Ludewa District, Njombe Region, Tanzania
- Party: CCM
- Parent: Horace Kolimba (father)
- Education: Peoples' Friendship University of Russia, Open University of Tanzania

Dr. Susan Kolimba (born 8 December 1964) is a Tanzanian academic and politician belonging to the ruling Chama Cha Mapinduzi (CCM) party. She served as Deputy Minister of Foreign Affairs and East African Cooperation up to September 26, 2018. She is a one-term Member of Parliament having been appointed to a special seat reserved for women.

== Background and education ==
Susan Kolimba was born on 8 December 1964. She completed her schooling from the Kibosho Girls Secondary School in 1982. Her first degree was a diploma in teaching, which she received in 1988 from Marangu Teachers Training College. After teaching at Pugu Secondary school secondary for three year she then embarked on a career in law. She received her LL.B, LL.M and PhD in law in 1996, 1998 and 2002 respectively, all from the Peoples' Friendship University of Russia. She taught law as a lecturer at the Open University of Tanzania between 2005 and 2016. She became the Dean of the Faculty of Law in 2010 up to 2018.

== Political career ==
Dr. Kolimba became involved with CCM in 2007 and has served in a number of party roles including in the party's women's wing. She was elected to a seat in the Tanzanian Parliament in 2015 to a seat reserved for women up to 2020.

Kolimba was appointed Deputy Minister in the Ministry for Foreign Affairs and East African Cooperation in the newly elected President John Magufuli's government after the 2015 elections. She serves under cabinet Minister Dr. Augustine Mahiga. As the minister responsible for East African cooperation, Dr. Kolimba was sworn in as an ex-officio member of the East African Legislative Assembly. She also assumed the duty of Chair of the East African Community Council of Ministers. Currently East Africa Regional Executive Secretary Pan African Women Organization (PAWO).
