= Horace Kolimba =

Tanzanian politician

CCM Secretary General
- In office 1990–1995
- Preceded by: Rashidi Kawawa
- Succeeded by: Lawrence Gama

Personal details
- Born: 29 December 1939 Ludewa District, Njombe Region, Tanganyika Territory
- Died: 13 March 1994 (aged 54) Dodoma, Tanzania
- Resting place: Manda, Ludewa District
- Party: CCM
- Children: Susan Kolimba

Horace Kolimba (29 December 1939 – 13 March 1997) was a Tanzanian CCM politician.

Kolimba was born on 29 December 1939 in Manda-Nsungu Village, and he took his secondary education at Chidya Secondary School in Masasi District and Minaki High School before joining university education for Bachelor of Law degree (LL. B) at the University of Dar-es - Salaam. Kolimba was a professional lawyer who was one the first of 14 Tanzanians to study law at the University of Dar es Salaam.

After University studies, Kolimba joined the government services of the Ministry of Justice and later joined the International Labour Organization (ILO) as an International Expert in Geneva, Switzerland. On his return to Tanzania, at the request of the Minister of Communication and Works Job Marecela Lusinde, Kolimba was appointed as Senior Labour Officer in the then Department of Labour. President Julius Nyerere appointed Kolimba as District Development Director of the Moshi District and then as Regional Development Director of the Iringa Region, where he worked with Mohamed Kissoky as a Regional Commissioner. Kolimba was appointed by Nyerere in 1976 as Principal Secretary of the Ministry of Public Service (Central Establishment). He worked as principal secretary in the Prime Minister's office when Edward Sokoine was prime minister for the first time. Then, he worked as Principal Secretary for the Ministry of Labour and Social Welfare with Alfred Tandau as a Minister. Kolimba was elected chairman of the Tanzania Workers Union - JUWATA. He was an instrument of the Human Resource Deployment Act No 6 of 13 March 1997. The Act established a machinery design to regulate and facilitate the engagement of all non-disabled persons in productive work and connected matters.

When Sokoine became the Prime Minister of the United Republic of Tanzania for the second time, Nyerere appointed Kolimba Special Advisor to the Prime Minister. After the death of Sokoine on 12 April 1984, Kolimba continued with his responsibility under the Prime Minister Salim Ahmed Salim. Nyerere appointed Kolimba as Regional Commissioner of Kagera- Bukoba. Then, he transferred to Cost Region Kibaha due to his role in the Trade Union. In 1993 Kolimba was elected Chama cha Mapinduzi (CCM) Secretary General, taking over from Rashidi Kawawa.During his tenure as CCM Secretary General, President Ali Hassan Mwinyi appointed him Minister for Planning in 1995. Kolimba also served as a Member of Parliament for the Ludewa constituency.

== Personal life ==
Kolimba was married to Mama Philomena; together they had four children.

Kolimba died on 13 March 1997. He was interred in his home place, Nsungu Manda along Lake Nyasa in Ludewa District.
