= Joseph Rwegasira =

Tanzanian politician and diplomat

Minister of Foreign Affairs
- In office 1993–1995
- President: Ali Hassan Mwinyi
- Preceded by: Ahmed Hassan Diria
- Succeeded by: Jakaya Kikwete

Personal details
- Born: March 21, 1935
- Died: March 4, 2016 (aged 80) Dar es Salaam, Tanzania

Joseph Clemence Rwegasira (March 21, 1935 – March 4, 2016) was a Tanzanian politician and diplomat. Rwegasira, a former member of the National Assembly for Nkenge Constituency(1985-1995), served as Minister of Foreign Affairs from 1993 to 1995. He also held the government portfolios of Minister for Trade and Industry(1989-1990) and Minister for Labour and Youth Development at various times during his political career(1990-1993). He had also served as a Regional Commissioner for Dar es Salaam at one time(1975-1976).

Rwegasira had served as Tanzania's Ambassador to neighboring Zambia (1979-1982).

Rwegasira died at Muhimbili National Hospital (MNH) in Dar es Salaam, Tanzania, on March 4, 2016, at the age of 80. He was buried in his home village of Bugombe-Kanyigo, Misenyi District, Kagera Region, on March 8, 2016.
