= Kleist Sykes =

- Born: Sykes Mbuwane; 1894; Pangani, German East Africa
- Died: 1949 (aged 54–55)
- Movement: Tanganyika African Association
- Children: Ally Sykes, Abdulwahid Sykes, Abbas Sykes

Kleist Sykes (1894 – 1949) was a Tanganyikan (presently Tanzania) political activist. He helped form the Tanganyika African Association.

Sykes was born in Pangani, Tanga Region, to Sykes Mbuwane, a Zulu mercenary hired by the German Empire, and a Nyaturu mother. After his father's death, Sykes moved with his godfather, Effendi Plantan, to Dar Es Salaam, and would later fight for the Germans in the First World War.

After the war, Sykes worked for the Tanganyika Railway. He met Dr. James Aggrey, a Ghanaian teacher, who inspired Sykes to form the Tanganyika African Association (AA) in 1929. This was along with friends including Mzee bin Sudi, Cecil Matola, Suleiman, Mjisu and Raikes Kusi. In the 1930s, AA members built the organization's headquarters at New Street, where the Tanganyika African National Union would later be created in 1954.

Sykes was the first African to join the Tanganyika Chamber of Commerce, and the second African to serve in colonial Dar es Salaam's Municipal Council.

Sykes had three sons, Abdulwahid, Ally, and Abbas, who would also have prominent careers in Tanzania.

== The Campaign against Abushiri bin Harith and Chief Mkwawa 1889 ==
Harmine von Wissman landed in Pangani at the turn of the 19th century with a mercenary force of Zulu warriors. The Zulu mercenaries were under the leadership of Chief Mohosh of Inhambane, Mozambique. They were recruited from a village named Kwa Likunyi in Mozambique. Among the mercenaries was my grandfather, Sykes Mbuwane. This was just after the Berlin Conference of 1884, in which Africa was partitioned between imperial powers in Europe. This caused resistance and from 1888 to 1889, the people of Tanganyika rose up in arms to defend their freedom. Germans had a military camp at Pangani, the small coastal town a few miles from Tanga which in those days was an important town in the German administration. It was from this German camp in Pangani that my grandfather and his fellow mercenaries under the command of Chief Mohosh and mobilised under von Wissman prepared themselves to go into action against the local population resisting German rule. The Germans had also recruited Nubian soldiers from Sudan who, together with the Zulu, fought against Abushiri bin Salim bin Harith for almost two years.

Harmine von Wissman was an explorer and soldier. He led the suppression of the resistance of 1888–1889 and was made Governor of German East Africa (1895–1896). Wissman, with the support of the Zulu warriors and the Nubians and in keeping with the agreement of the Berlin Conference, suppressed the resistance against German rule in Tanganyika led by Abushiri and Chief Mkwawa.

Abushiri was later captured and hanged in Pangani in December 1889. After Abushiri's defeat Germans were engaged in a war with Chief Mkwawa of the Wahehe from 1891 to 1894. In July 1894 Mkwawa rather than be captured, took his own life. Both Abushiri and Chief Mkwawa met their end fighting against foreign domination while my grandfather died as a mercenary soldier fulfilling his contractual obligation to his employer and paymaster, the Germans.

As fate would have it half a century after the death of Chief Mkwawa, his grandson, Chief Adam Sapi Mkwawa, and the grandson of Sykes Mbuwane, Abdulwahid Sykes, met at Kalenga in 1954. Kalenga was once the fort of Chief Mkwawa. In the presence of Dossa Aziz, Chief Mkwawa secretly enrolled as a member of the Tanganyika African National Union (TANU), the party of independence, which Abdulawahid, Julius Nyerere, John Rupia, other patriots and I had formed the same year with the aim of driving out the British from our country.

At that time there were two prominent families of South African Zulu origin in Dar es Salaam: Abdallah Kleist Sykes, formerly known as Kleist Plantan, and his distant relatives, the three Plantan brothers: Mwalimu Thomas Plantan, (the title Mwalimu given to him because he was a schoolteacher), Schneider Abdillah Plantan and Ramadhan Mashado Plantan.

Kleist Sykes was known as Kleist Plantan, after taking the name Plantan from Effendi Plantan, a relative who brought up our father after the death of his father Sykes Mbuwane. 'Effendi' was a military rank in the Turkish army, probably incorporated in the German forces during the First World War when Turkey and Germany were allies.

Kleist and Aziz Ali were good friends and got on well together. They were considered the African elite, and cultured townsmen of Dar es Salaam.

As indicated earlier Kleist Sykes was a chain smoker who loved his coffee. He would sit outside his house with his friends and order endless cups of coffee as it was sold by vendors making the rounds in Dar es Salaam. When he died of bronchitis on 23 May 1949 Dar es Salaam had never seen such a well-attended funeral.

Kleist Sykes had left his mark on the history of Dar es Salaam. He had founded the African Association which had propelled Africans into politics and he had also founded Al Jamiatul Islamiyya fi Tanganyika, the Muslim organisation which not only stood up against the threat of Christian missionaries, but laid the foundation for future organisation of Muslims as a political entity.

Kleist Sykes had also initiated a plan to build a school for Muslim children of Dar es Salaam so that Muslim children could get education without the fear of being converted to Christianity were they to be enrolled in missionary schools. He organized Muslims to contribute money for the school and this they did with relish.

Kleist Sykes also served on the Dar es Salaam Municipal Council, the second African to do so in colonial Tanganyika. He successfully ventured into business which was the monopoly and domain of Asians. He joined the Chamber of Commerce and was probably the first African to do so. The Chamber of Commerce was an important power lobby of the Asian business class. He did more than his share in the political development of Africans of Tanganyika. The death of Kleist Sykes signaled the end of an era and the emerging of a new one.
