= Tanzania Intelligence and Security Service =

National intelligence agency of Tanzania

Tanzania Intelligence and Security Service (TISS)
- Idara ya Usalama wa Taifa (Swahili)

Agency overview
- Formed: 1952; 74 years ago as Special Branch and TISS Act of Parliament 10/03/1998
- Preceding agencies: Special Branch (SB); Tanzania Intelligence Service (TSI) (Idara ya Usalama wa Taifa (Tanzania))
- Headquarters: Dodoma Tanzania
- Motto: Pax, Stabilitas et Prosperitas.
- Employees: Classified
- Annual budget: Classified
- Agency executive: Suleiman Abubakar Mombo, Director General; Deputy Director General (Mainland Tanzania); Deputy Director General (Tanzania Zanzibar)
- Child Agency: Prevention and Combating of Corruption Bureau
- Key document: The Tanzania Intelligence and Security Service Act, 1996

The Tanzania Intelligence and Security Service (TISS; Swahili: Idara ya Usalama wa Taifa) is the civilian intelligence agency of Tanzania. It is responsible for intelligence gathering and national security matters within the country. The agency traces its origins to the Special Branch (SB), a unit established under the British colonial administration in 1952.

TISS was formally established under the Tanzania Intelligence and Security Service Act, 1996, which came into force in 1998. The agency is headquartered in Dodoma and is headed by a Director General. The agency cooperates with domestic and foreign security and intelligence organizations on matters related to national security, counterterrorism, and regional stability.

== Former Director Generals ==
N/A	Name	Time of service	Details
1	Emilio Charles Mzena	1961–1975	The first Director General after independence, he was appointed by the presidentJulius Nyerere.
2	Dr. Lawrence Gama (PhD)	1975–1978	He was later appointed as Dodoma's Regional Commissioner.
3	Dr. Hassy Kitine (PhD)	1978–1980	The youngest Director General ever since its formation. He mainly operated during Kagera war.Vita vya Kagera.
4	Dr. Augustine Mahiga (PhD) (Deputy)	1980–1983	He later served as an ambassador and a Diplomat of the United Nations
5	Lt. Gen. Imrani Kombe	1983–1995	Died in the year 1996.
6	Col. Apson Mwang’onda	1995–2005	Modernized TISS.
7	Othman Rashid	2005–2016	Served as during Jakaya Kikwete time as president.
8	Dr. Modestus Kipilimba (PhD)	2016 – 12 Sept 2019	Appointed by the Late President John Pombe Magufuli.
9	CP Diwani Athumani Msuya	12 Sept 2019 – 3 Jan 2023	He was a Police Commissioner.
10	Said Hussein Massoro	3 Jan 2023 – ~Aug 2023	Served for 8 months, the shortest time ever in TISS history
11	Balozi Ali Idi Siwa	Aug 2023 – 11 July 2024	Also served a short time of 11 months.
12	Suleiman Abubakar Mombo	11 July 2024 – Present	was appointed by the president Samia Suluhu Hassan.

== History ==
Tanzania Intelligence and Security Service (TISS) traces its originstom the British Colonial Period, where Special Branch (SB) was created as a department of the Tanganyika Police Force. The department worked operated independently from the then Criminal Investigation Department (CID).

=== Special Branch (SB) ===
The idea of its formation took root in the year 1947 as advised by the British Intelligence MI6 which was responsible for espionage activities in the UK and its colonies. MI6 wanted its establishment of the department in Tanganyika just like Britain's other colonies like Kenya, Uganda, Rhodesia etc., and while as freedom movement In Tanganyika intensified under Tanganyika African National Union (TANU) now Chama Cha Mapinduzi (CCM) led to a fast development of Special Branch that by the year 1958 it had 4 Zonal Offices in 4 Provinces out of the total 8 Provinces.

=== 1958 ===
It is from the year 1958 even more Police Officers were enrolled in the department and received special training to sharpen their skills related to espionage. The first security guard of the Late President Julius Kambarage Nyerere, Peter Bwimbo, served in as a Special Branch Officer in the Lake Victoria Zone from 1953 to 1958. At the time, the main role of Special Branch was to spy on the activities of Tanganyika African National Union (TANU) leaders including Mwl. Julius Kambarage Nyerere, Oscar Kambona, Rashid Kawawa, Asanterabi Zephaniah Nsilo Swai and many more to Freedom Movement leaders to determine their political direction.

=== 1961 ===
In August 1961 was created a special force for the protection of leaders including the then Prime Ministers Julius Kambarage Nyerere. After Tanganyika Independence on December the same year, just like other sensitive departments, Special Branch (SB) was still under the British Colonial Control and most of its leaders we still British. The only Tanganyikan with a relatively high position was Emilio Charles Mzena who by then was the Assistant Superintendent of Police (ASP). The then Africanization Movement that was led by TANU that wanted Africana to be given Power in leadership led to Emilio Charles Mzena being appointed as the first Director General of Special Branch (SB) in June 1962. Emilio Charles Mzena, Peter Bwimbo and Lawrence Gama were among African-origin Special Branch Members that got their training in Several British institutions in the 1950s.

=== Idara ya Usalama wa Taifa (Tanzania) ===
Was officially established on 9 September 1963 by the Minister of Defense and foreign affairs Oscar Kambona and the Minister of Internal affairs Job Marecela Lusinde. It was therefore removed under the Police forces and Ministry of internal affairs to a fully fledged department under the Ministry of Defense and later under President's office. A new Intelligence Unit was formed under the leadership of Wynn Jones Mbwambo, Director of Security and Protocol of the Ministry of Foreign Affairs, he was later detained in the year 1967 for conspiracy on inspiring defense forces to take over the country few months after Oscar Kambona fled the country. Some other major changes after Idara ya Usalama wa Taifa (Tanzania) was the removal of 133 officers that served in Special Branch (SB) back to the police department only few (28) high-ranking officials remained. The 28 were joined by TANU youths who were trained in public service and who before that were in a TANU department responsible for Intelligence.

=== Tanzania Intelligence and Security Service Act ===
On March 10, 1998, the Tanzania Intelligence and Security Service Act was commenced and became law.
