= Lawrence Gama =

Tanzanian politician (1935–2009)

Honourable Lawrence Gama MP

Member of Parliament for Songea Town
- In office October 1995 – 2005
- Succeeded by: Emmanuel Nchimbi

Secretary General Chama Cha Mapinduzi
- In office 1995–1997
- Chairman: Benjamin Mkapa
- Preceded by: Horace Kolimba
- Succeeded by: Philip Mangula

Personal details
- Born: 19 January 1935 Tanganyika Territory
- Died: 16 December 2009 (aged 74)
- Resting place: Songea
- Party: Chama Cha Mapinduzi
- Spouse(s): Siwajibu Salum Abdallah; Terezya Huvisa
- Relations: Zainab Amir Gama
- Children: 5
- Education: University of Berlin (MSc), PhD)

Lawrence M. Gama (19 January 1935 – 16 December 2009) was a Tanzanian politician and statesman. He served as Member of Parliament for the Songea constituency from 1995 to 2005 and was the Head of the National Service from May 1970 to January 1973, prior to that position. Gama also served as Regional Commissioner for the Dodoma, Ruvuma, Tabora, and Morogoro Regions of Tanzania, and Head of the Special Branch (precursor to the present day Tanzania Intelligence and Security Services - TISS).
