= Bashiru Ally =

Tanzanian academic and politician

Honorable Bashiru Ally MP

Chama Cha Mapinduzi Secretary General
- In office 31 May 2018 – 30 April 2021
- Chairman: John Magufuli
- Preceded by: Abdulrahman Kinana
- Succeeded by: Daniel Chongolo

Chief Secretary to the President
- In office February 2020 – March 2020
- President: John Magufuli
- Preceded by: John William Kijazi
- Succeeded by: Hussein Kattanga

Member of Parliament
- Incumbent
- Assumed office March 2021
- President: Samia Suluhu
- Constituency: None (Nominated MP)

Personal details
- Party: Chama Cha Mapinduzi
- Education: University of Dar es Salaam
- Profession: Lecturer • Researcher • Diplomat • Academic • Social Activist
- Known for: Political Science

Bashiru Ally Kakurwa is a Tanzanian academic, diplomat and politician.

He was the Chief Secretary of the President of Tanzania in the 5th Cabinet, appointed by President Magufuli into office February 26, 2021. Before he was a Secretary General of Chama Cha Mapinduzi political party in Tanzania, appointed into office on May 31, 2018. Prior to his appointment as party Secretary General, he was a lecturer at the University of Dar es Salaam.

Under President Samia Suluhu Hassan she reshuffled her cabinet and appointed Bashiru as a member of parliament on March 31, 2021.

Party political offices
Preceded by Abdulrahman Kinana	Chama Cha Mapinduzi Secretary General; 2018–2021	Succeeded by Daniel Chongolo
Political offices
Preceded by Ombeni Sefue	Chief Secretary President office 2020–2020	Succeeded by Hassan Kattanga
