= January Makamba =

Tanzanian politician (born 1974)

Honourable January Makamba MP
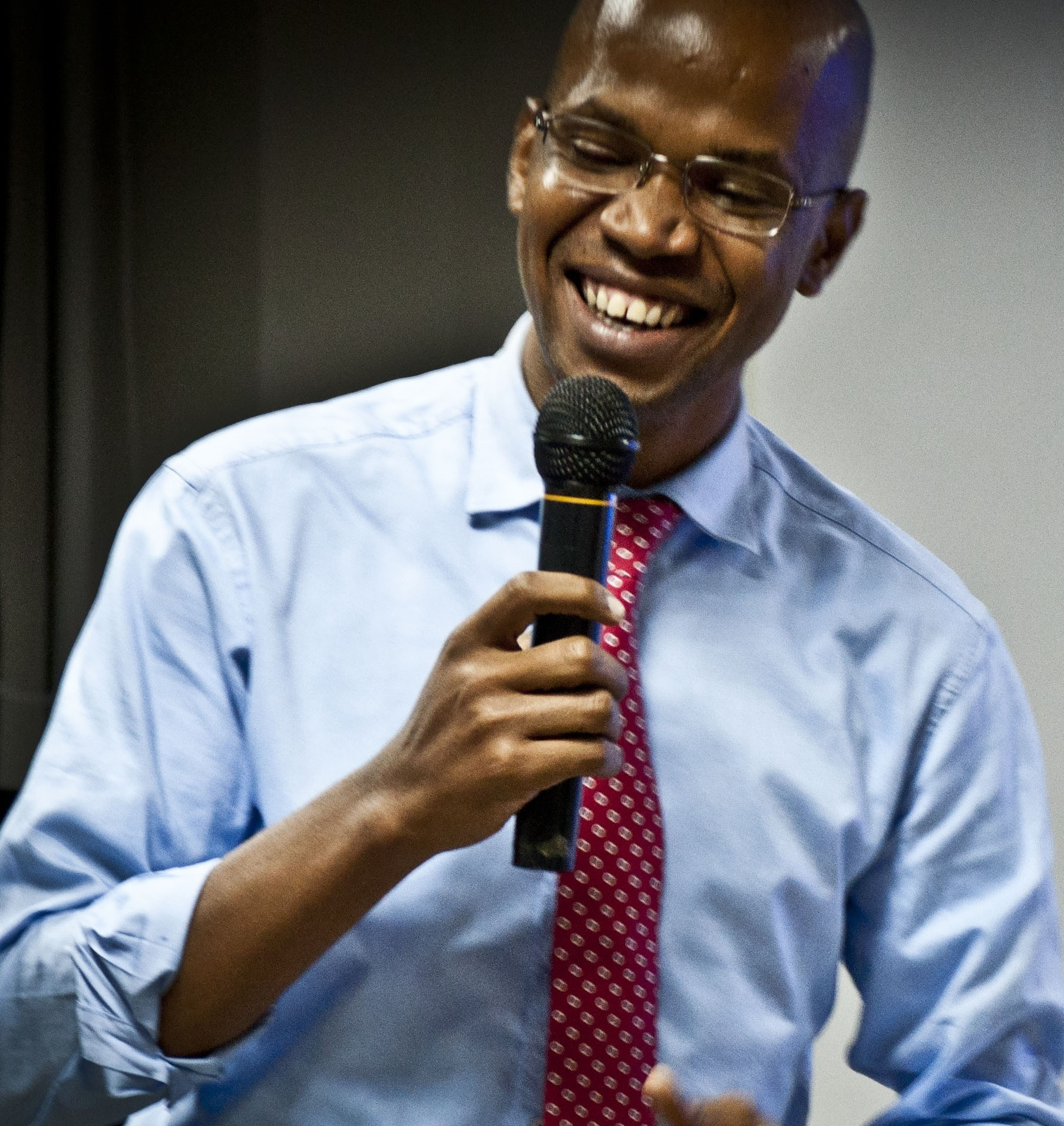

Minister of Foreign Affairs and East African Cooperation
- In office 1 September 2023 – 21 July 2024
- President: Samia Suluhu
- Preceded by: Stergomena Tax
- Succeeded by: Mahmoud Thabit Kombo

2nd Minister of Energy
- In office 12 September 2021 – 31 August 2023
- President: Samia Suluhu
- Preceded by: Medard Kalemani
- Succeeded by: Doto Biteko

Minister of State in the Vice President's Office
- In office 12 December 2015 – 21 July 2019
- President: John Magufuli
- Succeeded by: George Simbachawene

Deputy Minister of Communication, Science and Technology
- In office 7 May 2012 – 5 November 2015
- Minister: Makame Mbarawa
- Preceded by: Charles Kitwanga

Member of Parliament for Bumbuli
- Incumbent
- Assumed office November 2010
- Preceded by: William Shellukindo

Personal details
- Born: 28 January 1974 (age 52) Singida, Tanzania
- Party: CCM
- Spouse: Ramona Urassa
- Relations: Yusuf Makamba (father)
- Children: 2
- Education: St. John’s University; George Mason University
- Website: www.januarymakamba.com

January Yusuf Makamba (born 28 January 1974) is a Tanzanian CCM politician and Member of Parliament for Bumbuli constituency since 2010.

== Early life and career ==
Makamba was born in Singida Region and is the eldest of four children. His father, Yusuf Makamba, a stalwart of the country's dominant ruling party, the Chama Cha Mapinduzi (CCM) and had served as its Secretary General. His mother, Josephine, is from Missenyi District in Kagera Region. He spent his early childhood in his ancestral home of Mahezangulu village in Lushoto District and at his maternal grandmother's village in Kagera Region, which was at the time invaded by Ugandan troops during the Uganda–Tanzania War.

He was educated at Handeni and Galanos secondary schools in Secondary School; and at Forest Hill High School. He attended Quincy College in Massachusetts, United States for a preliminary course before transferring to Saint John's University in Minnesota, where he majored in Peace Studies. He then undertook an internship at the Carter Center, before obtaining his MSc in Conflict Analysis and Resolution from the School for Conflict Analysis and Resolution at George Mason University in 2004.

Upon his return to Tanzania, he joined the Foreign Ministry as a Foreign Service Officer (Grade II). Jakaya Kikwete, the Foreign Minister at the time would later on vie for the presidency in the 2005 election. Makamba joined his campaign team and traversed across the country visiting all the districts. Following Kikwete's landslide victory of over 80 percent, he was appointed as an aide to the President. His formal title was Personal Assistant to the President – Special Duties (PAP-SD); a position that he would serve for five years until 2010.

== Political career ==
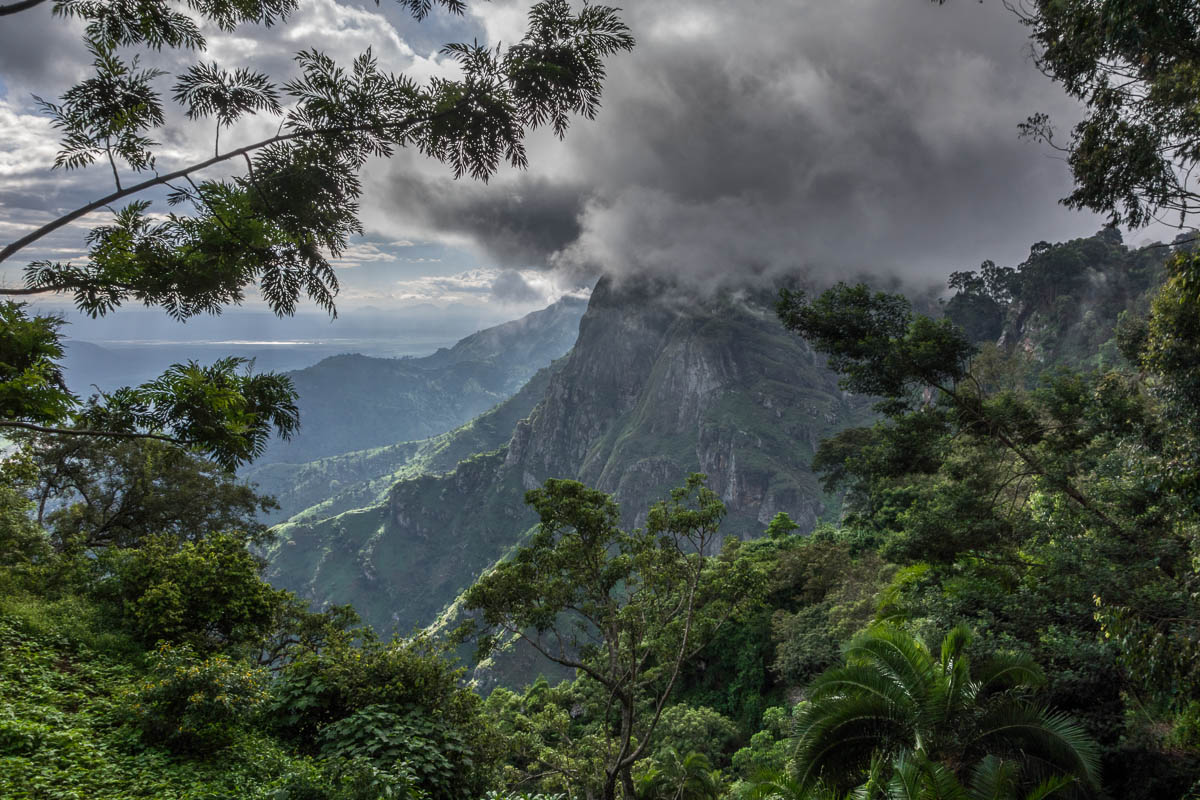
Western Usambara in Lushoto district is Makamba's ancestral home

In 2010, he contested in the election as a Member of Parliament for his home constituency of Bumbuli and was elected unopposed. In the 10th Parliament, he served as the Chairman of the Parliamentary Committee for Energy and Minerals.

In April 2011, he replaced Bernard Membe as CCM's Political Affairs and International Relations Secretary and served in this post until November 2012 when he was succeeded by Asha-Rose Migiro at the 8th National Congress of the CCM. Makamba was also elected as one of the ten members of the National Executive Committee (NEC) from the mainland part of the country. He received the second highest number of votes (2,093).

In May 2012, President Kikwete appointed him as the Deputy Minister of Communication, Science and Technology following a cabinet reshuffle. In July, he launched the Bumbuli Development Corporation, a personal initiative that would seek to supplement the government's effort in bringing development to his constituency. In August 2014, he was nominated by the Vodacom Tanzania CEO to participate in the Ice Bucket Challenge in order to raise awareness for obstetric fistula patients in Tanzania; or donate US$100. Makamba decided to donate TSh 1,000,000/= (US$600) instead.

In October 2014, Makamba was quoted advocating dictatorship as a means to end graft in politics.

=== 2015 presidential campaign ===
On 2 July 2014, he announced on BBC Television in London that he was 90% certain that he would contest in his party's primaries for the presidency, he was the first candidate to declare IKULU position for the 2015 election, and after that a slew of candidates announced.

On 9 July 2014, President Kikwete whilst on a four-day official tour of Tanga Region, addressed Makamba's constituents and praised their MP for his work. On his presidential ambition, Kikwete advised him to look at him as an example. President Kikwete ran first time for the presidency in 1995, he did not succeed but second time in 2005 he was elected. President Kikwete told Makamba that when the time comes, he would get the presidency. ^{5]}.

During his 2015 presidential campaign, Makamba launched a book authored by Fr. Karugendo titled 40 Questions 40 Answers: A Conversation with January Makamba. The book was prefaced by retired President Ali Hassan Mwinyi, was detailed with his vision for #TanzaniaMpya meaning The New Tanzania with top priority on job creation and if elected, he will introduce a jobs bill that will need about $2 billion. Other priorities were social services, and good governance.

During the CCM presidential primaries, January Makamba was the youngest of the five politicians that made it to CCM’s top 5 presidential candidates, beating CCM veterans including former Prime Ministers, Vice President, and party veterans. After Dr. John Magufuli secured CCM nomination, Makamba returned to Bumbuli constituency where he was re-elected into second term by 84% of the total votes. Also, during 2015 Presidential elections, he was part of 32 cadres that made up CCM Campaign Committee, doubling as spokesperson of the campaign and in-charge of CCM communications during the entire campaign. Makamba also was a member of small team selected by CCM Chairman to prepare party’s manifesto (Ilani ya uchaguzi) for five years period 2015-2020.

=== Cabinet Positions ===
In December 2015, he was appointed as a Minister of State in the Vice President’s Office for Union Affairs and Environment. On 12 September 2021 he was appointed as Minister of Energy by the President Samia Suluhu Hassan. Following the third cabinet reshuffle by Samia Suluhu on 1 September 2023, January assumed the position as the Ministry of Foreign Affairs and East African Cooperation. He was replaced in this position by Mahmoud Thabit Kombo in July 2024.

== Personal life ==
Makamba is a Muslim. He is married to Ramona and is the father of two children. He is an avid football fan and supports Simba S.C., Coastal Union, Chelsea and Real Madrid.

== Honours and awards ==
- 2013: Young Global Leader by the World Economic Forum
- 2013: National Democratic Institute’s Democracy Award
- 2014: 10 Most Powerful Men In Africa, Forbes Magazine
