= Philip Mangula =

Tanzanian politician and civil servant

Vice Chairman Chama Cha Mapinduzi
- In office 13 November 2012 – 1 April 2022
- Succeeded by: Abdulrahman Kinana

Kagera Regional Commissioner
- In office 1996–2002
- Preceded by: Lawrence Gama
- Succeeded by: Yusuf Makamba

Personal details
- Born: 31 March 1941 (age 85) Imalimnyi, Wanging'ombe, Njombe.
- Party: CCM
- Spouse: Yolanda Mangula
- Children: Twide, Lukelo, Malumbo

Philip Mangula is a Tanzanian politician and civil servant who was Vice Chairman of the Chama Cha Mapinduzi party from 2012 to 2022.
