= Minister of Foreign Affairs (Tanzania) =

Political office in Tanzania

- Waziri wa Mambo ya Nje (Swahili)

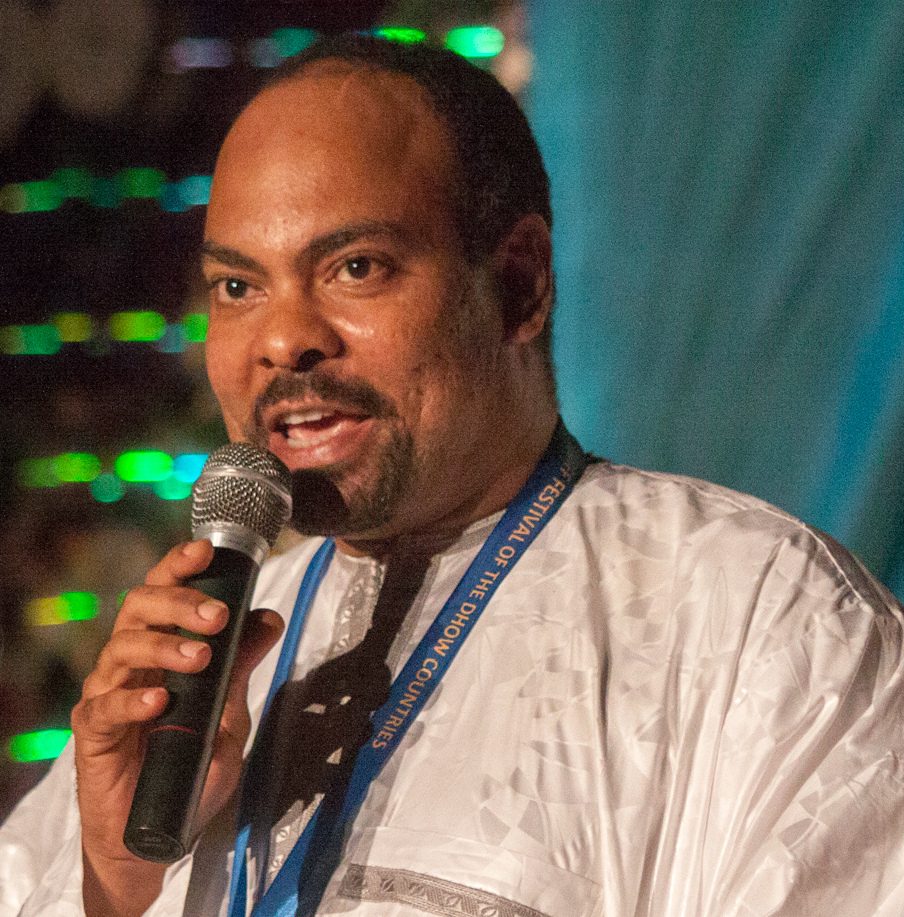
- Incumbent; Mahmoud Thabit Kombo since 26 July 2024
- Ministry of Foreign Affairs and International Co-operation
- Style: Honourable Minister
- Member of: Cabinet
- Seat: Dar es Salaam, Tanzania
- Appointer: President
- Term length: At the President's discretion
- First holder: Oscar Kambona
- Website: www.foreign.go.tz

The Minister of Foreign Affairs is the head of the Ministry of Foreign Affairs and International Co-operation of the Government of Tanzania.

== List of ministers ==
The following have served the ministry:

Parties

TANU CCM

#	Portrait	Minister	Took office	Left office	President
1		Oscar Kambona	1963	1966	Julius Nyerere
2		Chedial Mgonja	1967	1969	Julius Nyerere
3		Stephen Mhando	1969	1970	Julius Nyerere
4		Israel Elinewinga	1971	1972	Julius Nyerere
5		John Malecela	1972	1974	Julius Nyerere
6		Ibrahim Kaduma	1975	1976	Julius Nyerere
7		Benjamin Mkapa	1977	1980	Julius Nyerere
8		Salim Ahmed Salim	1981	1984	Julius Nyerere
(7)		Benjamin Mkapa	1984	1990	Ali Hassan Mwinyi
9		Ahmed Hassan Diria	1991	1992	Ali Hassan Mwinyi
10		Joseph Rwegasira	1993	1995	Ali Hassan Mwinyi
11		Jakaya Kikwete	November 1995	21 December 2005	Benjamin Mkapa
12		Asha-Rose Migiro	6 January 2006	11 January 2007	Jakaya Kikwete
13		Bernard Membe	12 January 2007	5 November 2015	Jakaya Kikwete
14		Augustine Mahiga	14 December 2015	3 March 2019	John Magufuli
15		Palamagamba John Aidan Mwaluko Kabudi	3 March 2019	31 March 2021	John Magufuli
16		Liberata Mulamula	31 March 2021	3 October 2022	Samia Suluhu
17		Stergomena Tax	3 October 2022	1 September 2023	Samia Suluhu
18		January Makamba	1 September 2023	26 July 2024	Samia Suluhu
19		Mahmoud Thabit Kombo	26 July 2024	Incumbent	Samia Suluhu
