= Oscar Kambona =

Former foreign affairs minister

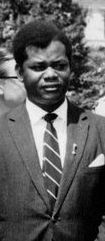

1st Minister of External Affairs
- In office 1963–1966
- President: Julius Nyerere
- Succeeded by: Chedial Mgonja

Personal details
- Born: 13 August 1928 Mbinga District, Tanganyika
- Died: 3 June 1997 (aged 68) London, United Kingdom
- Resting place: Tanzania
- Party: TADEA
- Other political affiliations: Tanganyika African National Union
- Spouse: Flora Moriyo
- Children: Mosi; Neema; Sekou
- Education: Middle Temple

Oscar Salathiel Kambona (13 August 1928 – 3 June 1997) was the first Minister of Foreign Affairs of Tanganyika from 1963 to 1966.

The son of the Reverend David Kambona and Miriam Kambona, Kambona's father was among the first African priests to be ordained into the Anglican Church of Tanganyika. He received his elementary school education at home taught by his parents and uncle, all of whom were teachers. Kambona was then sent to St. Barnabas Middle School in Liuli, Southern Tanganyika, near his home. He subsequently attended Alliance Secondary School in Dodoma, Central Tanganyika.

== Political career ==
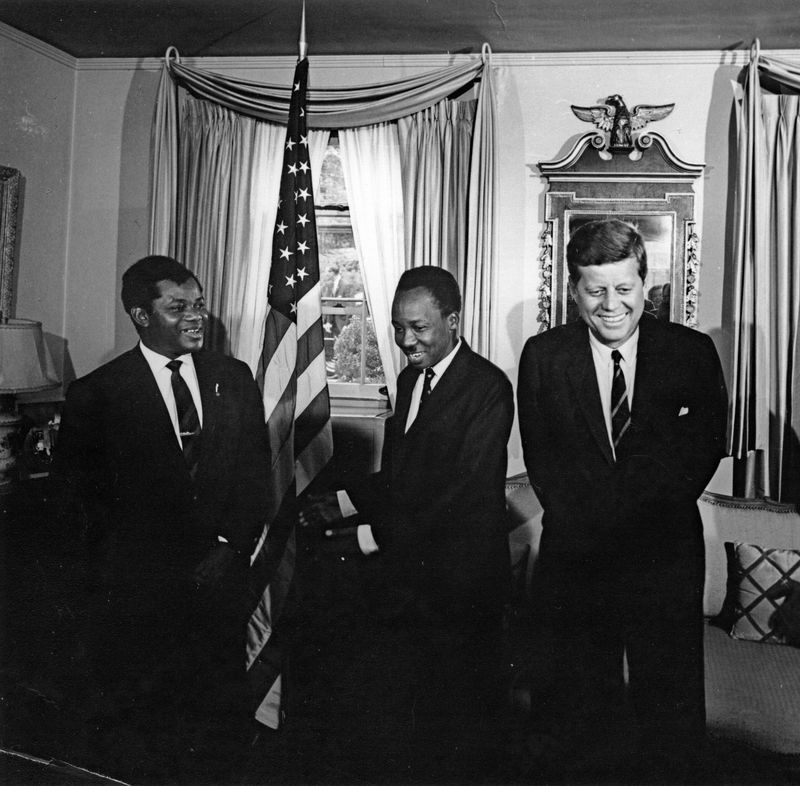
Oscar Kambona with President Nyerere and President Kennedy in 1963

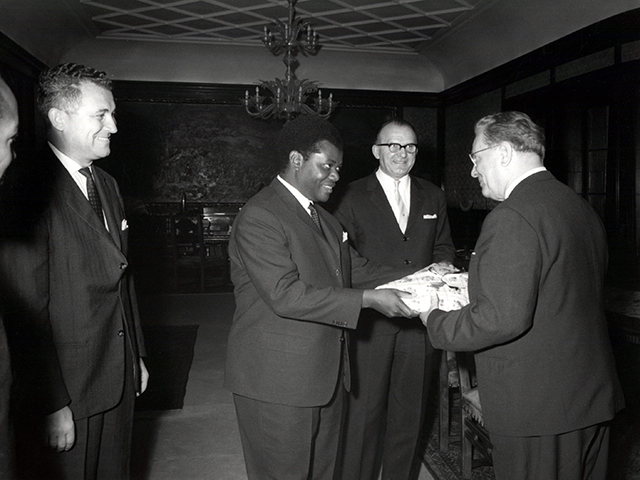
Oscar Kambona with President of Yugoslavia Josip Broz Tito in Belgrade in 1964

Kambona became the secretary-general of the Tanganyika African National Union (TANU) during the struggle for independence and worked closely with Nyerere, who was president of TANU, the party that led Tanganyika to independence. Tanganyika secured independence from Britain on December 9, 1961.

In February 1967, Tanzania adopted the Arusha Declaration, an economic and political blueprint for the transformation of Tanzania into a socialist state. Kambona was opposed to this fundamental change and argued that the government should first launch a pilot scheme to see if the policy was going to work on a national scale.

Tony Laurence states in his book The Dar Mutiny of 1964, published by Book Guild Publishing, that, fearing for his life, Kambona went to live in exile in Great Britain with no financial support and took a number of low-paying jobs to support himself and his family.

== Sources ==
- Godfrey Mwakikagile, chapter 13, "Coup Attempts Against President Julius Nyerere and Reflections on Coup Leader Oscar Kambona by Andrew Nyerere," in his book Nyerere and Africa: End of an Era, 2nd Edition (Las Vegas, Nevada: Protea Publishing Co., 2005), pp. 359 – 377.

The book covers extensively the 1970 treason trial in which Oscar Kambona was implicated as the ring leader. The trial was open to the public.

The author has also addressed the army mutiny of 1964 in Tanganyika among many other subjects.

- Godfrey Mwakikagile: Eurocentric Africanist? https://sites.google.com/site/intercontinentalbookcentre/godfrey-mwakikagile-a-eurocentric-pan-africanist
- Jacqueline Audrey Kalley, Southern African Political History: A Chronology of Key Political Events from Independence to Mid-1997 (Greenwood Press, 1999), p. 594, where she says President Julius Nyerere challenged Oscar Kambona to return to Tanzania and testify before a judicial commission that he had not deposited large sums of money in his account.
- "Bibi Titi and the Treason Trial of 1970," in The East African, Nairobi, Kenya, 10–16 November 1999.
- Adam Seftel and Annie Smyth, editors, Tanzania: The Story of Julius Nyerere, Mkuki na Nyota Publishers, Dar es Salaam, Tanzania, and Fountain Publishers, Kampala, Uganda.
- Kambona Foundation, Dar es Salaam, Tanzania.
