= Elias Magosi =

African public official from Botswana

Elias Mpedi Magosi
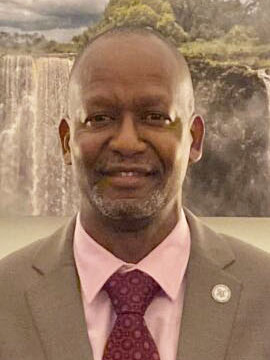
- SADC Executive Secretary Elias Magosi

7th Executive Secretary of the Southern African Development Community (SADC)
- Incumbent
- Assumed office 1 September 2021
- Preceded by: Stergomena Tax

Personal details
- Born: Elias Mpedi Magosi Botswana
- Education: University of Botswana (BA) University of Bolton (Graduate Diploma) Bowling Green State University (MA)
- Profession: Public Servant, Human Resources Expert

Elias Mpedi Magosi is a Botswana national and public servant who currently serves as the executive secretary of the Southern African Development Community (SADC), a position he assumed on 1 September 2021. He was sworn in during the 41st SADC Summit of Heads of State and Government held in Lilongwe, Malawi, on 18 August 2021. Magosi is the seventh individual to hold this position, which oversees the implementation of SADC's regional integration and development agenda.

== Early life and education ==
Elias Mpedi Magosi holds a master's degree in organisation development from Bowling Green State University, United States, a graduate diploma in management services from the University of Bolton, United Kingdom, and a Bachelor of Arts in economics and statistics from the University of Botswana.

== Career ==
=== Public service ===
Magosi began his career in 1989 as a management analyst in the Directorate of Public Service Management of Botswana. Over the years, he rose through the ranks, serving as permanent secretary in various ministries. In February 2020, he was appointed as the principal secretary to the president, effectively becoming the head of the public service in Botswana. In this role, he coordinated and facilitated linkages between ministries and parastatals to achieve national and international obligations. He also provided advisory support to the president, vice president, cabinet, permanent secretaries, the private sector, and regional bodies.

=== Private Sector ===
Magosi has extensive experience in the private sector, particularly in human resources. From 2013 to 2014, he served as the cluster head of human resources for consumer banking, Southern Africa, at Standard Chartered Bank, where he managed human resource strategies for the consumer banking businesses in Botswana, Zambia, and Zimbabwe.

Prior to this, he was the head of human resources at Botswana Life Insurance Limited from 2007 to 2010. He later assumed the role of group head of human resources at Botswana Insurance Holdings Limited, the parent company of Botswana Life Insurance, from 2010 to 2012.

=== SADC Secretariat ===
Magosi has a deep understanding of SADC's role in regional integration, having previously served as director of human resources and administration at the SADC Secretariat. In this capacity, he was instrumental in developing and executing the secretariat's human resource strategy while engaging with SADC member states and other stakeholders as part of the secretariat management.

=== Executive Secretary of SADC ===
As the executive secretary of SADC, Magosi heads the principal executive institution of the organization. His responsibilities include overseeing the implementation of the Regional Indicative Strategic Development Plan (RISDP) 2020-2030 and SADC Vision 2050, which aim to transform the region into a peaceful, inclusive, competitive, and industrialized middle-to-high-income area where all citizens enjoy sustainable economic well-being, justice, and freedom.

Magosi emphasizes the importance of collective and collaborative efforts among SADC member states, the private sector, international cooperating partners, and regional and international bodies to achieve SADC's goals.
