= Wilson Mukama =

Tanzanian CCM politician

Secretary General Chama Cha Mapinduzi
- In office 2011–2012
- Chairman: Jakaya Kikwete
- Preceded by: Yusuf Makamba
- Succeeded by: Abdulrahman Kinana

Personal details
- Born: 1949 (age 76–77)
- Party: Chama Cha Mapinduzi

Wilson Mukama is a Tanzanian CCM politician and former Secretary General of Chama Cha Mapinduzi.
