= Yusuf Makamba =

Tanzanian CCM politician and military officer

Honourable Lt. Col. Yusuf Makamba MP

Secretary General Chama Cha Mapinduzi
- In office 2007–2011
- Chairman: Benjamin Mkapa
- Preceded by: Philip Mangula
- Succeeded by: Wilson Mukama

Member of Parliament
- In office 2005–2010
- Appointed by: Jakaya Kikwete
- Constituency: None (Nominated MP)

Personal details
- Born: Bumbuli, Tanga Region
- Party: CCM
- Spouse: Josephine Makamba
- Children: 4 including January
- Education: Tanzania Military Academy

Yusuf Makamba is a Tanzanian CCM politician and former military officer.

== Personal life ==
He is married to Josephine and they have four children: January, Ali, Thuwein and Mwamvita. He supports the Tanzanian Premier League club Simba S.C. countrywide and his hometown Coastal Union.
