= Abdulrahman Kinana =

Tanzanian politician

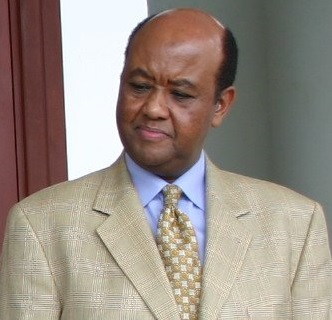

Chama Cha Mapinduzi Vice chairman
- Incumbent
- Assumed office April 2022
- Chairman: Samia Suluhu
- Preceded by: Philip Mangula

1st Speaker of the EALA
- In office November 2001 – 2006

Secretary General Chama Cha Mapinduzi
- In office 2012–2018
- Chairman: John Magufuli
- Preceded by: Wilson Mukama
- Succeeded by: Bashiru Ally

Personal details
- Born: October 1951 (age 75) Arusha
- Party: CCM
- Spouse: Rahma Hussein

Abdulrahman Omari Kinana is a Tanzanian politician who served as the first Speaker of the East African Legislative Assembly from 2001 to 2006. He has been secretary-general of Chama Cha Mapinduzi, the ruling party, from 2012 to 2018.

== Biography ==
Kinana served in the Tanzanian Armed Forces for 20 years before retiring as a colonel in 1992. He has also served as the Deputy Minister of Foreign Affairs, and Minister of State for Defence. He was a member of the Tanzanian Parliament for Arusha constituency for 10 years. Kinana's father moved to Tanzania when he was a child and hails from Somali Sheekhaal clan.
