= Southern African Development Community =

Inter-governmental organization

(in other official languages)
Afrikaans	Suider-Afrikaanse Ontwikkelingsgemeenskap
French	Communauté de développement d'Afrique australe
Portuguese	Comunidade para o Desenvolvimento da África Austral
Swahili	Jumuiya ya Maendeleo ya Nchi za Kusini mwa Afrika
- Flag Logo
- Motto: "Towards a Common Future"
- Anthem: SADC Anthem
- Map of Africa indicating SADC (light green) and SADC+SACU (dark green) members
- Headquarters: Gaborone
- Largest city: Kinshasa
- Working languages: English; French; Portuguese; Swahili
- Demonym: Southern African
- Type: Intergovernmental
- Membership: 16 states: Angola; Botswana; Comoros; DR Congo; Eswatini; Lesotho; Madagascar; Malawi; Mauritius; Mozambique; Namibia; Seychelles; South Africa; Tanzania; Zambia; Zimbabwe

Leaders
  - Summit Chairperson: (South Africa) Cyril Ramaphosa
  - Council Chairperson: (South Africa) Ronald Lamola
  - SADC PF Chairperson: (Madagascar) Siteny Randrianasoloniaiko
  - Executive Secretary: (Botswana) Elias Mpedi Magosi
- Legislature: SADC Parliamentary Forum

Establishment
  - as SADCC: 1 April 1980
  - as SADC: 17 August 1992

Area
  - Total: 9,672,702 km^{2} (3,734,651 sq mi)

Population
  - 2026 estimate: ▲430.51 million
- GDP (PPP): 2026 estimate
  - Total: $2.62 trillion
  - Per capita: $6,086
- GDP (nominal): 2026 estimate
  - Total: $957.38 billion
  - Per capita: $2,224
- Time zone: UTC+1 to +4
- Website www.sadc.int

The Southern African Development Community (SADC) is an inter-governmental organization headquartered in Gaborone, Botswana.

== Goals ==
The SADC's goal is to further regional socio-economic cooperation and integration as well as political and security cooperation among 16 countries in southern Africa. Although its primary objectives are development, economic growth, and poverty alleviation, peacekeeping has become increasingly important to the SADC.

== History ==
The origins of SADC are in the 1960s and 1970s, when the leaders of majority-ruled countries and national liberation movements coordinated their political, diplomatic and military struggles to bring an end to colonial and white-minority rule in southern Africa. The immediate forerunner of the political and security cooperation leg of today's SADC was the informal Frontline States (FLS) grouping. It was formed in 1980.

Flag of the SADCC (1980–1992)

The Southern African Development Coordination Conference (SADCC) was the forerunner of the socio-economic cooperation leg of today's SADC. The adoption by nine majority-ruled southern African countries of the Lusaka declaration on 1 April 1980 paved the way for the formal establishment of SADCC in April 1980.

Membership of the FLS and SADCC sometimes differed.

SADCC was transformed into SADC on 17 August 1992, with the adoption by the founding members of SADCC and newly independent Namibia of the Windhoek declaration and treaty establishing SADC. The 1992 SADC provided for both socio-economic cooperation and political and security cooperation. In reality, the FLS was dissolved only in 1994, after South Africa's first democratic elections. Subsequent efforts to place political and security cooperation on a firm institutional footing under SADC's umbrella failed.

On 14 August 2001, the 1992 SADC treaty was amended. The amendment heralded the overhaul of the structures, policies and procedures of SADC, a process which is ongoing. One of the changes is that political and security cooperation is institutionalised in the Organ on Politics, Defence and Security (OPDS); one of the principal SADC bodies. It is subject to the oversight of the organisation's supreme body, the Summit, which comprises the heads of state or government.

The organisation holds its own multi-sport event in the form of the SADC Games, which was first held in 2004 in Maputo. Originally planned for an earlier date in Malawi and Lesotho, organisational issues led to abandonment of the plan and the SADC issuing a fine of $100,000 against Malawi. The first event in 2004 in Maputo resulted in over 1000 youths under-20 from 10 countries taking part in a sports programme including athletics, football, netball, boxing and basketball.

In 2012, the SADC deployed peacekeepers to the Democratic Republic of Congo in order to counter a rebel threat. The deployed troops were supplied by Tanzania, Malawi, and South Africa.

In August 2019 SADC adopted Swahili as its fourth working language, alongside English, French and Portuguese. Kiswahili – a lingua franca in the African Great Lakes region, other parts of East Africa, and to a lesser degree, parts of Southern Africa – is an official language of Tanzania, Kenya and Uganda and of the African Union.

== Member states ==
As of 2022, the SADC has a total of 16 member states:

Member states surface area and populations
Country	Area (km^{2})	Population (2026) (millions)	GDP (USD) (2026)		Notes on Membership
Country	Area (km^{2})	Population (2026) (millions)	Total (billions)	Per Capita (thousands)	Notes on Membership
Angola	1,246,700	40.67	109.86	2.7	
Botswana	582,000	2.81	20.71	7.38	
Comoros	2,235	0.93	1.77	1.9	The Union of Comoros was admitted into SADC at the 37th SADC Summit of Heads of State and Government held in Pretoria, South Africa in 2017, bringing the total number of Member States to 16.
DR Congo	2,344,858	110.02	88.13	0.801	Since 8 September 1997
Eswatini	17,363	1.19	5.5	4.61	
Lesotho	30,355	2.42	2.47	1.02	
Madagascar	587,295	32.32	21.09	0.653	Admitted on 18 August 2005. Membership reinstated on 30 January 2014 after an imposed suspension in 2009
Malawi	118,484	24.75	17.86	0.721	
Mauritius	1,969	1.25	16.76	13.36	Since 28 August 1995
Mozambique	801,590	36.83	26.51	0.720	
Namibia	824,268	3.11	16.1	5.18	Since 21 March 1990 (since independence)
Seychelles	456	0.1	2.25	21.94	Also previously a member of SADC from 8 September 1997 until 1 July 2004 then joined again in 2008.
South Africa	1,221,037	64.91	443.64	6.83	Since 30 August 1994
Tanzania	947,303	69.18	95.35	1.38	
Zambia	752,612	22.29	35.95	1.52	
Zimbabwe	390,757	17.73	55.43	3.13	

=== Future member states ===
Burundi has requested to join.

== Protocols ==
SADC has 27 legally binding protocols dealing with issues such as Defence, Development, Illicit Drug Trade, Free Trade and Movement of People.

- Protocol on Energy (1996) – Intended to promote harmonious development of national energy policies. These development strategies set out tangible objectives for SADC and its Member States for infrastructure development in energy and its subsectors of woodfuel, petroleum and natural gas, electricity, coal, renewable energy, and energy efficiency and conservation.
- Protocol on Gender and Development – Member states are urged to accelerate implementation efforts towards the achievements of concrete and transformative changes in the lives of women and girls in the region. H.E. President Mutharika also expressed concern on the escalating incidents of gender based violence in the region, especially those perpetrated against women and girls, and used this occasion to sign a commitment to end child marriages, as part of the AU campaign to end Child Marriages in Africa.
- Protocol on Politics, Defence and Security Co-operation (2001) – Intended to foster regional security and defence cooperation, promote peace, political stability and conflict-management. The protocol initiated also an institutional reform of the SADC's Organ for Politics, Defence and Security (OPDS).

== SADC FTA ==
The SADC Free Trade Area was established in August 2008, after the implementation of the SADC Protocol on Trade in 2000 laid the foundation for its formation. Its original members were Botswana, Lesotho, Madagascar, Mauritius, Mozambique, Namibia, South Africa, Eswatini, Tanzania, Zambia and Zimbabwe, with Malawi and Seychelles joining later. Of the 15 SADC member states, only Angola and the Democratic Republic of Congo are not yet participating, however Angolan trade minister Joffre Van-Dúnen Júnior said in Luanda that his ministry is working to create conditions for Angola's accession to the SADC Free Trade Area in 2019. The SADC-Customs Union, scheduled to be established by 2010 according to SADC's Regional Indicative Strategic Development Plan (RISDP), is unlikely to become reality in the near future. This is because the European Union's Economic Partnership Agreements (EPA) with their inherent extra-regional freetrade regimes provided for several SADC members more benefits than deeper regional market integration within the framework of a SADC-Customs Union. Since these SADC countries formed four different groupings to negotiate and implement different Economic Partnership Agreements with the European Union, the chance to establish a SADC-wide common external tariff as prerequisite for a regional customs union is missed.

On Wednesday 22 October 2008, SADC joined with the Common Market for Eastern and Southern Africa and the East African Community to form the African Free Trade Zone, including all members of each of the organizations. The leaders of the three trading blocs agreed to create a single free trade zone, the African Free Trade Zone, consisting of 26 countries with a GDP of an estimated $624bn (£382.9bn). It is hoped the African Free Trade Zone agreement would ease access to markets within the zone and end problems arising from the fact that several of the member countries belong to multiple groups.

The African Free Trade Zone effective has been more than a hundred years in the making—a trade zone spanning the whole African continent from Cape to Cairo and envisioned by Cecil Rhodes and other British imperialists in the 1890s. The only difference is that the African Free Trade Zone is the creation of independent African Countries. The idea is a free trade zone spanning the whole continent from the Cape to Cairo (Cape Town in the Republic of South Africa to Cairo in Egypt).

In addition to eliminating duplicative membership and the problem member states also participating in other regional economic cooperation schemes and regional political and security cooperation schemes that may compete with or undermine each other, the African Free Trade Zone further aims to strengthen the bloc's bargaining power when negotiating international deals.

Pursuant to the SADC goal of more integration, Botswana and Namibia signed an agreement in February 2023 allowing citizens to travel between the two countries using only identity cards, with passports no longer being needed. Botswana has held talks with Zimbabwe to achieve a similar deal, and expects to open talks with Zambia.

== Challenges facing member countries ==
SADC countries face many social, development, economic, trade, education, health, diplomatic, defence, security and political challenges. Some of these challenges cannot be tackled effectively by individual members. Cattle diseases and organised-crime gangs know no boundaries. War in one country can suck in its neighbours and damage their economies. The sustainable development that trade could bring is threatened by the existence of different product standards and tariff regimes, weak customs infrastructure and bad roads. The socio-economic and political and security cooperation aims of SADC are equally wide-ranging, and intended to address the various common challenges.

One significant challenge is that member states also participate in other regional economic cooperation schemes and regional political and security cooperation schemes that may compete with or undermine SADC's aims. For example, South Africa and Botswana both belong to the Southern Africa Customs Union, Zambia is a part of the Common Market for Eastern and Southern Africa, and Tanzania is a member of the East African Community.

According to Human Rights Watch, "SADC has been criticized for its laxity on making human rights compliance within its member states a priority".

== Services and Centres ==
- SADC Humanitarian and Emergency Operations Centre (SHOC)
- SADC Regional Counter-Terrorism Centre
- SADC Panel of Elders
- SADC – Development Finance Resource Centre (SADC DFRC)
- SADC Electoral Advisory Council
- SADC Regional Fisheries Monitoring Control and Surveillance Coordination Centre (MCSCC)
- SADC Plant Genetic Resources Centre (SPGRC)
- SADC Administrative Tribunal (SADCAT)
- Centre for Coordination of Agricultural Research and Development for Southern Africa

== Structure and decision-making procedures ==
The organization has six principal bodies:

- The Summit, comprising heads of state or heads of government
- Organ on Politics, Defense and Security
- Council of Ministers
- SADC Tribunal
- SADC National Committees (SNCs)
- Secretariat

Except for the Tribunal (based in Windhoek, Namibia), SNCs and Secretariat, decision-making is by consensus.

== Leaders ==
SADC headquarters building in Gaborone, Botswana.

=== Chairmen ===
Country	Chairperson	Term
Zambia	Levy Mwanawasa	2007–2008
South Africa	Kgalema Motlanthe	2008–2009
Democratic Republic of the Congo	Joseph Kabila	2009–2010
Namibia	Hifikepunye Pohamba	2010–2011
Angola	José Eduardo dos Santos	2011–2012
Mozambique	Armando Guebuza	2012–2013
Malawi	Joyce Banda; Peter Mutharika	2013–31 May 2014; 31 May–17 August 2014
Zimbabwe	Robert Mugabe	2014–17 August 2015
Botswana	Ian Khama	17 August 2015 – 2016
Eswatini	King Mswati III	2016–2017
South Africa	Jacob Zuma; Cyril Ramaphosa	2017–2018
Namibia	Hage Geingob	17 August 2018 – 17 August 2019
Tanzania	John Magufuli	17 August 2019 – 17 August 2020
Mozambique	Filipe Nyusi	17 August 2020 – 17 August 2021
Malawi	Lazarus Chakwera	17 August 2021 – 17 August 2022
Democratic Republic of the Congo	Félix Tshisekedi	17 August 2022 – 17 August 2023
Angola	João Lourenço	17 August 2023 – 17 August 2024
Zimbabwe	Emmerson Mnangagwa	17 August 2024 – 24 August 2025
Madagascar	Andry Rajoelina	24 August 2025 – 17 August 2026
South Africa	Cyril Ramaphosa	17 August 2026 – Present

=== Executive Secretaries ===
Country	Image	Name	Term
Namibia		Kaire Mbuende	1994–2000
Mauritius		Prega Ramsamy	2000–2001 (Acting); 2001–2005
Mozambique		Tomaz Salomão	2005–2013
Tanzania		Stergomena Tax	2013–2021
Botswana		Elias Magosi	2021–present

== Comparison with other regional blocs ==
African Economic Community
Pillar regional blocs (REC)	Area (km²)	Population	GDP (PPP) ($US)		Member states
Pillar regional blocs (REC)	Area (km²)	Population	(millions)	(per capita)	Member states
EAC	5,449,717	349,966,685	737,420	2,149	8
ECOWAS/CEDEAO	5,112,903	349,154,000	1,322,452	3,788	15
IGAD	5,233,604	294,197,387	225,049	1,197	7
AMU/UMA ^{4}	6,046,441	106,919,526	1,299,173	12,628	5
ECCAS/CEEAC	6,667,421	218,261,591	175,928	1,451	11
SADC	9,882,959	394,845,175	737,392	3,152	15
COMESA	12,873,957	406,102,471	735,599	1,811	20
CEN-SAD ^{4}	14,680,111				29
Total AEC	29,910,442	853,520,010	2,053,706	2,406	54
Other regional blocs	Area (km²)	Population	GDP (PPP) ($US)		Member states
Other regional blocs	Area (km²)	Population	(millions)	(per capita)	Member states
WAMZ ^{1}	1,602,991	264,456,910	1,551,516	5,867	6
SACU ^{1}	2,693,418	51,055,878	541,433	10,605	5
CEMAC ^{2}	3,020,142	34,970,529	85,136	2,435	6
UEMOA ^{1}	3,505,375	80,865,222	101,640	1,257	8
UMA ^{2} ^{4}	5,782,140	84,185,073	491,276	5,836	5
GAFTA ^{3} ^{4}	5,876,960	1,662,596	6,355	3,822	5
AES	2,780,159	71,374,000	179,347		3
During 2004. Sources: The World Factbook 2005, IMF WEO Database. Smallest value among the blocs compared. Largest value among the blocs compared.^{1}: Economic bloc inside a pillar REC.^{2}: Proposed for pillar REC, but objecting participation.^{3}: Non-African members of GAFTA are excluded from figures.^{4}: The area 446,550 km^{2} used for Morocco excludes all disputed territories, while 710,850 km^{2} would include the Moroccan-claimed and partially-controlled parts of Western Sahara (claimed as the Sahrawi Arab Democratic Republic by the Polisario Front). Morocco also claims Ceuta and Melilla, making up about 22.8 km^{2} (8.8 sq mi) more claimed territory.

== See also ==
- African Union Passport
- Southern African Development Community Mission in Mozambique (SAMIM)
- Common Market for Eastern and Southern Africa (COMESA)
- East African Community (EAC)
- Economic Community of Central African States (ECCAS)
- Southern African Customs Union (SACU)
- Economic Community of West African States (ECOWAS)
- List of trade blocs
- Rules of Origin
- Market access
- Free-trade area
- Tariffs
