= Chama Cha Mapinduzi =

Dominant political party in Tanzania

Party of the Revolution Chama Cha Mapinduzi
- Abbreviation: CCM
- Chairperson: Samia Suluhu Hassan
- Secretary-General: Asha-Rose Migiro
- Spokesperson: Kenan Kihongosi
- Vice Chairman for the Mainland: Stephen Masato Wassira
- Vice Chairman for the Islands: Hussein Mwinyi
- Founders: Julius Nyerere; Aboud Jumbe
- Founded: 5 February 1977 (49 years, 263 days)
- Merger of: TANU and ASP
- Headquarters: Dodoma
- Newspaper: Uhuru
- Think tank: UONGOZI Institute
- Student wing: Seneti ya Vyuo na Vyuo Vikuu Tanzania
- Youth wing: Umoja wa Vijana wa CCM
- Women's wing: Umoja wa Wanawake Tanzania
- Parents' wing: Chama Cha Wazazi Tanzania
- Farmer's wing: Wakulima
- Worker's Union wing: Wafanyakazi
- Membership (2022): 12,000,000
- Ideology: Tanzanian nationalism; Left-conservatism Ujamaa (disputed); 1977–1985: African socialism; Pan-Africanism
- Political position: Centre-left; 1977–1985: Left-wing
- International affiliation: Progressive Alliance; Socialist International (formerly)
- African affiliation: Former Liberation Movements of Southern Africa
- Colours: Green; Yellow
- Slogan: Ujamaa na Kujitegemea ("Socialism and Independence"); CCM Oyee! ("CCM Hey!")
- Bunge: 398 / 403
- Zanzibar HoR: 68 / 76
- EALA: 7 / 9
- SADC PF: 4 / 5
- Pan-African Parliament: 4 / 5

Election symbol
- A hoe and a hammer

Party flag

Website
- www.ccm.or.tz

The Chama Cha Mapinduzi (CCM, lit. 'Party of the Revolution') is the dominant ruling party in Tanzania. It was formed in 1977 from a merger between the Tanganyika African National Union (TANU) and the Afro-Shirazi Party (ASP), which were the sole operating parties in mainland Tanzania and the semi-autonomous islands of Zanzibar, respectively. It has formed the majority government in Tanzania ever since, making it the second-longest ruling party in the history of Africa, only after the True Whig Party of Liberia.

TANU and its successor CCM have ruled Tanzania uninterruptedly since independence. The party has been described as authoritarian. Although opposition parties have been legal since 1992, the CCM rules the country as a virtual one-party state. Since the creation of a multi-party system, CCM has won the past seven general elections in 1995, 2000, 2005, 2010, 2015, 2020, and 2025. Jakaya Kikwete, its presidential candidate in 2005, won by a landslide, receiving more than 80% of the popular vote and John Magufuli as a candidate in 2020 garnered over 84% of the vote. In the 2020 election, the CCM won 256 of the 264 constituencies, continuing to hold an outright majority in the National Assembly.

== History ==
The party was created on 5 February 1977, under the leadership of Julius Kambarage Nyerere, the Founding Father of Tanzania (then Tanganyika) through the merger of the Tanganyika African National Union (TANU), the ruling party in Tanganyika, and the Afro-Shirazi Party (ASP), the ruling party in Zanzibar.

TANU/CCM has dominated the politics of Tanzania since the independence of Tanganyika in 1961. Due to the merger with the ASP, from 1977 it has also been the ruling party in Zanzibar, though there its grip on power has been more contested since the mid 1990s by the Civic United Front (CUF) which was later superseded in dominance on the islands by the Alliance for Change and Transparency (ACT).

From its formation in 1977 until 1992, it was the only legally permitted party in the country. Every five years, its national chairman was automatically elected to a five-year term as president; he was confirmed in office via a referendum. At the same time, voters were presented with two CCM candidates for the National Assembly or Bunge. This changed on 1 July 1992, when amendments to the Constitution and a number of laws permitting and regulating the formation and operations of more than one political party were enacted by the National Assembly.

The CCM's Zanzibar branch (the former ASP) has historically been significantly more authoritarian than its mainland counterpart, a situation that has remained the case even after opposition parties were legalized in 1992.

== Ideology ==
Originally a champion of African socialism, upholder of the system of collectivized agriculture known as Ujamaa and firmly oriented to the left, today the CCM espouses a more mixed economic approach. CCM hopes to continue to modernize in order to ensure:

1. Increased productivity which would boost the country's revenue
2. Increased employment and improved management
3. Acquisition of new and modern technology
4. Increased and expanded local and international markets for our products, and;
5. Improved and strengthened private sector serving as the engine of the national economy while the government sharpens its focus on provision of social services, infrastructure, security and governance of the state.

Similarly, the CCM's major foreign policy focus is economic diplomacy within the international system, and peaceful coexistence with neighbors.

Under John Magufuli, who served as President of Tanzania from 2015 to his 2021 death, the party moved in a left-conservative direction, prioritizing conservative values, including prominent anti-LGBTQ rhetoric. His successor, Samia Suluhu Hassan, has maintained some social conservative viewpoints as well.

== Electoral performance and support base ==
The CCM has a leading role in society, and had held power even after opposition parties were legalized. Empirical analysis has shown that a sense of nostalgia for a party which brought independence, and which has maintained relative peace is a major cause of the CCM's support base; age had no significant determinant on loyalty to the CCM. The party has strong support from subsistence farmers.

The party has won all presidential elections at both the national level and in Zanzibar at the autonomous level under the multi-party system: 1995, 2000, 2005, 2010, 2015, 2020, and 2025. Its candidate have only dropped below 60 percent once, in 2015. It also dominates the legislature, maintaining a supermajority even in the multiparty era.

In the elections for Zanzibar's presidency and House of Representatives, held on 30 October 2005, incumbent president and CCM candidate Amani Abeid Karume won with 53% of the vote, while the party won 30 seats out of 50.

In the national elections for Tanzania's presidency and National Assembly, held on 14 December 2005, Foreign Minister and CCM candidate Jakaya Kikwete won with 80.28% of the vote. Out of the 232 seats filled through direct election, the CCM won 206.

On 31 October 2010, Jakaya Kikwete was reelected president with 61% of the vote, while CCM obtained 186 out of the 239 directly elected seats.

CCM was admitted into the Socialist International as a full member at the SI's spring congress on 4–5 February 2013.

On 30 October 2015 John Magufuli of CCM won the election with 58% of the vote, to date the lowest vote share claimed by the CCM or its predecessors.

In the 2020 Tanzanian general election, incumbent president and CCM nominee for president John Magufuli secured reelection with over 84% of the vote, making it the party's largest victory ever since the multi-party system was introduced in 1992. However, the election was held in the midst of significant democratic backsliding and repression, as Magufuli's presidency was characterized by unprecedented attacks on the opposition, civil society and press.

== Leadership ==
=== Current leaders ===
Samia Suluhu Hassan is the current Chairperson of the Chama Cha Mapinduzi following the death of John Pombe Magufuli, the former Chairman and President of United Republic of Tanzania.

=== National leaders ===
- Chairwoman: Samia Suluhu Hassan
- Vice Chairman Zanzibar: Hussein Mwinyi
- Vice Chairman Mainland: Stephen Wasira
- Secretary General: Asha-Rose Migiro
- Deputy Secretary General Zanzibar: Mohammed Mohammed
- Deputy Secretary General Mainland: Anamringi Macha
- Secretary for Organisation: Issa Ussi
- Secretary for Party Ideology and Publicity: Amoss Makalla
- Secretary for Party Affairs and International Relations: Ambassador Rabiah
- Secretary for Economic Affairs and Finance: Dr. Frank George Haule Hawassi
- Secretary General Wazazi – Ally hapi
- Secretary General UWT – Jokate Mwegelo
- Secretary General UVCCM – Jokate U. Mwegelo

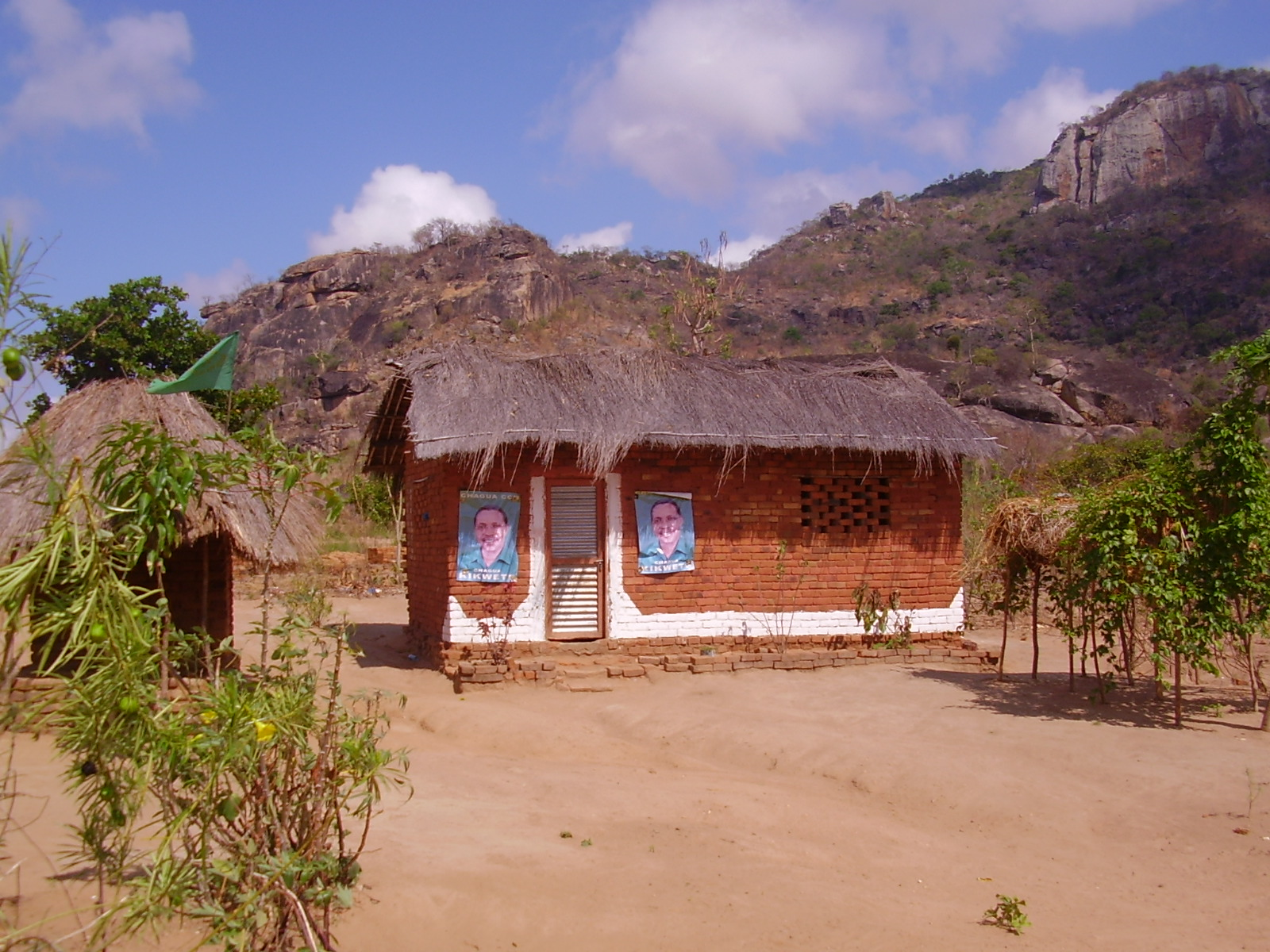
The party has a strong political base in rural Tanzania.

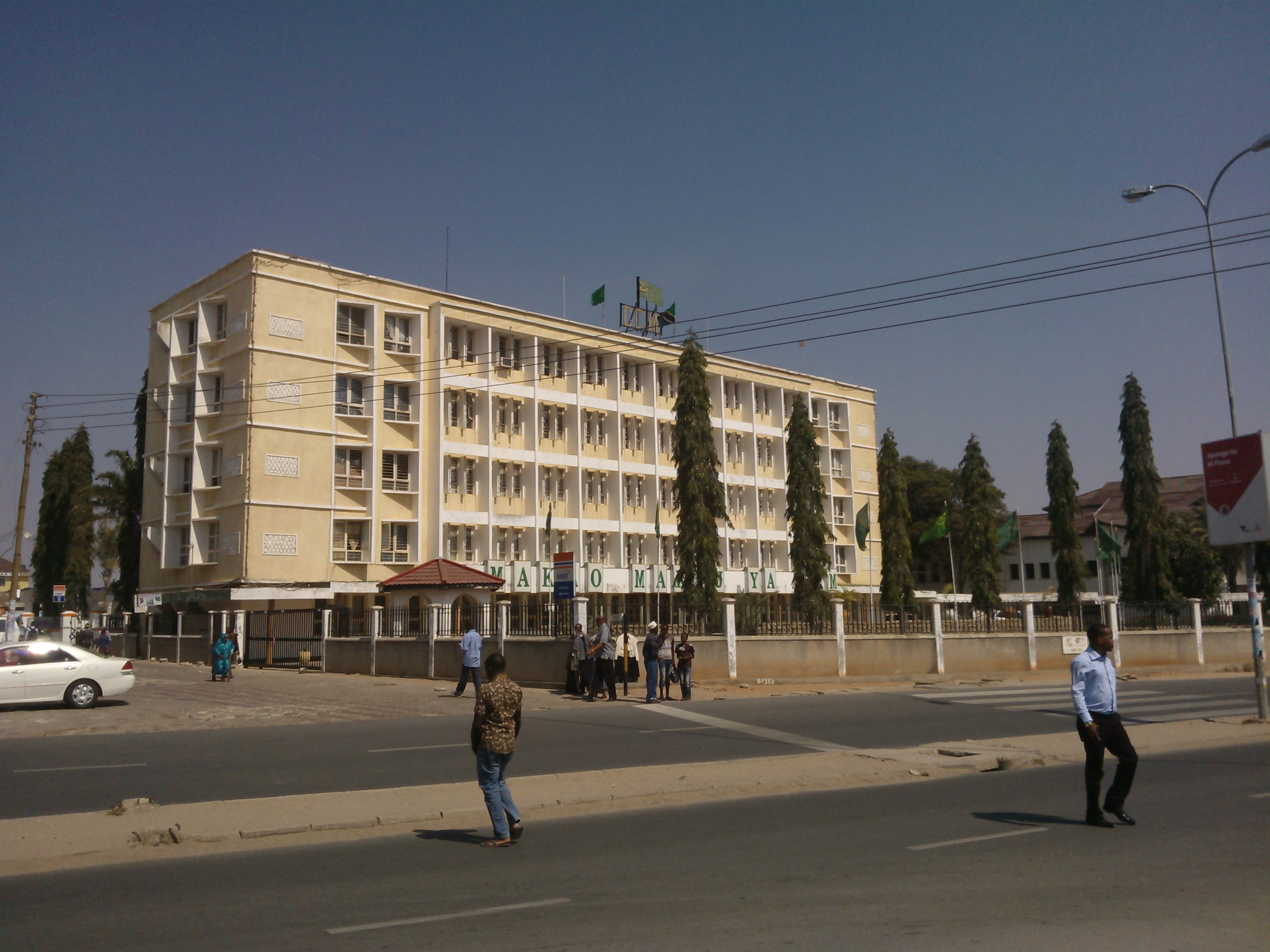
CCM Headquarters in the capital, Dodoma.

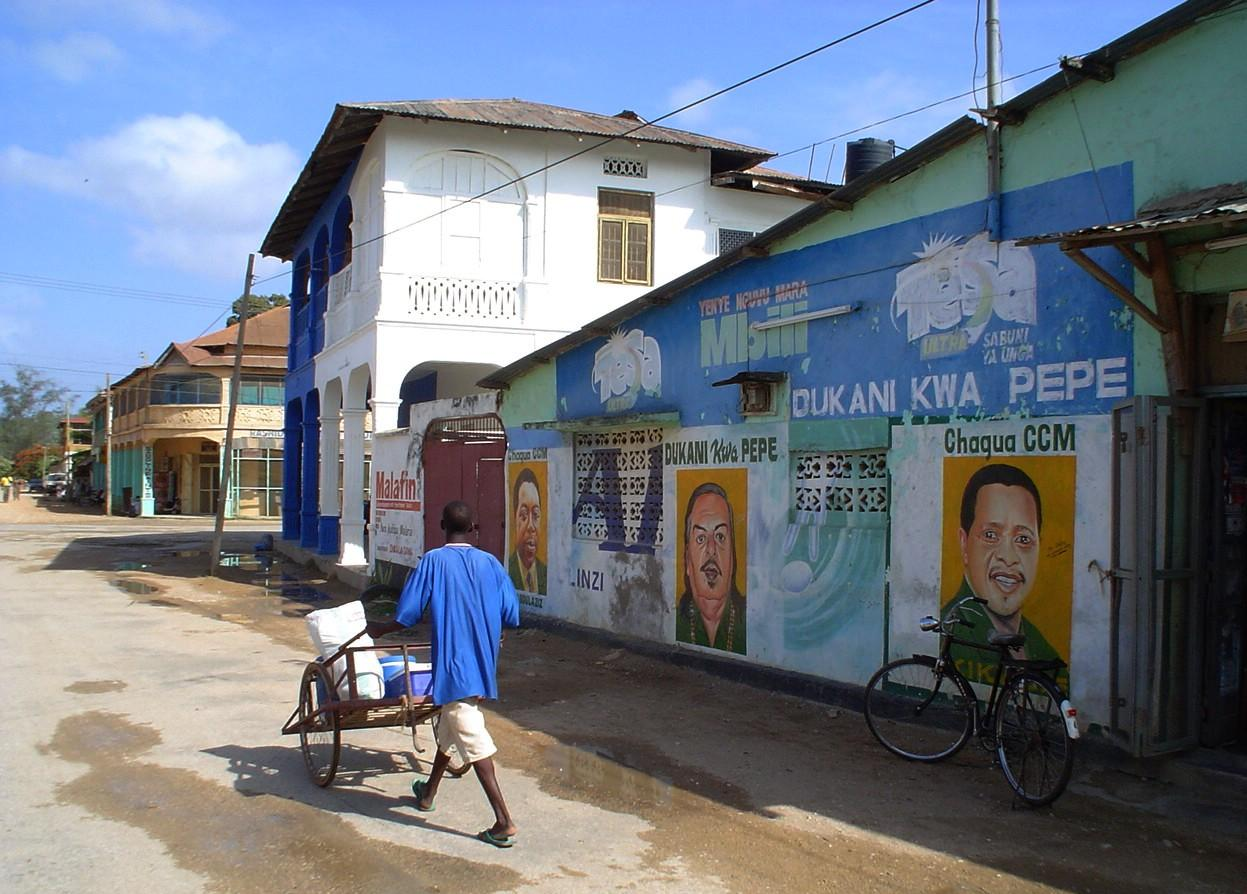
A mural of the party's candidates in the southern Tanzanian town of Lindi.

National Chairman

| Name | Tenure |
|---|---|
| Julius Nyerere | 1977–1990 |
| Ali Hassan Mwinyi | 1990-1996 |
| Benjamin Mkapa | 1996–2006 |
| Jakaya Kikwete | 2006–2016 |
| John Magufuli | 2015–2021 |
| Samia Suluhu Hassan | 2021–present |

National Vice Chairman (Mainland)

| Name | Tenure |
|---|---|
| John Malecela | |
| Pius Msekwa | 2007–2012 |
| Philip Mangula | 2012–2022 |
| Abdulrahman Omar Kinana | 2022–2025 |
| Stephen Wasira | 2025 – present |

National Vice Chairman (Zanzibar)

| Name | Tenure |
|---|---|
| Salmin Amour | |
| Amani Abeid Karume | ? – 2012 |
| Ali Mohamed Shein | 2012–present |

Secretaries General

| Name | Tenure |
|---|---|
| Pius Msekwa | 1977–1982 |
| Rashidi Kawawa | 1982–1990 |
| Horace Kolimba | 1990–1995 |
| Lawrence Gama | 1995–1997 |
| Philip Mangula | 1997–2007 |
| Yusuf Makamba | 2007–2011 |
| Wilson Mukama | 2011–2012 |
| Abdulrahman Kinana | 2012 – May 2018 |
| Bashiru Ally | 2018 – April 2021 |
| Daniel Chongolo | 2021 – present |

== Electoral history ==
=== Presidential elections ===
| Election | Party candidate | Votes | % | Result |
|---|---|---|---|---|
| 1980 | Julius Nyerere | 5,570,883 | 95.5% | Elected ✓ |
| 1985 | Ali Hassan Mwinyi | 4,778,114 | 95.68% | Elected ✓ |
| 1990 | Ali Hassan Mwinyi | 5,198,120 | 97.78% | Elected ✓ |
| 1995 | Benjamin Mkapa | 4,026,422 | 61.82% | Elected ✓ |
| 2000 | Benjamin Mkapa | 5,863,201 | 71.74% | Elected ✓ |
| 2005 | Jakaya Kikwete | 9,123,952 | 80.28% | Elected ✓ |
| 2010 | Jakaya Kikwete | 5,276,827 | 62.83% | Elected ✓ |
| 2015 | John Magufuli | 8,882,935 | 58.46% | Elected ✓ |
| 2020 | John Magufuli | 12,516,252 | 84.40% | Elected ✓ |
| 2025 | Samia Suluhu Hassan | 31,913,866 | 97.66% | Elected ✓ |

=== Bunge elections ===
| Election | Party leader | Votes | % | Seats | +/– | Position | Government |
|---|---|---|---|---|---|---|---|
| 1980 | Julius Nyerere | 5,417,099 | 100% | 264 / 264 | New | 1st | Sole legal party |
| 1985 | Ali Hassan Mwinyi | 4,768,997 | 100% | 274 / 274 | ▲10 | 1st | Sole legal party |
| 1990 | Ali Hassan Mwinyi | 5,007,027 | 100% | 264 / 264 | ▼10 | 1st | Sole legal party |
| 1995 | Benjamin Mkapa | 3,814,206 | 59.22% | 214 / 285 | ▼50 | 1st | Supermajority |
| 2000 | Benjamin Mkapa | 4,628,127 | 65.19% | 243 / 295 | ▲29 | 1st | Supermajority |
| 2005 | Jakaya Kikwete | 7,579,897 | 69.99% | 264 / 323 | ▲21 | 1st | Supermajority |
| 2010 | Jakaya Kikwete | 4,641,830 | 60.20% | 253 / 357 | ▼11 | 1st | Supermajority |
| 2015 | John Magufuli | 8,166,203 | 55.06% | 260 / 393 | ▲7 | 1st | Supermajority |
| 2020 | John Magufuli | 8,830,791 | 75.65% | 350 / 393 | ▲90 | 1st | Supermajority |
| 2025 | Samia Suluhu Hassan | N/A | N/A | 383 / 403 | ▲33 | 1st | Supermajority |
