= Magufuli cabinets =

2015 cabinet of Tanzania

Magufuli Cabinet
- 5th Cabinet of Tanzania

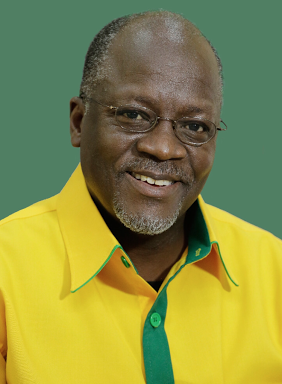
- Date established: 14 December 2015
- Date dissolved: 17 March 2021

Leadership and composition
- Head of state: John Magufuli
- Head of government: John Magufuli
- No. of ministers: 24
- Member party: CCM
- Status in legislature: Majority
- Opposition party: ACT-Wazalendo; CUF; CHADEMA

Formation and history
- Elections: 2015 general election 2020 general election
- Legislature term: 5 years
- Predecessor: Kikwete Cabinet
- Successor: Suluhu Cabinet

The Magufuli Cabinet was formed by President of Tanzania John Magufuli after taking the oath of office on 5 November 2015. Magufuli won the 2015 general election with 58% of the vote in a tightly contested race against ex-CCM Chadema rival Edward Lowassa. After being sworn in on 5 November 2015, Magufuli announced his cabinet almost a month later, on 10 December 2015. He reduced the cabinet to 19 ministers from 30 in the previous cabinet. The Second Cabinet's tenure was cut short on 19 March 2021, following the death of President John Magufuli, and the swearing-in of Samia Suluhu Hassan as the new president.

== First Term ==
=== Inaugural Cabinet ===
Magufuli's running mate during the 2015 general election was Samia Suluhu; his victory secured Tanzania's first female Vice President of Tanzania. His next appointment was Kassim Majaliwa for the post of Prime Minister.

Party key
Chama Cha Mapinduzi

Cabinet of Tanzania: 5 November 2015 – 7 October 2017
Portrait	Portfolio	Incumbent
	President; Commander-in-chief of the Armed Forces	John Magufuli
	Vice President	Samia Suluhu
	President of Zanzibar (Semi-autonomous region)	Ali Mohamed Shein
	Prime Minister	Kassim Majaliwa MP
	Ministers of State in the President’s Office; Regional Administration, Local Government, Civil Service and Good Governance	George Simbachawene MP
	Ministers of State in the President’s Office; Regional Administration, Local Government, Civil Service and Good Governance	Angellah Kairuki MP
	Minister of State in the Vice President’s Office; Union Affairs and Environment	January Makamba MP
	Minister of State in the Prime Minister's Office; Policy, Parliamentary Affairs, Labour, Employment, Youth and the Disabled	Jenista Mhagama MP
	Minister of Agriculture, Livestock and Fisheries	Charles Tizeba MP
	Minister of Constitutional Affairs and Justice	Harrison Mwakyembe MP
	Minister of Defence and National Service	Hussein Mwinyi MP
	Minister of Education, Science, Technology and Vocational Training	Joyce Ndalichako MP
	Minister of Energy and Minerals	Sospeter Muhongo MP
	Minister of Finance and Planning	Philip Mpango MP
	Minister of Foreign Affairs, E.A.C., Regional and International Cooperation	Augustine Mahiga MP
	Minister of Health, Community Development, Gender, Seniors and Children	Ummy Mwalimu MP
	Minister of Home Affairs	Mwigulu Nchemba MP
	Minister of Industry, Trade and Investment	Charles Mwijage MP
	Minister of Information, Culture, Artists and Sports	Nape Nnauye MP
	Minister of Lands, Housing and Human Settlements	William Lukuvi MP
	Minister of Natural Resources and Tourism	Jumanne Maghembe MP
	Minister of Water and Irrigation	Gerson Lwenge MP
	Minister of Works, Transport and Communication	Makame Mbarawa MP
Also attending Cabinet meetings (excluding voting rights)
	Attorney General	George Masaju

==== Changes ====
- Charles Kitwanga was replaced on 21 May 2016 as the minister of home affairs after he attended a parliamentary session under the influence of alcohol.
- Nape Nnauye was relieved of his duty on 23 March 2017 from the post of Minister of Information, Culture, Artists and Sports. Harrison Mwakyembe the Minister of Justice and constitutional affairs at the time took his position and was replaced by Palamagamba John Aidan Mwaluko Kabudi.
- Sospeter Muhongo was suspended on 24 May 2017 as the Minister of Energy and Minerals after he was implicated in the mineral saga report. His position remained vacant until the first cabinet reshuffle of October 2017.

=== Cabinet Reshuffle ===
Magufuli conducts his first major reshuffle on 7 October 2017 increasing the number of ministries from 19 to 21. The biggest change was the splitting of the Ministry of Energy and Minerals into two separate ministries. Furthermore, the Ministry of Agriculture, Livestock & Fisheries was split into two, one being the Ministry of Agriculture and the other being the Ministry of Livestock & Fisheries.

Party key
Chama Cha Mapinduzi

Cabinet of Tanzania: 7 October 2017 - July 14, 2020
Portrait	Portfolio	Incumbent
	President; Commander-in-chief of the Armed Forces	John Magufuli
	Vice President	Samia Suluhu
	President of Zanzibar (Semi-autonomous region)	Ali Mohamed Shein
	Prime Minister	Kassim Majaliwa MP
	Ministers of State in the President’s Office; Regional Administration, Local Government, Civil Service and Good Governance	George Mkuchika MP
	Ministers of State in the President’s Office; Regional Administration, Local Government, Civil Service and Good Governance	Selemani Jafo MP
	Ministers of State in the President’s Office; Regional Administration, Local Government, Civil Service and Good Governance	Angellah Kairuki MP
	Minister of State in the Vice President’s Office; Union Affairs and Environment	Mussa Zungu MP
	Minister of State in the Prime Minister's Office; Policy, Parliamentary Affairs, Labour, Employment, Youth and the Disabled	Jenista Mhagama MP
	Minister of Agriculture	Japhet Hasunga MP
	Minister of Livestock and Fisheries	Luhaga Mpina MP
	Minister of Constitutional Affairs and Justice	Mwigulu Nchemba MP
	Minister of Defence and National Service	Hussein Mwinyi MP
	Minister of Education, Science, Technology and Vocational Training	Joyce Ndalichako MP
	Minister of Energy	Medard Kalemani MP
	Minister of Minerals	Doto Biteko MP
	Minister of Finance and Planning	Philip Mpango MP
	Minister of Foreign Affairs, E.A.C., Regional and International Cooperation	Palamagamba Kabudi MP
	Minister of Health, Community Development, Gender, Seniors and Children	Ummy Mwalimu MP
	Minister of Home Affairs	George Simbachawene MP
	Minister of Industry, Trade and Investment	Innocent Bashungwa MP
	Minister of Information, Culture, Artists and Sports	Harrison Mwakyembe MP
	Minister of Lands, Housing and Human Settlements	William Lukuvi MP
	Minister of Natural Resources and Tourism	Hamisi Kigwangalla MP
	Minister of Works, Transport and Communication	Isack Aloyce Kamwelwe MP
	Minister of Water and Irrigation	Makame Mbarawa MP
Also attending Cabinet meetings (excluding voting rights)
	Attorney General	Adelardus Kilangi

==== Changes ====
- George Masaju was promoted to a Judge at the High Court of Tanzania and the Adelardus Kilangi was appointed as the new Attorney General on February 1, 2020.
- Mwigulu Nchemba was replaced by Alphaxard Kangi Lugola as the minister of home affairs on 30 June 2018.
- Charles Mwijage was replaced by Joseph Kakunda as the minister of industry, trade and investment on 10 November 2018 by the president following a national cashew nut price saga.
- Charles Tizeba was replaced by Japhet Hasunga as the minister of Agriculture on 10 November 2018 following a national cashew nut price saga.
- Angellah Kairuki was appointed to a new position under the Minister of State in the President’s Office for investments, Doto Biteko took over as the new Minister of Minerals on January 9, 2019.
- Augustine Mahiga the Minister of Foreign Affairs and Palamagamba Kabudi the Minister of Justice had their appoints switched on March 3, 2019
- Joseph Kakunda was replaced by Innocent Bashungwa as the minister of Industry, Trade and Investment on June 8, 2019.
- January Makamba was replaced by George Simbachawene as the new Minister of State in the Vice President's Office on 21 July 2019.
- Alphaxard Lugola was replaced by George Simbachawene as the Minister of Home affairs and Mussa Zungu replaced Simbachawene as the Minister of State in the Vice President's Office on January 23, 2020.
- Mwigulu Nchemba was reinstated into the cabinet as the Ministry of Constitutional and Legal Affairs following the death of Augustine Mahiga on May 2, 2020.

== Second Term ==
Following Magufuli's reelection in the 2020 Tanzanian general election, Magufuli unveiled his new cabinet on December 5, 2020. In total, the cabinet includes a docket of 23 ministers, up 1 from his previous cabinet. The ministry of Works, Transport and Communications was broken out into two, The Ministry of Works & Transport and the other being the Ministry of Communications and ICT. This cabinet ended its tenure following the death of President John Magufuli.

Party key
Chama Cha Mapinduzi

Cabinet of Tanzania: 5 December 2020 - 19 March 2021
Portrait	Portfolio	Incumbent
	President; Commander-in-chief of the Armed Forces	John Magufuli
	Vice President	Samia Suluhu
	President of Zanzibar (Semi-autonomous region)	Hussein Mwinyi
	Prime Minister	Kassim Majaliwa MP
	Ministers of State in the President’s Office; Regional Administration, Local Government, Civil Service and Good Governance	George Mkuchika MP
	Ministers of State in the President’s Office; Regional Administration, Local Government, Civil Service and Good Governance	Selemani Jafo MP
	Ministers of State in the President’s Office; Regional Administration, Local Government, Civil Service and Good Governance	Kitila Mkumbo MP
	Minister of State in the Vice President’s Office; Union Affairs and Environment	Ummy Mwalimu MP
	Minister of State in the Prime Minister's Office; Policy, Parliamentary Affairs, Labour, Employment, Youth and the Disabled	Jenista Mhagama MP
	Minister of Agriculture	Adolf Mkenda MP
	Minister of Livestock and Fisheries	Mashimba Ndaki MP
	Minister of Constitutional Affairs and Justice	Mwigulu Nchemba MP
	Minister of Defence and National Service	Elias John Kwandikwa MP
	Minister of Education, Science, Technology and Vocational Training	Joyce Ndalichako MP
	Minister of Energy	Medard Kalemani MP
	Minister of Minerals	Doto Biteko MP
	Minister of Finance and Planning	Philip Mpango MP
	Minister of Foreign Affairs, E.A.C., Regional and International Cooperation	Palamagamba Kabudi MP
	Minister of Health, Community Development, Gender, Seniors and Children	Dorothy Gwajima MP
	Minister of Home Affairs	George Simbachawene MP
	Minister of Industry and Trade	Geofrey Mwambe MP
	Minister of Information, Culture, Artists and Sports	Innocent Bashungwa MP
	Minister of Lands, Housing and Human Settlements	William Lukuvi MP
	Minister of Natural Resources and Tourism	Damas Ndumbaro MP
	Minister of Works and Transport	Leonard Chamuriho MP
	Minister of Water and Irrigation	Jumaa Aweso MP
	Minister of Communication & ICT	Faustine Ndugulile MP
Also attending Cabinet meetings (excluding voting rights)
	Attorney General	Adelardus Kilangi
