= Mbuamaji =

National Historic Site of Tanzania

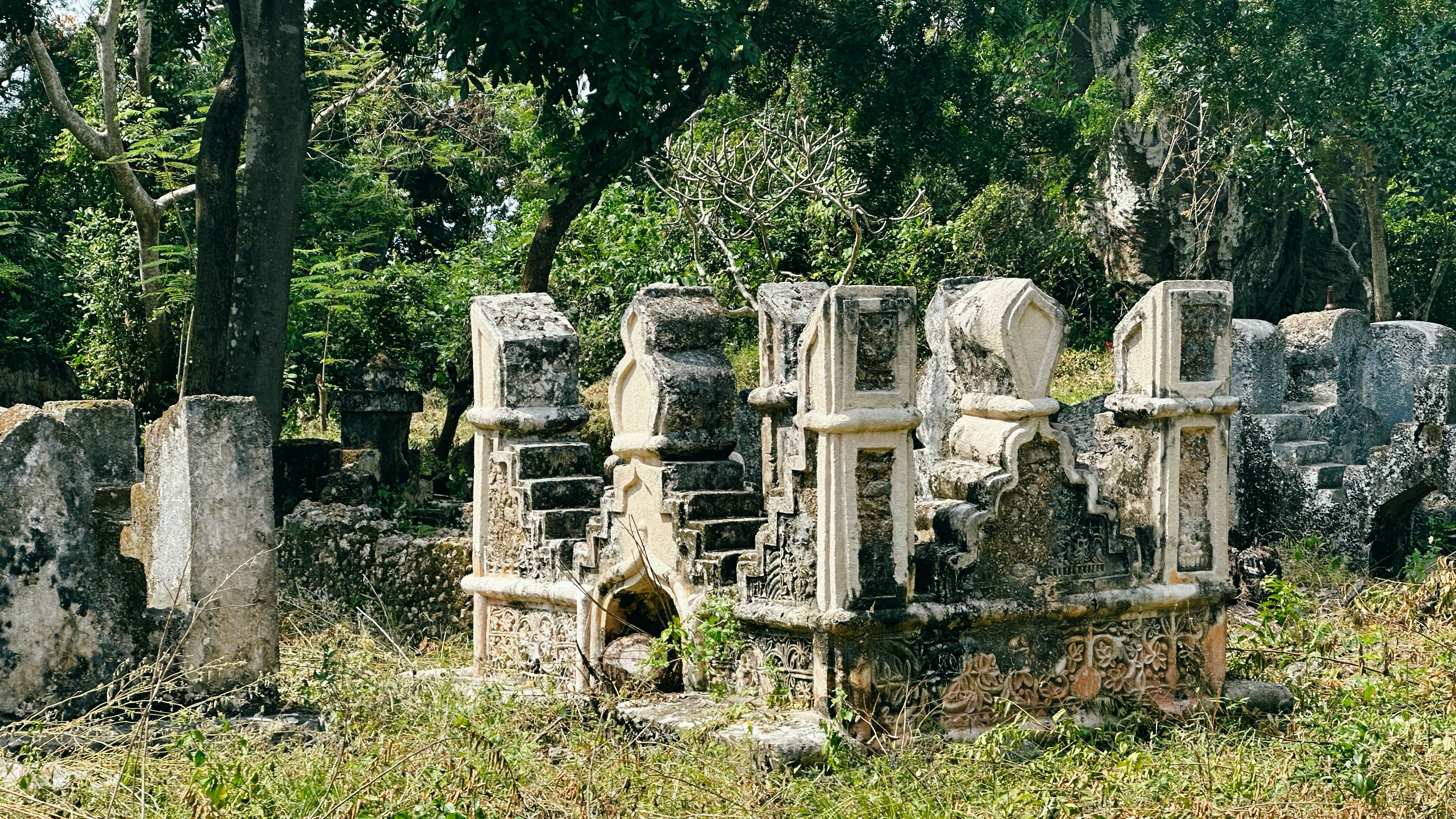
- Tombs at Mbuamaji Ruins of Kigamaboni

- Location within Tanzania
- 6°51′55.44″S 39°25′0.48″E
- Type: Settlement
- Cultures: Swahili
- Location: Somangila ward, Kigamboni District, Dar es Salaam Region, Tanzania

History
- Built: 12th century CE
- Abandoned: 18th century CE

Site notes
- Material: Coral rag
- Architectural styles: Swahili & Islamic
- Condition: Endangered
- Owner: Tanzanian Government
- Management: Antiquities Division under the Ministry of Natural Resources and Tourism

National Historic Sites of Tanzania
- Official name: Mbuamaji Ruins Historic Site
- Type: Cultural
- Currently neglected and vandalized

Mbuamaji or sometimes spelled Mbwamaji (Swahili: Magofu ya mji wa kale wa Mbuamaji) is a Medieval Swahili, National Historic Site located in Somangila ward of Kigamboni District in Dar es Salaam Region of Tanzania. Despite years of neglect that resulted in vandalism, the Tanzanian government is aiming to start restoration efforts as soon as possible.

== History ==
Due to a lack of archaeological research, literary sources have historically dominated the history of the Mbuamaji site. Despite the site's proximity to the Indian Ocean, little progress has been made in determining how this site contributed to the political and socioeconomic growth of the ancient East African Swahili coast. Because it is not referenced or described in ancient historical texts like Diodorus de Siculus, Periplus of the Erythraean Sea, and Ptolemy's Geographia, coastal archaeology specialists have ignored the archaeology of this location. The site was also believed to have been inhabited for the first time in the 15th century A.D. and to have flourished until the 19th century A.D.

Lithics, ceramics, shells, beads, daubs, bones, and metal artifacts were discovered during archaeological surface surveys, shovel test pits, and excavations. The survey also listed a variety of Swahili architectural historical sites made of coral stone, rag, and lime. These include ruined homes, tombs, wells, and an old mosque that is still used on Fridays. The Mbuamaji site was inhabited from the Early Iron Working (EIW) of the B.C./A.D. transitional period to Triangular Incised Ware, Plain Ware, and Swahili eras, according to the recovered cultural items. The discovered evidence demonstrates that the Mbuamaji settlement made significant contributions to the trade and interactions that shaped the ancient East African coast.

== Site ==
North of Mbuamaji's old town (Currently called Gezaulole), on the seashore, is where the site is situated. A bulldozer has already damaged a portion of the site as of the early 2010s. There is a significant amount of both foreign and native cultural materials at the location. Dutch replicas of Chinese blue and white ceramics from the 18th and 19th centuries, as well as a Chinese blue and white potsherd, are examples of imported items. Other items include glass, red and white beads, Persian pottery, and red pottery from India that has black stripes painted on it. While some of the native pottery was painted in red or graphite, other pieces featured carved embellishments. The decorated ceramics are from the 12th–13th and 15th–16th centuries, respectively.

A local potsherd was discovered to feature ornamental designs similar to those from Shungubweni and Pemba Mnazi. The abundance of both indigenous and imported cultural items sets the Mbuamaji site apart from all others north of Pemba Mnazi. Therefore, Mbuamaji ought to have been a very prosperous town. There is a rather modern mosque near the site with inscriptions from AH 1017 (1608 AD). Archaeologist Chittick's early research at the location reveals that the inscriptions were likely brought from another mosque because of the mosque's 19th-century Swahili architectural style. The inscriptions may be from an earlier mosque that once stood on the same spot, according to the updated dates for the location.

Mbuamaji Ruins Gallery
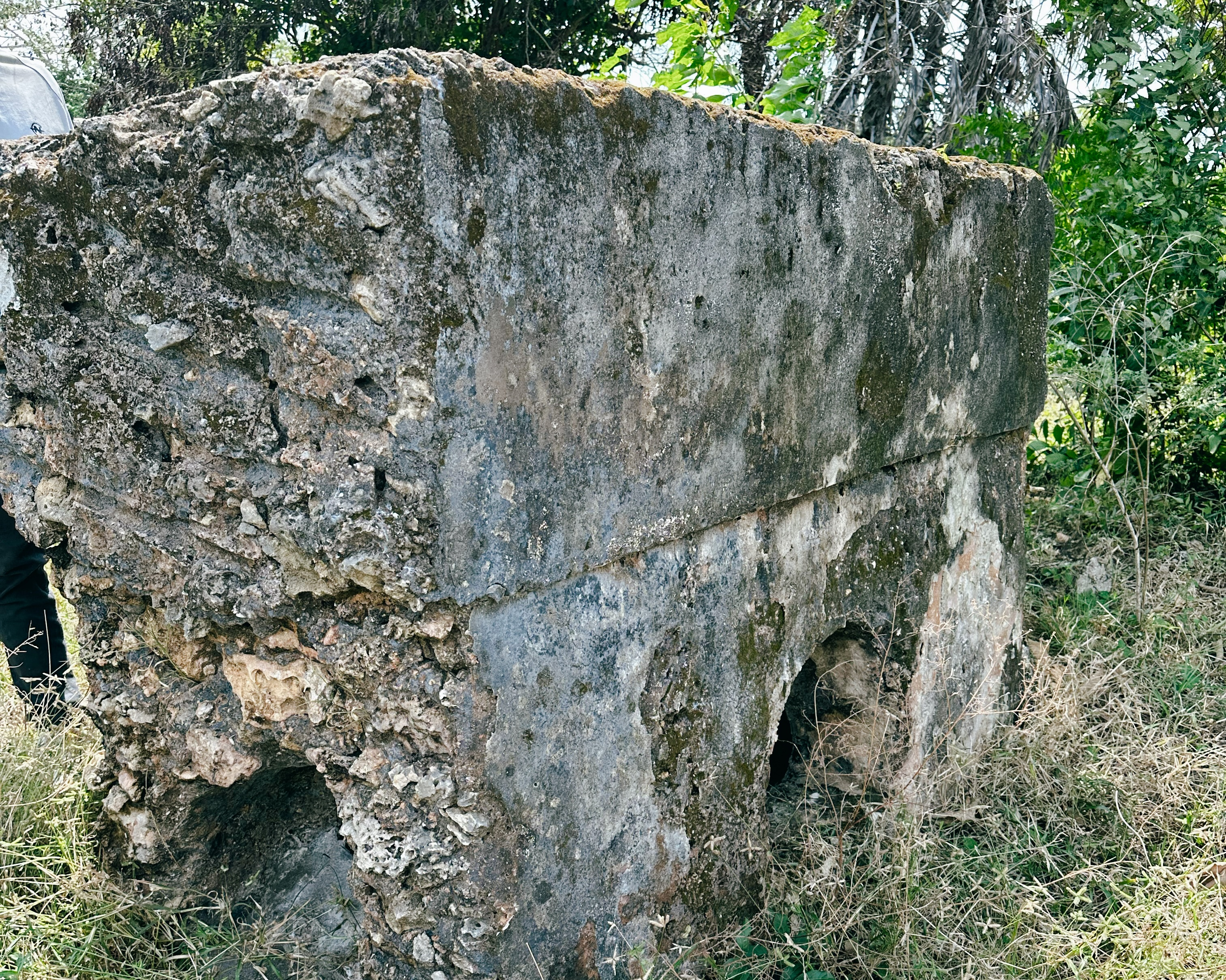
Grave at Mbuamaji Ruins

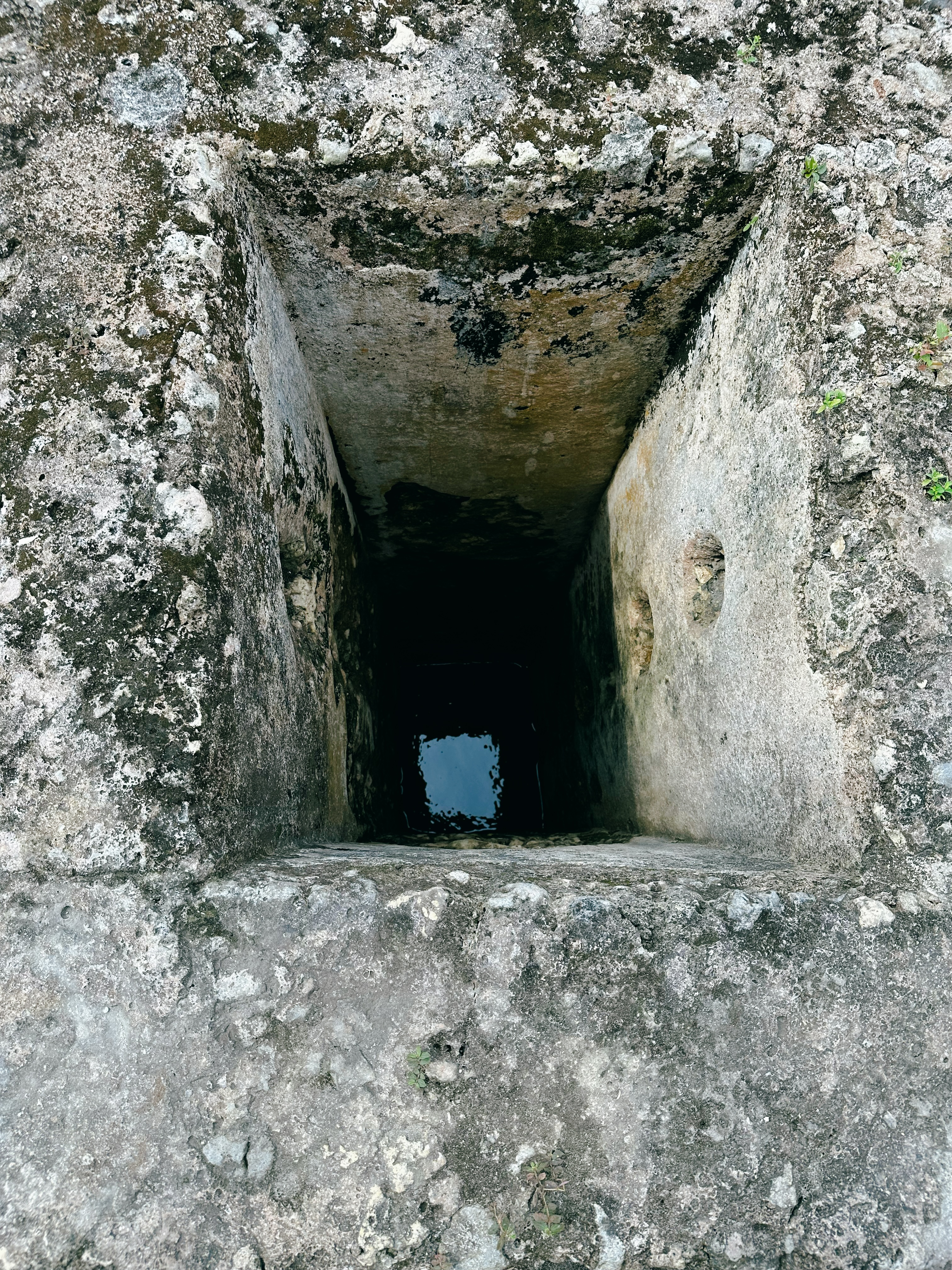
Old well at Mbuamaji Ruins

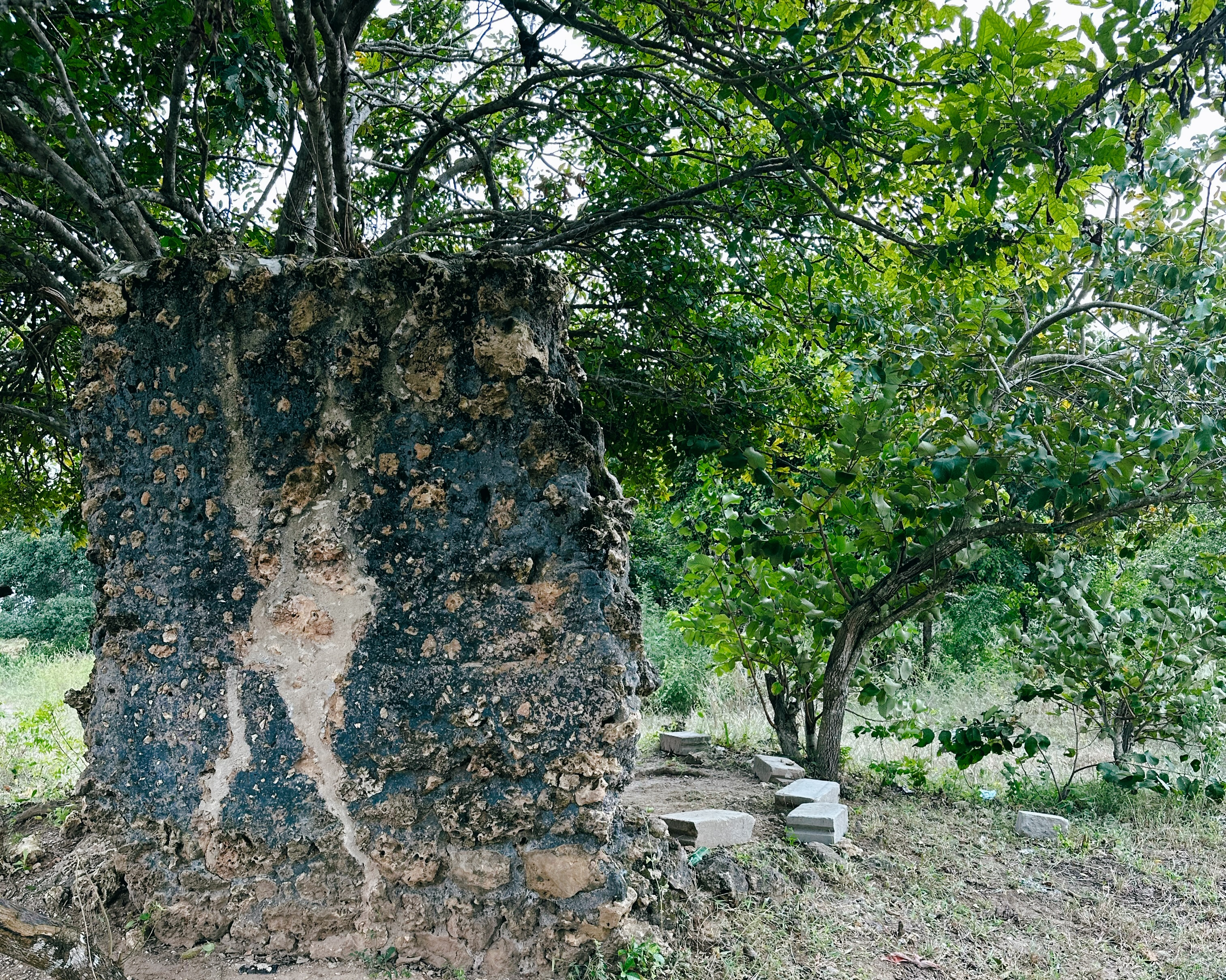
Old mosque ruin at Mbuamaji

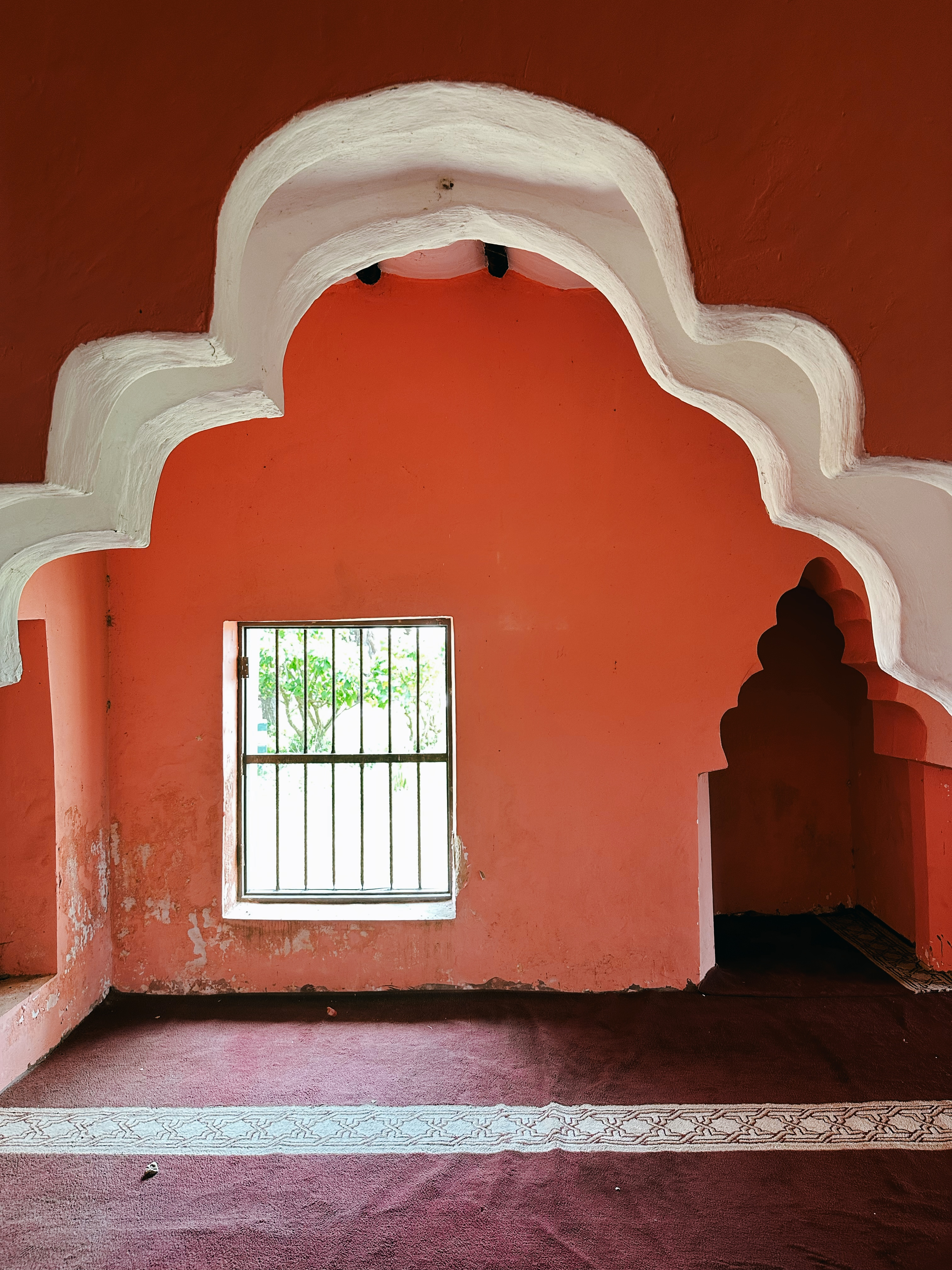
Interior of 19th Century Mosque that has 15th century inscriptions near Mbuamaji Ruins

== See also ==
- Historic Swahili Settlements
- Kaole
- Kunduchi Ruins
- Msuka Mjini Ruins
- Kichokochwe Ruins
- Pujini Ruins
- Kimbiji Ruins
- Mbutu Bandarini
