= Faustine Ndugulile =

Tanzanian politician and public health official (1969–2024)

Honourable Dr Faustine Ndugulile MP

Minister of Communication & ICT
- In office 5 December 2020 – 12 September 2021
- President: Samia Suluhu
- Preceded by: Isack Aloyce Kamwelwe
- Succeeded by: Ashatu Kijaji

Member of Parliament for Kigamboni
- In office November 2010 – 27 November 2024
- Preceded by: Mwinchoum Msomi

Personal details
- Born: 31 March 1969 Mbulu, Tanzania
- Died: 27 November 2024 (aged 55) India
- Party: CCM
- Children: Martha Ndugulile, Melvin Ndugulile
- Education: University of Dar es Salaam (MD), (MMed); University of Western Cape (MPH); Open University of Tanzania (LL.B)
- Profession: Medical doctor

Faustine Engelbert Ndugulile (31 March 1969 – 27 November 2024) was a Tanzanian health official and a politician of Chama Cha Mapinduzi (CCM). He was a member of the National Assembly for the Kigamboni constituency from 2010 until 2024. He obtained his medical degree from the University of Dar es Salaam in 1997 and earned his Master's degree in microbiology and immunology there in 2001. He earned another Master's in public health from the University of Western Cape in 2010. He was appointed deputy minister of the Ministry of Health in 2017 and minister of communication and ICT in 2020. He was nominated as the next regional director of Africa for the World Health Organization (WHO) in August 2024. However, he died on 27 November 2024 while receiving medical treatment in India.

== Early life and education ==
Ndugulile was born on 31 March 1969 in Mbulu, Tanzania. He pursued his medical degree at the University of Dar es Salaam, graduating in 1997. He specialized in public health, focusing on diagnostics and epidemiology. His advanced training included working in regional programmes on African public health issues, further broadening his expertise in health systems management.

He went on to earn master's degrees in microbiology and immunology from the University of Dar es Salaam in 2001, and in public health from the University of Western Cape in Cape Town, South Africa, in 2010.

== Career ==
Ndugulile had a diverse career in medicine, public health, and politics. He began as a public health physician and rose to prominent leadership roles, including Assistant Director of Diagnostic Services in Tanzania. He also served as Programme Manager for Blood Safety, where he led nationwide initiatives to improve the quality and accessibility of diagnostic and transfusion services.

On the international stage, he worked with the US Centers for Disease Control and Prevention as a Resident Adviser in South Africa, contributing to regional health systems and epidemic response planning.

In 2010, Ndugulile transitioned to politics, becoming the Member of Parliament for Kigamboni Constituency. His legislative focus included health policy, technology, and infrastructure.

Ndugulile was appointed Deputy Minister of the Ministry of Health, Community Development, Gender, Elders and Children (Tanzania) by the President of the United Republic of Tanzania, John Pombe Joseph Magufuli in October 2017.

After the 2020 Tanzanian general election, on 5 December 2020, in Magufuli's second cabinet he was appointed the first Minister of Communication & ICT, a newly created ministry.

== WHO leadership ==
In August 2024 he was nominated as the next Regional Director for the World Health Organization (WHO) African Region.

== Death ==
Ndugulile died on 27 November 2024, at the age of 55, while undergoing medical treatment in India for an unspecified illness. He had been due to take his position in the WHO in February 2025.
