= Ministry of Minerals =

Ministry of Mining
- Wizara ya Madini (Swahili)

Ministry overview
- Preceding Ministry: Ministry of Energy and Minerals
- Jurisdiction: Tanzania
- Headquarters: Kikuyu Road, Dodoma; 6°48′55″S 39°17′31″E
- Minister responsible: Doto Biteko
- Deputy Minister responsible: Hon. Prof. Shukrani Manya
- Ministry executive: Professor Simon Samwel Msanjila, Permanent Secretary
- Website: madini.go.tz

The Ministry of Mining is the government ministry of United Republic of Tanzania that is responsible for facilitating the development of the Mining sectors as separated with the Ministry of Energy during the mini-reshuffle to the Cabinet done by the President of the United Republic of Tanzania, John Pombe Magufuli.
