= Stanslaus Nyongo =

Tanzanian politician

Honourable Stanslaus Haroon Nyongo MP

Member of Parliament for Maswa District
- Incumbent
- Assumed office December 2015

Deputy Minister of Minerals
- President: John Magufuli
- Succeeded by: Shukrani Manya

Personal details
- Born: 1 September 1973 (age 52)
- Party: Chama Cha Mapinduzi

Stanslaus Haroon Nyongo (born September 1, 1973) is a Tanzanian politician and a member of the Chama Cha Mapinduzi political party. He was elected MP representing Maswa District since 2015 and was a Deputy Minister of Minerals until December 2020.
