= Ministry of Community =

- Ministry of Community and Social Services (Ontario) in Canada
- Ministry of Community Development, Gender and Children in Tanzania
- Ministry of Community Development, Youth and Sports in China
- Ministry of Community Safety and Correctional Services in Canada
