= Ministry of Energy (Tanzania) =

Government ministry of Tanzania

- Wizara ya Nishati (Swahili)

Ministry overview
- Formed: 2017
- Preceding Ministry: Ministry of Energy and Minerals
- Jurisdiction: Tanzania
- Headquarters: Kikuyu Road, Dodoma; 6°48′55″S 39°17′31″E
- Minister responsible: DR. Medard Kalemani
- Deputy Minister responsible: Stephen Byabato
- Ministry executive: Khamis Mwinyimvua, Permanent Secretary
- Website: www.nishati.go.tz

The Ministry of Energy is responsible for facilitating the development of the energy sectors in Tanzania.

== History ==
The Ministry was formed in 2017 after the preceding ministry, the Ministry of Energy and Minerals, was split by President John Magufuli to improve supervision.

== Recent ==
As of September 1 2023, the ministry has been headed by Hon. Dkt Doto Mashaka Biteko, who is the Deputy Prime Minister and Minister of Energy, Hon. Judith Salvio Kapinga as the Deputy Minister for Energy and Engl. Felschemi Jossen Mramba as the Permanent Secretary.
