= Mbutu Bandarini =

National Historic Site of Tanzania

Mbutu Bandarini Ruins
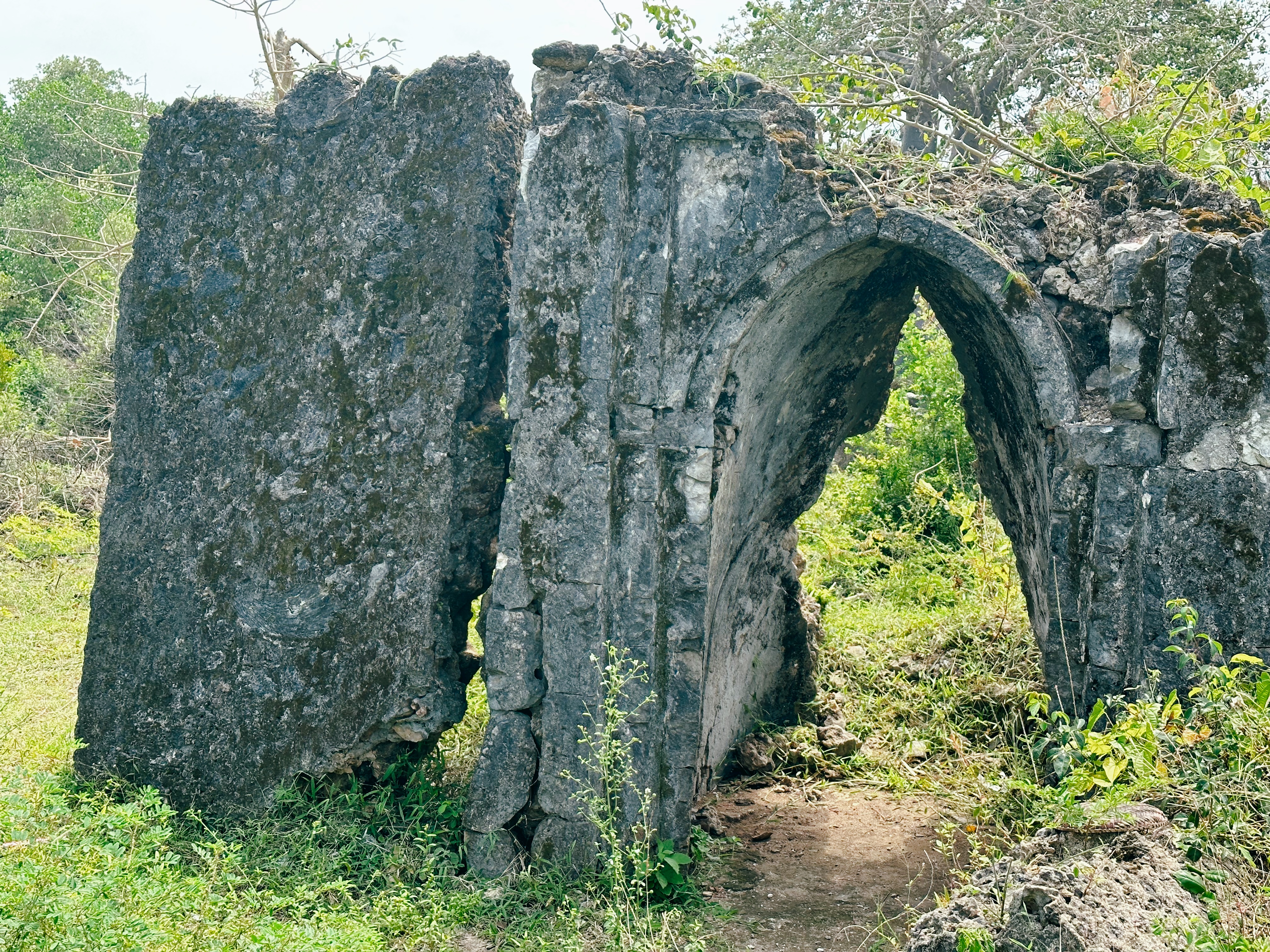
- Mbutu Bandarini Mosque ruin in Somangila ward of Kigamboni

- Location within Tanzania
- 6°52′26.07″S 39°28′18.6″E
- Type: Settlement
- Cultures: Swahili
- Location: Somangila ward, Kigamboni District, Dar es Salaam Region, Tanzania

History
- Built: 14th century CE
- Abandoned: 18th century CE

Site notes
- Material: Coral rag
- Architectural styles: Swahili & Islamic
- Condition: Endangered
- Owner: Tanzanian Government
- Management: Antiquities Division under the Ministry of Natural Resources and Tourism

National Historic Sites of Tanzania
- Official name: Bandarini Ruins Historic Site
- Type: Cultural
- Currently neglected and vandalized

Mbutu Bandarini Ruins (Swahili: Magofu ya mji wa kale wa Mbutu Bandarini) is a Medieval Swahili, National Historic Site located in Somangila ward of Kigamboni District in Dar es Salaam Region of Tanzania. Despite years of indifference that led to vandalism of the site, the Tanzanian government has contracted a firm to begin repair operations as soon as feasible.

== Site ==
The site is situated near the Bandarini River delta, close to the seashore, about 2.5 km east of the settlement of Mwongozo in Somangila ward. The site featuring ruined buildings and a mosque's ruins in stones. There is a graveyard and an old well close to the mosque. The mosque at the location is thought to have been constructed during the 14th and 15th centuries A.D. On the surface of the site, there are significant concentrations of native pottery. Chinese celadon from the 15th century, Chinese blue on white, and European porcelain from the 18th century are among the imports found at the location. Heavy layers of indigenous pottery between 0 and 60 cm below the surface were found in a test pit.

Mbutu Bandarini Ruins Gallery
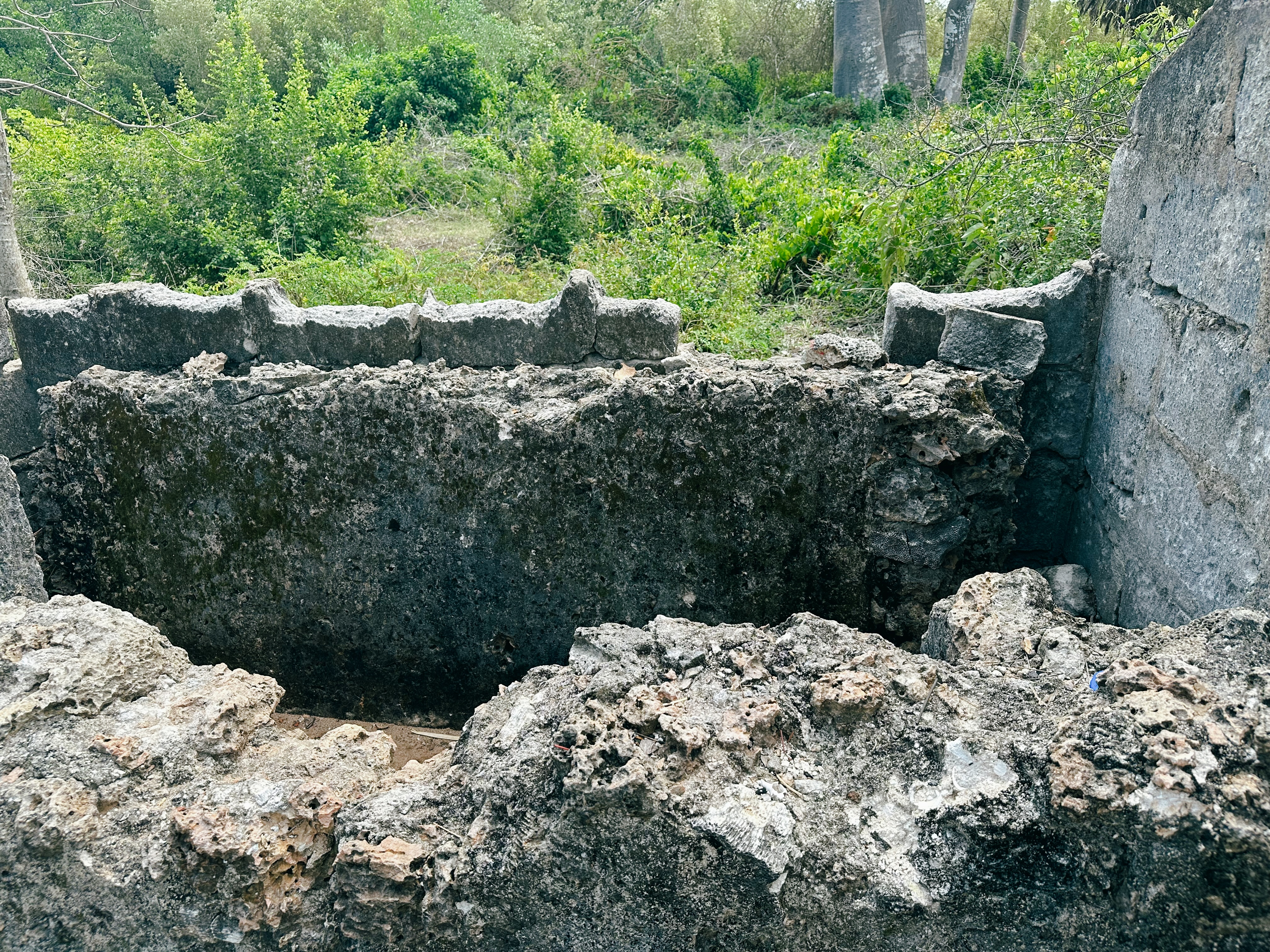
Tomb at Mbutu Bandarini Ruins

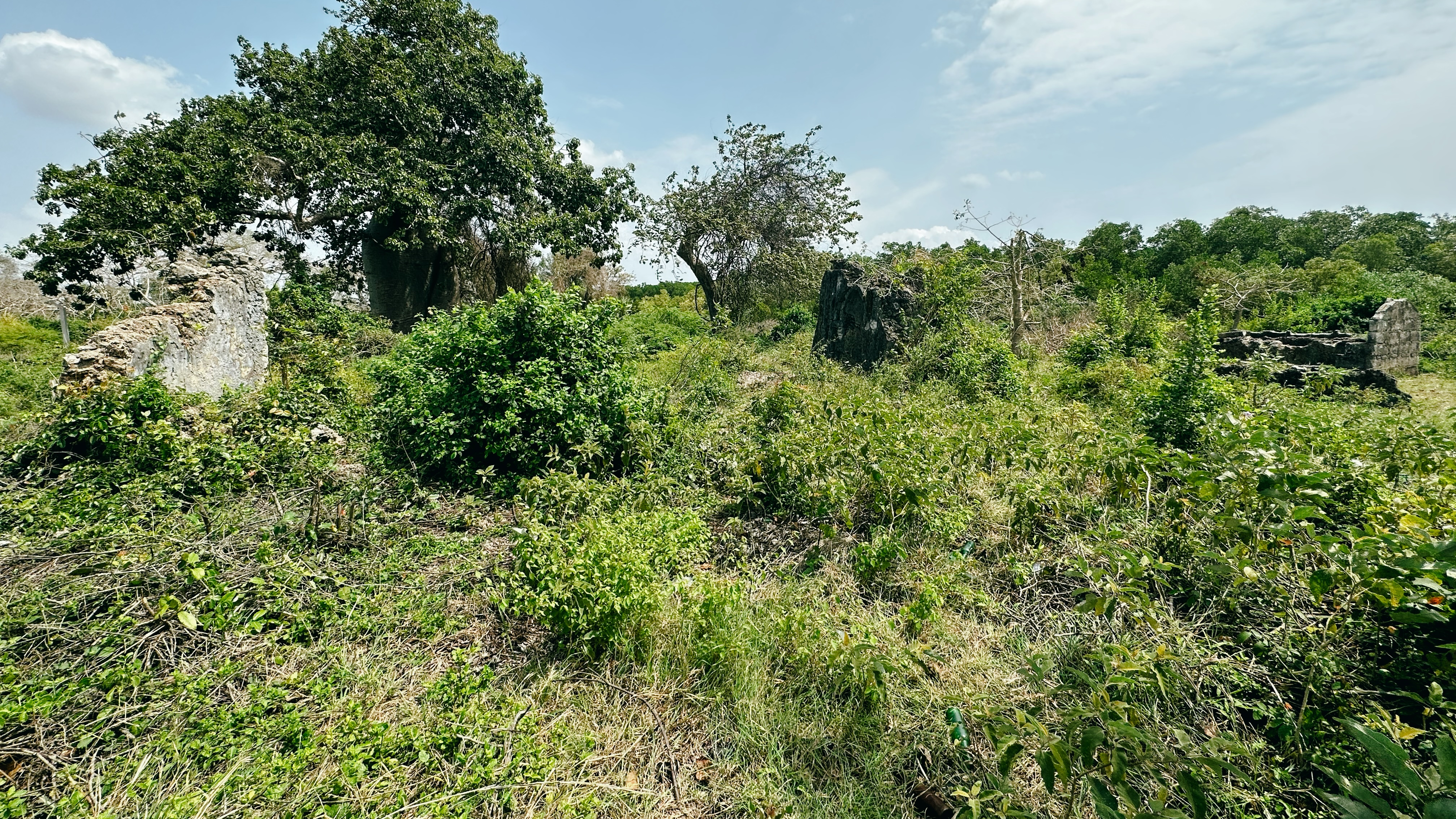
Scene at Mbutu Bandarini Ruins

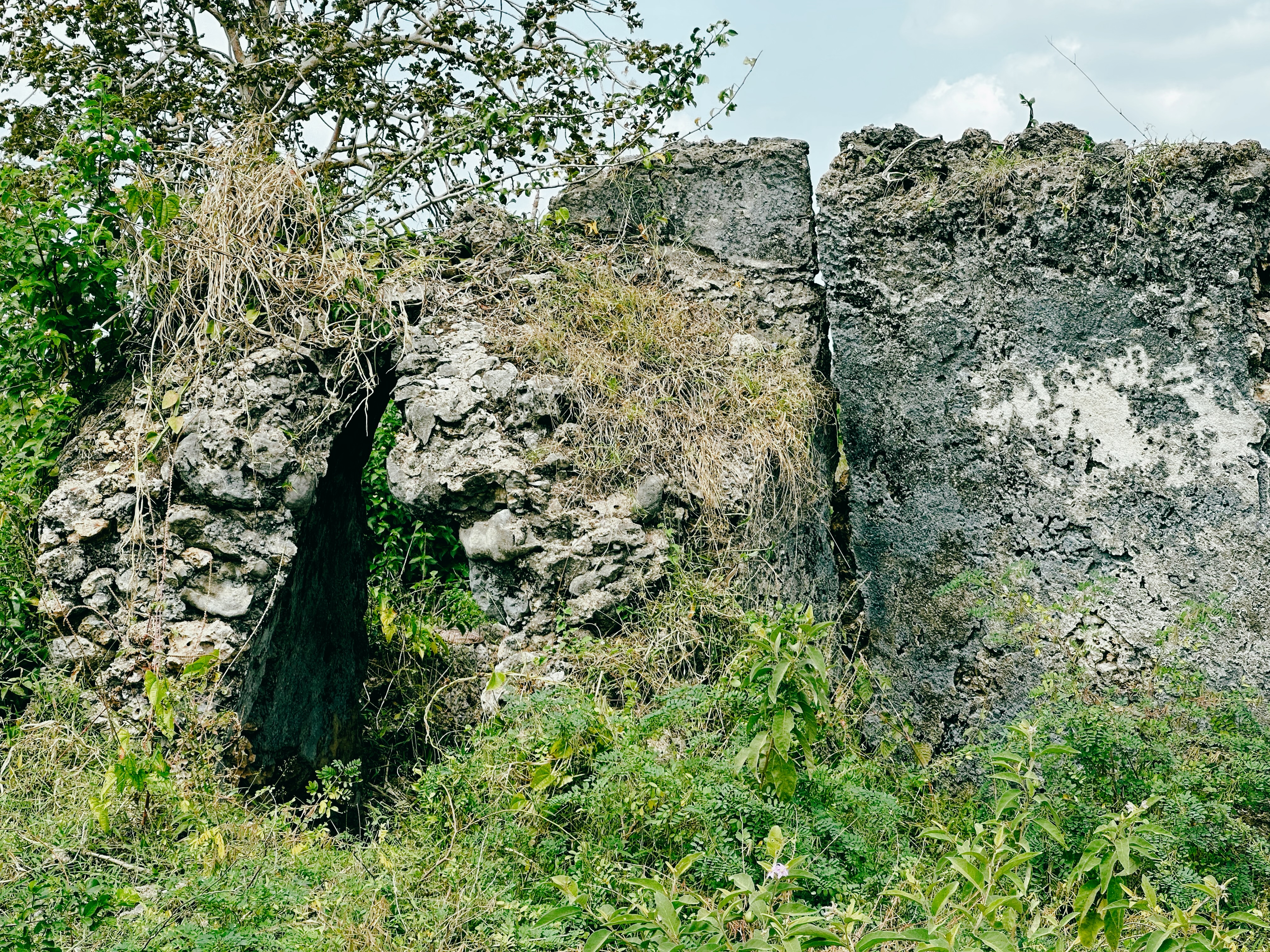
Whats left of the old mosque at Mbutu Bandarini Ruins

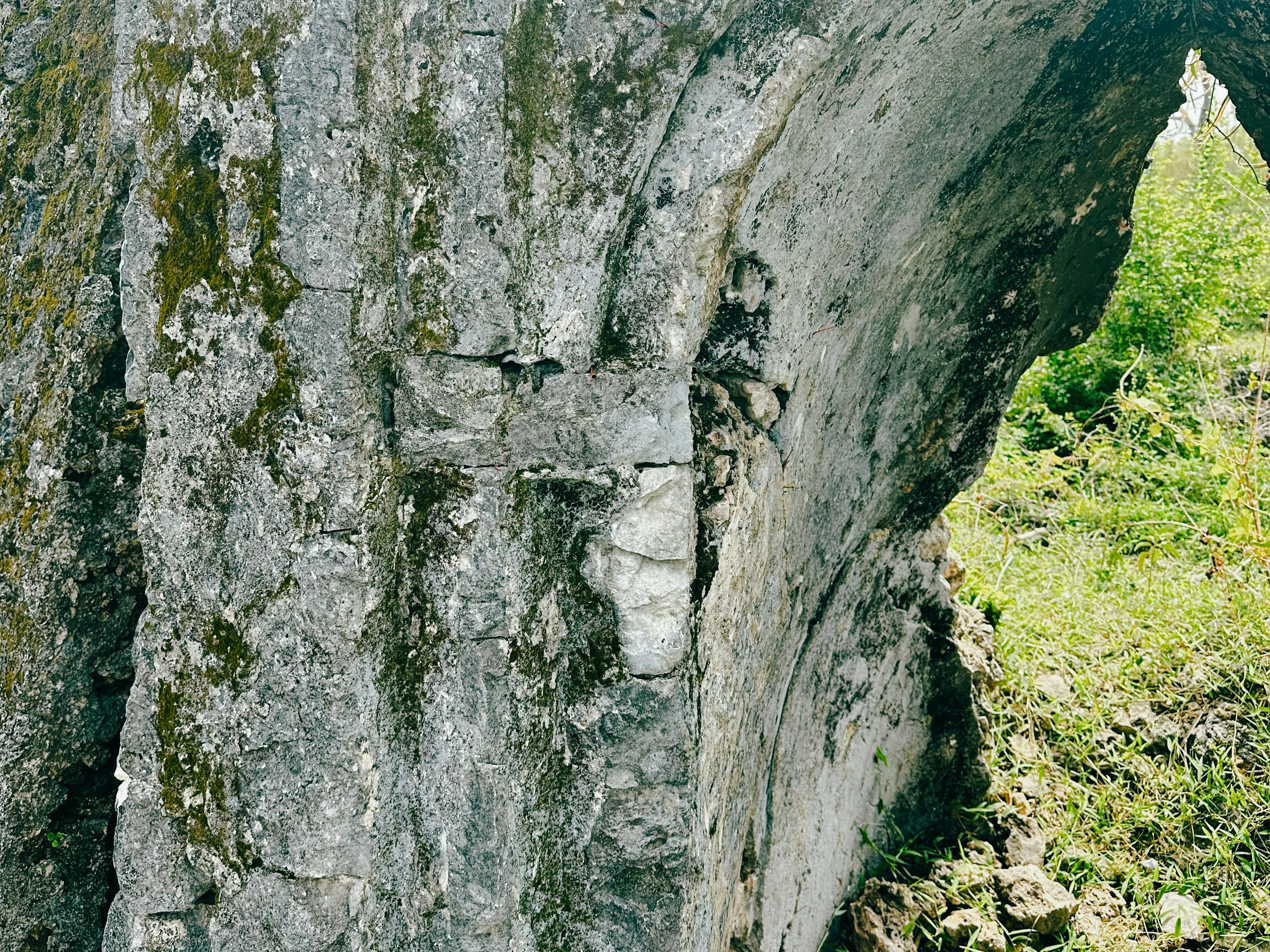
Detail of the coral stone that was used to shape the old mosque's mihrab

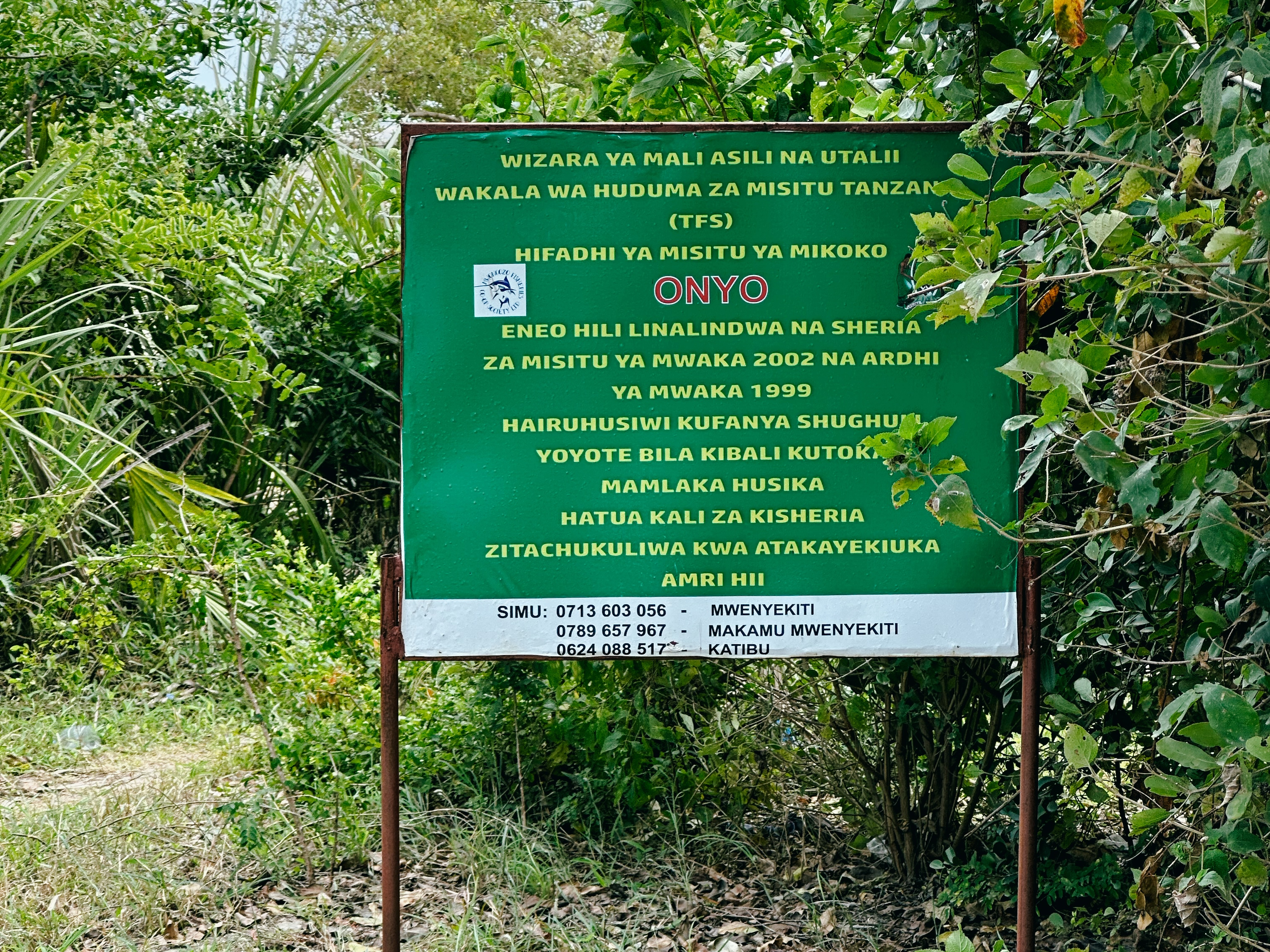
Tanzania Forest Service Agency's signage next to the Mbutu Bandarini Ruins.

== See also ==
- Historic Swahili Settlements
- Kaole
- Kunduchi Ruins
- Msuka Mjini Ruins
- Kichokochwe Ruins
- Pujini Ruins
- Kimbiji Ruins
