= Tanzanian Maritime Cultural Heritage Unit =

Conservation agency of the Tanzanian government

Agency overview
- Formed: 2009; 17 years ago
- Jurisdiction: Tanzania
- Headquarters: Dodoma; Dodoma Region; Tanzania
- Parent agency: Ministry of Natural Resources and Tourism

Tanzanian Maritime Cultural Heritage (Swahili: Urithi wa Bahari ya Watanzania) is a marine conservation department under the Tanzanian government's Ministry of Natural Resources and Tourism. The programme was established in order to empower Tanzanian conservationists and create the Tanzanian Maritime Cultural Heritage Unit, the Tanzania Maritime and Underwater Cultural Heritage Programme was launched in 2009. The program provides participants with knowledge and skills, among other things, to enable them to record, document, and keep an eye on underwater cultural heritage locations along the Tanzanian coast. The TMUCH team has carried out numerous initiatives in Zanzibar and Kilwa Kisiwani with the help of both technical and financial aid from the CIE-Centre for International Heritage Activities, UNESCO, and the Netherlands Government.
