= Doto Biteko =

Tanzanian politician

Right Honourable Doto Biteko MP

Deputy Prime Minister of Tanzania
- Incumbent
- Assumed office 1 September 2023
- President: Samia Suluhu
- Preceded by: Augustino Mrema

Minister of Energy
- Incumbent
- Assumed office 1 September 2023
- President: Samia Suluhu
- Preceded by: January Makamba

Minister of Minerals
- In office 9 January 2019 – 31 August 2023
- President: John Magufuli (2019-2021); Samia Suluhu (2021-2023)
- Preceded by: Angellah Kairuki
- Succeeded by: Anthony Mavunde

Member of Parliament for Bukombe
- Incumbent
- Assumed office December 2015

Personal details
- Born: 30 December 1978 (age 47)
- Party: Chama Cha Mapinduzi
- Education: St. Augustine University of Tanzania; University of Dodoma (PhD)

Doto Mashaka Biteko (born December 30, 1978) is a Tanzanian politician and a member of the Chama Cha Mapinduzi political party. He was elected MP representing Bukombe in 2015.

He was appointed as the Minister of Minerals on 9 January 2019 by President John Magufuli. He continued his tenure as the Minister of Minerals under the new president Samia Suluhu Hassan until 31 August 2023. On 1 September 2023, he was promoted in the role of Deputy Prime Minister of Tanzania, only the third ever person to hold the title. At the same time, he was given the docket as the Minister of Energy.
