= Stanley Kevela =

Tanzanian politician

Honourable Stanley Kevela

Member of the Tanzanian Parliament
- In office 2005–2010
- Succeeded by: Gerson Lwenge
- Constituency: Njombe West

Personal details
- Born: 13 December 1963 (age 62) Tanganyika
- Party: CCM
- Education: UDSM (MBA)

Stanley Jilaoneka Yono Kevela is a Member of Parliament in the National Assembly of Tanzania. Kevela was elected during the last Tanzanian parliamentary elections in 2005 on the ticket of the governing Chama Cha Mapinduzi party and represents the Njombe West area of the Njombe District of the Iringa Region of the country. He has been quoted in the media as speaking in favor of increasing the level of higher education in the Njombe district and against stigmatising people with HIV/AIDS.
