= Hamisi Kigwangalla =

Tanzanian politician

The Honourable Hamisi Kigwangalla MP
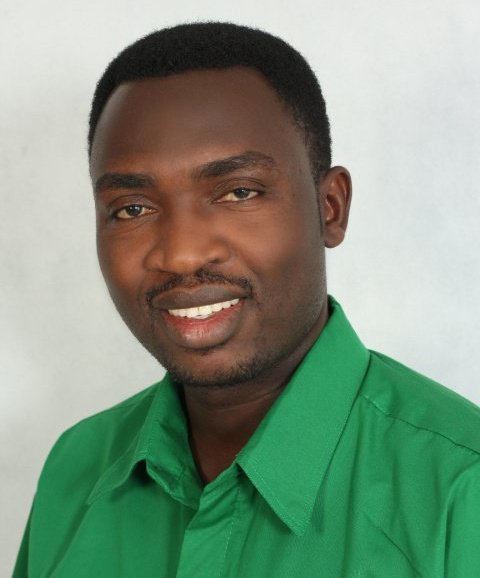

Minister of Natural Resources and Tourism
- In office 7 October 2017 – 16 June 2020
- Preceded by: Jumanne Maghembe
- Succeeded by: Damas Ndumbaro

Member of Parliament for Nzega Rural
- Incumbent
- Assumed office November 2010
- Preceded by: Lucas Selelii

Personal details
- Born: 7 August 1975 (age 51) Nzega District, Tabora Region, Tanzania
- Party: CCM
- Spouse: Dr. Bayoum Awadhi Kigwangalla
- Children: Sheila Kahabi Kigwangalla, Hawa Siasa Kigwangalla, Hamisi Silanda Kigwangalla Jr., Zulfa Khairat Kigwangalla and Nasser Mahampa Kigwangalla II.
- Education: Muhimbili University (M.D.); Karolinska Institutet (M.P.H.); Blekinge Institute (MBA); Abo Akademi University (Ph.D.); University of Cape Town (Ph.D. Cand.)
- Profession: Medical Doctor Public Health Scientist Public Policy Expert
- Website: www.hkgroup.co.tz

Hamisi Andrea Kigwangalla Hamisi Andrea Kigwangalla (born 7 August 1975) is a Tanzanian physician, statesman, and businessman. He served as a Member of Parliament representing Nzega constituency (2010–2015) and Nzega Rural constituency (2015–2025) under the Chama Cha Mapinduzi (CCM) party. He served as Deputy Minister for Health, Community Development, Gender, Elderly and Children (2015–2017) and subsequently as Minister of Natural Resources and Tourism (2017–2020).

== Early life and education ==
Hamisi Andrea Kigwangalla was born on 7 August 1975. His father was a banker with the Tanzanian National Bank of Commerce. His mother, Bagaile Bakari Lumola (a retired CCM employee), was a primary school teacher in Nzega Ndogo Primary School, in Nzega, where his father was posted to open a new branch of the bank.

Kigwangalla's father, Nasser Mahampa Kigwangalla, descends from a well-known Kimbu clan from Goweko – Igalula, and his mother was the daughter of a Nyamwezi Chief, Lumola Bakari Maulid (a key figure in Kigwangalla's upbringing following the divorce of his parents at a young age). His maternal grandfather attended Tabora School a few years ahead of former Tanzanian president, Julius Nyerere.

He was educated at Kigoma and Shinyanga secondary schools before joining the University of Dar es Salaam where he pursued a degree in medicine from 1999, until he completed it in 2004. He then pursued postgraduate studies in Sweden at the Blekinge Institute of Technology (M.B.A.) and Karolinska Institutet (M.P.H.). He completed a Ph.D. thesis in Public Health (Health Systems and Health Economics) at the University of Cape Town (South Africa).

== Career ==
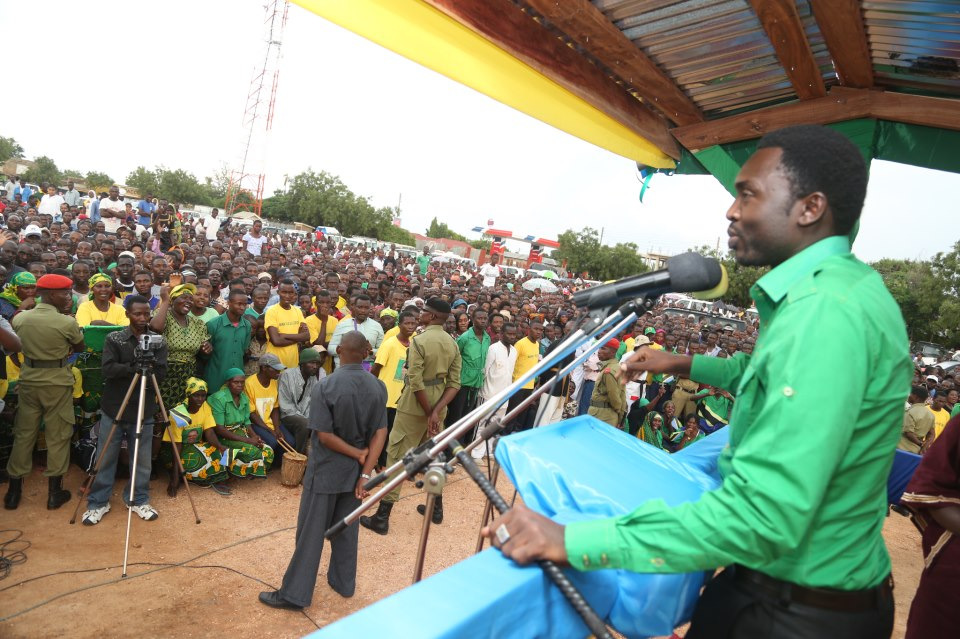
Addressing a rally at his constituency

Kigwangalla was first elected to the National Assembly in October 2010, representing Nzega constituency. He served as Chairman of the Parliamentary Standing Committee on Regional Administration and Local Government from 2013 to 2015. Following the 2015 general elections, he was re-elected to represent the newly formed Nzega Rural constituency.

He was appointed Deputy Minister for Health, Community Development, Gender, Elderly and Children in November 2015, serving until October 2017. He was subsequently appointed Minister of Natural Resources and Tourism, serving from October 2017 to June 2020. During his ministerial tenure, Tanzania’s national parks estate expanded to 22 national parks. He was associated with wildlife management policy reforms and the “Tanzania: Unforgettable!” tourism rebranding campaign. He represented Tanzania at multiple international forums including CITES Conferences of the Parties, the UN World Tourism Organization General Assemblies, and the World Travel Market in London and ITB Berlin. He served as Chairman of both the EAC Council of Ministers for Wildlife, Environment and Tourism and the SADC Council of Ministers for Wildlife, Natural Resources and Tourism.

Kigwangalla holds a Doctor of Medicine (MD) from the University of Dar es Salaam (1999–2004), a Master of Public Health (MPH) from Karolinska Institutet, Sweden, and a Master of Business Administration (MBA) from Blekinge Institute of Technology, Sweden. He is a PhD candidate in Social Policy at Åbo Akademi University, Finland, where his thesis examines the fairness and legitimacy of budgetary processes in Tanzania’s health system.

He practised as a medical doctor at Muhimbili National Hospital (2004–2005) and subsequently worked as a consultant researcher collaborating with the National Institute for Medical Research (NIMR), FHI, and international universities (2006–2010). He has authored three peer-reviewed publications in journals including PeerJ and the Journal of Medical Ethics, covering topics of child injury epidemiology and HIV priority-setting in Tanzania.

Kigwangalla is Chairman and CEO of HK Group, an agro-industrial and hospitality conglomerate headquartered in Nzega, Tabora Region. The group’s operations span cotton ginning, irrigated rice farming, safari and hospitality, and industrial park development. He is also founder of M-Afya, a digital health insurance platform. He serves on the Private Sector Advisory Panel of the International Cotton Advisory Committee (ICAC) and is a member of the African Cotton and Textiles Industries Federation (ACTIF).

He is a Member of Parliament sitting in the National Assembly representing Nzega constituency of the Tabora region. He was first elected in the national elections on 31 October 2010. His appointment by the national executive council to run for the post through the ruling party Chama Cha Mapinduzi (CCM) ticket was followed by a lot of criticism with critics claiming that he was appointed to contest for the post despite being the second runner up after Hussein Mohamed Bashe (the winner of the primary votes), who was not favoured on account of his citizenship being unclear; and the incumbent Lucas Lumambo Selelii (1st runner up) in the primaries, because he was working for the First Lady of Tanzania's charitable organisation, Wanawake na Maendeleo (WAMA), which he denies.

Immediately after his nomination by the CCM's top congregation, he was also arrested by the immigration police on charges of being a non-citizen of Tanzania and this became a center issue in the Tanzanian media. He was however cleared two days later. Despite the fact that he was cleared by the immigration officials, he still had to face stern objections from the opposition contestants.

Despite criticism and allegations, Kigwangalla won the elections. He was featured in daily newspapers in Tanzania saying that he intends to table a motion in the National Assembly claiming that the Golden Pride Gold Mine, a gold mining project located in Nzega and owned by Australian mining giant subsidiary company Resolute Tanzania Ltd, is useless, has no benefits to people from Nzega and the country at large, and it should be closed. Kigwangalla was re-elected to the Parliament in the October 2015 Tanzanian general elections to represent the Nzega Rural Constituency on a CCM ticket.

Kigwangalla was a vocal defender of the Tanzanian government's crackdown on LGBT rights under president John Magufuli. In an April 2017 interview with BuzzFeed News while serving as deputy health minister, he said he supported the use of anal exams to judge whether someone has had gay sex, despite it being widely considered by medical experts to be a violation of human rights.

== Personal ==
Kigwangalla has authored a policy framework book, Kigwanomics and the Tanzania We Want: From Renaissance to Transformation.
