= Shukrani Manya =

Tanzanian Politician

Honorable Shukrani Elias Manya MP

Deputy Minister of Minerals
- Incumbent
- Assumed office 11 December 2020
- President: John Magufuli
- Preceded by: Stanslaus Nyongo

Member of Parliament
- Incumbent
- Assumed office 11 December 2020
- Appointed by: John Magufuli
- Constituency: None (Nominated MP)

Personal details
- Born: 5 March 1973 (age 53) Ukerewe, Mwanza
- Citizenship: Tanzanian
- Party: Chama Cha Mapinduzi
- Education: University of Dar es Salaam (B.Sc) (M.Sc) (Ph.D) Geology
- Occupation: Teaching; Research
- Profession: Professor, Researcher

Military service
- Allegiance: United Rep. of Tanzania
- Branch/service: National Service
- Years of service: 1992-1993
- Military camp: Buhemba JKT
- Duration: 2 years

Shukrani Elias Manya is a Tanzanian academic Professor and politician belonging to the Chama Cha Mapinduzi political party in Tanzania. He is a Member of Parliament nominated by John Magufuli and was appointed as a deputy minister responsible for mining since December 2020. Before his appointment he was the executive secretary of the Mining Commission in Tanzania.

== See also ==
- Adolf Mkenda – Tanzanian economist and politician
- Tolly Mbwette – Tanzanian academic (1956-2020)
