= Saed Kubenea =

Tanzanian politician

Honourable Saed Ahmed Kubenea MP

Member of Parliament for Ubungo

Founder MwanaHalisi Publishers
- In office December 2015 – November 2020
- Preceded by: John Mnyika
- Succeeded by: Kitila Mkumbo

Personal details
- Party: ACT-Wazalendo
- Other political affiliations: CHADEMA (past)

Saed Ahmed Kubenea is a Tanzanian politician and journalist.

He was elected MP representing Ubungo in 2015. He is also a co-owner of MwanaHalisi Publishing Media.
