= Luhaga Mpina =

Tanzanian politician

Honourable Luhaga Mpina MP
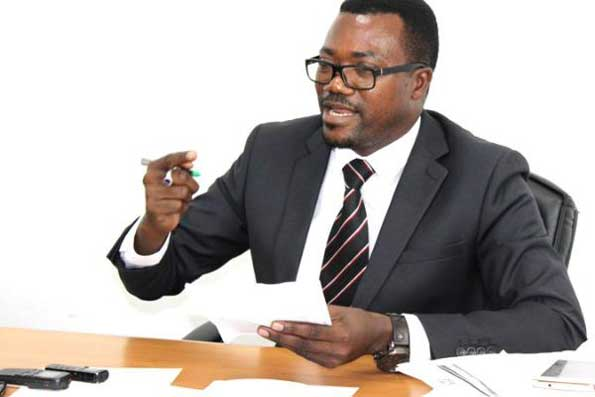

Minister of Livestock and Fisheries
- In office 7 October 2017 – 16 June 2020
- President: John Magufuli
- Preceded by: Charles Tizeba
- Succeeded by: Mashimba Ndaki

Member of Parliament for Kisesa
- Incumbent
- Assumed office December 2005

Personal details
- Born: 5 May 1975 (age 51) Tanzania
- Party: CCM
- Education: Mzumbe University (B.Acc); University of Strathclyde (MSc)

Luhaga Joelson Mpina (born 5 May 1975) is a Tanzanian politician and Member of Parliament for Kisesa constituency since 2005. He was the Minister of Livestock and Fisheries for 3 years in the Magufuli cabinet. In August 2025, he left the ruling Chama Cha Mapinduzi party and joined the Alliance for Change and Transparency. However, he was barred from running for president in the 2025 Tanzanian general election over complaints that the party had failed to comply with nomination procedures in the primaries.
