= Ministry of Community Development, Gender and Children =

- Wizara ya Maendeleo ya Jamii, Jinsia na Watoto (Swahili)

Ministry overview
- Dissolved: 2015
- Superseding Ministry: Ministry of Health, Community Development, Gender, Elders and Children
- Jurisdiction: Tanzania
- Headquarters: Kivukoni Front, Dar es Salaam; 6°49′39″S 39°17′50″E
- Minister responsible: Sophia Simba
- Deputy Minister responsible: Pindi Chana
- Ministry executive: Permanent Secretary
- Website: mcdgc.go.tz

The Ministry of Community Development, Gender and Children was a government ministry of Tanzania. Its mission is to "promote community development, gender equality, equity[,] and children rights through [the] formulation of policies, strategies[,] and guidelines in collaboration with stakeholders active in the country."

== History ==
The ministry was merged under John Magufuli's leadership into the Ministry of Health, Community Development, Gender, Elders and Children.
