= Leonidas Gama =

Tanzania Politician

Honorable Leonidas Tutu Gama MP

Member of Parliament Songea Urban
- In office 2015–2017
- Preceded by: Emmanuel Nchimbi
- Succeeded by: Damas Ndumbaro

Personal details
- Born: 15 September 1959
- Died: 24 November 2017 (aged 58)
- Relatives: Zainab Amir Gama, Lawrence Gama

Leonidas T. Gama (September 15, 1959 - November 24, 2017) was a Tanzanian Chama Cha Mapinduzi politician and civil servant served as District and Regional Commissioner.
