= Ministry of Minerals (Tanzania) =

Government ministry of Tanzania

- Wizara ya Madini (Swahili)

Ministry overview
- Formed: 2017
- Preceding Ministry: Ministry of Minerals
- Jurisdiction: Tanzania
- Headquarters: Kikuyu Avenue, Dodoma; 6°48′55″S 39°17′31″E
- Minister responsible: Hon. Anthony P Mavunde(MP)
- Deputy Minister responsible: Hon. Dr. Steven L Kiruswa(MP)
- Ministry executive: Prof. Simon Msanjila, Permanent Secretary
- Website: www.madini.go.tz

The Ministry of Minerals is the government ministry of Tanzania which is responsible for facilitating the development of the mining sector.

== History ==
The ministry was formed in 2017, when president John Magufuli ordered that the Ministry of Energy and Minerals be separated into two. The president aimed to help focus supervision in two of the most important sectors of the country's economy. Angellah Kairuki was the first minister to serve in the Ministry.
