= Nimrod Mkono =

Tanzanian politician (1943–2023)

Honourable Nimrod Mkono MP
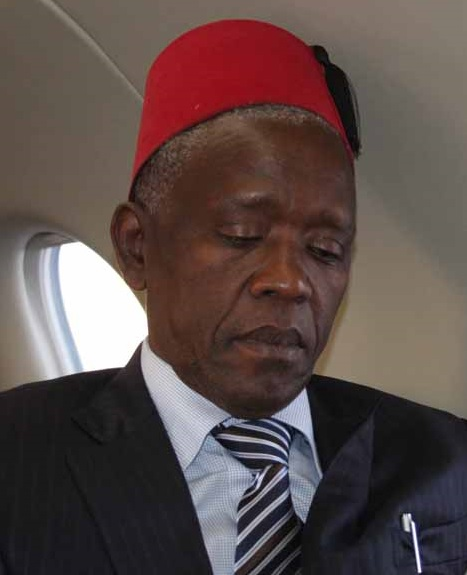

Member of Parliament for Musoma Rural
- In office November 2000 – November 2015
- Succeeded by: Sospeter Muhongo

Personal details
- Born: 18 August 1943 Tanganyika
- Died: 18 April 2023 (aged 79) Florida, U.S.
- Party: CCM
- Relations: Emmanuel Mkono
- Education: University of Dar es Salaam; City of London Polytechnic (MA)

Nimrod Elireheema Mkono (18 August 1943 – 18 April 2023) was a Tanzanian CCM politician and Member of Parliament for Musoma Rural constituency from 2000 to 2015. He was also a practicing advocate in Mkono and advocates and former owner of Bank M. Mkono moved to the United States in 2018 for health care. He died there, in Florida, on 18 April 2023, at the age of 79.
