= Pindi Chana =

Tanzanian politician

Honourable Pindi Chana MP

Minister of Natural Resources and Tourism
- In office 14 August 2024 – 13 November 2025
- President: Samia Suluhu
- Preceded by: Angellah Kairuki
- Succeeded by: Ashatu Kijaji

Minister of Constitutional and Legal Affairs
- In office 1 September 2023 – 14 August 2024
- President: Samia Suluhu
- Preceded by: Damas Ndumbaro
- Succeeded by: Palamagamba Kabudi

Minister of Culture, Arts and Sports
- In office 14 February 2023 – 31 August 2023
- President: Samia Suluhu
- Preceded by: Mohamed Mchengerwa
- Succeeded by: Damas Ndumbaro

Minister of Natural Resources & Tourism
- In office 31 March 2022 – 14 February 2023
- President: Samia Suluhu
- Preceded by: Damas Ndumbaro
- Succeeded by: Mohamed Mchengerwa

Member of Parliament
- Incumbent
- Assumed office November 2005
- President: Jakaya Kikwete 2005-2015; John Magufuli 2015-2021; Samia Suluhu 2021-present
- Constituency: None (Special Seat)

Personal details
- Born: 24 January 1974 (age 52)
- Party: CCM
- Education: Peoples' Friendship University; UDSM (LL.M); Mzumbe University (PhD)

Pindi Hazara Chana (born 24 January 1974) is a Tanzanian CCM politician and a special seat Member of Parliament since 2010. In January 2022 she began her cabinet career as the Minister of State (Policy, Parliamentary Affairs, Labour, Youth, Employment and Persons with Disabilities) in the Prime Minister's Office. Following a mini cabinet re-shuffle on 31 March 2022 Chana assumed the Ministry of Natural Resources & Tourism office. She exchanged positions with Mohamed Mchengerwa following another cabinet reshuffle as the new Minister of Culture, Arts and Sports in February 2023.

Again on 1 September 2023 in Samia Suluhu Hassan's third major cabinet reshuffle, she exchanged dockets with Damas Ndumbaro as the new Minister of Constitutional and Legal Affairs.
