= Mohamed Mchengerwa =

Tanzanian politician

Honourable Mohamed Omary Mchengerwa MP

Ministers of State in the President’s Office for Regional Administration and Local Government
- Incumbent
- Assumed office 1 September 2023
- President: Samia Suluhu
- Preceded by: Angellah Kairuki
- In office 31 March 2021 – 8 January 2022
- President: Samia Suluhu
- Preceded by: Kitila Mkumbo
- Succeeded by: Innocent Bashungwa

Minister of Natural Resources and Tourism
- In office 14 February 2023 – 31 August 2023
- President: Samia Suluhu
- Preceded by: Pindi Chana
- Succeeded by: Angellah Kairuki

Minister of Culture, Artistic and Sports
- In office 10 January 2022 – 14 February 2023
- President: Samia Suluhu
- Preceded by: Innocent Bashungwa
- Succeeded by: Pindi Chana

The Member of Parliament for Rufiji Constituency
- Incumbent
- Assumed office November 2015

Personal details
- Born: 1 September 1979 (age 47)
- Party: Chama Cha Mapinduzi
- Spouse: Wanu Hafidh Ameir
- Relations: Samia Suluhu (Mother-in-law); Hafidh Ameir Hassan (Father-in-law)
- Education: Kampala International University (LLB); University of Dar es Salaam (LLM)

Mohamed Mchengerwa (born September 1, 1979) is a current member of the Tanzanian Cabinet and is a Minister in the president's office in Tanzania. He is a member of the Chama Cha Mapinduzi political party. He was elected MP representing Rufiji in 2015.

== Political career ==
Mchengerwa got his first major cabinet position following the formation of Samia Suluhu Hassan first cabinet on March 31, 2021. He was sworn in as the Minister of State in the Presidents office for Public Service Management and Good Governance. Following the cabinet reshuffle in January 2022, Mchengerwa switched dockets with Innocent Bashungwa and assumed the position of Minister of Culture, Artists and Sports.

In February 2023, he switched dockets with Pindi Chana and became the new Minister of Natural resources and Tourism. In September 2023, in the third cabinet reshuffle, he switched dockets with Angellah Kairuki and assumed a position in the President's office and the minister for Regional Administration and Local Government.
