= Geoffrey Mwambe =

Tanzanian politician

Honorable Geoffrey Idelphonce Mwambe MP
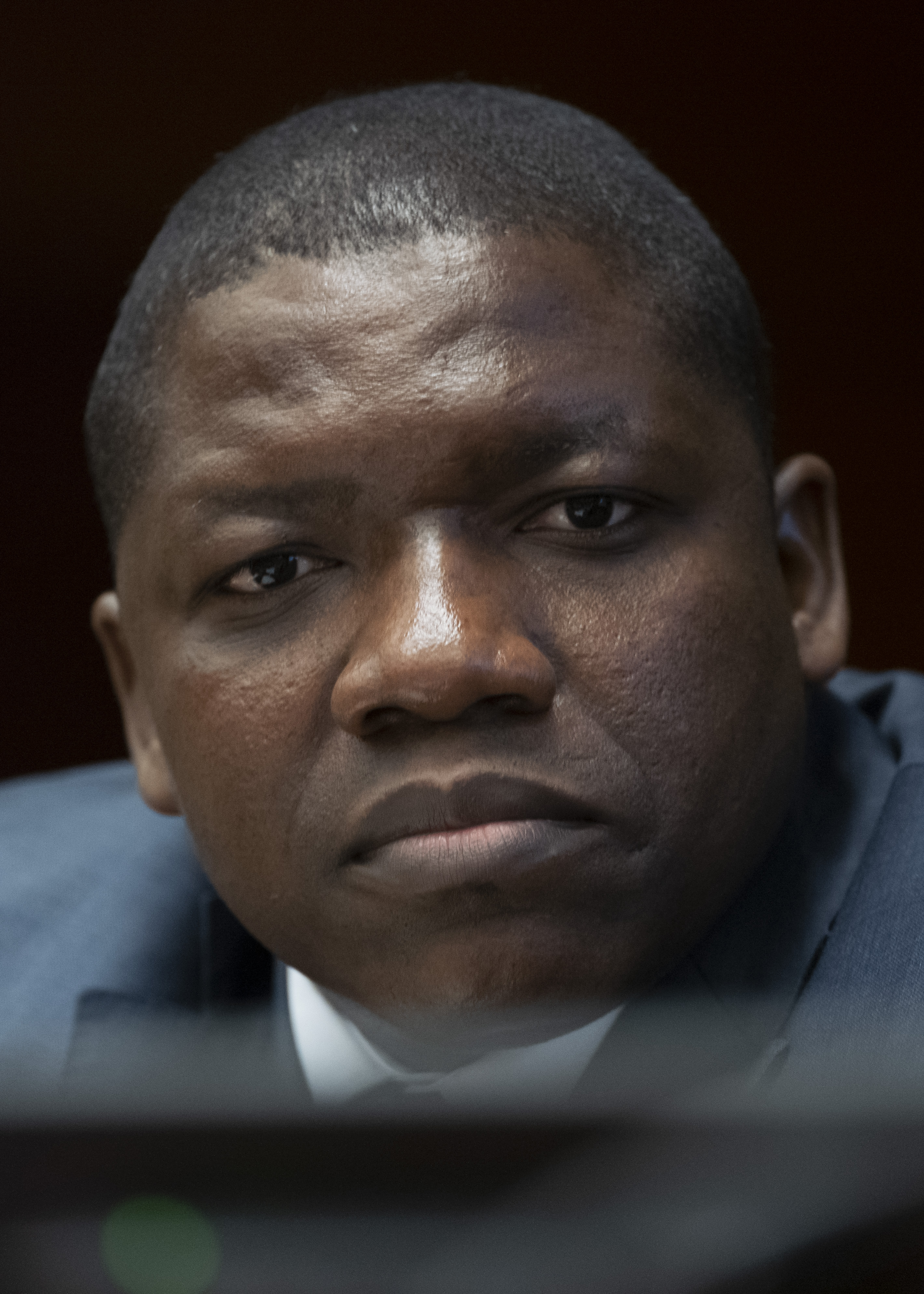
- Geoffrey Mwambe in 2018 at the World Investment Forum

Minister of State in the Prime Minister's Office
- In office 31 March 2021 – 8 January 2022 Serving with Jenista Mhagama
- President: Samia Suluhu
- Preceded by: Kitila Mkumbo
- Succeeded by: Ashatu Kijaji

18th Minister of Industry and Trade
- In office 5 December 2020 – 31 March 2021
- President: John Magufuli (2020); Samia Suluhu (2021)
- Preceded by: Innocent Bashungwa
- Succeeded by: Kitila Mkumbo

Member of Parliament
- Incumbent
- Assumed office December 2020
- Appointed by: John Magufuli
- Constituency: Masasi Urban

Personal details
- Born: 2 June 1975 (age 51) Ndanda, Masasi
- Party: CCM
- Spouse: Tumaini Kyando Mwambe
- Education: University of Dar es Salaam (BA Economics) (MA Economics)
- Profession: Economist

Geoffrey Mwambe is a Tanzanian CCM politician and a cabinet member. He is an elected MP for MASASI Urban in Mtwara region and was appointed by Tanzanian President John Magufuli in 2020 to serve as the Minister of Industry and Trade in December 2020. He was appointed as the head of the Tanzania Investment Center on 17 May 2017 before being elected a Member of Parliament for MASASI Urban and appointed in the cabinet after the 2020 Tanzanian general election. He continues to represent his people in MASASI Urban as their MP.

Geoffrey Idelphonce Mwambe is famously known for his open door policy, advocacy for private sector businesses and upholding ethical standards, innovation, creativity and public accountability.
