= Kitila Mkumbo =

Tanzanian politician

Honorable Kitila Mkumbo MP

Ministers of State in the President’s Office Investments and Planning
- Incumbent
- Assumed office 4 July 2022
- Preceded by: Established

19th Minister of Industry and Trade
- In office 1 April 2021 – 8 January 2022
- President: Samia Suluhu
- Preceded by: Geofrey Mwambe
- Succeeded by: Ashatu Kijaji

Member of Parliament for Ubungo Constituency
- Incumbent
- Assumed office November 2020
- Preceded by: Saed Kubenea

Ministers of State in the President’s Office
- In office 5 December 2020 – 31 March 2021
- Preceded by: Angellah Kairuki
- Succeeded by: Mohamed Mchengerwa

Personal details
- Born: 21 June 1971 (age 53); Singida Region, Tanzania
- Political party: Chama Cha Mapinduzi
- Education: Mgela Primary School (1981-1987), Mwenge Secondary School (1988-1991), Pugu Secondary School
- Profession: University of Dar es Salaam (BA) (MA); University of Southampton (PhD)

Kitila Alexander Kanyama Mkumbo is a Tanzanian politician and an academic professor.

== Career ==
He is a founder and director of Maarifa Research and Training Associates, a not-for-profit non-government institution that engages in provision of research, consultancy and training services in a wide range of areas in education and social sciences. As a director of this institute, he leads a team of seven researchers and consultants. He is also an adjunct professor at the Tumaini University Dar es Salaam College, where he is engaged in teaching and research on parttime basis.

=== Political career ===
In 2020, Mkumbo ran in the 2020 Tanzanian general election and won the Member of Parliament seat for Ubungo. Before that he had a brief stint in government as the Permanent Secretary of the Ministry of Water in the Tanzanian Union Government.

In Samia Suluhu Hassan inaugural cabinet, he was appointed as the Minister of Industry and Trade, however, was then replaced by Ashatu Kijaji in the first reshuffle. In July 2023, after a few changes in ministerial dockets, he rejoined the cabinet and was given the ministerial position of investments and planning in the presidents office.

== Education ==
He holds a PhD in psychology from the University of Southampton, UK; Master of Applied Social Psychology and BSc (education) from the University of Dar es Salaam, Tanzania. Kitila Mkumbo has published widely in peer-reviewed journal articles and made dozens of presentations at international academic conferences. He has supervised 31 postgraduate students, with 24 master-level candidates and 7 PhD candidates.
