= Damas Ndumbaro =

Tanzanian politician

Honorable Damas Daniel Ndumbaro MP

Minister of Culture, Arts and Sports
- Incumbent
- Assumed office 1 September 2023
- President: Samia Suluhu
- Preceded by: Pindi Chana

Minister of Constitutional Affairs and Justice
- In office 1 April 2022 – 31 August 2023
- President: Samia Suluhu
- Preceded by: George Simbachawene
- Succeeded by: Pindi Chana

Minister of Natural Resources and Tourism
- In office 5 December 2020 – 1 April 2022
- President: John Magufuli
- Preceded by: Hamisi Kigwangalla
- Succeeded by: Pindi Chana

Member of Parliament
- Incumbent
- Assumed office November 2017
- Preceded by: Leonidas Gama
- Constituency: Songea Urban 2020-present Nominated 2017-2020

Personal details
- Born: 14 June 1971 (age 55) Songea, Tanzania
- Party: Chama Cha Mapinduzi
- Education: UDSM, Open University of Tanzania

Damas Daniel Ndumbaro (born 14 June 1971) is a Tanzanian politician, lawyer and cabinet Minister of Culture, Arts and Sports.

He was a Minister of Natural Resources and Tourism and a politician who presently serves as a Chama Cha Mapinduzi's Member of Parliament for Songea Urban constituency for the second term since 2015. Also, he was the acting Chief Executive Officer of the Tanzania-Zambia Railway Authority since March 2013. He was an Advocate and a Lecturer of law at the Open University of Tanzania before joining politics and won a majority vote election in Songea Urban constituency under the ruling party CCM.

== Political career ==
In 2018, he was appointed by President John Magufuli, as the deputy minister of Foreign Affairs and East African Cooperation. In December 2020, after the 2020 general election, in Magufuli's 2nd cabinet, he was appointed the Minister of Natural Resources and Tourism. He continued in this docket following the death of Magufuli. However, in April 2022 he was made the new Minister of Constitutional Affairs and Justice in Samia Suluhu's cabinet. On 1 September 2023, following Samia Suluhu's cabinet reshuflle, he assumed a new post as Minister of Culture, Arts and Sports.
