= Mashimba Ndaki =

Tanzanian politician

Honorable Mashimba Ndaki MP

Minister of Livestock and Fisheries
- In office December 2020 – 26 February 2023
- President: Samia Suluhu
- Preceded by: Luhaga Mpina
- Succeeded by: Abdallah Ulega

Member of Parliament
- Incumbent
- Assumed office 29 October 2015
- President: John Magufuli
- Constituency: Maswa West

Personal details
- Born: 7 November 1962 (age 63) Maswa, Simiyu Region
- Citizenship: Tanzanian
- Party: Chama Cha Mapinduzi
- Education: Isanga Primary School, Buluba Secondary School, Songea Boys Secondary School
- Alma mater: University of Dar es Salaam (BA); Open University of Tanzania - Southern New Hampshire University (MA)

Mashimba Mashauri Ndaki is a Tanzanian CCM politician and was the Minister of Livestock and Fisheries between 2020 and 2023. He has served as Member of Parliament representing Maswa West in Simiyu Region since October 2015.
