= Charles Mwijage =

Tanzanian politician

Honourable Charles Mwijage MP
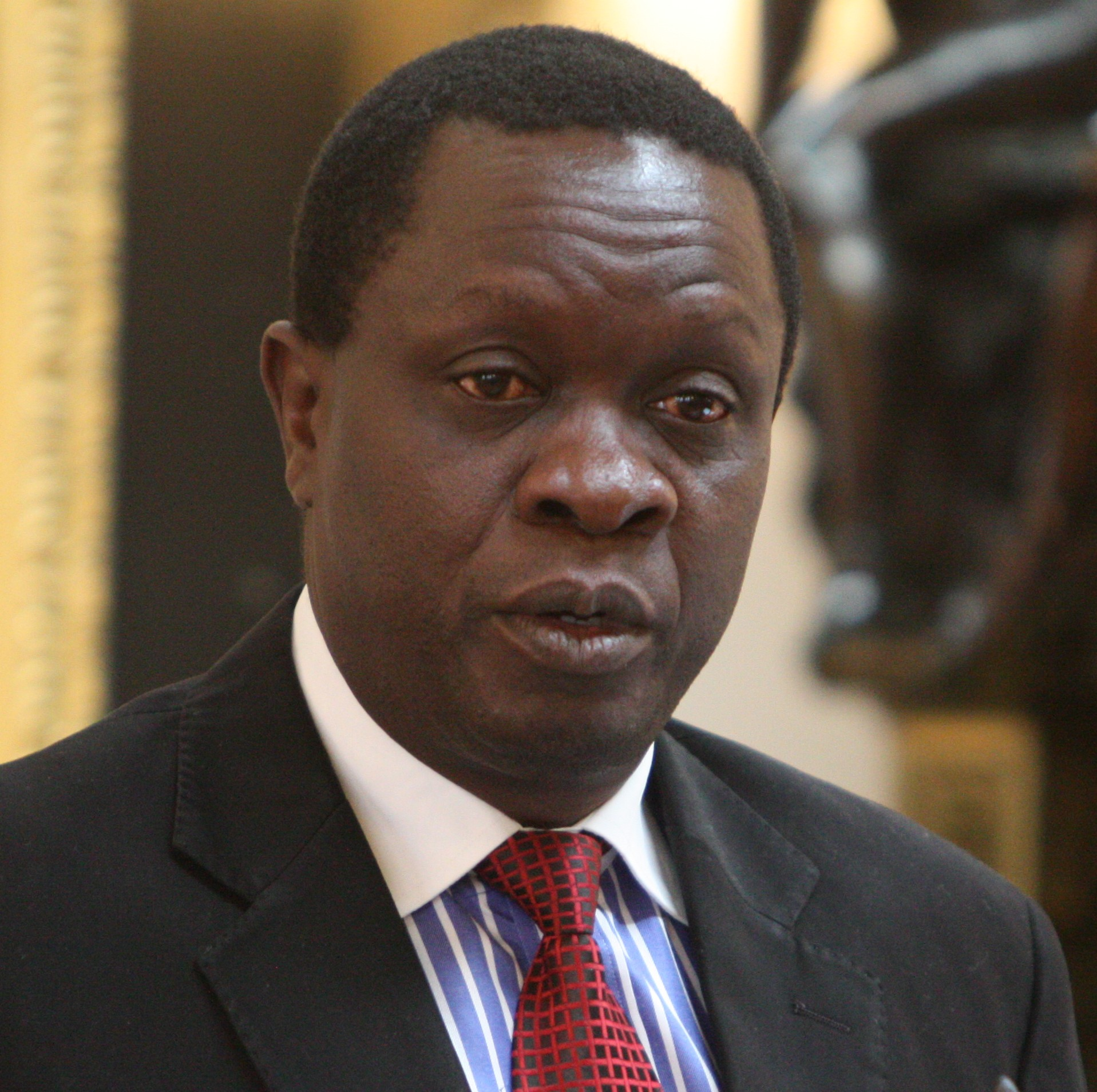

Minister of Industries, Trade and Investment
- In office January 2016 – 10 November 2018
- President: John Magufuli
- Preceded by: Abdallah Kigoda
- Succeeded by: Joseph Kakunda

Member of Parliament for Muleba North
- Incumbent
- Assumed office November 2010
- Preceded by: Ruth Msafiri

Personal details
- Born: 4 September 1960 (age 65)
- Party: CCM
- Website: Salford University (MBA)

Charles John Poul Mwijage is a Tanzanian CCM politician and Member of Parliament for Muleba North constituency since 2010. He served as the Minister of Industries, Trade and Investment in the Cabinet of Tanzania.

On November 10, 2018, he was dismissed by President John Magufuli on grounds of under-performance.
