= Medard Kalemani =

Tanzanian politician

Dr. Medard M. C. Kalemani
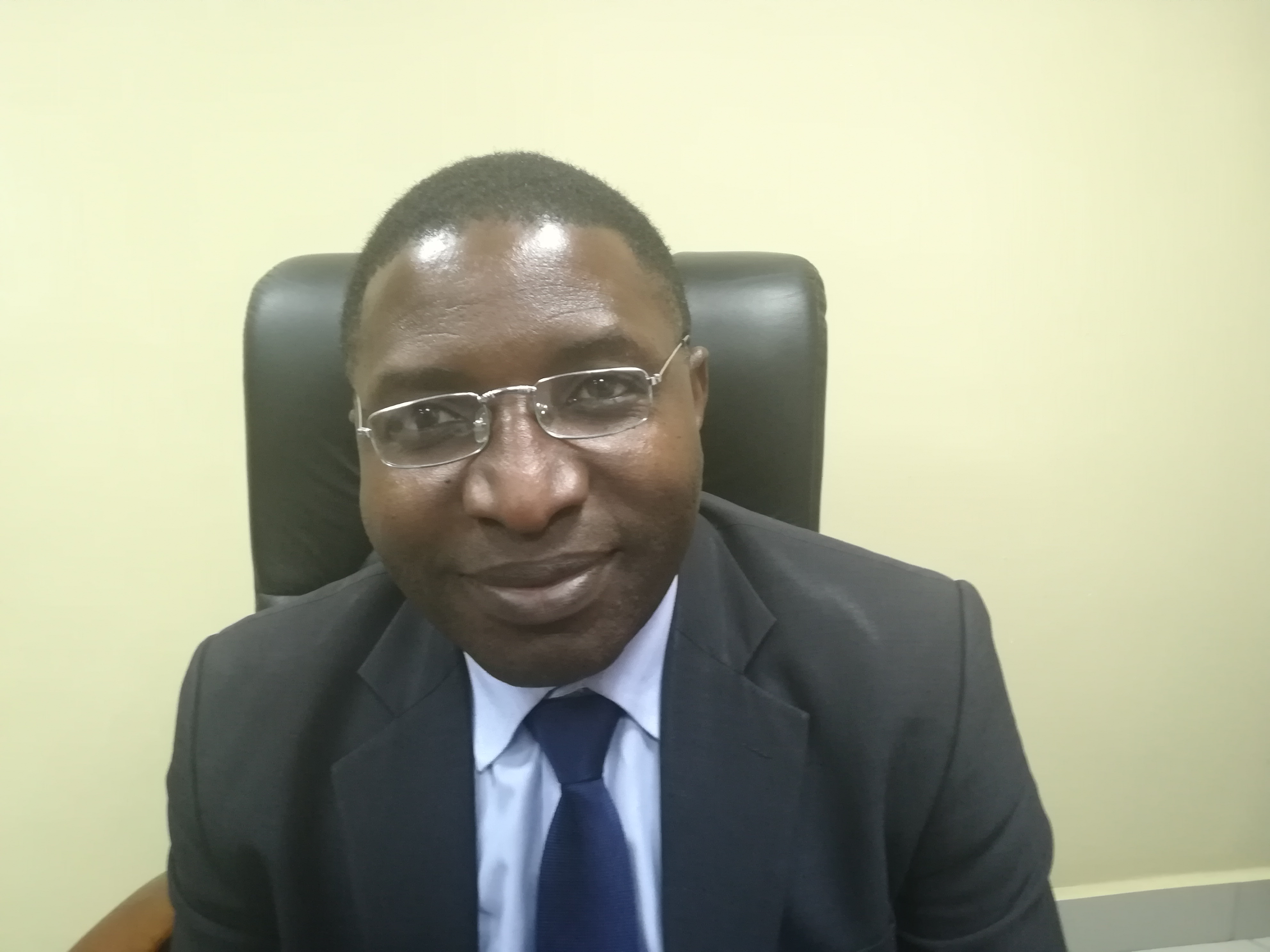

1st Minister of Energy
- In office 7 October 2017 – 11 September 2021
- President: John Pombe Joseph Magufuli
- Succeeded by: January Makamba

Member of Parliament Chato
- Incumbent
- Assumed office 2015
- Preceded by: John Magufuli
- Constituency: Chato

Personal details
- Born: 15 March 1968 (age 58)
- Party: Chama Cha Mapinduzi
- Education: University of Dar es Salaam (Bachelor of Laws); University of Dundee (Master of Laws); University of Bedford (Doctor of Philosophy)
- Profession: Lawyer
- Positions: Chief Legal Counsel of the Millennium Challenge Account-Tanzania (2007-2013)

Medard Matogolo Kalemani (born 15 March 1968), commonly known as Medard Kalemani, is a Tanzanian lawyer and politician, who served as the Minister of Energy in the Tanzanian cabinet, in 2017-2021. Immediately prior to his appointment to his current cabinet position, he served as Deputy Minister of the combined energy and minerals ministry, which was split into two, with Angellah Kairuki, assuming the mining docket.

== Background and education ==
He was born in Tanzania, on 15 March 1968. After studying in local primary and secondary schools, he entered the University of Dar es Salaam (UDSM), in 1993 to study law. He graduated from the UDSM with a Bachelor of Laws in 1996. He also holds a Master of Laws, awarded in 2002, by the University of Dundee, in Scotland. His Doctor of Philosophy was obtained from Bedford University, in the United Kingdom.

== Career ==
His first job was as a Legal Manager with the United Nations High Commissioner for Refugees/International Rescue Committee, working in that capacity from 1997 until 1998. In 1999, he relocated to the Ministry of Energy and Minerals, serving as a Senior Legal Officer until 2006. From 2007 until 2013, Kalemani served as the General Counsel of the Millenium Challenge Account in Tanzania. In 2013, he transferred back to the energy and minerals ministry, as the Director of the Legal Services Department, serving in that capacity until 2015.

In 2015, he was elected to the Tanzanian parliament to represent the Chato Constituency in the Geita Region of the country. In the same year, he was appointed Deputy Minister of Mining and energy, serving in that capacity until October 2017 when he was appointed Minister of Energy.

== See also ==
- Parliament of Tanzania
