= Joseph Kakunda =

Tanzanian politician

Honourable Joseph George Kakunda MP

Member of Parliament for Sikonge
- Incumbent
- Assumed office December 2015
- Preceded by: Said Juma Nkumba

Minister of Industry and Trade for Tanzania
- In office 10 November 2018 – 8 June 2019
- Preceded by: Charles Mwijage
- Succeeded by: Innocent Bashungwa

Personal details
- Party: Chama Cha Mapinduzi

Joseph George Kakunda is a Tanzanian politician and a member of the Chama Cha Mapinduzi political party. He is an incumbent Member of Parliament representing Sikonge Constituency in Tabora Region, since 2015, currently serving his second term (2020-2025). He was Minister of Industry and Trade from November 10, 2018 to June 8, 2019. This was after serving as Deputy Minister in the President's Office, Regional Administration and Local Government from October 10, 2017 to November 10, 2018. Before joining politics in 2015, He amassed vast experience in working as a Local Government Officer (1996-2000), excelling from Economist II to Principal Economist and Director of Water Program Coordination in the Central Government (2000-2015), and Community Development Coordinator for the UNDP (Mbola Millennium Village Project) in Tabora, Tanzania (2006-2007).
