= Ministry of Health, Community Development, Gender, Elders and Children (Tanzania) =

Government ministry of Tanzania

- Wizara ya Afya, Maendeleo ya Jamii, Jinsia, Wazee na Watoto.

Ministry overview
- Formed: 2015
- Preceding agencies: Ministry of Health and Social Welfare; Ministry of Community Development, Gender and Children
- Jurisdiction: Tanzania
- Headquarters: P.O. BOX 743, DODOMA
- Annual budget: Shillings 959.152 billion
- Minister responsible: Dorothy Gwajima
- Deputy Ministers responsible: Godwin Mollel; Mwanaidi Ali Khamis

The Ministry of Health, Community Development, Gender, Elders and Children is a government ministry of Tanzania. It deals with health policy, community development, gender and policy related to the elderly and children.

== History ==
The ministry was created as an amalgamation of the Ministry of Health and Social Welfare and the Ministry of Community Development, Gender and Children under John Magufuli's 2015 cabinet.
