= Leonard Chamuriho =

Tanzanian politician

Minister of Works and Transport
- In office 5 December 2020 – 11 September 2021
- President: John Magufuli
- Preceded by: Isack Aloyce Kamwelwe
- Succeeded by: Makame Mbarawa

Member of Parliament
- Incumbent
- Assumed office December 2020
- Appointed by: John Magufuli
- Constituency: None (Nominated MP)

Personal details
- Party: CCM
- Education: Dar es Salaam University (BSc); University of Illinois Urbana-Champaign(MSc); University of Tokyo(PhD)

Leonard Chamuriho is a Tanzanian CCM politician and a nominated cabinet member. He was nominated as an MP by Tanzanian President John Magufuli in 2020 to serve as the Minister of Works & Transport in December 2020.
