= Gerson Lwenge =

Tanzanian engineer and politician

Honourable Eng. Gerson Lwenge MP

9th Minister of Water and Irrigation
- In office 12 December 2015 – 7 October 2017
- President: John Magufuli
- Preceded by: Makame Mbarawa
- Succeeded by: Isack Aloyce Kamwelwe

Deputy Minister of Works
- In office 7 May 2012 – 5 November 2015
- Minister: John Magufuli

Deputy Minister of Water
- In office 28 November 2010 – 7 May 2012
- Minister: Mark Mwandosya

Member of Parliament for Njombe West
- Incumbent
- Assumed office November 2010
- Preceded by: Stanley Kevela

Personal details
- Born: 20 February 1951 (age 75) Tanganyika
- Party: CCM
- Education: University of Dar es Salaam
- Profession: Engineer

Gerson Hosea Malangalila Lwenge (born 20 February 1951) is a Tanzanian CCM politician and Member of Parliament for Njombe West constituency since 2010.
