= Sospeter Muhongo =

Tanzanian geologist and politician

Hon. Sospeter Muhongo MP
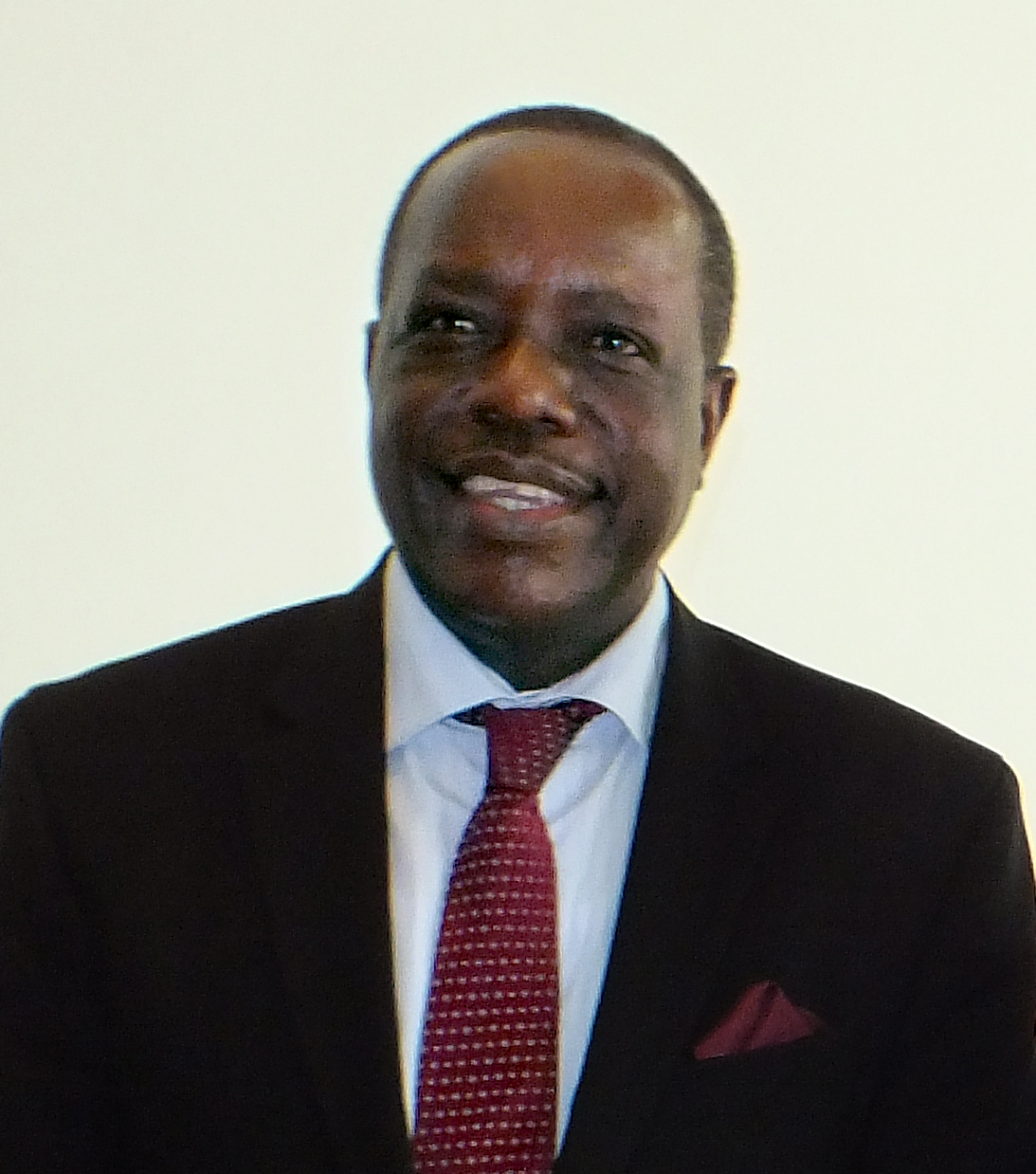

Minister of Energy and Minerals
- In office 12 December 2015 – 2017
- President: John Magufuli
- Preceded by: George Simbachawene
- In office 7 May 2012 – 24 January 2015
- President: Jakaya Kikwete
- Preceded by: William Ngeleja
- Succeeded by: George Simbachawene

Member of Parliament Musoma Rural
- Incumbent
- Assumed office November 2015
- Preceded by: Nimrod Mkono

Member of Parliament
- In office 12 June 2012 – July 2015
- Appointed by: Jakaya Kikwete
- Constituency: None (Nominated MP)

Personal details
- Born: 25 June 1954 (age 72) Musoma, Tanganyika
- Party: CCM
- Spouse: Bertha Mamuya
- Education: UDSM (BSc (Hons)); University of Göttingen (MSc); TU Berlin (Dr.rer.nat.)
- Profession: Geologist
- Committees: Chair, SPC^{1} of IYPE
- Positions: President, GSAf (1995–2001); Director, ICSU-Africa (2005–10)
- Awards: Robert Shackleton Award; Ordre des Palmes Académiques
- ^{1}Science Programme Committee

Sospeter Mwijarubi Muhongo MP (born 25 June 1954) is a Tanzanian geologist and a nominated member of the Tanzanian Parliament.

He served as the Minister of Energy and Minerals from May 2012 until his resignation in January 2015 following the Tegeta escrow scandal. He was succeeded by his deputy George Simbachawene. He won the parliamentary constituency of Musoma Rural in the general election and was thereafter appointed to his former portfolio by President John Magufuli.

== Life and career ==
He was the editor-in-chief of the Journal of African Earth Sciences.

He is a fellow of several highly learned professional societies including the Geological Society of London., the Geological Society of America, the Chinese Academy of Geological Sciences, and the Tanzania Academy of Sciences.

He also is the vice-president for Commission of the Geological Map of the World (CGMW), 2005-to date.

Has also worked as a Visiting Researcher, University of Mainz, Germany in 2000–2009

He was the founder and first executive director of the International Council for Science (ICSU)- Africa Region. ICSU is a non-governmental organisation with a global membership of national scientific bodies (121 members) and international scientific unions (30 members).

In 2009, he was among the nominated candidates from Tanzania, for the post of Director General for UNESCO.

== Honours and awards ==
=== Awards ===
- 1977: Vice-Chancellor's Prize, University of Dar es Salaam
- 1979: Gondwana Prize, University of Dar es Salaam
- 2004: Robert Shackleton Award for Outstanding Precambrian Research in Africa – the flagship award of the Geological Society of Africa.
- 2006: National Award for Research in Science and Technology (NARST) by the Tanzania Commission for Science and Technology
- 2007: The Honours Award of the Geological Society of South Africa.
- 2011: Ordre des Palmes Académiques (Order of Academic Palms) at Officier (Officer) grade by the French Government

=== Honorary ===
- University of Pretoria, Honorary Professor of Geology since 2006
- Honorary Research Fellow of the Chinese Academy of Geological Sciences (FCAGS)

== Publications ==
Muhongo is the author or co-author of over 150 scientific articles and technical papers and has co-authored the publication of large-scale geological maps of Africa, East Africa and Tanzania.

=== List of selected publications ===
- Muhongo, S., Gudyanga, F.P., Enow, A.A. and Nyanganyura, D. (Editors), (2009). Science, Technology and Innovation for Socio-Economic Development: Success Stories from Africa, 175 pp, Pretoria, South Africa (ISBN 978 0 620 45741 5)
- Fritz, H., Tenczer, V., Hauzenberger, C., Wallbrecher, E. and Muhongo, S., (2009). Hot granulite nappes – tectonic styles and thermal evolution of Proterozoic Granulite Belt in East Africa. Tectonophysics 477, Issue 3–4, 160–173.
- Muhongo, S., (2009). Managing the Future of Planet Earth: The role of knowledge, science, technology and innovation. In: Future of Planet Earth, Seminar Proceedings, Foundation For the Future (FFF)/UNESCO publication, p. 147–153.
- P. Pinna, S. Muhongo, et al. (2004) Geology and Mineral Map of Tanzania. Scale: 1:2.000.000 . (BRGM-UDSM-GST team)
