= Angellah Kairuki =

Tanzanian politician

Honourable Angellah Kairuki MP
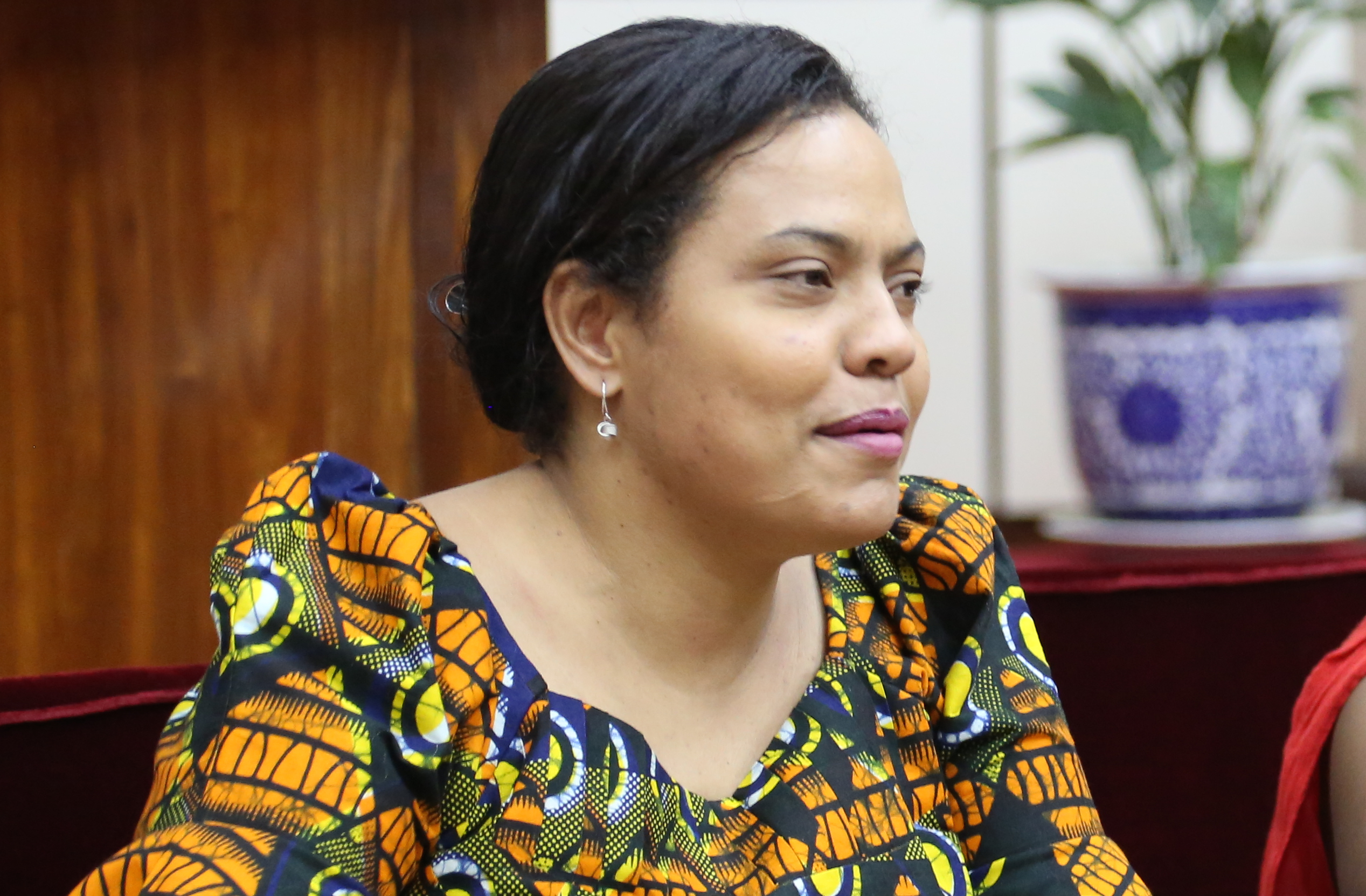

Minister of Communication & ICT
- Incumbent
- Assumed office 17 November 2025
- President: Samia Suluhu
- Preceded by: Jerry Silaa

Minister of Natural Resources & Tourism
- In office 1 September 2023 – 14 August 2024
- President: Samia Suluhu
- Preceded by: Mohamed Mchengerwa
- Succeeded by: Pindi Chana

Minister of State in the President's Office
- In office 2 October 2022 – 31 August 2023
- President: Samia Suluhu
- Preceded by: Innocent Bashungwa
- Succeeded by: Mohamed Mchengerwa
- In office 9 January 2019 – 16 June 2020
- President: John Magufuli
- Succeeded by: Kitila Mkumbo
- In office 12 December 2015 – 7 October 2017 Serving with George Simbachawene
- President: John Magufuli
- Succeeded by: Selemani Jafo

Minister of Mining
- In office 9 October 2017 – 9 January 2019
- President: John Magufuli
- Preceded by: Sospeter Muhongo
- Succeeded by: Doto Biteko

Member of Parliament
- Incumbent
- Assumed office November 2010
- Constituency: Appointed (Special Seat)

Personal details
- Born: 10 September 1976 (age 50) Mwanza Region, Tanzania
- Party: CCM
- Spouse: Mbelwa Kairuki
- Children: 3
- Education: University of Hull (LL.B); Staffordshire University (PgDL)
- Profession: Lawyer
- Website: www.angellahkairuki.com

Angellah Jasmine Mbelwa Kairuki (born 10 September 1976) is a Tanzanian CCM politician and cabinet Minister. On 1 September 2023, she began her post as the Minister of Natural Resources and Tourism of Tanzania.

In her last cabinet appointment she was the Minister of State in the President's Office. She previously served as Minister of Mining and the Deputy Minister for Lands, Housing and Human Settlement as well as Constitutional and Legal Affairs. Prior to joining politics, she worked as a lawyer in both public and private sectors.

== Background ==
Kairuki was born on September 10, 1976. She completed her schooling from the Zanaki Girls Secondary School in 1997. She received her Bachelor of Laws from the University of Hull in England in 2001. She went to finish a post-graduate diploma in Law from the Staffordshire University in collaboration with Central Law Training in 2002. She worked in the Attorney General's chambers as a legal secretary and lawyer between 2004 and 2008. Kairuki then moved to the private sector as Head of Department of the Ethics, Compliance and Governance at VODACOM Group PTY.

== Political career ==
Kairuki first took on a political role in 2007 when she became a member of the General Council of the women's wing of the ruling Chama Cha Mapinduzi (CCM) party and still continues in this role. Since 2010, she is a member of the party's National Executive Council.

In 2010, Kairuki became a Member of Parliament for CCM when she was appointed to a special seat reserved for women. She was the vice chairperson of the parliamentary Constitution, Legal affairs and Governance Committee between 2010 and 2012. Her first ministerial role was as a Deputy Minister in the Ministry of Justice and Constitution Affairs, which she served in between 2012 and 2015. In 2015, she was named the Deputy Minister of Land, Housing and Human Settlement Development. After the 2015 elections, the new President John Magufuli inducted Kairuki into the Cabinet as one of two Ministers in the President's Office responsible for Public Service Management and Good Governance.

In 2011, she was selected to represent Tanzania in the Inter-Parliamentary Union (IPU) and became a member of IPU's Human Rights Committee. She was cited as one of '20 Young Power African Women' in 2013 by Forbes magazine.

In 2015 she signed an open letter organized by the ONE Campaign, along with a number of prominent women. The letter was addressed to Chancellor of Germany Angela Merkel and the Chairperson of the African Union Nkosazana Dlamini-Zuma, urging them to focus on women, to set the priorities in development funding before a main UN summit in September 2015 that will establish new development goals for the generation.

On October 2, 2022, she was appointed as a minister in President's Office Region Administration and Local Government (PoRALG).
