= Isack Aloyce Kamwelwe =

Tanzanian politician

Isack Kamwelwe Aloyce

Minister of Works, Transport and Communication
- In office 1 July 2018 – 16 June 2020
- President: John Magufuli
- Preceded by: Makame Mbarawa
- Succeeded by: Leonard Chamuriho

9th Minister of Water and Irrigation
- In office 7 October 2017 – 1 July 2018
- President: John Magufuli
- Preceded by: Gerson Lwenge
- Succeeded by: Makame Mbarawa

Member of Parliament for Katavi
- In office 2015 – 16 June 2020
- President: John Magufuli

Personal details
- Born: April 30, 1956 (age 69)
- Party: CCM

Isack Aloyce Kamwelwe (born April 30, 1956) is a Tanzanian politician and a member of the Chama Cha Mapinduzi political party. He was elected MP representing Katavi in 2015. He is also the Minister of Transport in Tanzania.
