= Ministry of Natural Resources and Tourism =

Government ministry of Tanzania

- Wizara ya Maliasili na Utalii (Swahili)

Ministry overview
- Jurisdiction: Government of Tanzania
- Headquarters: Dodoma
- Minister responsible: Angellah Kairuki
- Deputy Minister responsible: Dunstan Kitandula
- Ministry executive: Hassan A. Said, Permanent Secretary
- Website: www.mnrt.go.tz

The Ministry of Natural Resources and Tourism (MNRT) is the government ministry of Tanzania that is responsible for the management of natural resources and cultural resources and for the development of the tourism industry. It has a wide range of investments in various tourist resources and tourism industry projects. Ministry offices are located in Dodoma. Damas Ndumbaro is the tourism minister of Tanzania.

The ministry's motto is "Tanzania Unforgettable".

== History ==
The MNRT has its origins in Tanzania's colonial-era conservation efforts. In 1959, the Tanganyika National Parks Ordinance (CAP 412) was enacted, laying the legal foundation for the establishment and management of national parks. This ordinance marked the beginning of formal conservation efforts in the country.

Following independence, the government expanded its focus on environmental and natural resource governance. The Wildlife Conservation Act of 1974 strengthened the framework for wildlife protection and sustainable use of biodiversity resources, helping establish wildlife reserves and management areas across the country.

Throughout the 1990s and early 2000s, the ministry underwent several institutional reforms aimed at unifying the management of tourism, forestry, wildlife, and cultural heritage under a single administrative structure. These reforms sought to improve efficiency, policy coordination, and service delivery within the sectors.

In April 2016, a major reorganization formalized the ministry's current structure under Government Notice No. 144. This restructuring emphasized integrated and participatory management of natural and cultural resources, positioning tourism as a key pillar of sustainable national development.

=== Organization ===
The work of the ministry is organized into four basic workgroups:

- Antiquities
  - Tanzanian Maritime Cultural Heritage Unit
- Tourism:
  - Tanzania National Parks Authority
- Wildlife Division* Est 1921:
  - Tanzania Wildlife Management Authority
  - Ngorongoro Conservation Area Authority
  - Tanzania National Parks Authority*
- Forestry and Beekeeping Division*
  - Tanzania Forest Agency

In addition, there are various support and administration divisions within the ministry.

=== Mission ===
To conserve natural, cultural resources sustainably and develop tourism for national prosperity and benefit of mankind through development of appropriate policies, strategies and guidelines; formulation and enforcement of laws and regulations; monitoring and evaluation of policies and laws.

=== Vision ===
Sustainable conservation of natural and cultural resources and development of responsible tourism.

== List of ministers ==
Minister	Term	Notes
Lazaro Nyalandu	January 2014 – November 2015	Introduced TAWA and promoted ivory-stockpile transparency.
Damas Ndumbaro	December 2020 – April 2022	Oversaw post-COVID tourism recovery and biodiversity initiatives.
Pindi Chana	March 2022 – February 2023	Promoted cultural and gender-inclusive tourism.
Mohamed Mchengerwa	February 2023 – September 2023	Focused on environmental governance during a brief tenure.
Angellah Kairuki	Since September 2023	Prioritized gender equity and youth engagement in tourism.

== See also ==
- Tourism in Tanzania
