= Ministry of Energy and Minerals =

- Wizara ya Nishati na Madini (Swahili)
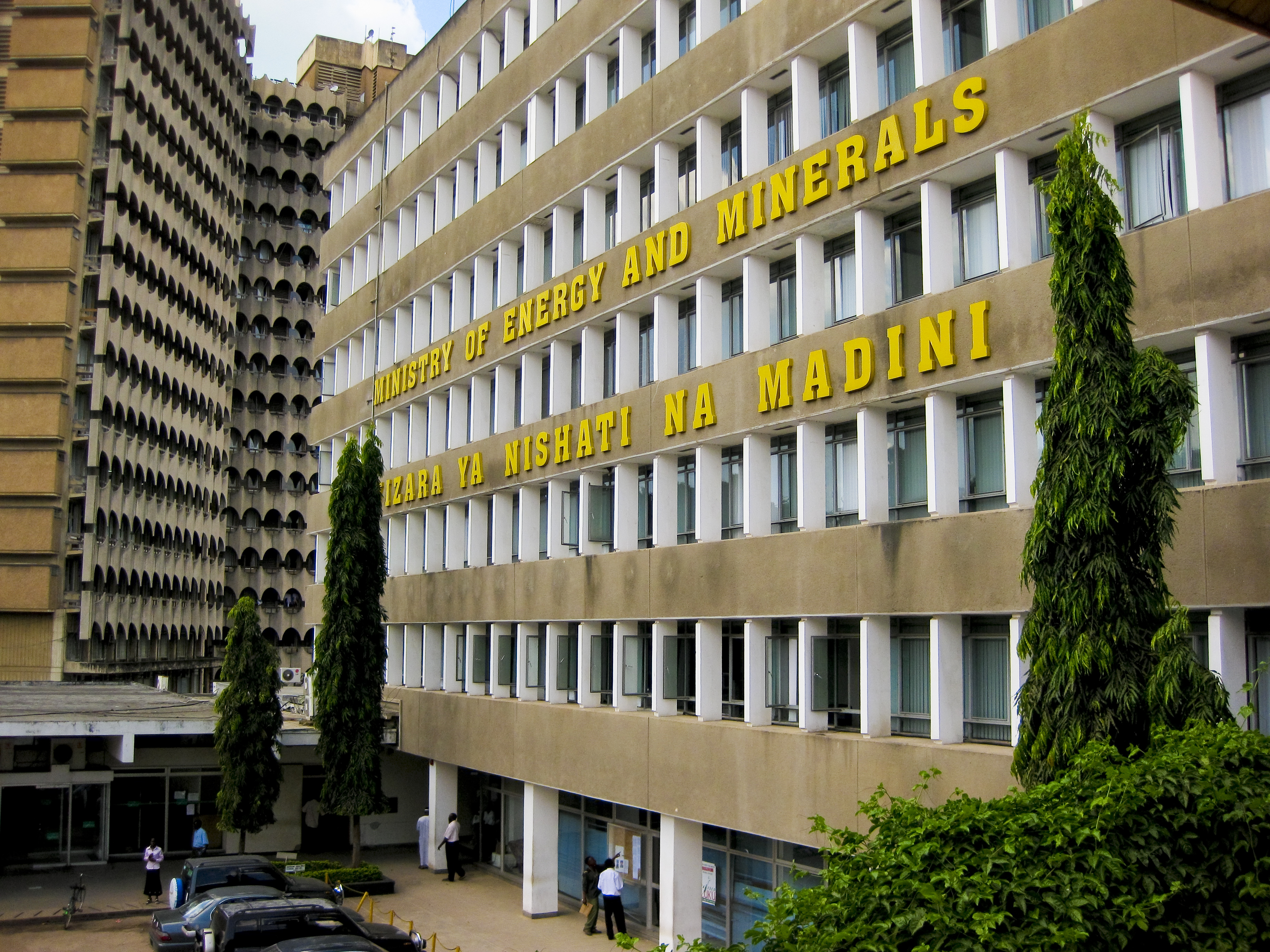

Ministry overview
- Superseding agencies: Ministry of Energy; Ministry of Minerals
- Jurisdiction: Government of Tanzania
- Headquarters: 5 Samora Avenue, Dar es Salaam; 6°48′55″S 39°17′31″E
- Ministry executive: Eliachim Maswi, Permanent Secretary
- Website: www.mem.go.tz

The Ministry of Energy and Minerals was the government ministry of Tanzania responsible for facilitating the development of the energy and mineral sectors.

The Ministry was ultimately split in 2017 by President John Magufuli to tighten supervision on the two industries.
