= Sumbwa language =

Bantu language of Tanzania

Sumbwa
- Kisumbwa
- Region: Tanzania
- Ethnicity: Sumbwa people
- Native speakers: 361,000 (2009)
- Language family: Niger–Congo?: Atlantic–Congo; Volta-Congo; Benue–Congo; Bantoid; Southern Bantoid; Bantu (Zone F.20); Northeast Bantu; Takama; Nyamwezic; Sumbwa

Language codes
- ISO 639-3: suw
- Glottolog: sumb1240
- Guthrie code: F.23

Sumbwa (or Sisumbwa/Lusumbwa; Swahili: Kisumbwa) is a Bantu language spoken in northwestern Tanzania.

The language is mainly spoken in Bukombe, Mbogwe and Geita districts (Geita Region); Kahama district (Shinyanga Region); Biharamulo district (Kagera Region) and Urambo district (Uyowa) – Tabora Region. Given the 2002 Census figures and population increases since then, the number of Sisumbwa speakers may be estimated as follows: Bukombe: 137,115; Kahama: 100,377; Geita: 79,490; Biharamulo: 4,306; Ilemela: 85; Kishapu: 110; Kwimba: 152; Misungwi: 103; Nzega: 358; Shinyanga (R): 2,260; Urambo: 36,755; This estimation gives 361,111 Sisumbwa speakers. These are the figures recorded in the Tanzania Language Atlas (2009:3), and this puts the language at no. 25 out of the 150 Tanzanian languages identified.

Sumbwa is still largely undescribed as there is an old grammar (Capus 1898), a trilingual dictionary (Kahigi 2008a) and description of some components of the morphology (Kahigi 2005; Kahigi 2008b).

== Sources ==
- Capus, A. 1898. Grammaire de Shisumbwa. In: Zeitschrift fϋr Africanische und Oceanische Sprachen, IV, Berlin, pp. 1-123.
- Guthrie, M. 1948. The Classification of Bantu Languages. London: International African Institute.
- Kahigi, K. K. 2005. The Sisumbwa Noun: Its Classes and Derivation. In: Occasional Papers in Linguistics, 1. LOT, Univ. of Dar es Salaam. Pp. 117-154.
- Kahigi, K. K. 2008a. Sumbwa-English-Swahili/ English-Sumbwa-Swahili Dictionary. published by Language of Tanzania Project (LOT), UDSM.
- Kahigi, K. K. 2008b. Derivation in Sisumbwa. In: Occasional Papers in Linguistics, 3. LOT, Univ. of Dar es Salaam, pp. 53-81.
- Masele, Balla 2001. The Linguistic History of Sisumbwa, Kisukuma and Kinyamweezi in Bantu Zone F. Ph.D. Dissertation. St. John: Memorial University of Newfoundland.
