= Chato District =

- District
- Chato District of Geita Region.
- Coordinates: 02°38′00″S 031°46′00″E
- Country: Tanzania
- Region: Geita
- District: Chato

Population (2022)
  - Total: 584,963
- Time zone: UTC+3 (EAT)
- Postcode: 30xxx
- Area code: 028
- Website: District Council website

Chato District is one of the five districts in Geita Region of northwestern Tanzania. Its administrative centre is the town of Chato. The main ethnic group in the district are the Sukuma. The late John Magufuli, who used to be as President of Tanzania from 2015—2021, was born in Chato.

== History ==
The Chato District was formed around 2005 within Kagera Region after being separated from Biharamulo District. In 2012, it was transferred to the newly created Geita Region.

In March 2006, Rwandan refugees who had settled in the district were evicted. The following year, a few who had been evicted improperly were allowed to come back.

== Transport ==
=== Airport ===
The district hosts the largest airport in the Region the Geita Airport, 14 kilometres (8.7 mi) south of Chato Town.

=== Road ===
The paved truck road T4 (from Mwanza to Bukoba) passes through southern part of the Chao district.

== Geography ==
=== Location ===
Chato District neighbours Lake Victoria to the northeast, Geita District to the east, the districts of Mbogwe and Bukombe to the south, and Biharamulo District of the Kagera Region to the west and north.

=== Climate ===
The annual rainfall in Chato District is adequate for crops, being between 700 and 1,000 millimetres (28 and 39 in) per year. The maximum temperature averages around 30.5 °C (86.9 °F) and the minimum temperatures around 26.6 °C (79.9 °F).

Climate data for Chato District
Month	Jan	Feb	Mar	Apr	May	Jun	Jul	Aug	Sep	Oct	Nov	Dec	Year

== Administration Division ==
=== Wards ===
The Chato District is divided into 23 wards:

- Bukome
- Buseresere
- Butengorumasa
- Buziku
- Bwanga
- Bwera
- Bwina
- Bwongera
- Chato
- Minkoto
- Ichwankima
- Ilemela
- Ilyamchele
- Iparamasa
- Kachwamba
- Kasenga
- Katende
- Kigongo
- Makurugusi
- Muganza
- Muungano
- Nyamirembe
- Nyarutembo

== Economy ==
The primary economic activity is subsistence farming without irrigation, using only rain.

=== Food Crops ===
Common crops for local consumption are bananas, beans, maize, cassavas, and sweet potatoes.

=== Cash Crops ===
Commercial farming is not well developed, but cotton, sunflower, tobacco and coffee are grown for sale.

=== Livestock ===
Livestock rearing is usually an adjunct to farming, with some commercial ranches.

== Tourism ==
Rubondo Island National Park is located on an island in Lake Victoria just off the coast of Chato District. It can be reached by ferry from Kasenda, a village in the north of the district.
