= Kharumwa =

Kharumwa Karumwa
- town
- Location in Tanzania
- Coordinates: 03°12′00″S 032°39′00″E
- Country: Tanzania
- Region: Geita
- District: Nyang'hwale
- Time zone: UTC+3 (GMT)
- UFI: -2564414
- Climate: Aw

Kharumwa (Karumwa) is a town in Geita Region of northwestern Tanzania, East Africa. It is the administrative centre for Nyang'hwale District.

== History ==
Prior to 2012, Kharumwa was part of Geita District, Mwanza Region.
