= Ushirombo =

- Town
- Location in Tanzania
- Coordinates: 03°28′15″S 31°54′00″E
- Country: Tanzania
- Region: Geita
- District: Bukombe

Government
  - Type: Town Council
- Time zone: GMT + 3
- Climate: Aw

Ushirombo is a town in the Geita Region in northwestern Tanzania. The town is the location of the district headquarters for Bukombe District. In 2016, its population was 95,052.
