= Nyang'hwale District =

- District
- Nyang'hwale District of Geita Region.
- Coordinates: 03°12′S 032°39′E
- Country: Tanzania
- Region: Geita Region

Area
  - Total: 1,606 km^{2} (620 sq mi)

Population (2022 census)
  - Total: 225,803
  - Density: 140.6/km^{2} (364.2/sq mi)

Nyang'hwale District is one of the five districts of Geita Region of Tanzania. Its administrative centre is the village Kharumwa. It is bordered to the north by Sengerema District, to the east by Misungwi District and Shinyanga Rural District, to the south by Kahama Rural District, and to the west by Geita District.

As of 2022, the population of Nyang'hwale was 225,803. Nyang'hwale was established in 2012, when it was split off from Geita District and became part of the newly established Geita Region.

== Transport ==
Nyang'hwale district is not connected by any paved or trunk roads. Two unpaved regional roads (R162 and R163) connect the district with Geita town, Kahama town and Sengerema District.

== Administrative subdivisions ==
=== Wards ===
As of 2022, Nyang'hwale District was administratively divided into 15 wards:

- Bukwimba
- Busolwa
- Izunya
- Kafita
- Kakora
- Kharumwa
- Mwingiro
- Nyabulanda
- Nyang'hwale
- Nyijundu
- Nyugwa
- Shabaka
- Nyamtukuza
- Nundu
- Kaboha
