= Mwanza =

Capital city of Mwanza Region, Tanzania

Mwanza City Rock City
- City of Mwanza Region
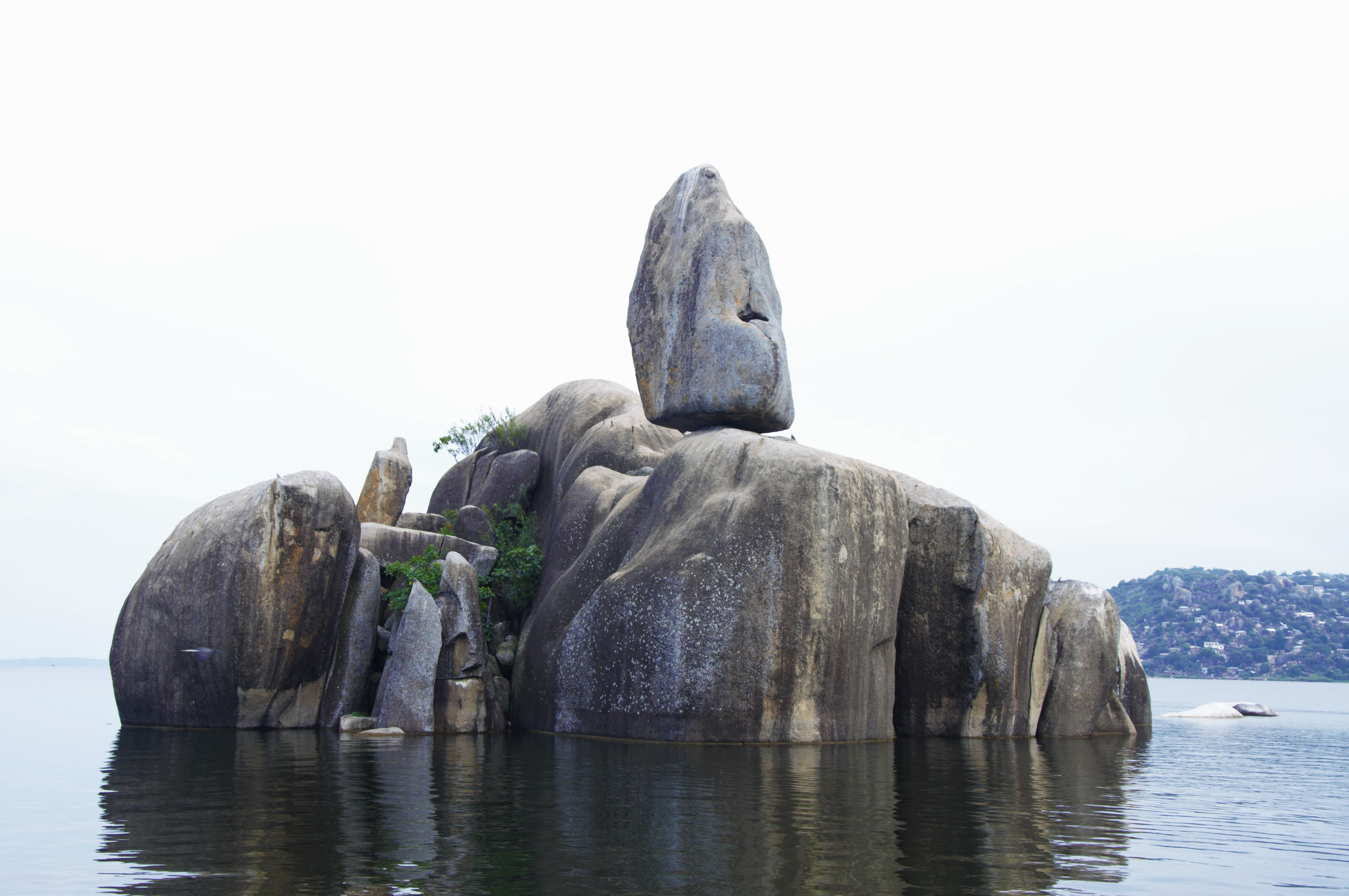
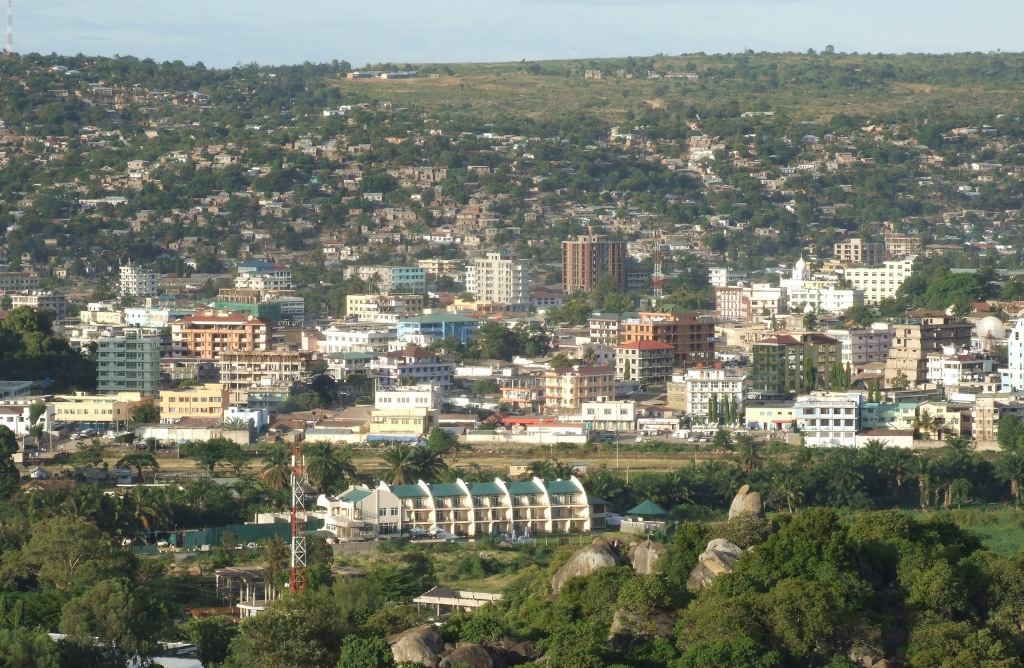
- From top: Bismarck Rock, Mwanza city from Capri Point

- Flag

- Location of Mwanza
- Coordinates: 2°31′S 32°54′E
- Country: Tanzania
- Admin. division: Mwanza Region
- First Settled: 1892
- Incorporated Town: 1978
- Incorporated City: 2000
- Districts: List: Nyamagana; Ilemela

Government
  - Type: City Council
  - Lord Mayor: Mr. James Bwire
  - City Director: Mr. Kiomoni Kiburwa Kibamba
- Elevation: 1,140 m (3,740 ft)

Population (2022 census)
  - Urban: 1,104,521
- Time zone: GMT + 3
- Area code: 028
- Climate: Aw

Mwanza City, also known as Rock City to the residents, is a port city and capital of Mwanza Region on the southern shore of Lake Victoria in north-western Tanzania. With an urban population of 1,104,521 and a population of 3,699,872 in the region (2022 census), it is Tanzania's second largest city, after Dar es Salaam. It is also the second largest city in the Lake Victoria basin after Kampala, Uganda and ahead of Kisumu, Kenya at least in population size. Within the East African community, Mwanza city is the fifth largest city after Dar es Salaam, Nairobi, Mombasa, and Kampala. It is slightly ahead of Kigali, Kisumu, and Bujumbura in the population of city proper limits. Mwanza city is also the capital city of Mwanza Region, and is administratively divided into two municipal districts within that Region - Ilemela and Nyamagana.

== Demographics ==
The Sukuma constitute over 90 percent of the population of the Mwanza Region. Other ethnic groups in the region, in much smaller proportions, include the Zinza, Haya, Sumbwa, Nyamwezi, Luo, Kurya, Jita, Shashi and Kerewe. They live mainly in the Mwanza city area. National policy, however, gives very little importance to ethnic groupings and reliable data is difficult to find.

Historical population
Year	Pop.	±%
1978	110,553	—
1988	172,287	+55.8%
2002	385,810	+123.9%
2012	706,453	+83.1%
2022	1,104,521	+56.3%

== Economy ==
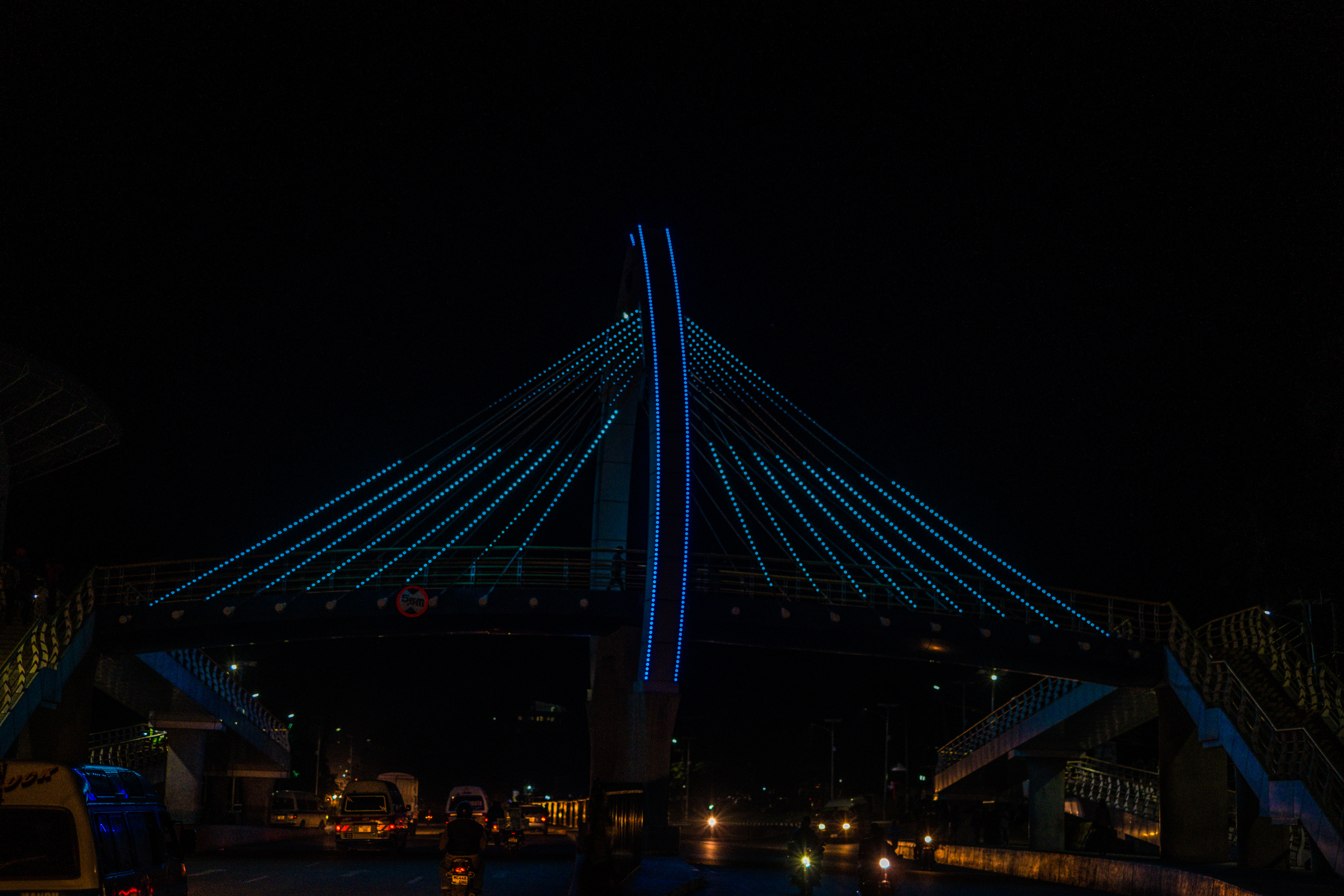
The bridge of Furahisha in Mwanza represents transportation and safety of its people. This has a created safe space for the citizens and it stand as a remarkable symbol of Mwanza.

In 2011 the City Council announced plans to create a major commercial development in the Ilemela District. Construction works on Rock City Mall were finalized in early 2016. This mall is the first of its size in Mwanza and one of the biggest malls in the country.

Tanzania Breweries Limited has a brewery in Mwanza.

=== Fishing ===
One major occupation of the inhabitants along the shores of Lake Victoria in Mwanza region is fishing, and there are five fish processing plants in the area. The Nile perch were previously introduced to the lake, and are exported in large quantities.

The consequences of the Nile perch industry are the subject of the Academy Award nominated documentary Darwin's Nightmare (2004) by Hubert Sauper.

=== Water supply and sanitation ===
Water supply coverage is at 75% and sewerage at 23.7%. Projects to increase coverage including the UN Habitat Lake Victoria Water and Sanitation (LVWATSAN-Mwanza) project.

Water is managed by the Mwanza Urban Water Supply and Sanitation Authority (Mwauwasa), established in 1996 and wholly owned by the government of Tanzania. The authority covers Mwanza City, Kisesa Township in Magu District, Misungwi town and Nyahiti Village in Misungwi District, Geita, Sengerema and Nansio, and Lamadi in Simiyu Region. Mwauwasa operates a wastewater treatment plant in Butuja Ilemela.

== Tourism ==
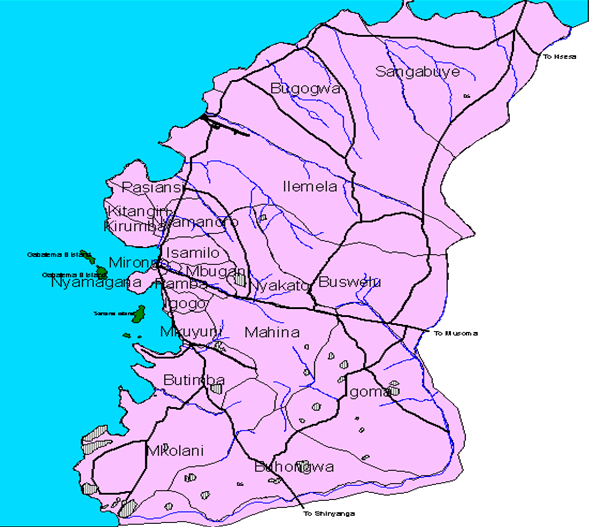
The Mwanza city map

=== National parks ===
Saanane Island National Park is located on a rocky island in Lake Victoria, 500 metres (1,600 ft; 550 yd) from Capri Point in the centre of Mwanza.

The westernmost gate (Ndabaka Gate) of Serengeti National Park is located at around 150 kilometres (93 miles) by road from Mwanza town. Day trips to Serengeti National Park are organised by several tour operators in Mwanza.

Rubondo Island National Park can be reached by road and boat, or by a direct flight from Mwanza. It is located around 110 kilometres (68 miles) west of Mwanza town.

=== Culture ===
The Sukuma Museum is located in Bujora, just east of Mwanza near Kisesa. It gives an overview of the history, architecture, culture and language of the Sukuma tribe, from which the majority of the native population originates.

== Education ==
St. Augustine University of Tanzania (SAUT) is the main university in Mwanza. The University extends over 600 acres (243 ha) in the Nyegezi-Malimbe area 10 km south of Mwanza City. It lies 4 km off the main Mwanza- Shinyanga road on the south eastern shores of Lake Victoria. The University is a half-hour's drive from Mwanza by car or by bus.

== Places of worship ==
Among the places of worship, they are predominantly Christian churches and temples : Africa Inland Church Tanzania, Roman Catholic Archdiocese of Mwanza (Catholic Church), Anglican Church of Tanzania (Anglican Communion), Evangelical Lutheran Church in Tanzania (Lutheran World Federation), Baptist Convention of Tanzania (Baptist World Alliance), Assemblies of God. There are also Muslim mosques. In the Temple Street, close to each other there are a large Hindu Temple built in the late 50's, one of the first such temples in Tanzania, a Vaishnava Sanatana Mandir, and a BAPS (Swaminarayan) temple - all of them serving the Hindu community.

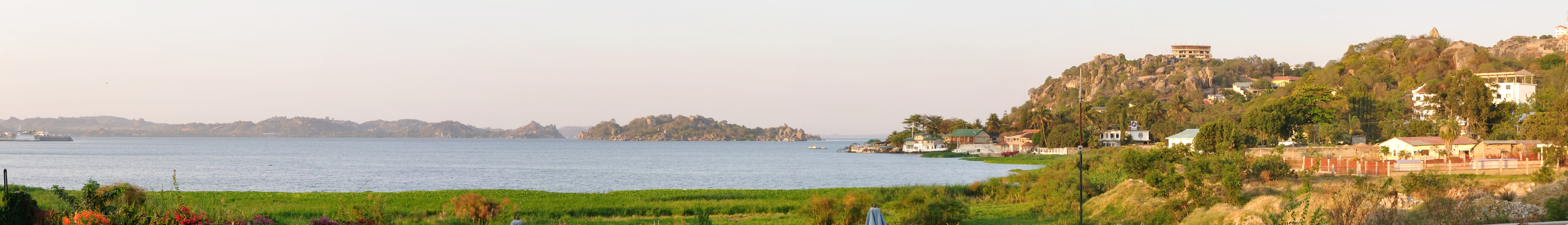
View of Lake Victoria and Mwanza

== Climate ==
Mwanza features a tropical savanna climate under the Köppen climate classification. Temperatures are relatively consistent throughout the course of the year, tempered by the city's altitude. Thus, the climate is not quite as hot as one might expect, given the city's location near the equator. Average temperatures in Mwanza are roughly 23.5 °C (74.3 °F) throughout the year. The city features a lengthy wet season which runs from October through May and a short pronounced dry season that covers the remaining four months. Mwanza receives on average roughly 1,050 millimetres (41 in) of precipitation annually.

Climate data for Mwanza (1991-2020)
Month	Jan	Feb	Mar	Apr	May	Jun	Jul	Aug	Sep	Oct	Nov	Dec	Year
Record high °C (°F)	35.0 (95.0)	35.0 (95.0)	36.6 (97.9)	34.0 (93.2)	35.6 (96.1)	35.0 (95.0)	34.0 (93.2)	34.2 (93.6)	34.5 (94.1)	36.0 (96.8)	35.6 (96.1)	34.2 (93.6)	36.6 (97.9)
Mean daily maximum °C (°F)	27.8 (82.0)	28.8 (83.8)	28.7 (83.7)	28.5 (83.3)	28.5 (83.3)	28.9 (84.0)	28.9 (84.0)	29.1 (84.4)	29.3 (84.7)	28.9 (84.0)	27.9 (82.2)	27.5 (81.5)	28.6 (83.5)
Daily mean °C (°F)	22.8 (73.0)	23.3 (73.9)	23.2 (73.8)	23.1 (73.6)	23.2 (73.8)	22.7 (72.9)	22.2 (72.0)	22.6 (72.7)	23.4 (74.1)	23.4 (74.1)	22.9 (73.2)	22.8 (73.0)	23.0 (73.3)
Mean daily minimum °C (°F)	18.1 (64.6)	18.0 (64.4)	18.2 (64.8)	18.4 (65.1)	18.1 (64.6)	16.5 (61.7)	15.6 (60.1)	16.7 (62.1)	17.7 (63.9)	18.3 (64.9)	18.4 (65.1)	18.3 (64.9)	17.7 (63.9)
Record low °C (°F)	10.8 (51.4)	11.0 (51.8)	14.0 (57.2)	14.0 (57.2)	13.0 (55.4)	12.0 (53.6)	11.0 (51.8)	11.0 (51.8)	13.0 (55.4)	13.0 (55.4)	10.8 (51.4)	12.0 (53.6)	10.8 (51.4)
Average precipitation mm (inches)	113.7 (4.48)	82.0 (3.23)	154.5 (6.08)	173.0 (6.81)	70.3 (2.77)	25.7 (1.01)	5.0 (0.20)	23.7 (0.93)	42.3 (1.67)	120.6 (4.75)	158.3 (6.23)	146.0 (5.75)	1,115.1 (43.91)
Average precipitation days (≥ 1.0 mm)	9.9	6.7	10.7	13.0	7.3	1.9	0.5	2.3	4.0	8.8	13.4	11.9	90.4
Average relative humidity (%)	71	71	69	74	70	66	58	58	59	61	71	73	67
Mean monthly sunshine hours	229.4	211.9	235.6	231.0	254.2	282.0	285.2	266.6	252.0	241.8	210.0	223.2	2,922.9
Mean daily sunshine hours	7.4	7.5	7.6	7.7	8.2	9.4	9.2	8.6	8.4	7.8	7.0	7.2	8.0
Source 1: NOAA
Source 2: Deutscher Wetterdienst (extremes, humidity, and sun), Tokyo Climate Center (mean temperatures 1991–2020)

== Transport ==
=== Airport ===
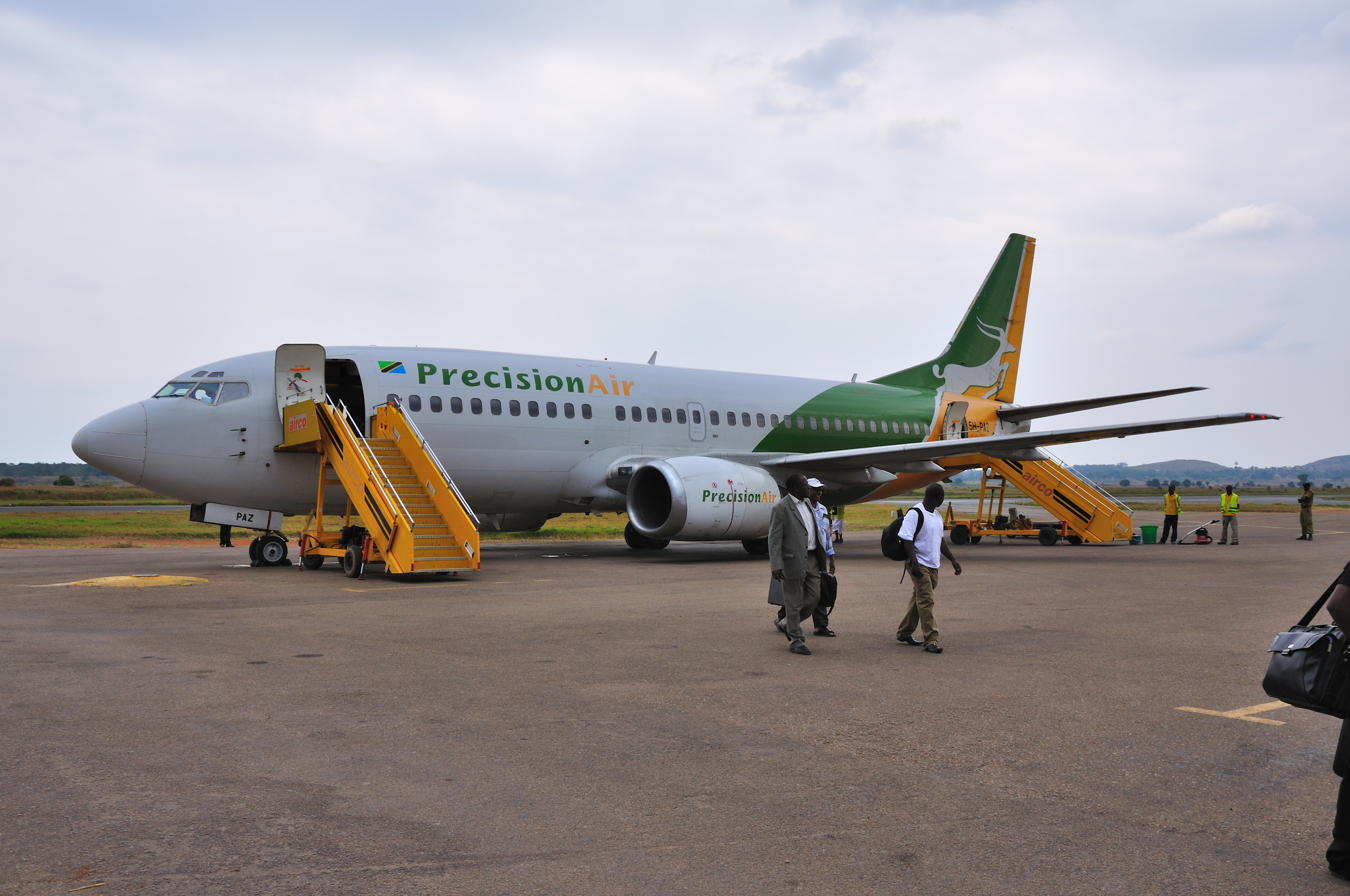
Aircraft at Mwanza Airport.

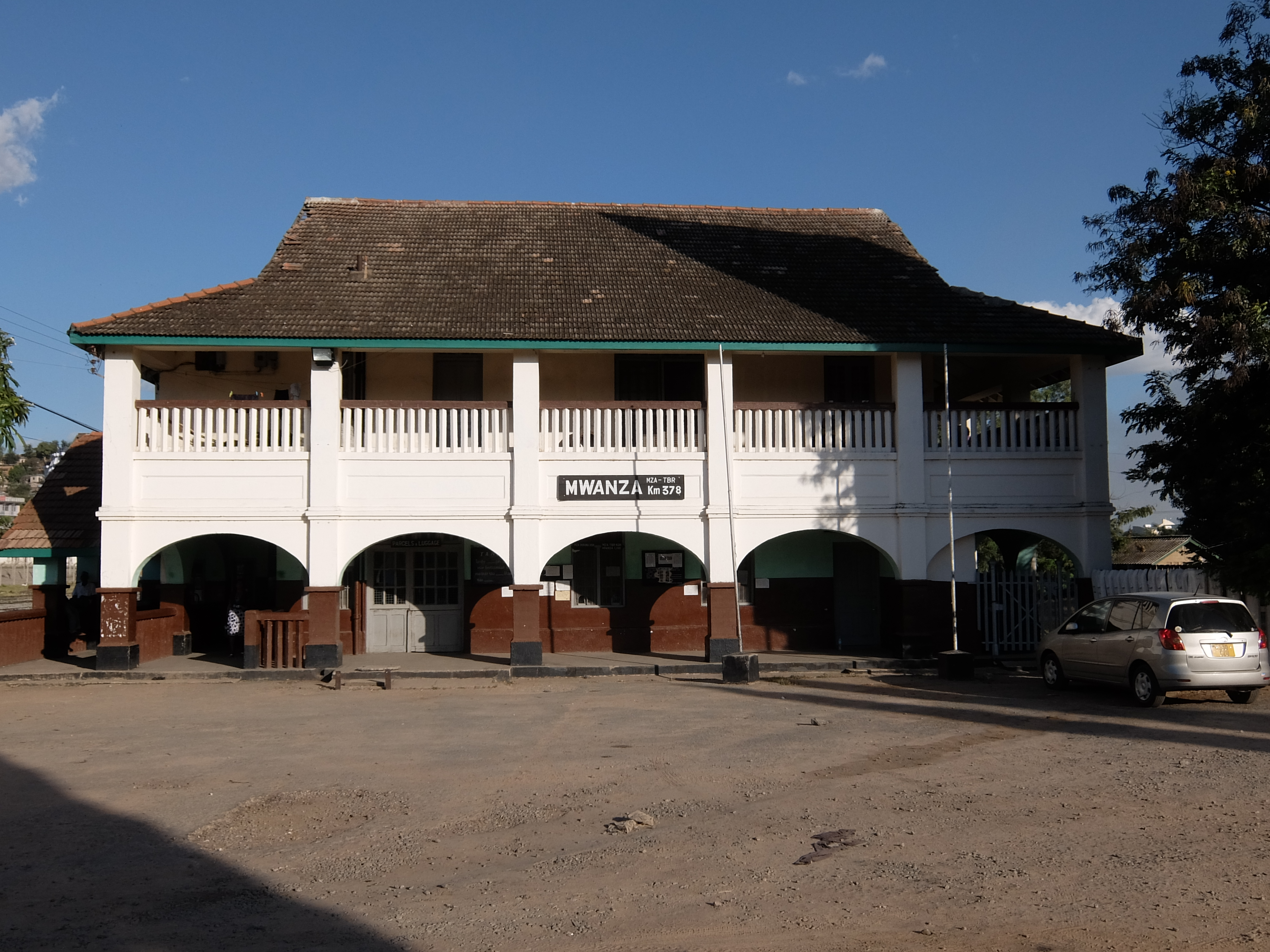
The Mwanza Railway Station.

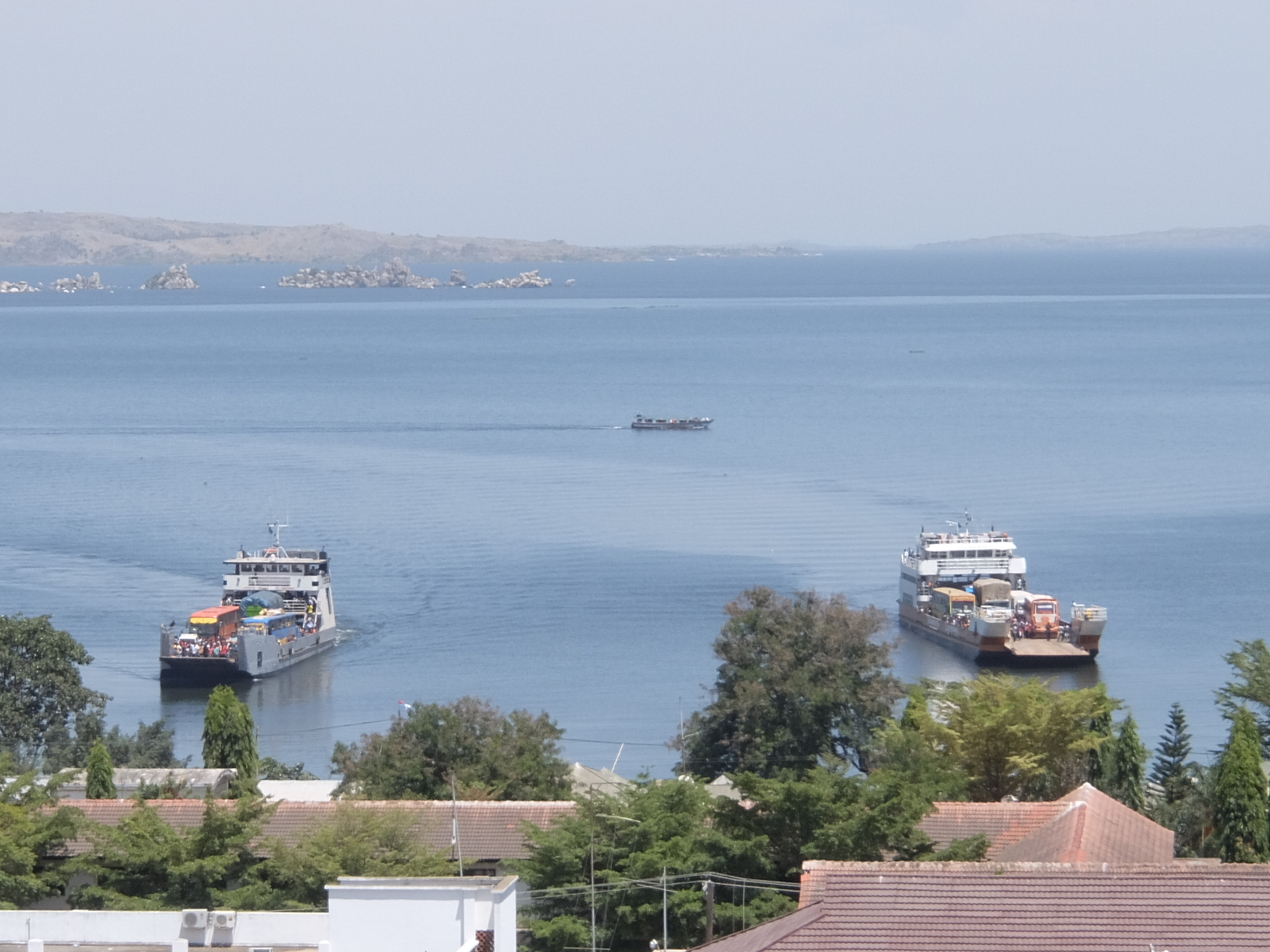
Two ferries from Kamanga arriving at the port of Mwanza.

Mwanza is served by the Mwanza Airport, which is designated as a regional airport.

Air Tanzania offers flights to Dar es Salaam. Precision Air has daily flights to Mwanza, including from Nairobi (via Kilimanjaro), and Air Tanzania also flies to the city.

=== Railway ===
The city is connected by rail with Shinyanga on a branch of Tanzania's Central Railway. Twice a week the train departs to Dar es Salaam, via Dodoma, Tabora and Kigoma.

=== Buses ===
Nyegezi bus station is located in Nyamagana district. Buses going to the south and west leave from Nyegezi, as well as international services.

Buzuruga bus station is located in Ilemela district. Buses going to the east, North and the Kenyan border depart from Buzuruga bus station.

=== Ferry ===
In December 2014 the regular ferry service between Mwanza, Bukoba and Kampala was halted whilst the ferry boat MV Victoria underwent major maintenance.

== Sports ==
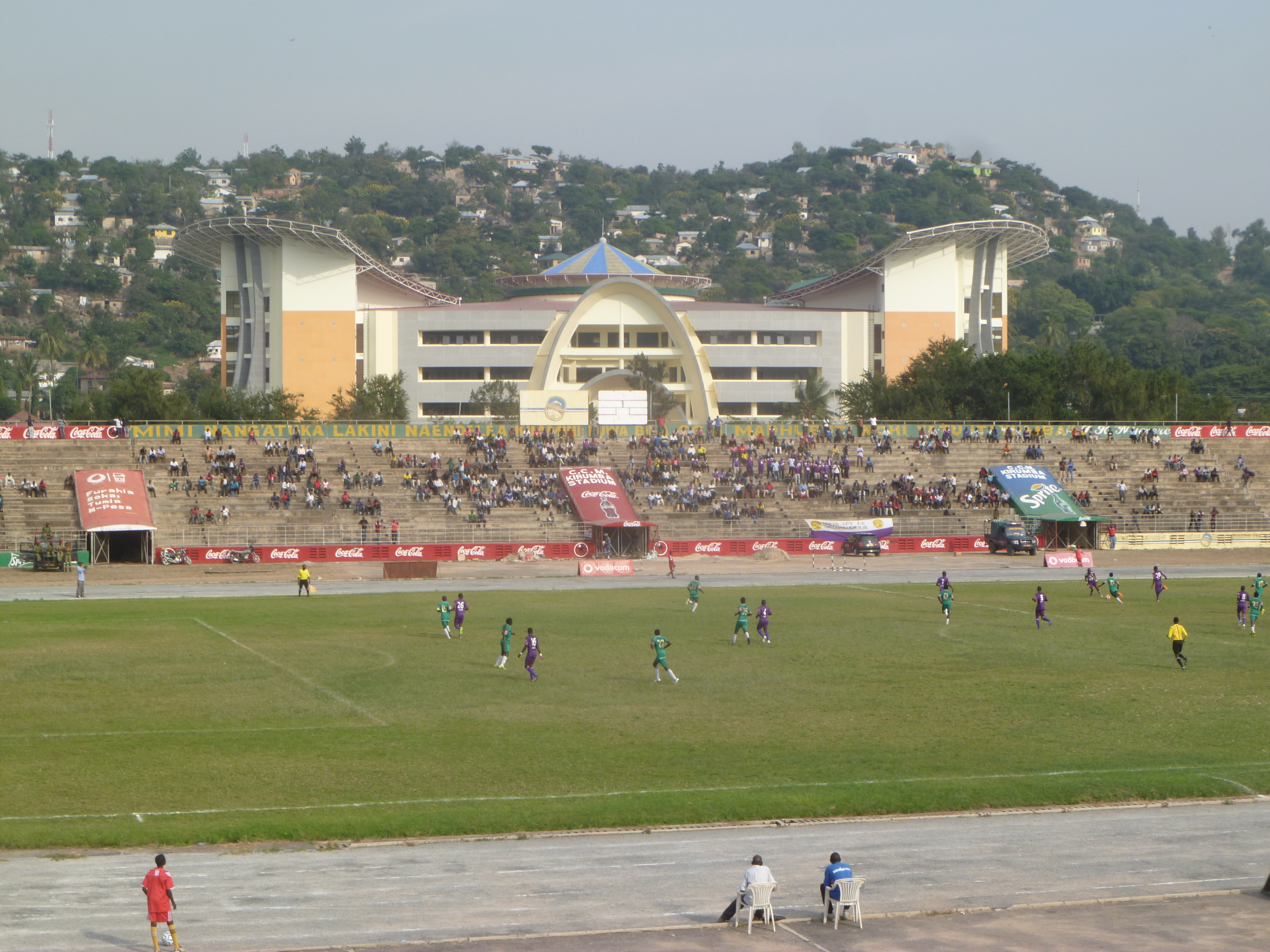
The CCM Kirumba Stadium.

The CCM Kirumba Stadium has hosted matches of the Tanzania national football team.

Mbao FC is a football team from Mwanza that was promoted to the Tanzanian Premier League at the end of the 2015/2016 football season.

== Sister cities ==
- Tampere, Finland: The relationship between Tampere and Mwanza is part of the North-South Local Government Co-operation Programme.
- (Western Sahara) Tifariti, Sahrawi Arab Democratic Republic
- Würzburg, Germany

== Gallery ==
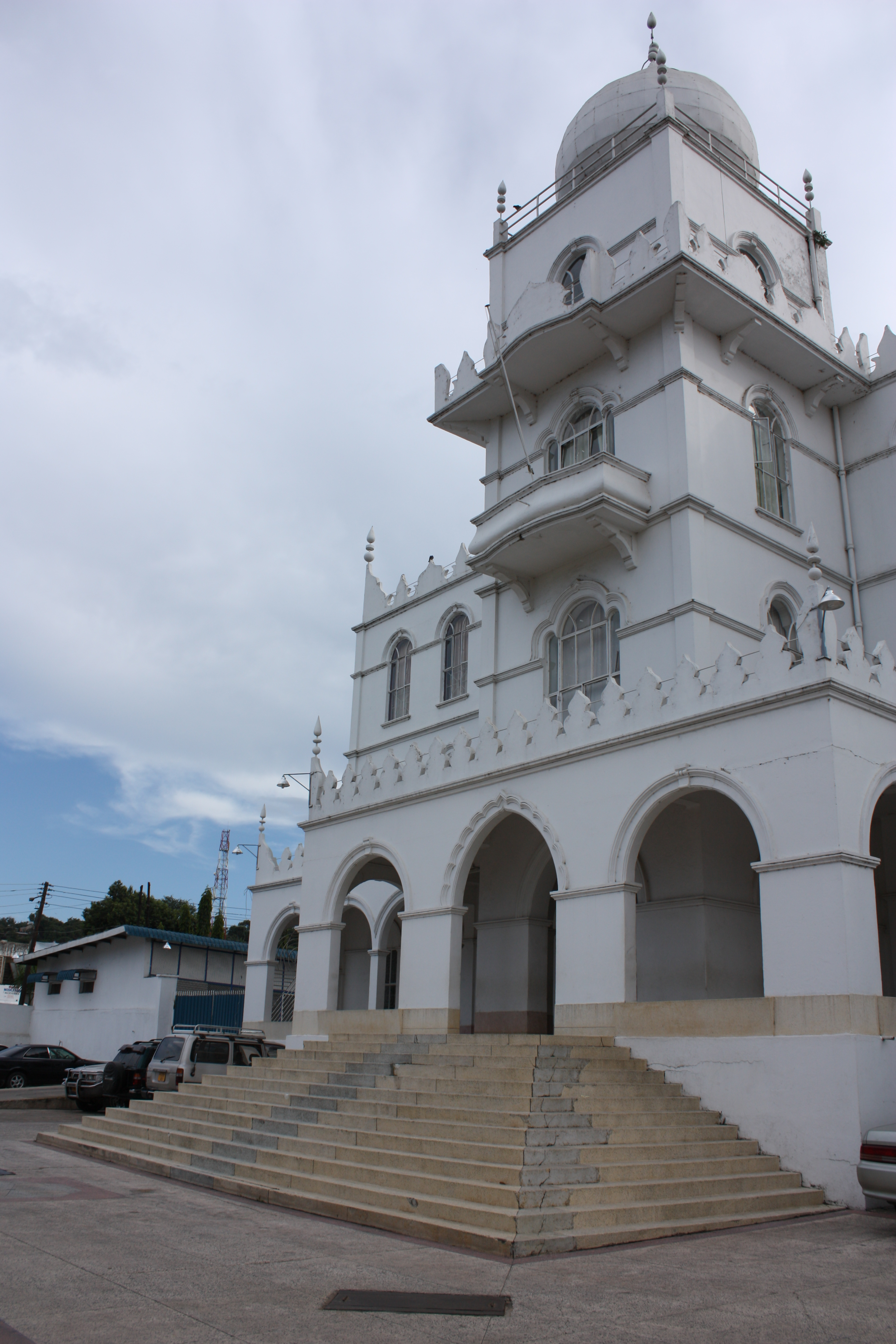
The Jamatkhana Mosque.

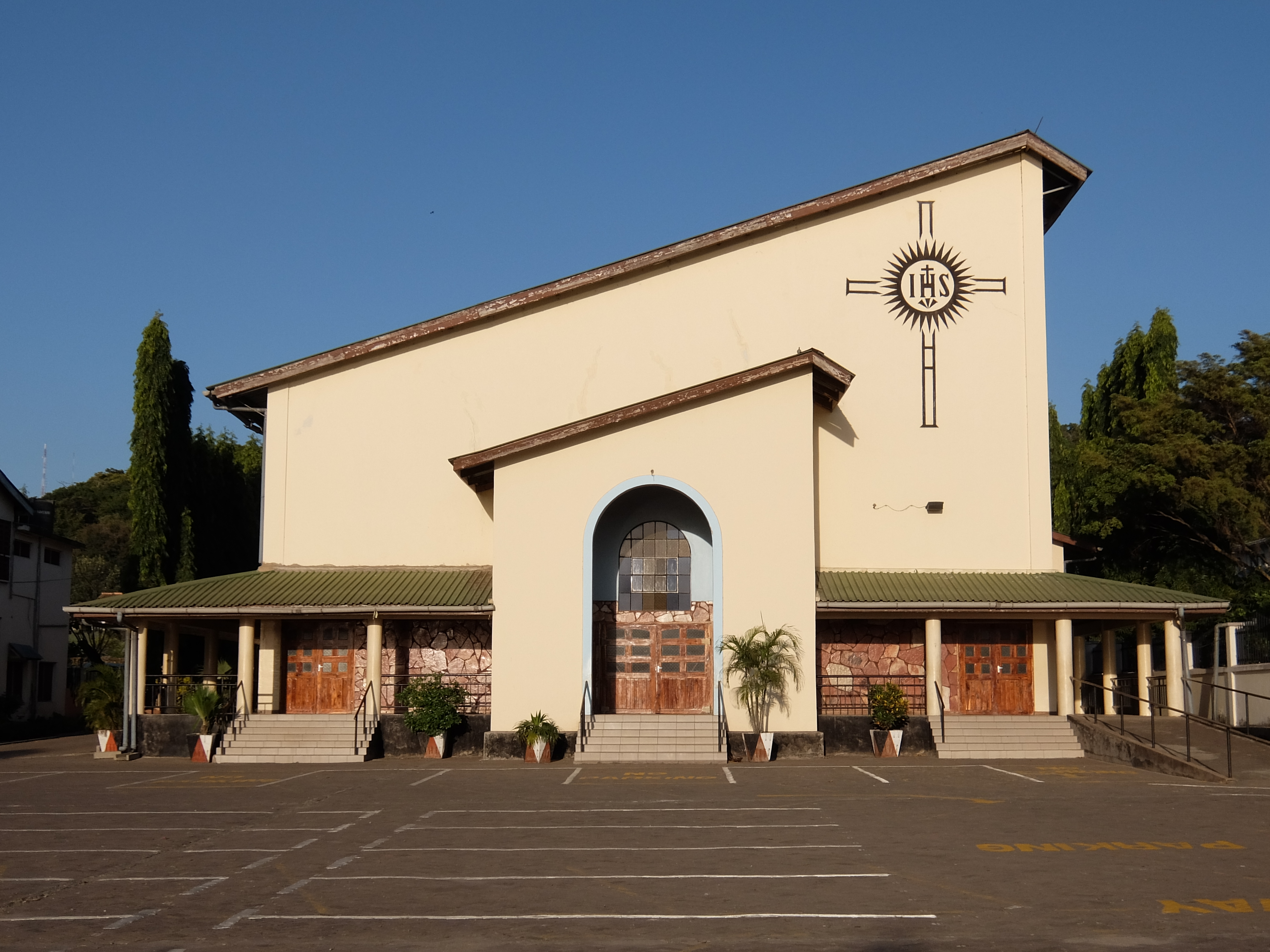
The Nyakahoja Catholic Church.

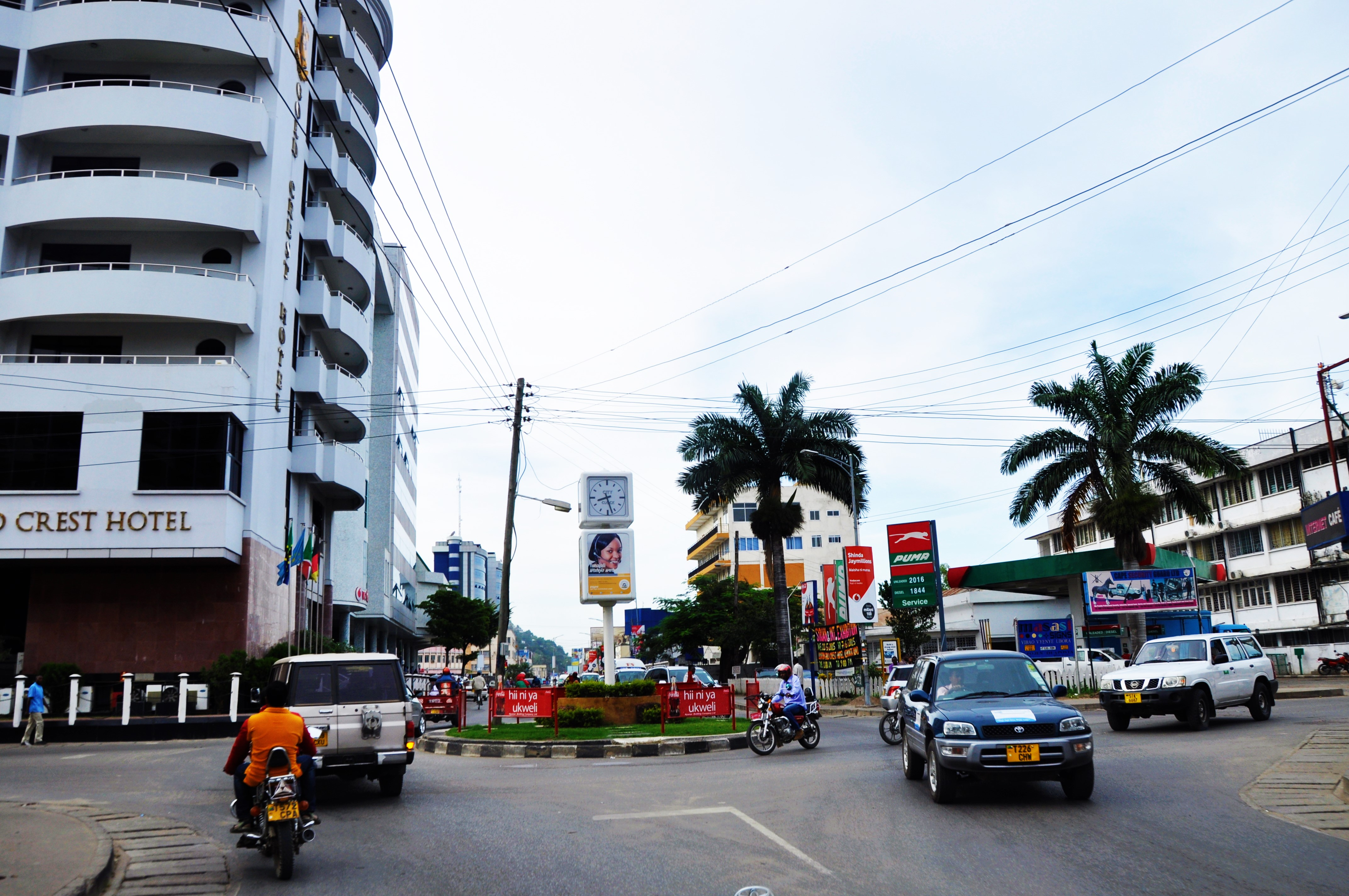
A street sight of Mwanza downtown.

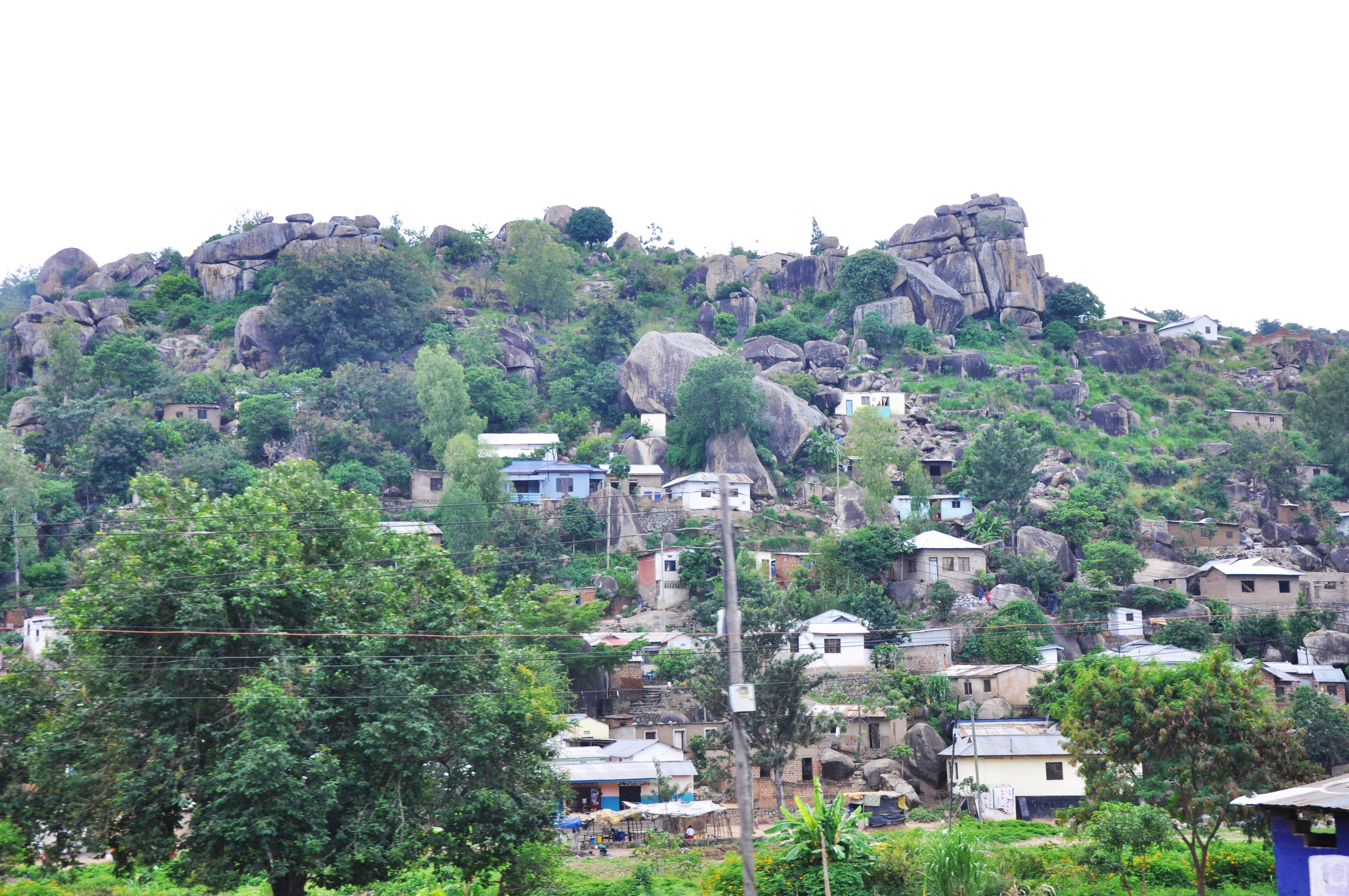
Mwanza a city among the rocks.

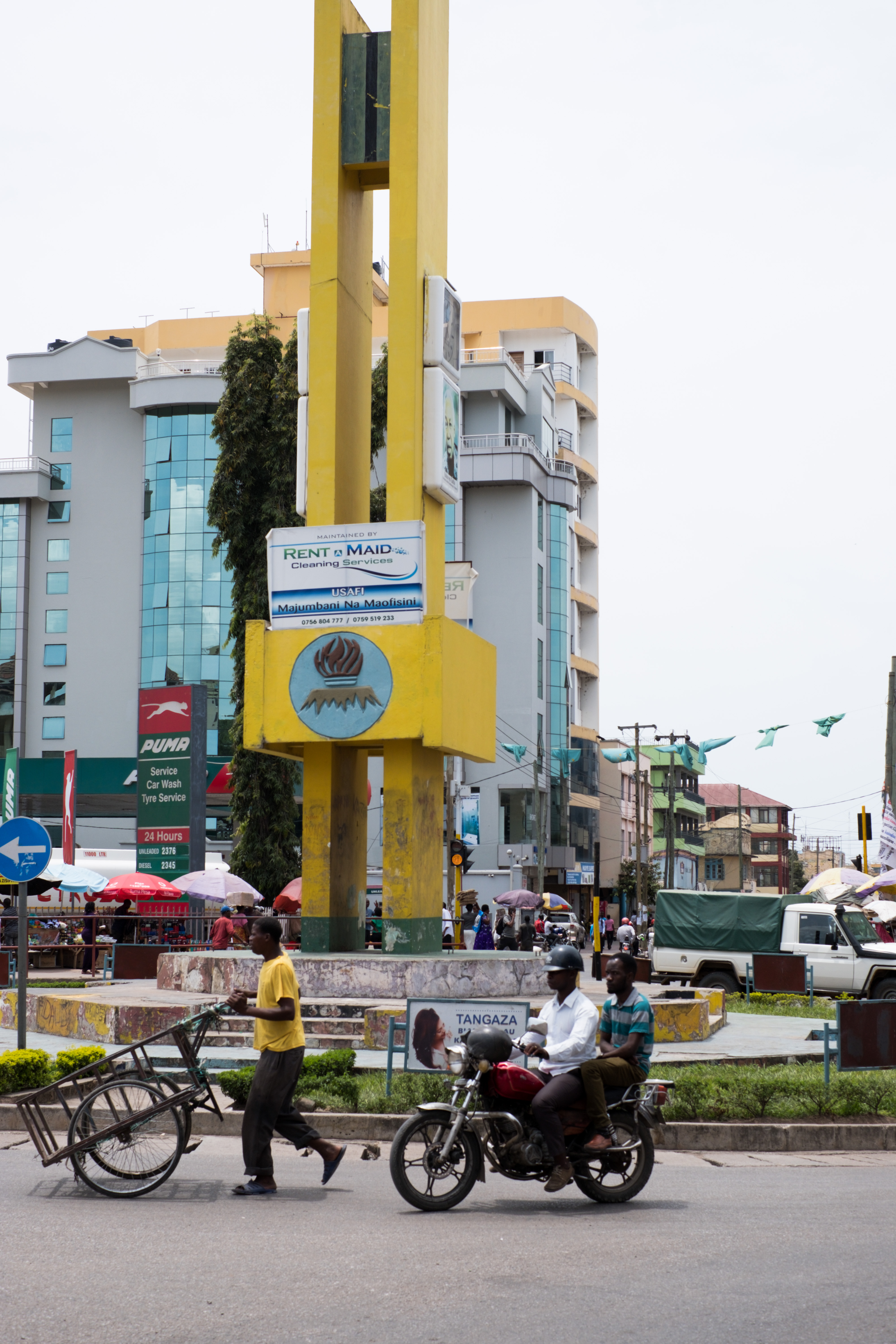
Nyerere road, Mwanza

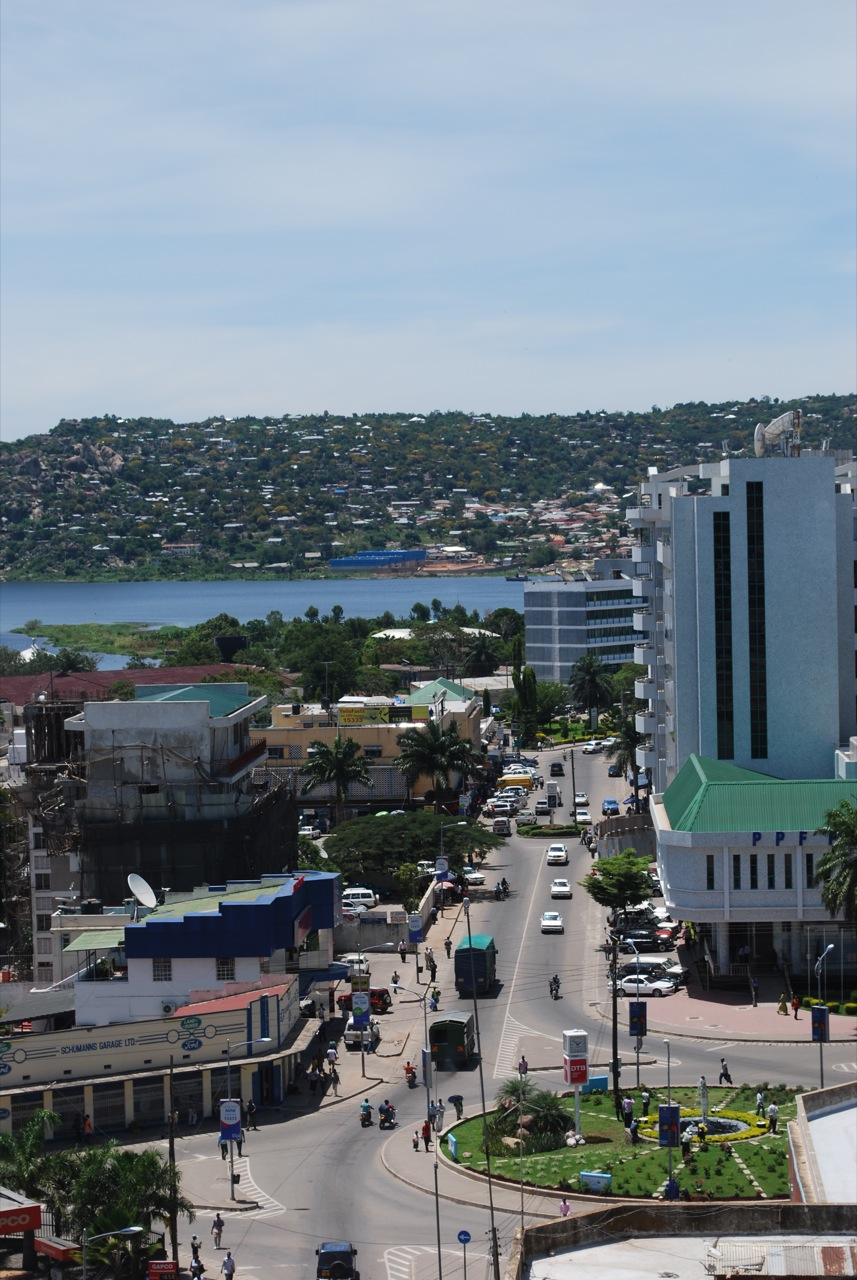
The Mwanza city centre.

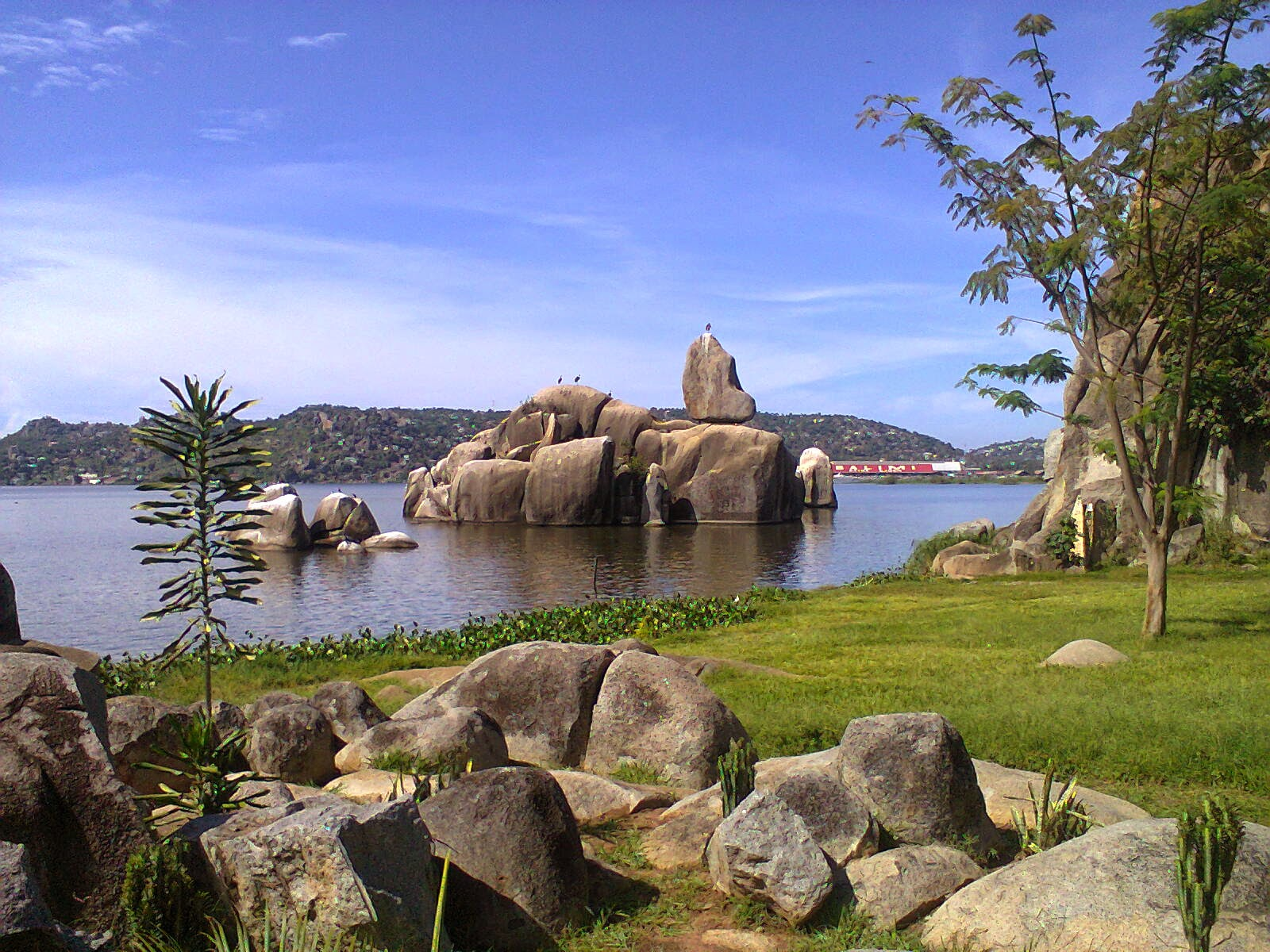
Bismark rock in Rock city.

== See also ==
- Community Development and Relief Agency
- Peter Le Jacq, Maryknoll medical missionary
