= Mbogwe District =

- District
- Mbogwe District of Geita Region.
- Coordinates: 03°22′S 032°9′E
- Country: Tanzania
- Region: Geita Region

Area
  - Total: 2,281 km^{2} (881 sq mi)

Population (2022)
  - Total: 362,855
  - Density: 159.1/km^{2} (412.0/sq mi)

Mbogwe District is one of the five districts of Geita Region of Tanzania. It is bordered to the north by Chato District and Geita District, to the east by Kahama Rural District and Kahama Urban District, to the south by Kahama Rural District, and to the west by Bukombe District.

As of 2022, the population of Mbogwe was 362,855. Mbogwe was established in 2012, when it was split off from Bukombe District and became part of the newly established Geita Region.

== Transport ==
Mbogwe District is connected by paved trunk road T3 (from Morogoro to the Rwanda border), that passes through the district from east to west.

== Wards ==
As of 2012, Mbogwe District was administratively divided into 16 wards.

The 12 wards in 2012:

- Bukandwe
- Ikobe
- Ikunguigazi
- Ilolangulu
- Iponya
- Isebya
- Lugunga
- Lulembela
- Masumbwe
- Mbogwe
- Mgemo
- Nanda
- Ng'homolwa
- Nyakafulu
- Nyasato
- Ushirika
