= Sungusungu =

Tanzanian organizations

Sungusungu (sometimes Sungu Sungu or Busalaman) are Tanzanian justice organizations established originally by the Sukuma and Nyamwezi ethnic groups in 1981 to protect cattle from theft and other property. These organizations operate at the community level and enforce a variety of different rules. The group was deputized by the Tanzanian government in 1989. In some regions "they ended up being more influential than the Tanzanian Police Force." Human rights groups have criticized the organizations for being vigilantes who have murdered people without trials. In neighboring Kenya, the name Sungusungu describes a particular vigilante organization which has been banned since 2007.

== Tanzania ==
The Sungusungu were started in 1981 by Sukuma and Nyamwezi communities in order to deal with cattle theft. While they were initially developed as a focused network of actors communicating with other communities whenever thefts occurred, they quickly developed into formal organizations hearing allegations of wrongdoing, setting punishment, and punishing those found guilty.

Their name is often taken to be a reference to the Swahili word sungusungu which refers to a local species of army ants. Human Rights Watch notes that the term "initially used to refer to a vigilante group formed to combat cattle rustling in western Tanzania in the 1980s; more recently, the term has come to be used to describe any neighborhood militia."

The groups were outside the government system until reforms in the late 1980s and early 1990s legalized their existence and gave them the ability to detain and try criminals. They are sometimes used by the government to perform specific law enforcement tasks. In 2001, the Sungusungu were used to escort 3,000 Ugandans who had been living in Tanzania to the border.

In recent years, they have been accused of a number of human rights abuses. The group was blamed by Maasai herders in Kilosa District for fueling violence between the Maasai and farmers in the region in 2000. The violence was reported to have caused at least 30 deaths. They have been accused of murdering criminals without a legal trial and individuals accused of witchcraft.

== Kenya ==
In Kenya, the Sungusungu are one of a number of protection or vigilante organizations that developed in the 1990s and was banned by the government in 2007. Similarly to the Tanzanian groups, Sungusungu formed in the late 1990s to protect communities from cattle theft. In the early 2000s, they were accused of a range of criminal violence. In 2006, they were accused of intimidating and murdering witnesses in the case of the illegal detention and torture of journalist Peter Makori.

The Sungusungu were banned with 17 other "vigilante groups" on 1 March 2007. Since that point, the groups has been accused a number of times with restarting violent activity. In 2010, they were accused of a series of killings in the Nyamira District. In 2016, top police officials in the country have reiterated their efforts to prevent the Sungusungu from reestablishing themselves.
