= Zinza people =

Ethnic group from Geita Region of Tanzania

The Zinza (Swahili: Wazinza) are a Bantu ethnolinguistic group from the southwestern Islands on Lake Victoria, Tanzania. The Zinza people also lived on the shores of Geita Region's Chato District and Geita District and Mwanza Region. In 1987, the Zinza population was estimated to be 138,000 .

== See also ==
- List of ethnic groups in Tanzania
