= Rubondo Island National Park =

National Park of Tanzania

- Hifadhi ya Taifa ya Kisiwa cha Rubondo
- IUCN category II (national park)
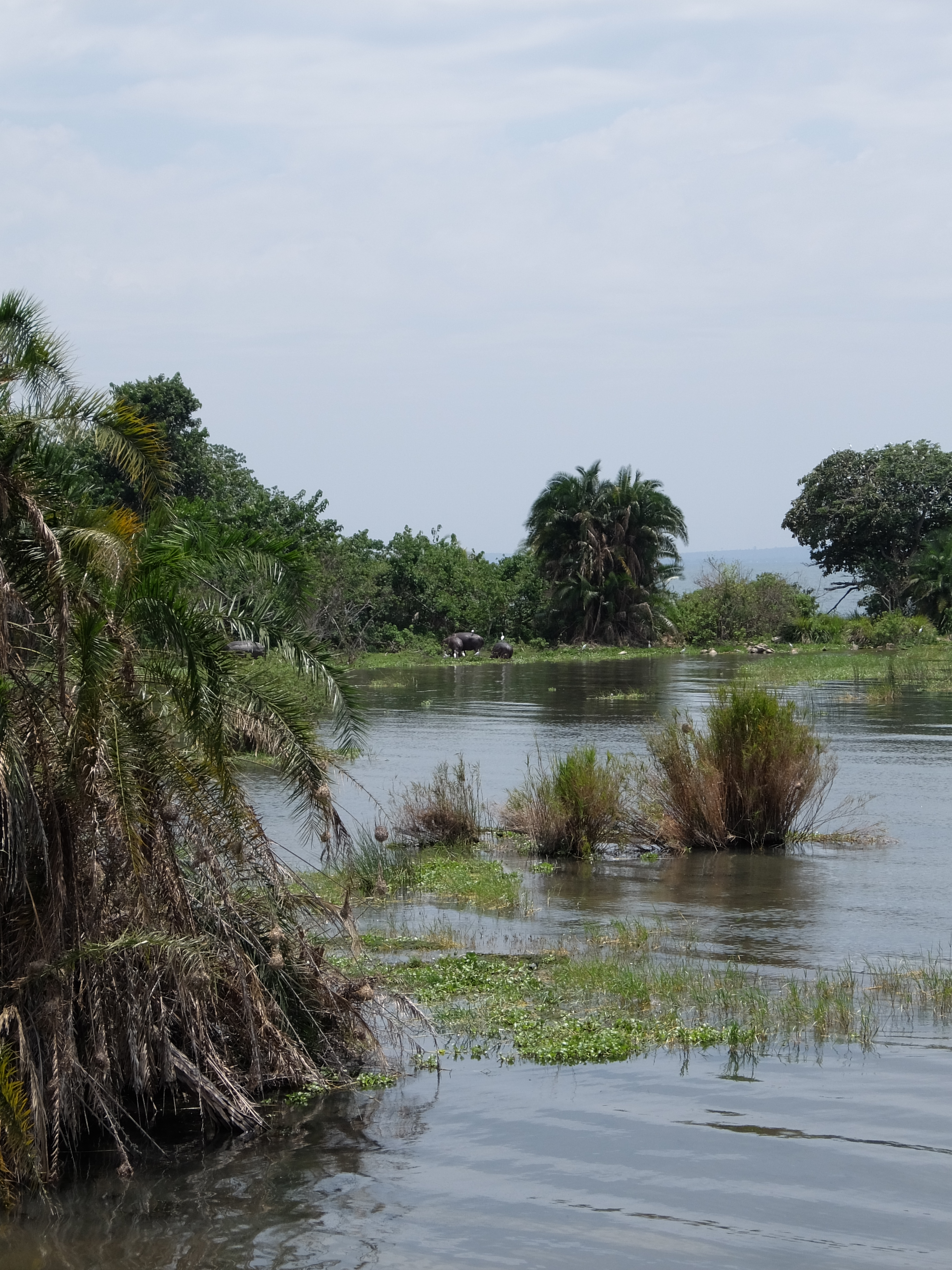
- Hippos of Rubondo

- Location within Tanzania
- Location: Tanzania, Geita Region, Geita District
- Nearest city: Chato, Tanzania
- Coordinates: 02°20′18″S 31°51′31″E
- Area: 456.8 km^{2} (176.4 sq mi)
- Established: 1965
- Visitors: 1,500 (in 2012)
- Governing body: Tanzanian National Parks Authority
- Website: www.tanzaniaparks.go.tz

Rubondo Island National Park is a national park on an island in Lake Victoria, Tanzania, with a size of 456.8 km^{2} (176.4 sq mi).

== Geography ==
Rubondo Island is located in the south-western corner of Lake Victoria, Tanzania. Rubondo Island is about 150 km (93 mi) west of Mwanza. The main island, Rubondo (2^{o} 18’ S, 31^{o} 50’ E) is 237 km^{2} in size. The island protects another 11 islets, none much larger than 2 km^{2}. These 10 islands form the Rubondo Island National Park covering an area of 456.8 km^{2} (176.4 sq mi). Lake Victoria is 1,134 metres above sea level. The highest point on Rubondo is the Masa Hills in the far south, at an elevation of 1,486m (350m above the level of the lake). The main island measures 28 km from north to south and is 3–10 km wide. Rubondo Island is on a rift in the lake. Rubondo essentially consists of a partially submerged rift of four volcanically formed hills, linked by three flatter isthmuses. The island has no rivers and the soil is volcanic. The habitat is mixed evergreen and semideciduous forest, which covers about 80% of the island’s surface area with common species including Croton sylvaticus, Drypetes gerrardii, and Lecaniodiscus fraxinifolius, and often with a dense understory of lianas, or woody vines. The forest is interspersed with patches of open grassland and, all but restricted to the Lukaya area, acacia woodland. The eastern lakeshore is characterised by rocky areas and sandy beaches whilst the western shore supports extensive papyrus swamps, lined with date palms.

== Climate ==
There is a bimodal rainfall distribution, with peaks in December and April–May during the October–May rainy season. The annual temperature is 19–26 °C.

== History ==
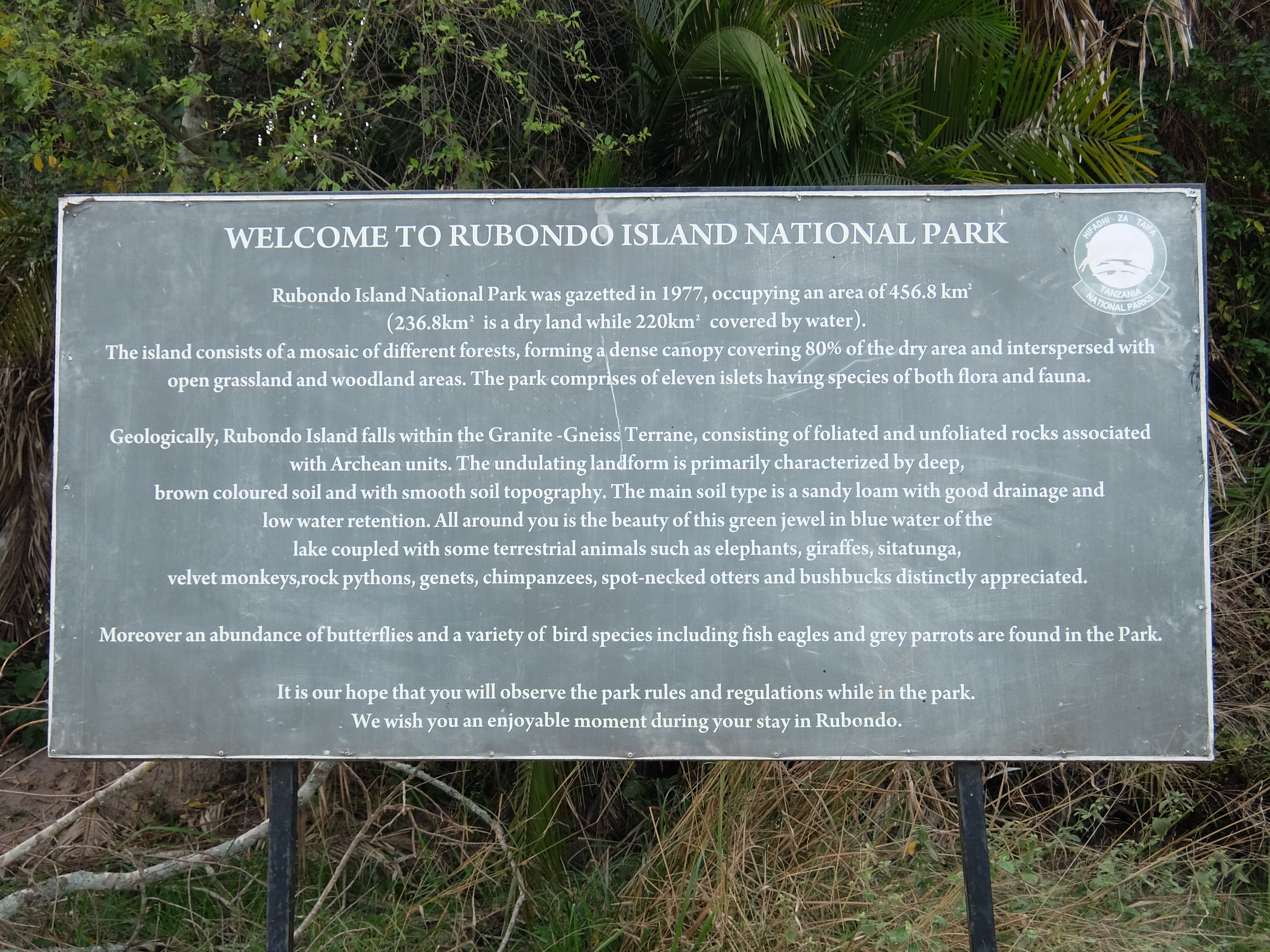
Welcome to Rubondo Island National Park.

Rubondo Island became a game reserve in 1965, to provide a sanctuary for animals. It was gazetted as a national park in 1977. Today Rubondo is uninhabited. Consequently, 80% of the island remains forested today. The 400 “fisher folk” of the Zinza tribe, who lived on the island and maintained banana plantations, were resettled on neighbouring islands and onto the mainland by the government in the late 1960s. Courts have passed sentences of six weeks imprisonment for unauthorised landings on the island and six months for attempted poaching.

== Animal introductions ==
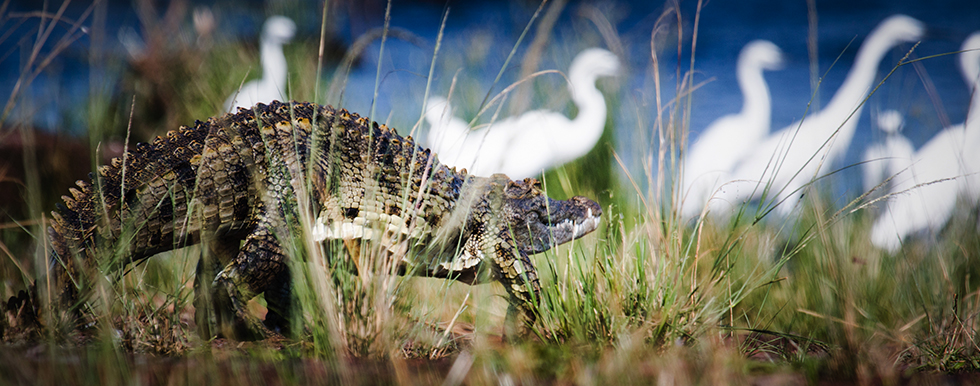
Crocodile on Rubondo

Over a four-year period (1966–1969) Professor Bernhard Grzimek of the Frankfurt Zoological Society (FZS) released 17 chimpanzees in four cohorts onto Rubondo Island. The first cohort of chimpanzees arrived in Dar es Salaam aboard the German African Line’s steamship Eibe Oldendorff on 17 June 1966 (Standard Newspaper Tanzania, 1966). The animals had no rehabilitation or pre-release training. The chimpanzees were all wild-born and purportedly of West African descent, although there are no records of specific country of origin for the majority of released individuals. The founder chimpanzees had spent varying periods, from 3.5 months to 9 years, in captivity in European zoos or circuses before their release. The chimpanzees after one year were able to find and eat wild foods and construct nests for sleeping, and have now reverted to an unhabituated state characteristic of wild chimpanzees. From 16 founders the population has now grown to around 40 individuals (estimate based on nest counts).

In addition to chimpanzees, seven other species were introduced to the island: roan antelope (Hippotragus equinus) and black rhinoceros (Diceros bicornis) both now extinct, Suni (Neotragus moschatus), African bush elephants (Loxodonta africana), giraffes (Giraffa camelopardalis), mantled guereza (Colobus guereza), and grey parrots (Psittacus erithacus) confiscated from illegal trade.

Common native fauna include the vervet monkey (Chlorocebus aethiops), sitatunga (Tragelaphus spekei), hippopotamus, genet and harnessed bushbuck (Tragelaphus scriptus).

In October 2021, Prime Minister, Kassim Majaliwa visited the park and ordered TANAPA to cooperate with tourism stakeholders, for the marketing of the Rubondo Island to maximise the numbers of tourist in Geita region.
