= Community Development and Relief Agency =

Tanzanian non-governmental organisation

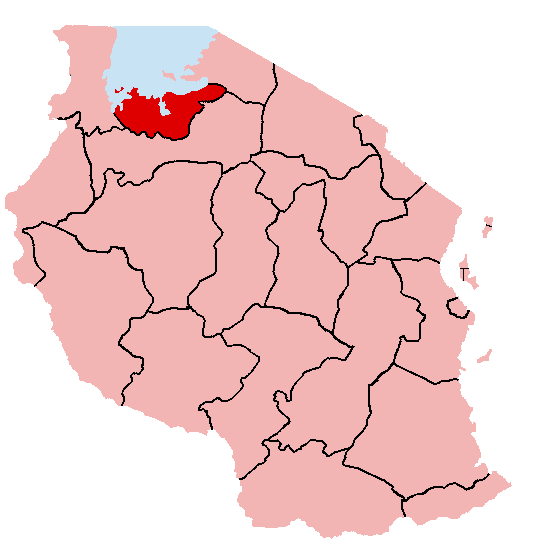
Map of the Mwanza Region

The Community Development and Relief Agency (CODRA) is a Tanzanian Non-Governmental Organisation founded in 2001 to work with the poor or marginalised sections of society and to help them achieve sustainable socio-economic growth.

Their headquarters are in Mwanza city in Northern Tanzania on Lake Victoria. Local project offices are located in Busega and Magu within the Mwanza Region, through which development projects are implemented and monitored. Country offices are located in London, England; Seattle, USA; and Melbourne, Australia. These country offices provide financial, technological support, resource development, and volunteer development.

The Chairman of CODRA is Hon. Dr. Raphael Masunga Chegeni, MP

== Projects ==
=== Water and Sanitation ===
CODRA has worked on the rehabilitation of Kiloleli–Mwamanyili Water scheme project, which entailed the restoration of an old water scheme for 10 villages in two wards of Kiloleli and Mwamanyili in Magu District. The project was successfully completed and the community now has access to safe and clean water. Among other things the project included purchase of two brand new TR3 Lister Peter Generator sets with pumps from Klein, Schanzlin & Becker (a German pump manufacturer) to enable the supply of water from the shore of Lake Victoria at Ihale and Sogesca, rehabilitation of two pump houses, restoration of 25 water drawing points, restoration of old with new pipelines, etc. The rehabilitation included also storage tanks at Ihale and Yitwimila and 2 watchmen posts at Ihale and Sogesca were completed.

=== Health ===
CODRA has supported a full solar energy system for Igalukilo Health centre worth US$5000.00. The project has been successfully installed and completed. The centre caters to about 25,000 people from 10 villages around the area of Nyangili, Mwamagigisi, Mwamujulila, Mwamkala, Lunala, Malangali, Gininiga, Shigala, Busega and Mwamugoba. CODRA has provided an ambulance and medical supplies for Mkula Hospital including wheel chairs, stretchers, bandages, sterilising unit, crutches, dressing, and many more.

=== Microcredit ===
CODRA works with the regional micro-credit saving programs in the region as well as partners with their small business development program.

=== Future Projects ===
CODRA is in an advanced stage in designing and funding a project with the Norwegians for Democratic Support (NDS) through partnership with the Center Party. Likewise, The Government of Japan has approved a Rural Water Supply for Shallow and Medium Wells project for Busega in Magu District.
