= Geita District =

- District
- Geita District's location within Geita Region.
- Coordinates: 02°55′00″S 032°15′00″E
- Country: Tanzania
- Region: Geita
- District: Geita

Population (2022)
  - Total: 1,035,214
- Time zone: UTC+3 (EAT)
- Postcode: 30xxx
- Area code: 028
- Website: District website

Geita District is located in the Geita Region of Tanzania. According to the 2022 census, the population of the district was 1,035,214. The district is bordered to the east by Mwanza Region and Nyang'hwale District, to the south by Shinyanga Region and Mbogwe District, and to the west by Chato District.

== History ==
Prior to the creation of the Geita Region in March 2012, the Geita District was part of the Mwanza Region.

== Transport ==
=== Road ===
Paved trunk road T4 from Mwanza to Bukoba passes through the district from east to west.

== Economy ==
=== Mining ===
Geita Gold Mine is located within Geita District, 4 km west of the town of Geita. The mine is currently being owned and managed by AngloGold Ashanti.

== Tourism ==
Rubondo Island National Park is located on an island in Lake Victoria that is a part of Geita District. It can be reached by ferry from Nkome, a village in the north of the district.

== Wards ==
As of the 2012 census, Geita District council was divided administratively into 35 wards:

1. Bugalama
2. Bugulula
3. Bujula
4. Bukoli
5. Bukondo
6. Bulela
7. Bung'wangoko
8. Busanda
9. Butobela
10. Chigunga
11. Ihanamilo
12. Isulwabutundwe
13. Kagu
14. Kakubilo
15. Kalangalala
16. Kamena
17. Kamhanga
18. Kasamwa
19. Kaseme
20. Katoma
21. Katoro
22. Lubanga
23. Lwamgasa
24. Lwezera
25. Mtakuja
26. Nkome
27. Nyachiluluma
28. Nyakagomba
29. Nyakamwaga
30. Nyamalimbe
31. Nyamigota
32. Nyanguku
33. Nyarugusu
34. Nzera
35. Senga
