= Geita Region =

Region of Tanzania

Geita Region Mkoa wa Geita (Swahili)
- Region
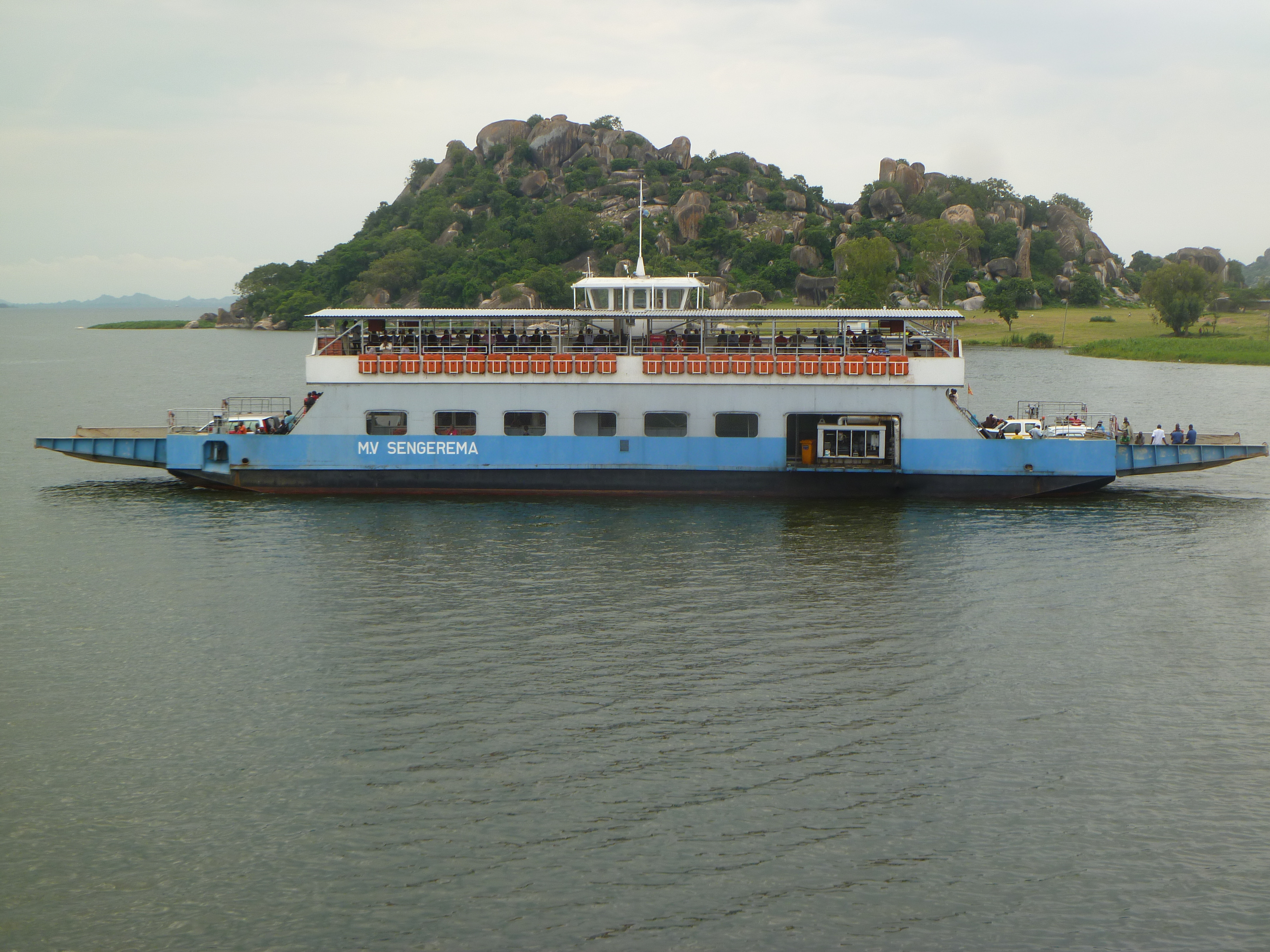
- Ferry from Mwanza to Geita
- Nicknames: The Gold Region, Golden State of Tanzania
- Location in Tanzania
- Coordinates: 2°49′27.12″S 32°15′55.44″E
- Country: Tanzania
- Zone: Lake
- Administrative Region: 2012
- Named for: Geita
- Capital: Geita Municipal
- Districts: List: Geita Urban; Bukombe District; Chato District; Geita District; Mbogwe District; Nyang'hwale District

Government
  - Regional Commissioner: Martin Reuben Shigela
  - Assistant Administrator: Godius Walter Kayharara

Area
  - Total: 20,054 km^{2} (7,743 sq mi)
  - Rank: 21st of 31
- Highest elevation (Mula): 1,519 m (4,984 ft)

Population (2022 census)
  - Total: 2,977,608
  - Rank: 7th of 31
  - Density: 148.48/km^{2} (384.56/sq mi)
- Demonym: Geitan

Ethnic groups
  - Settler: Swahili & Sukuma
  - Native: Zinza, Sumbwa & Haya
- Time zone: UTC+3 (EAT)
- Postcode: 30xxx
- Area code: 028
- ISO 3166 code: TZ-27
- HDI (2021): 0.523 low · 17th of 25
- Website: Official website
- Symbols of Tanzania
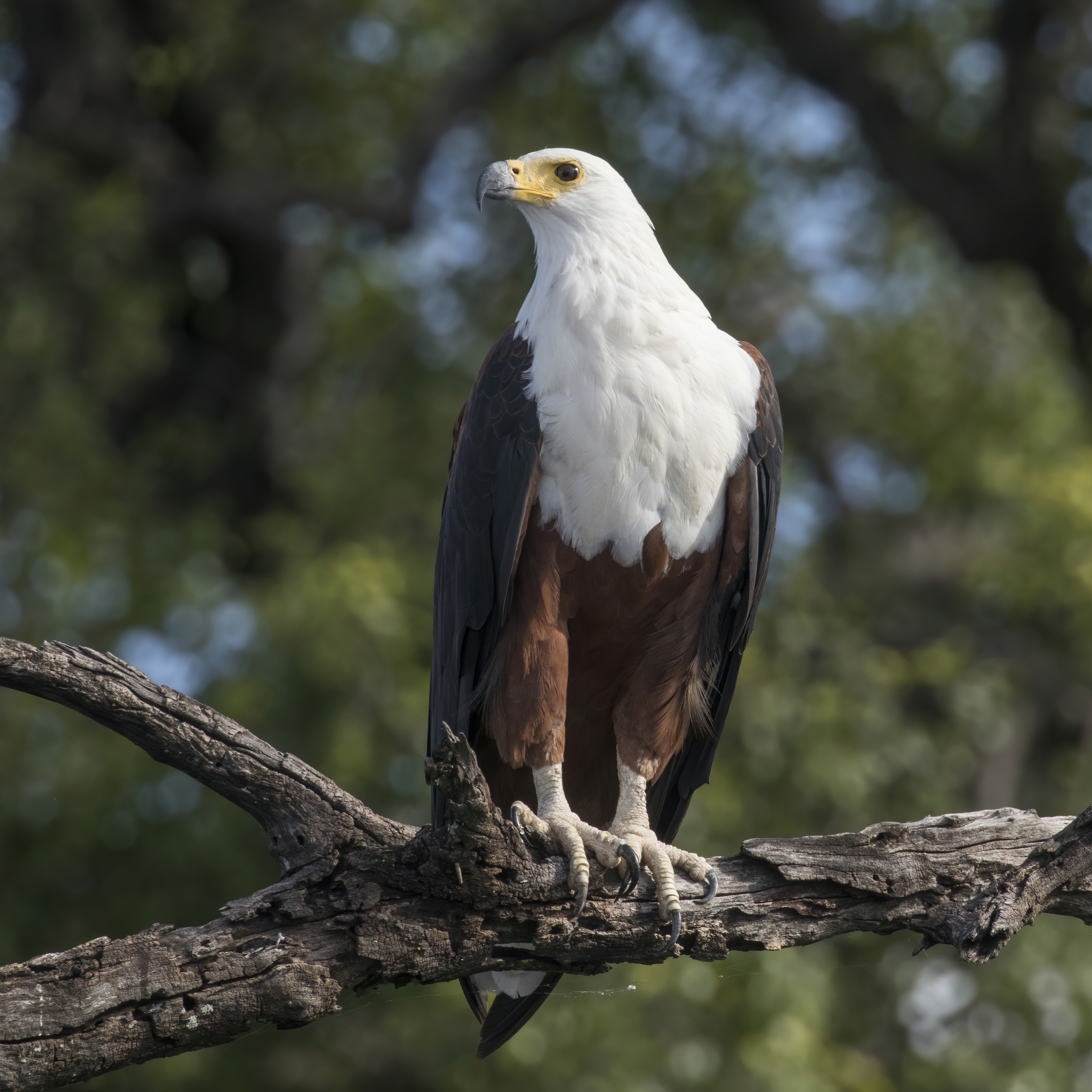
- Bird: African fish eagle

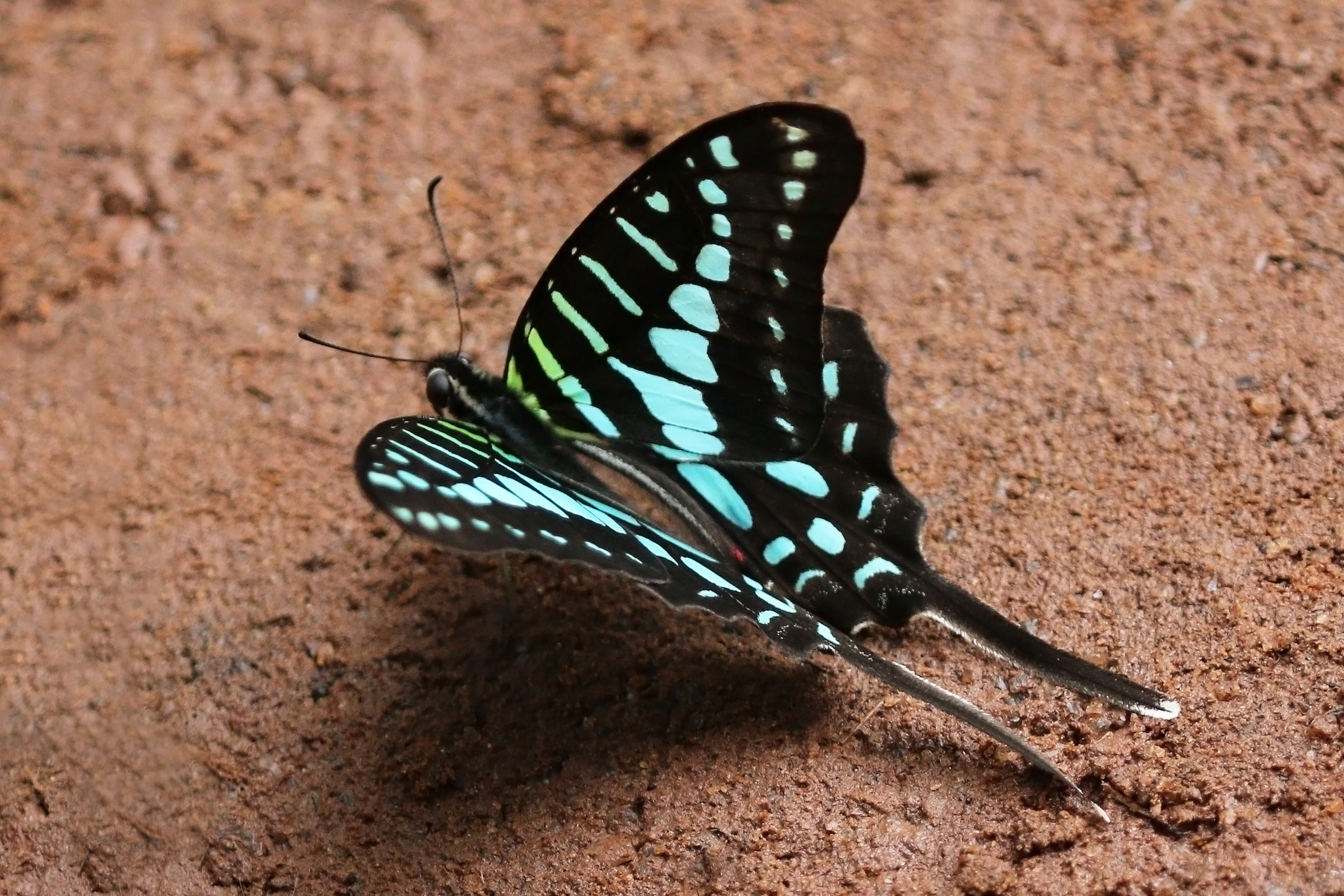
- Butterfly: Graphium policenes
- Fish: Christmas Fulu (Xystichromis phytophagus)
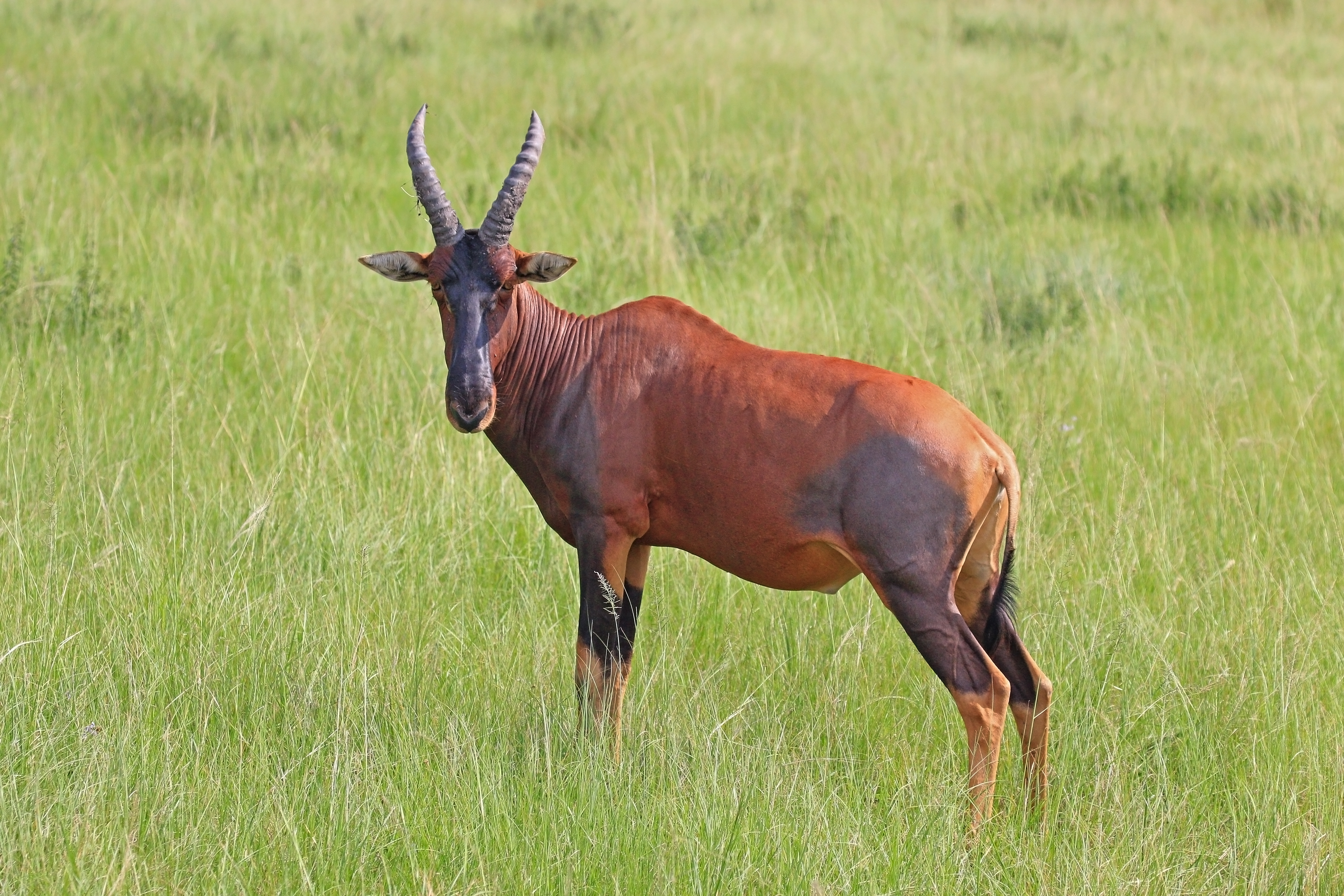
- Mammal: Topi

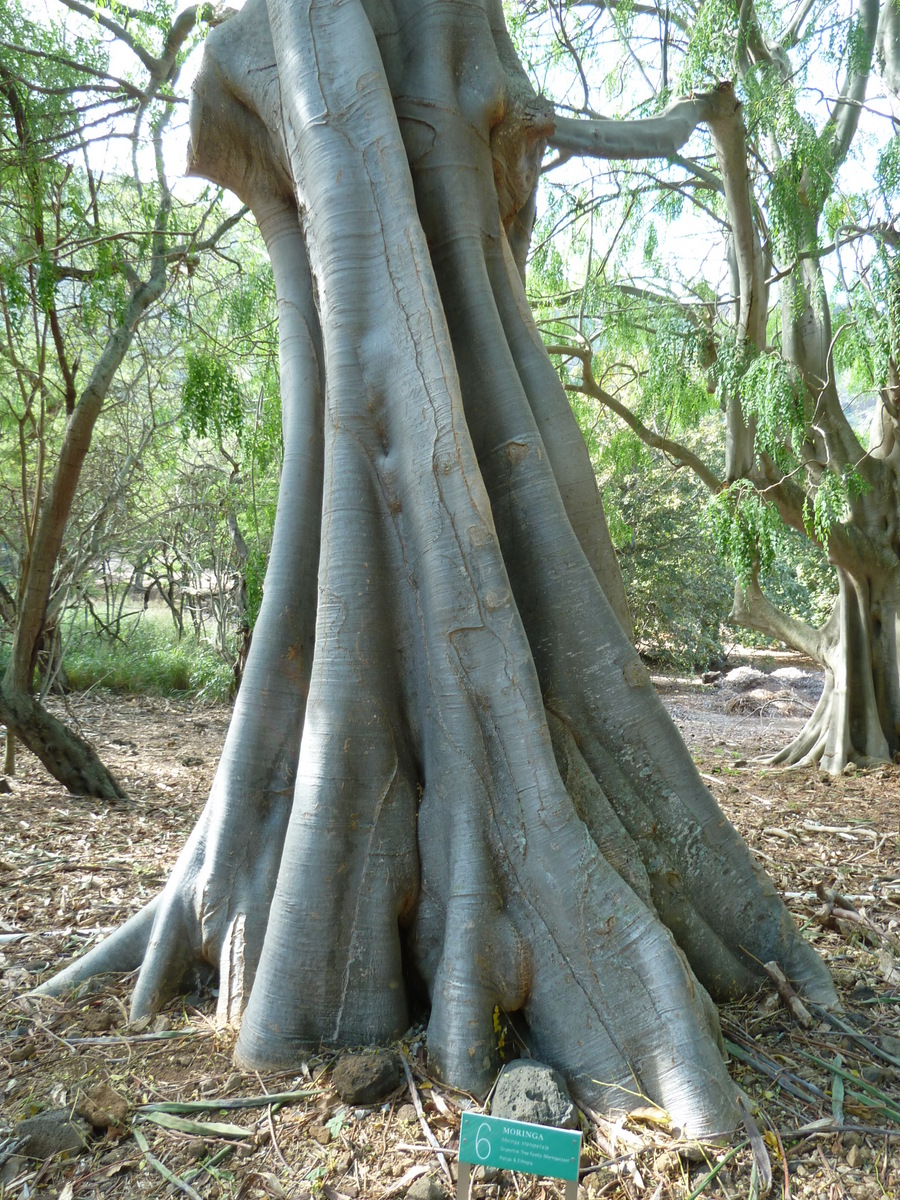
- Tree: Moringa stenopetala

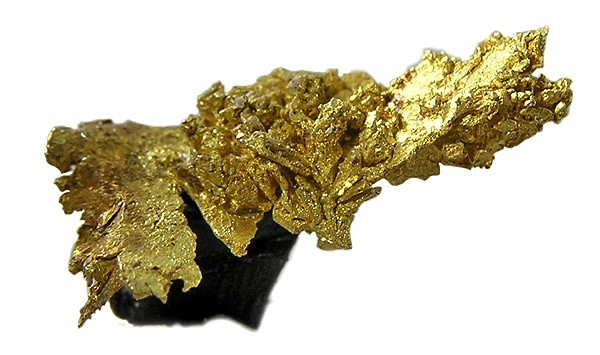
- Mineral: Gold

Geita Region (Swahili: Mkoa wa Geita) is one of Tanzania's 31 administrative regions. The region covers an area of 20,054 km^{2} (7,743 sq mi)."Geita Region Size". The region is comparable in size to the combined land area of the nation state of Slovenia. Geita Region is bordered to the east by Lake Victoria, Mwanza Region and Shinyanga Region. The region is bordered by Tabora Region and Kigoma Region to the south and south west respectively. Lastly, Gieta is borders Kagera Region to the west.

According to national census of 2022, the region had 2,977,608 inhabitants, and ranked among the top 5 regions with high population growth rate. The region's city (capital) is the town of Geita. The region is named after the town of Geita itself. The region is home to Tanzania's largest gold mining industries and was also home to Tanzania's fifth president, the late John Magufuli.

== Geography ==
Geita Region covers an area of 20,054 km^{2} (7,743 sq mi). The region lies between latitudes 2°8' and 3°28' South of the equator and longitudes 31° 15' and 32° 48' East of Greenwich, the Geita Region is situated in Tanzania's northern west. It shares borders with five other regions: Kagera Region to the west and north-west; Tabora and Shinyanga Regions to the south; Shinyanga Region to the south-east; Kigoma Region to the south and south-west; and Mwanza Region to the north and north-east. The region is 1,100 to 1,300 meters above sea level. In the north, the waters of Lake Victoria also encircle the area.

=== Climate ===
Geita region receives between 900 mm (35 in) and 1,200 mm (47 in) of rain each year. Between wet season and dry seasons the temperature varies between 22 °C (72 °F) and 30 °C (86 °F). The primary wet season is from February to May, with the smaller wet season between September and December. The dry season is from June to September.

== History ==
The area was created in March 2012 from sections of the Shinyanga, Kagera, and Mwanza Regions. created were six councils total, one of which is the town council, and five districts from portions of the Shinyanga, Mwanza, and Kagera Regions.

== Demographics ==
The area that is now Geita Region has been inhabited by Bantu peoples for thousands of years. The majority of the people are Basukuma and Sumbwa. There are additionally many Haya, Zinza, and Nyamwezi in the region. The area is the ancestral home to the Zinza people who live on the shore of Lake Victoria.

In 2016 the Tanzania National Bureau of Statistics report there were 1,932,230 in the region, from 1,739,530 in 2012.

Census	Population
2002	1,337,718
2012	1,739,530
2022	2,977,608

== Economy ==
Geita's economy is dominated by the extraction industry especially the mining gold. The Geita Gold Mine is the largest mining operation located within Geita Region, 4 km west of the town of Geita. The mine is currently being owned and managed by AngloGold Ashanti. Other major industries in the region is agriculture and fishing.

Two paved trunk roads pass through the region from east to west: road T3 (from Kahama to the Rwanda border), passes through the south of the region, while road T4 (from Mwanza to Bukoba) passes through the north of the region.

Rubondo Island National Park is located on an island in Lake Victoria that is a part of Geita Region. It can be reached by ferry from Geita and Chato Districts.

Currently the Kigongo–Busisi Bridge is being built to connect the Mwanza Region to the Geita Region across the Gulf of Mwanza of Lake Victoria.

== Administrative divisions ==
The region has 6 council districts, 122 wards, 474 villages, and 2,219 hamlets.

=== Districts ===
Geita Region is divided into six councils. One town council of Geita, and 5 districts councils:

Districts of Geita Region
Map with main roads in green	District	Population (2016)
	Geita Town	192,541
	Bukombe District	249,416
	Chato District	405,575
	Geita District	704,542
	Mbogwe District	215,404
	Nyang'hwale District	164,750
	Total	1,932,230

== Gallery ==
Geita Region
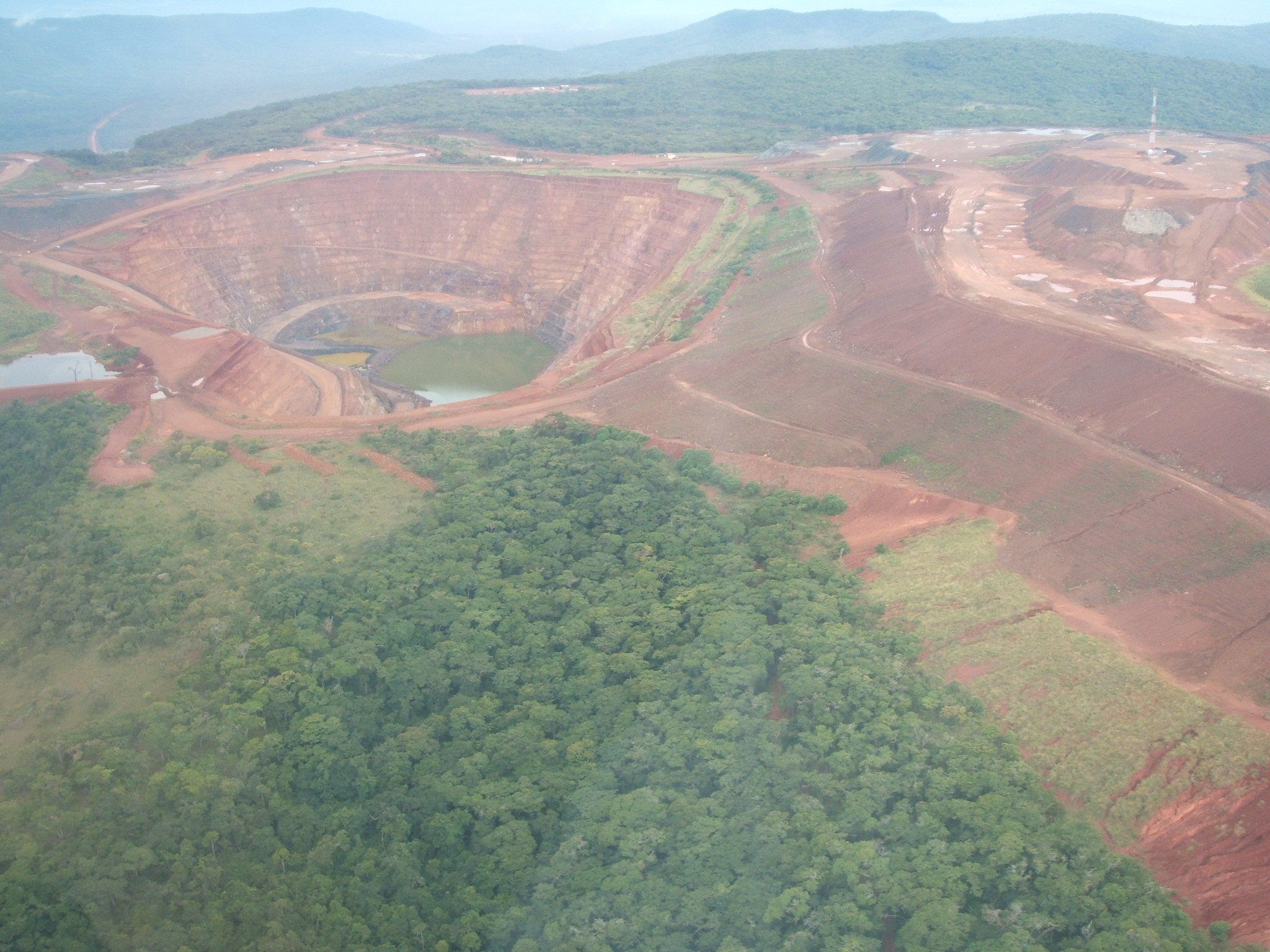
Geita Gold Mine

Rubondo Island in Geita

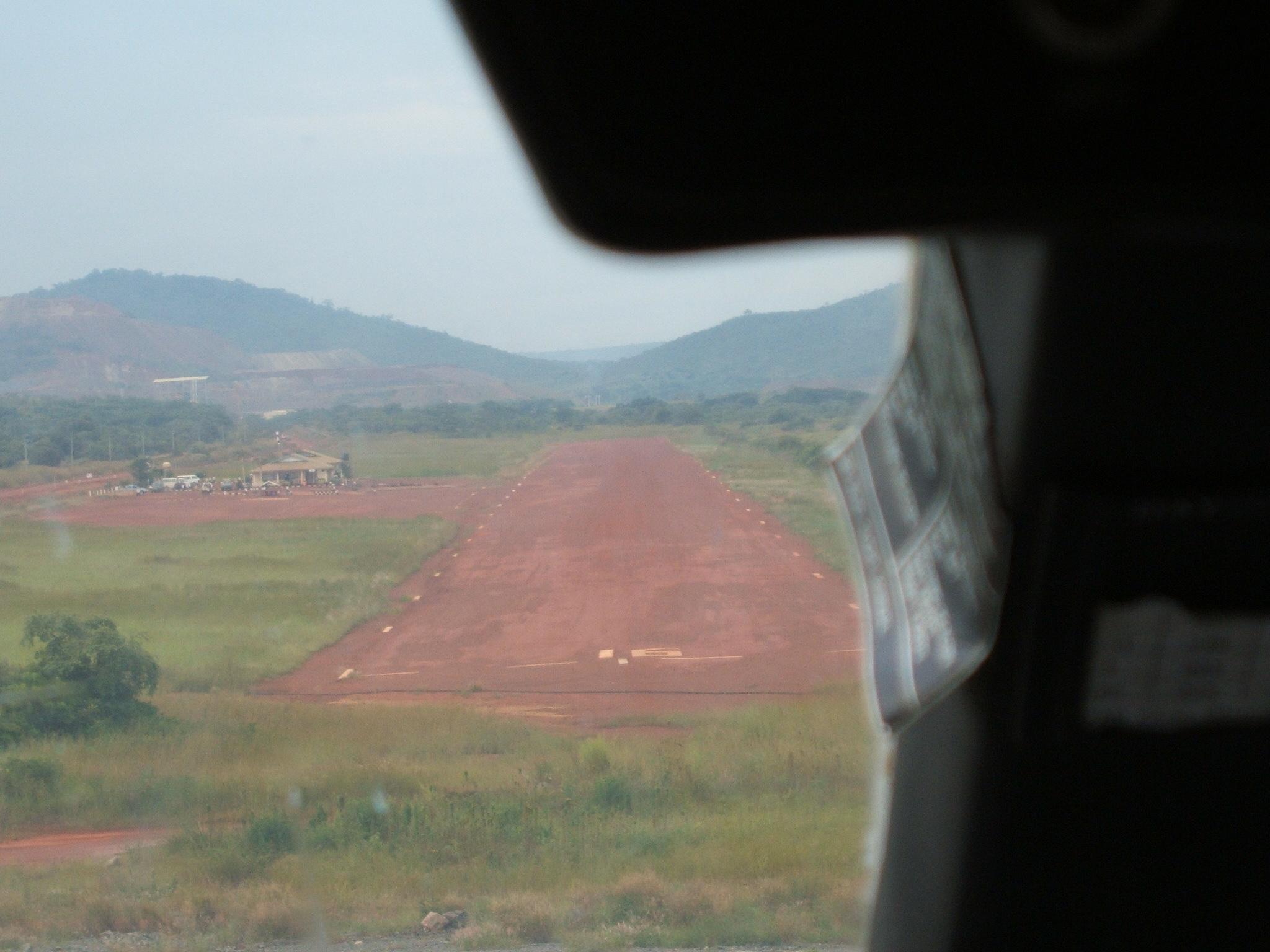
The old airstrip in Geita in 2005.

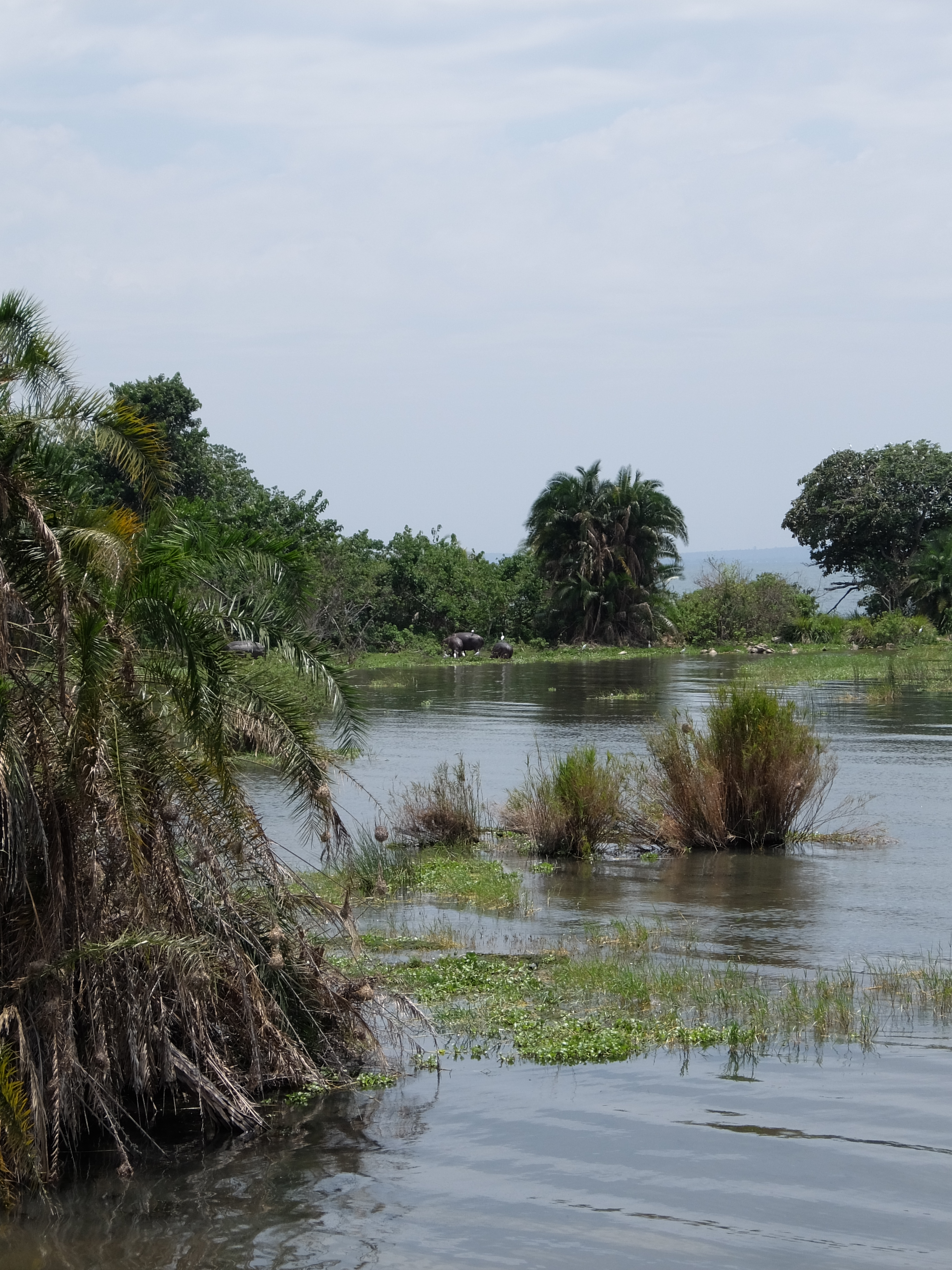
Rubondo Island and Lake Victoria, with hippos in the background.

== Notable people from Geita Region ==
- John Magufuli - Tanzania's fifth president
