= Sumbwa people =

Ethnic group from Geita Region of Tanzania

The Sumbwa are Bantu group native to Bukombe District, Geita Region in central Tanzania. In 1987 the Sumbwa population was estimated to be 191,000 . Sumbwa is a tribe that has had its own traditions and good practices. One of their traditional dance is mulekule.
