= Sukuma people =

Ethnic group of Tanzania

Sukuma
Basukuma
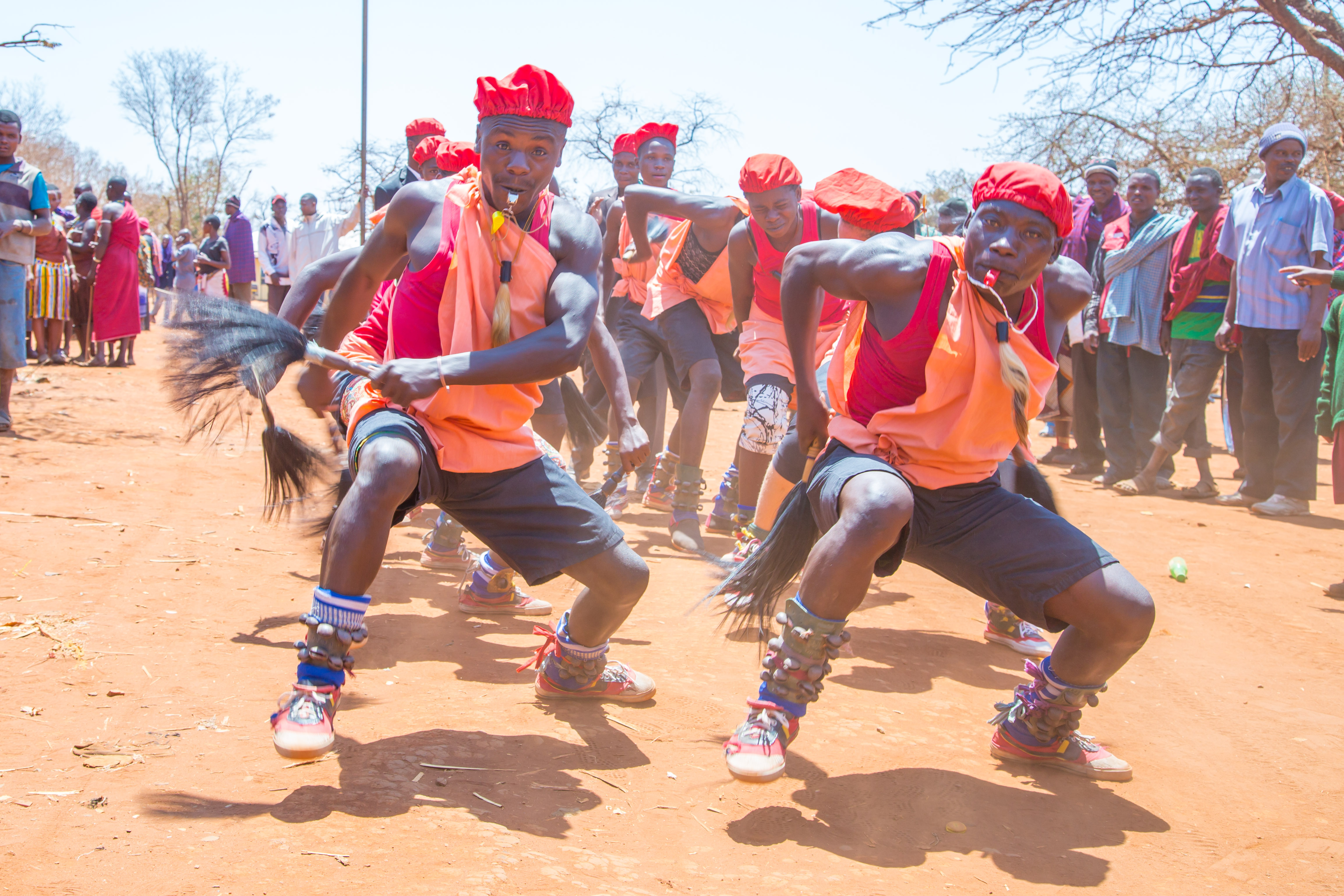
- Sukuma dancers

Total population
- 10,210,000
- 9,75668 (Congo DRC)

Regions with significant populations
- TanzaniaNorthern Congo DRC, Uganda

Languages
- Sukuma, Swahili and English

Religion
- Christianity, Islam, Traditional African religions

Related ethnic groups
- Nyamwezi, Kimbu and Sumbwa

Sukuma
- Person: Nsukuma
- People: Basukuma
- Language: Kisukuma
- Country: Busukuma

The Sukuma (Swahili: Wasukuma) are a Bantu ethnic group from the southeastern African Great Lakes region. They are the largest ethnic group in Tanzania and North Western Uganda, with an estimated 10 million members or 16 percent of the country's total population. Sukuma means "north" and refers to "people of the north." The Sukuma refer to themselves as Basukuma (plural) and Nsukuma (singular). They migrate from North Western Uganda to Tanzania to keeping animals and agriculture activities.

== Homeland ==
The Sukuma live in northwestern Tanzania on or near the southern shores of Lake Victoria, and various areas of the administrative districts of the Mwanza, southwestern tip of Mara Region, Simiyu Region and Shinyanga Region. The northern area of their residence is in the Serengeti Plain. Sukuma families have migrated southward, into the Rukwa Region and Katavi Region, encroaching on the territory of the Pimbwe. These Sukuma have settled outside Pimbwe villages.

The Sukuma land is mostly a flat, scrubless savannah plain between 910 and 1,220 metres (3,000 and 4,000 ft) elevation. Twenty to forty inches (51 to 102 cm) of rain fall from November to March. High temperatures range from 26 to 32 °C (79 to 90 °F) while lows at night seldom drop below 15 °C (59 °F). The population is spread out among small farm plots and sparse vegetation.

== History ==
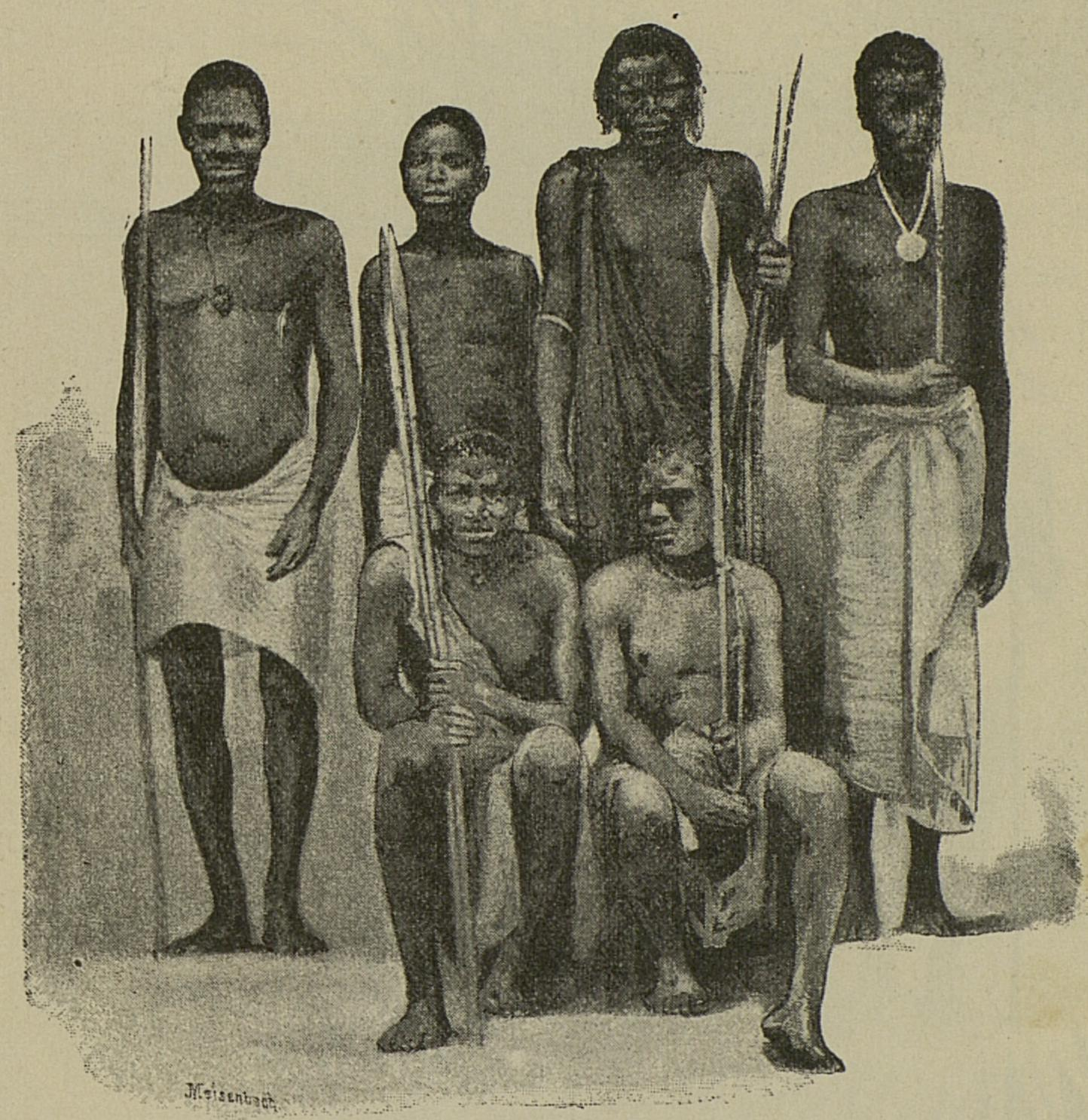
Wasukuma (circa 1890)

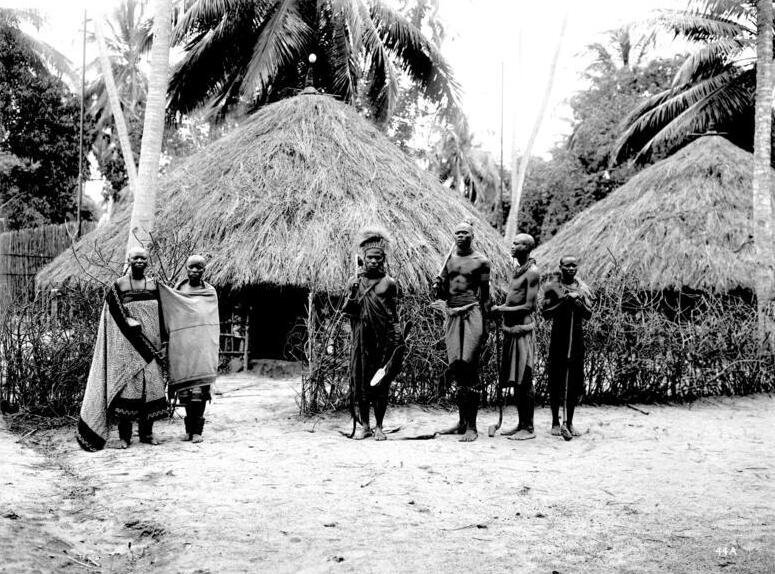
A Sukuma village some time between 1906 and 1918.

As with the Nyamwezi, all members of the five groups in Greater Unyamwezi identified themselves as Wanyamwezi to those outside of the "greater" area, but among themselves use Sukuma. They call themselves "Sukuma" (Northerners) when speaking to Nyamwezi, but use Nyamwezi when speaking to anyone else. The groups can be called the Nyamwezi–Sukuma complex, for, while never united, they were very closely related in attitude and way of life. Like most of their neighbors, they were an ethnic group divided into many smaller groups. Some claim they were a Nyamwezi people who had moved northwestward to escape Mirambo's raids with the result that game and tsetse re-occupied the deserted area.

Unyanyembe, the most important kingdom of the Nyamwezi, centered on Tabora and obtained its meat supplies from the Sukuma. By 1892, however, the herds of cattle began to decline due to rinderpest and tsetse fly, and while two-thirds of German East Africa became unsuitable for cattle, and cattle in general probably did not recover until after the First World War, large valuable herds of cattle were retained by the Sukuma who were then still able to escape any great social change by exploiting the herds economically. Sukuma tradition suggests that famine did become more common towards the end of the nineteenth century, leaving conservative Sukuma blaming religious innovation for the natural disasters and expecting regular sacrifices for the household or chiefdom ancestors.

As with all Nyamwezi, the Sukuma, being agriculturalists, ridged their fields to accommodate the fertile but rather arid region. At the same time they had herds, but since "mixed" farming was practiced they were not considered pastoralists. Sukumaland also contained and used iron deposits, re-exporting some 150,000 iron hoes to Tabora.

== Culture ==
The Sukuma believe in spirit possession and have a holistic view the world as interconnected with all living things, natural and supernatural.

=== Traditional medicine ===
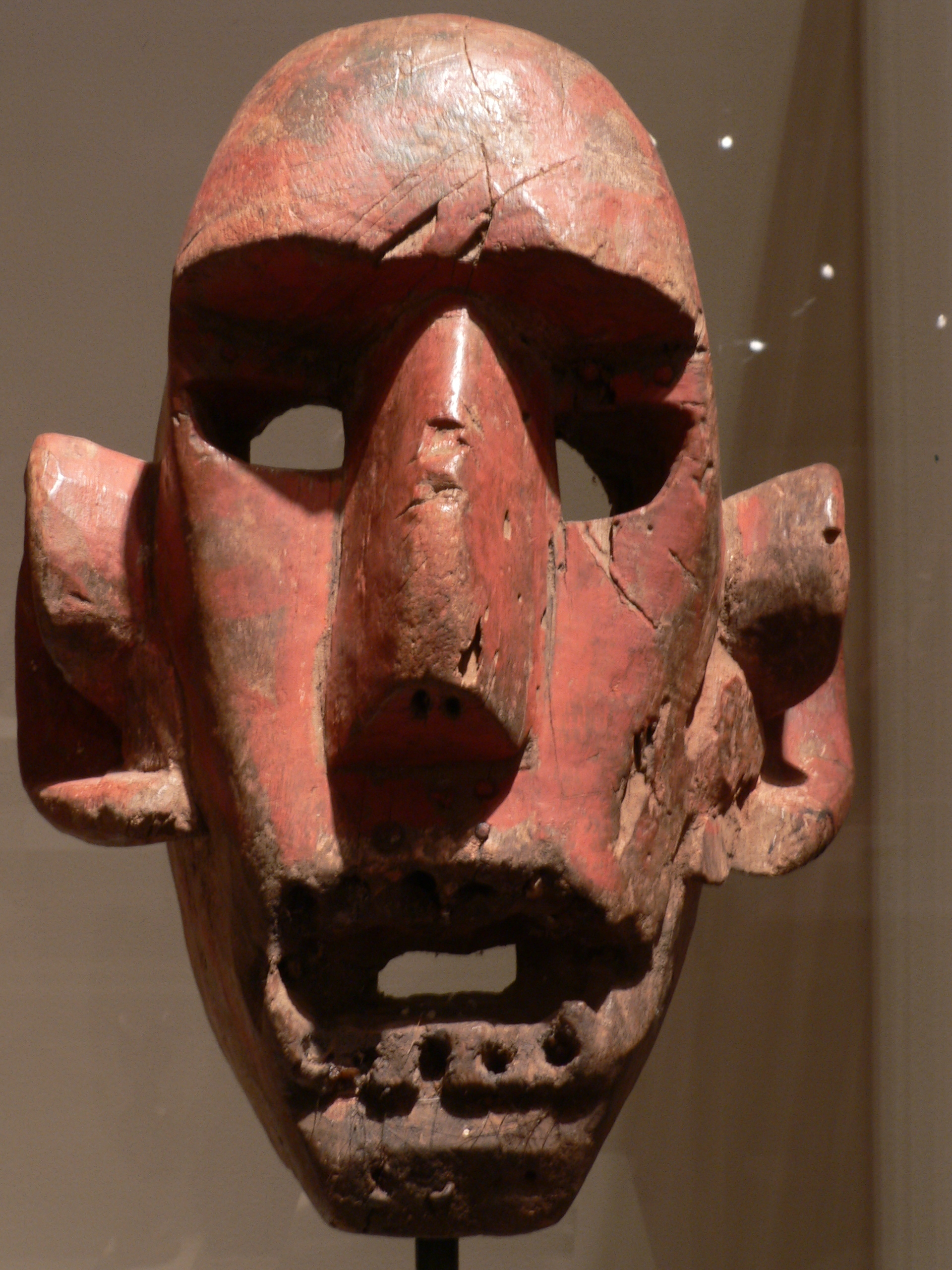
Sukuma mask, 20th cent.

The Sukuma are one of many ethnic groups who use animals in their traditional medicine, also known as "zootherapy." Like other African groups including the Eswatini Inyangas many believe that traditional medicines derived from animals are more effective than Western-style medicine. Plants and animals have been the basis for Sukuma medicine for centuries; however, nowadays plant medicines are used more. The Sukuma people use a system of naming that allows them to distinguish animals according to their medical purposes. Healers organize faunal medicines by first taking a list of known diseases and their symptoms, then making another list of plants, animals, and their healing properties.

Within the communities, healers are the ones who direct what and how each animal will be used. For example, pangolins are believed to be a sign for a good harvest year, so healers will sell pangolin scales to protect crops. Because snakes and porcupines are a danger to people and crops in Sukumaland, medicine men and healers captured them to be used as entertainment.

There is little information on the Sukuma tribes' use of animals in their medicine because most of the research that has been done on the medicinal practices of this tribe has been plant based. A study was conducted in the Busega District of Tanzania, an area comprising the Serengeti Game Reserve and Lake Victoria, to determine which faunal resources healers use to treat illnesses within the community. Many of the traditional medicines, referred to as dawa, are no longer practiced, as many Sukuma tribe members rely more on Western-style medicine.

The biggest threat to conservation in Tanzania is the legal and illegal trafficking of wild animals for pets. There are also weak policies for regulating the census of endangered animals. Traditional healers do not pose as big of a threat to conservation efforts as commercial hunters do. Unlike the latter group, traditional hunters and medicine men only hunt what they need. Other than medicinal purposes, the Sukuma people use animal resources for things such as decoration and clothing. For example, animal skins are used for house decoration and bags.

== Sukuma and Nyamwezi ==
The Nyamwezi (also called Dakama, or people of the South) and Sukuma (also called people of the North) are two closely related ethnic groups that live principally in the region to the south of Lake Victoria in west-central Tanzania. When using ethnic names, they describe themselves as "Banyamwezi" (sing. Munyamwezi) and "Basukuma" (sing. Musukuma) respectively; they refer to their home areas as "Bunyamwezi" or "Unyamwezi," and as "Busukuma." The term "Sukumaland" is sometimes used for the Sukuma area. The name "Sukuma" literally means "north," but it has become a term of ethnic identification.

The Nyamwezi and Sukuma region lies between 2°10′ and 6°20′ S and 31°00′ and 35°00′ E. The Nyamwezi "home" area is in the Tabora Region and western Shinyanga Region, and Sukumaland lies to the north and east, covering the eastern Shinyanga Region and the Mwanza Region. There has been much population movement in and beyond these areas, and members of both groups have also settled on the coast and elsewhere. Sukuma and members of other groups, such as the Tutsi and the Sumbwa, are often found in Nyamwezi villages, but Sukuma villages are ethnically more homogeneous. Sukuma took over the Geita area of Mwanza Region during the colonial period, and they have expanded farther west since then. They have also moved down into Nzega District and the neighboring Igunga District, and some have migrated into the southern highland areas of Tanzania, and even into Zambia. These Sukuma movements have stemmed from political factors, such as colonial cattle-culling policies, and from local overcrowding and deteriorating soil conditions. The two areas form a large and undulating tableland, most of it at elevations between 1,150 and 1,275 metres (3,773 and 4,183 ft). There are several rivers in the region, but most of them do not flow during the drier months. The year can be broadly divided into a rainy season, from about November until April, and a dry season the rest of the year. Average annual rainfall is about 75 centimetres (30 in) for most of the Sukuma area, and about 90 centimetres (35 in) for Unyamwezi, but there is much variation from year to year and from place to place. Across the region, there is a regular sequence of soil and vegetation zones. The upper levels are dry woodland typified by trees of the Brachystegia-Isoberlinia association; these areas are often called miombo country, after one of these trees. Lower areas of grass and thornbush steppe are also common, and in Sukumaland there are large tracts of park steppe interspersed with baobabs.

== Notable Sukuma ==
=== Politicians ===
- John Magufuli - Former President of Tanzania
- Luhaga Mpina - CCM
- Salome Makamba - CHADEMA
- Patrobas Katambi - CCM
- Mary Masanja - CCM
- Andrew Chenge - CCM
- Charles Kitwanga - CCM
- Paul Bomani -CCM

=== Statespeople ===
- Mark Bomani, Tanzanian Judge

=== Entertainers and artists ===
- Cool James, Tanzanian musician
- Steven Kanumba, Late Tanzanian actor

== See also ==
- Sungusungu
- Sukuma Museum
