= Geita =

Town and capital of Geita Region, Tanzania

- City of Geita Region
- Nickname: Gold Town
- Location in Tanzania
- Coordinates: 2.87273°S 32.23271°E
- Country: Tanzania
- Region: Geita Region
- District: Geita Municipal

Population (2022 census)
  - Total: 361,671
- Website: Geita Town Council website

Geita is a city and regional capital of Geita Region in northwestern Tanzania. The city is known for its gold trade. Geita, with a population of 318,006 (2022 census), is located in the centre of a gold mining area.

== History ==
In the late nineteenth century, German mineral prospecting identified the gold deposits in the region in the late nineteenth century. However, plans for large-scale gold mining was disrupted due the World War I. Tanzania, which was part of the German East Africa colony, was granted to Britain after the Treaty of Versailles.

The British developed the mine in 1934, and started a large-scale gold mine in 1936. Until its closure in 1966, the Geita mine was the largest gold mine in eastern Africa. Between 1936 and 1961, the year of Tanzania's colonial independence, artisanal mining in the region was made illegal.

Geita regained further prominence in the mid to late 1990s when the Tanzanian government opened the mineral sector to foreign investment. A number of medium to large-scale mining houses, including Ashanti and Anglo-American, conducted extensive exploration activities in the surrounding areas. The most significant outcome of those activities was the construction of the Geita Gold Mine, now owned by AngloGold Ashanti. The Geita Gold Mine is Tanzania's largest gold producer.

Gold rushes continue to occur in areas surrounding Geita, mainly in and around Rwamagasa and Matabe. These gold rushes have attracted tens of thousands of prospectors from all around the country. Being subsistence miners, their activities are highly unregulated, resulting in dangerous mining practices and considerable environmental destruction, not the least of which are increased mercury pollution and extensive deforestation.

In March 2012, it became the administrative headquarters of the newly created Geita Region.

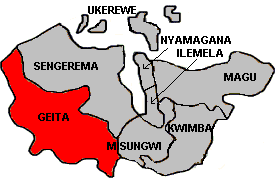
Map of Mwanza's Districts
