= Bukombe District =

- District
- Bukombe District of Geita Region.
- Coordinates: 03°28′S 031°54′E
- Country: Tanzania
- Region: Geita
- District: Bukombe

Area
  - Total: 8,055 km^{2} (3,110 sq mi)

Population (2022)
  - Total: 407,102
  - Density: 50.54/km^{2} (130.9/sq mi)
- Time zone: UTC+3 (EAT)
- Postcode: 30xxx
- Area code: 028

Bukombe District is one of the five districts in Geita Region of Tanzania. Its administrative centre is the town of Ushirombo.

Prior to March 2012, it was one of the eight districts of the Shinyanga Region.

According to the 2022 census, the population of Bukombe District was 407,102.

== Wards ==
Bukombe District is divided administratively into 15 wards:

- Bugelenga
- Bukombe
- Bulega
- Busonzo
- Butinzya
- Igulwa
- Iyogelo
- Katente
- Lyambamgongo
- Namonge
- Ng'anzo
- Runzewe Mashariki
- Runzewe Magharibi
- Ushirombo
- Uyovu
