= List of lakes of Tanzania =

Major lakes along the Great Rift Valley

Tanzania lies in the African Great Lakes region and boasts over 61,500 km^{2} (23,700 sq mi) of surface area that is covered by lakes. This makes up 6% of the national surface area and 88% of this area is covered by the three major lakes. Lake Victoria and Lake Tanganyika are part of the two great lakes in that nation, with Lake Victoria being the largest freshwater lake in Africa and Lake Tanganyika being the second-deepest lake in the world.

== List of lakes ==
The table lists information about each lake:

Name: as listed by the World Heritage Committee
Surface Area: Surface area of lake (note: several lakes change their surface area continually based on weather)
Bordering Nations: Nations whose border goes through the lake
Description: Brief description of the lake
† Disputed Lake"

Name	Image	Surface Area	Bordering Nations	Notes	Reference
Lake Victoria		68,800 km^{2} (26,600 sq mi)	Tanzania; Kenya; Uganda	Lake Victoria is the largest of the African Great Lakes and is the largest freshwater lake in Africa. The Lake is also the second-largest freshwater lake in the world and spans across three countries. The lake is the solely drained by the Nile river at Jinja.	
Lake Amboseli		189 km^{2} (73 sq mi)	Tanzania; Kenya	Lake Amboseli is a seasonal water body, fed by the Namanga River. At its maximum size, it covers 189 km^{2} (73 sq mi), with 12 km^{2} (4.6 sq mi) in Tanzania and the majority of the area (177 km^{2} (68 sq mi)) in Kenya.	
Lake Tanganyika		32,900 km^{2} (12,700 sq mi)	Tanzania; DRC; Burundi; Zambia	Lake Tanganyika is an African Great Lake and is the second-deepest lake in the world and the second-biggest lake by volume. The lake borders four nations and is vital for trade and commerce for societies living along the lake. The lake is home to the oldest-running ferry in the world, MV Liemba	
Lake Nyasa		29,600 km^{2} (11,400 sq mi)	Tanzania; Malawi; Mozambique	Tanzania has over 800 kilometres (500 mi) of coastline with the lake; however, the border with Malawi is disputed and currently the lake is not entirely part of Tanzania. The lake is also known as Lake Malawi.	
Lake Rukwa		~ 5,760 km^{2} (2,220 sq mi)	Tanzania	Lake Rukwa is an Endorheic lake in the Rukwa Valley in southwest Tanzania. The lake is an alkaline lake and lies at about 800 metres (2,600 ft) of altitude along the Great Rift Valley system.	
Lake Eyasi		1,050 km^{2} (410 sq mi)	Tanzania	Lake Eyasi is an endorheic salt lake on the floor of the Great Rift Valley. The lake has dramatic seasonal fluctuations in water and almost dries up in the dry season.	
Lake Natron		1,040 km^{2} (400 sq mi)	Tanzania	Lake Natron is a salt and soda lake. The lake is in the Arusha region near the famous Ol Doinyo Lengai. The lake is famous for its red alkaline layer and its pH fluctuates between 10.5 and 12.	
Lake Manyara		470 km^{2} (180 sq mi)	Tanzania	Lake Manyara is shallow alkaline lake in the East African Rift Valley and is partly within the 127-square-mile (330 km^{2}) Lake Manyara National Park. It forms a major part of the national park, covering about 89-square-mile (230 km^{2}) of the park in the wet season, shrinking significantly in the dry season.	
Lake Burigi		70 km^{2} (27 sq mi)	Tanzania	The lake is located in the Kagera Region of Northern Tanzania. The lake spans 18 kilometres (11 mi) long and it is so narrow that the other side is always visible from one side. Part of the lake is located along the Burigi-Chato National Park and has several wildlife living around the lake.	
Lake Balangida		33 km^{2} (13 sq mi)	Tanzania	Lake Balangida is an alkaline lake in the Natron-Manyara-Balangida branch of the East African Rift in north-central Tanzania.	
Lake Jipe		30 km^{2} (12 sq mi)	Tanzania; Kenya	Lake Jipe is in the Mwanga District in the Kilimanjaro Region on the border with Kenya. The lake is mainly in Kenya and is protected on the Kenyan side by the Tsavo West National Park and on the Tanzanian side it is near to Mkomazi National Park.	
Lake Babati		21 km^{2} (8.1 sq mi)	Tanzania	Lake Babati is located in Babati District in Arusha Region to the west of the Tarangire National Park. The lake is known for its large hippo population.	
Lake Ambussel		19 km^{2} (7.3 sq mi)	Tanzania	Lake Ambussel is one of the four water bodies in the Pangani Basin.	
Lake Chala		4.2 km^{2} (1.6 sq mi)	Tanzania; Kenya	Lake Chala is a crater lake at the edge of Mount Kilimanjaro. The lake is surrounded by a 100-kilometre (62 mi) crater rim and is home to the endangered Lake Chala tilapia. The lake once had Nile crocodiles; however, they were considered a nuisance to the local population and have been entirely wiped out over the years.	

== See also ==
- Geography of Tanzania
- Tanzania Ports Authority
- Marine Services Company
