= List of ambassadors of Tanzania to the Nordic Countries, Baltic States and Ukraine =

The Tanzanian Embassy in Stockholm was established in 1964.

== Embassy locations ==
The first Embassy was at Narvavägen 7 before moving to Sandhamnsgatan 40. It was at Oxtorgsgatan 24 (Regeringsgatan 67) from June 1974 to December 2001 and from 2001 to 2006 the Embassy was at Wallingatan 11. Since then, the Embassy is located at Näsby Alle 6 near Näsby Park in Täby.

== Ambassadors ==
- Dr. Willibrod Slaa 2017-2021
- Dora Mmari Msechu 2014-2017
- Muhammed Mwinyi Mzale 2010-2014
- Dr. Ben Moses 2005-2008
- James L. Kateka 1998-2005
- Wilson K. Tibaijuka 1994-1998
- Mohamed Ramia Abdiwawa 1990-1994
- Daniel N. Mloka 1983-1989
- J.F. Edward Mhina 1977-1983
- Chief Michael Lukumbuzya 1969-1977
- Philemon Muro 1964-1969
