= Chato, Tanzania =

Chato
- town
- Nickname(s): Magufuli Baytown, The home of Burigi-Chato National Park and Rubondo Island National Park, Seattle of Africa.
- Interactive map of Chato
- Location of Chato Chato (Africa) Chato (Earth)
- Coordinates: 02°38′16″S 031°46′01″E
- Country: Tanzania
- Region: Geita
- District: Chato
- Elevation: 1,157 m (3,796 ft)

Population (2016)
  - Total: 27,776
- Time zone: UTC+3 (GMT)
- Postal code: 30301
- Area code: 028
- UFI: -2561820
- Climate: Aw
- Website: District website

Chato is a town in the Geita Region of northwestern Tanzania, and a port on the southern end of Lake Victoria. It is the administrative centre for Chato District. The port is located at the south western shore of Lake Victoria in Nyamirembe, 18 kilometres from the town of Chato, serving as alternative access to nearby attractions like Rubondo Island and Burigi Chato National parks. The port acts as a strategic cargo transit route moving toward Rwanda, the eastern part of Democratic Republic of Congo and Burundi.

Chato District is experiencing rapid population growth in Tanzania, according to Chato District Council Population Projection Report the population is projected to grow from 682,381 people in 2026 to 1,350,151 people by 2050.

Chato is the home of Geita Airport, serving Chato and Geita region in Tanzania, providing regional connectivity by scheduled domestic flights via Air Tanzania linking the area with the cities of Dar es Salaam and Mwanza. The airport is located near the south western shores of Lake Victoria, approximately 14 kilometres from the town of Chato. Chato has been designated by the government of Tanzania as a primary tourism hub.

Chato has emerged as a major regional medical and healthcare hub in the lake zone of Tanzania, anchored by major tertiary healthcare infrastructures, government investments and specialized health education institutions. The Medical Store Department (MSD) has constructed a 4800 square metre medical warehouse in Chato town, which is designated to strengthen the supply and storage of healthcare commodities, medical supplies and medicine across Geita, Kagera, Shinyanga and Kigoma regions within the lake zone including support for the Chato Zonal Referral Hospital (CZRH).

== History ==
Chato was originally within the Biharamulo District of the Kagera Region. In 2005 the Chato District, with the town of Chato, became a separate district. In 2012 Chato District was made part of the Geita Region.

Former President John Magufuli (2015-2021) was born in Chato on 29 October 1959, and was buried there in March 2021.

== Economy ==
Fishing and fish processing are the major economic activities in Chato, formerly followed by the ginning of cotton which ceased in 1998. The Tanzanian government had plans to expand the port and undertook to build a Chato airport, as well as a new rail line to connect Chato with the country's standard gauge railway system. Chato is not a major Tanzanian port on the lake, and the ports of Mwanza South, Kemondo Bay and Musoma already have rail links. Chato has various fish, livestock, and agriculture markets which help to boost the economy of the town and region. Chato economy is transitioning into a major regional healthcare and tourism hub.

== Tourism and recreation ==
Chato town sit on the Bay area, Bwina Peninsula, Emin pasha Gulf area and is near the Island of Rubondo on the lakeshore of lake victoria, Is best known for its beautiful parks, lakefront resorts, beaches, and panoramic view of rolling hills surrounding the town. It is a tourism epicenter of the lake zone regions and a gateway to Burigi Chato National Park and Rubondo Island National Park.

== Healthcare ==
Chato is the home of Chato Zonal Referral Hospital (CZRH), a major government owned tertiary hospital and medical hub in Tanzania's lake zone offering specialized medical referral services and Medical tourism for International and local patients, It serve as referral center for Geita, Kagera, Shinyanga and Kigoma regions, reducing the need to travel long distance to distant national hospitals.

== Education ==
Chato has high education colleges and universities serving the Chato and Geita Region, like the Institute of Finance Management (IFM). It has a Vocational Training Institute (VETA) and several medical training Institutions such as Chato College of Health and allied Sciences (Chato CoHAS), Chato Institute of Health and Allied Sciences (CIHAS), and the Mayday Institute of Health Sciences and Technology.

The government of Tanzania had a plan to build a campus of the University of Dar es Salaam, a college of fisheries and aquatic sciences associated with school of marine sciences at Kasagara bay area in Chato town. Also the Tanzania Public Service College (TPSC) acquired 41.66 acres of lakefront land at Rubambangwe to build a Campus at Chato to serve the lake zone regions of Kagera, Geita, Mwanza, Mara, Simiyu and Shinyanga.

Chato town has numerous high schools and special schools like the Chato Technical and high school, Muungano Boys high school, Magufuli High school, Janeth Magufuli Girls High school, Jikomboe Girls high school, Zakia Meghji high school, Bwina high school, Ilemela high school, and many others.

Chato has several public and private English medium pre and primary Schools such as the Museveni Pre and Primary school, Paradise Pre and Primary school, Emau Schools, Edan Pre and Primary School, St. Stephano pre and primary school, Nuru's pre and primary school, New Jerusalem pre and primary school and many others.

== Transportation ==
Chato town hosts the largest Airport in the region, located 14 kilometres from the town of Chato. The town has a port (Nyamirembe port) which links with East African countries such as Rwanda, Burundi, Kenya via Kisumu, Uganda, and the eastern part of the Democratic Republic of Congo. The port connects Chato with major cities like Mwanza, Bukoba and Musoma. The southern part of Chato Paved Highway Road T4 connect Chato with neighbour cities of Mwanza, Geita, and Bukoba.

== Utilities ==
The main utility provider for water and sanitation management in the town of Chato is the Chato Water Supply and Sanitation Authority (CHAWASSA) which operates under the Water and Sanitation Act, covering services in areas of Chato town and periurban areas. The government of Tanzania is undergoing the major Water project (28 Town water project) at Buzirayombo the outskirt of Chato town to improve piped water access across Chato town wards.Also the government has done investments of Wastewater and treatment project at Nyan'homango area to manage public and private sanitation and sewage disposal services in Chato town.

Chato is connected to national grid electricity through Nyakanazi substation, TANESCO, the Tanzania grid power generator and supplier of electricity provides sufficient transmission and distribution of electricity in the town of Chato.

The government of Tanzania has included Chato town in the Tanzania Cities Transformating Infrastructure and Competitiveness (TACTIC) project funded by World Bank to improve local urban infrastructure, economic clusters, transportation services delivery across a town, it is categorised under Tier 3 of the 45 participating Local Government Authourities (LGAs) in the national wide urban development initiative, the plan has included several projects such as a Masterplan of a town, a morden market at Muungano junction, expanding the town network of turmac roads and expanding Kasenda International fish market.

== See also ==
- Burigi Chato National Park
- Rubondo Island National Park
- Chato District
- Tanzania Ports Authority#Ports of Lake Victoria
