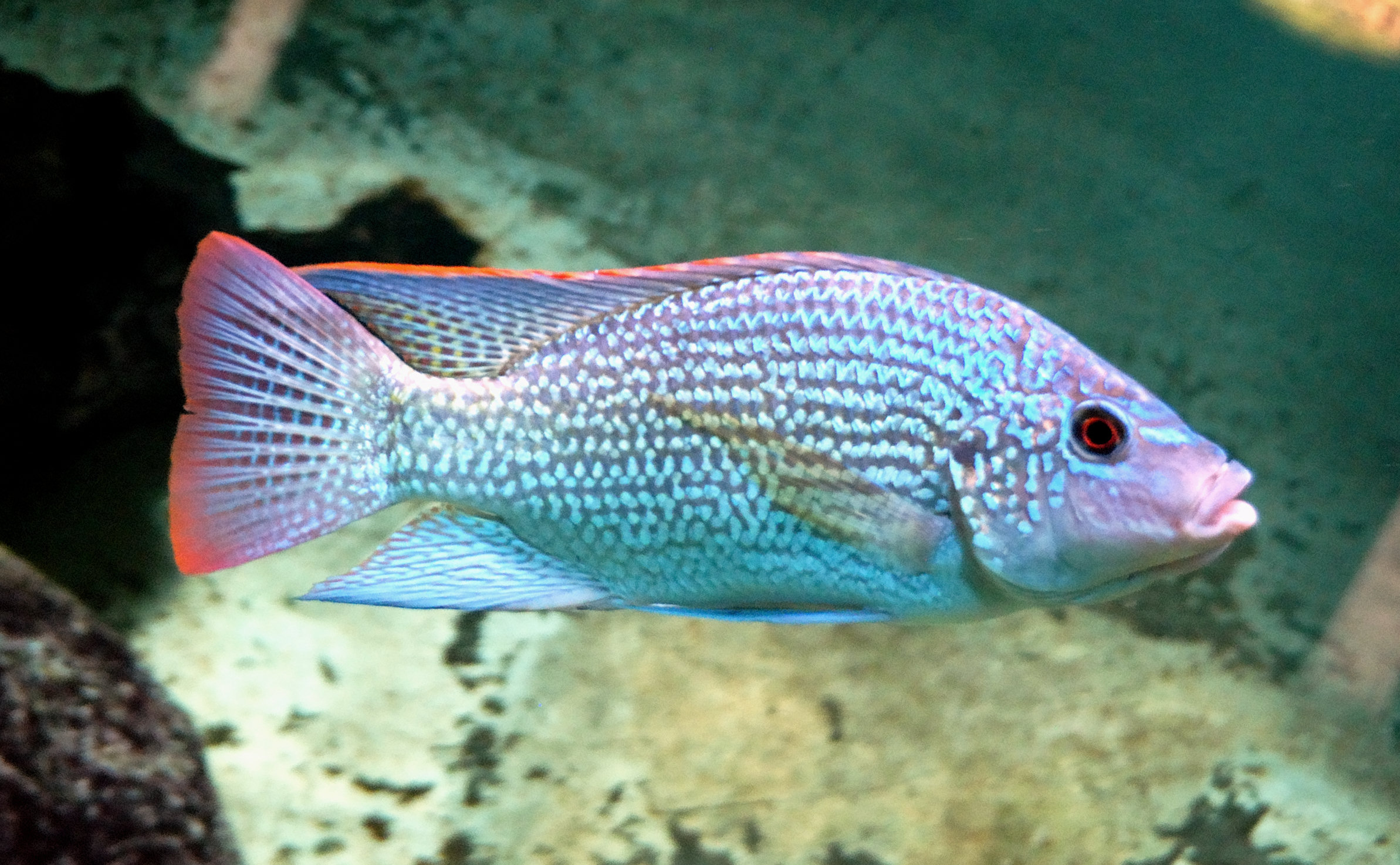
- O. tanganicae

Scientific classification
- Kingdom: Animalia
- Phylum: Chordata
- Class: Actinopterygii
- Order: Cichliformes
- Family: Cichlidae
- Tribe: Oreochromini
- Genus: Oreochromis; Günther, 1889

Type species
- Oreochromis hunteri Günther, 1889

= Oreochromis =

Oreochromis Temporal range: Late Miocene to present

Genus of fishes

Oreochromis is a large genus of oreochromine cichlids, fishes endemic to Africa and the Middle East. A few species from this genus have been introduced far outside their native range and are important in aquaculture. Many others have very small ranges; some are seriously threatened, and O. ismailiaensis and O. lidole possibly are extinct. Although Oreochromis primarily are freshwater fish of rivers, lakes and similar habitats, several species can also thrive in brackish waters and some even survive in hypersaline conditions with a salinity that far surpasses that of seawater. In addition to overfishing and habitat loss, some of the more localized species are threatened by the introduction of other, more widespread Oreochromis species into their ranges. This is because they—in addition to competing for the local resources—often are able to hybridize.

Oreochromis are fairly robust fish, and medium–small to very large cichlids that can reach up to 9.4–61 cm (4–24 in) in total length depending on the exact species.

The earliest known member of this group is Oreochromis lorenzoi Carnevale, Sorbini & Landini, 2003 from the latest Miocene (Messinian) of Italy, suggesting that this genus naturally ranged as far north as southern Europe in prehistoric times.

== Taxonomy ==
Species in this genus, as well as those in several other oreochromine and tilapiine genera, share the common name "tilapia" and historically most were included in the genus Tilapia.

Oreochromis contains more than 30 species, and several undescribed forms exist. Judging from mtDNA sequence analysis, several clades seem to exist. Research is hampered because hybridization runs rampant in these fishes, which confounds mtDNA data (Wami tilapia is an example), and the fast speed of evolution makes choice of appropriate nuclear DNA sequences difficult. A comprehensive genetic study that included almost all the species, as well as the closely related Alcolapia, found that Oreochromis as currently defined is paraphyletic. For example, two Oreochromis species (O. amphimelas and O. esculentus) appear closer to Alcolapia than the remaining Oreochromis, and five other Oreochromis species (O. angolensis, O. lepidurus, O. niloticus, O. schwebischi and O. upembae) appear to be as distant from the "core" Oreochromis as they are from Alcolapia. A potential solution is to merge Alcolapia into Oreochromis, as done by Catalog of Fishes.

=== Species ===
The 37 recognized species in this genus are:

- Oreochromis alcalica (Hilgendorf, 1905) (common Natron tilapia)
- Oreochromis amphimelas (Hilgendorf, 1905)
- Oreochromis andersonii (Castelnau, 1861) (three-spotted tilapia)
- Oreochromis angolensis (Trewavas, 1973)
- Oreochromis aureus (Steindachner, 1864) (blue tilapia)
- Oreochromis chungruruensis (C. G. E. Ahl, 1924)
- Oreochromis esculentus (M. Graham, 1928) (Singida tilapia)

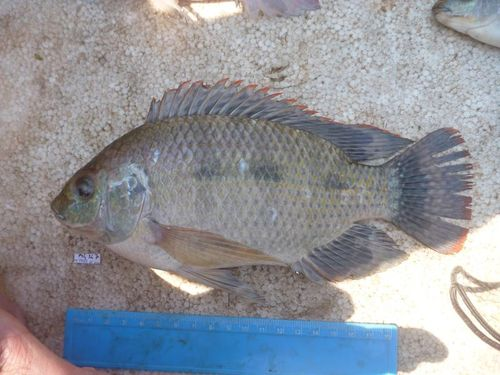
O. malagarasi

- Oreochromis grahami (Boulenger, 1912) (Magadi tilapia)
- Oreochromis hunteri Günther, 1889 (Lake Chala tilapia)
- Oreochromis ismailiaensis Mekkawy, 1995
- Oreochromis jipe (R. H. Lowe, 1955) (Jipe tilapia)
- Oreochromis karomo (Poll, 1948) (karomo)
- Oreochromis karongae (Trewavas, 1941)
- Oreochromis korogwe (R. H. Lowe, 1955) (Korogwe tilapia)

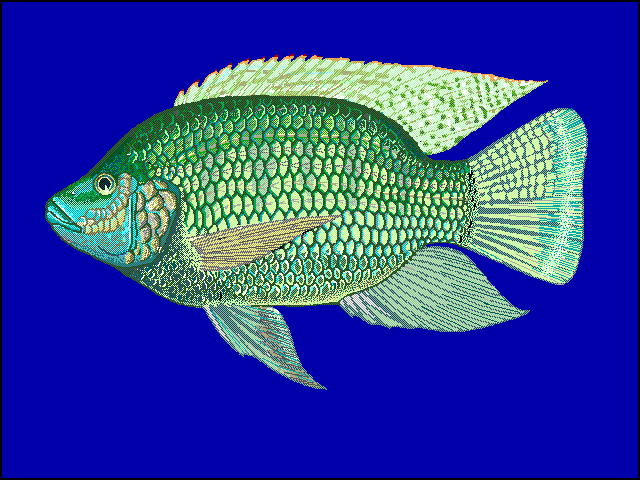
O. placidus

- Oreochromis latilabris (Seegers & Tichy, 1999) (wide-lipped Natron tilapia)
- Oreochromis lepidurus (Boulenger, 1899)
- Oreochromis leucostictus (Trewavas, 1933)
- Oreochromis lidole (Trewavas, 1941)
- †Orechromis lorenzoi Carnevale, Sorbini & Landini, 2003 (fossil; Miocene of Italy)
- Oreochromis macrochir (Boulenger, 1912) (longfin tilapia)
- Oreochromis malagarasi Trewavas, 1983 (Malagarasi tilapia)
- Oreochromis mortimeri (Trewavas, 1966) (Kariba tilapia)

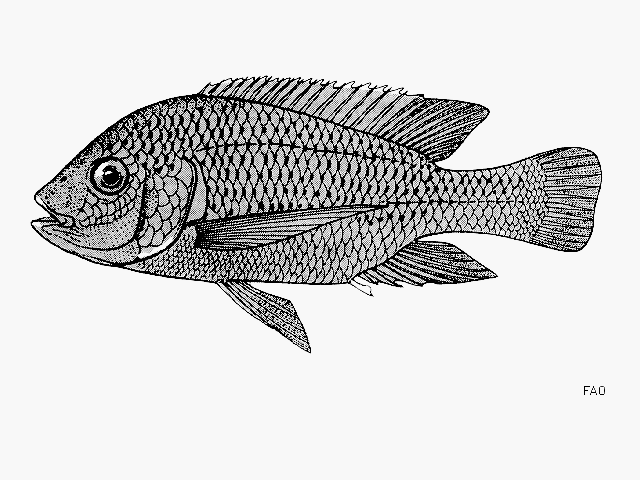
O. saka

- Oreochromis mossambicus (W. K. H. Peters, 1852) (Mozambique tilapia)
- Oreochromis mweruensis Trewavas, 1983
- Oreochromis ndalalani (Seegers & Tichy, 1999) (narrow-mouthed Natron tilapia)
- Oreochromis niloticus (Linnaeus, 1758) (Nile tilapia)
- Oreochromis placidus (Trewavas, 1941)
  - Oreochromis placidus placidus (Trewavas, 1941) (black tilapia)
  - Oreochromis placidus ruvumae (Trewavas, 1966)

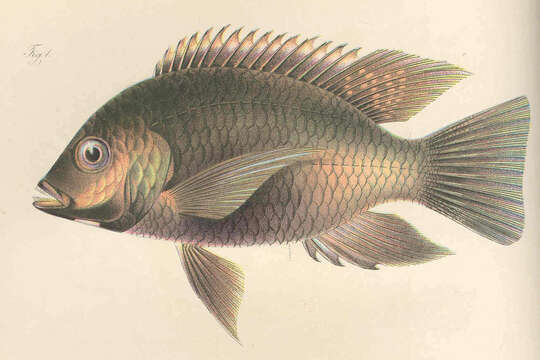
O. schwebischi

- Oreochromis rukwaensis (Hilgendorf & Pappenheim, 1903) (Lake Rukwa tilapia)
- Oreochromis saka (R. H. Lowe, 1953)
- Oreochromis salinicola (Poll, 1948)
- Oreochromis schwebischi (Sauvage, 1884)
- Oreochromis shiranus Boulenger, 1897

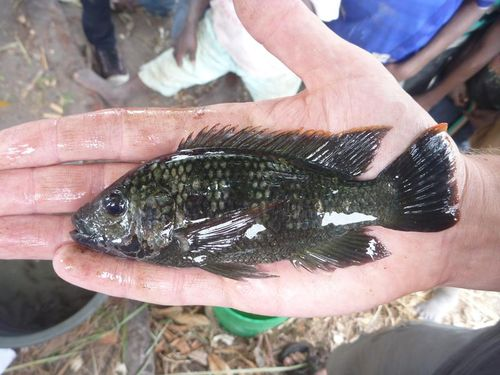
O. shiranus

  - Oreochromis shiranus chilwae (Trewavas, 1966) (Chilwa tilapia)
  - Oreochromis shiranus shiranus Boulenger, 1897
- Oreochromis spilurus (Günther, 1894)
  - Oreochromis spilurus niger (Günther, 1894) (Athi River tilapia)
  - Oreochromis spilurus percivali (Boulenger, 1912) (Buffalo Springs tilapia)
  - Oreochromis spilurus spilurus (Günther, 1894) (Sabaki tilapia)
- Oreochromis squamipinnis (Günther, 1864)
- Oreochromis tanganicae (Günther, 1894)
- Oreochromis upembae (Thys van den Audenaerde, 1964)
- Oreochromis urolepis (Norman, 1922)
  - Oreochromis urolepis hornorum (Trewavas, 1966) (Wami tilapia)
  - Oreochromis urolepis urolepis (Norman, 1922) (Rufigi tilapia)
- Oreochromis variabilis (Boulenger, 1906) (Victoria tilapia)

== Gallery ==
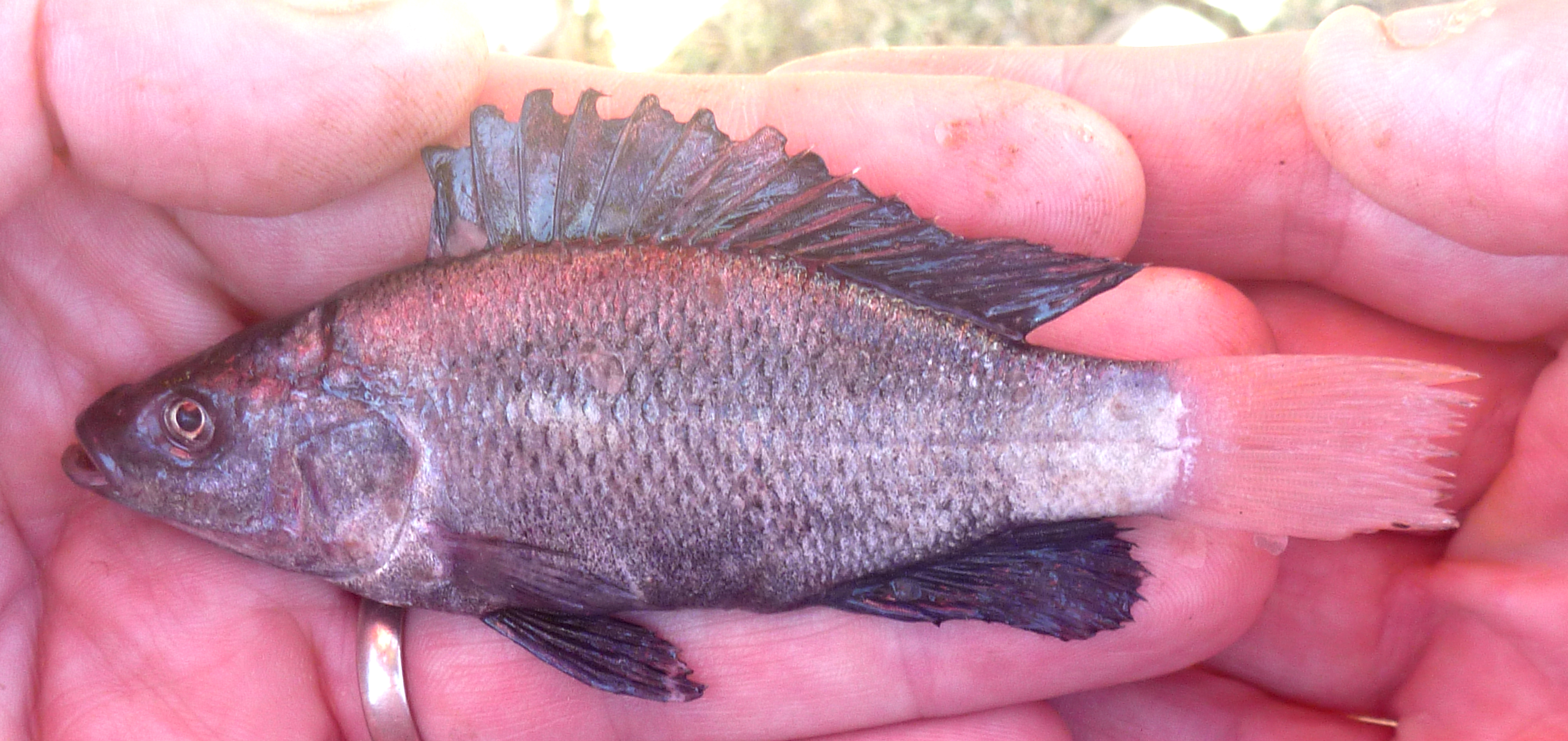
Oreochromis amphimelas of lakes, often saline, in north–central Tanzania

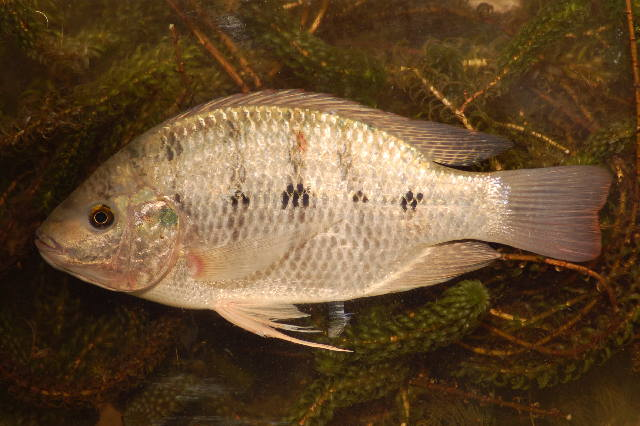
Oreochromis andersonii, a threatened species of south–central Africa

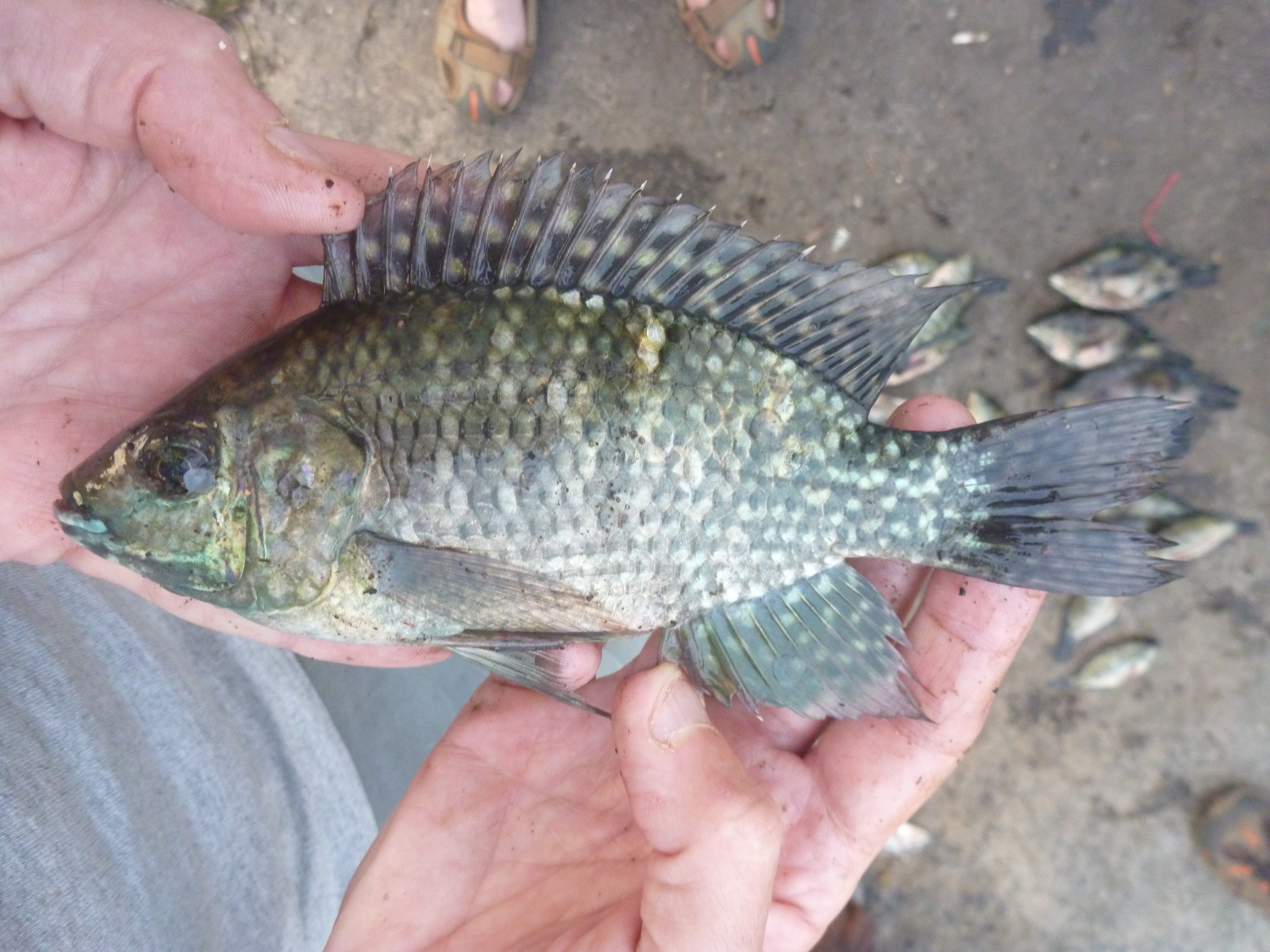
Oreochromis leucostictus of Albertine Rift Valley lakes and introduced elsewhere

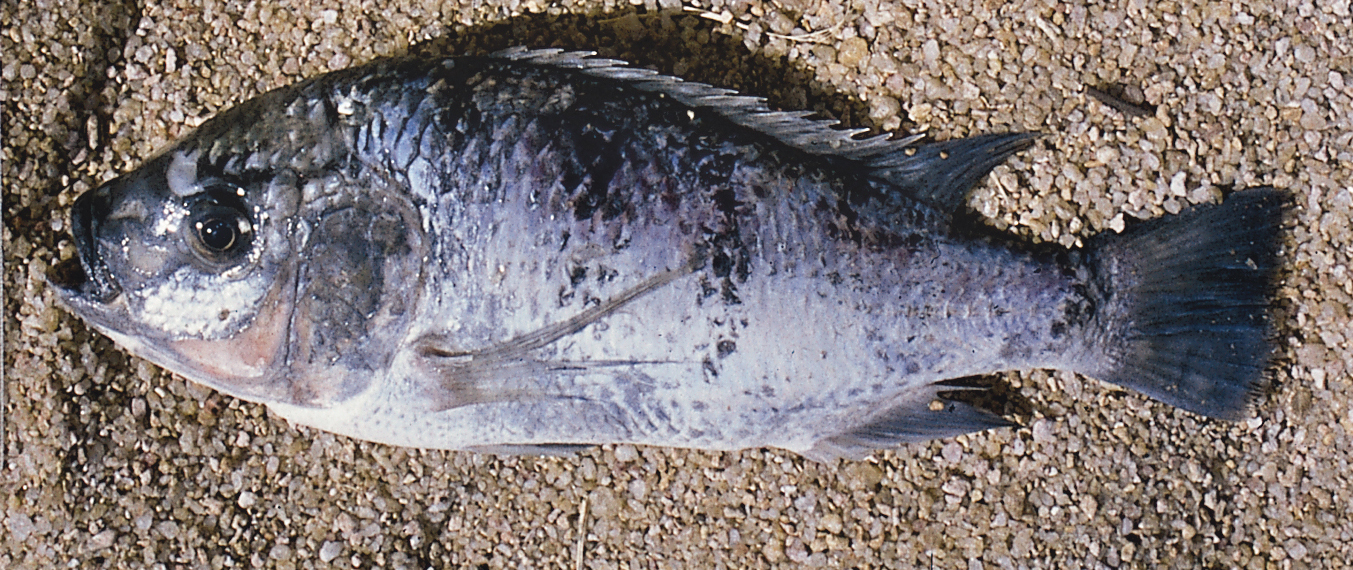
Oreochromis lidole, a possibly extinct species of the Lake Malawi basin

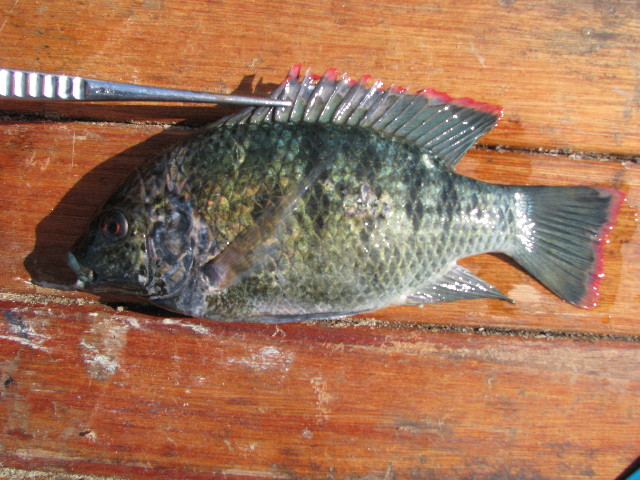
Oreochromis macrochir, a threatened species of south–central Africa

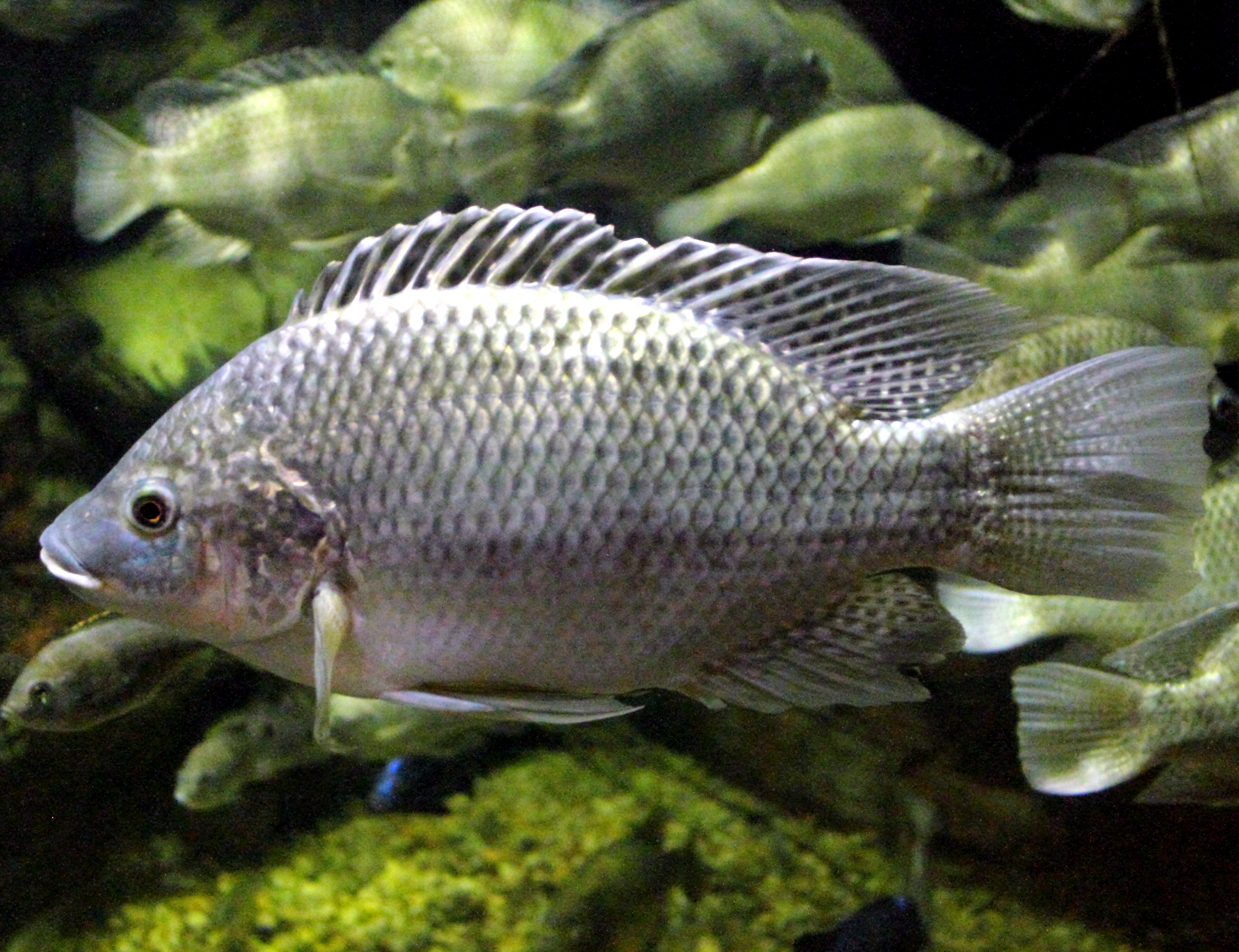
Oreochromis mossambicus, a widespread species that also is introduced outside its native range

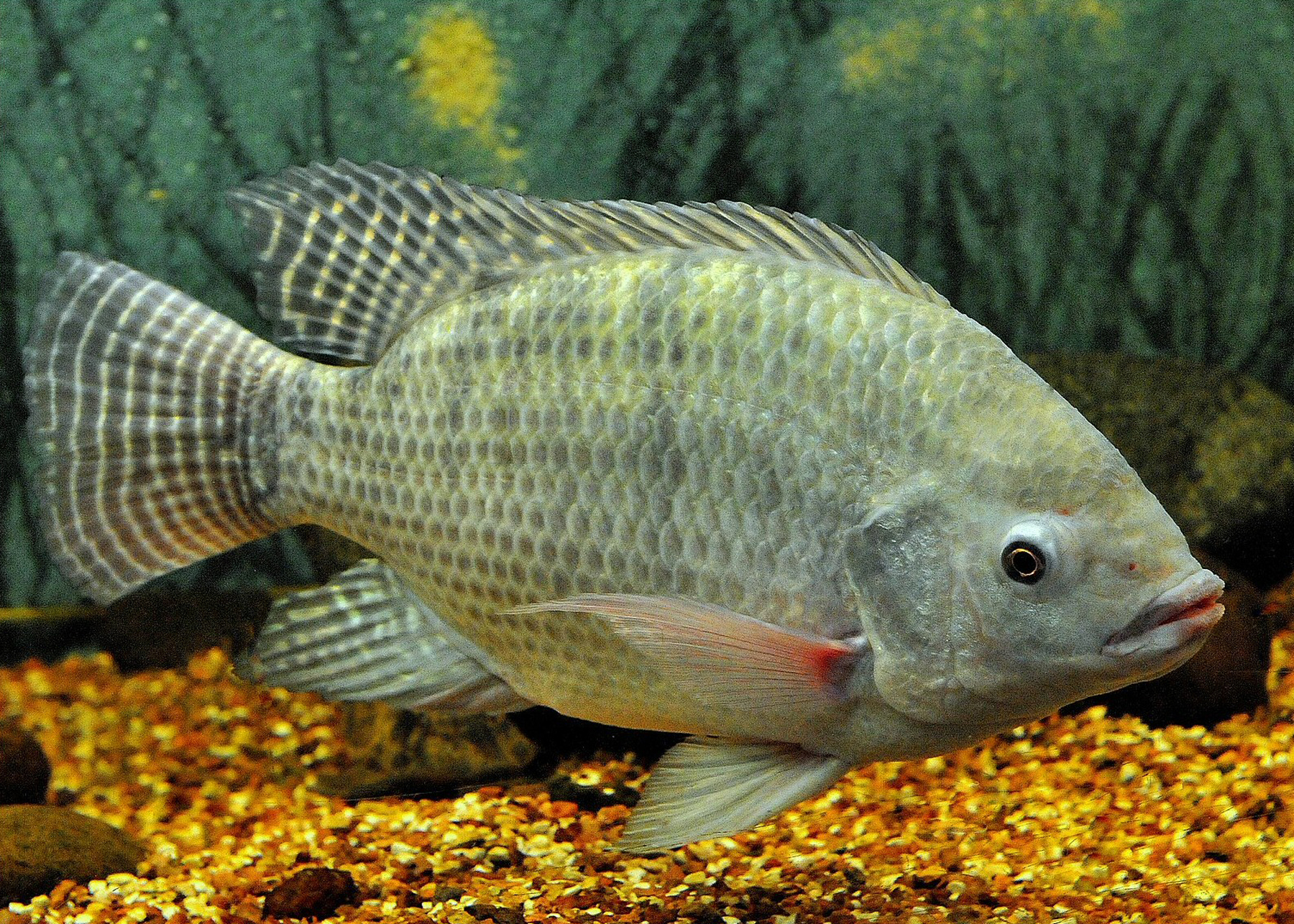
Oreochromis niloticus, a very widespread species that also is introduced outside its native range

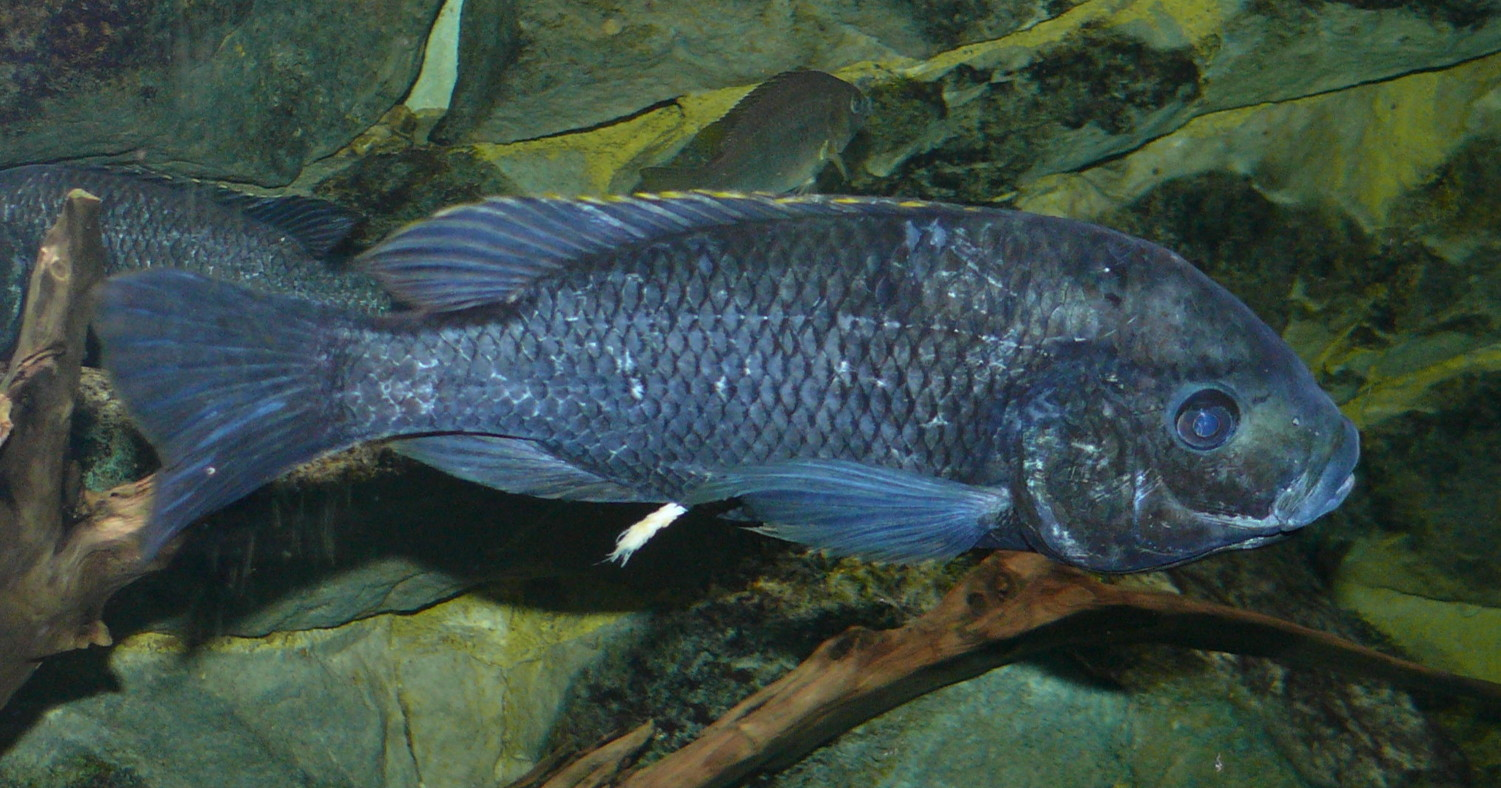
Oreochromis squamipinnis, a threatened species of the Lake Malawi basin

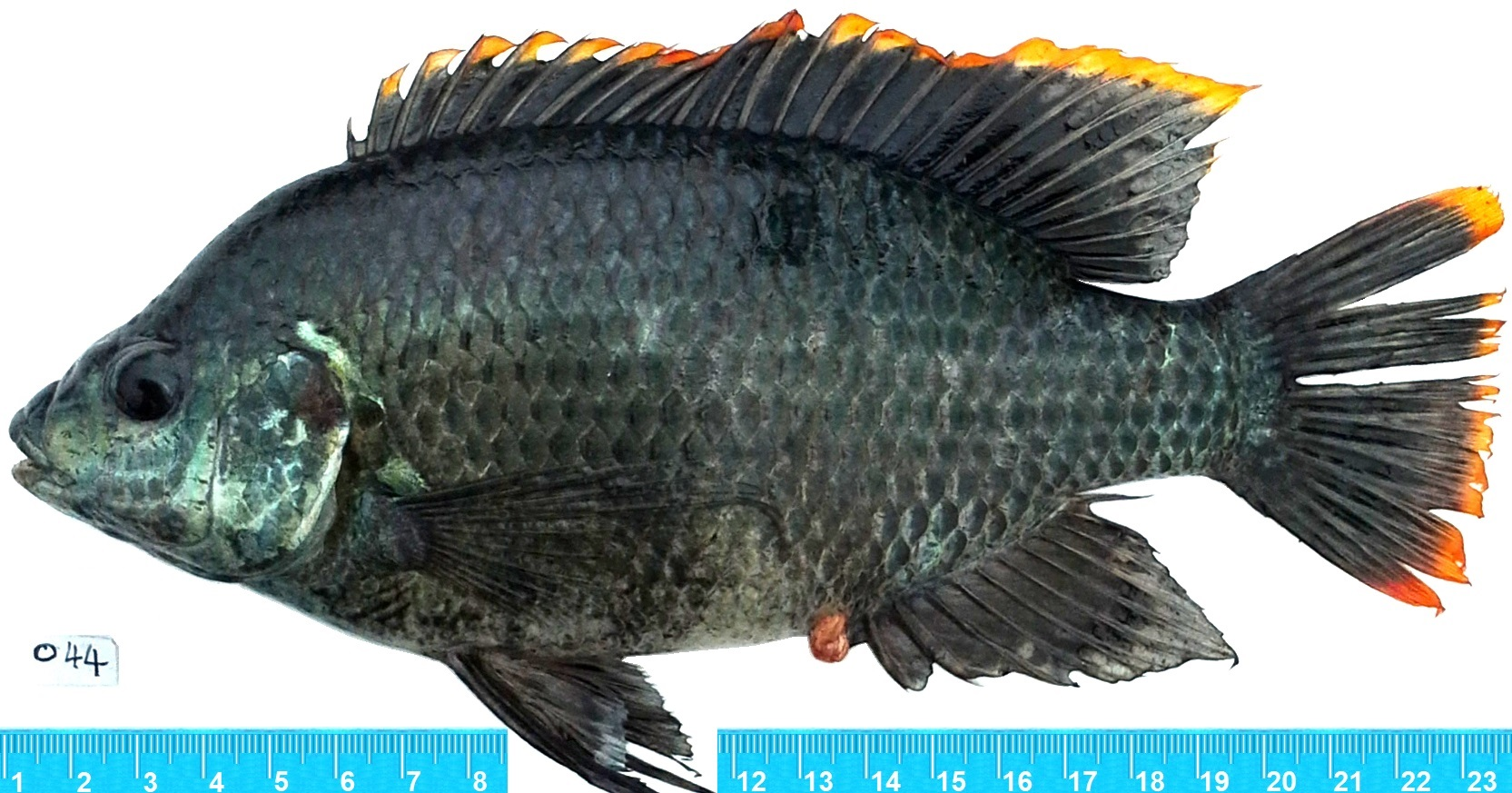
Oreochromis variabilis, a threatened species of the Lake Victoria basin

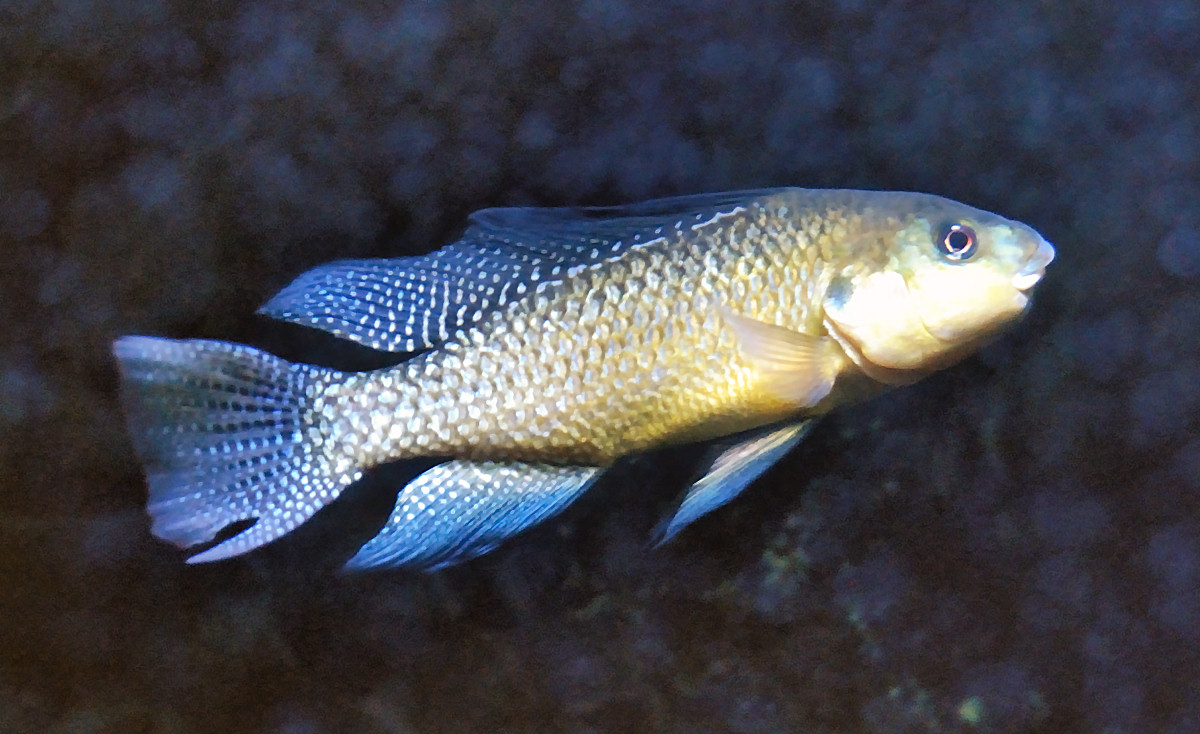
Oreochromis alcalica, formerly allocated to Alcolapia

Media related to Oreochromis at Wikimedia Commons
