= Oreochromis korogwe =

Korogwe tilapia

Conservation status
- Least Concern (IUCN 3.1)

Scientific classification
- Kingdom: Animalia
- Phylum: Chordata
- Class: Actinopterygii
- Order: Cichliformes
- Family: Cichlidae
- Genus: Oreochromis
- Species: O. korogwe

Binomial name
- Oreochromis korogwe (R. H. Lowe, 1955)

Synonyms
- Tilapia mossambica korogwe R. H. Lowe, 1955; Sarotherodon korogwe (R. H. Lowe, 1955); Tilapia korogwe (R. H. Lowe, 1955)

Species of fish

Oreochromis korogwe (Korogwe tilapia) is a species of cichlid native to Kenya and Tanzania, where it occurs in the Pangani River system, as well as the Zigi River. This species can reach a standard length of 20.8 cm (8.2 in).

Disjunct populations of O. korogwe in Lake Nambawala, Lake Rutamba and Lake Mitupa were identified in southeast Tanzania between 2013 and 2016.
