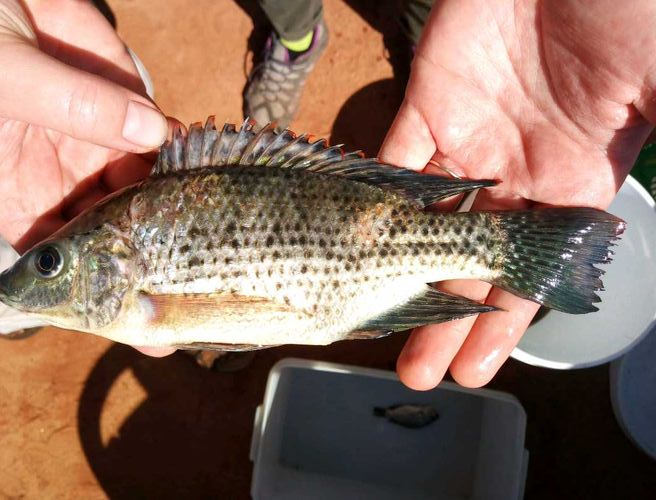

Conservation status
- Critically Endangered (IUCN 3.1)

Scientific classification
- Kingdom: Animalia
- Phylum: Chordata
- Class: Actinopterygii
- Order: Cichliformes
- Family: Cichlidae
- Genus: Oreochromis
- Species: O. jipe

Binomial name
- Oreochromis jipe (R. H. Lowe, 1955)

Synonyms
- Tilapia jipe R. H. Lowe, 1955; Sarotherodon jipe (R. H. Lowe, 1955); Tilapia girigan R. H. Lowe, 1955; Oreochromis pangani girigan (R. H. Lowe, 1955); Sarotherodon girigan (R. H. Lowe, 1955); Tilapia pangani R. H. Lowe, 1955; Oreochromis pangani (R. H. Lowe, 1955); Oreochromis pangani pangani (R. H. Lowe, 1955); Sarotherodon pangani (R. H. Lowe, 1955)

= Oreochromis jipe =

Species of fish

Oreochromis jipe, the Jipe tilapia, is a critically endangered species of cichlid fish native to Kenya and Tanzania, where it is restricted to Lake Jipe and the Pangani River. The population in the Pangani River (including Ruva River) shows some morphological differences compared to the population in Lake Jipe, and it is sometimes recognized as a separate species, the Pangani tilapia (O. pangani). Whether regarded as one or two species, the Jipe–Pangani tilapia forms a species flock with the threatened Lake Chala tilapia from the same general region of Kenya and Tanzania.

This Pangani tilapia can reach a standard length of up to 50 cm (20 in). This species is important to local commercial fisheries.
