= Brenda Msangi =

Tanzanian health executive (born 1980)

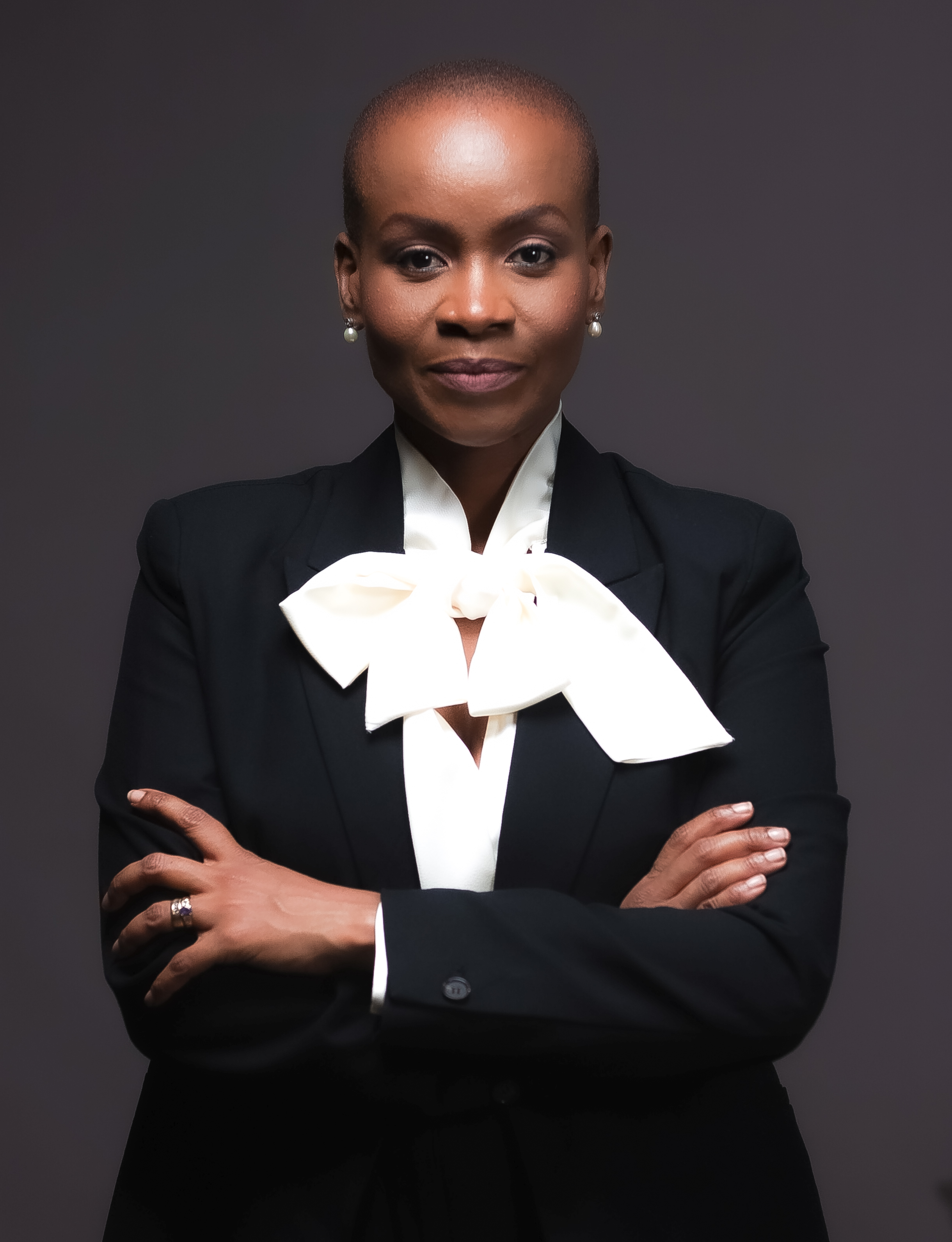
- Born: Brenda Msangi; 3 January 1980 (age 46); Tanzania
- Education: University of Brighton, University of Plymouth, Harvard Business School
- Occupation: CEO at CCBRT-Tanzania
- Title: Chief Executive Officer
- Website: newsite.ccbrt.org

Brenda Msangi (born 3 January 1980) is a Chief Executive Officer at Comprehensive Community Based Rehabilitation Tanzania (CCBRT) based in Dar es Salaam, Tanzania.She is also a healthcare leader, sustainable development advocate, and a businesswoman. She is known for her extensive work in the healthcare sector and her efforts to empower vulnerable communities in Tanzania.

== Early life and education ==
Msangi was born and raised in Dar es Salaam, Tanzania. She obtained her primary education at Oysterbay Primary School, and was later selected to join Jangwani Girls Secondary School for Ordinary and Advanced education. She earned a Master of Pharmacy from the University of Brighton and a Master of Business Administration in Healthcare from the University of Plymouth. She is a certified board governance professional from Harvard Business School.

== Career ==
Msangi is the CEO of CCBRT, one of the largest healthcare organizations in Tanzania and has over seventeen years experience as a healthcare professional. Msangi also serves as the National Senior Health Compliance Advisor for International SOS and the Chairperson of the CEO Apprenticeship Program (CAP). She was appointed CEO of CCBRT in December 2018. She has raised awareness of the slow processing of health insurance claims in Tanzania, and of the disproportionate impact of fistula on under-educated women. In August 2019 she spoke on obstetric fistula at TEDxOysterbay.

Msangi is a renowned sustainable economic growth and socio-economic development champion. She serves on the boards of the CEO Roundtable of Tanzania, the Medical Stores Department (MSD), the Association of Tanzania Employers (ATE), and World Vision Tanzania. Msangi is a panelist and keynote speaker at various conferences and symposiums. Her commitment is around creating opportunities for the next generation of leaders, equipping them with the skills and knowledge needed to make a difference.

== Initiatives ==
She is the Founder of Dear Girl Child BMK, an online mentorship platform that help current and upcoming corporate young leaders, empowering young girls and men to build a resilience and positive mindset. She also launched initiatives to help disabled Tanzanians get jobs.

== Awards ==
Msangi has received numerous awards for her leadership and advocacy work, including

1. Most Inspiring Female Corporate Leader in Africa
2. Outstanding CEO by Pan-African Women Economic Summit
3. Most Inspiring Female Corporate Leader in Tanzania by Consumer Choice Awards Africa
