= Lake Ambussel =

Lake in Tanzania

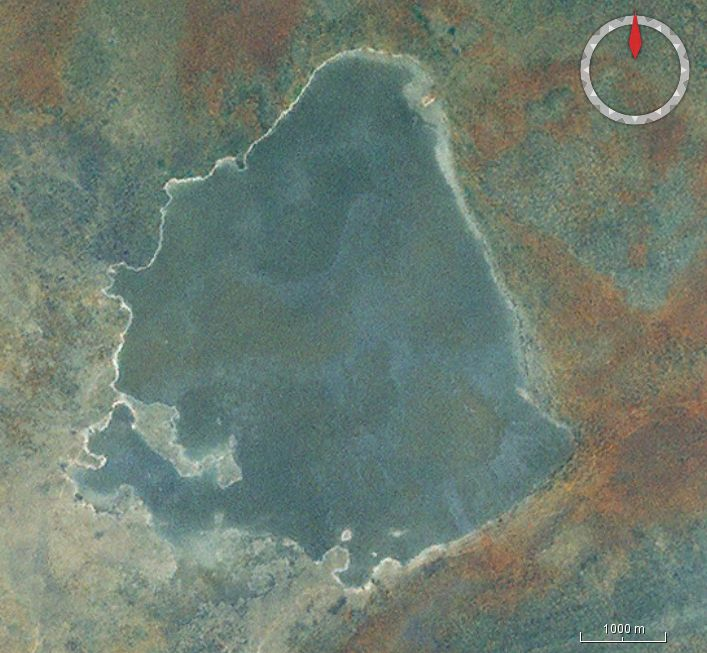
- Lake Ambussel

- Location within Tanzania
- Location: Lossogonoi Plateau in Tanzania
- Coordinates: 3.933°S 37.266°E
- Type: lake
- Max. length: 6 kilometres (3.7 mi)
- Max. width: 4.5 kilometres (2.8 mi)
- Surface area: 19 square kilometres (7.3 sq mi)

Lake Ambussel (Swahili: Ziwa Ambussel) is a lake on the Lossogonoi Plateau in Tanzania. Along with Nyumba ya Mungu Reservoir, Lake Chala and Lake Jipe, it is one of four waterbodies in the Pangani basin. It covers an area of about 19 km^{2} (7.3 sq mi), spanning 6 by 4.5 km (3.7 by 2.8 mi).
