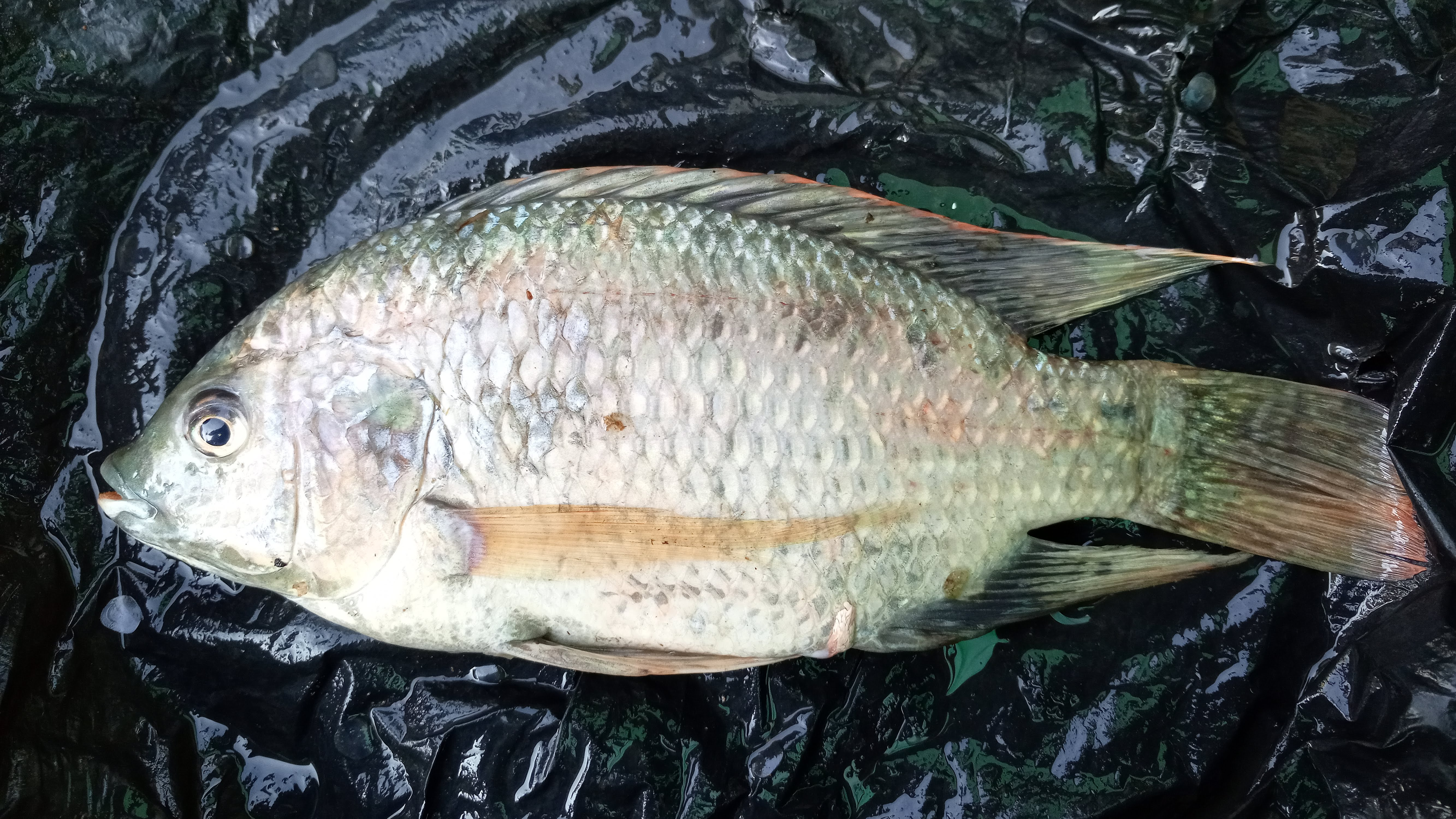

Conservation status
- Least Concern (IUCN 3.1)

Scientific classification
- Kingdom: Animalia
- Phylum: Chordata
- Class: Actinopterygii
- Order: Cichliformes
- Family: Cichlidae
- Genus: Oreochromis
- Species: O. mweruensis

Binomial name
- Oreochromis mweruensis Trewavas, 1983

Synonyms
- Oreochromis macrochir mweruensis Trewavas, 1983

= Oreochromis mweruensis =

Species of fish

Oreochromis mweruensis is a species of swamp-dwelling cichlid native to the Democratic Republic of the Congo, Rwanda and Zambia. This species can reach a length of 23.8 centimetres (9.4 in) SL. This species may have potential as a farmed fish.
