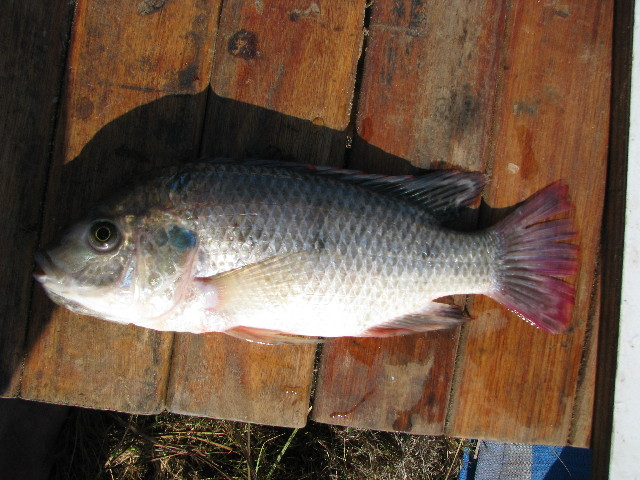

Conservation status
- Vulnerable (IUCN 3.1)

Scientific classification
- Kingdom: Animalia
- Phylum: Chordata
- Class: Actinopterygii
- Division: Teleostei
- Order: Cichliformes
- Family: Cichlidae
- Genus: Oreochromis
- Species: O. andersonii

Binomial name
- Oreochromis andersonii (Castelnau, 1861)

Synonyms
- Chromys andersonii Castelnau, 1861; Sarotherodon andersonii (Castelnau, 1861); Tilapia andersonii (Castelnau, 1861); Tilapia kafuensis Boulenger, 1912

= Oreochromis andersonii =

Species of fish

Oreochromis andersonii, the three-spotted tilapia, threespot tilapia, or threespot bream, is a species of cichlid native to Africa, where it is found in rivers and swamps in the southern half of the continent. This species reaches a length of 61 cm (24 in). It is important to local commercial fisheries, as well as being commercially farmed. It is also popular as a gamefish. The identity of the person honoured in the specific name of this fish is not known but it is thought most likely to be the Swedish explorer and hunter Charles John Andersson (1827-1867) who explored much of Namibia where the type was collected.
