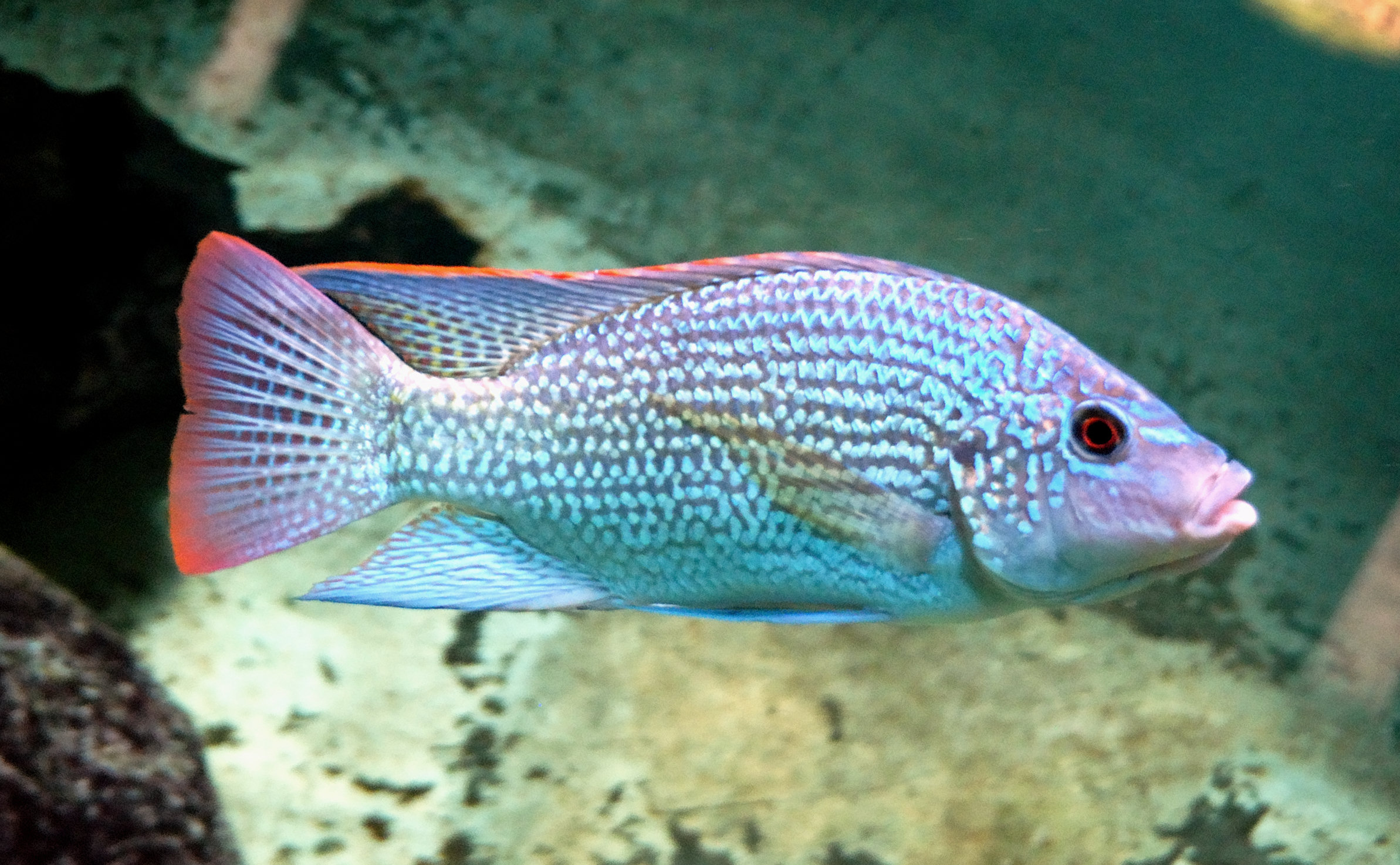

Conservation status
- Least Concern (IUCN 3.1)

Scientific classification
- Kingdom: Animalia
- Phylum: Chordata
- Class: Actinopterygii
- Order: Cichliformes
- Family: Cichlidae
- Genus: Oreochromis
- Species: O. tanganicae

Binomial name
- Oreochromis tanganicae (Günther, 1894)

Synonyms
- Chromis tanganicae Günther, 1894; Neotilapia tanganicae (Günther, 1894); Petrochromis tanganicae (Günther, 1894); Sarotherodon tanganicae (Günther, 1894); Tilapia tanganicae (Günther, 1894); Petrochromis andersonii Boulenger, 1901; Neotilapia andersonii (Boulenger, 1901)

= Oreochromis tanganicae =

Species of fish

Oreochromis tanganicae, the Tanganyika tilapia, is a species of cichlid endemic to Lake Tanganyika and the mouths of its larger affluent rivers. This species can reach a length of 42 centimetres (17 in) SL. Males are larger and more colorful than females and possess longer dorsal and anal fins when fully grown. In the wild, the species is primarily herbivorous.
