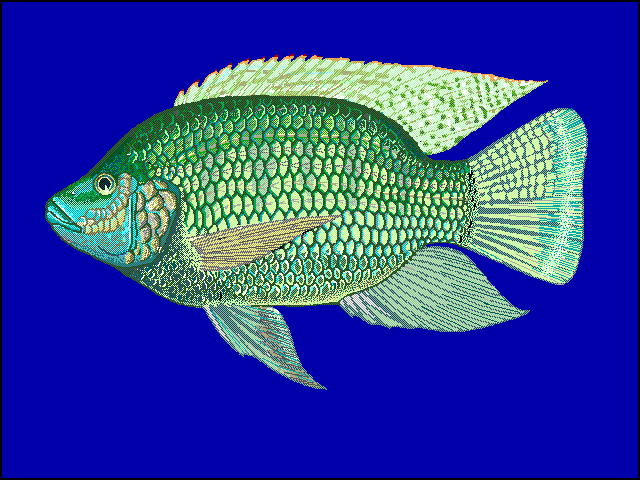

Conservation status
- Least Concern (IUCN 3.1)

Scientific classification
- Kingdom: Animalia
- Phylum: Chordata
- Class: Actinopterygii
- Order: Cichliformes
- Family: Cichlidae
- Genus: Oreochromis
- Species: O. placidus

Binomial name
- Oreochromis placidus Trewavas, 1941

= Oreochromis placidus =

Species of fish

The black tilapia (Oreochromis placidus) is a freshwater species of fish of the genus Oreochromis, found in the wide region of Southern Africa. It is a edible tropical fish.

== Description ==
The black tilapia can grow to the recorded maximum length of 35.5 cm (14 inches). The fish is silvery to steel-grey, with white abdomen. There is a red or orange margin on the dorsal and grey or black marblings on the gill-cover. The species are only reported to be found in fresh water at low altitudes and latitudes which suggests its relatively low salinity and temperature tolerances.

== Distribution ==
The species are mainly found in the lower Zambezi river and other rivers southwards such as Runde, Pungwe, Rovuma and Buzi river. It is also found in the lakes nearby.
