= Oreochromis upembae =

Conservation status
- Least Concern (IUCN 3.1)

Scientific classification
- Kingdom: Animalia
- Phylum: Chordata
- Class: Actinopterygii
- Order: Cichliformes
- Family: Cichlidae
- Genus: Oreochromis
- Species: O. upembae

Binomial name
- Oreochromis upembae Thys van den Audenaerde, 1948

Species of fish

Oreochromis upembae is a freshwater species of cichlid found in the Democratic Republic of Congo, particularly in the upper parts of the Congo river and the Lualaba river, its range including parts of Upemba. They are benthopelargic bottom feeders. The largest known specimen has a length of 21 cm (8.3 in). They are mouthbrooders.

Its appearance is similar to that of Oreochromis malagarasi, although it was differentiated by a number of features; including a caudal fin with less scales than O. malagarasi, not having the regular dark patterns (stripes or spots) on said caudal fin, and smaller range of dorsal spines.
