= Lugubria rosemariae =

Conservation status
- Least Concern (IUCN 3.1)

Scientific classification
- Kingdom: Animalia
- Phylum: Chordata
- Class: Actinopterygii
- Order: Cichliformes
- Family: Cichlidae
- Genus: Lugubria
- Species: L. rosemariae

Binomial name
- Lugubria rosemariae S. O. Kullander, 1997

Synonyms
- Crenicichla rosemariae

Species of fish

Lugubria rosemariae is a species of cichlid native to South America. It is found in the upper Xingu River drainage; Suiá-Missu River, Amazon River basin in Brazil. This species reaches a length of 24.4 cm (9.6 in).

The fish is named in honor of Rosemary Lowe-McConnell (1921-2014), who collected the type specimen.
