= Geita Airport =

Regional airport in Tanzania

Geita Airport Uwanja wa Ndege wa Geita (Swahili)
- IATA: GIT; ICAO: HTGE

Summary
- Airport type: Public
- Owner: Government of Tanzania
- Operator: Tanzania Airports Authority
- Location: Chato, Geita Region, Tanzania
- Elevation AMSL: 3,898 ft (1,188 m)
- Coordinates: 2°44′32.36″S 31°42′24.32″E
- Website: www.taa.go.tz

Map
- Location of Geita Airport.

Runways
Direction	Length		Surface
Direction	m	ft	Surface
13/31	3,000	9,843	Asphalt
- Source: TCAA

Geita Airport (IATA: GIT, ICAO: HTGE) is a small regional airport in northern Tanzania serving the city of Geita. It is located near the south western shores of Lake Victoria approximately 14 kilometres (8.7 mi) from the town of Chato. The airport has the longest runway and only asphalt runway in the Geita Region.

== History ==
Construction of the airport began in 2017 14 kilometres (8.7 mi) south of the town of Chato and 90 kilometres (56 mi) west of the regional capital Geita. The project approximately cost TSh 40 billion and was entirely funded by the Government of Tanzania. The airport was built to serve the region of Geita, a region that produces more than half of the countries gold exports.

The airport got its first scheduled flight in January 2021 by Air Tanzania connecting Julius Nyerere International Airport and Mwanza Airport.

=== President Magufuli ===
The airport is located close to Tanzania's 5th president John Magufuli home town. During various trips to his home region in 2019 and during the early days of the COVID-19 pandemic, when Magufuli decided to stay at home, the airport hosted various regional heads of state for bilateral meetings. These include

- Uhuru Kenyatta, President of Kenya on 5 July 2019
- Yoweri Museveni, President of Uganda on 13 July 2019 and on 13 September 2020
- Filipe Nyusi, President of Mozambique on 11 January 2021
- Sahle-Work Zewde, President of Ethiopia on 25 January 2021

== Airlines and destinations ==
=== Passenger ===
Airlines	Destinations
Air Tanzania	Dar es Salaam, Mwanza
