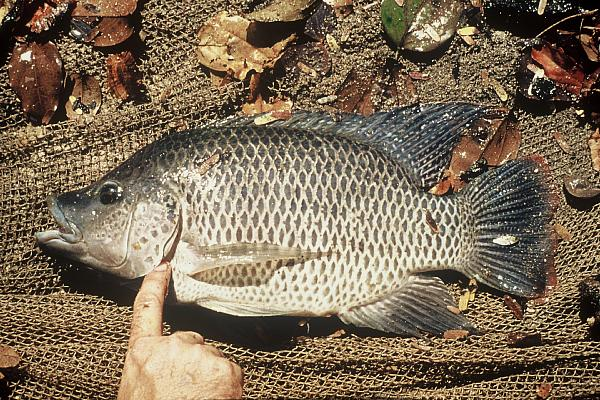

Conservation status
- Critically Endangered (IUCN 3.1)

Scientific classification
- Kingdom: Animalia
- Phylum: Chordata
- Class: Actinopterygii
- Order: Cichliformes
- Family: Cichlidae
- Genus: Oreochromis
- Species: O. mortimeri

Binomial name
- Oreochromis mortimeri (Trevawas, 1966)

Synonyms
- Tilapia mortimeri Trewavas, 1966; Sarotherodon mortimeri (Trewavas, 1966)

= Oreochromis mortimeri =

Species of fish

Oreochromis mortimeri, the Kariba tilapia or kurper bream, is a species of cichlid, formerly classified as a Tilapiine cichlid but now placed in the genus Oreochromis, the type genus of the tribe Oreochromini of the subfamily Pseudocrenilabrinae. It is found in the rivers of south central Africa especially the middle Zambezi where it is endangered by the spread of invasive congener Oreochromis niloticus.

== Description ==
Oreochromis mortimeri is greenish grey, green-blue or grey-blue marked with darker spots on each of its scales. The females and immature males often have 1–3 dark blotches in the middle of their flanks although these may only be visible as the fish dies. The breeding males are mainly iridescent, shading from blue-green to bronze and they have iridescent spots on their dorsal and caudal fins. The dorsal fin has a red margin that is not as obvious as it is in O. mossambicus, with a thin red band at posterior end of caudal fin, whereas that of O. mossambicus is noticeably wider. The jaws of mature males are obviously enlarged.

== Distribution ==
Oreochromis mortimeri is endemic to the middle Zambezi valley form the Cahora Bassa gorge to the Victoria Falls. Its distribution includes the Luangwa River and its tributaries. It occurs in Mozambique, Zimbabwe and Zambia.

== Biology ==
Oreochromis mortimeri is a schooling species which is predominantly diurnal. It is also tolerant of higher salinities. Its diet largely consists of filamentous algae and diatoms, and also includes some vascular plants, Dipteran larvae, other insects, cladocerans, copepods, shrimps, annelids and molluscs.

The male makes a saucer-shaped depression with a raised mound in the middle as a nest situated within a breeding arena in water less than 4 metres (13 ft) in depth. The male attracts the females to the arena using a courtship display. The female lays the eggs and they are fertilised by the male before she collects them in her mouth. The mouthbrooding females do not feed and may form shoals. The eggs hatch after around ten days but the larvae remain in their mother's mouth for a few more days. Once the yolk has been consumed the fry undertake brief feeding sorties, staying close to their mother and darting into her mouth when threatened. Around a fortnight after hatching the female releases the 1 centimetre (0.39 in) young fish in nursery areas of warm shallow water close to the banks, where the young fish group in small shoals in which they forage independently. The female then goes back to the breeding arena where she spawns again. Breeding occurs throughout the year.

== Conservation ==
The IUCN classify O. mortimeri as Critically Endangered and the main threat to this species is the invasive Oreochromis niloticus which has been introduced into most of the range of O. mortimeri by aquaculture and by anglers. Studies in Lake Kariba have shown that O. niloticus has higher growth rates than O.mortmeri and this is inferred to be a competitive advantage for the invasive species. It was also found that O. niloticus is more aggressive towards O. mortimeri and that the larger the size of individual O. niloticus then the more aggressive it was to smaller specimens of O. mortimeri, the higher growth rates of the invasive species meaning that they were normally the larger individuals. The nature of the distribution of O. mortimeri means that there are no natural impediments to O. niloticus spreading throughout its range and it has already displaced the native species in much of Lake Kariba, especially in areas where there are fish farms rearing O. niloticus, a practice which began in the 1990s.

== Etymology ==
The specific name of this fish honours M. A. E. Mortimer who was a Research and Administrative Officer of the Zambian Department of Game and Fisheries and who studied the Tilapiine fishes of Zambia as well as arranging for Ethelwynn Trewavas to take a trip to the Luangwa Valley to study this fish in its natural habitat.
