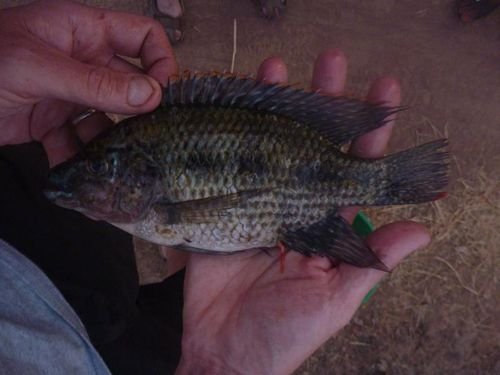

Conservation status
- Critically Endangered (IUCN 3.1)

Scientific classification
- Kingdom: Animalia
- Phylum: Chordata
- Class: Actinopterygii
- Order: Cichliformes
- Family: Cichlidae
- Genus: Oreochromis
- Species: O. karomo

Binomial name
- Oreochromis karomo (Poll, 1948)

Synonyms
- Tilapia karomo Poll, 1948; Sarotherodon karomo (Poll, 1948)

= Karomo =

Species of fish

The karomo (Oreochromis karomo) is a species of cichlid endemic to Tanzania, where it is found in the Malagarasi River basin. This species can reach a standard length of 28 cm (11 in). It is also considered an excellent food fish and is sought after by commercial fisheries as well as being farmed.
