= Comprehensive Community Based Rehabilitation Tanzania =

Tanzanian non-governmental organisation

Comprehensive Community Based Rehabilitation Tanzania (CCBRT) is a Tanzanian healthcare NGO. It is one of Tanzania's largest providers of disability and rehabilitation services.

CCBRT works with the Tanzanian government to provide free and subsidized services to low-income Tanzanians in four core areas: ophthalmology; orthopedics and physical rehabilitation; plastic surgery and reconstructive surgery; and maternal, newborn and child health (including fistula).

CCBRT was established in 1994. In 2004 CCBRT started offering private services to help subsidize health care costs, and in 2018 a new private clinic building was opened. Willibrod Slaa is the President of the Board and its CEO from 2006 to 2018 was Erwin Telemans. Brenda Msangi was appointed CEO in December 2018.
