= Oreochromis chungruruensis =

Conservation status
- Critically Endangered (IUCN 3.1)

Scientific classification
- Kingdom: Animalia
- Phylum: Chordata
- Class: Actinopterygii
- Order: Cichliformes
- Family: Cichlidae
- Genus: Oreochromis
- Species: O. chungruruensis

Binomial name
- Oreochromis chungruruensis (C. G. E. Ahl, 1924)

Synonyms
- Tilapia chungruruensis C. G. E. Ahl, 1924; Sarotherodon chungruruensis (C. G. E. Ahl, 1924)

Species of fish

Oreochromis chungruruensis, the Kiungululu tilapia, is a species of cichlid fish that is endemic to Lake Chungruru (also known as Kiungululu), a small isolated crater lake in the Rungwe District in southern Tanzania. This species reaches up to 15.4 cm (6.1 in) in standard length and 19.5 cm (7.7 in) in total length. It is critically endangered due to overfishing and non-native tilapia species that have been introduced to Lake Chungruru.
