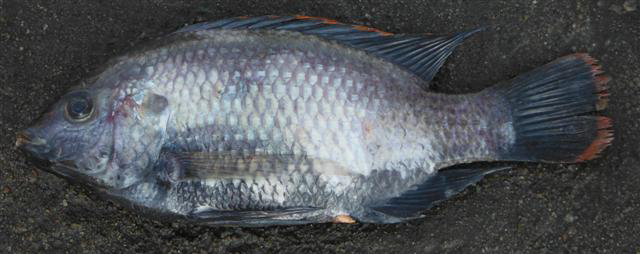

Conservation status
- Vulnerable (IUCN 3.1)

Scientific classification
- Kingdom: Animalia
- Phylum: Chordata
- Class: Actinopterygii
- Order: Cichliformes
- Family: Cichlidae
- Genus: Oreochromis
- Species: O. rukwaensis

Binomial name
- Oreochromis rukwaensis (Hilgendorf & Pappenheim, 1903)

Synonyms
- Tilapia nilotica Hilgendorf & Pappenheim, 1903; Sarotherodon rukwaensis (Hilgendorf & Pappenheim, 1903); Tilapia rukwaensis Hilgendorf & Pappenheim, 1903

= Lake Rukwa tilapia =

Species of fish

The Lake Rukwa tilapia (Oreochromis rukwaensis) is a species of cichlid that is endemic to the Lake Rukwa catchment in Tanzania. This species can reach a length of 33 centimetres (13 in) in standard length. This species is important to local commercial fisheries.

== Taxonomy ==
The Lake Rukwa tilapia was first described by Franz Martin Hilgendorf and Paul Pappenheim in 1903. It is classified in the family Cichlidae (ciclids) in the class Actinopterygii. It has been referred to by several synonyms, including Tilapia nilotica rukwaensis, Sarotherodon rukwaensis, and Tilapia rukwaensis.

== Description ==
The fish is silver-gray in color with a bluish snout and 6–7 vertical stripes past the operculum that are often only visible when freshly caught. Mating males are darker, almost black, with dorsal and caudal fins marked with red or orange at the margins. The dorsal fin has 15–17 spines and 11–13 soft rays; the anal fin has three spines and 10–11 soft rays. It is a deep-bodied fish with a small head. It has a maximum length of 33 centimetres (13 in) in standard length.

== Ecology ==
This species is only found in the Lake Rukwa drainage basin, in both lakes and rivers, primarily in Tanzania. It is an important target of commercial fishing. It is assessed as a vulnerable species on the IUCN Red List; its population is declining due to overfishing, urban waste water pollution, and agricultural runoff; the species also faces habitat fragmentation.

== Reproduction ==
Males of the species build a raised platform, surrounded by a circular depression, in shallow water to serve as their mating territory. The females are mouthbrooders.
