= Lake Burigi =

- Lueor-lo-Urigi
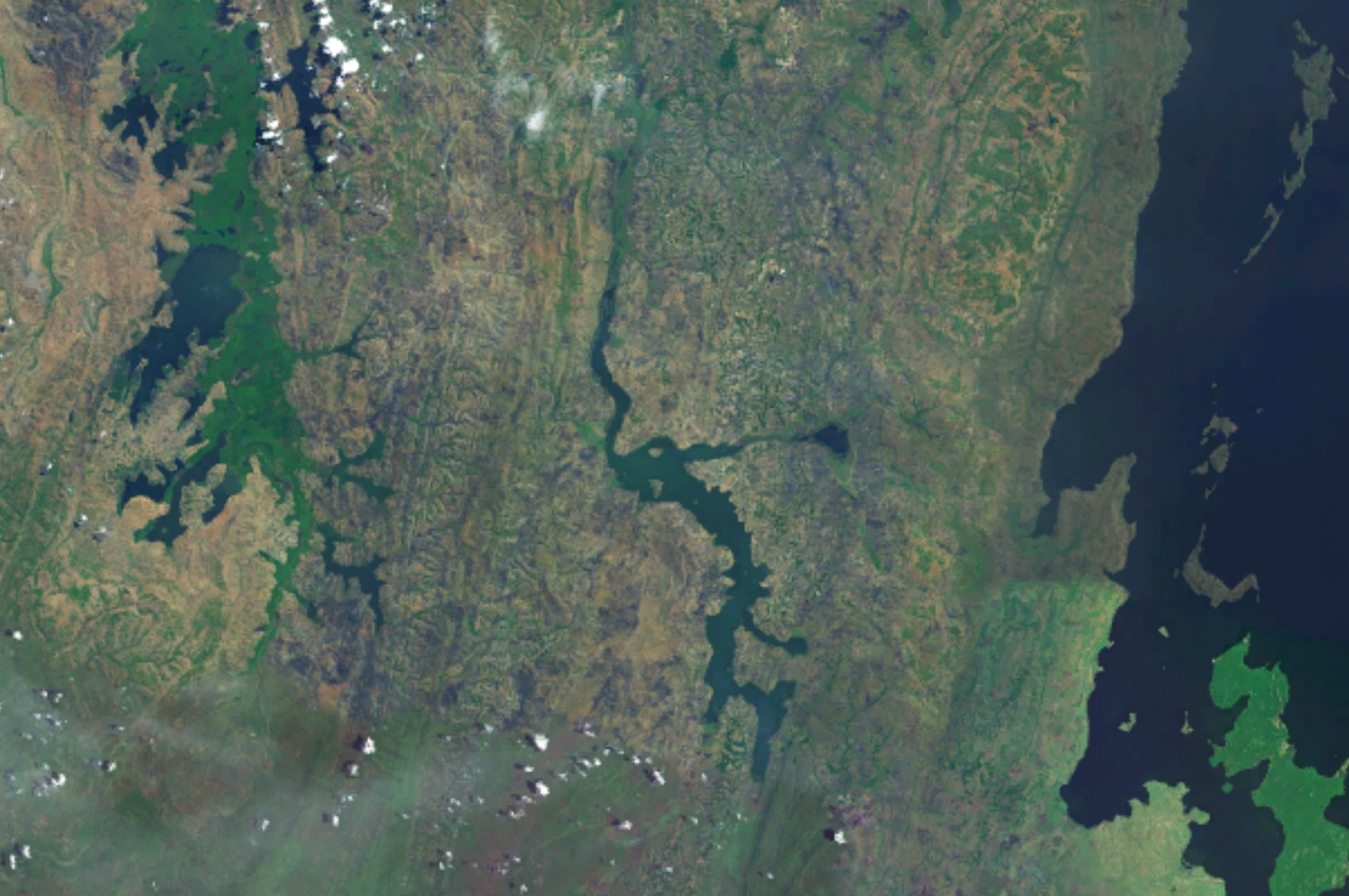
- Lake Burigi

- Location within Tanzania
- Location: Tanzania
- Coordinates: 2.123°S 31.315°E
- Primary inflows: Ruiza River
- Primary outflows: Mwisa to Kagera River
- Max. length: 18 kilometres (11 mi)
- Max. width: 4 kilometres (2.5 mi)
- Surface area: 7,000 hectares (17,000 acres)

Lake Burigi (originally Lueor-lo-Urigi, meaning "White Lake of Urigi") is a lake in the Karagwe district, Kagera Region of Tanzania. Parts of the lake and its shore are situated within the Burigi-Chato National Park.

== History ==
Visited by Dr. Hans Meyer's East African expedition, its name on maps of the time was Urigi. The lake's discovery is attributed to Capt. John Hanning Speke, who name it Lueor-lo-Urigi ("White Lake of Urigi").

== Geography ==
The lake is 18 kilometres (11 mi) long and 4 kilometres (2.5 mi) wide. It has an elongated shape, the greatest distance between the two extremities being about 30 kilometres (19 mi). It is so narrow that from one side, the other can always clearly be seen. The lake's water is bright azure in color.

Its area measures approximately 7,000 hectares (17,000 acres). Fed by rivers from surrounding hills, the largest is Ruiza River. The lake is visible from Useni or Kavari. Papyrus swamps and groundwater forest areas occur around the lake. The surrounding hills are brown, with dark green bush scatterings. Its receding waters have left great extents of flat plain on the sides and around the bays running far inland into valleys. The lake is sunk about 1,200 feet (370 m) below the average level of the bare grassy hills around it. There is a narrow basin at the head of the lake. Its shore is broken by numerous inlets.

The Yanghiro district, which is situated on the eastern shore of the Urigi, is a hilly region, scattered over with villages and cultivated fields, as well as with woods of banana-trees.

The study area received an average rainfall of 964.36 mm per year, the highest peak recorded in 1951. The trend of rainfall showed that many years had rainfall below the average while the temperature was found to increase from year to year, the situation which suggests the existence of climate change in the study area.

== Flora and fauna ==
Its shores and waters are favored by birds, such as cranes, herons, pelicans, African jacanas, egrets and waders, which find excellent feeding over the large spaces near the extremities and shore line of bays. These are covered with close-packed growths of Pistia stratiotes rigl plants. Kobus ellipsiprymnus and Hippopotamus amphibius frequent the area. There are armies of black mosquitoes. Lake fish were infested with guinea worm at the time of Stanley's expedition.
