= Burigi-Chato National Park =

Protected area in Tanga Region, Tanzania

- IUCN category II (national park)
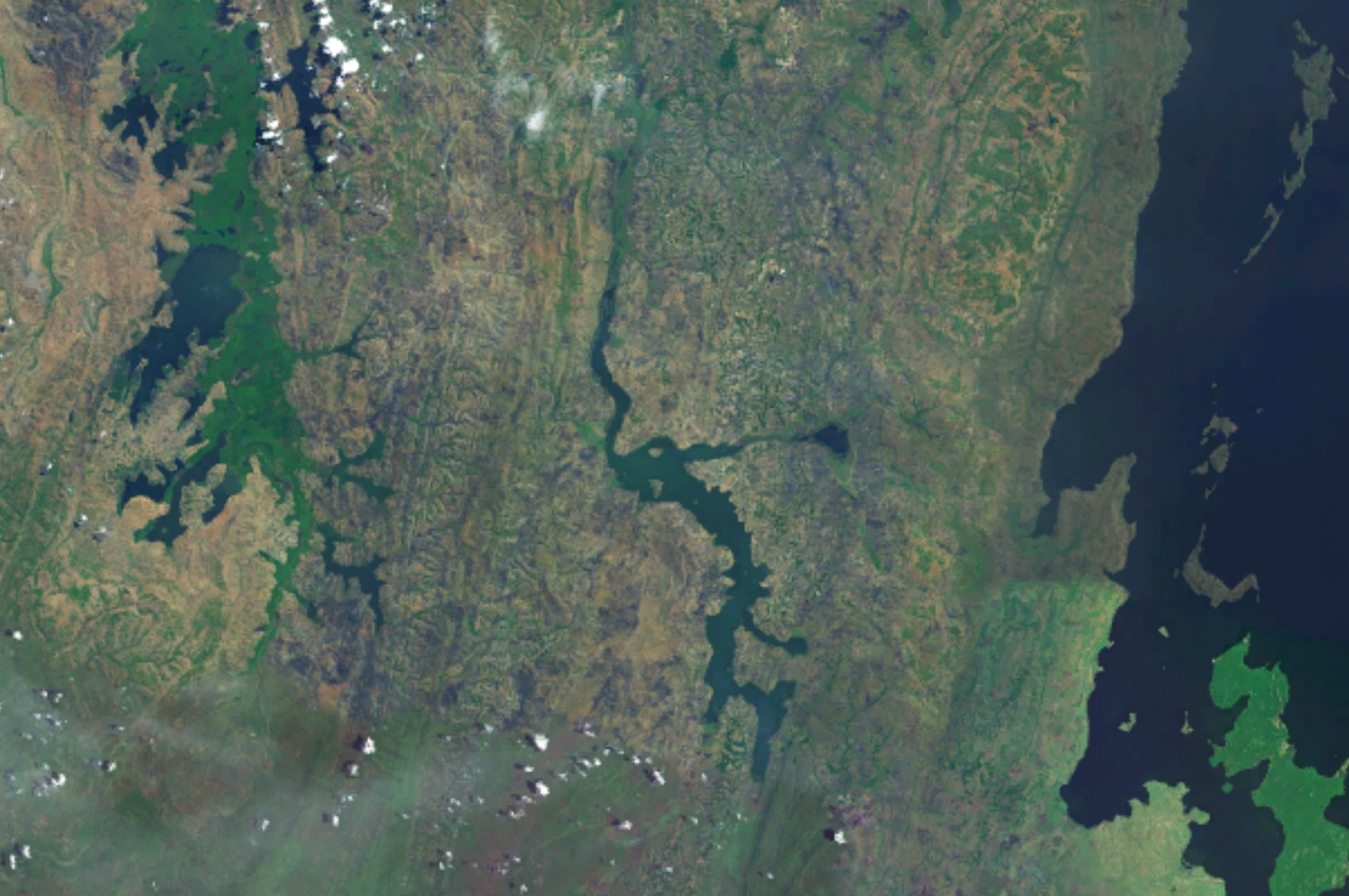
- Lake Burigi

- Location within Tanzania
- Location: Karagwe, Biharamulo District, Muleba District and Chato of Kagera Region and Geita Region; Tanzania
- Nearest city: Chato, Tanzania
- Coordinates: 2°18′33.12″S 31°10′15.6″E
- Area: 4,707 km^{2} (1,817 mi^{2})
- Designation: National Park
- Established: 2019
- Named for: Lake Burigi and Chato District
- Governing body: Tanzania National Parks Authority under the Ministry of Natural Resources and Tourism
- Website: Official Page

The Burigi-Chato National Park (Hifadhi ya Taifa ya Burigi-Chato, In Swahili) is a Tanzanian national park located the Karagwe, Biharamulo District, Muleba District of Kagera Region and Chato of Geita Region. With a total area of 4,707 square kilometers, Burigi-Chato is Tanzania's fourth-largest park and was designated a national park in 2019. From Lake Victoria in the east to the Rwandan border in the west, Burigi-Chato is a sizable region of uninhabited land. Hundreds of square kilometers of medium- and tall-grass wooded savanna, primarily Combretum and Terminalia known as Miombo, are found there. The largest freshwater lake is Lake Burigi, after which the park is named. Other features include long hills, rocky crags along escarpments, deeply set valleys lined with forest, open plains, swamps, rivers, flood plains, and deep valleys.

== Unique flora ==
Zanthoxylum usambarense, Gardenia ternifolia, Faidherbia albida, Harrisonia abyssinica, Annona senegalensis, and Pappea capensis are six other rare plant species found at the Burigi-Chato National Park that have the potential to be used in the pharmaceutical industry.

== Attractions ==
The lakes in this national park are a major attraction, with Lake Burigi being the third-largest lake in the nation. It is a long lake with several islands, inlets, and bays scattered throughout its length, some of which are swampy and home to the uncommon sitatunga antelope and perhaps even the even more elusive shoebill stork. Every lake is situated along a winding valley that is covered in trees and sporadic palms. They offer peaceful surroundings, options for boating and observing wildlife from the lake, as well as locations for camping and modest cabins.

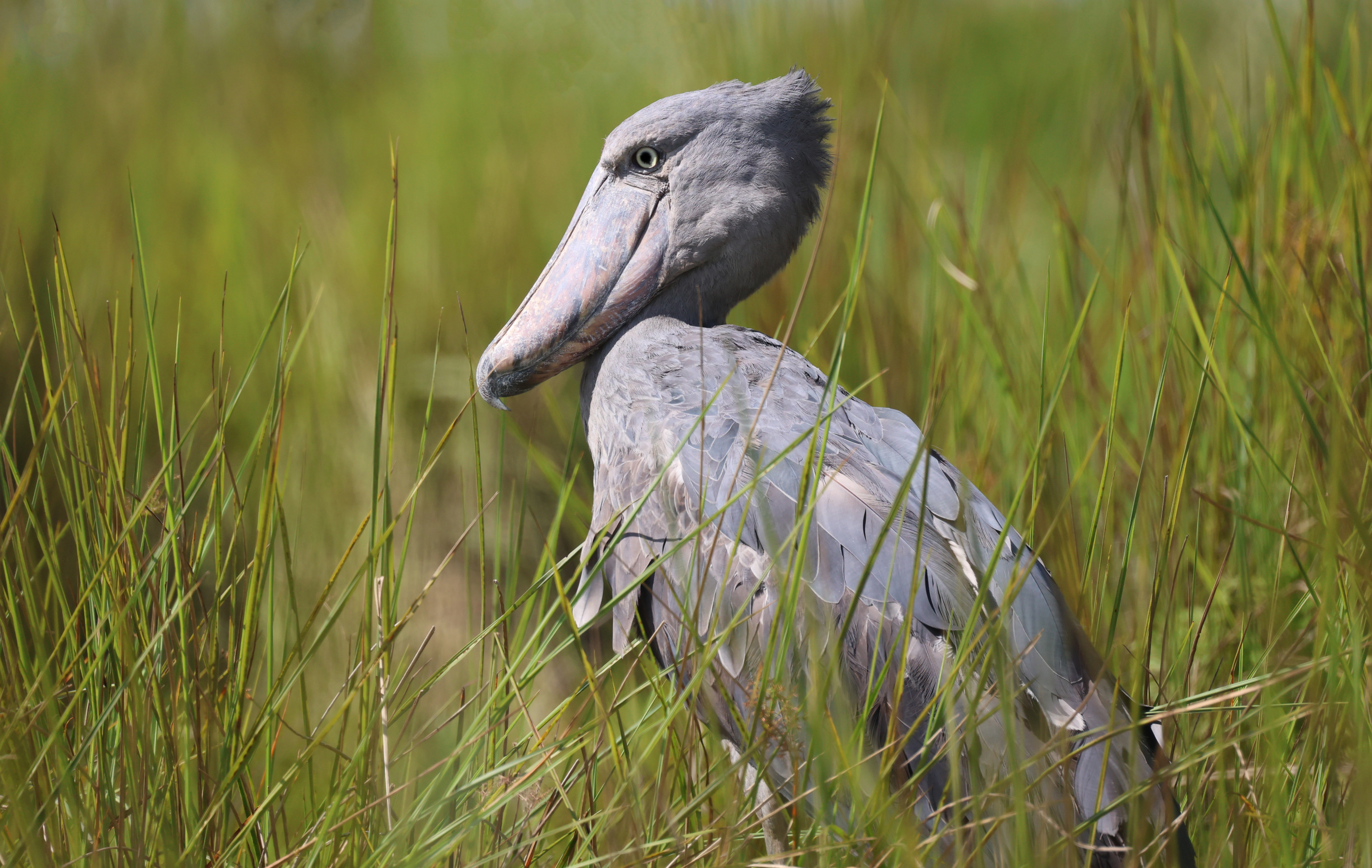
Shoebill (Balaeniceps rex) a common bird in Burigi-Chato National Park

Along with the rangeland area to the north of the Katungo River and the Lake Mburo National Park of Uganda, Burigi-Chato National Park includes the other ecosystems of Rwanda like the Akagera National Park. Camping and canoeing is available.
