= Willibrod Slaa =

Tanzanian politician and diplomat

Honorable Willibrod Slaa
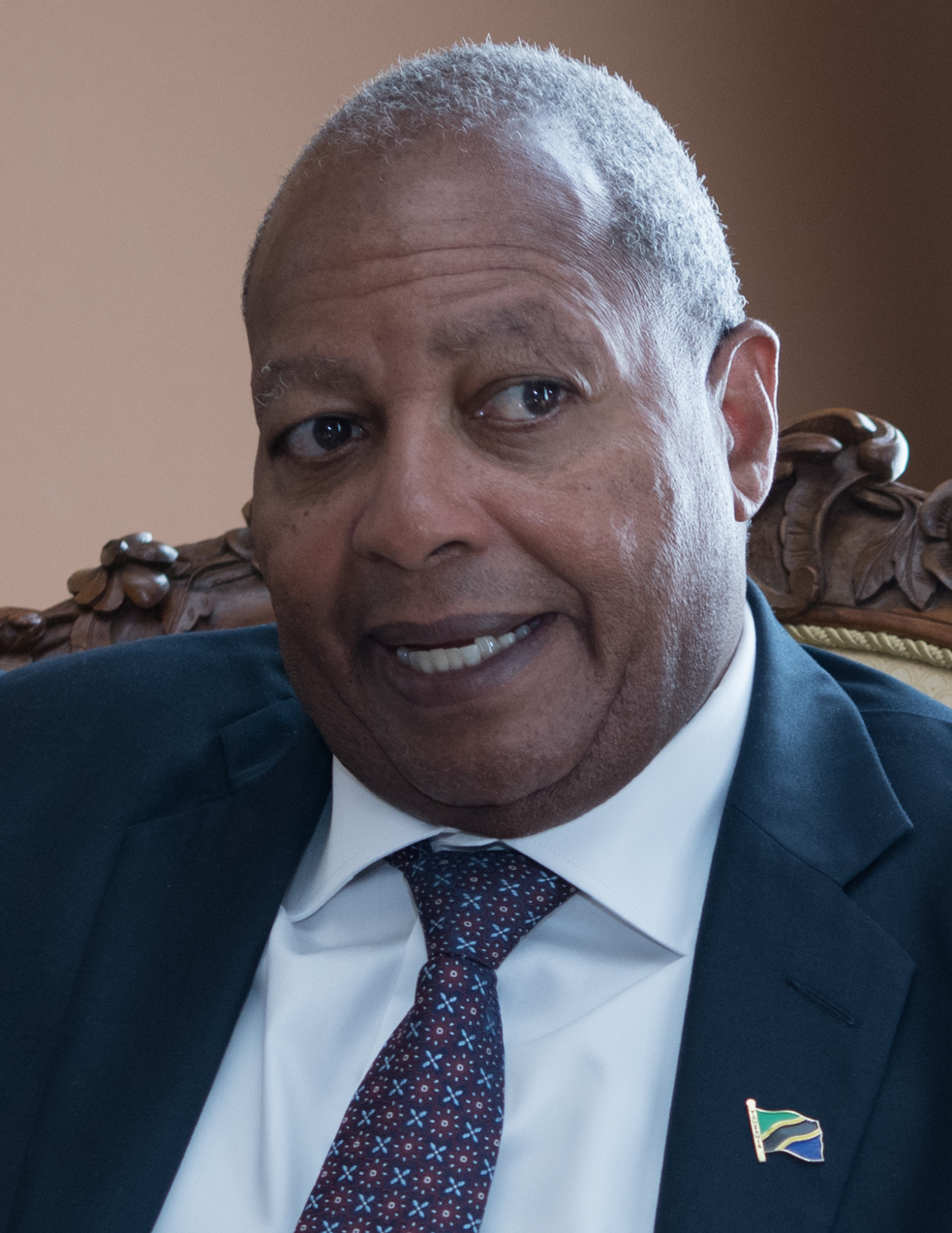

Member of Parliament for Karatu
- In office 1995–2010
- Succeeded by: Israel Natse

Tanzania Ambassador to Sweden
- In office 6 April 2018 – September 2021
- President: John Magufuli

Tanzania Ambassador to Finland
- In office 2017 – September 2021
- President: John Magufuli

Personal details
- Born: 29 October 1948 (age 77) Karatu District, Tanganyika
- Party: Chadema (1996-2015); Chama Cha Mapinduzi (before 1995)
- Education: Kibosho Seminary School; Kipalapala Seminary
- Alma mater: Pontifical Urban University
- Profession: Politician, Diplomat, Theologian
- Known for: Co-Founder of CCBRT Tanzania

Willibrod Peter Slaa is a Tanzanian Politician, Diplomat and President of the Board of CCBRT Tanzania. He is a former Member of Parliament for Karatu Constituency from 1995 to 2010.

He has been an ambassador to Sweden and Finland. He rejoined Chadema in March 2025.

== Early life ==
Willibrod Peter Slaa was born on October 29, 1948, in Karatu Constituency in Manyara Region.

== Education ==
Slaa attended Kibosho Seminary School in Kilimanjaro Region, where he got a certificate in philosophy in 1973, and Kipalapala Seminary in Tabora Region, where he obtained a certificate in theology in 1977.

== Career ==
From 1985 to 1991, Slaa was secretary-general of the Tanzania Episcopal Conference and between 1982 and 1985, he was director of the Diocese of Mbulu Development. Between 1992 and 1998, he was managing director of the Tanzania Society for the Blind. Slaa was elected Chadema secretary-general in 2002. He previously served as Chadema vice-chairman from 1998 to 2002 and Chadema MP for Karatu and member of the party’s National Executive Committee.
