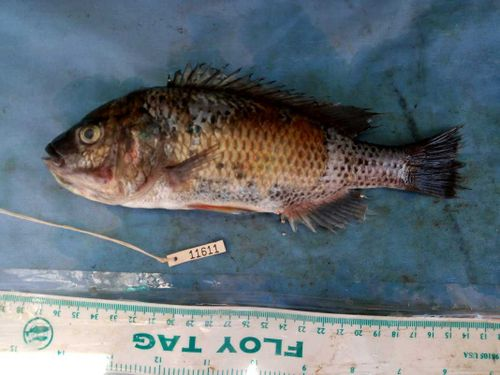

Conservation status
- Critically Endangered (IUCN 3.1)

Scientific classification
- Kingdom: Animalia
- Phylum: Chordata
- Class: Actinopterygii
- Order: Cichliformes
- Family: Cichlidae
- Genus: Oreochromis
- Species: O. hunteri

Binomial name
- Oreochromis hunteri Günther, 1889

Synonyms
- Sarotherodon hunteri (Günther, 1889); Tilapia hunteri (Günther, 1889)

= Lake Chala tilapia =

Species of fish

The Lake Chala tilapia (Oreochromis hunteri) is a species of cichlid fish that is endemic to Lake Chala, a small crater lake on the border of Kenya and Rombo District of Kilimanjaro Region in Tanzania. It mostly lives in relatively deep water, at depths between 20–45 m (66–148 ft). It is considered critically endangered by the IUCN, with the two primary threats being deterioration of its habitat due to siltation, and other non-native tilapia species that have been introduced to Lake Chala. Before these introductions, the Lake Chala tilapia was the only fish in Lake Chala. It is very closely related to the similar Jipe tilapia (O. jipe), another highly threatened species from the same general region of Kenya and Tanzania. The Lake Chala tilapia can reach a standard length of up to 30 cm (12 in).

The specific name hunteri honours the British zoologist Henry C. V. Hunter (1861-1934), who collected the type, and who provided notes on this species' distribution. O. hunteri is the type species of the genus Oreochromis.

== Taxonomy ==
This species belongs to the family Cichlidae and the genus Oreochromis. Cichlid species in the genus Oreochromis are widely used in aquaculture around the world and provide an important source of food and income for many East African people. Many species in the genus Oreochromis have potential to hybridize with another, meaning they can cross breed and reproduce due to their genetic compatibility. O. hunteri is an endemic species to Lake Chala meaning it is only found there and nowhere else in the world. The endemic species in the Pagnani system region which includes Lake Chala are O. jipe and O. pangani who are all closely related to O. hunteri .

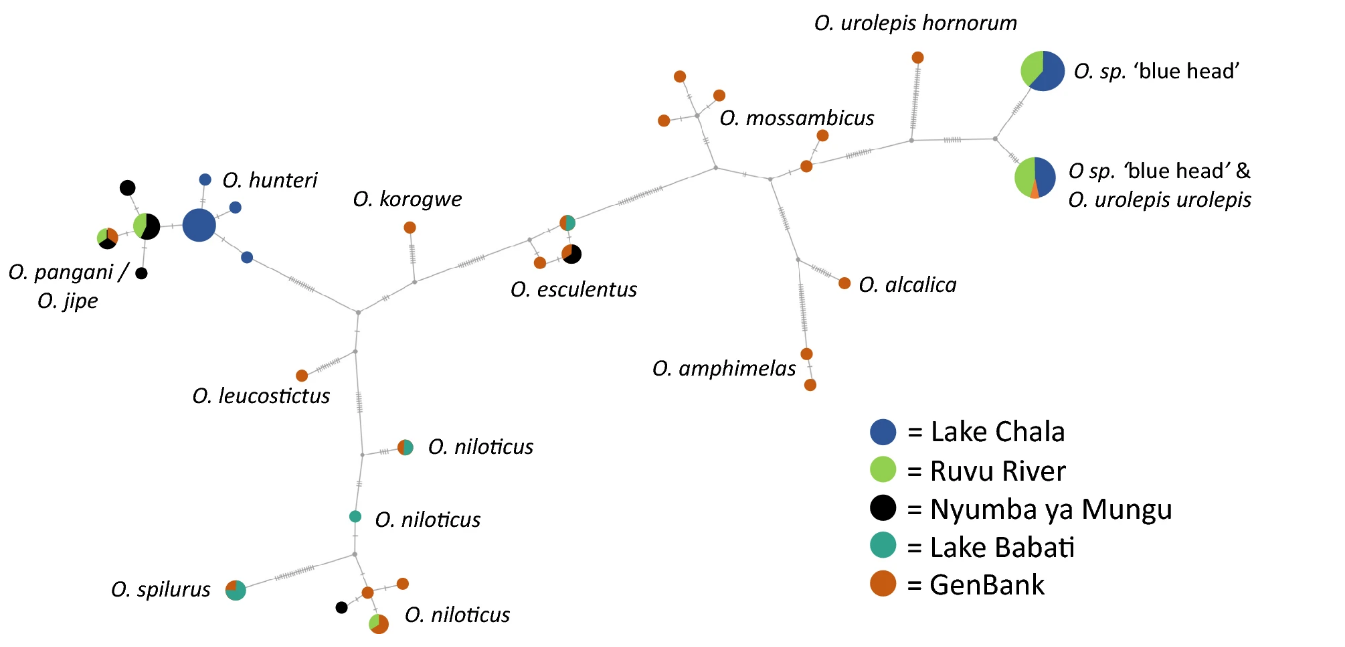
Phylogeographic Tree of Tilapia in Lake Chala from Moser et al. 2019. This tree demonstrates how unique O. hunteri is from modern Tilapia representing a unique evolutionary lineage

Given the genetic compatibility between species of the genus Oreochromis, studies show that they are morphologically distinct from one another, with having longer and wider heads, shorter lower jaws and smaller or bigger eyes. As new Cichlid species begin to colonize, the phylogenetic tree within this genus starts to show an early sign of divergence as many studies conducted within the Pagnani system show evidence of ecological diversification among the cichlids in Lake Chala.

== Description ==
O. hunteri is characterized by their large, compressed bodies with a terminal mouth and forward snout. Teeth are small oriented in a narrow band made to crush shells of small invertebrates and a narrow pharyngeal bone. Their dorsal fins are continuous with 15-18 spines and 12-14 rays. Anal fins have 3 spines and 7 –12 rays. They also have a truncate caudal fin, which provide a balance of speed and mobility.

Little is known about the early life stages and morphological developments of O. hunteri, however, tilapia juvenile morphology differ from adults. Being closely related from the phylogeographic tree, O. jipe and O. pangani share a similar evolutionary background within the Lake Chala river. Studies show that this genus have a moderate growth rate and are sexually matured when they reach at least 8 – 10 cm in length. Juveniles of these species have a slender body with vertical bars and mottled pigmentation for possible camouflage to avoid predation. Bar marks start to fade as juveniles grow, and bodies start becoming more vertically compressed and the sexual dimorphic characteristics start to become noticeable between male and females.

Males are characterized with a melanin pattern on top of their head, their flank scales are darker on the posterior side of the fish, and a light grey-blue background. The dorsal fins are much darker in color than their ventral side. Females have fewer contrasting colors with flanks being grey in color or olive with a lighter ventral side region.

== Distribution ==
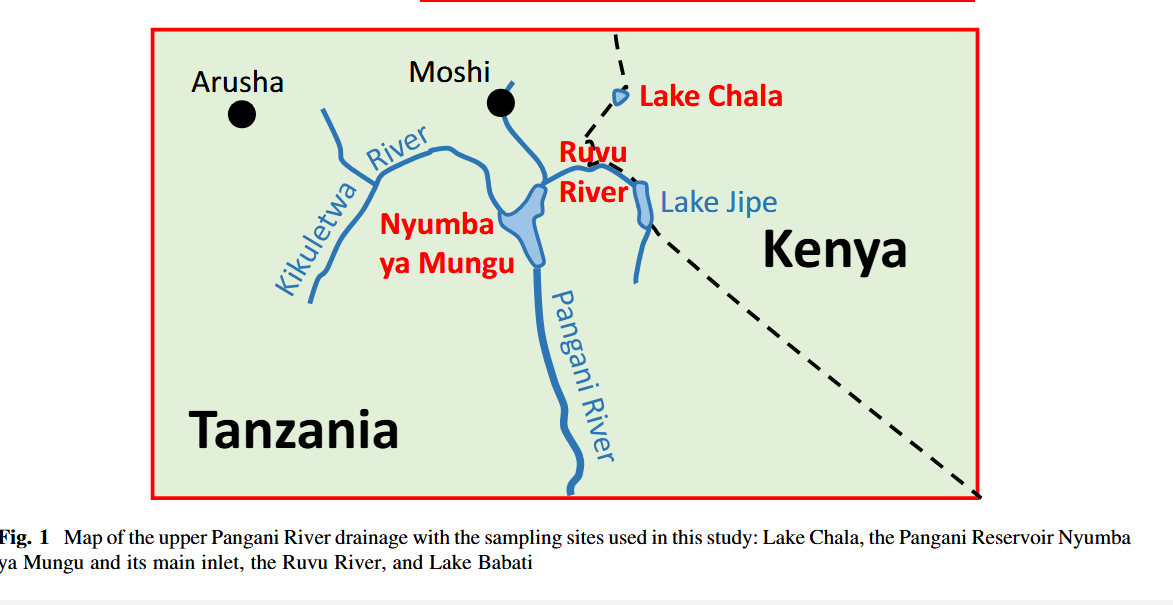
Map of the Pangani River drainage system from Moser et al. 2019

O. hunteri is native to Lake Chala, a small (4.2 km²) crater lake located on the border between Kenya and Tanzania near Mount Kilimanjaro (3°19′S, 37°42′E). O. hunteri consists of occupying zones in the water column that is near the shore, which is known as the littoral zone, as well as open pelagic waters of the lake which is known as the limnetic zone. However, from the introduction of invasive tilapia species, O. hunteri has a much narrower distribution, demonstrating a higher abundance in the limnetic zone of Lake Chala. Catches have been recorded from depths between 20 and 45 meters showing how competition from invasive tilapia species changed their distribution abundance in Lake Chala resulting in major feeding partitioning.

== Biology ==
The biology of O. hunteri follows many typical tilapia character traits but also reflects unique feeding methods specialized to an isolated crater lake environment. Females are maternal mouthbrooders in which they carry their offspring in their mouths to ensure the best survivability for their offspring. They have showcase multiple spawning events per year. Although little data is known to fecundity, age of maturity and maximum lifespan for Lake Chala tilapia, however inferred patterns from closely related species like O. jipe and O. pangani indicate females are typically paler and lighter in mouthbrooding periods following the consistent trend of spawning seasonally throughout the year which are traits likely to be similar to O. hunteri.

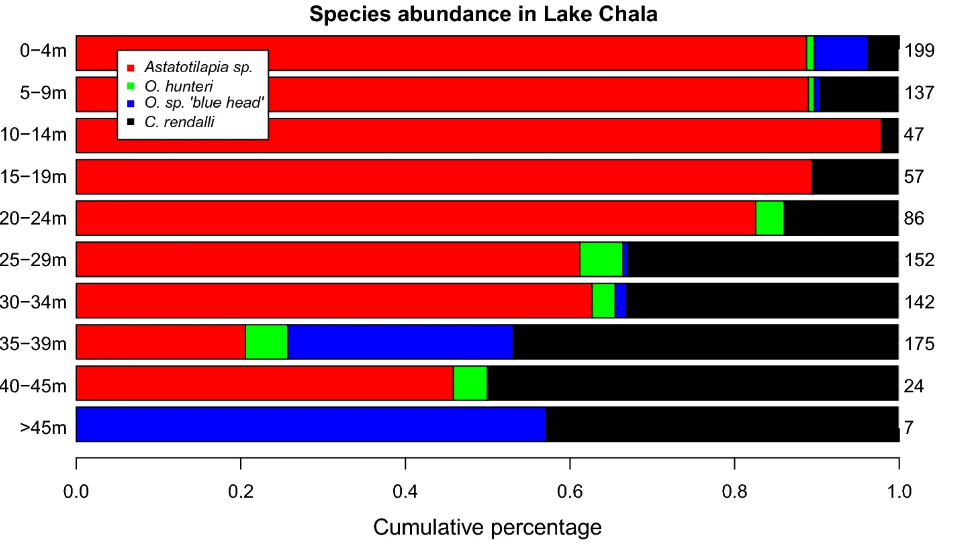
Abundances of Tilapia in Lake Chala from Moser et al. 2019

O. hunteri are an important ecological contributor among native fish fauna as a primary consumer and reflect their specialization in nutrient limited waters. Due to the diverse niche, Lake Chala provides many numerous cichlid populations which are omnivorous due to the adaptation to lacustrine habitats where the water is not flowing and surrounded by vegetation, as well as dietary.

Their feeding method primarily involves coursing in the water column eating algae and phytoplankton in the limnetic zone. While not the fast swimmers, they swim moderately long distances with their truncate caudal fins and using their narrow small bands of teeth to feed on phytoplankton and algae. Many gastropods in the genus Melanoide were documented in high abundance, which prompted the Lake Chala cichlids to occasionally consume small invertebrates as it eats detritus along the soft bottom. Due to the small isolated habitat, O. hunteri maintained a narrow niche focused on benthic detrital resources, which is organic material on the lake bottom, because of the introduction of invasive species of Tilapia in Lake Chala that reinforced O. hunteri specialization on detrital and algal material.

== Conservation status ==
Oreochromis hunteri is currently listed as critically endangered, due to its limited geographic range from being in a single crater and having its realized niche smaller due to competition from the invasive tilapia species. O. hunteri is a specialist in its native habitat evolving in a closed ecosystem with no other competing species for many years in the past. The isolation of O. hunteri narrowed its niche specializing on feeding benthic detritus and algae. Following the introduction of invasive tilapia species into Lake Chala, recent studies indicate O. hunteri underwent adaptive loss in its habitat due to losing its territoriality shifting to a sympatric environment, meaning they are living alongside other species. Phenotypic variability within Lake Chala Tilapia remained consistent and there was no hybridization with other invasive species, giving us an understanding that O. hunteri did not acquire new traits or character displacement from the invasive tilapia species which caused its niche breadth to be smaller due to exploitative competition, resulting in competitive exclusion, forcing O. hunteri to feed in deeper waters which marked them as critically endangered from the IUCN.

Another reason for their decline in population is habitat destruction. Lake Chala’s habitat, being next to a mountain, has run off, increasing turbidity and the amount of sunlight in Lake Chala. In addition, anthropogenic factors cause inter-annual climate variability limiting the amount of deep-water nutrients to be upwelled, resulting in a decline of algae and phytoplankton being available for O. hunteri. Lake Chala Tilapia populations have survived major climate-driven alterations in the past, however, with the pressures of competition and having to cope with climate change may eventually lead to a linear decline of O. hunteri.

Proper management and monitoring of the current population size trends and patterns are necessary to find solutions and reduce the numbers of newly introduced species so that O. hunteri aren’t outcompeted in the wild. A good demographic modeling to further study life history parameters can be a good remedy to better understand fecundity and lifespan
