= Lake Chala =

Crater lake in Tanzania and Kenya

- Lake Challa
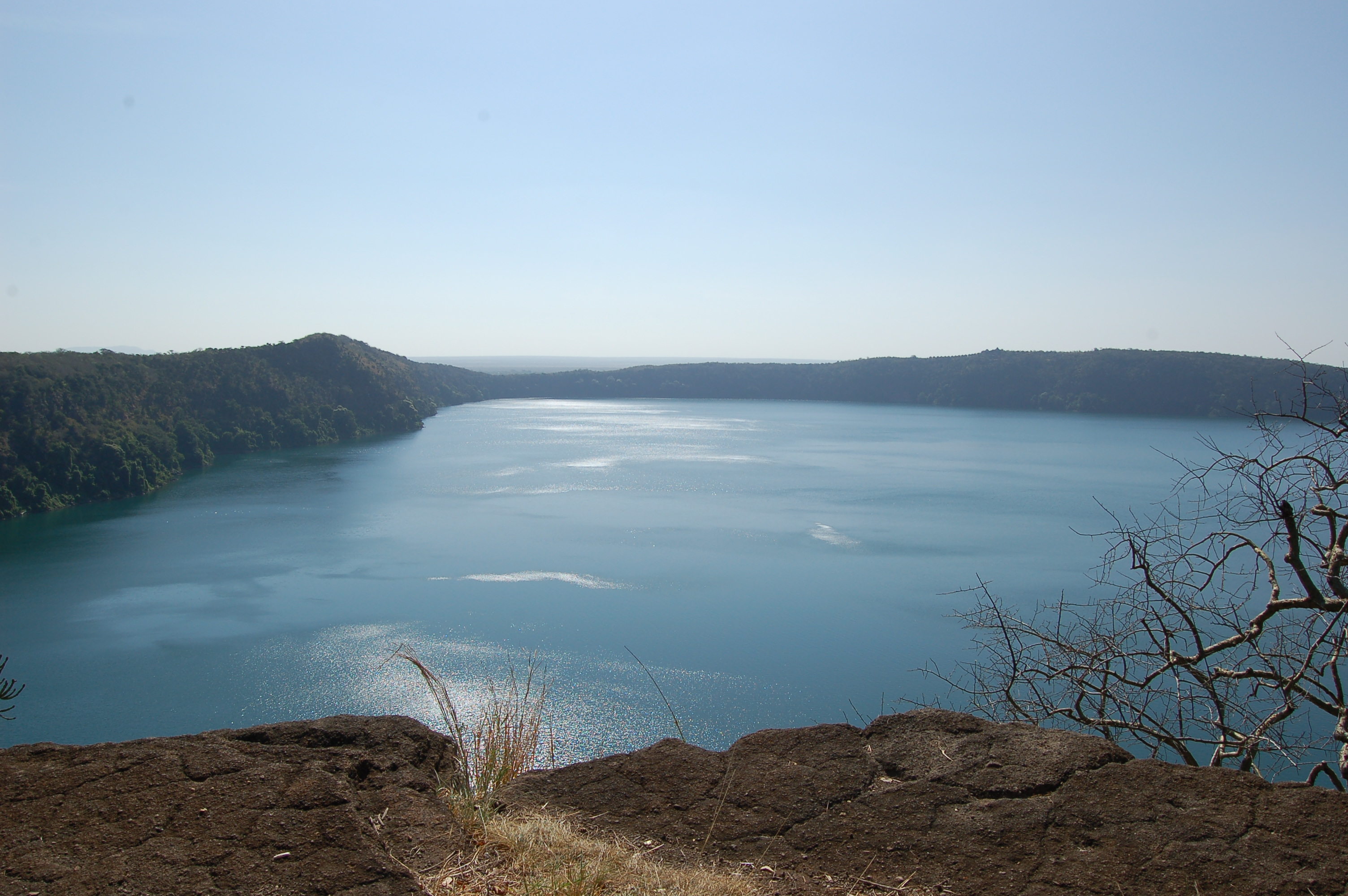

- Location within Tanzania Location within Africa
- Location: Straddles the border between Tanzania and Kenya in east Africa
- Coordinates: 3°19′S 37°42′E
- Type: Crater lake
- Primary inflows: Subsurface
- Primary outflows: Subsurface
- Catchment area: 1.38 to 1.43 square kilometres (0.53 to 0.55 sq mi)
- Basin countries: Rombo, Tanzania; Kenya
- Surface area: 4.2 square kilometres (1.6 sq mi); 4.5 square kilometres (1.7 sq mi)
- Max. depth: 98 metres (322 ft)
- Surface elevation: 880 metres (2,890 ft)

Lake Chala, also known as Lake Challa, is a crater lake that straddles the border between Kenya and Tanzania. The lake formed approximately 250,000 years ago. The lake is east of Mount Kilimanjaro, 8 kilometres (5.0 mi) north of Taveta, Kenya, and 55 kilometres (34 mi) east of Rombo District. The lake is surrounded by a steep crater rim with a maximum height of 170 metres (560 ft).

Lake Chala's average annual rainfall is about 565 millimetres (22.2 in). The lake surface has an average annual evaporation of near 1,735 millimetres (68.3 in). Approximately 80 percent of the lake's inflow comes from groundwater, which is derived mostly from rainfall in the montane forest zone of Mount Kilimanjaro at an elevation of 1,800 to 2,800 metres (5,900 to 9,200 ft). It takes about three months for groundwater to reach the lake. The groundwater flowed into the lake at an estimated annual volume of 8,390,000 cubic metres (296,000,000 cu ft) from 1964 through 1977.

== Ecology ==
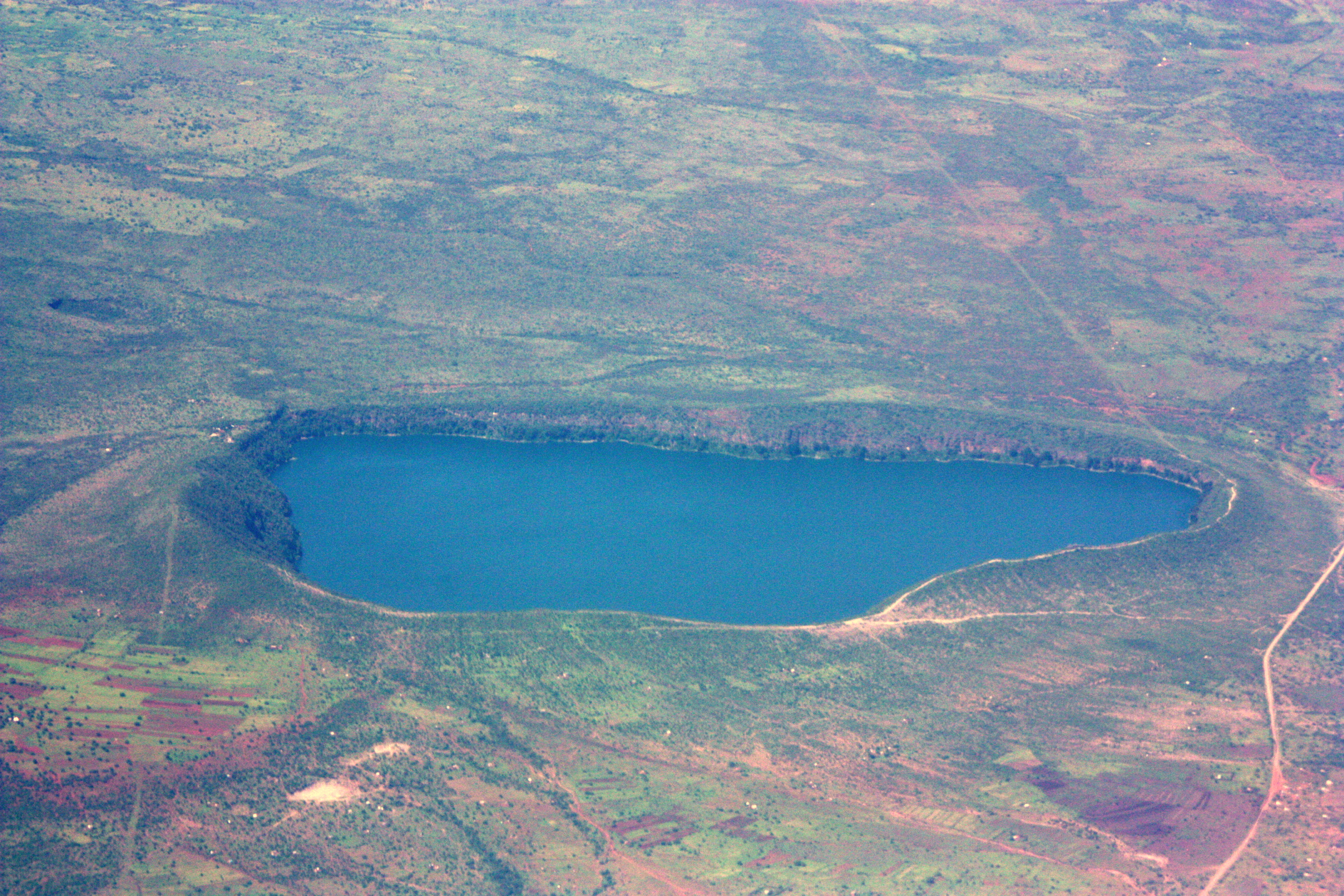
Aerial photo of Lake Chala

The only native fish in this lake is the Lake Chala tilapia (Oreochromis hunteri), which is found nowhere else in the world. It is considered critically endangered by the IUCN, and now greatly outnumbered by other tilapia species that have been introduced to Lake Chala.

An 18-year-old British woman was killed in 2002 by a relatively small Nile crocodile while swimming at night in the lake. A few days later, the Kenya Police Service said that the lake was "infested" with crocodiles, while the Kenya Wildlife Service said, "Crocodiles are found in Lake Chala and it is not regarded as safe to swim at all."

== See also ==
- Chaga people
- List of lakes of Kenya
- List of lakes of Tanzania
- Rombo District
