= Medical Stores Department =

- Bohari ya Dawa (Swahili)

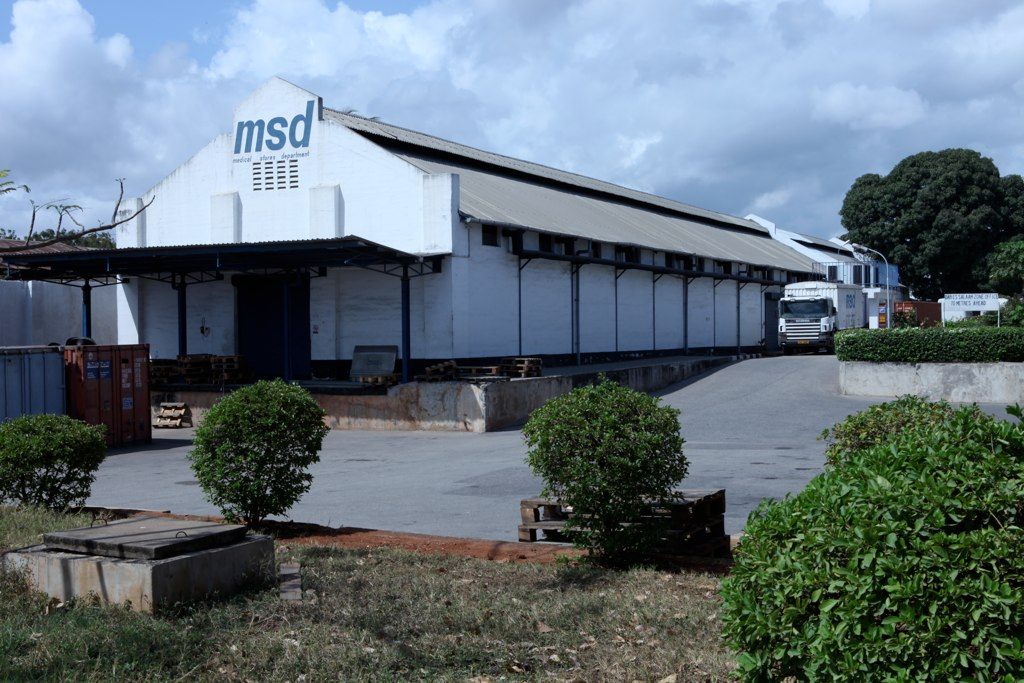
- Store in Dar es Salaam

Department overview
- Formed: 1993
- Type: Autonomous department
- Headquarters: Dar es Salaam, Tanzania
- Motto: Dedicated to save your life
- Minister responsible: Jenista Mhagama, Ministry of Health and Social Development, Gender, Elderly and Children
- Department executive: Mavere Tukai, Director General
- Key document: Act of Parliament No.13 of 1993
- Website: www.msd.go.tz

Medical Stores Department (MSD) was established by the Act of Parliament No.13 of 1993 as an autonomous department under the Ministry of Health, Social Development, Gender, Elderly and Children responsible for develop, maintain and manage an efficient and cost effective system of procurement, storage and distribution of approved medicines and medical supplies required for use by the public health services as the Ministry of Health, Social Development, Gender, Elderly and Children may from time to time approve.

== Corporate Affairs ==
=== Ownership ===
The Medical Stores Department is a parastatal agency wholly owned by the Government of Tanzania.

=== Governance ===
The company is an autonomous agency under the Ministry of Health and is governed by a board of trustees. The Board composed of nine members appointed every three years. The Chairman appointed by the President of the United Republic of Tanzania, eight members are appointed by the Minister responsible for health. The Board delegates the day-to-day management of the department operations to Director General who is appointed by the President of the United Republic of Tanzania.

== Branch Network ==
MSD Zonal stores.

The department operates through eight zonal stores in Dar-es-salaam, Mwanza, Iringa, Moshi, Mbeya, Tabora, Dodoma and Mtwara supported by two Sales Points in Tanga and Muleba. MSD is annually audited by CAG and has fully-fledged competent internal audit Unit that oversees internal controls effectiveness of each individual store and its supply chain.
