= Rosemary Lowe-McConnell =

British ichthyologist, ecologist, and limnologist

- Born: 24 June 1921; Liverpool, England
- Died: 22 December 2014 (aged 93); St. George’s Park, Ditchling, England
- Education: University of Liverpool
- Spouse: Richard McConnell
- Scientific career
- Fields: Ichthyology, limnology, and ecology

Rosemary Helen Lowe-McConnell (née Rosemary Helen Lowe; 24 June 1921 – 22 December 2014) was an English ichthyologist, ecologist, and limnologist known for research on tilapia and aquaculture. Working in the tropical waters of Africa and South America, Lowe-McConnell was a pioneer in the study of tropical fish ecology and an early adopter of the use of scuba diving for scientific research.

== Biography ==
Rosemary Helen Lowe was educated at Howell's School in Denbigh, Wales before receiving B.S., M.Sc., and D.Sc. degrees from the University of Liverpool. She went from there to the Freshwater Biological Association, Far Sawrey working on various projects aimed at producing wartime food from fresh waters.

Following World War II, in 1945, Lowe-McConnell conducted a survey of tilapia fisheries in the southern part of Lake Nyasa, continuing the previous survey done in 1939 by Ethelwynn Trewavas, Kate Ricardo Bertram, and John Borley. Lowe-McConnell received no support from any fisheries research organisations for this survey and relied heavily on local fishermen for assistance with her research. As a result of these studies, Lowe-McConnell produced a valuable account of the tilapia fishery that formed a basis for subsequent investigation into Malawian cichlids. In the survey, Lowe-McConnell identified five tilapiine species, as well as studied other economically viable fish, including Labeo mesops.

In 1948, Lowe-McConnell studied as a Research Officer in the British Overseas Research Service on the Ugandan shores of Lake Victoria. Here, she helped found the East African Fisheries Research Organisation and briefly served as its Acting Director. Her research again focused again on tilapia as a potential fisheries species. During this time, she assisted many researchers, including Hugh Cott on his crocodile studies and Humphry Greenwood in his research on haplochromine cichlids. Lowe-McConnell's research during this period served as a foundation for later assessments of the impact fishing and other human activities have on food fishes.

After she married the geologist Richard McConnell on 31st of December 1953, she was required to resign from the British Colonial Service due to the organization's marriage bar. This rule prevented the permanent employment of a married woman in the British Public Service.

Soon after their wedding, the McConnells moved to the Bechuanaland Protectorate, where their joint research focused on Botswanan natural history. During this time, Lowe-McConnell was appointed as the ichthyologist on the R.V. Cape St Mary to conduct marine fieldwork on the unexplored Guiana shelf. She also developed her Okavango fish collection, now housed in the Natural History Museum, London. In 1955, she described four new species and subspecies of tilapias in Lake Jipe and the Pangani River.

In 1957, Richard became director of the Geological Survey in British Guiana and Lowe-McConnell provided research support. She was also hired by the Guiana Department of Agriculture and Fisheries to conduct fish surveys in unstudied areas, which provided a foundation for studying the diverse and ecologically complex Rupununi fish communities. Her 1959 paper on the differences between tilapia species served as the basis for Ethelwynn Trewavas' division of tilapiine fish genera.

When Richard retired in 1962, the McConnells moved back to England, where Lowe-McConnell joined the Natural History Museum, London as an Associate. While at the museum, Lowe-McConnell worked closely with Ethelwynn Trewavase on their extensive collections and global research. In 1968, Lowe-McConnell was appointed as ichthyologist on the Royal Society of London/Royal Geographical Society Xavantina Cachimbo Expedition to northeastern Mato Grosso, Brazil. She traveled to Gatun Lake in Panamá in 1979 to assist Thomas Zaret in studying the impact of an introduced cichla species.

Lowe-McConnell was widely known as a leader in her field and engaged with numerous international conferences, projects, and publications. Her work was requested by global organizations, including the Food and Agriculture Organization, United Nations Development Programme, and the International Center of Living Aquatic Resources Management. During the 1980s through the early 2000s, Lowe-McConnell worked with Great Lakes research projects and governance bodies, including the Lake Victoria Fisheries Organization.

In 1997, Lowe-McConnell was awarded the Linnean Medal of Zoology by the Linnean Society of London.

Lowe-McConnell continued to remain active in her field until her death on 22 December 2014 at St. George’s Park in Ditchling, England.

== Taxon described by her ==
- See Category:Taxa named by Rosemary Lowe-McConnell

== Legacy ==
The Pike Cichlid, Crenicichla rosemariae S. O. Kullander, 1997 is named after her.

== Selected publications ==
Lowe-McConnell was authored or co-author for over 80 publications and edited or co-edited three books.

- Notes on the fishes found in Georgetown fish markets and their seasonal fluctuations (1962)
- Man-made Lakes (1966)
- Speciation in tropical environments, with Ernst Mayr (1969)
- Fish communities in tropical freshwaters: their distribution, ecology and evolution (1975)
- Ecology of fishes in tropical waters (1977)
- The functioning of freshwater ecosystems, with E. D. Le Cren (1980)
- Ecological studies in tropical fish communities (1987)
- Symposium on Resource Use and Conservation of the African Great Lakes: Bujumbura 1989; with 18 tables (1992)
- Land of waters: explorations in the natural history of Guyana, South America (2000)
- Recent research in the African great lakes: fisheries, biodiversity and cichlid evolution (2003)
- The Tilapia Trail: The life story of a fish biologist (2006)
