= Haya people =

Bantu ethnic group of Tanzania

Haya
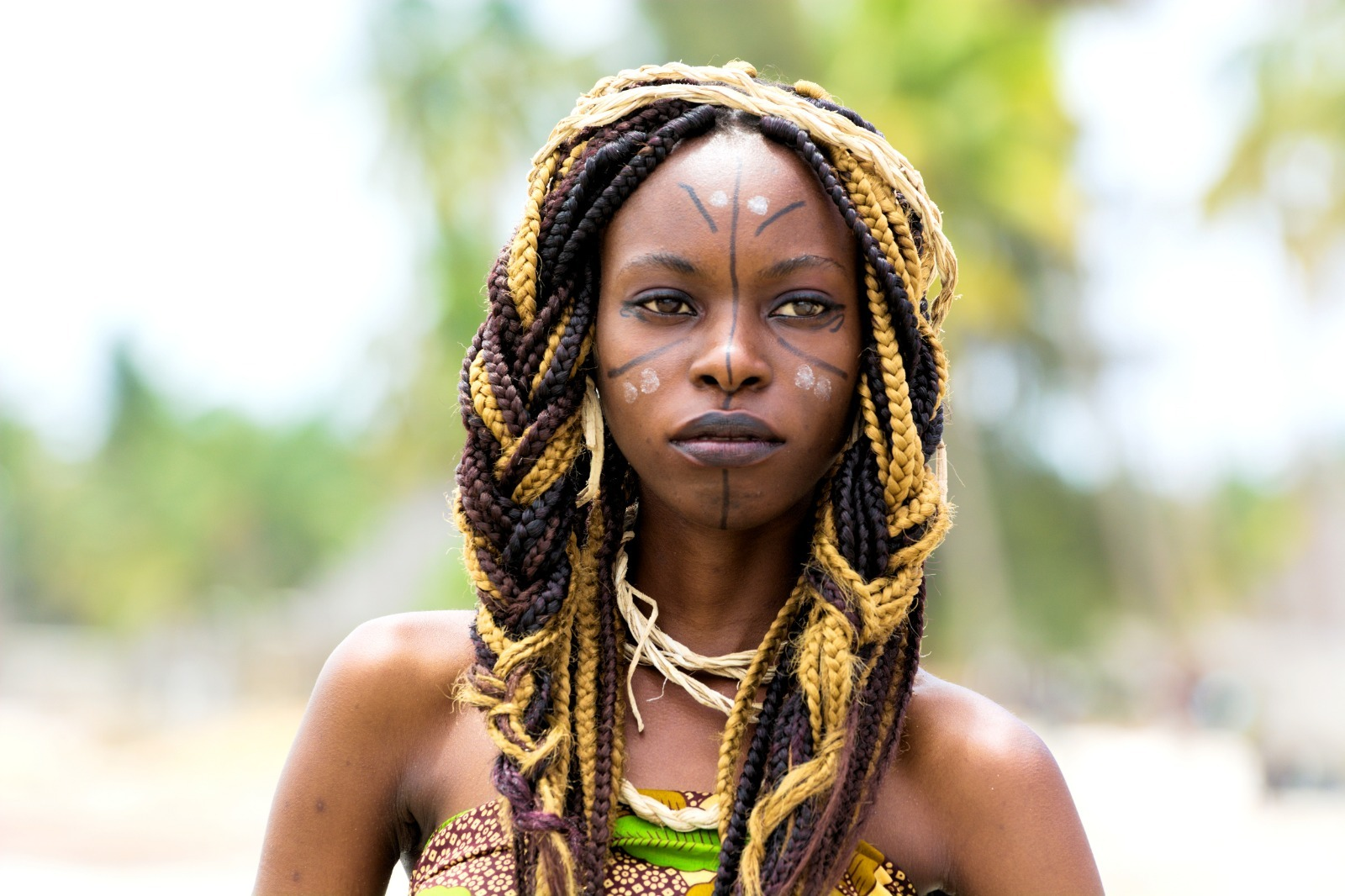

Total population
- 2,773,000

Regions with significant populations
- Tanzania

Languages
- Ruhaya

Religion
- Christianity, Islam, Haya religion

Related ethnic groups
- other Rutara people (BaNyambo, BanyaNkore, BaKiga, BaTooro, BaNyoro, BaHema, Baruuli and Bwisi people)

Haya
- Person: OmuHaya
- People: AbaHaya
- Language: OruHaya
- Country: BuHaya

Kagera Region, Tanzania

The Haya (or Bahaya; Swahili: Wahaya) are a Bantu ethnic group based in Kagera Region, northwestern Tanzania, on the western side of Lake Victoria. With over one million people, it is estimated that Haya make up approximately 4% of the population of Tanzania. Historically, the Haya have had a complex kingship-based political system. Agriculture, particularly banana farming, is central to Haya economic life. They are credited with the independent development of carbon steel dating to 2000 years ago using pre-heating techniques.

== Etymology ==
According to Hans Cory, the term Bahaya (Haya for fisher-people) was originally used to differentiate the Haya from the Banyambo of Karagwe. This distinction is said to be based on cultural differences, with the Haya economy predominantly oriented toward fishing and other industries on Lake Victoria and the Banyambo predominately engaged in pastoralism. Other sources on the origin of the term Haya cite oral accounts that state it derives from a goddess named Muhaya, whose father was King Ruhinda Mushure. This second version is not as popular.

== Haya history and kingdoms ==
=== Early history ===
Linguistic evidence indicates the Haya settled in the Kagera Region during the time of the Bantu expansion. They are believed to be some of the earliest inhabitants in the region to practice iron smelting and were part of the iron-making Urewe pottery culture (ancestral to many Eastern Bantu groups) dating from the 5th century BC to the 6th century AD. Around 200 BC is when the first strong evidence of Early Iron Age settlements were established along Lake Victoria in Buhaya. Iron tools may have helped expand agricultural production in the region which included a combination of cereal crop cultivation (finger millet and sorghum), root-cropping, and the gradual use of beans.

Between 800 and 1500 AD, Bahaya lifeways were greatly influenced by other Bantu peoples moving in from an area further north in the African Great Lakes region. These northern Bantu peoples, whose descendants founded the kingdoms of Bunyoro-Kitara and Buganda, are said to have brought with them new breeds of cattle as well as varieties of banana. It remains unclear as to why these peoples moved into the region but evidence indicates severe ecological change that facilitated the movement of people with specialized cattle herding practices for adapting to environmental stress. One of the main strategies for adapting to environmental stress included using cattle manure to maintain soil fertility for banana groves, a practice the Haya continue to this day but at a reduced level due to a decline in cattle holding that began after the 1890s rinderpest epizootic.

=== Kingdoms (16th to 18th centuries) ===
Prior to the establishment of Haya kingdoms, land tenure was controlled by corporate groups such as the clan. Religion played a prominent role in pre-dynastic social structure as well and included Bachwezi beliefs guided by practitioners (spirit mediums, diviners, priests and priestesses) capable of communicating with or channeling ancient Bacwezi gods and goddesses. Oral history indicates some clans founded Haya kingdoms beginning around the 16th century, such as the Bankango clan of Kyamtwara Kingdom and the Bakama clan of Kiziba Kingdom. The third Haya kingdom during this period was Ihangiro to the south of Kyamtwara. Oral accounts state that the Bahinda royal clan entered Kyamtwara Kingdom during the 17th century, coopting the Bayango clan and establishing their rule under King Rugomora Mahe. The Bahinda clan, who ruled Karagwe Kingdom to the west, trace their ancestry to the first king of Ankole, Ruhinda.

=== Kingdoms (19th century to 1963) ===
During the late 18th century, Kyamtwara Kingdom broke up due to revolts. Results of this breakup led to the founding of the kingdoms of Kihanja, Bukara, Lesser Kyamtwara and Bugabo. The outcome of this breakup divided leadership of the four new kingdoms between the Bahinda and the Bankango clans. The Bahinda ruled Kihanja and Bukara while Lesser Kyamtwara and Bugabo were ruled by the Bankango. According to accounts, the Bankango took the opportunity to overthrow the Bahinda who depended on their power. When the German colonial government established their rule in Tanganyika in the 1890s, there were six Haya kingdoms: Kiziba, Ihangiro, Kihanja, Bukara, Lesser Kyamtwara, and Bugabo. After the Anglo-German agreement of 1890, the kingdom of Mishenye, north of Kiziba Kingdom, was added, making the total number of Haya kingdoms seven. In 1963, the newly independent Tanzania government abolished all forms of traditional kingship and chieftainship in the country. Kings with the necessary qualifications were offered jobs by the new government. Five Haya kings took up the offer while the others remained honorary kings and continued to perform their traditional religious and ceremonial duties.

=== Uganda-Tanzania War ===
In 1978, the ancestral region to which the Haya belong was subject to an attempted annexation by the former Ugandan president Idi Amin Dada, whose invasion of the Kagera region in the Uganda-Tanzania War eventually led to the toppling of his government by the Army of Tanzania.

== Haya kingship ==
Haya kings (bakama) had absolute rule over their territory and assigned duties to specific clans. For example, in Kiziba Kingdom it is said the Batunda were royal bodyguards, the Bashonde royal brewers, and the Baihuzi royal cooks. Other duties assigned to clans were providing wives for the king, crushing rebellions, producing iron, and tending the royal cattle. These assigned duties sought to maintain structure in the kingdom. The administrative system of each kingdom was organized hierarchically with the king (mukama) at the top followed by the chief minister (omukuru we kibuga), ministers (batongole), council of advisers (lukiiko), county chiefs (bami b'enshozi), and village headmen (bakungu). These delegations were divided between two categories of authority: the princes (balangira) of royal descent and the king's non-royal followers (batekwa). During British colonial rule, the Ganda term katikiro replaced the Haya term omukuru we kibuga.

=== Omuteko ===
Future decisions for non-royal positions were guided by a training program called omuteko (age-set). This program required all boys between the ages of 10 and 12 to report to the king's capital for schooling and training. Selection was carried out by the village headman (mukungu) under the order of the king. Oral accounts describe how the initial training period lasted 10 days and included moral instruction on what was required of boys regarding their duties to the kingdom and their sub-county. After this initial period, boys were sent to the king's royal court for further training that included sports, games, dancing, and singing, all of which were competitive and consisted of each sub-county competing against the other. The best group remained at the court for additional training while the others were sent away for moral and physical training until called upon. Other schooling under omuteko included the art and science of war, history, and culture. Overall, omuteko was off and on, lasting roughly three years and establishing social cohesion among different sub-counties. Estimates indicate 50% of the boys taken in were dismissed after the initial training period. Those who excelled were provided specialized training in the courses they did well in.

Young women are said to have been called to the king's court as well under a program called buzana. This program, according to missionary accounts, was largely to appease the sexual appetites of the king.

=== War and ritual ===
Important decisions made by kings such as going to war or conducting a raid on a neighboring kingdom are said to have been made inside a divining house called a buchwankwanzi. Inside this structure, the king, along with his most trusted advisers, would base their decisions on what the diviner(s) foretold. The term buchwankwanzi is translated as "spitting pearls," which refers to the words of wisdom coming from mouths of those prophesying within. Along with military operations, kings were responsible for the fertility and prosperity of their kingdom such as good crops, healthy livestock, good hunting and fishing, and a productive economy. Some of the most important rituals to ensure these conditions were the new moon ceremonies conducted by the king each month and overseen by religious specialists. These ceremonies involved feasting, consumption of alcohol, offerings to gods and goddesses, and the use of a deceased king's regalia as ritual catalysts. The new moon ceremonies also required kings to visit sacred centers throughout their kingdom with offerings to ancient Bacwezi gods and goddesses believed to be capable of bringing prosperity, fertility, famine, and disease.

=== Death and renewal ===
The death of a king brought about a mourning period that required everyone in the kingdom to cease all labor until a new king was installed. Anyone caught breaking this temporary ordinance would be punished. The installment of a new king was not always a smooth transition. Oral histories recount how factions among the royal clan and the court often delayed the installment of a new king, including the king's family as siblings schemed as well as fought one another over the vacant throne. Two of the most sacred objects to successfully secure the throne were the royal drums of the kingdom, closely protected by the clan given charge over them, and the jawbone of the deceased king which required special burial, accompanied by rituals, on his royal burial estate (gashani) within his royal compound (kikale). The former king's regalia and ritual paraphernalia would be amassed and curated in his buchwankwanzi house. Newly elected kings would undergo the rituals of accession and, upon the completion these rituals, the temporary ordinance prohibiting labor would be lifted, bringing order back to the kingdom.

== Arab trade and European contact ==
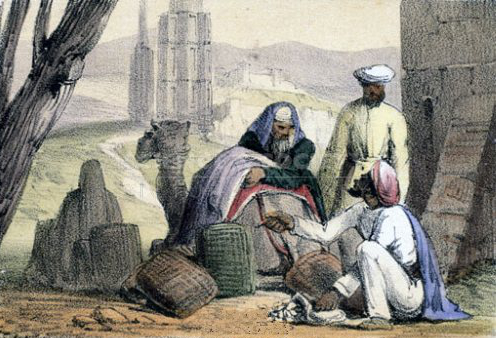
1845 print showing cowry shells being used as currency by an Arab trader

By the mid-19th century the Haya were linked into Arab, Swahili, Nyamwezi, and Sumbwa trade networks. It is unclear when the first Arabs arrived in Buhaya but records indicate the first Arab to visit Buganda was Ahmed bin Ibrahim in 1841, who later visited Karagwe Kingdom and built a residence at Kafuro a few miles east from the kingdom's capital, Bweranyange. By and large, the Arabs were most interested in acquiring ivory and slaves. Goods brought in for exchange included copper coils, cloth, salt, trade beads, Chinese porcelain, and cowrie shells. The introduction of cowrie shells (ensimbi) purportedly displaced the traditional Haya barter system, becoming a form of currency as well as an object used in rituals. Compared to Buhaya kingdoms, Karagwe Kingdom had stronger links to Arab trade networks, with notable trade depots in Kafuro and Kitengure. The presence of Arab traders at Kafuo was, however, short-lived after locals murdered Ahmed bin Ibrahim for his alleged meddling in internal power dynamics following the death of King Rumanyika I of Karagwe.

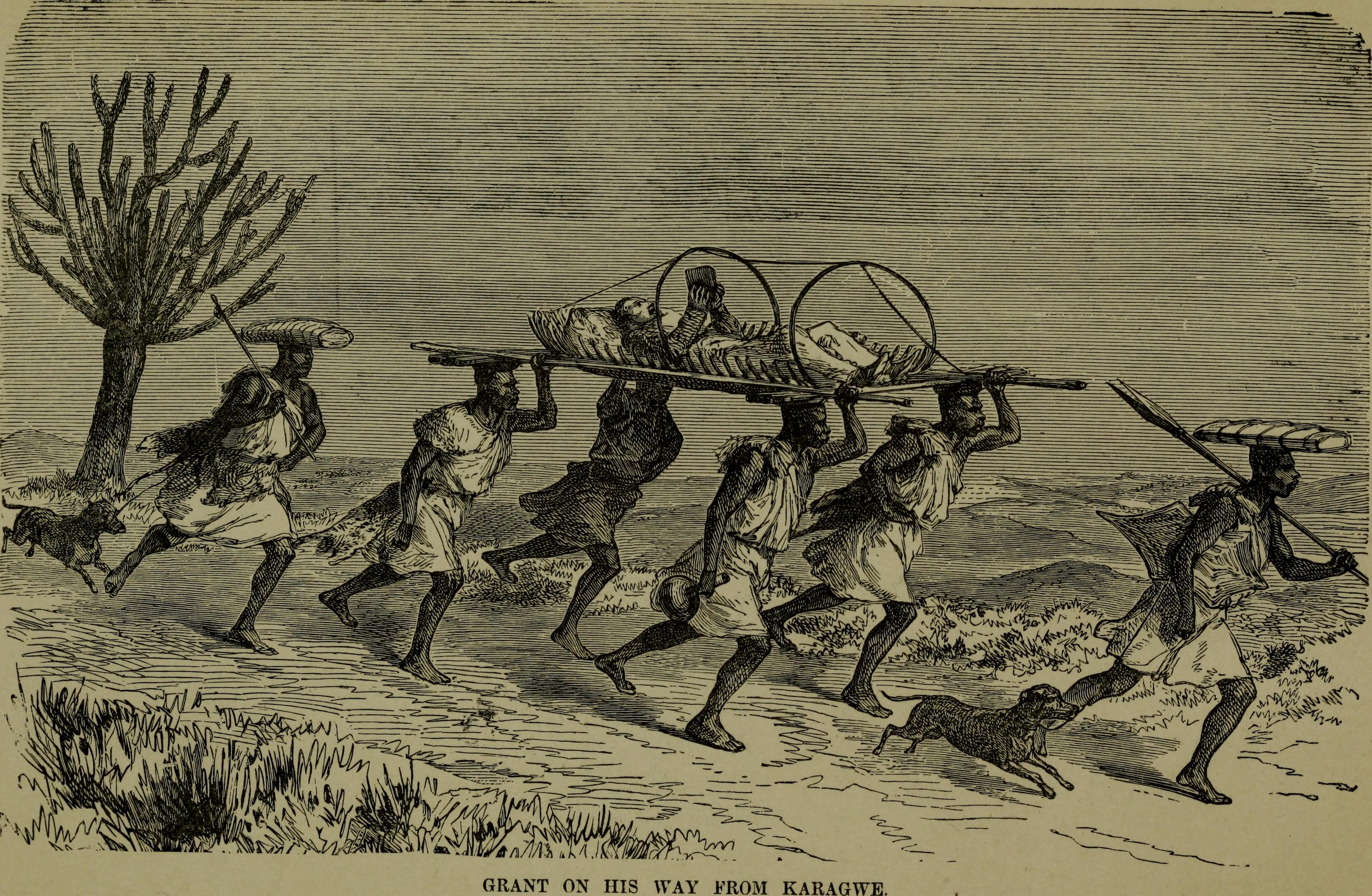
James A. Grant on his way from Karagwe

The first Europeans to pass through Kagera Region were John H. Speke and James A. Grant during their 1860–1861 expedition in search for the source of the Nile. Their expedition, sponsored by the Royal Geographical Society, started in Zanzibar in October 1860 and took them across the mainland where they arrived in Karagwe in November 1861. It is said that upon their arrival in Karagwe, King Rumanyika I consulted his spiritual advisers and, after clearing Speke and Grant of any threat, waived the entry fee (hongo) typically required foreigners, going so far as to refer to Speke and Grant as his guests. Speke's journal talks kindly of King Rumanyka's hospitality. Speke left Karagwe for Buganda in January 1862 while Grant, forced to remain due to a swollen foot, did not depart until April. The next European to visit the region was Welsh journalist Henry Morton Stanley in 1874. Stanley's expedition, subsidized by the New York Herald and The Daily Telegraph, was to continue mapping the region's lakes and rivers initiated by Speke and Grant. During his travels through the Kingdom of Ihangiro, Stanley's party engaged in a small skirmish with King Ntare II over their passage through his territory. Stanley's party, setting up camp on Bumbire Island, negotiated with King Ntare II and secured passage north through to Karagwe on their way to Buganda. Overall, European interests in Haya kingdoms during this period were of marginal interest compared to Karagwe and Buganda.

== European colonialism in Buhaya ==
Compared to Buhaya kingdoms, Karagwe Kingdom was more powerful. However, internal power struggles following the death of King Rumanyika I in 1881 destabilized the kingdom and, with the 1890s rinderpest epizootic killing upwards of 90% of Karagwe's cattle population, the kingdom went into a decline from which it was never able to fully recover. It was around this time the Germans entered the region, whose interests were piqued due to news reports from Speke, Grant, and Stanley's travels. Rather than establish a colonial government, the Germans chose to have a privately sponsored colonialist company, the Society for German Colonization. This society, founded by Carl Peters in 1885, put the Germans in competition with the British presence in Eastern Africa.

=== German colonialism (1890–1919) ===
Following the Anglo-German Agreement of 1890, a boundary was drawn between British and German territories along the west side of Lake Victoria. This line placed Buganda under British influence and Buhaya under German influence. In 1902, the southern portion of Buganda known as Missenye was ceded, becoming its own separate kingdom under German rule. The Germans referred to Kagera Region as Zwischenseengebiet (inter-lake area) and included Rwanda and Burundi.

In November 1890, the Germans arrived in Bukoba under the command of Emin Pasha. Pasha, with a contingent of around 40 soldiers, established a German boma in Bukoba which at the time was a swamp of uninhabited lower-lands along the shore of Lake Victoria. In addition to establishing a boma, Pasha drew up treaties to submit to Haya kings and recognized chiefs in the region before the arrival of his successor Lieutenant Wilhelm Langheld. Under Langheld's leadership, Haya kingdoms were ruled indirectly.

The Haya referred to Langheld as "Bwana Mzuri" (Mr. Good) not because he was considered a good person but rather due to his overuse of the Swahili word mzuri (good) in his speeches. Langheld's method to keep Haya kings under German control was, in his own words, to "play one off against the other." His successor, Lieutenant Carl Herrmann, was no different regarding the use of diplomatic manipulation to keep Haya kingdoms under German control. Along with the arrival of Herrmann was Lieutenant Franz Richter − the Haya referred to Richter as a Hauptmann (Captain), and his nickname was "Bwana Korongo" (Mr. Crane or Stork). During the latter part of Richter's command (ca. 1898–1902) he, along with a contingent of askaris and Bahamba (citizens of Kihanja) under the leadership of King Kahigi II, murdered hundreds of Haya from Bukara Kingdom. The event, referred to as the Ngogo massacre, is said to have occurred after Richter became irritated during a confrontation with a gathering of Bakara along the Ngogo River. Richter, who had a heavy hand in Haya affairs through military force and intimidation, has also been implicated in the massacre of 200 people in 1907 during the Maji Maji Rebellion.

With the arrival of the Europeans and Christianity the region became famous for yielding the first African Roman Catholic Cardinal the late Cardinal Laurean Rugambwa; they also adopted the European style of formal education earlier when compared to other nearby tribes.

== Archaeological discoveries and iron technology ==
Archaeologist Peter R. Schmidt discovered evidence through a combination of archaeology and oral tradition that the Haya had been smelting iron ore to make carbon steel for around 2300–2000 years. This discovery happened when Schmidt was working at the village of Kataruka. Elders at Kataruka informed Schmidt that their ancestors had smelted iron underneath a sacred shrine tree called Kaiija ("the place of the forge"). Curious to verify their own history, elders asked Schmidt to conduct an excavation underneath the sacred shrine tree. Results of this excavation led to the discovery of an iron furnace carbon-dated to the 1st millennium BC.

In the 1970s and 1980s, Schmidt documented a series of experimental smelts to understand social, cultural, and technological processes of past Haya iron making. A challenge at the time was that the Haya had abandoned iron smelting due to the introduction of cheap steel from foreign sources. Haya familiar with iron smelting practices were later tasked with recreating an iron furnace. This included gathering and preparing necessary materials such as iron ore, charcoal, clay to make tuyeres, and grasses. Haya participating in these experiments were able to create a furnace and produce iron of similar quality as those found at Iron Age sites in the region, such as KM2 and KM3. Iron smelting documented during these experiments were similar to open hearth furnace steel making developed in Europe during the 19th century. These experiments led Schmidt to forward his "preheating hypothesis." This hypothesis proposes that preheating was a critical component to Early Iron Age technologies in the region, allowing temperatures inside a furnace to reach 1300 to 1400 °C. During a 1976 experimental smelt, the preheating hypothesis was confirmed. This hypothesis was challenged by David Killick and defended by Schmidt and archaeologist Donald Avery in response to Killick's critique. Schmidt's preheating hypothesis was also tested and again supported by S. Terry Childs in 1996.

Pollen core samples in the region document the loss of forested habitats and the expansion of grasslands beginning around the 2nd millennium BC and continuing up to the 11th century AD. It is argued that part of the advancement of grasslands in Kagera Region was due to iron smelting as it required the production of charcoal on a large scale. By 1500 AD, Haya iron smelters introduced the use of Miscanthidium grass (M. grass). As a fast-growing renewable resource, M. grass reduced the need for charcoal. Furthermore, its use allows for a larger carbon contact surface with iron ore inside a furnace, creating a better smelting environment.

== Culture ==
Traditionally, the Haya are a patrilineal society structured around a clan system (oluganda) with a common, it is among the few early civilized tribes in Tanzania and east Africa due to the fact that haya adopted western culture and social aspect of westen than other tribes, and are considered as highly educated tribe in Tanzania. totem All members of high tribe collectively identify with. Totems are typically an animal, and each clan has proscriptions such as not eating their totem or causing it harm. Haya who continue to practice this tradition believe that anyone who harms or consumes their totem will bring affliction to themselves as well as their family. Moreover, each male head of the household manages a shrine (ekikalo) dedicated to his ancestors. These family shrines are regularly provided offerings such as banana beer (orubisi), unripe bananas, and dried coffee beans to appease ancestral spirits.

=== Mushonge ===
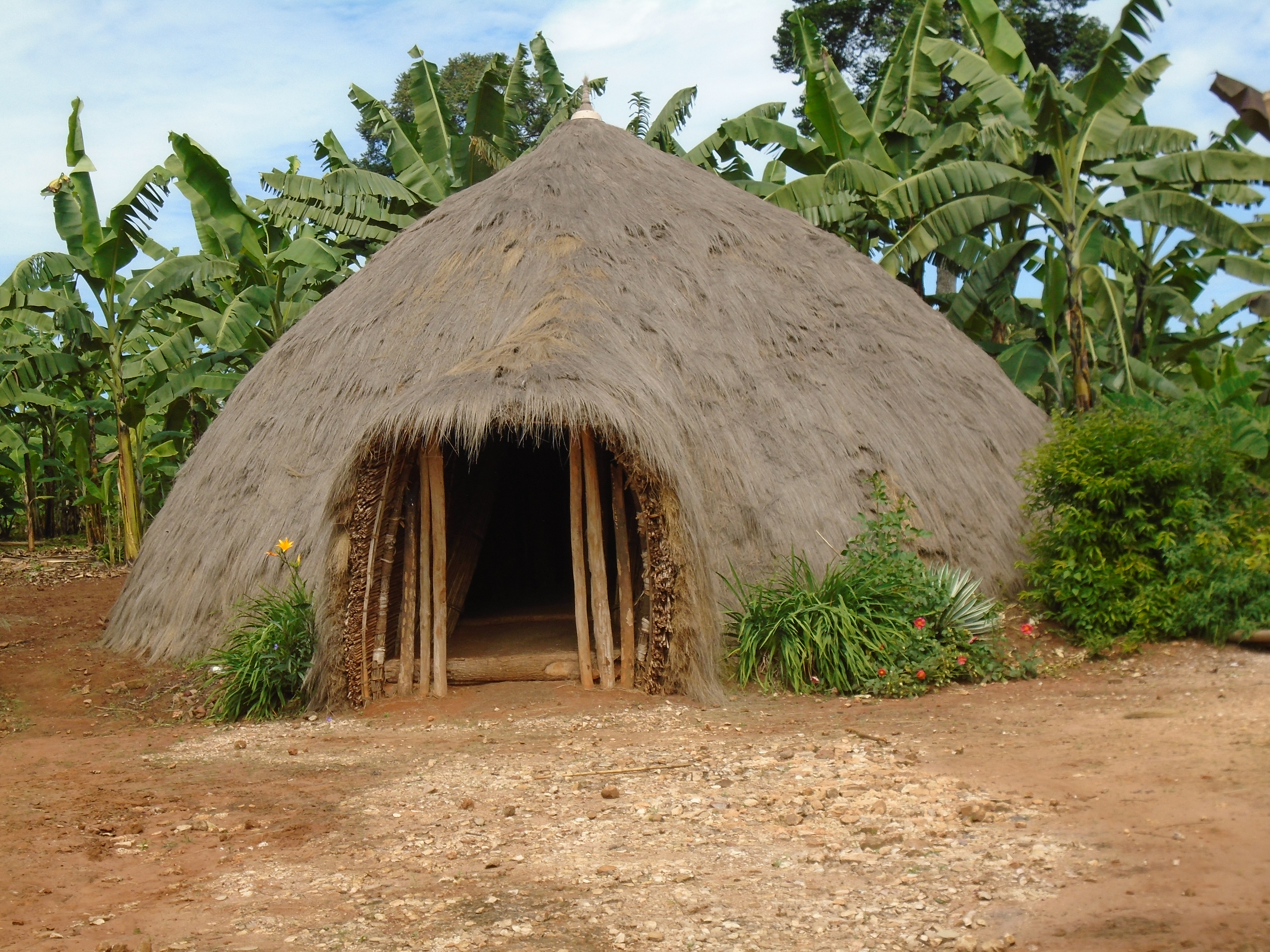
Mushonge Museum on the Kamachumu Plateau, Kagera Region, Tanzania

The traditional Haya house is called a mushonge. Made out of flexible reeds, wooden poles, banana fiber, and grass, mushonge are built from the top down and are circular in shape with a conical peak. The word mushonge comes from the Haya term mushongole, translated as someone who is wealthy, powerful, and respected. Construction of a mushonge includes the performance of rituals as well as the consumption of alcohol during and after its completion. The spatial arrangement of each mushonge is defined by wooden poles for structural support and include sections for men and women, corralling animals, and shrines honoring ancestors. It is said the size of the mushonge reflected the social hierarchy of the village, with the chief's being the largest followed by religious authorities, clan leaders, sub-clan leaders, and common people. Haya kings often moved throughout their kingdom and lived in a similar structure called a nyaruju (palace). The mushonge gradually shifted to a mud walled design (kiteti) and then a mudbrick design (banda). Today, most Haya live in square houses with a corrugated iron sheet roof. Reasons for the shift from vernacular architecture to a modern design vary and include the issue of space as land was further divided up among the family, Tanzania policies under ujamaa aimed a rural development, and Christian values that viewed the vernacular design as backwards, including its symbolic components that reflect traditional Haya religion.

=== Agriculture and foodways ===
Productive soils for raising crops have been a challenge for the Haya due to rainfall leaching nutrients from the soil and the landscapes physical makeup, notably along the coast of Lake Victoria, which provides only patches of fertile soil. To overcome these challenges, the Haya practice mixed farming framed around three types of land: the banana grove (kibanja) surrounding the homestead, tended to all year round as bananas are a perennial plant; family plots (musiri) for supplementary foods such as maize, cassava, sweet potatoes, and other staple foods; and communal grasslands (rweya) for animal grazing and grass cutting for various uses such as mulching, thatching, and flooring. Forested areas are used as well and include harvesting wood for building materials and charcoal to cook food.

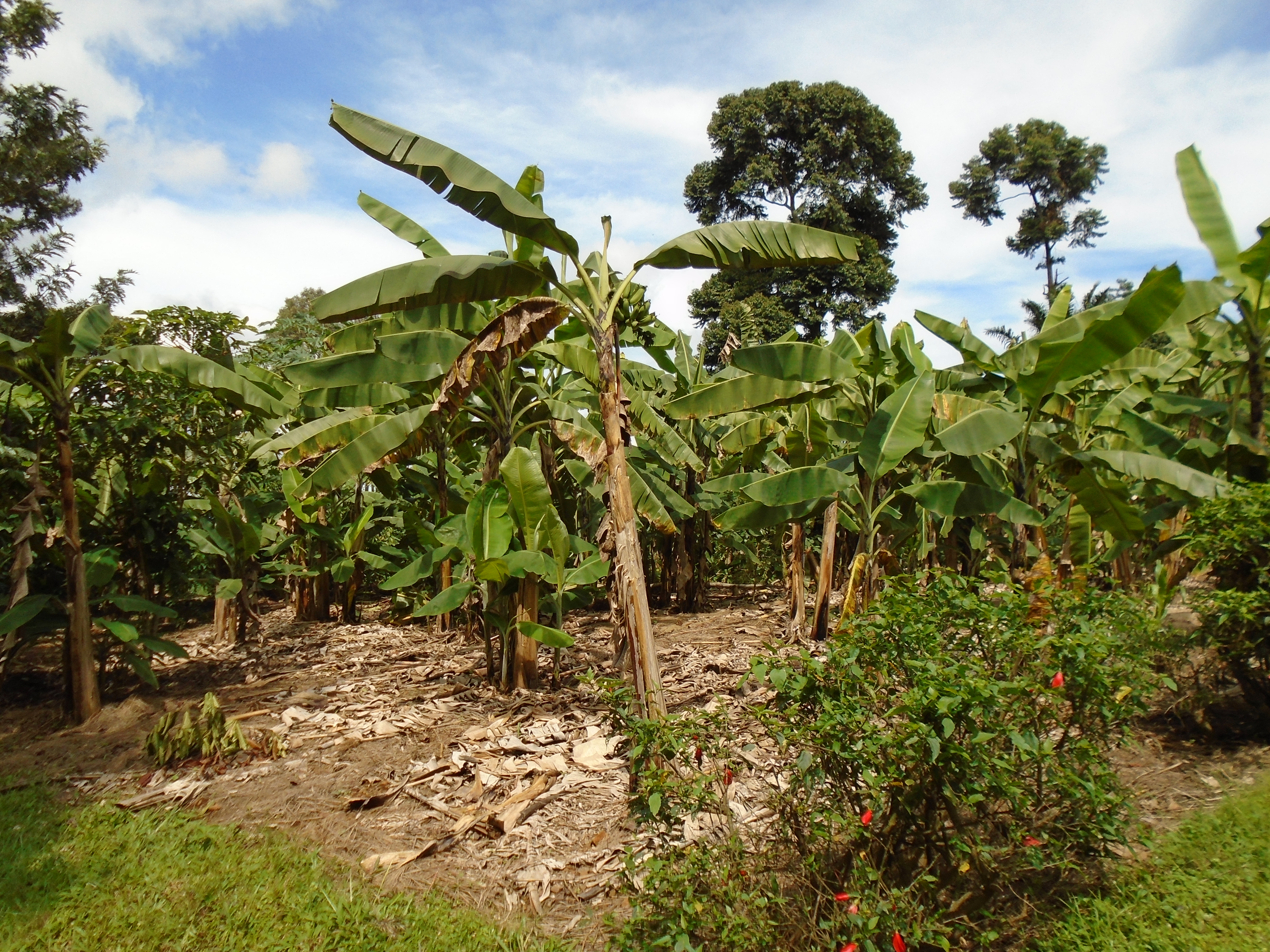
Haya kibanja, Bukoba, Tanzania

The kibanja (plural bibanja) is the most important when it comes to Haya foodways. Kagera Region is said to produce nearly half of Tanzania's banana production with the cooking banana (matoke) making up the majority of the banana yield. The popular food dish matoke includes beans with either beef or fish, and it is seen as a fulfilling meal compared to only consuming crops like maize and cassava. Other varieties of banana include those for making beer (orubisi) and spirits (konyagi) as well as non-cooking types considered to be sweet. Beyond food and nutrition, banana use among the Haya includes their ritual use as offerings to ancestors as well as a ritual called koshobekera believed to assist in a child's growth. Raised alongside bananas are coffee shrubs, a once prosperous cash crop for the Haya until market influences coupled with El Niño rains from 1998 to 2000, followed by a severe drought, destroyed much of the crop. Rather than roast and brew coffee for drinking, the Haya sun-dry the beans and chew on them. Coffee beans are often provide for guests visiting the homestead and, traditionally, they are left as offerings to ancestors at shrines and, in the past, were used to seal blood-pacts by splitting a single bean in half, cutting one's navel, smearing blood onto the half-bean, and placing the bean in the other participant's mouth.

The shortage of cattle manure and other types of agricultural fertilizer has greatly impacted banana production among the Haya. Moreover, the spread of Banana Xanthomonas Wilt (BXW) into the region around 2006 is changing the kibanja way of life, leading to a greater reliance on other crops such as cassava and maize. Another concern cited is the growing youth population in the region and its impact on land inheritance as fathers divide their landholdings to such a degree that kibanja plots are too small to produce enough bananas to feed new families, leading more Haya to orient their efforts to developing communal grasslands (rewya). Communal grasslands include harvesting edible grasshoppers (nsenene) when they are in season. Traditionally, Haya women were required to harvest these grasshoppers by hand, storing captured grasshoppers in a woven basket, and roast them for men to consume. It was considered taboo for women to eat nsenene. Today, this taboo is not followed and Haya men and women consume them. Along with the Haya, other cultural groups in southwestern Uganda harvest nsenene for food as well as income.

=== Health and medicine ===
The Haya have a rich array of traditional medicines for treating sickness and disease. Research on Haya ethnomedicine documents the use of dozens of plant species for treating a range of health issues from malaria, skin conditions, infections and wounds, gastrointestinal disorders, and gynecological problems. Prior to modern medicine, Haya health issues were brought to the attention of traditional doctors (often diviners or priests) skilled in medicine and identifying sicknesses. Today, it is not uncommon for a Haya person to seek the services of both a traditional doctor as well as trained medical specialists working at local dispensaries and clinics.

Historically, Kagera Region had the first documented case of HIV/AIDS in Tanzania. Described as a region hit hard by the HIV/AIDS epidemic, Kagera Region has an extensive history of HIV/AIDS research, ranging from statistics on reported cases, how families cope with infected loved ones, gender disparities, and the loss of traditional knowledge due to elders suffering from the virus passing away before they can transmit their wisdom to the next generation.

=== Arts ===
Traditional Haya dance, filmed by Evan Poncian

In the area covering the present day Muleba, Bukoba Urban, Bukoba Rural, and Missenyi, as is the case in other areas where Buhaya culture is predominant in the Kagera Region in Tanzania, musical performances – singing, dancing, and playing of musical instruments – are integral parts of everyday life. As is the case in many African societies, among the Haya musical performances are inseparable from the daily events and the social, political and cultural life of the community. Traditionally, events such as marriage, funerals, worship, installation, praise, and exaltation of kings (omukama), celebratory war dances (omutoro) and heroic recitations or self-praise recitations (ebyebugo), healing practices such as cleansing and chasing away evil spirits, and all occasions calling for celebration produced performances. In 1952 world-renowned ethnomusicologist, Hugh Tracey, recorded songs of the Haya people. These songs are preserved by the International Library of African Music. A sample of one of these songs include the use of enkoito drum rhythms.

== Notable people ==
- Francis Xavier Rwamugira
- Laurean Rugambwa
- Josiah Kibira
- Fredrick Rwegarulila
- Justinian Rweyemamu
- Josaphat Kanywanyi
- Hubert Kairuki
- Adolph Mulokozi
- Sebastian Kinyondo
- Mwesiga Baregu
- Winceslaus Kilama
- Anna Tibaijuka
- Silas Lwakabamba
- William Rugumamu
- Rwekaza Mukandala
- Nelson Ijumba
- Beda Mutagahywa
- James Rugemalila
- John Byombalirwa
- Ali Mufuruki
- Novatus Rugambwa
- Protase Rugambwa
- Bashiru Ally
- Ruge Mutahaba
- Godfrey (MC Gara B) Rugarabamu
- Saida Karoli
- Maxmillian Bushoke

== See also ==
Haya language
