= Bweranyange =

National Historic Site of Tanzania

- Location within Tanzania
- 1°45′47.52″S 30°52′29.28″E
- Type: Settlement
- Cultures: Nyambo
- Location: Karagwe District, Kagera Region, Tanzania

History
- Built: 19th century CE

Site notes
- Condition: Endangered
- Owner: Tanzanian Government
- Management: Antiquities Division, Ministry of Natural Resources and Tourism

National Historic Sites of Tanzania
- Official name: Bweranyange Historic Settlement
- Type: Cultural

Bweranyange (Mji wa kale wa Bweranyange in Swahili) is a historic settlement located inside the Karagwe District of the Kagera Region in Tanzania. The settlement was established as the capital of the Karagwe Kingdom. The site is a registered National Historic Site.
