= Kingdom of Karagwe =

Historical Bantu state in Tanzania

Kingdom of Karagwe Ufalme wa Ukaragwe (Swahili)
- c.1450–6 December 1963
- Capital: Bweranyange
- Official languages: Nyambo
- Common languages: Nyambo & Swahili
- Religion: African traditional religions
- Demonym: Karagwean
- Government: Monarchy
- King
  - First: Ruhinda I
  - Last: Ruhinda VII
- History
  - Established: c.1450
  - Disestablished: 6 December 1963
- Currency: barter
- Today part of: Tanzania

The Kingdom of Karagwe (Ufalme wa Karagwe, in Swahili) was a historical Bantu state in present-day Karagwe District of the Kagera Region in northwestern Tanzania, between Rwanda and Lake Victoria. East Africa's influential Karagwe Kingdom was ruled by a hereditary monarchs who were reputed to be Bachwezi descendants. By the end of the 20th century, it had thriving trade with traders from all parts of East Africa, especially slave-trading Arabs. Bweranyange served as the Karagwe kingdom's capital.

== Origins ==
The Karagwe kingdom was part of the many Great Lakes Kingdoms in East Africa. The kingdom reached its apex during the 19th century. The growth occurred during the early part of the 1800s with King Ndagara who came to power around 1820 and ruled until 1853 at which time he was replaced by King Rumanika.

However, the ruler of the most northern Haya Kingdom, Kiziba, belonged to a rival clan, the Bito, which also ruled Bunyoro to the north. Their legends claimed that a hero by the name of Ruhinda had created a single kingdom in the area and that his descendants, the Hinda clan, ruled the successor chiefdoms. The pastoralists, known as Hima, had a distinct social supremacy in these kingdoms, particularly in Karagwe. This may have been due to their ability to convert cultivators into clients by lending livestock.

Both classes of men, outlawing clan-to-clan blood feuds, appointing royal relatives as sub-chiefs and village headmen who resided on nyarubanja estates, waging a protracted and largely successful battle to control the Kubandwa cult mediums who predominated local religion, and setting up elaborate courts where each clan served a specific purpose. In contrast to Ufipa, the villagers of Karagwe did not even choose their headmen or distribute land. The misery of its cultivators moved a number of the country's early visitors because it was Tanganyika's most hierarchical and repressive society.

The interlacustrine territory had been ruled by Bunyoro up until the end of the eighteenth century, but Karagwe drove out a Nyoro force, whose monarch became known as Ntare the Nyoro-slayer. Lacking Nyoro's protection, the Bito kingdom of Kiziba turned to Buganda for assistance in fighting its Hinda neighbors.

By 1800, the Baganda had assassinated the Hinda king of Kyamutwara at his court, and the Kingdom had been divided into four parts, with the Hinda ruling over Kianja and Bukara and the Hima-dominated Nkango ruling over Bugabo and Lesser Kyamutwara. Shortly after, the Ganda interfered in Karagwe and Ihangiro, another realm of the Hinda. The Tutsi rulers of Buha had thrived in the eighteenth century but were now threatened by the rise of Burundi, which would annex significant portions of Buha in the early nineteenth century. This threat was felt further south as well.

== Economy ==
During the height of the Karagwe kingdom agriculture played an important role in local economics. Many Karagwe were cattle herders and so cows were a measure of wealth and power. Iron production also played a key part in the economic balances within the kingdom. The location of Karagwe land in what is today north-western Tanzania allowed them to participate in regional trade routes that connected Buganda and other the Ugandan and Rwandan states and merchants from the Eastern coast and the rest of eastern Africa.

== Banyambo people ==
Tanzania's Banyambo ethnic group is descended from the Karagwe Kingdom. They are mostly found in the northwestern Kagera and Kigoma regions. Like many other Bantu peoples, the Banyambo live off the land. The Haya people are thought to be separate from them. The economic orientation of the Haya toward fishing and agriculture and the Banyambo toward pastoralism are thought to be the reasons for this differentiation.

== Art ==
The most famous works of art from the Karagwe kingdom are iron objects. Some are utilitarian, while others are thought to be symbolic cows and hammers which were used symbolically to link the king with iron production.

== Dynasty and decline ==
A line of Kings who are claimed to have been from the Bachwezi and Babiito clans ruled Karagwe. According to legend, Ruhinda—a son of Njunaki, a son of Igaba, and a grandson of Wamalaa—founded the empire.

King Rumanyika Orugundu I, who ruled from 1855 to 1882, led the Karagwe kingdom to its apex in the 19th century. In his honor, the park was previously designated as Rumanyika Orugundu Game Reserve. When all old kingdoms were abolished countrywide by Nyerere in favor of African socialism between 1962/1963, the Karagwe Kingdom, which had been founded around 1450, came to an end.

=== List of rulers ===
- Ruhinda Kizarabagabe (c. 1450–1490)
- Ntare I (c. 1490–1520)
- Ruhinda II (c. 1520–1550)
- Ntare II (c. 1550–1575)
- Ruhinda III (c. 1575–1595)
- Ntare III (c. 1595–1620)
- Ruhinda IV (c. 1620–1645)
- Ntare IV (c. 1645–1675)
- Ruhinda V (c. 1675–1700)
- Rusatira (c. 1700–1725)
- Mehiga (c. 1725–1750)
- Kalemera Bwirangenda (c. 1750–1774)
- Ntare V Kiitabanyoro (c. 1774–1794)
- Ruhinda VI Orushongo (c. 1794–1819)
- Ndagara I (c. 1819–1853)
- Rumanyika (1853–1883)
- Kayenje Kalemera II (1883–1886)
- Nyamukuba Ndagara (1886–1893)
- Kanyorozi Ntare VI (1893–1916)
- Rumanyika II (1916–1939)
- Ruhinda VII (1939–1963)

== Legacy ==
Rumanyika-Karagwe National Park was named in honor of King Rumanyika Orugundu I, one of the most prominent Karagwe kings.

== See also ==
List of kings of Karagwe
