= Altezza Travel =

Tanzanian tourism company

- Type: Private
- Industry: Tourism
- Founded: 14 April 2014
- Headquarters: Nshara village, Kilimanjaro, Tanzania
- Number of employees: 250+
- Website: altezzatravel.com

Altezza Travel (founded 2014) is a Tanzanian ecotourism company specialising in Mount Kilimanjaro climbing expeditions and safaris in northern Tanzania. The company is based in Nshara village in the Hai District, Kilimanjaro Region.

== History ==
Altezza Travel was founded on 14 April 2014 in Moshi, but in 2016 it moved operations to Nshara village. The company offers guided ascents of Mount Kilimanjaro and organises wildlife safaris to the Serengeti, the Ngorongoro Conservation Area, and Tarangire National Park in Tanzania.

In February 2015, Russian Red Bull athlete Valerii Rozov performed the first wingsuit BASE jump from Mount Kilimanjaro, launching from the Western Breach Wall at approximately 5,460 metres. After spending over a minute in freefall, Rozov covered a horizontal distance of nearly three kilometres and landed at Barranco Camp. The expedition was organised by Red Bull in cooperation with Altezza Travel.

In June 2016, Swiss alpinist Stephan Siegrist, a Mammut Pro Team athlete, while taking part in the company's expedition, set a world record for the highest highline walk by crossing a 20-metre line between two rock towers at 5,700 metres on Kilimanjaro. The previous record of 5,322 metres had been set in Ladakh, India, in 2015.

In 2022, Lonely Planet listed Altezza Travel among recommended outfitters for hikes and climbs in Tanzania.

In February 2025, the Tanzania Revenue Authority recognised Altezza Travel as the largest taxpayer in the Kilimanjaro Region at a Taxpayer Appreciation Day ceremony in Moshi. The company obtained certification as a B Corporation later that year. In October 2025, the International Climbing and Mountaineering Federation (UIAA) announced a two-year sustainability partnership with Altezza Travel, covering the federation's Mountain Protection Award and Climate Action Plans.

As of 2025, the company employs over 250 people in the Kilimanjaro region.

== Research and conservation ==
=== Discovery of the highest-living frog in Africa ===
In June 2024, members of the Altezza Travel team observed a frog at an altitude of approximately 4,000 metres on Mount Kilimanjaro during a routine ascent. The sighting was unusual because no amphibian species had been previously documented above 3,000 metres in Africa. The observation was reported to the Tanzania Wildlife Research Institute, which initiated a research collaboration.

In February 2025, a joint expedition comprising TAWIRI researchers, Altezza Travel guides, and Professor Alan Channing,a herpetologist from the University of the Western Cape and author of Amphibians of Central and Southern Africa, surveyed four streams on Kilimanjaro's western slope at altitudes between 3,600 and 4,100 metres. Over five days, the team located several frog populations in alpine pools and collected DNA samples.

Laboratory analysis identified the frogs as Amietia wittei (Witte's River Frog), a species previously known from high plateaus in Kenya and Uganda but not documented at such elevations. The discovery extended the species' known altitudinal range by approximately 1,000 metres, making it the highest-recorded frog population on the African continent.

=== Wildlife monitoring ===
Altezza Travel has collaborated with the Tanzania National Parks Authority (TANAPA) on wildlife monitoring in northern Tanzania, providing GPS collaring equipment for tracking African wild dogs in Tarangire National Park.

In June 2024, the Chief Park Warden of Mount Kilimanjaro National Park, Angela Nyaki, stated that the company had provided six containers of fire-safety equipment to the park.

=== Ethics guide ===
The company has been cited as the publisher of an ethics guide related to Mount Kilimanjaro tourism practices, addressing standards for porter welfare and environmental management on the mountain.

=== Women-only expeditions ===
In December 2025, Altezza Travel launched women-only Mount Kilimanjaro climbing expeditions, with both the crew and clients consisting solely of women.

== Recognition ==
At the World Travel Awards, Altezza Travel was named Tanzania's Leading Tour Operator in 2024 and 2025. At the inaugural Serengeti Awards, organised by Tanzania's Ministry of Natural Resources and Tourism, the company received the award for Best Tour Operator in the Northern Tourism Zone.
