= Rumanyika-Karagwe National Park =

Protected area in Tanzania

- IUCN category II (national park)
- Location within Tanzania
- Location: Kyerwa District & Karagwe District, of Kagera Region; Tanzania
- Nearest city: Bukoba
- Coordinates: 1°11′27.6″S 30°46′32.88″E
- Area: 247 km^{2} (95 mi^{2})
- Designation: National Park
- Established: 2019
- Named for: King Rumanyika I Orugundu of Karagwe Kingdom
- Governing body: Tanzania National Parks Authority under the Ministry of Natural Resources and Tourism
- Website: Official Page

The Rumanyika-Karagwe National Park (Hifadhi ya Taifa ya Rumanuyika-Karagwe, In Swahili) is a Tanzanian national park located in the Karagwe, Kyerwa District of Kagera Region. The national park covers an area of The 247 km2, which is named after the Karagwe kingdom that peaked in the 19th century under the leadership of King Rumanyika I Orugundu, who ruled from 1855 to 1882. The Park was once gazetted as Rumanyika Orugundu Game Reserve in his honor.

== Attractions ==
Home to savannah wildlife like giraffes, buffalo, impala, waterbuck, leopards, zebras, bushbuck, and baboons in the north western corner of Tanzania makes Rumanyika-Karagwe National Park unique.
