= Kyerwa District =

District of Kagera Region, Tanzania

Kyerwa District Wilaya ya Kyerwa
- District
- Kyerwa District of Kagera Region
- Coordinates: 1.260278°S 30.795556°E
- Country: Tanzania
- Region: Kagera Region

Government
  - Type: Council
  - Body: Kyerwa District Council
  - District Commissioner: Zaituni Msofe
  - District Secretary: Muss Waziri
  - Chairman of Council: Bahati Henerico Lekayo

Area
  - Total: 2,575 km^{2} (994 sq mi)
- Elevation: 1,500 m (4,900 ft)

Population (2022)
  - Total: 412,910
  - Density: 160.4/km^{2} (415.3/sq mi)
- Website: District website

Kyerwa District is one of the eight districts of the Kagera Region of Tanzania. It is one of the 20 new districts formed in Tanzania since 2010; it was split off from Karagwe District. It is bordered to the north by Uganda, to the east by Missenyi District, to the south by Karagwe District and to the west by Rwanda, and has an area of 2,575 square kilometres (994 sq mi).

According to the 2012 Tanzania National Census, the population of Kyerwa District was 321,026, with a population density of 120 inhabitants per square kilometre (310/sq mi).

The district is home to the Ibanda-Kyerwa National Park. The park is fed by the Kagera river that sustains animals such as hippos, leopards, antelope and buffalo.

== Transport ==
Unpaved trunk road T39 from Kayanga in Karagwe District to the Ugandan border passes through Kyerwa District from Omurushaka, Nkwenda, Isingiro, Kaisho to Murongo. There is also unpaved road from Kayanga (administrative HQ for Karagwe district) via Rwambaizi, Katera, Businde, Bugomora, Nyamiyaga to Murongo.

== Administrative subdivisions ==
As of 2012, Kyerwa District was administratively divided into 18 wards.

=== Wards ===
- Bugomora
- BUSINDE
- Isingiro
- Kaisho
- Kamuli
- Kibale
- Kibingo
- Kikukuru
- Kimuli
- Kyerwa
- Mabira
- Murongo
- Nkwenda
- Nyakatuntu
- Rukuraijo
- Rutunguru
- Rwabwere
- Songambele
- Kitwechenkura
