= Anna Tibaijuka =

Tanzanian politician and United Nations official

Hon. Professor Anna Tibaijuka MP
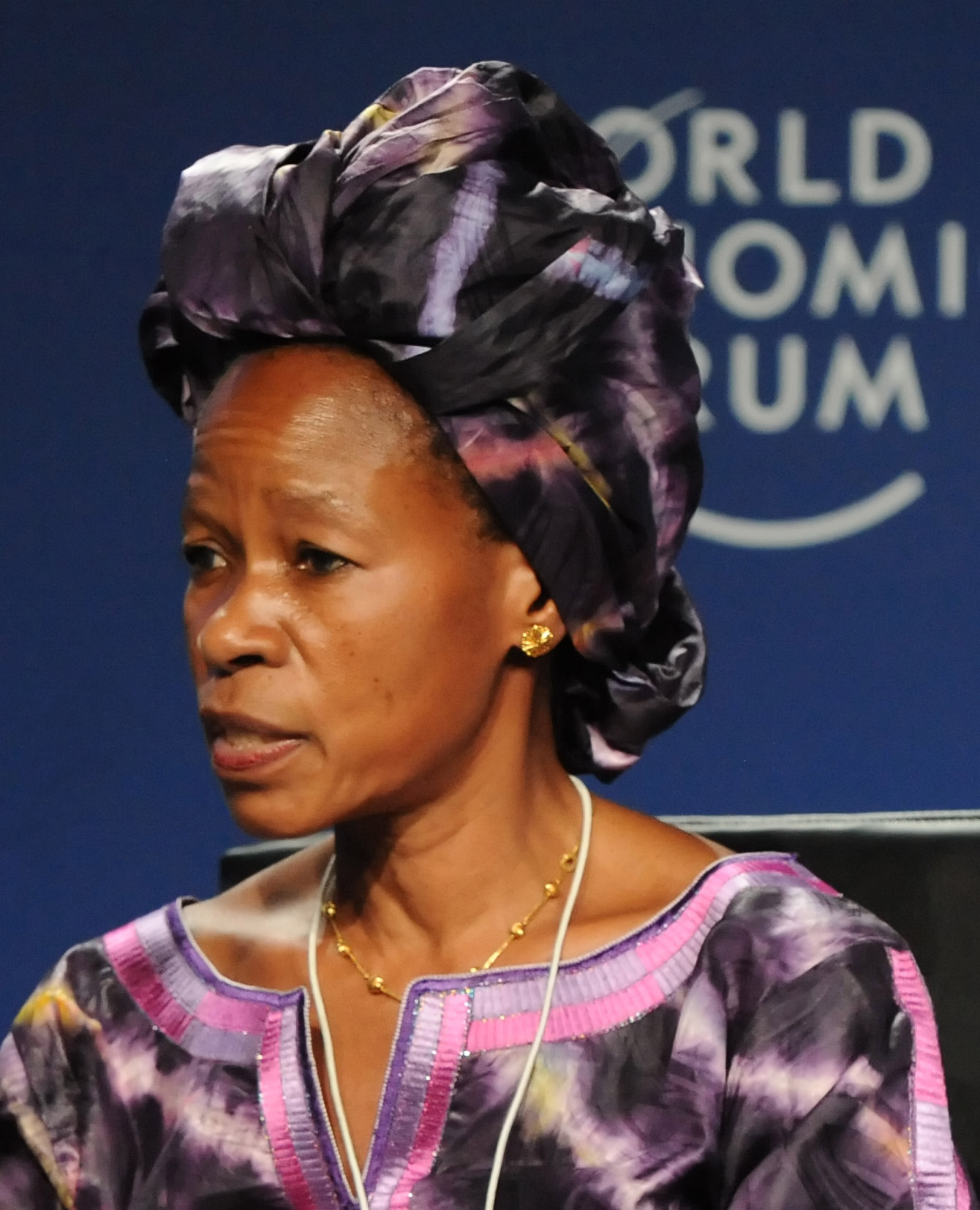
- Tibaijuka in 2010

Minister of Lands, Housing and Human Settlement Developments
- In office 28 November 2010 – 22 December 2014
- President: Jakaya Kikwete
- Preceded by: John Chiligati
- Succeeded by: William Lukuvi

Member of the Tanzanian Parliament for Muleba South
- In office November 2010 – November 2020
- Preceded by: Wilson Masilingi
- Succeeded by: Oscar Ishengoma Kikoyo

Executive director of UN–HABITAT
- In office March 2006 – 2010
- Succeeded by: Joan Clos

Personal details
- Born: 12 October 1950 (age 75) Kagabiro, Tanganyika
- Party: Chama Cha Mapinduzi
- Spouse: Wilson Kamuhabwa Tibaijuka (m. 1975–2000)
- Children: 5: Muganyizi; Kemilembe; Kagemulo; Kankiza
- Education: Sokoine University (BSc); Swedish University of Agricultural Sciences (DSc)
- Awards: Gothenburg Award
- Website: annatibaijuka.org

Anna Kajumulo Tibaijuka (/tiːbaɪdʒuːkæ/; born 12 October 1950) is a Tanzanian politician and United Nations official. She was a Chama Cha Mapinduzi (CCM) Member of the National Assembly for Muleba South constituency during 2010 to 2020 and served as the Minister of Lands, Housing and Human Settlement Developments from 2010 to 2014.

Tibaijuka is also a former Under-Secretary-General of the United Nations and executive director of the United Nations Human Settlements Programme (UN-HABITAT). She was the second highest ranking African woman in the UN system, after Deputy Secretary-General Asha-Rose Migiro, until her resignation in 2010 to run for political office in Tanzania.

== Early life and education ==
Tibaijuka was born on 12 October 1950 in Kagabiro, Muleba District, Tanganyika Territory (now a part of Kagera Region of Tanzania) to small-holder farmers. She was initially admitted at the University of Dar-es-Salaam in April 1975 to pursue a Bachelor of Science degree. She received a BSc from Sokoine University of Agriculture and studied agricultural economics at the Swedish University of Agricultural Sciences in Uppsala. She is fluent in English, Swahili, Swedish and French.

== Academic career ==
From 1993 to 1998, Tibaijuka was associate professor of economics at the University of Dar es Salaam. During this period, she was also a member of the Tanzanian government delegation to several United Nations summits, including the United Nations Conference on Human Settlements ( Istanbul, 1996); the World Food Summit (Rome, 1996); the Fourth World Conference on Women (Beijing, 1995) and the World Summit for Social Development (Copenhagen, 1995). At the World Food Summit in Rome, she was elected coordinator for Eastern Africa in the Network for Food Security, Trade and Sustainable Development (COASAD). Tibaijuka has also been a board member of UNESCO's International Scientific Advisory Board since November 1997. She is a foreign member of the Royal Swedish Academy of Agriculture and Forestry.

== United Nations career ==
=== Executive director of UN-HABITAT ===
In September, 2000, she was appointed by Secretary-General Kofi Annan, as executive-director of the United Nations Centre for Human Settlements. During her first two years in office, Tibaijuka oversaw major reforms which resulted in the United Nations General Assembly upgrading the centre to programme status and renaming it the United Nations Human Settlements Programme (UN-HABITAT). Tibaijuka was elected by the General Assembly to her first four-year term as head of the new agency in July 2002 and was given the rank of under-secretary-general, as the first African woman to reach this level within the UN system.

=== Special envoy of the secretary general ===
In June 2005, the Secretary-General appointed Tibaijuka as his Special Envoy on Human Settlements Issues in Zimbabwe, with the directive to study the impact of the Zimbabwean government's campaign to evict informal traders and people deemed to be squatting illegally in certain areas, known as Operation Murambatsvina. As the evictions were concentrated on areas which had traditionally strongly supported the oppositional Movement for Democratic Change, many commentators believed the campaign was politically motivated. Although this was denied by the Zimbabwean government, there was strong international criticism.

Tibaijuka concluded her report saying that “while purporting to target illegal dwellings and structures and to clamp down on alleged illicit activities, [the operation] was carried out in an indiscriminate and unjustified manner, with indifference to human suffering”.

=== Water Supply and Sanitation Collaborative Council ===
The steering committee of the Water Supply and Sanitation Collaborative Council elected Anna Tibaijuka as its new chair on 19 October 2010. Tibaijuka succeeded Roberto Lenton, whose second and final term of office ended in March 2011.

== Blair Commission and Commission on Africa ==
In 2004 the British prime minister, Tony Blair, invited Tibaijuka to be a member of the Commission for Africa, which he established to generate ideas and action to accelerate and sustain Africa's growth and development. The commission, comprising 16 internationally known figures, completed its report in March 2005.

== Career in politics ==
In the Tanzanian national election, held October, 2010, she became a Member of Parliament (MP) for CCM, representing the Muleba District in the Kagera Region.

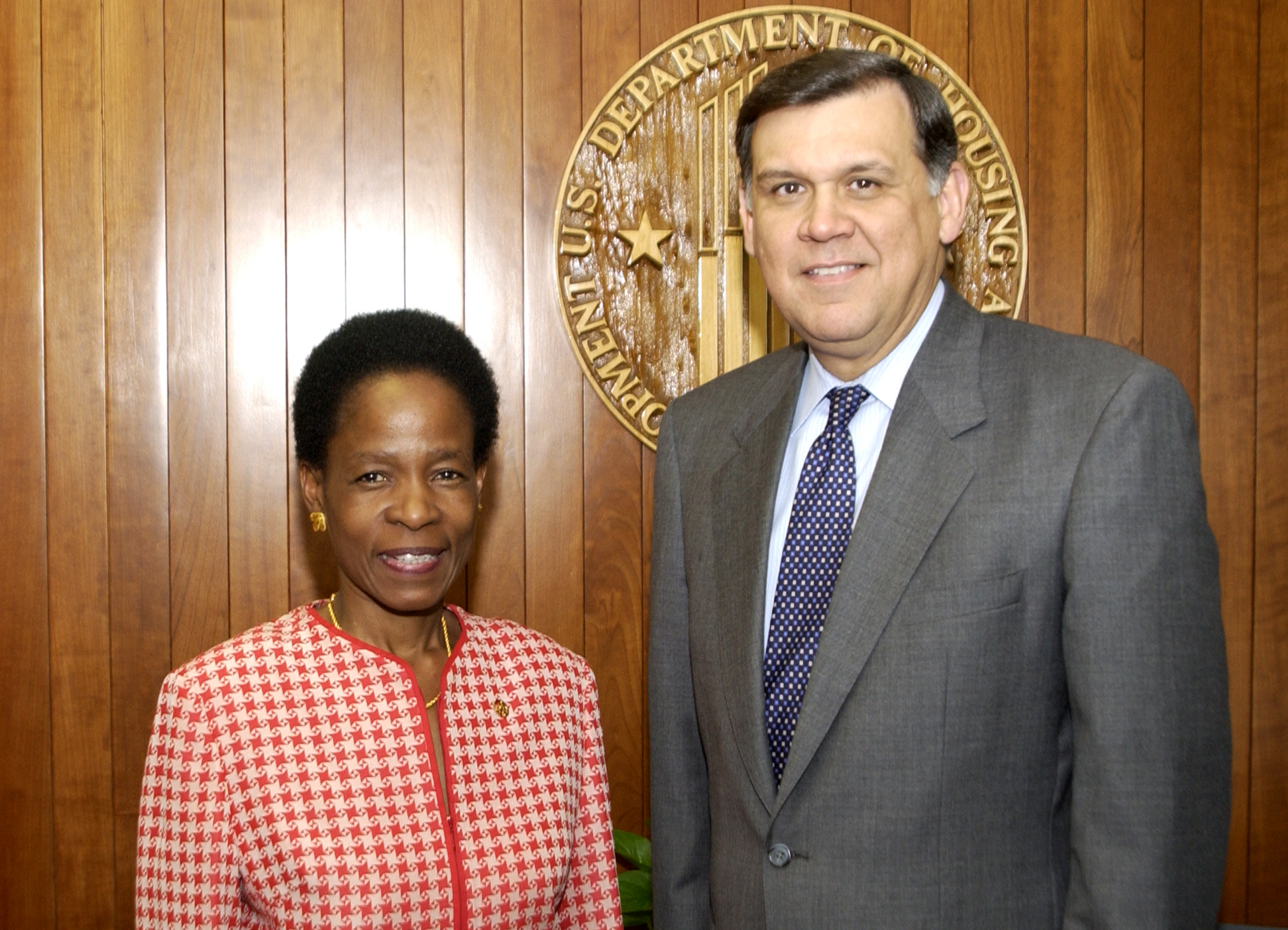
Secretary Mel Martinez with Anna Tibaijuka 207-DP-8416A-Sec0376

=== Tegeta Escrow Scandal ===
In December 2014, President of the United Republic of Tanzania Jakaya Kikwete sacked Tibaijuka from a post of Minister for Lands, Housing and Human Settlement Development over her alleged involvement in the US$250 million Tegeta escrow account scandal. Kikwete said he had asked Tibaijuka to "leave room for a new appointee," after she had not shown "due diligence" when receiving US$1 million from James Rugemalira of VIP Engineering and Marketing (VIPEM) linked to the scandal.

Tibaijuka stated that the money was a donation for the "Johansson Girls Education Trust" and that she had forwarded it after receiving it on a personal account.

=== Reelection 2015 ===
In 2015 she was renominated by 63% of regional CCM members to run again for the parliamentary seat of Muleba South. She won the election and returned to the parliament.

== Personal life ==
She was married to former Tanzanian ambassador Wilson Kamuhabwa Tibaijuka from 1975 until his death in 2000 and they have five children: Muganyizi (born 1976), Kemilembe (born 1979), Kagemulo (born 1986), Kankiza (born 1991), and one adopted child.

== Honours and awards ==
=== Awards ===
- 2009: Gothenburg Award for Sustainable Development
- 2016: Prince Khalifa Bin Salman Al-Khalifa UN Habitat Award for Sustainable Development

=== Honorary academic awards ===
| Year | University | Country | Honour |
|---|---|---|---|
| 2002 | McGill University | Canada | Doctor of Science in environment |
| 2004 | Heriot-Watt University | United Kingdom | Doctor of Science in construction |
| 2006 | University College London | United Kingdom | Doctor of Science in engineering |
| 2007 | Jomo Kenyatta University of Agriculture and Technology | Kenya | honorary degree in urban design |
| 2009 | Warsaw School of Economics | Poland | Honoris causa in economics |
| 2010 | Catholic University of Eastern Africa | Kenya | honorary degree in community development and peace |
| 2010 | Tongji University | China | Honorary professor |
