= Tanzania National Parks Authority =

Tanzanian national park agency

- Mamlaka ya Hifadhi za Taifa Tanzania (Swahili)

Government agency overview
- Formed: 1959
- Type: Parastatal
- Jurisdiction: 21 National Parks
- Headquarters: Arusha, Tanzania
- Motto: Sustainable Conservation and Tourism Excellence
- Employees: 2200 (2015)
- Minister responsible: Pindi Chana, Minister of Natural Resources and Tourism
- Government agency executive: Musa N.K. Juma, Conservation Commissioner
- Website: Agency website

The Tanzania National Parks Authority (Swahili: Shirika la Hifadhi za Taifa Tanzania) commonly known as TANAPA is responsible for the management and conservation of all national parks in the country, aiming to protect biodiversity and promote sustainable tourism. TANAPA is a parastatal corporation and all its income is reinvested into the organization. It is governed by a number of instruments including the National Parks Act, Chapter 282 of the 2002 and the Wildlife Conservation Act No. 5 of 2009. TANAPA manages the nation's 21 National parks which covers approximately 15% of the land area and has the mandate to conserve and manage the wildlife in Tanzania, and to enforce the related laws and regulations in this industry. It manages the biodiversity of the country, protecting and conserving the flora and fauna. The organization does not have a mandate over the game reserves such as the Selous Game Reserve which is managed by the Tanzanian Wildlife Authority and the Ngorongoro Conservation Area managed by the Ngorongoro Conservation Authority.

The Arusha Manifesto gave the initial foundation for the expansion of the Tanzanian National Parks and an increase in protected areas in the country, as of December 2015 parks, reserves and conservation areas cover about 14% percent of the land. Currently TANAPA is governed by the National Parks Ordinance Chapter 282 of the 2002 and manages 21 national parks.

== National Parks ==
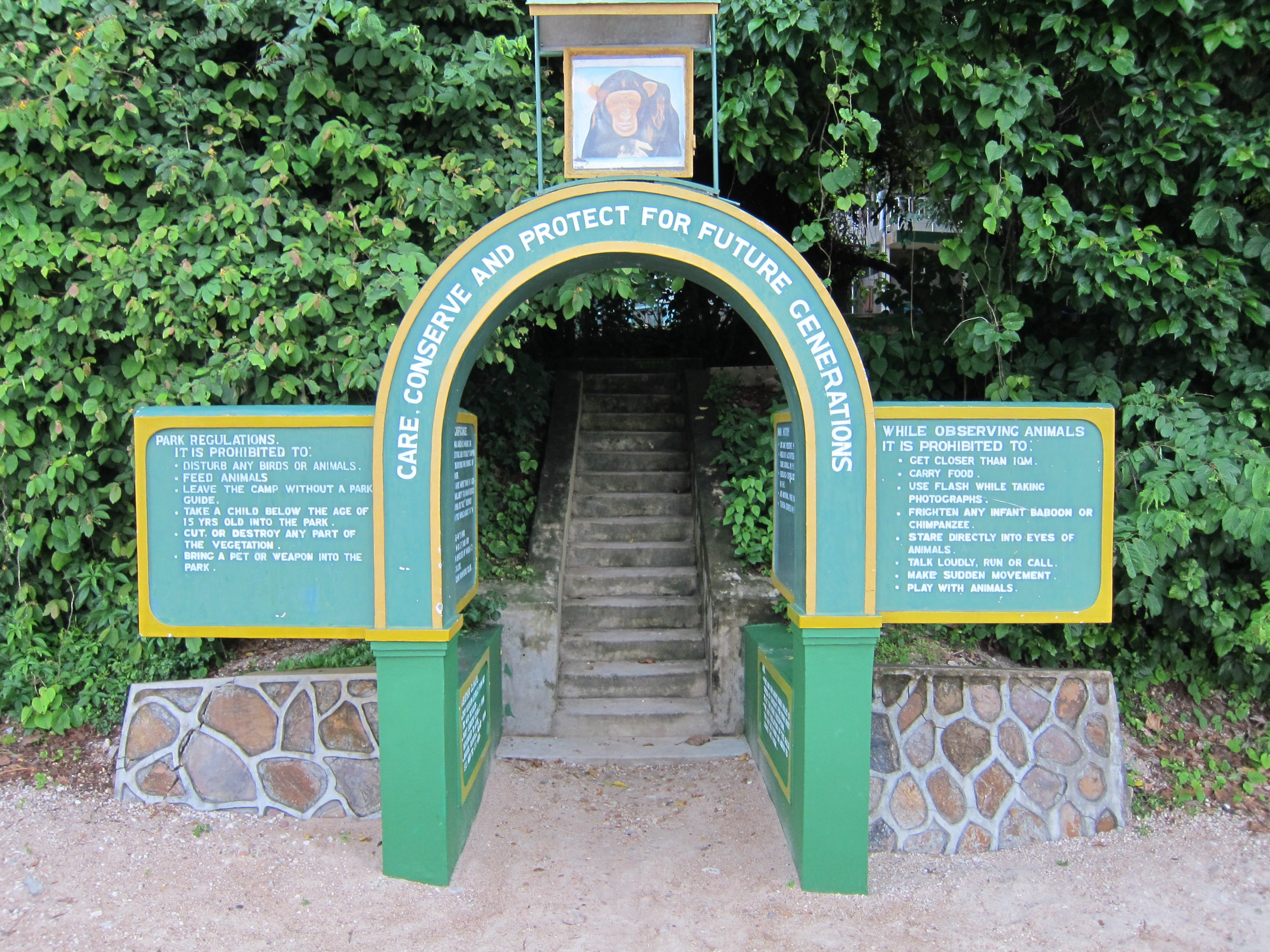
The entrance to Gombe Stream National Park.

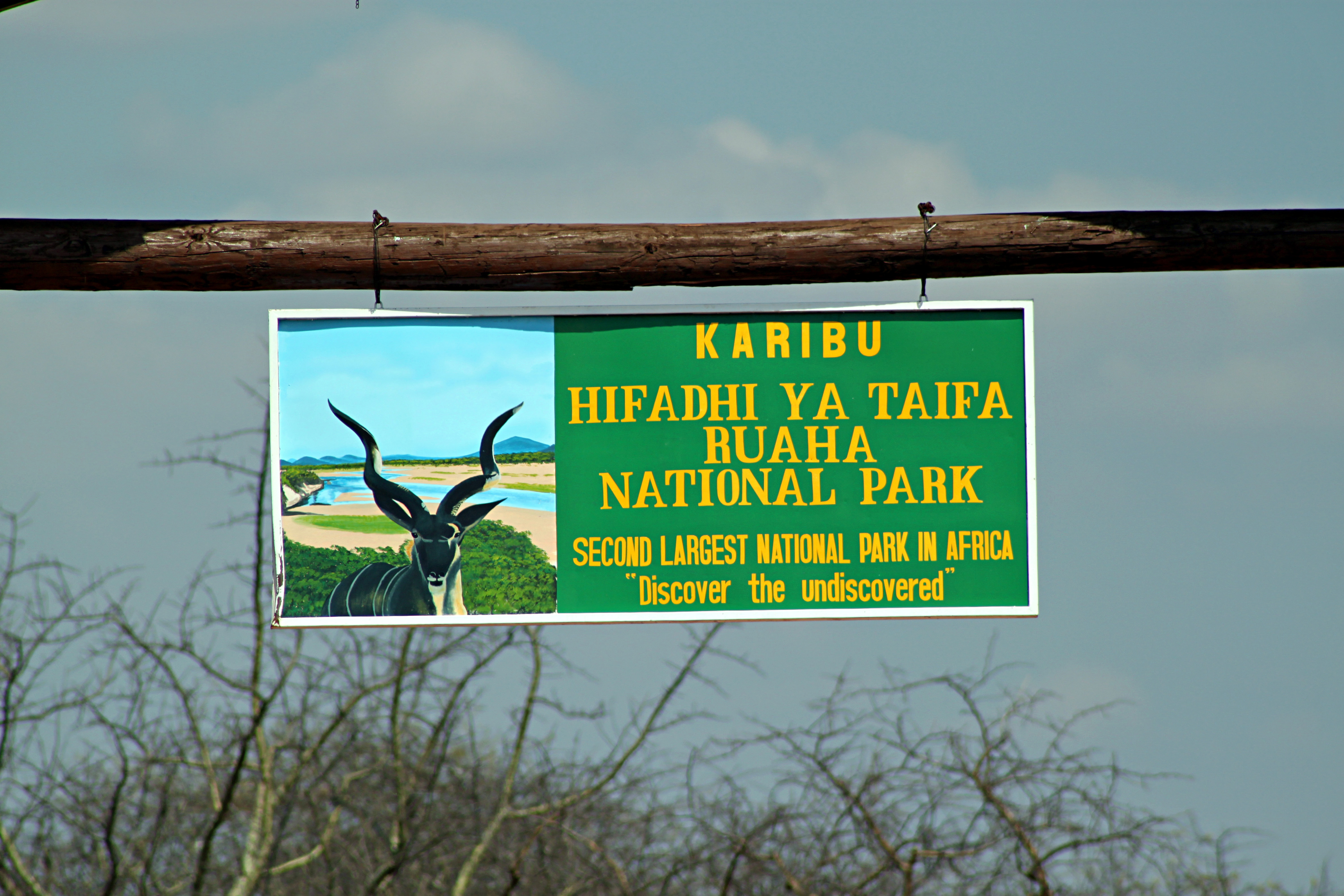
The Ruaha National Park Entrance

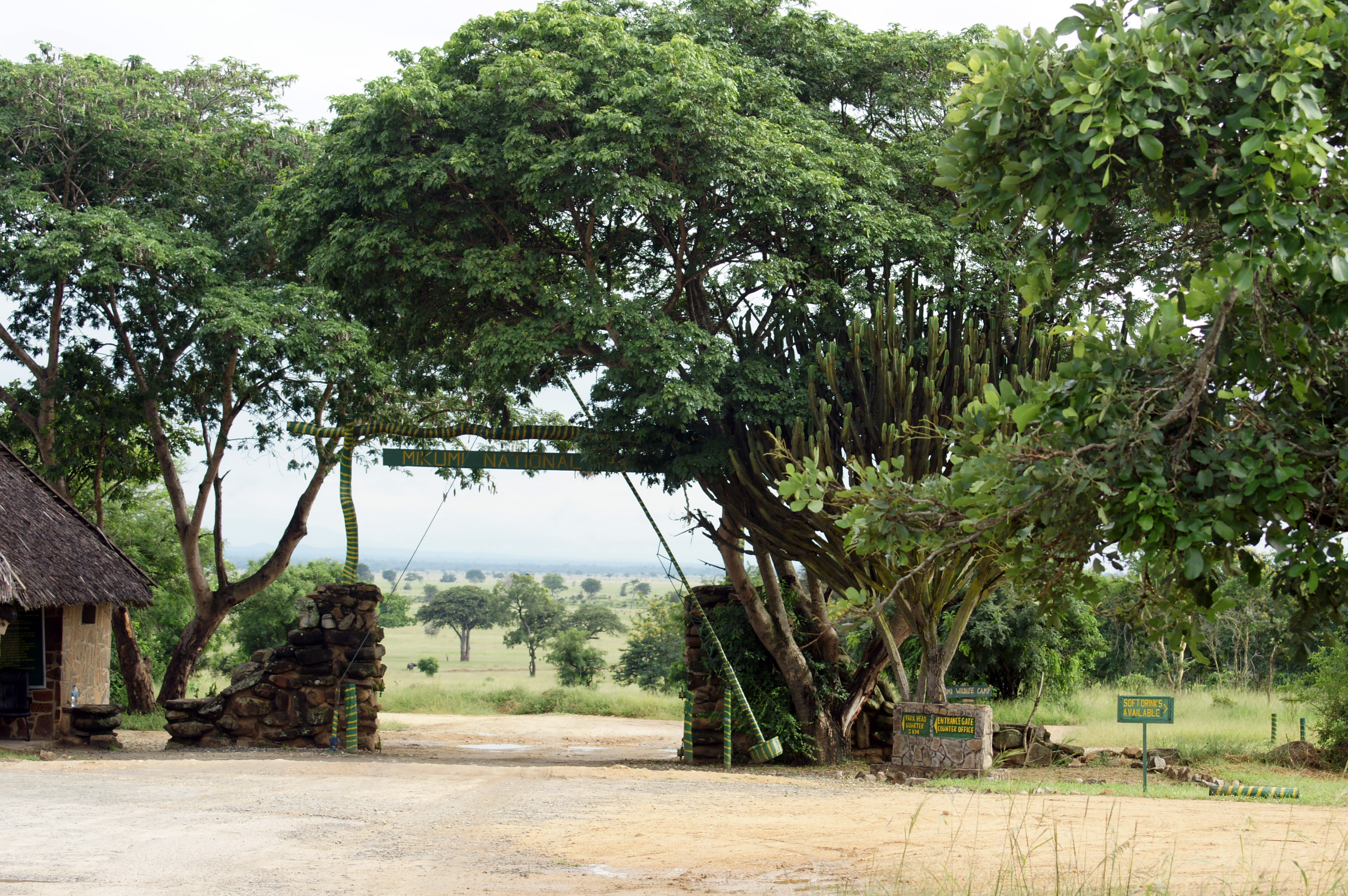
The Mikumi National Park Entrance

TANAPA manages 22 national parks covering an area of 99,306.50 km^{2} (38,342 sq mi) approximately the land area of Croatia. TANAPA is responsible for the following parks:

- Arusha National Park
- Burigi-Chato National Park
- Gombe Stream National Park
- Ibanda-Kyerwa National Park
- Katavi National Park
- Kigosi National Park
- Kilimanjaro National Park
- Kitulo National Park
- Lake Manyara National Park
- Mahale Mountains National Park
- Mikumi National Park
- Mkomazi National Park
- Nyerere National Park
- Ruaha National Park
- Rubondo Island National Park
- Rumanyika-Karagwe National Park
- Saadani National Park
- Saanane Island National Park
- Serengeti National Park
- Tarangire National Park
- Udzungwa Mountains National Park
- Ugalla River National Park

=== Statistics ===
TANAPA's main source of revenue is sourced from tourist arrivals. TANAPA in collaboration with the Tanzania Tourist Board markets the national parks locally and internationally to attract visitors. TANAPA has also been mandated to promote domestic tourism.

	2008-09	2009-10	2010-11	2011-12	2012-13	2013-14	2014-15	2015-16	2016-17	2017-18	2018-19
Total Number of Visitors	736,829	679,006	682,218	942,664	901,892	957,380	958,234	957,576	982,340	1,079,263	1,196,284
Percentage Foreign (%)	59%	57%	62%	59%	56%	50%	55%	54%	61%	62%	61%
Notes/sources											

== Principal activities ==
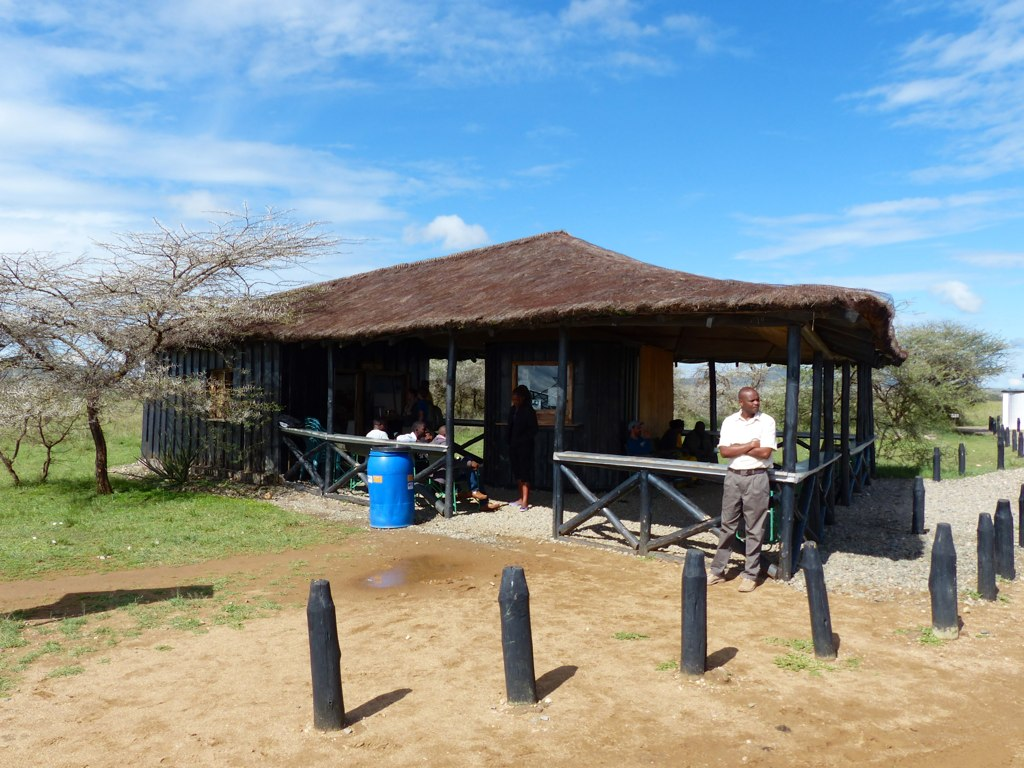
The Seronera Airstrip Terminal

A TANAPA Land rover 4x4 vehicle at the Lukukuru post in the Rubondo Island National Park.

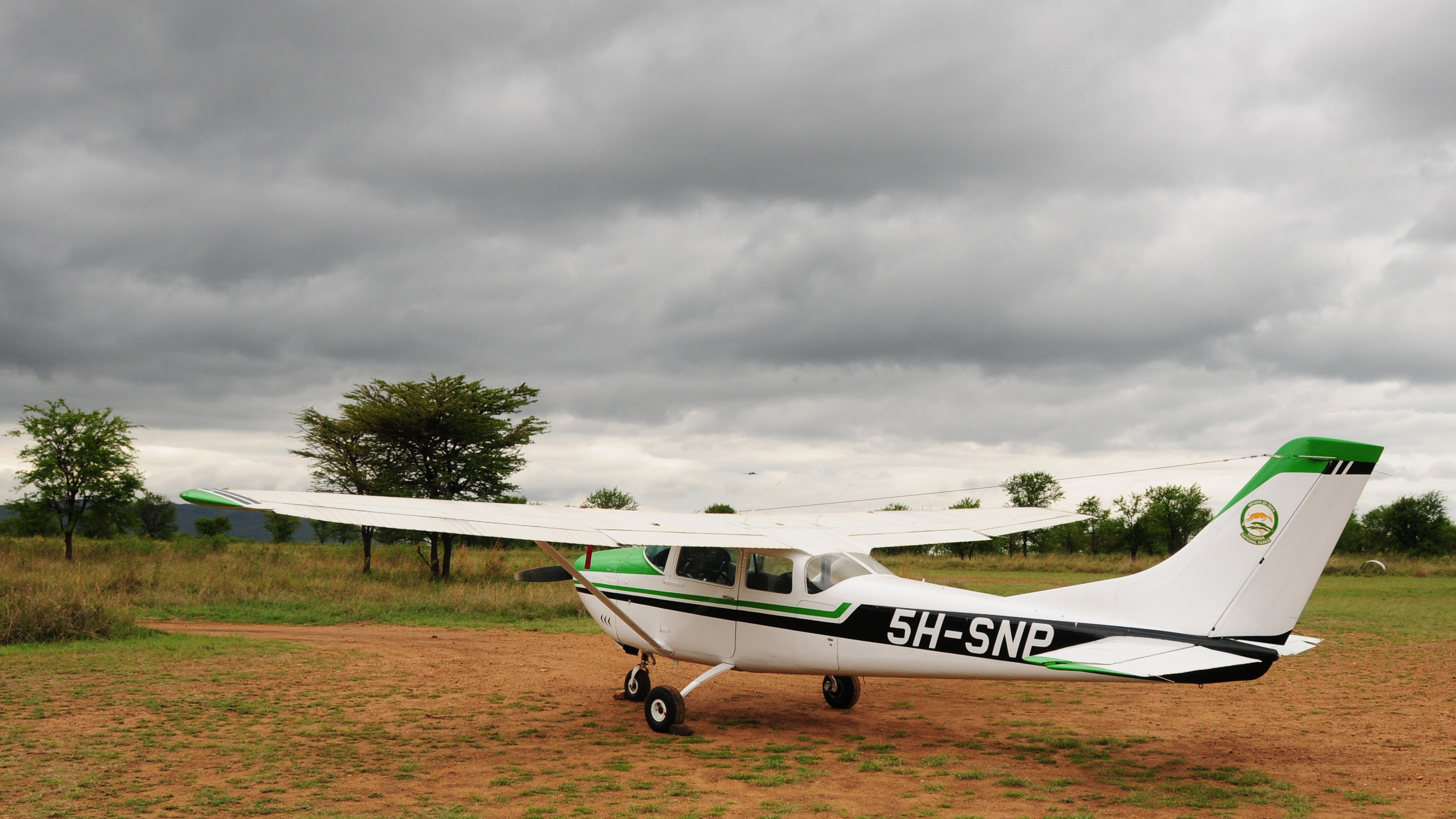
A TANAPA Patrol Aircraft

It is TANAPA's first and foremost goal to protect the wildlife and natural resources living in the park and to ensure tourists do not cause damage to the ecosystem. The organization has received various donations of vehicles and aircraft to help train rangers with modern technology and techniques.

TANAPA also pays to maintain the park facilities for tourists and conservation activities such as Roads, Gates, Boundaries and Airstrips. TANAPA currently manages 26 airstrips throughout its network of national parks. Often forest fires break out in the parks and it is under TANAPA's mandate to put them out. The authority also has in place a Fire management plan implemented yearly which help reducing number of destructive insect e.g. tsetse fly, help reduce the amount of litter that can catalyze a fire during dry season and also early burning of the grass helps facilitate new forage for animals.

== Administration ==
TANAPA is overseen by the Conservation Commissioner, who is supported by two Deputy Commissioners: one responsible for business development and the other for corporate services, such as managing relationships with tour operators. Additionally, there are four Zonal Commissioners for the Northern, Southern, Eastern, and Western zones.

Since 29 January 2024, the current Conservation Commissioner is Musa Nassoro Kuji Juma. He succeeded Allan Kijazi, who held the position from 2011.

== See also ==
- List of protected areas of Tanzania
- Ministry of Natural Resources and Tourism
- Tanzania Wildlife Research Institute
