= Missenyi District =

District of Kagera Region, Tanzania

Missenyi District Wilaya ya Missenyi
- District
- Missenyi District of Kagera Region
- Coordinates: 1.132222°S 31.438056°E
- Country: Tanzania
- Region: Kagera Region
- Established: 2007

Government
  - Type: Council
  - Body: Missenyi District Council
  - District Commissioner: Wilson Christian Sakulo
  - District Secretary: Abdallah R. Mayomba
  - Chairman of Council: Projestus Tegamaisho

Area
  - Total: 2,825 km^{2} (1,091 sq mi)
- Elevation: 1,200 m (3,900 ft)

Population (2022)
  - Total: 245,394
  - Density: 86.87/km^{2} (225.0/sq mi)
- Website: http://www.missenyidc.go.tz/

Missenyi District is one of the eight districts of the Kagera Region of Tanzania. The district was created in 2007 out of Bukoba District. It is bordered to the north by Uganda, to the east by Bukoba Rural District, to the south by Karagwe District and to the west by Kyerwa District.

According to the 2012 Tanzania National Census, the population of Missenyi District was 202,632, with a population density of 72 inhabitants per square kilometre (190/sq mi). By 2022, the population had grown to 245,394.

== Administrative subdivisions ==
As of 2012, Missenyi District was administratively divided into 20 wards with 77 villages.

=== Wards ===
- Bugandika
- Bugorora
- Buyango
- Bwanjai
- Gera
- Ishozi
- Ishunju
- Kakunyu
- Kanyigo
- Kashenye
- Kassambya
- Kilimilile
- Kitobo
- Kyaka
- Mabale
- Minziro
- Mushasha
- Mutukula
- Nsunga
- Ruzinga

== Transport ==
Paved trunk road T4 from Mwanza to the Ugandan border passes through Missenyi District. Unpaved trunk road T38 to Ngara District, through Karagwe District, branches off from T4 in the village of Kyaka.

== Ugandan invasion ==
In October 1978, Uganda launched an invasion into the Kagera Salient in northern Tanzania, initiating the Uganda–Tanzania War. By early January 1979, all Ugandan troops had been ejected from Kagera.
