= Bukoba Rural District =

District in Kagera Region, Tanzania

Bukoba Rural District Wilaya ya Bukoba
- District
- Coordinates: 1.483333°S 31.533333°E
- Country: Tanzania
- Region: Kagera

Government
  - Type: Council
  - Body: Bukoba District Council
  - District Commissioner: Moses Joseph Machali (CCM)
  - District Secretary: Kadole Kilugala
  - Chairman of Council: Murshid Hashim Ngeze

Area
  - Total: 1,654 km^{2} (639 sq mi)
- Elevation: 1,800 m (5,900 ft)

Population (2022)
  - Total: 322,448
  - Density: 195.0/km^{2} (504.9/sq mi)
- Time zone: UTC+3 (EAT)
- Area code: 028
- Website: District Website

Bukoba Rural District is one of the eight districts of the Kagera Region of Tanzania. It is bordered to the north by Missenyi District, to the east by Lake Victoria and Bukoba Urban District, to the south by Muleba District and to the west by Karagwe District. Its administrative seat is Bukoba town.

At the 2012 Tanzania National Census, the population of Bukoba Rural District was 289,697, from 394,020 in 2002, and 340,800 in 1988. The district area is 1,654 square kilometres (639 sq mi), with a population density of 175.2 square kilometres (67.6 sq mi) There are 29 wards, 94 villages, and 515 suburbs in the district.

== Transport ==
Paved trunk road T4 from Mwanza to the Ugandan border passes through Bukoba Rural District.

== Administrative subdivisions ==
As of 2012, This rural district was administratively divided into 29 wards.

=== Wards ===
- Buhendangabo
- Bujugo
- Butelankuzi
- Butulage
- Ibwera
- Izimbya
- Kaagya
- Kaibanja
- Kanyangereko
- Karabagaine
- Kasharu
- Katerero
- Katoma
- Katoro
- Kemondo
- Kibirizi
- Kikomero
- Kishanje
- Kishogo
- Kyamulaile
- Maruku
- Mikoni
- Mugajwale
- Nyakato
- Nyakibimbili
- Rubafu
- Rubale
- Ruhunga
- Rukoma
