= Justinian Rweyemamu =

Tanzanian economist (1942–1982)

Justinian F Rweyemamu
- Born: September 28, 1942; Bukoba, Kagera Region, Tanganyika Territory
- Died: March 30, 1982 (aged 40); New York, New York, United States
- Children: Julie Nyangoma Rweyemamu

Academic background
- Education: Harvard University (Ph.D., 1971); Fordham University (B.A., 1965)

Academic work
- Discipline: Development Economics
- School or tradition: Development Economics
- Institutions: the United Nations 1970s–1982 Office of the President of Tanzania 1970s Ministry of Planning 1970s the University of Dar es Salaam 1967–1976
- Notable ideas: Africa industrialisation strategy International Monetary System and the New International Order

Justinian F. Rweyemamu (28 September 1942 – 30 March 1982) was Tanzania’s first major economics scholar. Considered by many as the outstanding representative of the post-independence African scholars, he was also a pan-Africanist, political strategist, and international civil servant. The first Tanzanian to get PhD in Harvard University.

== Early life and education ==
Rweyemamu was born on 28 September 1942 in Katoma, a small village in the outskirts of Bukoba town located in Kagera Region, Tanzania. In 1958 he joined St. Thomas More College Ihungo, a Catholic secondary school in Bukoba, and in 1961 graduated top of his class. He then went to the USA on a scholarship to pursue undergraduate education on the eve of his country’s independence from the British. He enrolled at Fordham University, where he majored and graduated with a Bachelor of Science degree in Economics, Applied Mathematics and Philosophy (1965). At Fordham he was an active member of the university's Economics club and the Philosophy club.

He went on to Harvard University for his graduate and doctoral studies in Economics (Ph.D 1971) under a fellowship from the Rockefeller Foundation, studying under economists Albert Hirschman and Thomas Weisskopf. While at Harvard, he was a contemporary of the political scientist Mahmood Mamdani and documentary film-maker James Ault, with whom they formed the informal Harvard “Africa Group”. His Ph.D thesis, entitled “An Industrial Strategy for Tanzania”, was a seminal work in the development economics scene, and its revised version was later published by Oxford University Press as Underdevelopment and Industrialization in Tanzania; a study of perverse capitalist industrial development (1973).

== Career ==
On completion of graduate studies, he returned to his native land and took up a faculty position at the Department of Economics of the University of Dar es Salaam, and was later the Dean of its Faculty of Social Sciences. He then took up position in the Government to become more of an actor, than a privileged spectator in academia. In the government he was appointed (1975) Permanent Secretary of the Planning Ministry and subsequently Personal Assistant (Economic affairs) to the then President of the Republic Julius Nyerere. In a span of just a few years he became internationally recognized, due to his thought provoking economic analysis and recommendations of the economic plight of the poor nations. He was thus appointed Chairman of the Council for the Development of Social Science Research In Africa (CODESRIA), member of the Committee of the Third World Forum and a founding member of The International Foundation for Development Alternatives (IFDA).

In 1977 he left the country for a high-profile appointment in the UN, first in Switzerland and then later New York, USA. During his time in the UN he was a member of the UN Committee for Development Planning, worked for the Brandt Commission and worked for the UN Director General for Development and International Cooperation till his untimely death caused by cancer on 30 March 1982.

Rweyemamu is remembered as the father of Tanzanian economics and made his greatest impact through the remarkable concentration of his students in top echelons of government and academia. These include: Jakaya Kikwete, the fourth President of the United Republic of Tanzania; Benno Ndulu, the Governor of the Bank of Tanzania. Ibrahim Lipumba, Tanzania’s academician and politician; Delphin Rwegasira, Tanzanian economist.

Rweyemamu died from cancer on March 30, 1982.

In 1982, his friends and colleagues established the Justinian F. Rweyemamu Prize in order to perpetuate the academic spirit of J F Rweyemamu and to stimulate young Africans to follow his example in placing their talent at the service of their people. It was established by four of the institutions with which Justinian Rweyemamu was affiliated: CODESRIA, the Dag Hammarskjöld Foundation, IFDS, and the Third World Forum. Among the recipients of this prize is Calestous Juma, a prominent Kenyan scientist based at Harvard University.

== Selected writings ==
Rweyemamu’s works include;

- Underdevelopment and Industrialization in Tanzania: A Study of Perverse Capitalist Development (Nairobi: Oxford University Press, 1973)
- Towards Socialist Planning
- The Teaching of Economics in Africa
- Industrialization and Income Distribution in Africa
- Pugwash on Self-reliance
- North-South: A Programme for Survival (The Brandt report)
- Dialogue for a New Order
- Third World Options: Power, security and hope for another development (Tanzania Publishing House, 1992).
