= Ali Mufuruki =

Tanzanian businessman and motivational speaker

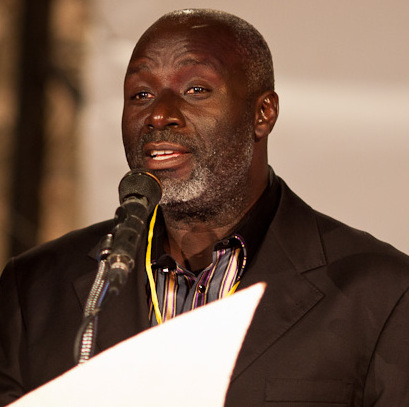
- Born: Kagera Region, Tanganyika Territory
- Died: 7 December 2019 (aged 60); Dar-es-Salaam, Tanzania
- Resting place: Dar-es-Salaam, Tanzania
- Education: Reutlingen University (BSc)
- Occupations: Businessman and Philanthropist
- Children: 4

Ali Mufuruki (1959 – December 7, 2019) was a Tanzanian businessman, author, founder and board member of several organisations. He was the founder of Infotech Investment Group, founding chairman of CEO Roundtable of Tanzania and Africa Leadership Initiative (ALI) East Africa, board chairman of Vodacom Tanzania and Wananchi Group Holdings, trustee of the Mandela Institute for Development Studies (MINDS) and co-author of the book Tanzania's Industrialization Journey, 2016–2056.

He died on 7 December 2019 Saturday at the Morningside Hospital in Johannesburg, South Africa.
