= Saida Karoli =

- Born: 4 April 1976 (age 49); Rwongwe, Bukoba Rural district, Kagera Region, Tanzania
- Origin: Kagera Region, Tanzania
- Genres: Ngoma music; Bongo Flava
- Occupations: Singer; Songwriter; Composer
- Instruments: Vocals; Ngoma drums
- Years active: 2001-
- Labels: FM Production Ltd.

Saida Karoli (born 4 April 1976) is a traditionalist Tanzanian singer and performer who has staged live shows in Tanzania, Kenya, Uganda, Rwanda, Burundi and DRC.

Karoli was born in 1976 in Rwongwe, a small village in the Bukoba Rural district in the northern Tanzanian Kagera Region on the western side of Lake Victoria. "Maria Salome", a song from her first album Chambua kama Karanga reached number three in airplay on Tanzanian radio. After the song's success in Uganda, she became popularly known there as Wanchekecha, a nickname derived from the lyrics of the song. She has entertained the Kabaka of Buganda and is an act at Zanzibar's Sauti Za Busara Festival. Most recently she was nominated for several honors at the Kora All-African Music Awards.

In style, Karoli's music is described as natural with mellow vocals and hypnotically rhythmicism. Though she sings primarily in her native tongue Haya, her lyrics also incorporate extensive Swahili (the common East African Language) and the occasional phrase in English. She is managed by Felician Mutta, the CEO of FM Productions LTO.

At the 2005 Tanzania Music Awards her album Harusi was nominated in the Best Folk Album category and at the 2006 Tanzania Music Awards, she was nominated for the Best Female Vocalist category. In 2013, her song "Maria Salome" was featured in the Tyler Perry-produced movie Peeples

In 2016 she was paid royalties by Diamond Platnumz for redoing her song "Salome".

== Discography ==
- Chambua kama Karanga (Maria Salome) (2001)
- Mapenzi kizunguzungu (2003)
- Harusi (2004)
- Mimi Nakupenda (2005)
- Nelly (2008)
- Akatambala Ft. Baliruno K. Hanson (2018)
