= Muleba District =

District of Kagera Region

Muleba District Wilaya ya Muleba
- District
- Muleba District of Kagera Region
- Coordinates: 2°00′S 31°30′E
- Country: Tanzania
- Region: Kagera Region

Government
  - Type: Council
  - Body: Muleba District Council
  - District Commissioner: Toba Alnason Ngwila
  - District Secretary: Greyson I. Mwengu
  - Chairman of Council: Magongo Justus John

Area
  - Total: 3,518 km^{2} (1,358 sq mi)
- Elevation: 1,200 m (3,900 ft)

Population (2022 census)
  - Total: 637,659
  - Density: 181.3/km^{2} (469.5/sq mi)
- Website: District website

Muleba is one of the six districts of the Kagera Region of Tanzania. It is bordered to the north by Bukoba Urban and Bukoba Rural districts, to the south by Biharamulo District, to the east by Lake Victoria and to the west by Ngara and Karagwe districts. The district covers area of 3,518 square kilometres (1,358 sq mi).

According to the 2022 Tanzania National Census, the population of the Muleba District was 637,659, from 424,287 in 2002, and 284,137 in 1988 The population density is 150 inhabitants per square kilometre (390/sq mi). There are 166 villages, and 135,645 households in Muleba.

== Wards ==
The Muleba District is administratively divided into 33 wards:

- Bisheke
- Biirabo
- Buganguzi
- Bulyakashaju
- Bumbile
- Burungura
- Goziba
- Ibuga
- Ijumbi
- Ikondo
- Izigo
- Kabirizi
- Kagoma
- Kamachumu
- Karambi
- Kasharunga
- Kashasha
- Kibanga
- Kimwani
- Kishanda
- Kyebitembe
- Magata Karutanga
- Mazinga
- Mubunda
- Muhutwe
- Muleba
- Muyondwe
- Ngenge
- Nshamba
- Ruhanga
- Rushwa
