= List of kings of Karagwe =

List of kings in Karagwe Tanzania

The Kingdom of Karagwe was located in the north-western part of Tanzania. It was also known as Bunyambo. The title of the King was Omuggabe. The Abagabe that ruled this kingdom were as follows:

- Nono
- Maliza (Queen)
- Wamala
- Ruhinda I Rwa Njunanaki Rwa Igaba
- Ntare I
- Ruhinda II
- Ntare II
- Ruhinda III
- Ruhinda IV
- Ntare IV
- Ruhinda V
- Ntare V
- Rusatira (died 1725)
- Mahinga (1725 - 1750)
- Kalemera I Ntagara Bwiragenda (1750–1775)
- Ntare VI Kitabanyoro (1775–1795)
- Ruhinda VI Orushongo Rwanyabugondo (1795–1820)
- Ntagara I Ruzingomucucu Rwa Mkwanzi (1820–1855)
- Rumanika I Rugunda (1855–1881)
- Kalemera II Kanyenje (1881–1882)
- Ndagara II Nyamukuba (1882–1893)
- Ntare VII (1893–1914)
- Gahigi I (1914–1916)
- Rumanika II -1st round (1916–1939)
- Ruhinda VII Rutogo (15 Feb 1939 - 1962)
- Rumanika II-2nd round (1962)
