= Nyambo language =

Bantu language

Nyambo
- Orunyambo
- Native to: Tanzania
- Region: Kagera Region
- Native speakers: 400,000 (2003)
- Language family: Niger–Congo?: Atlantic–Congo; Volta-Congo; Benue–Congo; Bantoid; Southern Bantoid; Bantu; Northeast Bantu; Great Lakes Bantu; West Nyanza; Rutara; South Rutara; Nyambo

Language codes
- ISO 639-3: now
- Glottolog: nyam1277
- Guthrie code: JE.21

The Nyambo, or Ragwe, are a Bantu ethnic and linguistic group based in the Karagwe District of Kagera Region in far northwestern Tanzania. The Nyambo population is estimated to number 670,000. Their closest relatives are the Haya people.
