= Tanzania Wildlife Research Institute =

State-run body which organizes wildlife research in Tanzania

Logo of Tanzania Wildlife Research Institute

The Tanzania Wildlife Research Institute (TAWIRI) is a state-run body which organizes wildlife research in Tanzania. The Institute is under the Ministry of Natural Resources and Tourism.

== See also ==
- Tanzania National Parks Authority
- College of African Wildlife Management

== Sources ==
- http://www.tanzaniamammals.org/uploads/documents/Employment%20Opportunity.pdf
