= Bukoba Urban District =

District in Kagera Region, Tanzania

Bukoba Municipality Manispaa ya Bukoba
- Municipality
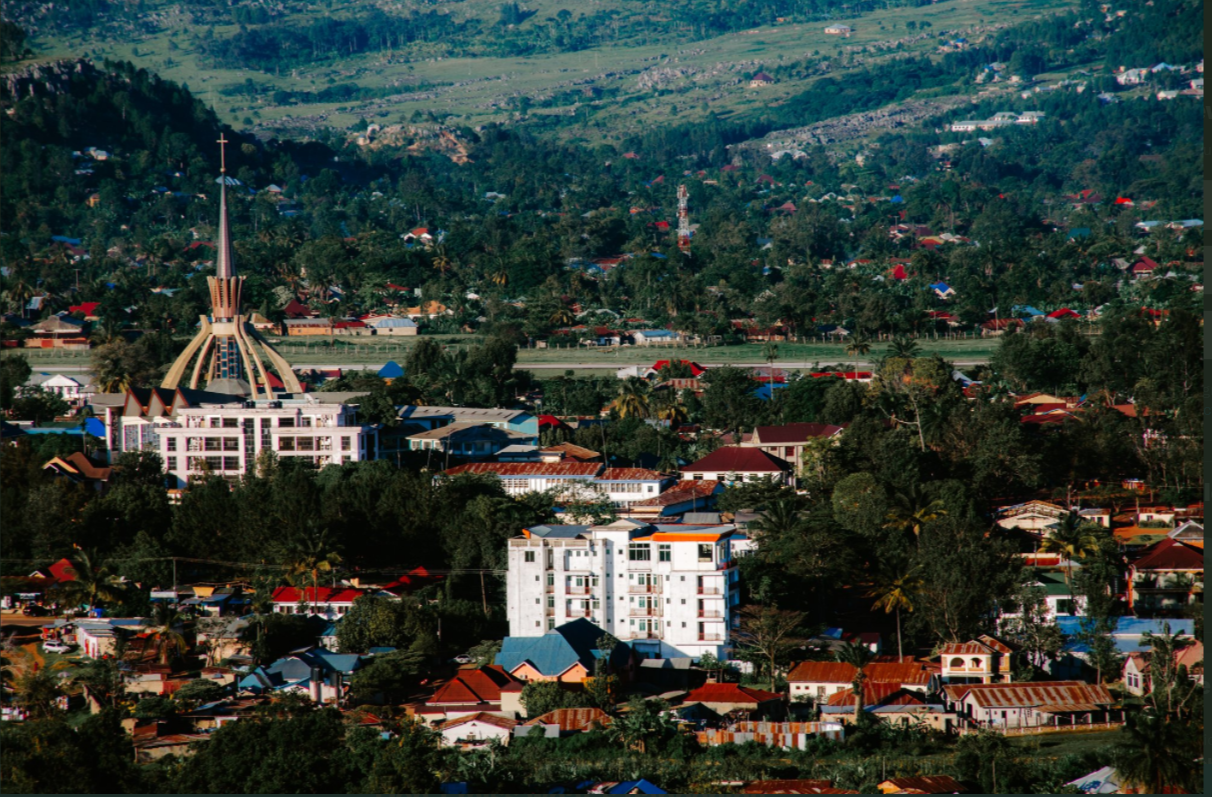
- Bukoba, Tanzania

- Bukoba municipality of Kagera Region
- Coordinates: 1.333333°S 31.816667°E
- Country: Tanzania
- Region: Kagera Region
- Established: 1960

Government
  - Type: Council
  - Body: Bukoba Municipal Council
  - Mayor: Godson Rwegasira
  - Director: Jacob S. Nkwera
  - Deputy Mayor: Mwajabu R.Galiatano

Area
  - Total: 84.25 km^{2} (32.53 sq mi)
  - Land: 61 km^{2} (24 sq mi)
  - Water: 22 km^{2} (8.5 sq mi)
- Elevation: 1,150 m (3,770 ft)

Population (2022 census)
  - Total: 144,938
  - Density: 2,400/km^{2} (6,200/sq mi)
- Time zone: EAT
- Area code: 028
- Website: Municipal Website

Bukoba Urban District is one of the eight districts of the Kagera Region of Tanzania. It is bordered to east by Lake Victoria and to the west by Bukoba Rural District. Its administrative seat is the town of Bukoba.

According to the 2012 Tanzania National Census, the population of Bukoba Urban District was 128,796, from 80,868 in 2002, and 46,503 in 1988. The district area is 83.25 square kilometres (32.14 sq mi), with a population density of 1,547 square kilometres (597 sq mi) There are 14 wards and 66 neighborhoods within the municipality.

== Transport ==
=== Road ===
Paved trunk road T4 from Mwanza to the Ugandan border passes through Bukoba Urban District.

== Administrative subdivisions ==
As of 2022, Bukoba Urban District was administratively divided into 14 wards.

=== Wards ===
- Bakoba
- Bilele
- Buhemba
- Hamugembe
- Ijuganyondo
- Kagondo
- Kahororo
- Kashai
- Kibeta
- Kitendaguroward
- Miembeni
- Nshambya
- Nyanga
- Rwamishenye
