= Ibanda-Kyerwa National Park =

National park in Tanzania

- IUCN category II (national park)
- Location within Tanzania
- Coordinates: 1.19°S 30.57°E
- Area: 200 square kilometres (77 sq mi)
- Established: 2019

The Ibanda-Kyerwa National Park, previously Ibanda Game Reserve, is a national park in Tanzania. Originally established in 1974, it was designated a national park in 2019. The national park is located in Kagera Region and has an area of 200 square kilometres (77 sq mi). The park is rich in wildlife attractions and sunrise and sunset are easily seen. Animals found in this national park include hippos, antelopes, Thomson gazelles, impalas, elands, and baboons. The park can be reached by flight from Dar es Salaam Airport to Bukoba Airport and then by road from Bukoba town to the park.

The rainy season is between January and April.

Kagera River is the main source of water for this park and nourishes its rich resources.

Hunting safaris are the most common activities in this area.

== Tourist arrivals ==
Ibanda Kyerwa is one of the least visited national parks in Tanzania, with visitor statistics frequently absent from popular sources. To address this and increase tourist arrivals, in 2024 the government invested TSh 3.9 billion (approximately USD 1.45 million as of September 2024) to develop tourism facilities within the park.
