= Kagera Region =

Region of Tanzania

Kagera Region Mkoa wa Kagera (Swahili)
- Region
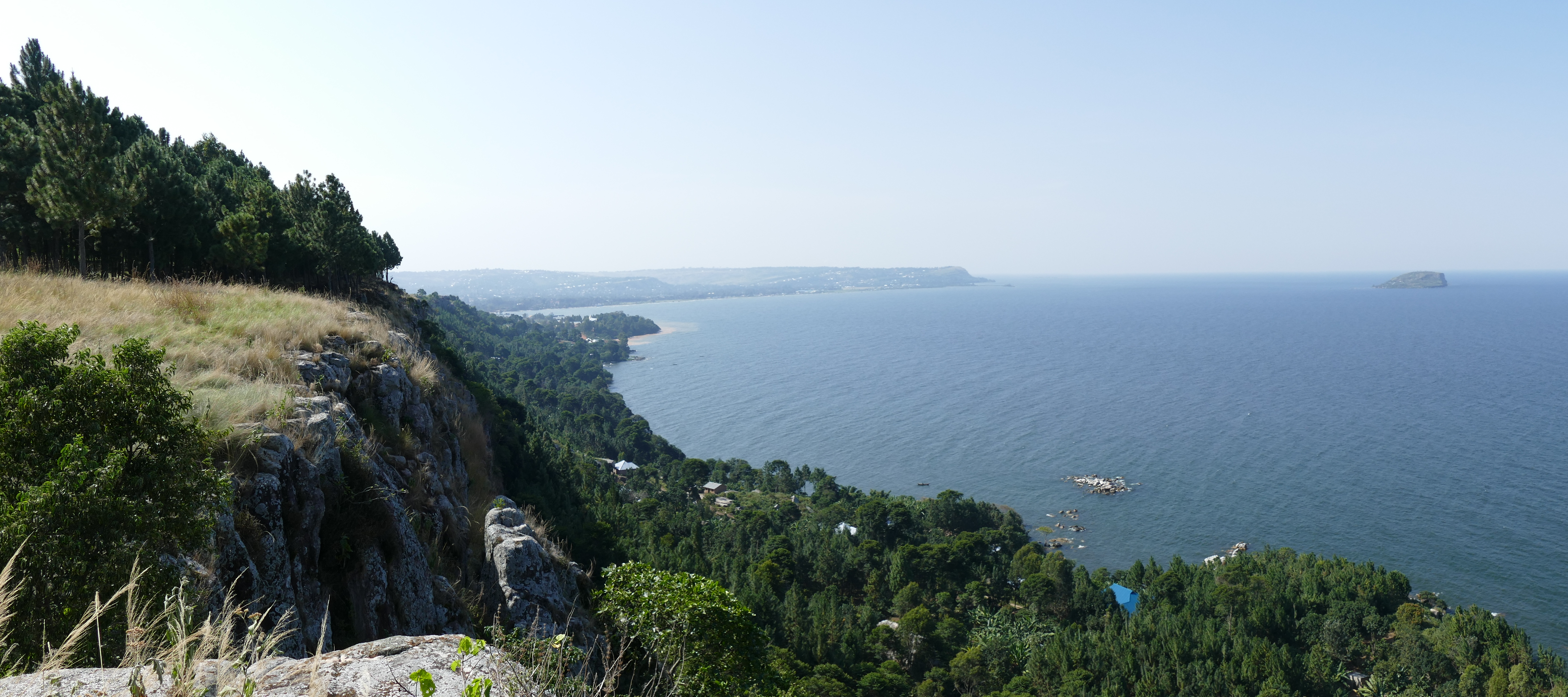
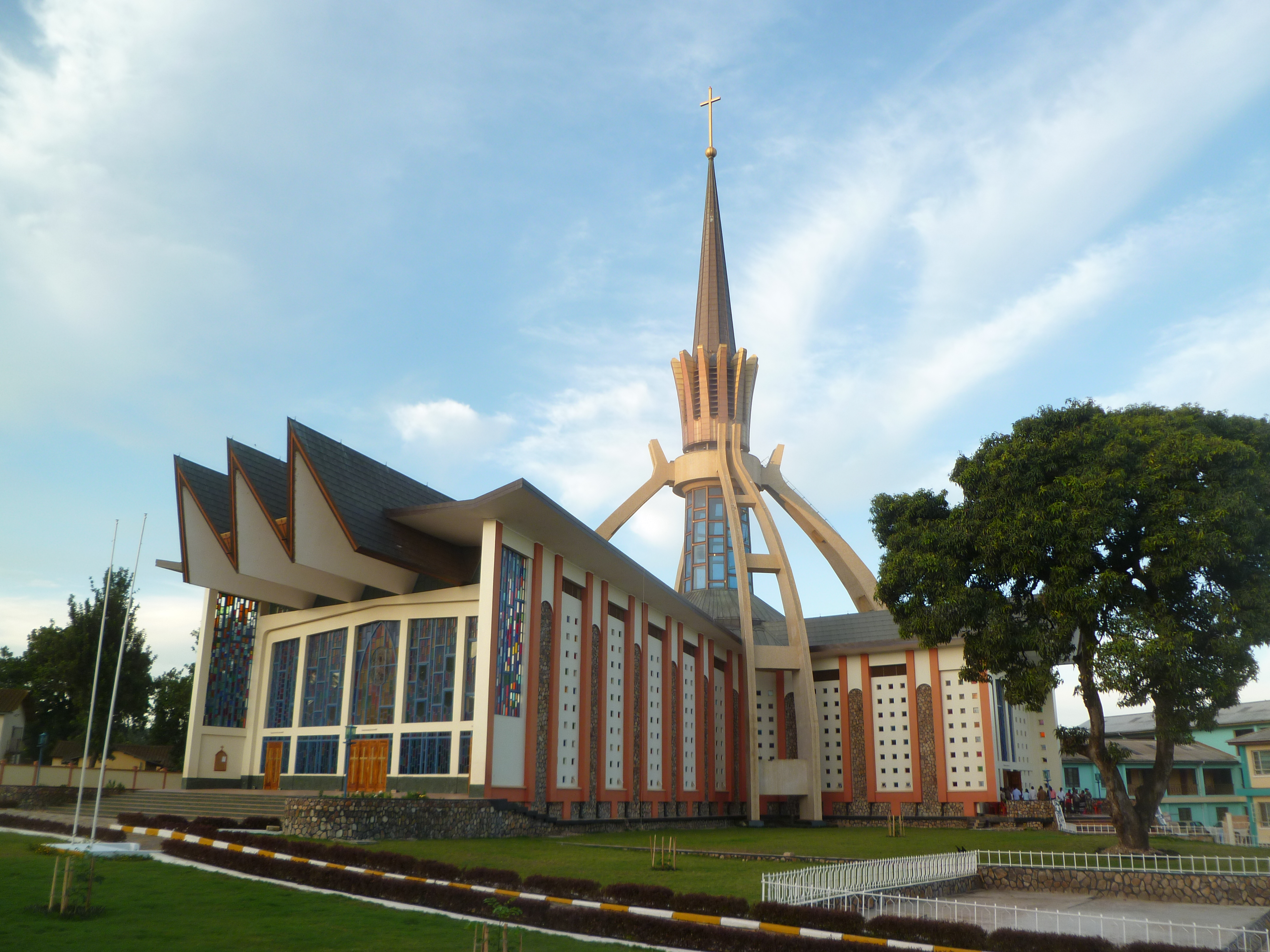
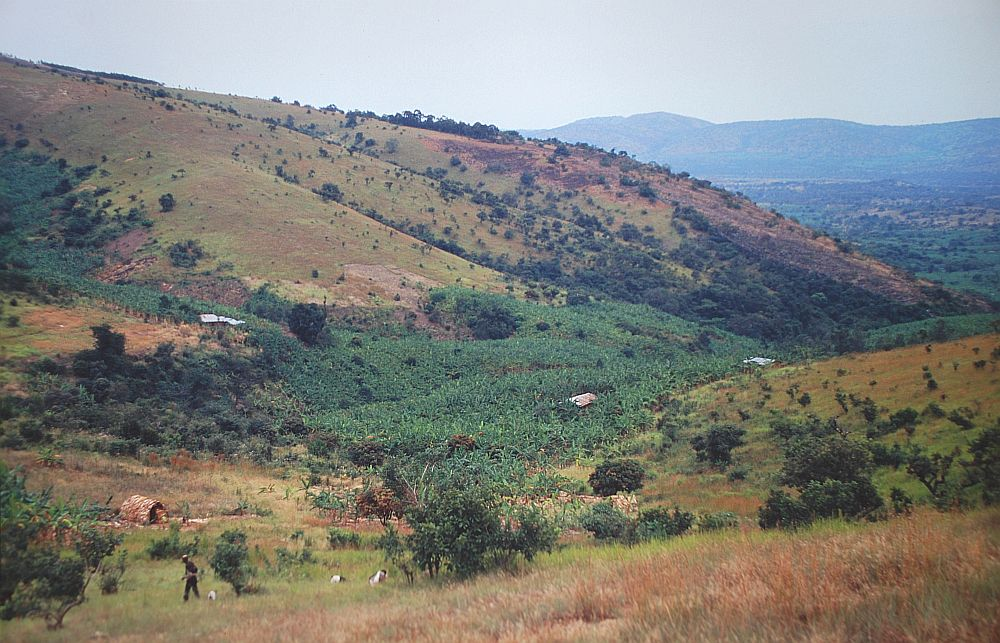
- From top to bottom: Lake Victoria on Kagera's shores, Mater Misericodiae church in Bukoba and scene from Karagwe District
- Nicknames: The land of Kingdoms; Royal Kagera
- Location in Tanzania
- Coordinates: 1°55′S 31°18′E
- Country: Tanzania
- Established: 1961
- Named for: Kagera River
- Capital: Bukoba
- Districts: List: Biharamulo District; Bukoba Rural District; Bukoba Urban District; Karagwe District; Kyerwa District; Missenyi District; Muleba District; Ngara District

Government
  - Regional Commissioner: Fatuma Mwasa

Area
  - Total: 35,686 km^{2} (13,778 sq mi)
  - Land: 25,513 km^{2} (9,851 sq mi)
  - Water: 10,173 km^{2} (3,928 sq mi) 27%
  - Rank: 16 of 31
- Elevation: 1,400 m (4,600 ft)
- Highest elevation (Katerere): 1,917 m (6,289 ft)
- Lowest elevation (Lake Victoria): 1,135 m (3,724 ft)

Population (2016)
  - Total: 2,789,577
  - Rank: 3 of 31
  - Density: 109.34/km^{2} (283.19/sq mi)
- Demonym: Kageran

Ethnic groups
  - Settler: Swahili
  - Native: Wahaya, Wanyambo, Washubi, Wahangaza, Waha, Wazinza & Warongo.
- Time zone: UTC+3 (EAT)
- Postcode: 35xxx
- Area code: 028
- ISO 3166 code: TZ-05
- HDI (2021): 0.521 low · 18th of 25
- Website: Official website
- Symbols of Tanzania
- Bird: Nyanza swift
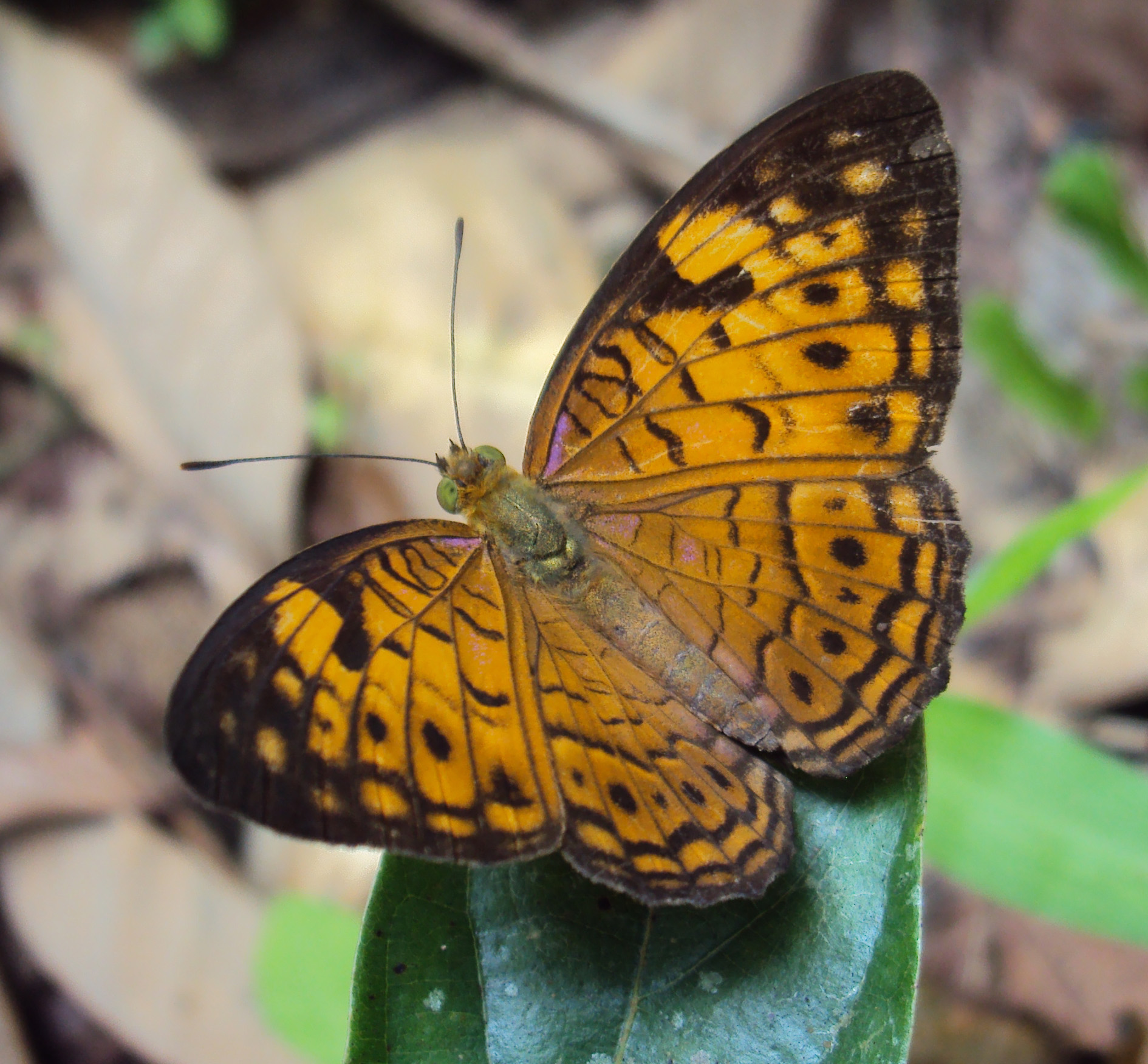
- Butterfly: Phalanta phalantha

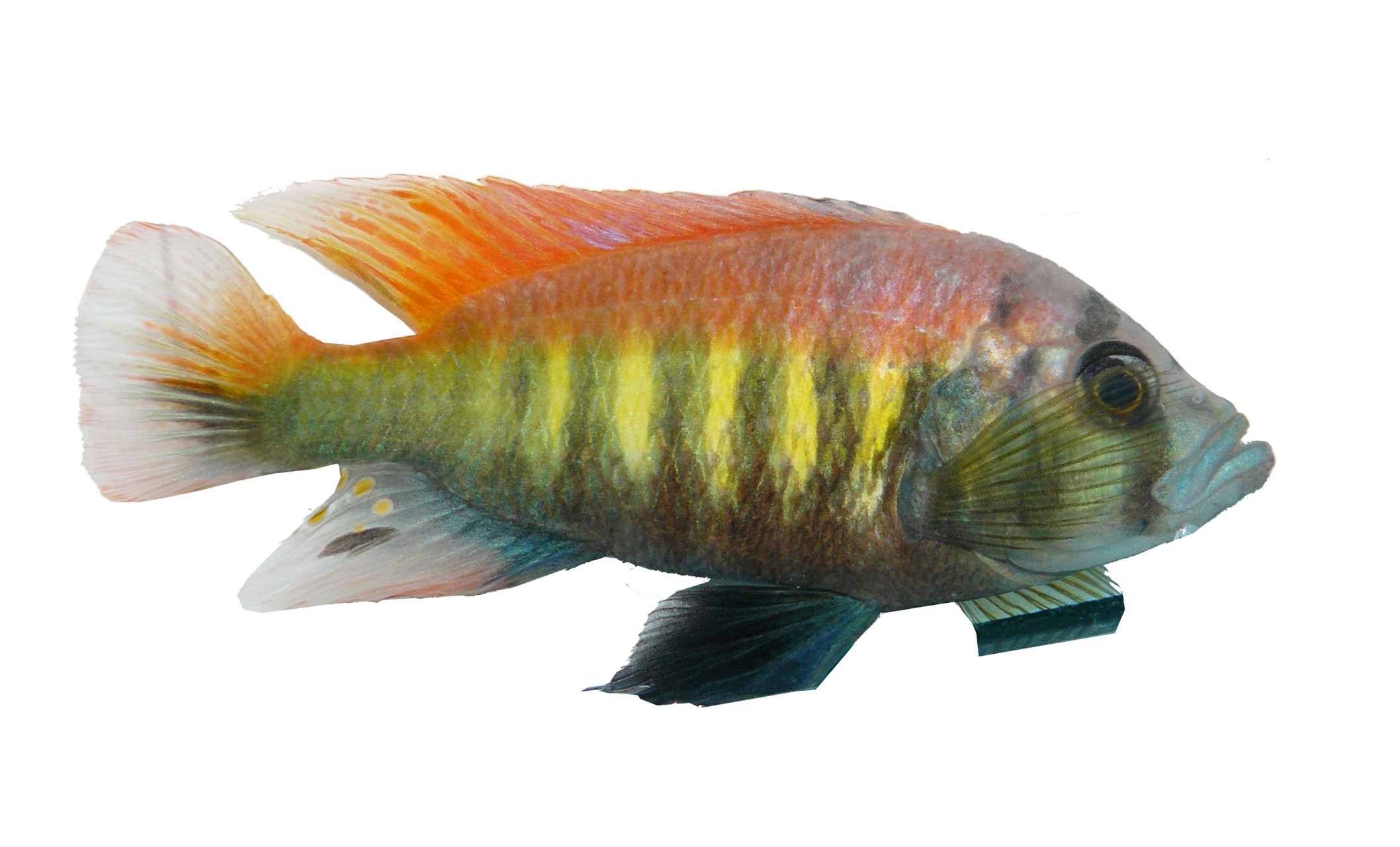
- Fish: Haplochromis nyererei

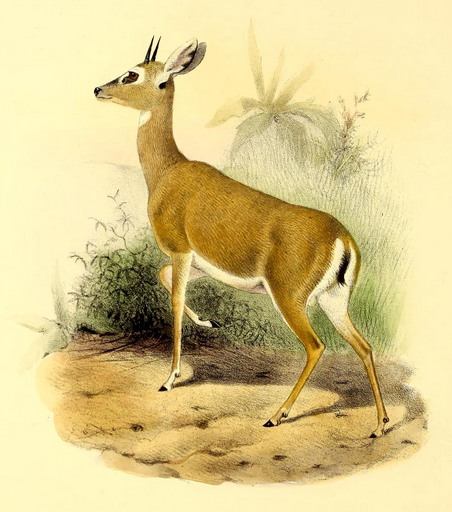
- Mammal: Oribi

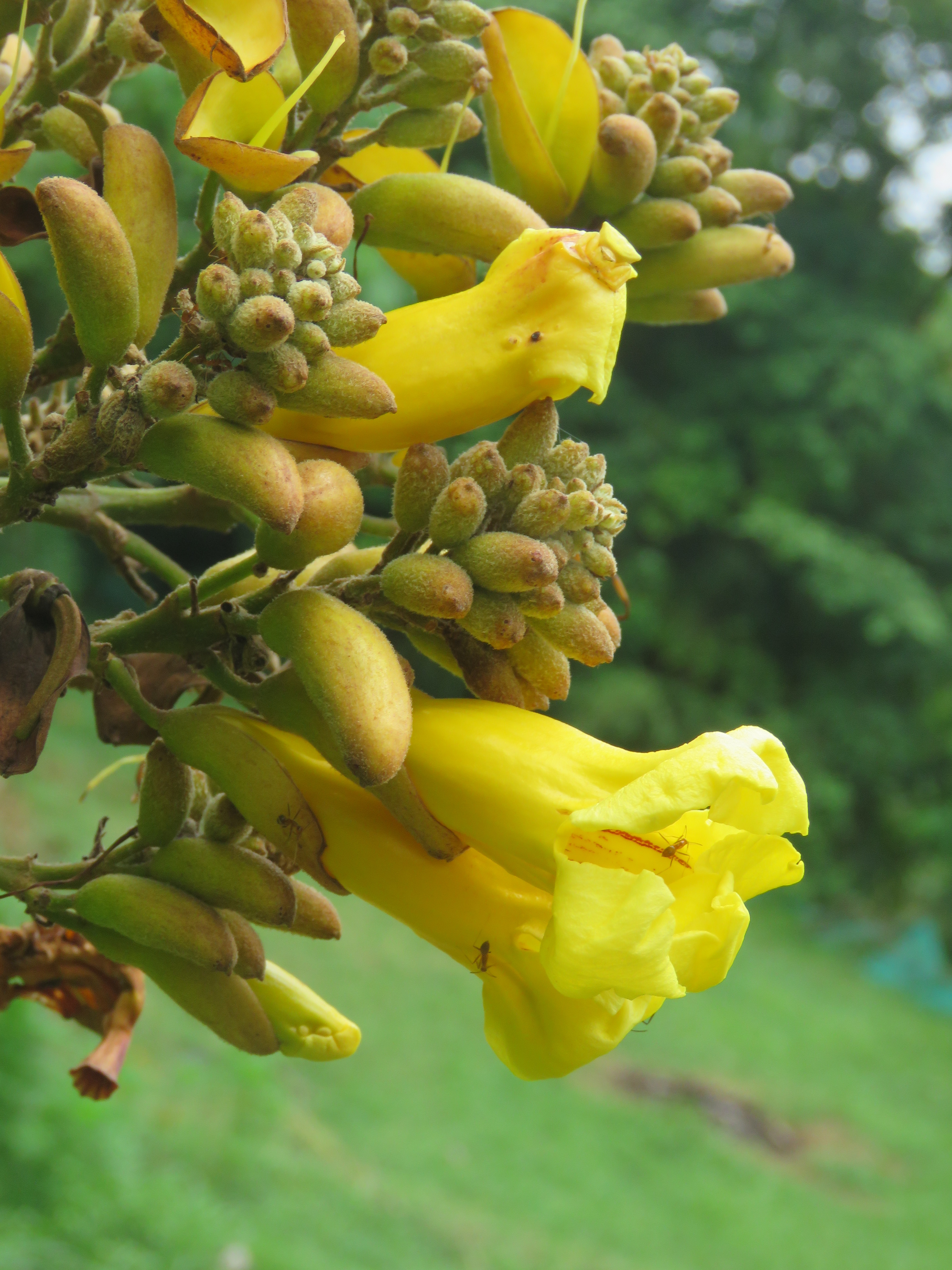
- Tree: Markhamia lutea

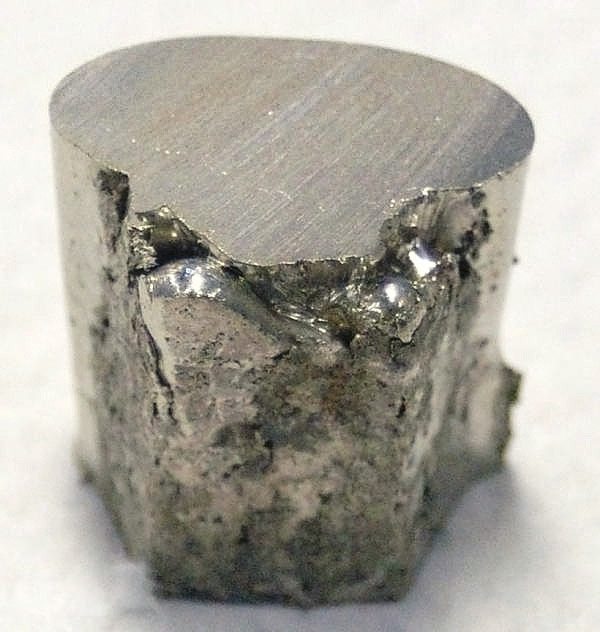
- Mineral: Nickel

Kagera Region (Swahili: Mkoa wa Kagera) is one of Tanzania's 31 administrative regions, with an area of 35,686 km^{2} (13,778 sq mi). Kagera Region is bordered to the east by Lake Victoria, Mwanza Region and Mara Region, to the south by Geita Region and Kigoma Region, to the west by Rwanda and to the north by Uganda and Burundi to the south west. The regional capital city is Bukoba. According to the 2022 national census, the region had a population of 2,989,299, an increase from 2,458,023 in 2012.

== Etymology ==
The region derives its name from the Kagera River.

== Geography ==
Kagera borders Uganda to the north, Rwanda and Burundi to the west, and the Tanzanian regions Kigoma to the south and Geita to the east. The Kagera River forms the region's border with Rwanda. It lies between 30°25' and 32°40' east, and 1°00' and 2°45' south. The total area is 35,686 square kilometres (13,778 sq mi), of which 25,513 square kilometres (9,851 sq mi) is land, and 27 percent, 10,173 square kilometres (3,928 sq mi) is water. Much of the water is Victoria, lake Ikimba, Burigi, Ngono and the Kagera River. Kagera is Tanzania's fifteenth-largest region and accounts for approximately 3.3 percent of Tanzania's land area of 885,800 square kilometres (342,000 sq mi). The regional capital Bukoba is about 1,500 kilometres (930 mi) from Dar es Salaam.

=== Climate ===
Average annual rainfall is 500 to 2000 mm, the Region has a bi-annual rainfall pattern from March to May and from October to November. Rainfall varies from 2000 mm per year in Bukoba to 500 mm to the west, with rainfall higher along Lake Victoria's shore and decreasing away from the lake as well as with elevation. The temperature ranges from 20 °C to 28 °C. The area is covered in hills that run parallel to the lake shore running north to south.

=== Geology ===
Lying on the Kivu Rift, the western of the two branches of the East African Rift which transverses Tanzania, Kagera experiences significant seismic activity. On 10 September 2016, the region was struck by a 5.9 magnitude earthquake in which 17 people died, and at least 250 others were injured.

Kagera is known for its agriculture, lush landscapes, and wildlife. It has reasonably fertile old soils but poor soil management has led to soil exhaustion requiring the use fertiliser.

== Demographics ==
=== Population ===
One of the top five most populous regions in the nation is the Kagera region. According to the population and housing Census of 2002, the region had a total population of 2,033,888, with an average growth rate of 3.1%. 6.0% of all Tanzanians living on the mainland were found in the region.

== History ==
During the colonial period, the region was called West Lake, it was part of Lake Province, which included the Geita, Mwanza, Shinyanga, Tabora, Simiyu, and Mara, regions. After independence Lake Province was broken up, with Kagera and part of Geita becoming the West Lake Region. Following the Kagera War in 1979, the West Lake Region was renamed the Kagera Region.

For a period of about five centuries, Kagera was home to nine different kingdoms with highly hierarchical societies. Before European colonialism, coffee was a traditional crop in the area, used for its stimulant properties and in local cultural rituals. During colonial times, coffee was a cash crop. Bananas were a staple food in the region. Although there was a gender-based division of labour in the traditional Bahaya society, women at the time were not thought to be inferior to men. In fact women commanded special respect in all traditional rituals. For example, upon the death of a family head (Nyin'enju), inheritance rituals were followed, the "Main Inheritor" (Omusika) had to have a female counterpart selected from among his sisters to share his authority. Similarly, upon the death of a reigning king, during the crowning of the next king, there had to be a "sister to the nation" (Kinyany'engoma) who was also selected from among his sisters.

The kings lived in elaborate palaces and were respected as the direct link to gods of their kingdoms. The authority of the nine kingdoms (Kihanja, Karagwe, Kiziba, Misenye, Bugabo, Kyamtwara, Ihangiro, Bukara and Biharamulo) was diminished when Germans colonised Tanzania in 1885 and supported the Haya, the ethnic group of Bukoba and Muleba Districts over the other districts. However, the local kings held on to power. The demise of these kingdoms came after Tanzania gained its independence and president Nyerere considered them detrimental to national unity.

There was a chief called Omukama (the word meant a king or chief) who could be born with that authority. Some prominent chiefs in Kagera include Kyamukuma, who was the last chief in Misenye (currently Missenyi District). Other chiefs included Rumanyika of Karagwe, Ruhinda, Kahigi and other inferior chiefs. Kahigi is among the chiefs who waived their territories by collaborating with German colonialists.

Cultural tours are available for tourists visiting Kagera and can be accessed from the region's capital of Bukoba. These tours include visits to the region's national parks/nature reserves etc.

During German rule Dr. M. Zupitza, then serving as the local medical officer, encountered a plague outbreak in Kiziba (1897–1898). In cooperation with Dr. Robert Koch, he confirmed that the cause was the same bacteria as the outbreak in Bombay.

When authority was transferred to the British after World War I, Kagera was opened to Lutheran missionary activity. Other Christian denominations including the Roman Catholic arrived later. Their legacy is in the many churches in the region.

The attempted annexation of Kagera by Uganda in 1979 triggered the Uganda–Tanzania War.

== Economy ==
Agriculture is the main economic activity, the primary crops being pulses. With Cereals the most frequent crop, at (42.8% of the total area planted with annuals), followed by root and tubers with (17.8%), (2.9%), cash crops (2.1%), and fruits and vegetables with (1.0%). The major cash crops were cotton. Cereal crop output in the area is dominated by maize, with 302,529 households in the region growing maize during the brief wet season. This made up about 93.8% of all households that raised crops during the season.

Food crop sales accounted for 54.0% of smallholder households' total cash income in the Kagera Region, with cash crop sales (18.9%), other sporadic income (8.7%), fishing (4.3%), and wages/salaries (4.3%). Small businesses were the primary source of income for only 3.4% of smallholder households, followed by the sale of livestock (2.5%), cash remittances (2.0%), sales of forest products (0.7%), and sales of animal products (0.6%).

Kagera is also one of the largest coffee producers in the country. Muleba with 26%), Karagwe 23%), Ngara 10%), Biharamulo 1%), and Bukoba Urban 1%) were the other coffee-producing areas, with Bukoba Rural having the highest area 39%). (Map 3.33). However, Ngara (1.23 ha) had the greatest average amount of land planted with coffee per household, followed by Karagwe(0.32 ha), Biharamulo (0.22 ha), Muleba (0.21 ha), Bukoba Rural (0.21 ha), and Bukoba Urban (0.21 ha) (0.18 ha).

=== Wildlife and national parks ===
The Kagera Region has abundant wildlife, including baboons, giraffe, elands, crocodiles, hippopotamus, warthog. Birdlife includes African fish eagles, hammerkops, marabou stork, cormorants. kingfishers, and herons.

Kagera is home to Biharamulo Forest Reserve, Burigi-Chato National Park, Ibanda-Kyerwa National Park, Rumanyika-Karagwe National Park, Rubondo Island National Park and Saanane Island National Park. In 2019, Burigi, Biharamulo game reserve, and Lakes Burigi and Kimis were upgraded to become a national park with the Burigi-Chato National Park. Rumanyika-Karagwe National Park was gazetted as Rumanyika-Karagwe National Park and Ibanda-Kyerwa National Park.

== Administrative divisions ==
=== Districts ===
Kagera Region is divided into eight districts, each administered by a council:

Districts of Kagera
| Map | District | Population (2012) | Area (km^{2}) |
|---|---|---|---|
| | Biharamulo District | 323,486 | 5,627 |
| | Bukoba Rural | 289,697 | |
| | Bukoba Urban | 128,796 | |
| | Karagwe District | 332,020 | 7,716 |
| | Kyerwa District | 321,026 | |
| | Missenyi District | 202,632 | 2,709 |
| | Muleba District | 540,310 | 10,739 |
| | Ngara District | 320,056 | 3,744 |
| | Total | 2,458,023 | 40,838 |

In 2016 the Tanzania National Bureau of Statistics report there were 2,789,577 people in the region, from 2,458,023 in 2012.

== Notable people from Kagera Region ==
- Ali Mufuruki, business man and motivational speaker
- Claver Kamanya, athlete and medalist 400m
- Anna Tibaijuka, politician
- Laurean Rugambwa, Catholic cardinal
- Saida Karoli, musician
- Justinian Rweyemamu, scholar and economist

James Kamala, Journalist
