= Karagwe District =

District of Kagera Region, Tanzania

- District
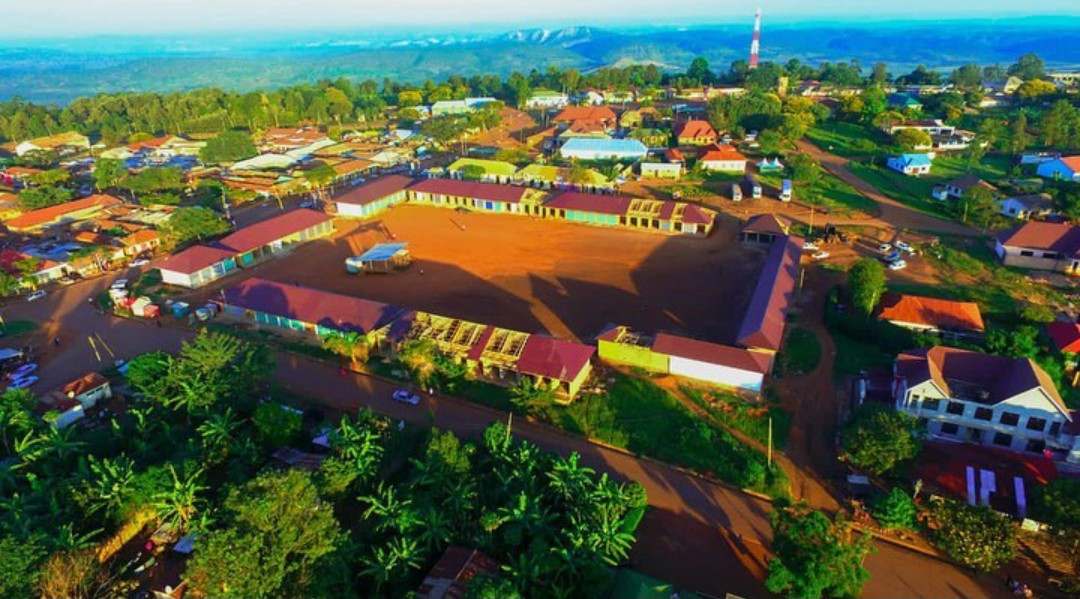
- The Karagwe District.

- Karagwe District of Kagera Region
- Coordinates: 1.5020°S 30.9900°E
- Country: Tanzania
- Region: Kagera Region

Area
  - Total: 5,134 km^{2} (1,982 sq mi)

Population (2022 census)
  - Total: 385,744
  - Density: 75.14/km^{2} (194.6/sq mi)
- Time zone: UTC+3 (EAT)
- Area code: 028
- Website: Regional website

Karagwe is one of the eight districts of the Kagera Region of Tanzania. It is bordered to the north by Uganda, to the east by the Bukoba Rural District, to the southeast by the Muleba District, to the south by the Ngara District and to the west by Republic of Rwanda, from which it is separated by the River Kagera. Small lakes such as the Ikimba, Burigi, Rushwa, and Rwakajunju provide fishing opportunities for residents of the Karagwe District. The district covers and area of 5,134 square kilometres (1,982 sq mi).

== History ==
The present day Karagwe district in Tanzania, was part of a greater kingdom called the Karagwe Kingdom. The Karagwe kingdom was part of the many Great Lakes Kingdoms, in East Africa. Like many other Great Lakes kingdoms, the Karagwe people, known as Abanyambo, claim inheritance from the ancient Kitara empire, ruled by a dynasty known as the Bachwezi.

The first indigenous leader of Karagwe kingdom before the coming of Ruhinda's generation was Nono Marinja (Nono ya Marinja). This indigenous leader was from one of Nyambo clans "Abasiita". His clan was therefore the ruling clan before Hamtik's arrival in this centralized state in the interlacustrine region.

The Karagwe kingdom reached its apex during the 19th century. Archaeological evidence suggests that growth occurred during the early part of the 1800s. King Ndagara came to power around 1820 and ruled until 1853, at which time he was replaced by Rumanyika. The area has strong linguistic and historical ties to the Bugandan states to the north and to central African symbolic forms.

Near the end of the 18th century, Karagwe's prosperity became well known and traders came to barter salt, pepper, oranges, copper, and millet for local goods. Around 1800, beans and cooking bananas were introduced from Uganda. Early in the 1840s, Arabs arrived and trade flourished, especially the slave trade. The cowrie was introduced as hard currency and many new crops were introduced (e.g. sweet banana, tomatoes, maize, cassava, pawpaw, vegetables and citrus fruits).

Throughout the 1890s, Karagwe was ravaged by local wars, epidemics, and pests. The outbreak of rinderpest and smallpox reduced human and livestock population. Tribal wars were eventually settled by the German authorities in Bukoba). Around 1900, commercial coffee growing was introduced by the Germans, which was further developed under British rule. Coffee production was mainly sold in Great Britain. In 1935, coffee processing industries in Bukoba were established by the Indians. During and after the Second World War, the first farmer associations were established and many farmers migrated from Bukoba to Karagwe. During the late 1990s, 165,000 refugees from Rwanda were divided over five camps in the Karagwe District. Other agricultural products that are at its peak are NANASI from Kagutu village, Chanika village, and other places though in a small scale.

== Demographics ==
There are many sub-groups but the main tribe in Karagwe is Nyambo, who call themselves Abanyambo. They can also be referred to as Wanyambo and they speak Runyambo.

According to the 2012 Tanzania National Census, the population of Karagwe District was 332,020, from 424,287 in 2002, and 284,137 in 1988, with a population density of 64.67 inhabitants per square kilometre (167.5/sq mi).

=== Wards ===
Karagwe District is administratively divided into more than 20 wards, these include:

- Bugene
- Bweranyange
- Igurwa
- Ihanda
- Ihembe
- Kanoni
- Kayanga
- Kibondo
- Kihanga
- Kamagambo
- Kiruruma
- Kituntu
- Ndama
- Nyabiyonza
- Nyaishozi
- Nyakahanga
- Nyakakika
- Nyakabanga
- Nyakasimbi
- Rugu

== Transportation ==
To get to the Karagwe region the easiest way is taking a bus. To get around use dalla-dallas (small buses) or piki-pikis (motorbikes)
