= List of MPs elected in the 2015 Tanzania general election =

11th Parliament of Tanzania
| ← | 10th | 12th | → |

Overview
- Legislative body: Parliament of Tanzania
- Jurisdiction: Tanzania
- Meeting place: Parliament House, Dodoma
- Term: 2015–present
- Website: www.parliament.go.tz

National Assembly
- Members: 392
- Speaker: Job Ndugai
- Deputy Speaker: Tulia Ackson
- Prime Minister: Majaliwa K. Majaliwa
- Party control: Chama Cha Mapinduzi

The 11th Parliament of Tanzania was the legislature of Tanzania following the 2015 general election of Members of Parliament (MPs) to the unicameral National Assembly.

== Graphical representation ==
The National Assembly has a total of 392 seats. This includes the 263 directly contested parliamentary constituencies.

| Party key | Chama Cha Mapinduzi (CCM) |
| Party key | Alliance for Change and Transparency (ACT) |
| Party key | National Convention for Construction and Reform – Mageuzi (NCCR–M) |
| Party key | Civic United Front (CUF) |
| Party key | Chama cha Demokrasia na Maendeleo (Chadema) |

↓ 50%
| 188 | 1 | 1 | 32 | 34 |
| Chama Cha Mapinduzi | A | N | CUF | CHADEMA |

== List of MPs elected in the general election ==
| Region | Constituency | Party of incumbent before election | Member returned | Notes |
|---|---|---|---|---|
| Arusha | Arumeru East | Chadema | Joshua Nassari | Seat held |
| Arusha | Arumeru West | Chama Cha Mapinduzi | Gibson Ole Meiseyeki | Seat gain, incumbent Goodluck Ole-Medeye defected to Chadema |
| Arusha | Arusha Urban | Chadema | Godbless Lema | |
| Arusha | Karatu | Chadema | Willy Quambalo | Seat held, incumbent Israel Natse stood down |
| Arusha | Longido | Chama Cha Mapinduzi | Koimerek Onesmo | Seat gain |
| Arusha | Monduli | Chama Cha Mapinduzi | Julius Kalanga | Seat gain, incumbent Edward Lowassa stood down and defected to Chadema |
| Arusha | Ngorongoro | Chama Cha Mapinduzi | Tate Ole Nasha | Seat held, incumbent Kaika Telele failed in the party's primaries |
| Dar es Salaam | Ilala | Chama Cha Mapinduzi | Mussa Zungu | Seat held |
| Dar es Salaam | Kawe | Chadema | Halima Mdee | Seat held |
| Dar es Salaam | Kibamba | Chadema | John Mnyika | New constituency |
| Dar es Salaam | Kigamboni | Chama Cha Mapinduzi | Faustine Ndugulile | Seat held |
| Dar es Salaam | Kinondoni | Chama Cha Mapinduzi | Maulid Mtulia | Seat gain, defeated incumbent Idd Azzan |
| Dar es Salaam | Mbagala | N/A | Ali Mangungu | New constituency |
| Dar es Salaam | Segerea | Chama Cha Mapinduzi | Moses Bonnah | |
| Dar es Salaam | Temeke | Chama Cha Mapinduzi | Ally Abdallah | |
| Dar es Salaam | Ubungo | Chadema | Saed Kubenea | |
| Dar es Salaam | Ukonga | Chama Cha Mapinduzi | Mwita Waitara | |
| Dodoma | Bahi | Chama Cha Mapinduzi | Omary Badwel | |
| Dodoma | Chemba | N/A | Juma Nkamia | New constituency? |
| Dodoma | Chilonwa | Chama Cha Mapinduzi | Joel Mwaka | |
| Dodoma | Dodoma Urban | Chama Cha Mapinduzi | Anthony Mavunde | |
| Dodoma | Kibakwe | Chama Cha Mapinduzi | George Simbachawene | |
| Dodoma | Kondoa | N/A | Ashatu Kijaji | Previously Kondoa North/Kondoa South |
| Dodoma | Kondoa Urban | N/A | Edwin Sannda | Previously Kondoa North/Kondoa South |
| Dodoma | Kongwa | Chama Cha Mapinduzi | Job Ndugai | |
| Dodoma | Mpwapwa | Chama Cha Mapinduzi | George Lubeleje | |
| Dodoma | Mtera | Chama Cha Mapinduzi | Livingstone Lusinde | |
| Geita | Bukombe | N/A | Doto Biteko | New constituency. Geita Region Founded in 2012 |
| Geita | Busanda | N/A | Lolesia Bukwimba | New constituency. Geita Region Founded in 2012 |
| Geita | Chato | N/A | Matogolo Kalemani (Dr) | New constituency in Geita Region Founded in 2012. Previously in Kagera. |
| Geita | Geita | N/A | Joseph Musukuma | New constituency. Geita Region Founded in 2012 |
| Geita | Geita Urban | N/A | Constantine Kanyasu | New constituency. Geita Region Founded in 2012 |
| Geita | Mbogwe | N/A | Manyanda Augustino | New constituency. Geita Region Founded in 2012 |
| Geita | Nyang'hwale | N/A | Nassor Hussein | New constituency. Geita Region Founded in 2012 |
| Iringa | Iringa Urban | Chadema | Simon Msigwa | |
| Iringa | Ismani | Chama Cha Mapinduzi | Vangimembe Lukuvi | |
| Iringa | Kalenga | Chama Cha Mapinduzi | Godfrey Mgimwa | |
| Iringa | Kilolo | Chama Cha Mapinduzi | Methusalah Venance | |
| Iringa | Mafinga Urban | N/A | Cosato Chumi | New constituency? |
| Iringa | Mufindi North | Chama Cha Mapinduzi | Hassan Mgimwa | |
| Iringa | Mufindi South | Chama Cha Mapinduzi | Mendrad Kigola | |
| Kagera | Biharamulo West | Chadema | Rwegasira Oscar | |
| Kagera | Bukoba Urban | Chadema | Wilfred Lwakatare | |
| Kagera | Bukoba Rural | Chama Cha Mapinduzi | Jason Rweikiza | |
| Kagera | Karagwe | Chama Cha Mapinduzi | Innocent Bashungwa | |
| Kagera | Kyerwa | Chama Cha Mapinduzi | Sebba Innocent | |
| Kagera | Muleba North | Chama Cha Mapinduzi | John Charles | |
| Kagera | Muleba South | Chama Cha Mapinduzi | Anna Tibaijuka (Prof.) | |
| Kagera | Ngara | Chama Cha Mapinduzi | Alex Gashaza | |
| Kagera | Nkenge | Chama Cha Mapinduzi | Diodorus Kamala | |
| Katavi | Katavi | Chama Cha Mapinduzi | Aloyce Isack | |
| Katavi | Kavuu | N/A | Pudenciana Kikwembe | New Constituency after Katavi region founded in 2012. |
| Katavi | Mpanda Urban | Chadema | Sebastian Kapufi | Previously constituency in Rukwa Region. |
| Katavi | Mpanda Rural | Chama Cha Mapinduzi | Selemani Kakoso | Previously constituency in Rukwa Region. |
| Katavi | Nsimbo | N/A | Richard Mbogo | New Constituency after Katavi region founded in 2012. |
| Kigoma | Buhingwe | N/A | Albert Obama | |
| Kigoma | Buyungu | Chama Cha Mapinduzi | Kasuku Bilago | |
| Kigoma | Kasulu Urban | NCCR–Mageuzi | Daniel Nsanzugwanko | |
| Kigoma | Kasulu Rural | NCCR–Mageuzi | Holle Vuma | |
| Kigoma | Kigoma Urban | Chama Cha Mapinduzi | Kabwe Zitto | |
| Kigoma | Kigoma North | Chadema | Joseph Peter | |
| Kigoma | Kigoma South | NCCR–Mageuzi | Hasna Sudi | |
| Kigoma | Muhambwe | NCCR–Mageuzi | Justus Atashasta (Eng.) | |
| Kilimanjaro | Hai | Chadema | Freeman Mbowe | |
| Kilimanjaro | Moshi Urban | Chadema | Raphael Japhary | |
| Kilimanjaro | Moshi Rural | Chadema | Anthony Komu | |
| Kilimanjaro | Mwanga | Chama Cha Mapinduzi | Jumanne Maghembe (Prof.) | |
| Kilimanjaro | Rombo | Chadema | Joseph Selasini Shao | |
| Kilimanjaro | Same East | Chadema | Naghenjwa Kaboyoka | |
| Kilimanjaro | Same West | Chama Cha Mapinduzi | Mathayo David (Dr.) | |
| Kilimanjaro | Siha | Chama Cha Mapinduzi | Oloyce Mollel (Dr.) | |
| Kilimanjaro | Vunjo | NCCR-Mageuzi | James Mbatia | |
| Lindi | Lindi Urban | CUF | Hassani Kaunje | |
| Lindi | Liwale | Chama Cha Mapinduzi | Zuberi Kuchauka | |
| Lindi | Kilwa North | Chama Cha Mapinduzi | Vedasto Ngombale | |
| Lindi | Kilwa South | CUF | Selemani Bungara | |
| Lindi | Mchinga | Chama Cha Mapinduzi | Hamidu Bobali | |
| Lindi | Mtama | Chama Cha Mapinduzi | Moses Nape | |
| Lindi | Nachingwea | Chama Cha Mapinduzi | Hassani Masala | |
| Lindi | Ruangwa | Chama Cha Mapinduzi | Kassim Majaliwa | |
| Manyara | Babati Urban | Chama Cha Mapinduzi | Pauline Gekul | |
| Manyara | Babati Rural | Chama Cha Mapinduzi | Jitu Soni | |
| Manyara | Hanang District | Chama Cha Mapinduzi | Mary Nagu (Dr.) | |
| Manyara | Kiteto | Chama Cha Mapinduzi | Emmanuel Papian | |
| Manyara | Mbulu Urban | Chadema | Zacharia Issaay | Mbulu constituency split into Mbulu Urban and Mbulu Rural |
| Manyara | Mbulu Rural | Chadema | Gregory Flatei | Mbulu constituency split into Mbulu Urban and Mbulu Rural |
| Manyara | Simanjiro | Chama Cha Mapinduzi | James Millya | |
| Mara | Butiama | Chama Cha Mapinduzi | Nimrod Mkono | New Constituency |
| Mara | Bunda | Chama Cha Mapinduzi | Mwita Boniphace | |
| Mara | Bunda Urban | Chama Cha Mapinduzi | Amos Bulaya | |
| Mara | Musoma Urban | Chadema | Mathayo Vedastus | |
| Mara | Musoma Rural | Chama Cha Mapinduzi | Sospeter Muhongo (Prof.) | |
| Mara | Mwibara | Chama Cha Mapinduzi | Alphaxard Kangi | |
| Mara | Rorya | Chama Cha Mapinduzi | Okambo Lakek | |
| Mara | Serengeti | Chama Cha Mapinduzi | Ryoba Marwa | |
| Mara | Tarime Urban | Chama Cha Mapinduzi | Esther Matiko | Previously Tarime constituency. Split into Tarime Urban/Rural. |
| Mara | Tarime Rural | Chama Cha Mapinduzi | John Wegesa Heche | Previously Tarime constituency. Split into Tarime Urban/Rural. |
| Mbeya | Busokelo | N/A | Atupele Mwakibete | New Constituency |
| Mbeya | Ileje | Chama Cha Mapinduzi | Janet Mbene | |
| Mbeya | Kyela | Chama Cha Mapinduzi | Harrison Mwakyembe | |
| Mbeya | Lupa | Chama Cha Mapinduzi | Victor Mwambalaswa | |
| Mbeya | Mbarali | Chama Cha Mapinduzi | Mulla Haroon | |
| Mbeya | Mbeya Urban | Chadema | Osmund Mbilinyi | |
| Mbeya | Mbeya Rural | Chama Cha Mapinduzi | Manase Oran | |
| Mbeya | Mbozi | Chadema | Paschal Haonga | Mbozi East and Mbozi West merged |
| Mbeya | Momba | N/A | David Silinde | New Constituency |
| Mbeya | Rungwe | Chama Cha Mapinduzi | Henry Saul | Rungwe East and Rungwe West merged |
| Mbeya | Songwe | Chama Cha Mapinduzi | Philipo Mulugo | |
| Mbeya | Tunduma Urban | N/A | Frank Mwakajoka | New Constituency |
| Mbeya | Vwawa | N/A | Japhet Hasunga | New Constituency |
| Morogoro | Gairo | Chama Cha Mapinduzi | Ahmed Shabiby | |
| Morogoro | Kilombero | Chama Cha Mapinduzi | Peter Lijualikali | |
| Morogoro | Kilosa | Chama Cha Mapinduzi | Salim Bwazir | |
| Morogoro | Malinyi | N/A | H. Hussen Mponda (Dr.) | New Constituency |
| Morogoro | Mikumi | Chama Cha Mapinduzi | Joseph Haule | |
| Morogoro | Mlimba | N/A | Susan Kiwanga | New Constituency |
| Morogoro | Morogoro Urban | Chama Cha Mapinduzi | Abdul Aziz Abood | |
| Morogoro | Morogoro South | Chama Cha Mapinduzi | Prosper Mbena | |
| Morogoro | Morogoro South East | Chama Cha Mapinduzi | Tegweta Mbumba | |
| Morogoro | Mvomero | Chama Cha Mapinduzi | Ahmed Suleiman | |
| Mtwara | Mtwara Urban | Chama Cha Mapinduzi | Abdallah Maftah | |
| Mtwara | Mtwara Rural | Chama Cha Mapinduzi | Hawa Ghasia | |
| Mtwara | Nanyamba | Chama Cha Mapinduzi | Abdallah Chikota | |
| Mtwara | Nanyumbu | Chama Cha Mapinduzi | William Dua | |
| Mtwara | Ndanda | N/A | David Mwambe | New constituency |
| Mtwara | Newala Urban | Chama Cha Mapinduzi | George Mkuchika | Split from Newala constituency |
| Mtwara | Newala Rural | Chama Cha Mapinduzi | Rashidi Akbar | Split from Newala constituency |
| Mtwara | Tandahimba | Chama Cha Mapinduzi | Ahmad Katani | |
| Mwanza | Buchosa | Chama Cha Mapinduzi | Charles Tizeba | |
| Mwanza | Ilemela | Chadema | Sylvester Angaline | |
| Mwanza | Kwimba | Chama Cha Mapinduzi | Shanif Mansoor | |
| Mwanza | Magu | Chama Cha Mapinduzi | Boniventura Kiswaga | |
| Mwanza | Misungwi | Chama Cha Mapinduzi | Charles Kitwanga | |
| Mwanza | Nyamagana | Chadema | Stanslaus Mabula | |
| Mwanza | Sengerema | Chama Cha Mapinduzi | William Ngeleja | |
| Mwanza | Sumve | Chama Cha Mapinduzi | Richard Ndassa | |
| Mwanza | Ukerewe | Chama Cha Mapinduzi | Joseph Mkundi | |
| Njombe | Lupembe | N/A | Joram Hongoli | New Constituency. Njombe region formed in 2012. |
| Njombe | Makete | Chama Cha Mapinduzi | Adamson Norman | |
| Njombe | Njombe Urban | Chama Cha Mapinduzi | Franz Mwalongo | |
| Njombe | Wanging'ombe | N/A | Gerson Lwenge (Eng.) | New Constituency. Njombe region formed in 2012. |
| Njombe | Makambako | Chama Cha Mapinduzi | Kasenyenda Deo | |
| Pwani | Bagamoyo | Chama Cha Mapinduzi | Shukuru Kawambwa | |
| Pwani | Chalinze | Chama Cha Mapinduzi | Ridhiwani Kikwete | |
| Pwani | Kibaha Urban | Chama Cha Mapinduzi | Silyvestry Koka | |
| Pwani | Kibaha Rural | Chama Cha Mapinduzi | Abuu Hamoud | |
| Pwani | Kibiti | Chama Cha Mapinduzi | Seif Ally | |
| Pwani | Kisarawe | Chama Cha Mapinduzi | Selemani Jafo | |
| Pwani | Mafia | Chama Cha Mapinduzi | Mbaraka Dau | |
| Pwani | Mkuranga | Chama Cha Mapinduzi | Abdallah Ulega | |

== List of appointed/nominated MPs ==
The following is a list of MPs appointed to special seats, or nominated by the President.

Nominated
| Member | Party | Notes |
|---|---|---|
| Abdallah Bulembo | Chama Cha Mapinduzi | |

Appointed
| Member | Party | Notes |
|---|---|---|
| Anastazia Wambura | Chama Cha Mapinduzi | |
