= Nyakato =

Ward in Mwanza, Tanzania

Nyakato Kata ya Nyakato
- Ward
- Location within Tanzania
- Coordinates: 2.525°S 32.945°E
- Country: Tanzania
- Region: Mwanza Region
- District: Ilemela District
- Ward: Nyakato

Government
  - District Executive Director: John P. Wanga
  - MP: Angeline Mabula
  - Mayor: Renatus Bahame Mulunga
  - Councilor: Wambura Alfred Wambura

Population (2016)
  - Total: 27,736
- Time zone: UTC+3 (EAT)
- Postcode: 33201

Nyakato is an administrative Ward in Ilemela District, Mwanza Region, Tanzania. In 2016 the Tanzania National Bureau of Statistics report there were 127,736 people in the ward, from 82,348 in 2012 when Nyamagana District split.
