= Nyamanoro =

Ward in Mwanza, Tanzania

Nyamanoro Kata ya Nyamanoro
- Ward
- Location within Tanzania
- Coordinates: 2.4924125°S 32.9083714°E
- Country: Tanzania
- Region: Mwanza Region
- District: Ilemela District
- Ward: Nyamanoro

Government
  - District Executive Director: John P. Wanga
  - MP: Angeline Mabula
  - Mayor: Renatus Bahame Mulunga
  - Councilor: Abukar Mwombeki

Population (2016)
  - Total: 27,010
- Time zone: UTC+3 (EAT)

Nyamanoro is an administrative ward in Ilemela District, Mwanza Region, Tanzania. In 2016 the Tanzania National Bureau of Statistics report there were 27,010 people in the ward, from 51,456 in 2012 when Nyamagana District split.
