= Nyasaka =

Nyasaka ward
- Location within Tanzania
- Coordinates: 02°30′00″S 32°56′00″E
- Country: Tanzania
- Region: Mwanza
- District: Ilemela
- Leadership: legislature

Government
  - Type: District Council
  - District Executive Director: John P. Wanga
  - MP: Angeline Mabula
  - Mayor: Renatus Bahame Mulunga
  - Councilor: Shaban Ramadhani Maganga
- Time zone: UTC+03 (Greenwich Mean Time)
  - Summer (DST): UTC+03

Nyasaka is an administrative ward in Ilemela District, Mwanza Region, Tanzania with a postcode number 33214. In the national census of 2002, the ward had a total population of 27,356. This was before the split from Nyamagana District on 1 October 2012, when Ilemela became a District Council with a total of 20 wards and in the National Census of 2012, the district had a population of 265,911.
