= Buzuruga =

Ward in Ilemela, Mwanza, Tanzania

Buzuruga Kata ya Buzuruga
- Ward
- Location within Tanzania Location within Africa
- Coordinates: 02°31′52″S 32°56′27″E
- Country: Tanzania
- Region: Mwanza Region
- District: Ilemela District
- Ward: Buzuruga

Government
  - District Executive Director: John P. Wanga
  - MP: Angeline Mabula
  - Mayor: Renatus Bahame Mulunga
  - Councilor: Richard Madaha Machemba

Population (2016)
  - Total: 22,410
- Time zone: UTC+3 (EAT)
- Postcode: 33213

Buzuruga is an Ward in Ilemela District, Mwanza Region, Tanzania with a postcode number 33213. In 2016 the Tanzania National Bureau of Statistics report there were 22,410 people in the ward.

== Villages ==
The ward has 5 villages.

- Buzuruga Kaskazini
- Buzuruga Kusini
- Nyambiti
- Ustawi
- Buzuruga Mashariki
