= Buswelu =

Ward in Ilemela, Mwanza, Tanzania

Buswelu Kata ya Buswelu
- Ward
- Location within Tanzania Location within Africa
- Coordinates: 02°30′55″S 32°58′27″E
- Country: Tanzania
- Region: Mwanza Region
- District: Ilemela District
- Ward: Buswelu

Government
  - District Executive Director: Kiomoni kibamba
  - MP: Angeline Mabula
  - Mayor: Renatus Bahame Mulunga
  - Councilor: Sarah Paul Ng'hwani

Population (2016)
  - Total: 18,363
- Time zone: UTC+3 (EAT)
- Postcode: 33204

Buswelu is an administrative ward in Ilemela District in Mwanza Region, Tanzania with a postcode number 33204. In 2016 the Tanzania National Bureau of Statistics report there were 18,363 people in the ward, from 22,897 in 2012.

== Villages ==
The ward has 11 villages.

- Bujingwa
- Buswelu A
- Buswelu B
- Buhyila
- Bulola A
- Bulola B
- Busenga
- Zembwela
- Bulola Mlimani
- Majengo Mapya
- Kigala
