= Kirumba =

Ward in Mwanza, Tanzania

Kirumba Kata ya Kirumba
- Ward
- Location within Tanzania
- Coordinates: 2.50154798°S 32.89266307°E
- Country: Tanzania
- Region: Mwanza Region
- District: Ilemela District
- Ward: Kirumba

Government
  - Type: District Council
  - District Executive Director: John P. Wanga
  - MP: Angeline Mabula
  - Mayor: Renatus Bahame Mulunga
  - Councilor: Alex Timothy Ngussa

Population (2016)
  - Total: 31,656
- Time zone: UTC+3 (EAT)
- Postcode: 33221

Kurumba is an administrative ward in Ilemela District, Mwanza Region, Tanzania. In 2016 the Tanzania National Bureau of Statistics report there were 31,656 people in the ward, from 28,103 in 2012.

== Villages ==
The ward has 13 villages.

- Kirumba Kati
- Ngara
- Kabohoro
- Ibanda Juu
- Ibanda Ziwani
- Mlimani
- Kigoto
- Ibanda Busisi
- Kabuhoro B
- kiyungi
- Magomeni
- Mlimani B

== Notable people ==
- Witness-Patchelly Kambale Musonia
