= William Shija =

Tanzanian politician

Dr William F. Shija

6th Secretary General of the Commonwealth Parliamentary Association
- In office 1 January 2007 – 4 October 2014
- Preceded by: Denis Marshall
- Succeeded by: Karimulla Akbar Khan

Member of Parliament for Sengerema
- In office 1990–2005
- Succeeded by: William Ngeleja

Personal details
- Born: 28 April 1947 Tanganyika
- Died: 4 October 2014 (aged 67) London, United Kingdom
- Resting place: Sengerema, Tanzania
- Party: CCM
- Spouse: Getruda Peter Shija
- Children: 5
- Education: Howard University (PhD)

William Ferdinand Shija (28 April 1947 – 4 October 2014) was a Tanzanian politician and the former Secretary General of the Commonwealth Parliamentary Association between 2007 and 2014. He had also served as a member of the African Union's Pan-African Parliament.

== Early life and career ==
Shija was born in Nyampande village in Sengerema District of Mwanza Region. Before entering politics, Shija worked as a civil servant and a teacher. After receiving higher education in India and the United States, he taught communications in Tanzania.

== Politics ==
Shija was a member of the National Assembly of Tanzania from 1990 to 2005. During this time he held the positions of Minister for Science, Technology and Higher Education; Minister for Information and Broadcasting; Minister for Energy and Minerals; and Minister for Industries and Trade. He was a member of the Pan-African Parliament in 2004 and 2005 and chaired the Committee on Education, Culture, Tourism and Human Resources. He was appointed the first African Secretary-General of the Commonwealth Parliamentary Association on September 9, 2006 and took up the position on 1 January 2007. His term lasted until 2014.

== Personal life ==
Shija was married with five children. When he assumed the post of Secretary-General of the CPA, he lived in London. Dr. Shija was a patron for a Welsh based charity that works extensively in Tanzania.

== Death ==
He died on 4 October 2014 in London. He was buried in his home village of Nyampande in Sengerema District, Mwanza Region.
