= Kitangiri =

Ward in Ilemela, Mwanza, Tanzania

Kitangiri Kata ya Kitangiri
- Ward
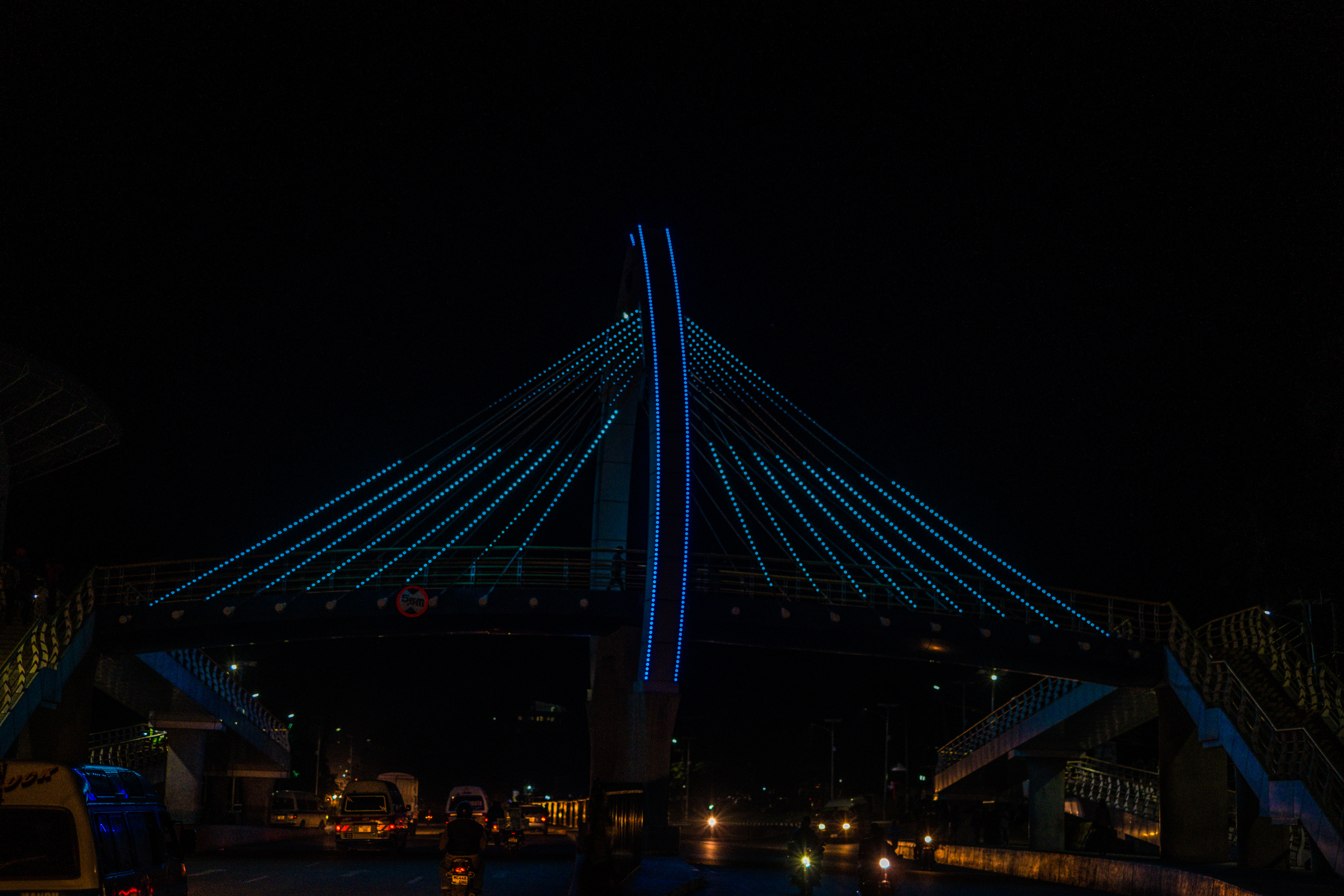
- Night view of Furahisha bridge which is located near the rock city mall in Kitangiri.

- Location within Tanzania
- Coordinates: 2.484705°S 32.889161°E
- Country: Tanzania
- Region: Mwanza Region
- District: Ilemela District
- Ward: Kitangiri

Government
  - District Executive Director: John P. Wanga
  - MP: Angeline Mabula
  - Mayor: Renatus Bahame Mulunga
  - Councilor: John Mwita Nyamuhanga

Population (2016)
  - Total: 23,432
- Time zone: UTC+3 (EAT)
- Postcode: 33220

Kitangiri is an administrative ward in Ilemela District, Mwanza Region, Tanzania. In 2002, the ward had a total population of 14,282 according to the national Census of 2002 this was before split from Nyamagana District on 1 October 2012 as Ilemela becomes a District Council where given total of 20 wards. In 2016 the Tanzania National Bureau of Statistics report there were 23,432 people in the ward, from 20,802 in 2012.

== Villages ==
The ward has 8 villages.

- Jiwe Kuu
- Kitangiri Kati
- Kitangiri A
- Kitangiri B
- Medical Research
- Mihama
- Kileleni
- Mwinuko
