= Ilemela Ward =

Ward in Ilemela, Mwanza, Tanzania

Ilemela Ward Kata ya Ilemela Ward
- Ward
- Location within Tanzania Location within Africa
- Coordinates: 02°28′25″S 32°54′42″E
- Country: Tanzania
- Region: Mwanza Region
- District: Ilemela District
- Ward: Ilemela Ward

Government
  - District Executive Director: John P. Wanga
  - MP: Angeline Mabula
  - Mayor: Renatus Bahame Mulunga
  - Councilor: Willbard Rutalemwa Kilenzi

Population (2016)
  - Total: 25,240
- Time zone: UTC+3 (EAT)
- Postcode: 33205

Ilemela is an Ward and the headquarter of the Ilemela District in the Mwanza Region of Tanzania with a postcode number 33205. In 2016 the Tanzania National Bureau of Statistics report there were 25,240 people in the ward, from 43,244 in 2012.

== Villages ==
The ward has 9 villages.

- Ilemela
- Balyeheye
- Nyangungulu
- Bukengwa
- Kahasa
- Mwambani
- Butuja
- Sabasaba
- Madukulu
