= Bugogwa =

Ward in Ilemela, Mwanza, Tanzania

Bugogwa Kata ya Bugogwa
- Ward
- Location within Tanzania Location within Africa
- Coordinates: 2.4330647°S 32.970477°E
- Country: Tanzania
- Region: Mwanza Region
- District: Ilemela District
- Ward: Bugogwa

Government
  - MP: Angeline Mabula
  - Mayor: Renatus Bahame Mulunga
  - Councilor: William Steven Mashamba

Population (2016)
  - Total: 32,925
- Time zone: UTC+3 (EAT)
- Postcode: 33207

Bugogwa is an administrative ward in Ilemela District, Mwanza Region, Tanzania with a postcode number 33207. In 2016 the Tanzania National Bureau of Statistics report there were 32,925 people in the ward, from 37,312 in 2012.

== Villages ==
The ward has 15 villages.

- Igombe A
- Bugogwa
- Lugezi
- Kabangaja
- Kasamwa
- Igombe B
- Kigote
- Kilabela
- Bujimwa
- Kayenze Ndogo
- Kisundi
- Isanzu
- Igogwe
- Nkoroto
- Kilimanilwe Mtemi
