= Sangabuye =

Sangabuye ward
- Location within Tanzania
- Coordinates: 02°23′02″S 33°02′32″E
- Country: Tanzania
- Region: Mwanza
- District: Ilemela
- Leadership: legislature

Government
  - Type: District Council
  - District Executive Director: John P. Wanga
  - MP: Angeline Mabula
  - Mayor: Renatus Bahame Mulunga
  - Councilor: Renatus Bahebe Mulunga
- Time zone: UTC+03 (Greenwich Mean Time)
  - Summer (DST): UTC+03

Sangabuye is an administrative ward in Ilemela District, Mwanza Region, Tanzania with a postcode number 33209. As of 2002, the ward had a total population of 8,935 according to the national Census of 2002 this was before split from Nyamagana District on 1 October 2012 as Ilemela becomes a District Council where given total of 20 wards, and for the whole District had 265911 comparing with the National Census of 2012
