= Nyamhongolo =

Ward in Mwanza, Tanzania

Nyamhongolo Kata ya Nyamhongolo
- Ward
- Location within Tanzania
- Coordinates: 2.532°S 33.005°E
- Country: Tanzania
- Region: Mwanza Region
- District: Ilemela District
- Ward: Nyamhongolo

Government
  - District Executive Director: John P. Wanga
  - MP: Angeline Mabula
  - Mayor: Renatus Bahame Mulunga
  - Councilor: Andrea Anthony Nginila

Population (2016)
  - Total: 7,429
- Time zone: UTC+3 (EAT)

Nyamhongolo is an Ward in Ilemela District, Mwanza Region, Tanzania.In 2016 the Tanzania National Bureau of Statistics report there were 7,429 people in the ward.

In 2021 the new bus terminal for Mwanza was finished in Nyamongoro.
