= Shibula =

Ward in Mwanza, Tanzania

Shibula Kata ya Shibula
- Ward
- Location within Tanzania
- Coordinates: 2.4469447°S 32.968106°E
- Country: Tanzania
- Region: Mwanza Region
- District: Ilemela District
- Ward: Shibula

Government
  - District Executive Director: John P. Wanga
  - MP: Angeline Mabula
  - Mayor: Renatus Bahame Mulunga
  - Councilor: Swila Dede Swila

Population (2016)
  - Total: 9,104
- Time zone: UTC+3 (EAT)

Shibula is an ward in Ilemela District, Mwanza Region, Tanzania. In 2016 the Tanzania National Bureau of Statistics report there were 9,104 people in the ward.
