= Ibungilo =

Ward in Ilemela, Mwanza, Tanzania

Ibungilo Kata ya Ibungilo
- Ward
- Location within Tanzania Location within Africa
- Coordinates: 2.489638°S 32.90568°E
- Country: Tanzania
- Region: Mwanza Region
- District: Ilemela District
- Ward: Ibungilo

Government
  - District Executive Director: John P. Wanga
  - MP: Angeline Mabula
  - Mayor: Renatus Bahame Mulunga
  - Councilor: Yusuph Mugerwa Musoke

Population (2016)
  - Total: 30,950
- Time zone: UTC+3 (EAT)
- Postcode: 33223

Ibungilo is an administrative ward and the headquarter of the Ilemela District in Mwanza Region Tanzania. In 2016 the Tanzania National Bureau of Statistics report there were 30,950 people in the ward.

== Villages ==
The ward has seven villages.

- Ibungilo A
- Ibungilo B
- Nyamanoro Kaskazini
- Nyamanoro C
- Kiloleli A
- Kiloleli B
- Nyamanoro B
