= Mecco =

Ward in Mwanza, Tanzania

Mecco Kata ya Mecco
- Ward
- Location within Tanzania
- Coordinates: 2.51651624°S 32.9176345°E
- Country: Tanzania
- Region: Mwanza Region
- District: Ilemela District
- Ward: Mecco

Government
  - District Executive Director: John P. Wanga
  - MP: Angelina Mabula
  - Mayor: Renatus Bahame Mulunga
  - Councilor: Godlisten medison Kisanga

Population (2016)
  - Total: 15,746
- Time zone: UTC+3 (EAT)
- Postcode: 33212

Mecco is an administrative ward in Ilemela District, Mwanza Region, Tanzania. In 2016 the Tanzania National Bureau of Statistics report there were 15,746 people in the ward.

== Villages ==
The ward has 5 villages.

- Mecco Mashariki
- Mecco Kaskazini
- Mecco Kusini
- Nundu
- Gedeli Kivukoni
