= Kahama (Ilemela) =

Ward of Ilemela District, Tanzania

Kahama Kata ya Kahama
- Ward
- Location within Tanzania
- Coordinates: 2°29′37″S 32°59′20″E
- Country: Tanzania
- Region: Mwanza
- District: Ilemela
- Elevation: 1,249 m (4,098 ft)

Population (2016)
  - Total: 8,197
- Time zone: UTC+3 (EAT)
- Post code: 33215

Kahama is an administrative ward in Ilemela District, Mwanza Region, Tanzania. In the year 2016, the Tanzania National Bureau of Statistics reported that there were 8,197 people in the ward. Its post code is 33215.

== Geography ==
Kahama is situated on the southern portion of Ilemela District. It is surrounded by mountains in three directions, and has an average elevation of 1,259 metres above sea level.

== Villages ==
There are 9 villages under the ward:

- Buduku
- Butega
- Buyombe
- Isela
- Kadina
- Kahama
- Lukobe
- Magaka
- Wiluhnya
