= Highness Kiwia =

Tanzanian politician (born 1976)

Honourable Highness Kiwia MP

Member of Parliament for Ilemela
- In office November 2010 – 2015
- Preceded by: Anthony Diallo
- Succeeded by: Angeline Mabula

Personal details
- Born: 8 October 1976 (age 49)
- Party: CHADEMA

Highness Samson Kiwia (born October 8, 1976) was a Tanzanian CHADEMA politician and Member of Parliament for Ilemela constituency between 2010 and 2015.
