= Kiseke =

Ward in Ilemela, Mwanza, Tanzania

Kiseke Kata ya Kiseke
- Ward
- Location within Tanzania
- Coordinates: 2.4745444°S 32.9352522°E
- Country: Tanzania
- Region: Mwanza Region
- District: Ilemela District
- Ward: Kiseke

Government
  - Type: District Council
  - District Executive Director: Ummy Wayayu
  - MP: Kafiti William Kafiti
  - Mayor: Sarah Paul Ng'hwani
  - Councilor: Dr. Godwin Marcel Gunewe

Population (2022)
  - Total: 30,664
- Time zone: UTC+3 (EAT)

Kiseke is an administrative ward in Ilemela District, Mwanza Region, Tanzania with a postcode number 33216.

In 2016 the Tanzania National Bureau of Statistics report there were 15,274 people in the ward.
