= Kawekamo =

Ward in Ilemela, Mwanza, Tanzania

Kawekamo Kata ya Kawekamo
- Ward
- Location within Tanzania
- Coordinates: 2.466986°S 32.928417°E
- Country: Tanzania
- Region: Mwanza Region
- District: Ilemela District
- Ward: Kawekamo

Population (2016)
  - Total: 22,526
- Time zone: UTC+3 (EAT)
- Postcode: 33219

Kawekamo, also known as Kamwekamo, is an Administrative Ward and the headquarter of the Ilemela District in Mwanza Region Tanzania. In 2016 the Tanzania National Bureau of Statistics report there were 22,526 people in the ward.

== Villages ==
The ward has 7 villages.

- Nyasaka A
- Nyasaka B
- Nyasaka C
- Msumbiji
- Kawekamo B
- Pasiansi Mashariki A
- Pasiansi Mashariki B
