= Saanane Island National Park =

National Park of Tanzania

- IUCN category II (national park)
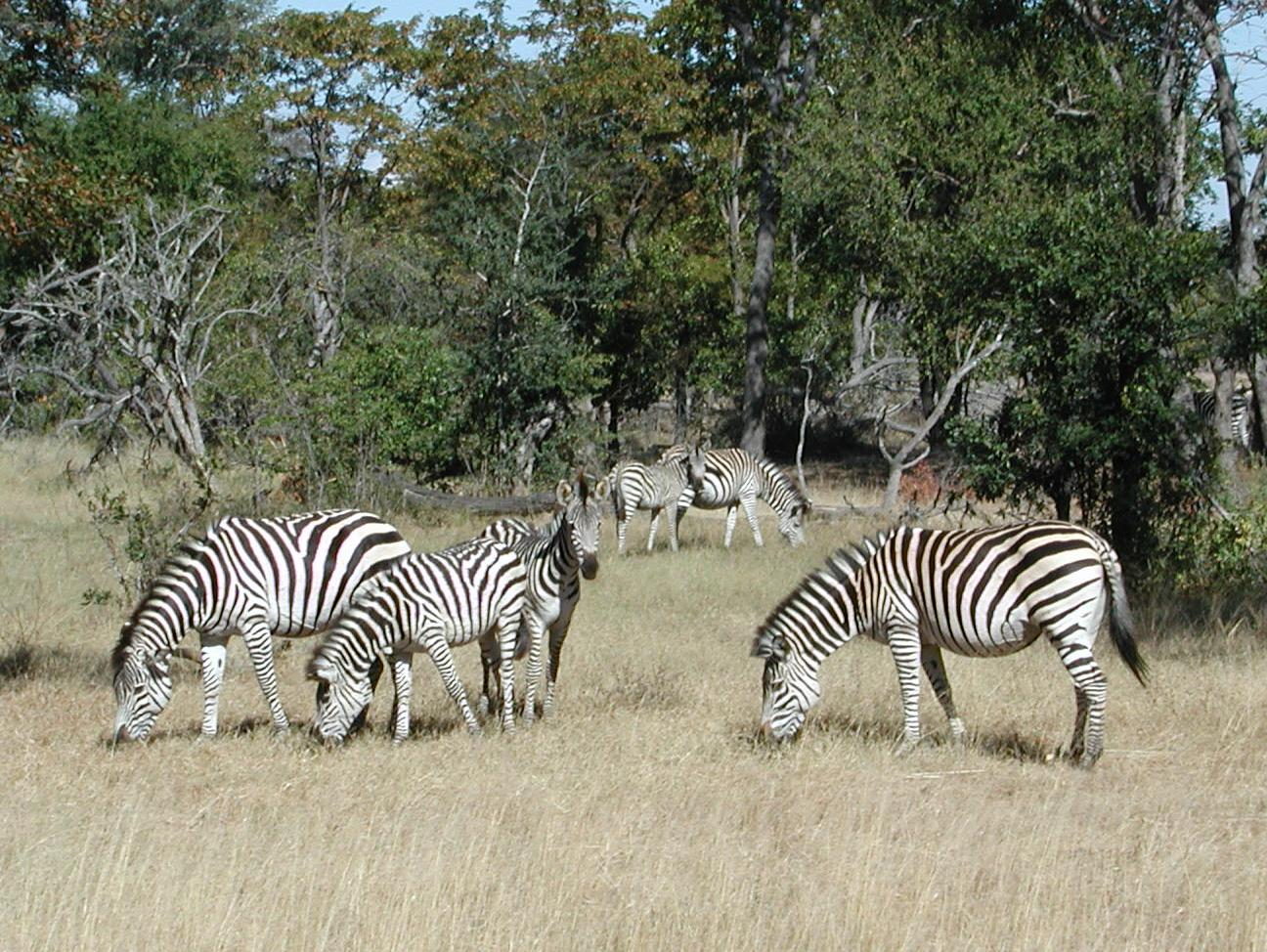
- Zebras at Saanane Island National Park

- Location within Tanzania
- Location: Tanzania, Mwanza Region, Ilemela District
- Nearest city: Mwanza City
- Coordinates: 02°32′38″S 32°53′24″E
- Area: 2.8 km^{2} (1.1 sq mi)
- Established: 2013
- Visitors: 5,278 (in 2012)
- Governing body: Tanzanian National Parks Authority
- Website: Park website

Saanane Island National Park (Hifadhi ya Taifa ya Kisiwa cha Saanane, in Swahili) is a national park of Tanzania and freshwater island, with the IUCN category II located within Ilemela District of the Mwanza Region of Tanzania. It is named after the local farmer and fisherman Mzee Saanane Chavandi.

== History ==
The park, at the time known as "Saa Nane Island Game Sanctuary", was accidentally bombed during the air campaign of the Uganda–Tanzania War of 1978–1979. On 29 March 1979, Libyan leader Muammar Gaddafi ordered one of his Tupolev Tu-22 bombers to attack Mwanza, hoping to thereby intimidate the Tanzanian government into calling off its invasion of Uganda. The Tu-22 completely missed the city, however, and its five anti-personnel rockets instead hit the game sanctuary, slightly injuring one worker and killing several animals. According to journalists Tony Avirgan and Martha Honey, six antelopes as well as many birds were killed. In contrast, intelligence analyst Kenneth M. Pollack stated that "a large number of antelope" was killed.

== Fauna ==
The island is home to various species of mammals, including the vervet monkey, wild cat, zebra and rock hyrax, amongst others. It is the only place in Tanzania where De-brazza's monkeys are found. Over 40 species of bird have also been recorded here.

== See also ==
- Rubondo Island National Park
- List of islands of Tanzania
