= Pasiansi =

Ward in Mwanza, Tanzania

Pasiansi Kata ya Pasiansi
- Ward
- Location within Tanzania
- Coordinates: 2.4798685°S 32.91105791°E
- Country: Tanzania
- Region: Mwanza Region
- District: Ilemela District
- Ward: Pasiansi

Population (2016)
  - Total: 17,713
- Time zone: UTC+3 (EAT)

Pasiansi is an Ward in Ilemela District, Mwanza Region, Tanzania with a postcode 33206. In 2016 the Tanzania National Bureau of Statistics report there were 17,713 people in the ward, from 35,723 in 2012.
