= Kayenze =

Ward in Ilemela, Mwanza, Tanzania

Kayenze Kata ya Kayenze
- Ward
- Location within Tanzania
- Coordinates: 2.3926961°S 33.078523°E
- Country: Tanzania
- Region: Mwanza Region
- District: Ilemela District
- Ward: Kayenze

Population (2016)
  - Total: 10,035
- Time zone: UTC+3 (EAT)
- Postcode: 33207

Kayenze is an administrative ward in Ilemela District, Mwanza Region, Tanzania. In 2016 the Tanzania National Bureau of Statistics report there were 10,035 people in the ward.

== Villages ==
The ward has 15 villages.

- Igombe A
- Bugogwa
- Lugezi
- Kabangaja
- Kasamwa
- Igombe B
- Kigote
- Kilabela
- Bujimwa
- Kayenze Ndogo
- Kisundi
- Isanzu
- Igogwe
- Nkoroto
- Kilimanilwe Mtemi
