= Ngudu =

Ward in Kwimba, Mwanza, Tanzania

Ngudu Kata ya Ngudu
- Ward
- Location within Tanzania Location within Africa
- Coordinates: 02°58′S 33°20′E
- Country: Tanzania
- Region: Mwanza Region
- District: Kwimba District
- Ward: Ngudu

Population (2016)
  - Total: 31,123
- Time zone: UTC+3 (EAT)
- Postcode: 33801

Ngudu is a town in the Kwimba District of the Mwanza Region in northwestern Tanzania. The town is the location of the district headquarters of Kwimba District. In 2016 the Tanzania National Bureau of Statistics report there were 31,123 people in the ward, from 27,630 in 2012.

The Magogo river system lies in the Ngudu area, covering an area of 1,212 km^{2} (468 sq mi) and draining into Lake Victoria at the Mwanza Gulf.

== Villages ==
The ward has 14 villages.

- Kimwaga Busabi
- Chamhela
- Ngudu mjini
- Kakora
- Igoma
- Sokoni
- Ngudulugulu
- Budula
- Bugakama
- Ngumo
- Shuleni
- Ilamba
- Kilyaboya
- Welamasonga
