= Katunguru =

Katunguru may refer to

- Katunguru, Tanzania, an administrative ward in Serengema District, Mwanza Region, Tanzania
- Katunguru, Uganda, a town in Rubirizi District, Western Region, Uganda.
