= Chifunfu =

Ward of Sengerema District, Tanzania

Chifunfu Kata ya Chifunfu
- Ward
- Location within Tanzania
- Coordinates: 02°24′12″S 32°39′14″E
- Country: Tanzania
- Region: Mwanza
- District: Sengerema
- Elevation: 1,140 m (3,740 ft)

Population (2016)
  - Total: 26,337
- Time zone: UTC+3 (EAT)
- Post code: 33325

Chifunfu is a ward of Sengerema District, Mwanza Region, Tanzania. According to the census held in 2016, the ward has 26,337 residents living within its borders. Its postal code is 33325.

== Geography ==
Chifunfu is the northernmost ward of Sengerema District. It is located on a peninsula surrounded by the Lake Victoria to three directions. Its average elevation is at 1,140 metres above the sea level.

== Villages ==
The ward consists of the following 9 villages:

- Lyakanyasi
- Kaku
- Kanyatenga
- Kijiweni
- Luchanga
- Magamelo
- Mlumo
- Ngoma Mtimba
- Mnazi Mmoja
