= Misungwi =

Ward in Misungwi, Mwanza, Tanzania

Misungwi Kata ya Misungwi
- Ward
- Location within Tanzania Location within Africa
- Coordinates: 2°51′S 33°5′E
- Country: Tanzania
- Region: Mwanza
- District: Misungwi District
- Ward: Misungwi

Population (2016)
  - Total: 34,612
- Time zone: UTC+3 (EAT)
- Postcode: 33512

Misungwi or Missungwi or Isungwi is a ward in Misungwi District, Mwanza Region, Tanzania. It is the biggest town on the trunk road from Mwanza to Shinyanga. In 2016 the Tanzania National Bureau of Statistics report there were 34,612 people in the ward, from 30,728 in 2012.

== Villages ==
The ward has 39 villages.

- Misungwi "C"
- Misungwi "D"
- Kanisani
- Bariadi
- Majengo
- Masawe "A"
- Masawe "B"
- Masawe "C"
- Bukwaya
- Muungano.
- Mbela "A"
- Mbela "B"
- Mbela "C"
- Mbela "D"
- Misri
- Sekondari
- Misungwi "A".
- Misungwi "B"
- Mitindo "A"
- Mitindo “B”
- Polisi
- Iteja.
- Lumbaga.
- Kabila
- Bugunga.
- Mitindo "A"
- Mitindo “B”
- Mwamanga.
- Bugando.
- Machimbo.
- Misheni.
- Bukwaya.
- Mwambola.
- Mitindo.
- Mwamanyili.
- Itale.
- Mwankali.
- Ng'wambola 'B'
- Ng'wanghalanga
