= Kwimba District =

Kwimba District Wilaya ya Kwimba (Swahili)
- District
- Kwimba District of Mwanza Region
- Coordinates: 02°58′S 033°20′E
- Country: Tanzania
- Region: Mwanza Region

Area
  - Total: 3,254 km^{2} (1,256 sq mi)

Population (2022)
  - Total: 480,025
  - Density: 147.5/km^{2} (382.1/sq mi)

Kwimba District is one of the seven districts of the Mwanza Region of Tanzania. It is bordered to the north by the Magu District, to the east by Maswa District and Kishapu District, to the south by Shinyanga Rural District, and to the west by Misungwi District. The district seat is at Ngudu. Sumve is another important settlement in Kwimba District, hosting a hospital and large church.

The majority of the residents of Kwimba are Wasukuma from the Sukuma tribe who speak Sukuma as their first language along with Swahili as their second language. Most of the residents are engaged in the subsistence farming of rice, sweet potatoes, cassava, millet or maize.

As of 2012, the population of the Kwimba District was 406,509. By 2022, the population had increased to 480,025.

== Livestock ==
The 2002 Tanzania National Census showed the following statistics for livestock population in the Kwimba district:

- Cattle - 366,210
- Goats - 102,048
- Sheep - 77,333
- Donkeys - 4,416

== Transport ==
Land transport is the major means of transport in Kwimba district, with many using cars, buses, bicycles and motorcycles to move from one area to another

Paved trunk road T8 from Shinyanga to Mwanza passes through Kwimba district from south to north.

The Central Line railway from Tabora to Mwanza passes through the district from east to west and there are three railway stations within the district's boundaries at the villages of Malya, Bukwimba and Mantare.

== Administrative subdivisions ==
As of 2012, Kwimba District was divided into five divisions and 30 wards.

=== Divisions ===
- Ibindo
- Ngudu
- Ngulla
- Nyamilama
- Mwamashimba

=== Wards ===
- Bugando
- Bungulwa
- Bupamwa
- Fukalo
- Hungumalwa
- Igongwa
- Ilula Ward
- Iseni
- Kikubiji
- Lyoma
- Maligisu
- Malya Ward
- Mantare Ward
- Mhande
- Mwabomba
- Mwagi
- Mwakilambiti
- Mwamala
- Mwandu
- Mwang'halanga
- Mwankulwe
- Ng'hundi
- Ngudu
- Ngulla
- Nkalalo
- Nyambiti
- Nyamilama
- Shilembo
- Sumve
- Walla
