= Sumcot =

the Sumcot building

Sumcot, or the Sumve Community Computer Training Center, is a computer training center in the town of Sumve, near Mwanza in Tanzania. It was set up with the help of Wilde Ganzen, a Dutch NGO, and the Sumve Foundation, an organization with the aim of supporting the Sumve Designated District Hospital (DDH).

Sumcot is used to train the following groups of people in basic computer skills:

- Sumve DDH staff
- students of Girls Secondary School
- students of Sumve High School (boys and girls)
- students of NMTC (Nursing and Midwifery Training Centre)
- other residents of Sumve, who want to acquire/improve computer skills

The center currently has 16 student computers, plus one teacher desktop and a teacher laptop computer. It has a projector, used to give presentations as part of the lessons. There is also a Local Area Network and a central file server. Recently, TTCL erected a tower at Sumcot which will soon be delivering fast internet services.
