= Joel Mwaka =

Tanzanian politician

Honourable Joel Mwaka MP

MP for Chilonwa
- In office 2015–2020

Personal details
- Born: Tanzania
- Party: Chama Cha Mapinduzi

Joel Mwaka (born March 16, 1960) is a Tanzanian politician and a member of the Chama Cha Mapinduzi political party. He was elected MP representing Chilonwa in 2015.
