= Witness-Patchelly Kambale Musonia =

Witness-Patchely Musonia
- Born: 1982
- Died: 21 June 2011 (aged 28–29); Kirumba, Eastern Democratic Republic of the Congo
- Occupation: Radio Journalist
- Children: 1 child

Witness-Patchelly Kambale Musonia, also known as Kambale Musoni, (1982-June 21, 2011) of the Democratic Republic of the Congo was a journalist and host of a daily talk show program on a community station called Radio Communautaire De Lubero Sud in Kirumba, North Kivu, which is northwest of Rutshuru. He was killed after reporting about a recent arrest of a dozen people accused of trafficking military weapons for criminal activity.

He was the sixth journalist to be murdered in eastern Democratic Republic of the Congo since 2007.

== Death ==
Kirumba is in North Kivu, which is shown within the Democratic Republic of the Congo relative to the capital Kinshasa.

Musonia was shot at close range three times in the chest by three unidentified gunmen on Tuesday, 21 June 2011 as he walked home from his office at Congo Chine Télécoms in eastern Democratic Republic of the Congo where he worked as a communications officer. Radio station director John Maliro told the Committee to Protect Journalists that witnesses heard gunshots around 7:30 p.m. and claimed that the gunmen seemed to have been waiting for Musonia. His death came amid a series of attacks on the press in the run towards presidential elections in November 2011.

== Context ==
Jean Maliro, the radio station director, told CPJ, “The motive of the murder was not immediately clear and Musonia had not reported any threats.” The exact reasons behind his murder are still unclear, but many believe it had a direct connection with Musonia's work four days prior to his death.

On 17 June 2011 on a radio program, called Kirumba Toka Tshini (Kirumba Stand Up), Musonia discussed the recent arrest of a dozen people accused of arms trafficking for criminal activity with a local civil-society member. During this phone-in program callers blamed the violent crime in Kirumba on bandits operating with the complicity of the local police.

Musonia had also recently reported on the insecure climate in the Nord-Kivu province of the Democratic Republic of Congo that had been fueled by gangs of armed bandits for the past several years. Reporters Without Borders explains that violence against the media has been constant in the Democratic Republic of the Congo for years.

== Impact ==
According to the CPJ, authorities in the eastern Congo have exhibited an alarming pattern of failing to investigate and prosecute the murders of journalists. Musonia was the sixth journalist to be murdered in eastern Democratic Republic of Congo since 2007. Sadly, most of these murders have gone unpunished.

The African Human Rights Defenders Network is working to put an end to the violence against journalists. AHRDN recommended the following in regards to the government of the Democratic Republic of the Congo:

- To carry out a criminal investigation and identify and arrest those responsible for the death of Witness-Patchelly Kambale Musonia;
- To guarantee the safety of journalist while at work;
- To guarantee the right to information to all citizens;
- To take actions necessary in order to stop the killing campaign against journalists in the Democratic Republic of the Congo

The Réseau des Défenseurs des Droits Humains en Afrique Centrale announced that they will spare no effort in helping capture, and ensuring that all perpetrators of these heinous crimes are punished.

With only months to go until the presidential election, that will inevitably increase tensions, the authorities have more grounds than usual for immediate deployment of whatever resources are needed to insure the safety of media personnel and defuse tensions in the Democratic Republic of the Congo.

== Reactions ==
The international community is being urged to take necessary actions in order to draw the attention of the DRC government. Organizations such as the CPJ, AHRDN and Reporters Without Borders are urging the Democratic Republic of the Congo government to respect its commitments to their country by protecting human rights, especially the freedom of media. Both Journalists en Danger (JED) and Reporters Without Borders are calling for concrete measures to protect journalists and combat impunity in the Democratic Republic of the Congo.

In response to the murder, the Network of Human Rights Defenders in Central Africa informed the government of the Democratic Republic of the Congo in particular, but also all the governments of Central Africa, of the seriousness of abuse against human rights, and condemned the violations and killings of journalists in the Democratic Republic of the Congo in particular, and human rights defenders in general. NHRDCA fears that the assassination of Witness Patchelly Kambale-Musonia is only the beginning of a new series that aims to silence the press on the eve of the country's election process.

Irina Bokova, who is the director-general of UNESCO, said, “I condemn the murder of Witness-Patchelly Kambale Musonia. Such crimes affect society’s ability to enjoy the basic human right of freedom of expression. The death of a journalist in violent circumstances is an attempt to silence the all-important voice of the press. I call on the Congolese authorities to investigate this killing and to bring those responsible to justice.”

“We offer our condolences to Musonia’s family and friends,” Reporters Without Borders said. “This murder has unfortunately served as a reminder that the Kivu region and the rest of the eastern part of the Democratic Republic of the Congo are one of the most dangerous regions in Africa for journalists.”

In the months leading to the presidential election, those who called Musonia a colleague now acknowledge that it is their responsibility to help the Congolese people exercise their rights and make informed decisions about the direction in which to take their country.

== Career ==
Witness-Patchelly Kambale Musonia began working as a local communications officer and host for Radio Communautaire de Lubero Sud in the Congo's North Kivu province in 2008. He worked in an office at Congo Chine Télécoms in Kirumba.

As part of his job, Musonia hosted a live broadcast radio program called “Wake Up Kirumba”. On the program he would often discuss political issues with civil society leaders and take calls and questions from local listeners.

== Personal life ==
Musonia, 29, is survived by a wife and 7-month-old child. Details of his burial are unclear.
