= Katunguru, Tanzania =

Ward in Sengerema District, Mwanza Region

Katunguru Kata ya Katunguru
- Ward
- Location within Tanzania Location within Africa
- Coordinates: 2.507°S 32.675°E
- Country: Tanzania
- Region: Mwanza Region
- District: Sengerema District
- Ward: Katunguru

Population (2016)
  - Total: 22,848
- Time zone: UTC+3 (EAT)
- Postcode: 33332

Katunguru, also Katungulu is an administrative ward in Sengerema District, Mwanza Region, Tanzania. In 2016 the Tanzania National Bureau of Statistics report there were 22,848 people in the ward, from 20,284 in 2012.

== Villages ==
The ward has 24 villages.

- Magharibi
- Uswahilini
- Mashariki
- Mwambao
- Bubinza
- Igalagalilo Mashariki
- Igalagalilo Magharibu
- Nyankolongo
- Nyamtelela Kati
- Kabingo
- Isamilo
- Ikolo
- Isakulilo
- Mabatini
- Nkungule "A"
- Nkungule "B"
- Bugando
- Mtakuja
- Nyashimba
- Madukani
- Mwambao
- Sokoni
- Nyamlege
- Mlimani
