= Sumve =

Ward in Kwimba, Mwanza, Tanzania

Sumve Kata ya Sumve
- Ward
- Sumve's Sunday Market

- Location within Tanzania Location within Africa
- Coordinates: 2°45′S 33°14′E
- Country: Tanzania
- Region: Mwanza Region
- District: Kwimba District
- Ward: Sumve

Area
  - Total: 92 km^{2} (36 sq mi)

Population (2016)
  - Total: 18,514
  - Density: 179/km^{2} (460/sq mi)
- Time zone: UTC+3 (EAT)
- Postcode: 33814

Sumve is a ward located in the Kwimba District of the Mwanza Region, in Tanzania. Sumve's residents are predominantly from the Wasukuma tribe, the largest in Tanzania, but some of Sumve's institutions employ Wahaya, Wajita, Wakerewe, Wanyamwezi and others from neighboring tribes. Therefore, many of the residents speak Kisukuma along with Swahili, the national language. In 2016 the Tanzania National Bureau of Statistics reported there were 18,514 people in the ward, from 16,436 in 2012.

The primary economic activity in the village of Sumve is the farming of rice, maize and cotton, often at the subsistence level. Sumve hosts the Kwimba district designated hospital. Since six years the village has been connected to electricity via Tanesco, although there are frequent power outages (in which case a generator kicks in). The Sumve College of Nursing and Midwifery collaborates in training the hospital staff. Two secondary schools, Sumve Girls Secondary School (O-level) and Sumve High School (O and A-level) are located in the village along with several primary schools. Many of the residents are Roman Catholic, and a large Catholic church built by the "White Fathers" of the Netherlands nearly 100 years ago still remains in Sumve today.

Sumve is approximately 70 km Southeast of Mwanza, the regional capital. Though very rural, plans exist to bring running water to Sumve's residents in the near future. At present there is a small water pump to supply water throughout the village. A computer training center, called Sumcot, has been set up, to assure IT education and internet use is available to hospital staff and students of the schools. Sumve is accessible via private vehicles (travel time is about one hour to Mwanza), but most visitors and residents take one of the buses to and from Mwanza. Though the place is accessible through railway road but at the present is not in function. The area is supplied with full mobile network dominated by Airtel and Vodacom.

== Villages ==
The ward has 27 villages.

- Sumve Lugulu "A"
- Sumve Lugulu "B"
- Budushi "A"
- Budushi "B"
- Budushi "C"
- Nyamayengo
- Chambali
- Nyamijundu
- Solwe
- Sumve
- Mahiga
- Imalaseko
- Mbafe
- Mabatini
- Igoma
- Nyambiti
- Lugeye
- Businuka
- Buchela
- Bumyengeja
- Ilebelo
- Kasela
- Mwashilalage
- Ngongwa
- Nyang'hwale
- Mwakasubi
- Kitangili
