= William Ngeleja =

Tanzanian politician

Honourable William Ngeleja MP
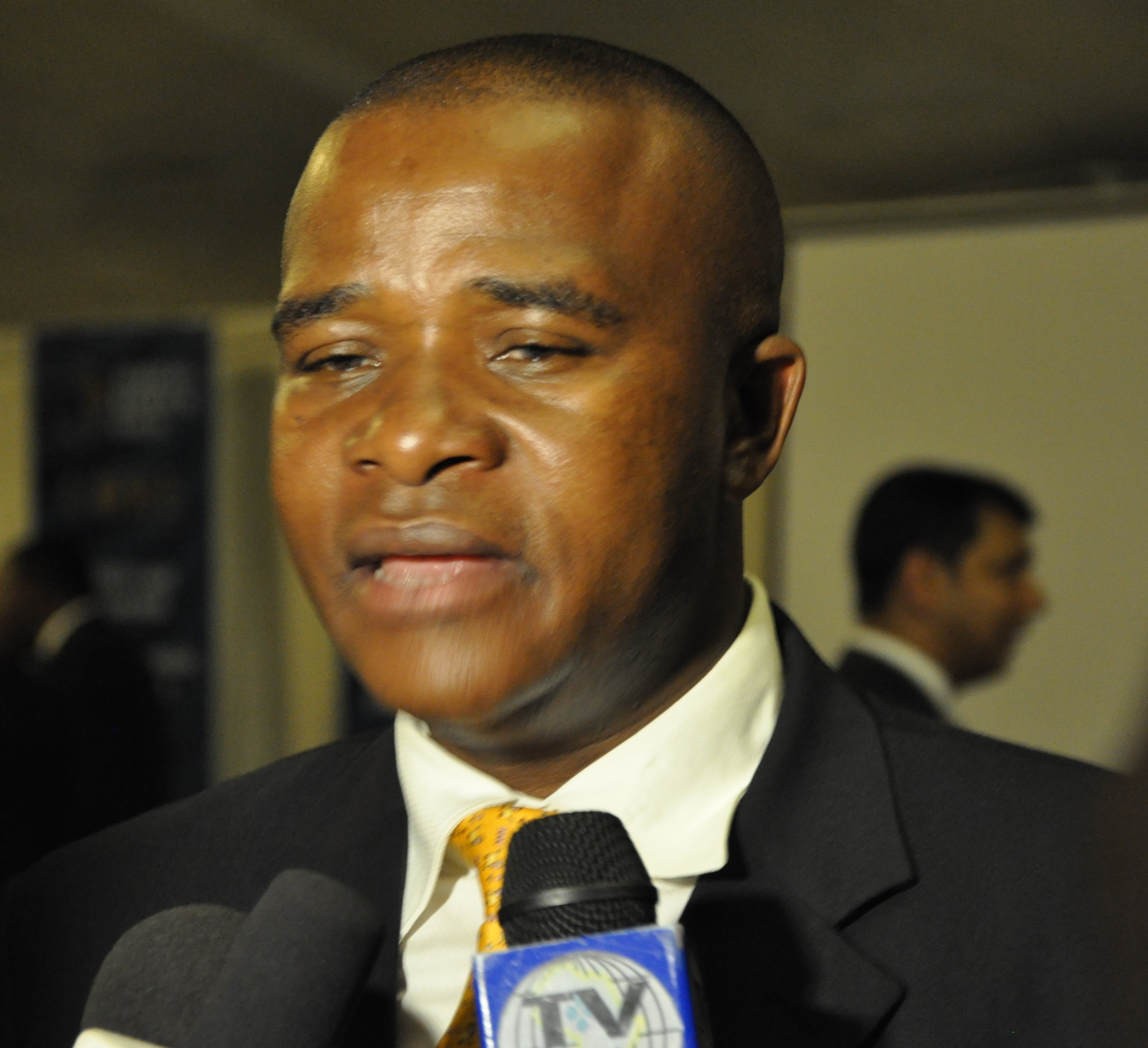

Member of Parliament for Sengerema
- Incumbent
- Assumed office December 2005
- Preceded by: William Shija

Personal details
- Born: 5 October 1967 (age 58)
- Party: CCM
- Education: University of Dar es Salaam
- Position(s): Co. Advocate, PwC TZ; Co. Advocate, Vodacom TZ

William Mganga Ngeleja (born 5 October 1967) is a Tanzanian CCM politician and Member of Parliament for Sengerema constituency since 2005.
