= Sengerema =

- City
- Location in Tanzania
- Coordinates: 2.65026°S 32.64342°E,
- Country: Tanzania
- Region: Mwanza Region
- District: Sengerema District

Government
  - Type: Town Council

Population (2022 census)
  - Total: 110,000
- Time zone: GMT + 3

Sengerema is a city in the Mwanza Region of Tanzania, East Africa. It serves as the administrative seat of Sengerema District, one of the districts of Mwanza Region.

Sengerema District Hospital, founded in 1959, is located within Sengerema city.

The paved trunk road T4 from Mwanza to Geita runs through Sengerema.
