= Abdallah Bulembo =

Tanzanian politician

Honourable Abdallah Majurah Bulembo MP

MP for Dodoma
- In office 2015–2020

Personal details
- Born: 15TH MARCH 1961_TANZANIA
- Party: Chama Cha Mapinduzi

Abdallah Majurah Bulembo is a Tanzanian politician and a member of the Chama Cha Mapinduzi political party. He was elected MP representing Dodoma in 2015.
