= Richard Mbogo =

Tanzanian politician

Member of Parliament for Nsimbo
- In office 2015–2020

Personal details
- Born: August 2, 1973 (age 52) Tanzania
- Party: Chama Cha Mapinduzi

Richard Mbogo (born August 2, 1973) is a Tanzanian politician and a member of the Chama Cha Mapinduzi political party. He was elected MP representing Nsimbo in 2015.
