= Julius Kalanga =

Tanzanian politician

Honourable Julius Kalanga MP

MP for Monduli
- In office 2015–2020

Personal details
- Born: April 12, 1978 (age 48) Tanzania
- Party: Chama Cha Mapinduzi

Julius Kalanga (born April 12, 1978) is a Tanzanian politician and a member of the Chama Cha Mapinduzi political party. He was elected MP representing Monduli in 2015.
