= Kaika Telele =

Tanzanian politician

The Honourable Kaika Telele

Deputy Minister of Livestock and Fisheries Development
- In office 30 January 2014 – 2015
- Minister: Titus Kamani
- Preceded by: Benedict Ole-Nangoro
- Succeeded by: Abdallah Ulega

Member of Parliament for Ngorongoro
- In office December 2005 – 2015
- Preceded by: Matthew Olle Timan
- Succeeded by: Tate Ole Hasha

Personal details
- Born: 15 January 1954 (age 72) Tanganyika
- Party: CCM
- Education: University of Magdeburg (Cert); Centre for Foreign Relations

Kaika Saning'o Telele (born 15 January 1954) is a Tanzanian CCM politician and Member of Parliament for Ngorongoro constituency since 2005.
