= Wilfred Lwakatare =

Tanzanian politician

Wilfred Muganyizi Lwakatare

MP for Bukoba
- In office 2015–2020

Personal details
- Born: January 4, 1964 (age 62) Tanzania
- Party: Chadema

Wilfred Lwakatare (born January 4, 1964) is a Tanzanian politician and a member of the Chadema political party. He was elected MP representing Bukoba Urban in 2015.
