= Baby Madaha =

Tanzanian actress and musician (born 1988)

- Born: Baby Joseph Madaha; 19 November 1988 (age 37); Mwanza, Tanzania
- Occupations: Actress; Musician
- Years active: 2000–present
- Website: instagram.com/babymadaha666

Baby Madaha (born 19 November 1988 in Tanzania, Mwanza) is a Tanzanian actress and musician.

== Career ==
Madaha was the winner of the Bongo Star Search competition in 2007. She is known for her hit single "Amore".

She also won a German award for her role in the movie Nani. She has acted in films including Blessed by god, Tifu la mwaka, Misukosuko and Ray of hope.

In 2013, Madaha was signed by the Kenyan music label Candy n Candy.

== Discography ==
Single(s)	Producer/director	Album	Ref(s)
"Dil Se Mile" Feat, Sajni Srivastava	Sameer Srivastava		
"Ämore"	Pancho Latino	Amore	
"Summer Holiday"	Candy N Candy Records		
"Nimezama"	Manecky		
"Squeeze Me Tight"	Candy n Candy		
"Mr Deejay"	Adu-Komik		
"Mjanja Wangu"	Allain Mapigo		
