= Rwegasira Oscar =

Tanzanian politician

Rwegasira Mukasa Oscar

Member of Parliament
- In office 2015–2020
- Constituency: Biharamulo Magharibi

Personal details
- Born: July 28, 1970 (age 56) Kagera Region, Tanzania
- Party: CCM
- Education: Nerthelands Institute of Health Sciences; University of Dar es Salaam

Rwegasira Oscar (born July 28, 1970) is a Tanzanian politician and a member of the CCM political party. He was elected MP representing Kagera in 2015. He is the chairman of the HIV Parliamentary Committee.
