= Mhande =

Traditional Shona music and dance performance

Mhande is a traditional performance practiced among the Shona people, involving music and dance. It is a vital element of the mutoro ceremony, an annual rain ritual of the Karanga.

== Music and dance in Mhande ==
The music and dance of mhande are intricately intertwined. Similar to other forms of traditional Shona music, like mbira, the mhande music features a triple meter, a cyclical structure, and polyrhythms. These interwoven rhythms emerge from the drummers, dancers' footwork, singers, and the makwa hand-clapping by participants or observers. The unique rhythmic pattern of "1, 2 … 1, 2, 3, 4 … 1, 2, 3" sets mhande apart from other ceremonial Shona musical and dance styles, such as the Mbende Jerusarema dance.

Most mhande performances involve two drummers, using Shauro and Tsinhiro drums, accompanied by hand clapping (makwa) from nearby participants and rattles attached to the dancers' legs to accentuate the rhythms of their footwork. In some contexts, multiple marimbas may also be part of the ensemble. One drummer plays the "call" rhythm on the Shauro drum, while the other responds with the "response" rhythm on the Tsinhiro drum.

Within traditional Shona indigenous belief systems, music in ceremonial settings is thought to create an environment that facilitates trance (vanonyaunyawa), allowing individuals to be possessed by ancestral spirits, known as dzavadzimu. This possession enables communication through these spirits to gain insights from the divine. The presence of both music and dance in mhande is believed to invoke these spirits. However, mhande is also performed in competitive, celebratory, and non-ceremonial contexts.

A diverse collection of songs is performed during mhande, each intended to invoke distinct spirits, and each carrying its own origin story. Examples include "Uya Uone" and "Pfumojena". "Pfumojena" was sung during the struggle against British colonial rule, seeking assistance and strength from the spirits for the battle. "Madzura Uswa" is another song expressing gratitude to the spirits for sending abundant rains while cautioning farmers to prepare for such heavy rainfall by constructing storm drains.

== Cultural significance ==
Mhande embodies Karanga epistemology, being a crucial component of mutoro, the annual rain rituals, and kurova guva ceremonies. It involves singing, dancing, drumming, and hand clapping. The rhythms, songs, and dances serve as a medium for communicating with majukwa rain spirits, who convey their desires to the Creator, Musiki or Mwari, requesting rain. These ceremonies often take place at the Matonjeni sanctuary in the Matopo Hills, a sacred site for Karanga spiritual practices. Additionally, Mhande serves as a way for ancestors to connect with their descendants.

The significance of the annual mutoro rituals in Zimbabwe, particularly within the Karanga community, stems from the region's heavy reliance on agriculture. The country experiences distinct wet and dry seasons, and the success of the year's crops hinges on the amount of rainfall during the rainy season. The mutoro rituals serve as a collective prayer for adequate rainfall.

Mhande is an embodiment of Karanga culture and is performed as a reflection of their values. This "embodied practice" is a tradition passed down through generations and conveys their unique way of life. The participation is limited to adults, and knowledge is often transferred from parents to children.

It's essential to approach Mhande as a practical illustration of their social context and the collective experiences of the community. The historical legacy, especially in the context of slavery, endows all music and dance with a sense of liberation, portraying reality in a conceptual manner.

== Mhande dance ==
As previously mentioned, the Mhande dance and song are closely intertwined, creating a cohesive experience. Mhande is defined as an indigenous song-dance performed as part of the mutoro ceremony, the annual rain ritual of the Karanga. The Mhande dance goes beyond a typical dance performed to a song; it carries historical significance and a deeper meaning. This dance is specifically associated with the midlands tribes and is a crucial facet of their cultural heritage. It serves as an artistic expression of the values and beliefs of the rural Karanga community in the Shurugwi District of Zimbabwe. Mhande provides a platform for Zimbabweans and other participants to convey their values through indigenous contexts: the Kurova guva and the Mutoro, representing the settlement of ancestral spirits and rain-making rituals, respectively.

Mhande dance is a spiritual manifestation of Karanga culture, embodying an "embodied practice." Its purpose is to convey cultural knowledge that might be less accessible through conventional means. Combining singing, instrument playing, and dance movements, Mhande informally imparts indigenous spiritual wisdom (chikaranga). The dance physically embodies the indigenous cultural knowledge, especially through stylized and coded movements that constitute dance. Through these movements, historical events, existential experiences, social values, and symbolism are acknowledged and communicated.
