= Alex Gashaza =

Tanzanian politician

Honourable Alex Raphael Gashaza MP

MP for Ngara
- In office 2015–2020

Personal details
- Born: August 20, 1967 (age 58)
- Party: Chama Cha Mapinduzi

Alex Gashaza (born August 20, 1967) is a Tanzanian politician and a member of the Chama Cha Mapinduzi political party. He was elected MP representing Ngara in 2015.
