= Kasuku Bilago =

Tanzanian politician

Kasuku Bilago was a Tanzanian politician and a member of the Chadema political party. He was elected MP representing Buyungu in 2015. Bilago died on 28 May 2018 after a brief illness.
