= Misungwi District =

- District
- Misungwi District of Mwanza Region Administration < District commissioner JOSEPH SAGI SABAYO
- Coordinates: 02°51′S 033°05′E
- Country: Tanzania
- Region: Mwanza Region

Area
  - Total: 2,579 km^{2} (996 sq mi)

Population (2022)
  - Total: 467,867
  - Density: 181.4/km^{2} (469.9/sq mi)

Misungwi District is one of the seven districts of the Mwanza Region of Tanzania. It is bordered to the north by Nyamagana District and Magu District, to the east by Kwimba District, to the south by Shinyanga Rural District and to the west by Nyang'hwale District and Lake Victoria. Misungwi is often spelled with an extra 's' to make it Missungwi. The administrative centre is in the town of Misungwi.

As of 2012, the population of the Misungwi District was 351,607, of which 30,728 are living in an urban area (Misungwi town).

== Transport ==
Paved trunk road T8 from Shinyanga to Mwanza passes through Misungwi district from south to north.

The Central Line railway from Tabora to Mwanza passes through the district from east to west and there is one train station within the district's boundaries at the village of Fella.

== Administrative subdivisions ==
As of 2012, Misungwi District was divided into four divisions and 27 wards.

- Inonelwa
- Mbarika
- Misungwi
- Usagara

=== Wards ===
In 2016 Misungwi district was reorganized into twenty seven (27) wards which are;

- Buhingo
- Bulemeji
- Busongo
- Fella
- Gulumungu
- Idetemya
- Igokelo
- Ilujamate
- Isenengeja
- Isesa
- Kanyelele
- Kasololo
- Kijima (Misungwi)
- Koromije
- Lubili
- Mabuki
- Mamaye
- Misasi
- Mbarika
- Misungwi
- Mondo
- Mwaniko
- Nhundulu
- Shilalo
- Sumbugu
- Ukiriguru
- Usagara (Misungwi)
