= Chilonwa =

Administrative ward in Dodoma Region, Tanzania

Coordinates: 6°02′S 36°08′E

Chilonwa is an administrative ward in the Chamwino district of the Dodoma Region of Tanzania. According to the 2016 population estimates, the ward has a total population of 8,594.
