= Sengerema District =

Sengerema Halmashauri ya Wilaya ya Sengerema (Swahili)
- District
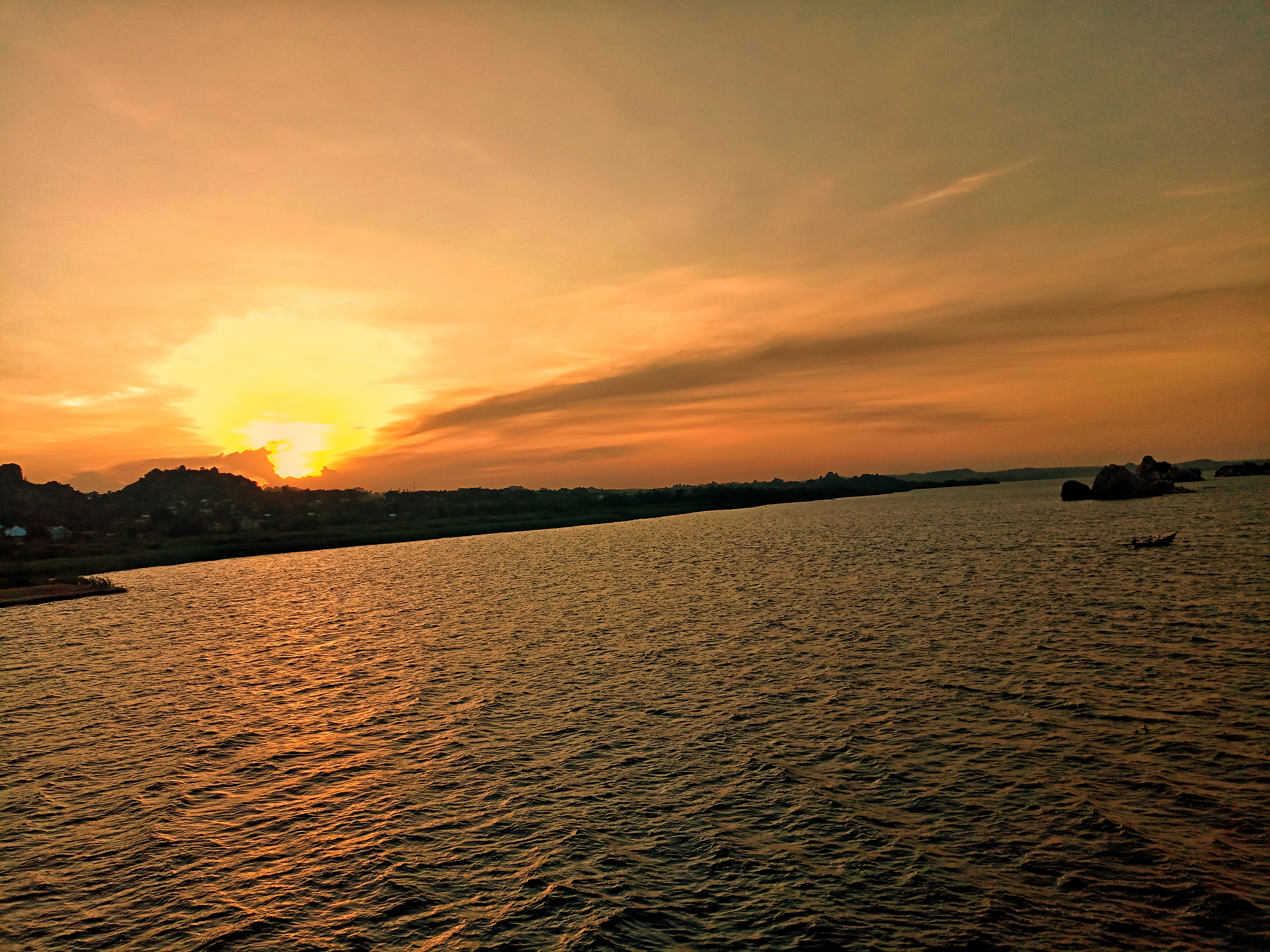
- Lake Victoria Sunset in Sengerema

- Sengerema District's location within Mwanza Region.
- Coordinates: 02°20′S 032°30′E
- Country: Tanzania
- Region: Mwanza Region
- District: Sengerema District
- Headquarters: Sengerema town

Government
  - Type: Council
  - Chairman: Yanga Makaga
  - Director: Binuru M. Shekidere

Area
  - District: 1,842 km^{2} (711 sq mi)
- Elevation: 1,400 m (4,600 ft)

Population (2022 census)
  - District: 425,415
  - Density: 231.0/km^{2} (598.2/sq mi)
  - Urban: 117,030
- Time zone: EAT
- Postcode: 333xx
- Area code: 028
- UFI: -2573399
- Website: District Website

Sengerema District is one of seven districts in the Mwanza Region of Tanzania, East Africa. Its administrative headquarter is located in Sengerema city. It is bordered to the north and east by Lake Victoria, to the south by Geita Region and to the southeast by the Misungwi District. Sengerema district is known for having numerous lake islands in its territory the largest are Maisome Island and Kome Island.

== Demographics ==
In 2016 the Tanzania National Bureau of Statistics report there were 377,649 people in the district, from 663,034 in 2012.

== Administrative subdivisions ==
Sengerema District is divided into 3 divisions, 26 wards, 71 villages and 421 hamlets (vitongoji).

=== Constituencies ===
For parliamentary elections, Tanzania is divided into constituencies. As of the 2010 elections Sengerema District had two constituencies:

- Buchosa Constituency
- Sengerema Constituency

=== Wards ===
Ward (2016 Population)

- Bitoto (5,904)
- Busisi (8,281)
- Buyagu (11,537)
- Buzilasoga (15,035)
- Chifunfu (26,337)
- Ibisabageni (14,932)
- Ibondo (1,691)
- Igalula (21,234)
- Igulumuki (10,096)
- Kagunga (22,322)
- Kahumulo (10,686)
- Kasenyi (17,562)
- Kasungamile (17,571)
- Katunguru (22,848)
- Kishinda (13,902)
- Mission (9,909)
- Mwabaluhi (12,215)
- Ngoma (11,070)
- Nyamatongo (19,013)
- Nyamazugo (11,381)
- Nyamizeze (7,039)
- Nyampande (10,781)
- Nyampulukano (25,175)
- Nyatukala (22,715)
- Sima (17,434)
- Tabaruka (10,979)
