= Ilemela District =

District in Tanzania

Ilemela District Wilaya ya Ilemela (Swahili)
- District
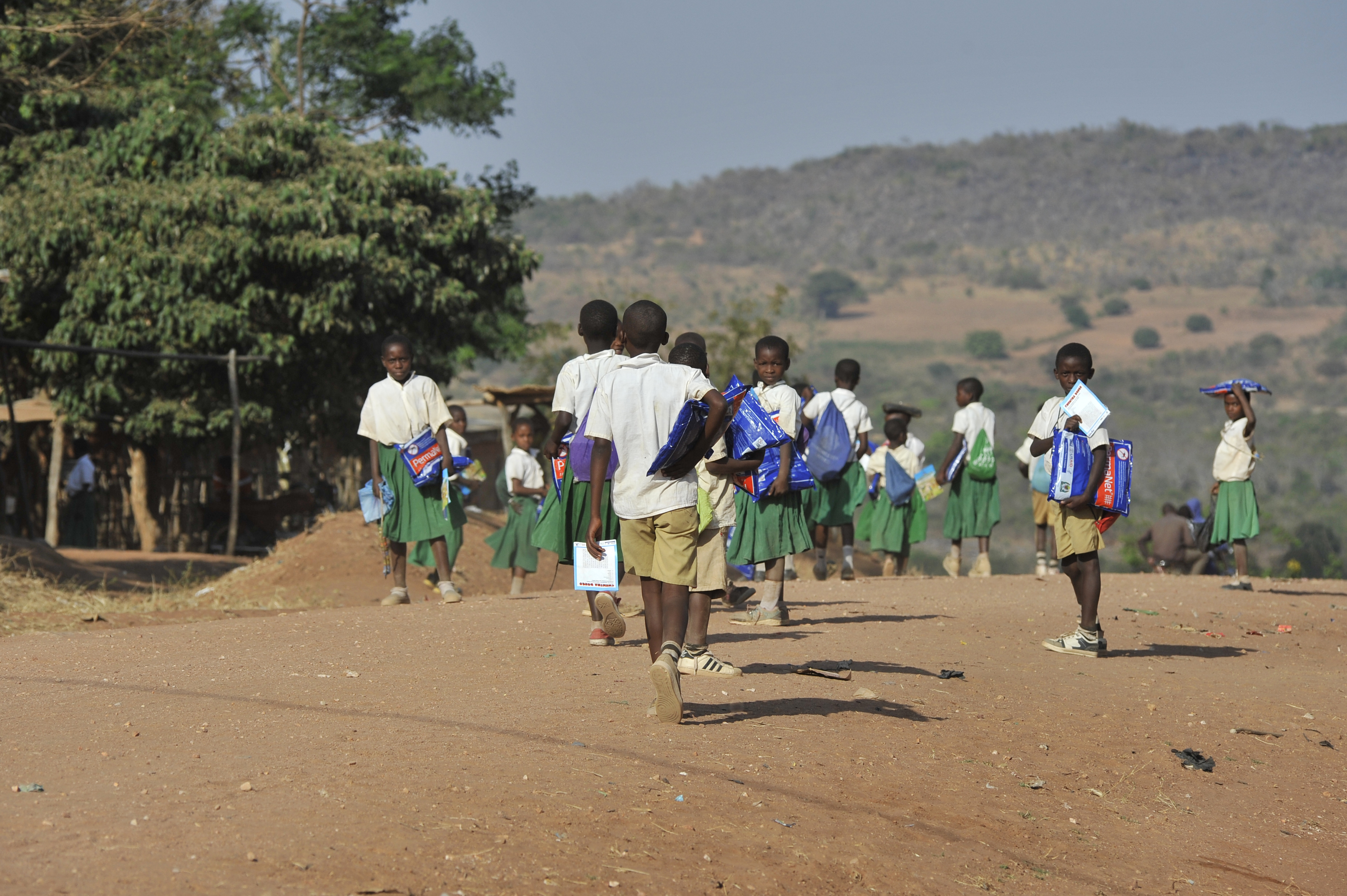

- Ilemela District of Mwanza Region
- Coordinates: 02°35′S 32°55′E
- Country: Tanzania
- Region: Mwanza Region
- District: Ilemela District
- Headquarters: Mwanza

Government
  - Type: Council
  - Chairman: Renatus Mulunga
  - Director: Mhandisi Modest Joseph Apolinary

Area
  - Total: 255.4 km^{2} (98.6 sq mi)

Population (2022 census)
  - Total: 509,687
  - Density: 1,996/km^{2} (5,169/sq mi)
- Time zone: EAT
- Postcode: 332xx
- Area code: 028
- Website: District Website

Ilemela District is one of the seven districts of the Mwanza Region of Tanzania with a postcode number 33200. It is bordered to the north and west by Lake Victoria, to the east by Magu District, and to the south by Nyamagana District. Part of the region's capital, the town of Mwanza, is within Ilemela District. The district commission's office is located in Buswelu area of Mwanza town.

In 2016 the Tanzania National Bureau of Statistics report there were 386,361 people in the district, from 343,001 in 2012.

Mwanza International Airport is located in Ilemela District.

== Geography ==
=== Administrative subdivisions ===
The district is divided into nineteen wards.

- Bugogwa
- Buswelu
- Buzuruga
- Ilemela Ward
- Ibungilo
- Kawekamo
- Kahama (Ilemela)
- Kayenze
- Kirumba
- Kitangiri
- Mecco
- Nyakato
- Nyamanoro
- Nyamongoro
- Nyasaka
- Pasiansi
- Sangabuye
- Shibula
- Kiseke
