= Nyamagana District =

- District
- Nyamagana District of Mwanza Region
- Coordinates: 02°35′S 032°55′E
- Country: Tanzania
- Region: Mwanza Region

Area
  - Total: 182.7 km^{2} (70.5 sq mi)

Population (2022 census)
  - Total: 594,834
  - Density: 3,256/km^{2} (8,432/sq mi)

Nyamagana District is one of the eight districts of the Mwanza Region of Tanzania. It is bordered to the north by Ilemela District, to the east by Magu District, to the south by Misungwi District and to the west by the Mwanza Bay of Lake Victoria. The region's capital, the City of Mwanza, is within Nyamagana District. The district commission's office is scheduled to be re-located to the Mkolani area of Mwanza town, but currently it is still in the old city hall in the centre of town.

As of 2022, the population of the Nyamagana District was 594,834.

== Wards ==
As of 2022, Nyamagana District was divided into eighteen wards.

=== 2022 wards ===
- Buhongwa
- Butimba
- Igogo
- Igoma
- Isamilo
- Kishiri
- Luchelele
- Lwanhima
- Mabatini
- Mahina
- Mbugani
- Mhandu
- Mirongo
- Mkolani
- Mkuyuni
- Nyamagana
- Nyegezi
- Pamba
