= Angeline Mabula =

Tanzanian politician

Honorable Angeline Mabula MP

Minister of Lands and Human Settlement Development
- In office 8 January 2022 – 31 August 2023
- President: Samia Suluhu
- Deputy: Ridhiwani Kikwete
- Preceded by: William Lukuvi
- Succeeded by: Jerry Silaa

Member of Parliament
- Incumbent
- Assumed office January 2022
- Preceded by: Highness Kiwia
- Constituency: Ilemela

Personal details
- Born: 6 May 1962 (age 64) Mwanza, Mwanza Region, Tanganyika
- Party: CCM
- Education: Open University of Tanzania

Angeline Mabula (born 6 May 1962) is a Tanzanian politician belonging to the ruling Chama Cha Mapinduzi (CCM) party. She was the Minister of lands and human settlement development until September 2023. She is a Member of Parliament for Ilemela.

== Background and education ==
Mabula was born on 6 May 1962. She completed her schooling from the Lake Secondary School in 1981. She is an accountant by profession. In 1982, she received a certificate degree in bookkeeping. She went on to receive advanced and post-graduate diplomas in Accountancy from the Institute of Financial Management in 1990 and 1991 respectively. She received the Certified Public Accountant designation from the National Board of Accountants and Auditors in 2000. In addition, she received a master's degree in community and economic development from the Open University of Tanzania. Mabula had a long career as an auditor in the Tanzanian Audit Corporation between 1984 and 2000. Between 2003 and 2009, she worked as an accountant for Caritas.

== Political career ==
Mabula became involved with CCM in 1990 and served in a number of party roles. Between 2009 and 2015, she served as District Commissioner for Muleba, Iringa and Butiama districts in succession.

Mabula was selected to represent CCM in the 2015 Tanzanian elections for the Illemela constituency, after she defeated four other candidates in a primary. In the election, she face incumbent CHADEMA MP, Highness Kiwia. Mabula won by vote margin of 85,424 to 61,769 votes. She faced insults during electioneering on account of her gender and the fact she was not married.

Mabula was appointed Deputy Minister in the Ministry for Lands and Human Settlement Development in the newly elected President John Magufuli's government after the 2015 elections. She continued into this role in the Suluhu Cabinet and was promoted to Minister in January 2022.
