= Mwanza Region =

Region of Tanzania

Mwanza Region Mkoa wa Mwanza (Swahili)
- Region
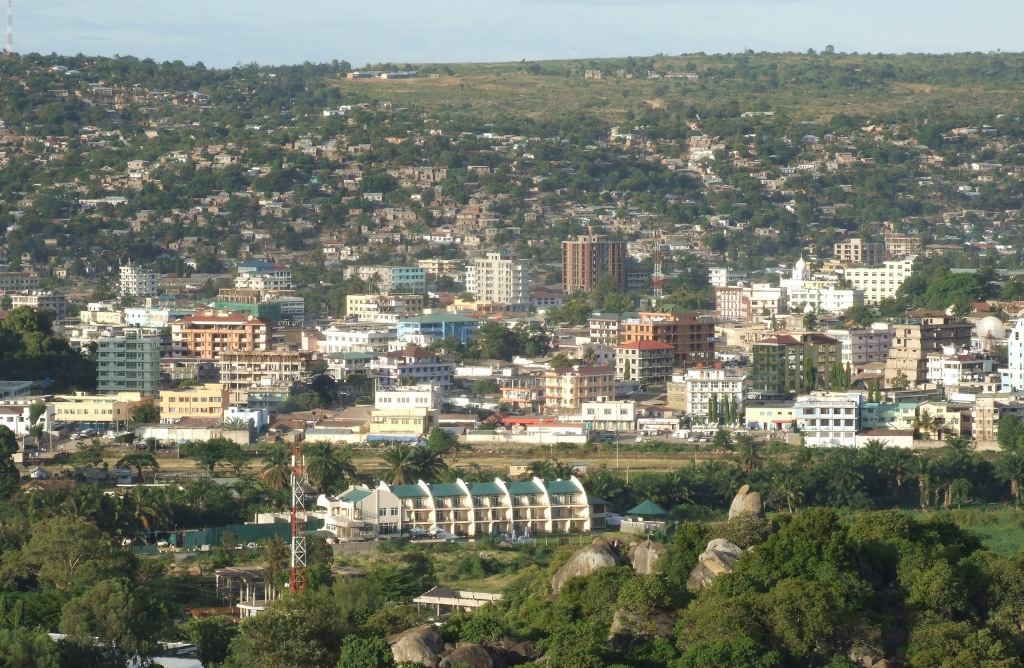
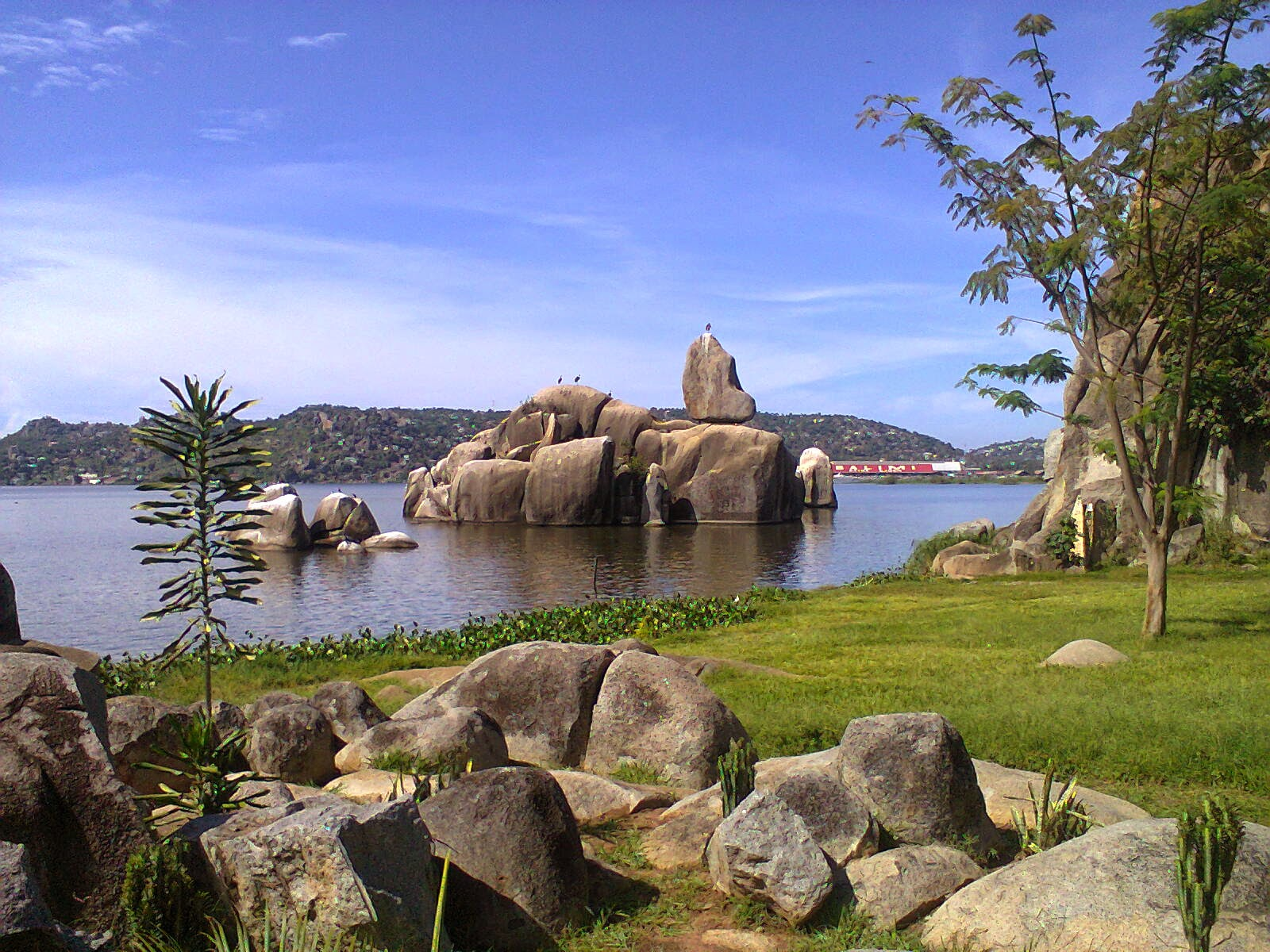
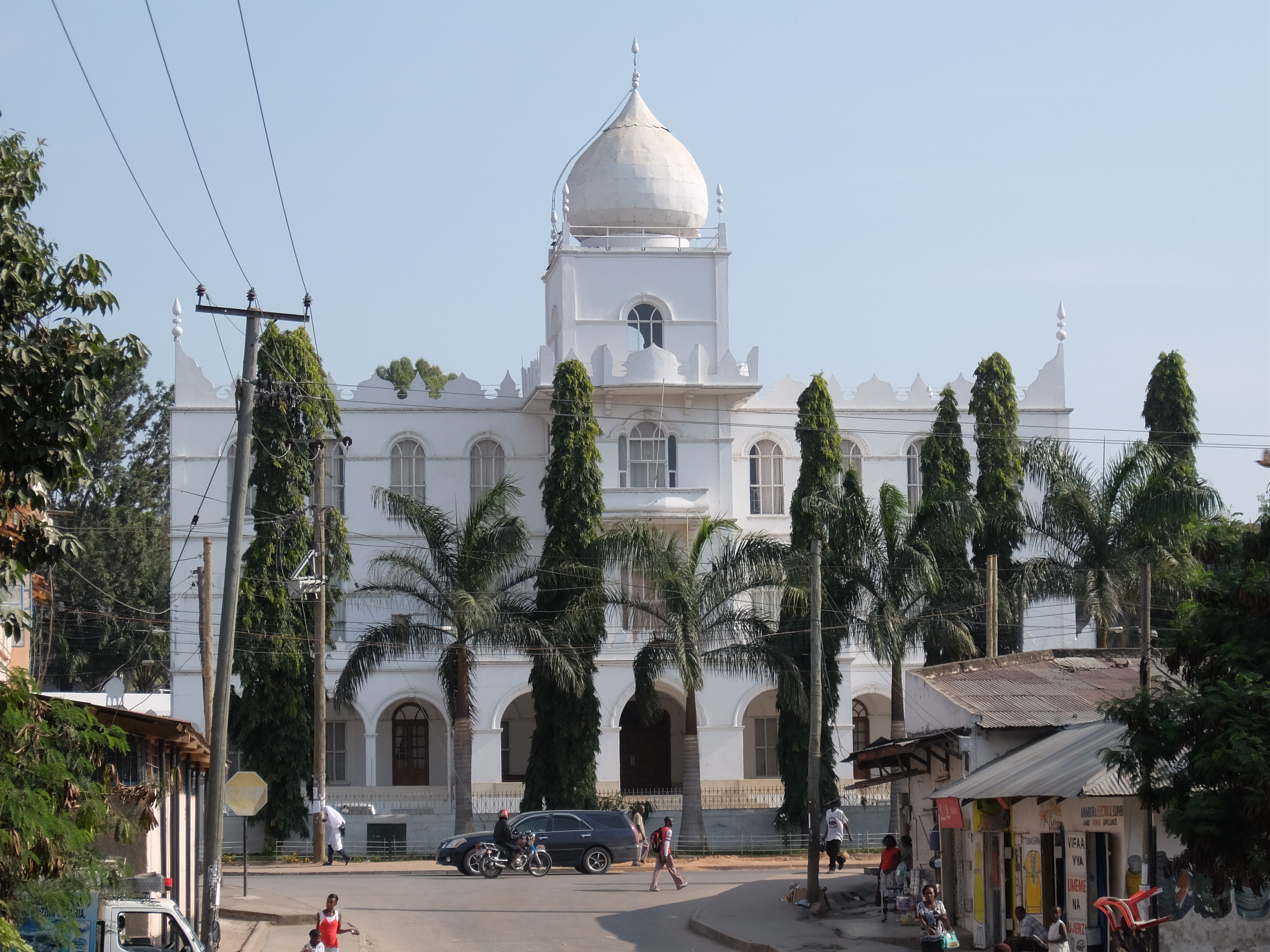
- From top to bottom: Mwanza City bird's eye view, Mwanza Rock, and Jamatkhana Mosque in Mwanza City
- Nicknames: The rock of Tanzania; The granite rock region
- Location in Tanzania
- Coordinates: 2°28′1.56″S 32°53′55.32″E
- Country: Tanzania
- Zone: Lake
- Region: 1961
- Capital: Mwanza
- Districts: List: Ilemela; Kwimba; Magu; Misungwi; Nyamagana; Sengerema; Ukerewe

Government
  - Regional Commissioner: Adam Malima (CCM)

Area
  - Total: 25,233 km^{2} (9,743 sq mi)
  - Land: 11,796 km^{2} (4,554 sq mi)
  - Water: 13,437 km^{2} (5,188 sq mi) 53.25%
  - Rank: 16th of 31
- Highest elevation (Katogoli): 1,471 m (4,826 ft)

Population (2022)
  - Total: 3,699,872
  - Rank: 2nd of 31
  - Density: 313.65/km^{2} (812.36/sq mi)
- Demonym: Mwanzan

Ethnic groups
  - Settler: Swahili
  - Native: Wasukuma, Wakerewe, Wakara & Wazinza
- Time zone: UTC+3 (EAT)
- Postcode: 33xxx
- Area code: 028
- ISO 3166 code: TZ-18
- HDI (2021): 0.523 low· 17th of 25
- Website: Official website
- Symbols of Tanzania
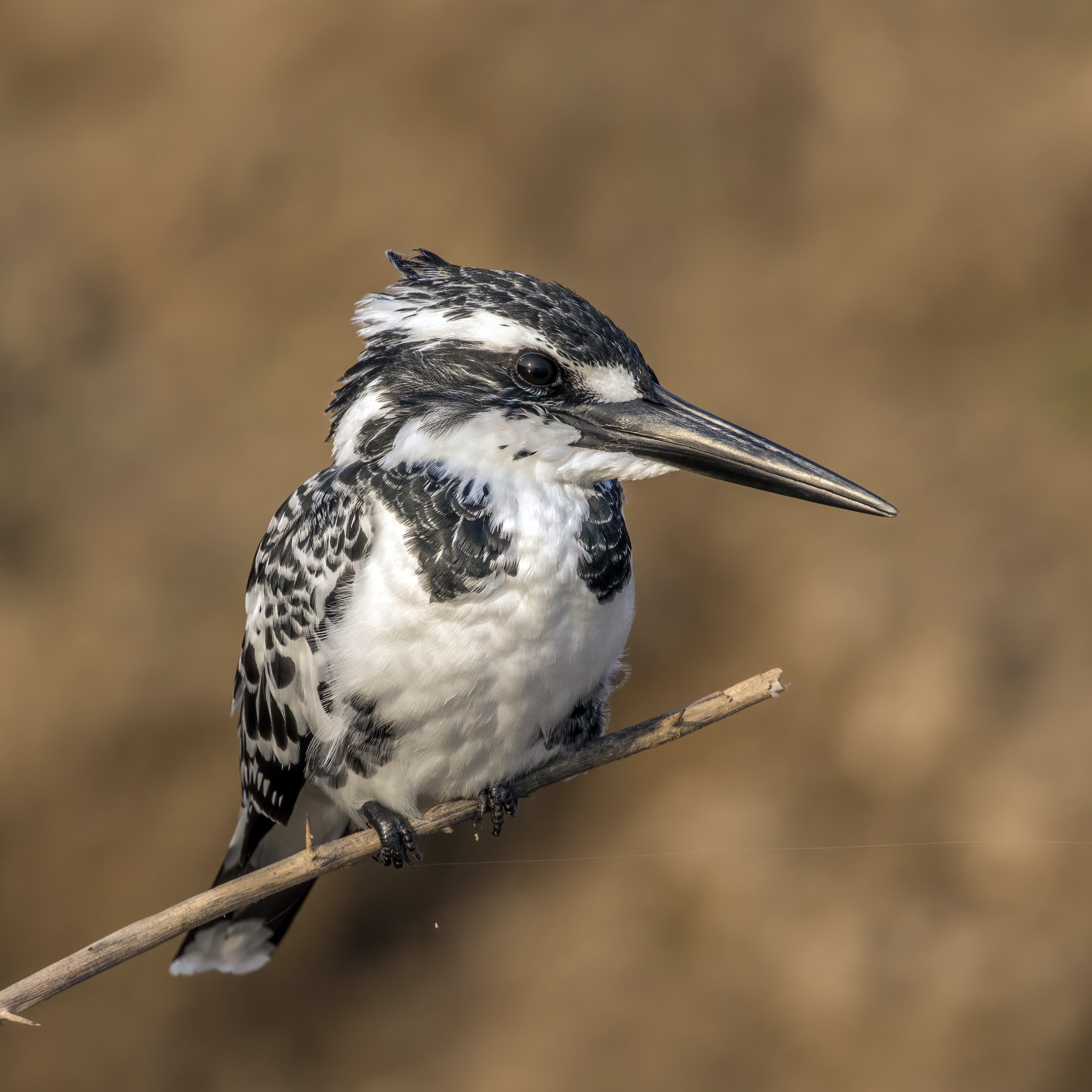
- Bird: Pied kingfisher

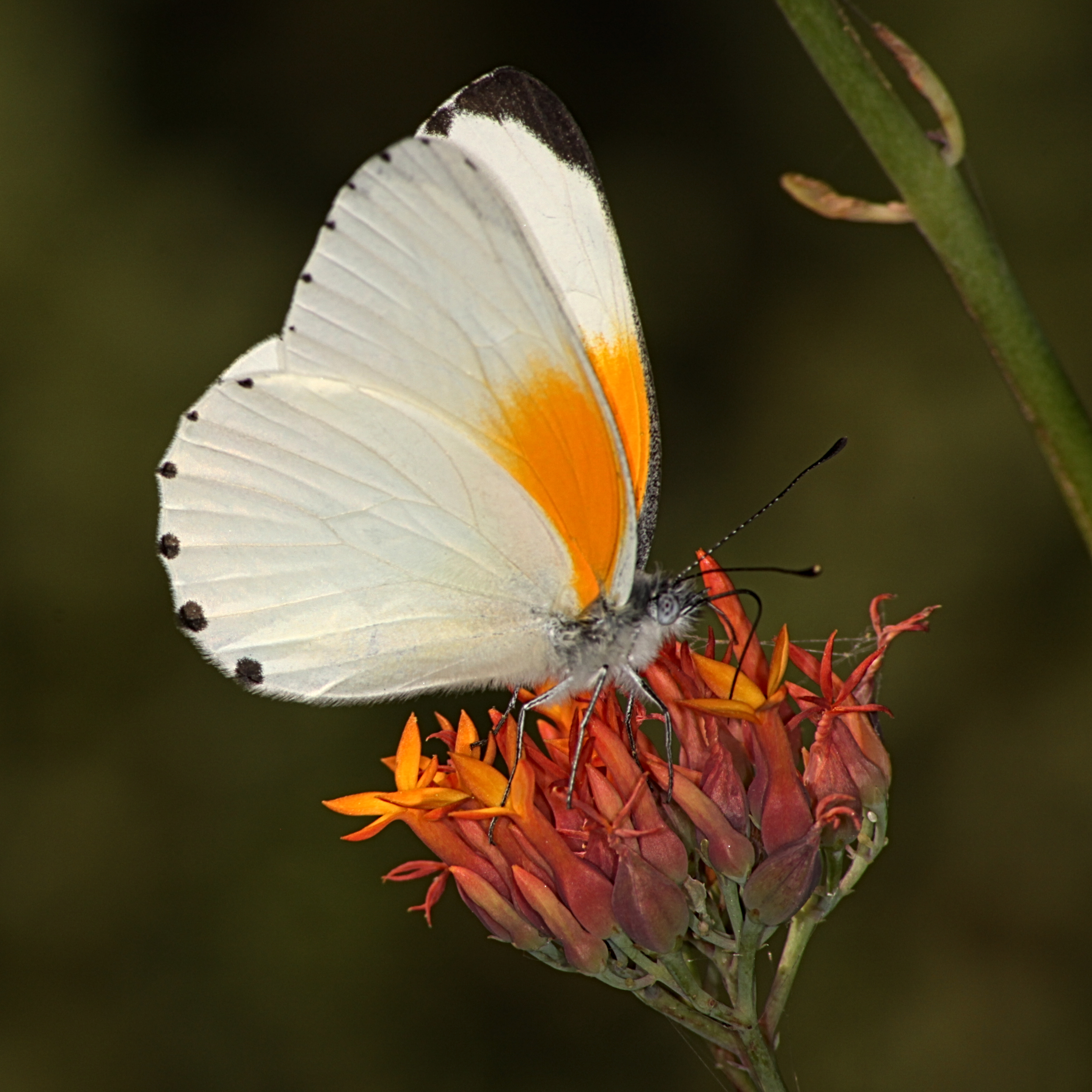
- Butterfly: Eastern Dotted Border

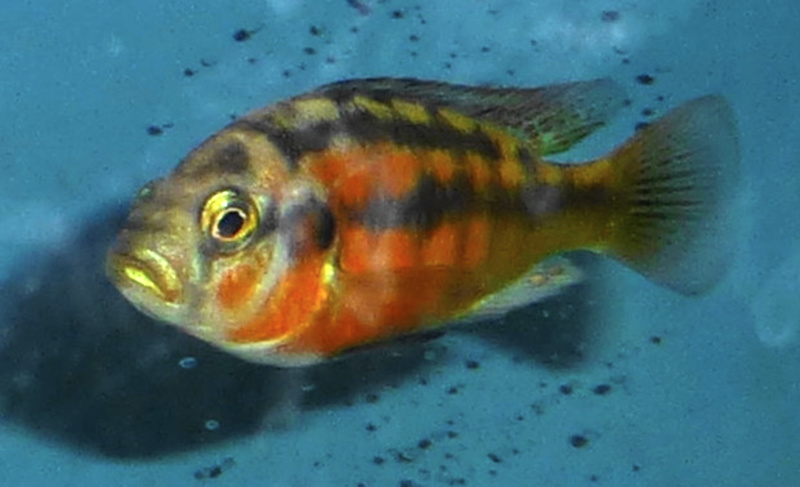
- Fish: Rock Kribensis

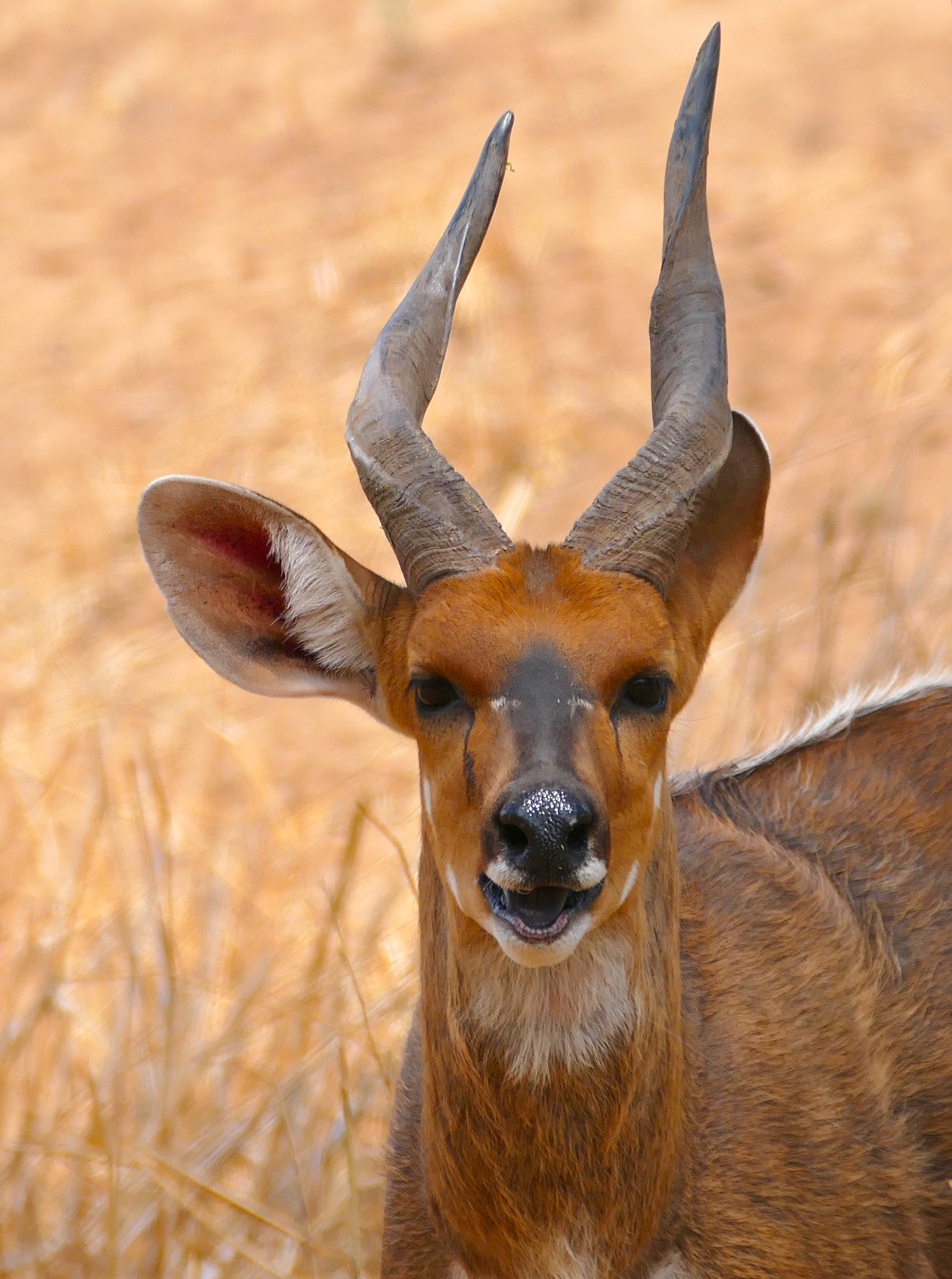
- Mammal: Bushbuck

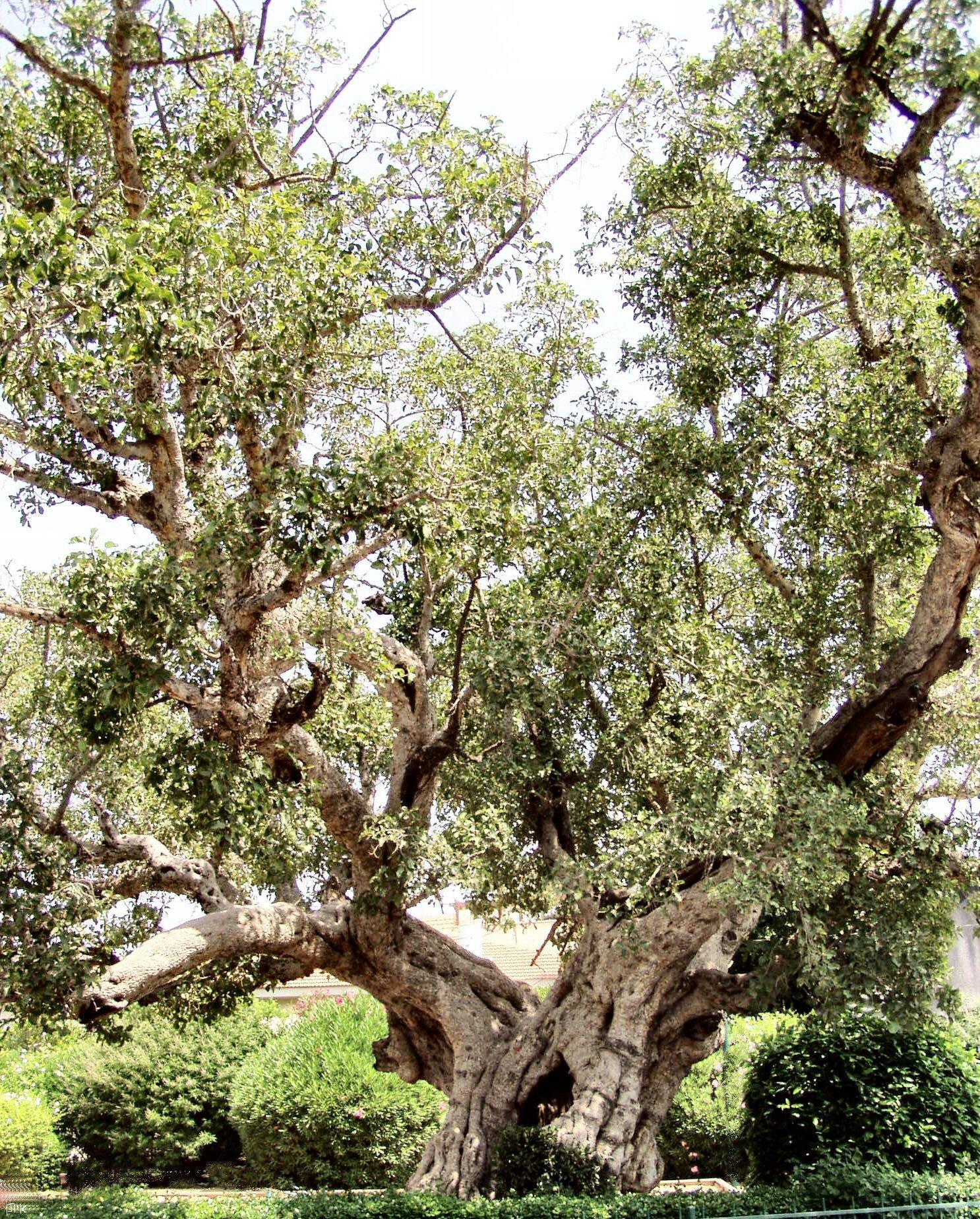
- Tree: Ficus sycomorus

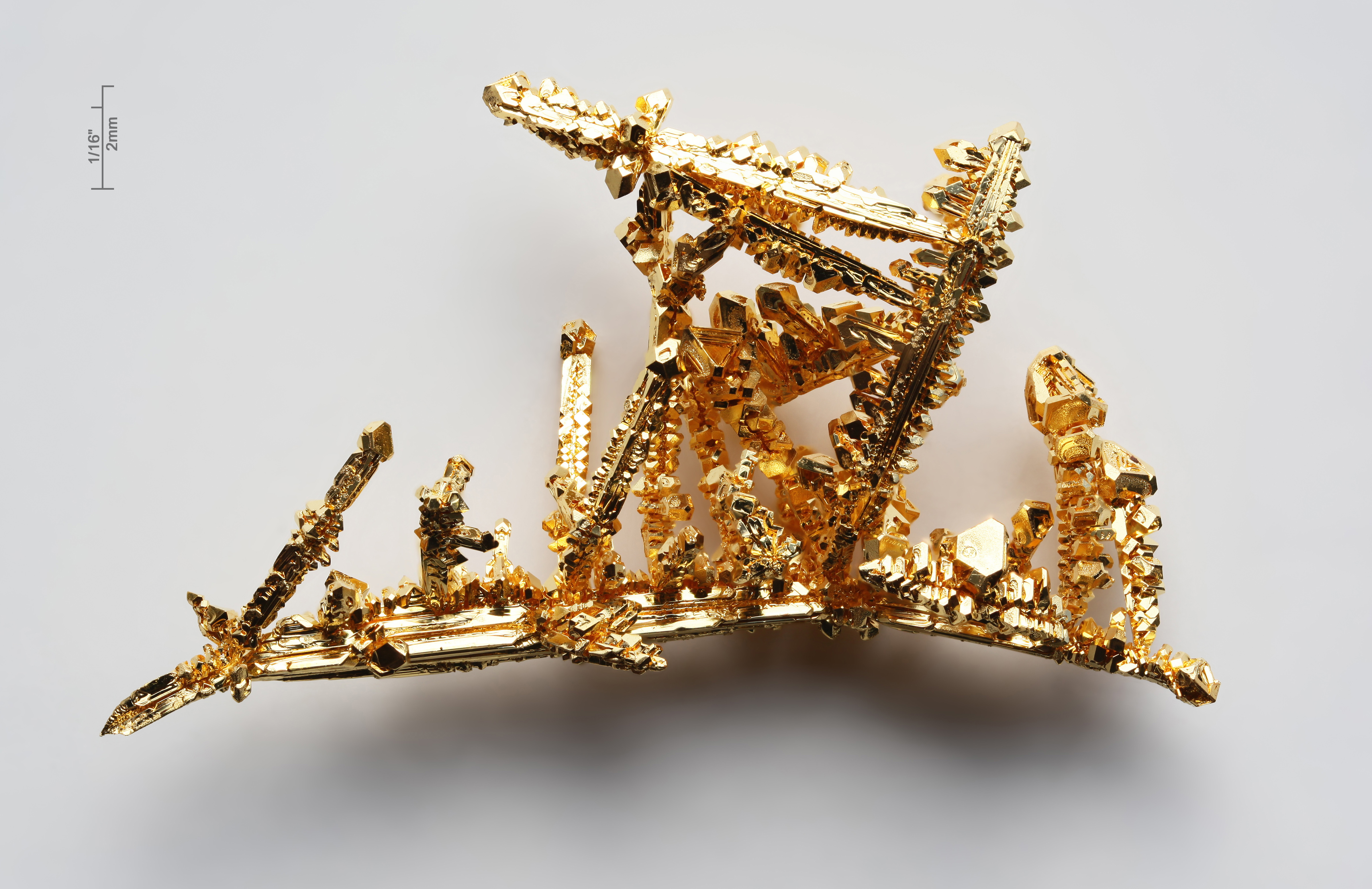
- Mineral: Gold

Mwanza Region (Mkoa wa Mwanza in Swahili) is one of Tanzania's 31 administrative regions, covering a total land area of 25,233 km^{2} (9,743 sq mi). Mwanza Region is bordered to the north through Lake Victoria by the Kagera Region and Mara Region, to the east by Simiyu Region, to the south by the Shinyanga Region and to the west by Geita Region. The regional capital is the city of Mwanza. According to the 2022 national census, the region had a population of 3,699,872 and national census of 2012 had 2,772,509. Mwanza Region is the second region with high population in Tanzania after Dar es Salaam Region.

== History ==
=== First communities ===
According to oral history, around c.1500 a group of around 250 Bantu people, from the shores north of modern Geita, looking for a new home. The group was led by the son of the king of the Lushamba Kingdom. When reaching what is near - and east of - today's Mwanza City, the son called out, "nye-nsukumale-aha", meaning "I, a Sukuma am here". It is from this phrase, and camp that the name Usukuma, (Sukumaland), and modern Mwanza is from.

From the 1500s the region, as well as many of the surrounding regions, would be part of the Sukuma kingdoms rather than villages, and for much of that time ruled from the area near modern-day city of Mwanza. Beginning from this time many people from very diverse backgrounds and tribes moved to Usukuma.

=== Colonial era ===
The Mwanza Region is home to the Basukuma, who are the largest and one of the oldest tribes in Tanzania and the Great Lakes. Prior to German colonization Sukuma had wealth from their large herds of cattle, good soil, and trade of gold, and ivory using the central corridor of Tabora.

In 1857, British explorers, Richard Francis Burton and John Hanning Speke mention "Muanza" as a settlement in 1858 and confirm the presence of the Basukuma on the Lake shore and at the island of Ukerewe. During the period the Germans established the port of Mwanza, in 1892, in order to govern the conquered Usukuma. The area governed by Mwanza was referred to by the colonizers as the Lake Zone and included the portions of Lake Victoria from Mara in the east to Kagera in the West, and as far south as Tabora and Kigoma, on Lake Tanganyika. This mostly continued with only little change after the British took over governance after World War I.

Colonial rule from Mwanza was limited comparatively to the rest of Tanzania and East Africa. Two main reasons for this is the Basukuma have never had a warrior culture and colonial governors had a large misunderstanding of how Sukuma governed. That Usukuma as a whole had a very large population and no warrior culture meant that less effort was required to govern such a large population. This led to colonial governors using and allowing local chiefs to rule rather than involve themselves, not understanding that political power was held by the councils of elders who appointed and dismissed the chiefs.

=== Post-colonial era ===
The Lake Zone, became the Lake Region after independence; thereafter, in 1963, the Mwanza Region was created and till nowadays it is led by the following regional commissioners: Richard Saimora Wambura (1961–1963), John Samuel Malecela (1963–1965), Joseph Kizurira Nyerere (1965–1967), Joseph Augustine Namata (1967–1969), Omary Muhaji (1970–1972), Lawi Nangwanda Sijaona (1972–1975), Peter Abdallah Kisumo (1975–1977), Brig Muhidin Mfaume Kimario (1977–1979), Abdulanur Suleiman (1979–1981), Daniel Madaha Machemba (1981–1987), Timothy Shindika (1987–1992), Philip Japhet Mangula (1992–1993), Ernest Kisumo Nyanda (1993–1994), William Ferdinand Shija (1994_1995), Meja Jen.James Eliute Luhanga (1995–1999), Stephen Joshua Mashishanga (1999–2003), Daniel Ole Njoolay (2003–2006), James Alex Msekela (2006–2009), Abbas Hussein Kandoro (2009–2011), Evarist Welleh Ndikiro (2011–2014), Magesa Stanslaus Mulongo (2014–2016), John Vianney Mongella (2016–2021), Adam Malima (2022–2024), Said Mtanda (2024-).

== Geography ==
The region covers an area of 25,233 square kilometres (9,743 sq mi), of which 13,437 km^{2} (5,188 sq mi) is water and 11,796 km^{2} (4,554 sq mi) dry land. Mwanza Region is home to Ukerewe Island, the largest lake island in Africa as well as Saanane Island National Park, the smallest national park in Tanzania. The major rivers found in the region are; Moame River, Isanga River, Mirongo River, Nyarua River and Ndemabolia River. The region is situated between 1200 and 1,400 meters above sea level on Lake Victoria's southern shore.The area is primarily flat, with little mountains and hills made of granite stone strewn about. Rainwater from the plains flows into Lake Victoria in the north. The "mbuga soil" ranges in texture from sand to sandy loam to sand-clay or loam-clay.

== Economy ==
According to the 2012 census, agriculture accounted for around 62.8 per cent of the economically active population (crops and livestock). The remainder of the population is engaged with simple jobs (7%) trade and small companies (6.1%), crafts (4.9%), and fishing (3.3 per cent). The region's Gross Domestic Product (GDP) was TZS 7,451,706 million in 2016, and its GDP per person was TZS 2,004,353, according to the 2017 Tanzania Human Development Report. Out of 26 regions, the region's GDP per capita came in at number seven.

The HDI for the region is 0.646, which places it eighth nationally and is higher than the national HDI of 0.614 as of 2016. The MPI index has a score of 0.228, placing it 14th overall and somewhat below the national average index of 0.217. However, the poverty rate8 in the Mwanza region was 49.01%, which is just somewhat higher than the national rate of 47.40%. Mwanza was placed 14th in the nation for the average degree of poverty, with 46.55% of its residents experiencing severe poverty, compared to 45.48% nationwide. In Mwanza, the population's vulnerability to poverty was 26.57%, which was somewhat lower than the national average of 27.69.

=== Agriculture ===
The predominant subsistence farming practiced by the community with a few commercial farms is the dominant characteristic of the economy of Mwanza Region. Only 61% of the suitable arable land, are crops grown. The most common crop, maize, makes up 51.8% of the planted area and is primarily grown in Buchosa, Kwimba, and Misungwi districts. Cassava is the second most common crop, growing primarily in Kwimba, Buchosa, and Ukerewe. Rice is the third most common crop, predominantly grown in Magu and Ukerewe. In the entire region, cotton is the most common cash crop, accounting for 5,521,511 ha annually, compared to 131,547 ha for maize, 75,940 ha for cassava, and 18,921 ha for paddy. During the same period from 2010/11 to 2014/15, 56,906 tonnes of cotton are typically produced in the area each year, accounting for 47.5 per cent of the region's farmers' cash crops and providing 26.2 per cent of agricultural income.

The region's primary producers of fruits and vegetables are Buchosa, Magu, Ukerewe, and Ilemela with the surpluses shipped to Dar es Salaam. In 2015, Buchosa has horticulture crops growing on more than 307.8 acres, including mangoes and pineapples. Magu has been cultivating horticulture products as a second crop using residual moisture on a portion of the 1,178 acres designated for rice. In 2015, Ilemela had 40 hectares. The Ngongoseke Farm, a 12-hectare greenhouse in Magu, and the fringes of the municipality of Ilemela also engage in greenhouse farming (products sold in Arusha, Mwanza and Dar). Given that just 2,884 ha of the region's 10,649 hectares of arable land are currently irrigated, there is a restricted usage of irrigation in the area. Paddy and horticultural crops like tomatoes, egg plants, watermelon, and cabbage are grown with irrigation.

The region had 1,155,871 indigenous cattle, 523,145 goats, and 138,917 sheep in 2016 according to a recent livestock census, some of which might be processed into meat. Additionally, there were 2,588,438 chickens, 61,677 pigs, 6,985 donkeys, and 19,244 enhanced dairy cows. Cattle ownership was most prevalent in Kwimba (34%), then Misungwi (21%), Magu (18%), and Sengerema (16 per cent). An estimated 172,977 acres of land is suitable for grazing, of which 70.5 per cent (121,874 ha) are already in use for that purpose.

Ukerewe, Magu, Mwanza City, Sengerema, Ilemela, Misungwi, and Buchosa districts are the primary fishing hotspots in the area. With approximately 27,629 fishermen and 6,743 registered vessels engaged in fishing, the region issued 33,582 fishing licenses in 2015. 2015 saw a catch of 38,165.6 million tons of fish worth TZS 187 billion. Residents in Ilemela MC, Sengerema DC, and Ukerewe were responsible for the majority of the income.

=== Industry ===
According to a 2015 industrial census, the Mwanza region came in fourth overall in terms of the number of large-scale manufacturing enterprises in the nation, behind Dar es Salaam, Arusha, and Kagera. Small scale enterprises (96%) and medium scale industries (3%) that are involved in various types of manufacturing make up the majority of the region's industrial economy (Figure 3). The distribution of the 2,420 small-scale industries by council in 2015 was as follows: Due to the newness of the council, data on small scale industries were lacking for the Ukerewe district council (31.5%), Magu (6.7%), Mwanza city (17.8%), Kwimba (8.8%), Sengerema (4.5%), Ilemela (23.9%), Misungwi (6.8%), and Buchosa.

Among the businesses, there were 873 industries that dealt with maize milling (36%) 505 industries that dealt with carpentry (21%), and 392 industries that dealt with services (16 per cent). Another 303 industries provided welding services (13%) while 314 industries processed timber (13%) 28 industries processed food (1.0%), and the final 5 industries (0.9%) processed sunflower oil. Mwanza city (60.9%), Ilemela (18.3%), Magu (13.7%), and Misungwi (6.8%) of the total of 87 industries that were available in the region during the survey in 2015 and an additional 7 that were formed after the 2012 Census were distributed as medium scale industries by council in 2015. The number of large-scale industries accessible in the region in 2015 was divided as follows by council: Mwanza city (12 industries), Ilemela (7 industries), and Misungwi (1 industry).

The Mwanza region is endowed with minerals. The majority of commercial mining activities are still in the survey stage, and largely foreign corporations are conducting research to determine the quantity and grade of mineral reserves. At Misungwi, Ilemela, and Mwanza City Council, local enterprises have so far primarily invested in small scale mining operations (largely extracting gold, quarrying, and sand minerals). Additionally, in the Mwanza region, there are more than 25 financial institutions that offer financial services.

=== Tourism ===
Though the region is home to the second largest population in the country, Mwanza is primarily a business hub. However, the Mwanza region has tourism infrastructure in place. Each district in the region has recognized unique tourist destinations, from cultural landmarks like the Sukuma Cultural Museums to Saa nane Island's biodiversity at Saanane Island National Park.

=== Infrastructure ===
Mwanza Region is well connected by road, rail, water and air transport. Paved trunk road T4 that encircles Lake Victoria, coming from Kenya to Uganda, through the Mara Region through the Magu, Ilemela, Nyamagana, Misungwi, and Sengerema continuing to west into the Geita and Kagera Regions before finally crossing into Uganda. Paved trunk road T8 starts in Mwanza City at T4, ending in Mbeya at T1. It goes south through the Nyamagana, Misungwi, and Kwimba districts continuing through the Shinyanga, Tabora, Singida, and Mbeya. Currently the Kigongo–Busisi Bridge is being built to connect the Mwanza Region to the Geita Region across the Gulf of Mwanza of Lake Victoria.

==== Railways ====
The Mwanza branch of the Central Line railway passes through the region on its way from Mwanza to Tabora and there are several stations within the region's borders. The Mwanza branch of the Tanzania SGR has been under construction, beginning in 2021, to connect through Isaka to the rest of the national SGR network currently being built. The Mwanza to Isaka section is phase 5 of the SGR project, and is being built by the two Chinese companies China Civil Engineering Construction (CCEC) and China Railway Construction Company (CRCC), and is paid for with a loan through the China government.

==== Maritime transport ====
Ferries connect Ukerewe Island with Mwanza city. Other ferries operate between Mwanza and Sengerema District.

==== Air transport ====
Mwanza Airport is located within the region's boundaries, in the city of Mwanza.

== Population ==
The Sukuma tribe is the majority people group in Mwanza, Shinyanga, Geita, and Simiyu Regions together traditionally known as Usukuma or Sukumaland. Additionally on the Lake Victoria islands and shores of the Mwanza Region are also the Kerewe, Kara and Zinza, with Wakerewe and Wakara in the east, particularly Ukerewe Island, and Wazinza in the western shores and islands also in Geita Region. Those of other tribes commonly found in Mwanza, mostly in ports and cities, are the Haya, Nyamwezi, Sumbwa, Kuria, Luo, Jita, and Shashi.

=== Demographics ===
In 2022 the Tanzania National Bureau of Statistics census there were 3,699,872 people in the region, from 2,772,509 in 2012. For 2002–2012, the region's 3.0 per cent average annual population growth rate was the eighth highest in the country. It was also the sixth most densely populated region in 2012 with 120 inhabitants per square kilometre (310/sq mi).

=== Culture ===
East of Mwanza City is the Bujora Cultural Center with a church and the Sukuma Museum. At the cultural center is education about kisukuma, Basukuma history, and architecture. Additionally the cultural center has tours, camping, music, dancing, workshops, and other cultural activities. Mwanza city's Makongoro Road is named after a prominent Sukuma chief who controlled the area in the late 1800s.

While the Mwanza Region is most famous for its ngoma, all aspects of modern Tanzanian culture and music is widely present. Performances and clubs of taarab, bongo flava, dansi, kwaya and other popular Tanzanian music can be found throughout the city of Mwanza, although less common outside the city. Singeli music has been gaining in popularity in the 2020s, and can also be found in some clubs both inside and outside the city.

Mwanza Region is known for its ngoma, dances, performed. The types of dances vary depending on the type and reasons for the dance. Some for relaxing, others for competing. Some for entertainment, others for ritual. Wigashe is a dance that has been performed since at least the 1800s. The two most well known groups being the bugika and bugalu whose founders Ngika and Gumha are said to have created wigashe, and many other dances. While those are still the two most known groups, today there are countless more groups and dances. Wigashe often is done from sitting in chairs using rattles and flutes while singing and dancing from sitting position, with upper body and stomping. It is most common for relaxing after doing hard work, but other times can become a competition. Other dances being buchwezi that usually involves snakes, often large pythons, and porcupines, and bugobogobo which is done while farming, particularly as dancing while harvesting.

== Administrative divisions ==
=== Districts ===
Mwanza Region is divided into seven districts, each administered by a council:

Districts of Mwanza Region
Map	District	Population (2012)
	Buchosa District	369,201
	Ilemela District^{*}	343,001
	Kwimba District	406,509
	Magu District	299,759
	Misungwi District	351,607
	Nyamagana District^{*}	363,452
	Sengerema District	663,034
	Ukerewe District	345,147
Total		2,772,509

Note: ^{*}municipal district council representing the city of Mwanza

== Health and Education ==
=== Education ===
The Mwanza region has people who are sufficiently literate and are suitable for any form of average intensive technology, according to the Tanzania Human Development Report (THDR 2017), which places the region's expected years of schooling at 9.7, placing it eighth out of the 26 Tanzania Mainland regions. In Mwanza, more than 90% of residents have completed at least their primary education, 13% have completed their secondary education, and 3.2% have completed some sort of post-primary or post-secondary education. Despite the seeming low percentage of persons with post-secondary education, the country's labor laws are pliable and permit businesses to hire employees from any location within the nation.

== Notable persons from Mwanza Region ==
- William Shija, politician
- Gertrude Mongella, politician
- Aniceti Kitereza, cleric and writer
- Euphrase Kezilahabi, poet
- Gabriel Ruhumbika, novist
- Cool James, musician
- Hamisa Mobetto, model
- Richa Adhia, model
- Ruhi Hamid, Tanzanian born, British film maker
- Amir H. Jamal, politician and diplomat
- Baby Madaha, actress and musician
- Shukrani Manya, politician
- Ally Hamis Ng'anzi, footballer
- Renatus Leonard Nkwande, archbishop
- Rakesh Rajani, civil service leader
- Gabriel Ruhumbika, novelist
- Pritam Singh Sandhu, Tanzanian born, Kenyan olympian
- Henry Joseph Shindika, footballer
- Stergomena Tax, politician
- Baby Madaha, actress and musician
- Mrisho Ngasa, Striker Tanzania National Football Team
- Charles Kabigumila, A pastor
- Fareed Kubanda a.k.a Fid Q, Top of Rap Elite in Tanzania ( TORE)
