= List of MPs elected in the 2010 Tanzania general election =

10th Parliament of Tanzania
←	9th	11th	→

Overview
- Legislative body: Parliament of Tanzania
- Jurisdiction: Tanzania
- Meeting place: Parliament House, Dodoma
- Term: 2010 – 2015
- Website: www.parliament.go.tz

National Assembly
- Members: 357
- Speaker: Anne Makinda
- Deputy Speaker: Job Ndugai
- Prime Minister: Mizengo Pinda
- Party control: Chama Cha Mapinduzi

The 10th Parliament of Tanzania was the legislature of Tanzania following the 2010 general election of Members of Parliament (MPs) to the unicameral National Assembly.

== Graphical representation ==
The National Assembly has a total of 357 seats. This includes the 239 directly contested parliamentary constituencies.

Party key	Chama Cha Mapinduzi	CCM
Party key	Tanzania Labour Party	TLP
Party key	United Democratic Party	UDP
Party key	National Convention for Construction and Reform – Mageuzi	NCCR–Mageuzi
Party key	Chama cha Demokrasia na Maendeleo	CHADEMA
Party key	Civic United Front	CUF

↓ 50%
186	1	1	4	23	24
Chama Cha Mapinduzi	L	U	N	CHADEMA	CUF

== List of MPs elected in the general election ==
Region	Constituency	Portrait	Title	Name	Party	Votes	Per cent
Arusha	Arumeru East		Hon.	Jeremiah Sumari	CCM	34,661	62.23
Arusha	Arumeru West		Hon.	Goodluck Ole-Medeye	CCM	36,075	54.89
Arusha	Arusha Urban		Hon.	Godbless Lema	CHADEMA	56,196	57.68
Arusha	Karatu		Hon. Rev.	Israel Natse	CHADEMA	41,109	59.18
Arusha	Longido		Hon.	Michael Laizer	CCM	17,687	86.81
Arusha	Monduli		Hon.	Edward Lowassa	CCM	30,236	90.93
Arusha	Ngorongoro		Hon.	Kaika Telele	CCM	17,507	80.12
Dar es Salaam	Ilala		Hon.	Mussa Zungu	CCM	25,940	66.77
Dar es Salaam	Kawe		Hon.	Halima Mdee	CHADEMA	43,365	43.17
Dar es Salaam	Kigamboni		Hon. Dr.	Faustine Ndugulile	CCM	53,389	50.07
Dar es Salaam	Kinondoni		Hon.	Idd Azzan	CCM	51,372	49.18
Dar es Salaam	Segerea		Hon.	Milton Mahanga	CCM	43,554	41.70
Dar es Salaam	Temeke		Hon.	Abas Mtemvu	CCM	58,339	48.21
Dar es Salaam	Ubungo		Hon.	John Mnyika	CHADEMA	66,742	49.56
Dar es Salaam	Ukonga		Hon.	Eugen Mwaiposa	CCM	28,000	53.07
Dodoma	Bahi		Hon.	Omary Badwel	CCM	30,266	91.10
Dodoma	Chilonwa		Hon.	Hezekiah Chibulunje	CCM	19,021	80.57
Dodoma	Dodoma Urban		Hon.	David Mallole	CCM	52,426	71.06
Dodoma	Kibakwe		Hon.	George Simbachawene	CCM	22,418	77.12
Dodoma	Kondoa North		Hon.	Zabein Mhita	CCM	33,413	59.74
Dodoma	Kondoa South		Hon.	Juma Nkamia	CCM	38,876	79.49
Dodoma	Kongwa		Hon.	Job Ndugai	CCM	Unopposed	–
Dodoma	Mpwapwa		Hon.	Gregory Teu	CCM	Unopposed	–
Dodoma	Mtera		Hon.	Livingstone Lusinde	CCM	23,612	80.02
Iringa	Iringa Urban		Hon. Rev.	Peter Msigwa	CHADEMA	17,352	50.38
Iringa	Ismani		Hon.	William Lukuvi	CCM	Unopposed	–
Iringa	Kalenga		Hon.	William Mgimwa	CCM	31,421	84.39
Iringa	Kilolo		Hon. Prof.	Peter Msolla	CCM	45,719	90.97
Iringa	Ludewa		Hon.	Deo Filikunjombe	CCM	Unopposed	–
Iringa	Makete		Hon. Dr.	Binilith Mahenge	CCM	22,290	83.44
Iringa	Mufindi North		Hon.	Mahmoud Mgimwa	CCM	Unopposed	–
Iringa	Mufindi South		Hon.	Mendrad Kigola	CCM	Unopposed	–
Iringa	Njombe North		Hon.	Deo Sanga	CCM	29,644	73.17
Iringa	Njombe South		Hon.	Anne Makinda	CCM	Unopposed	–
Iringa	Njombe West		Hon. Eng.	Gerson Lwenge	CCM	29,743	66.87
Kagera	Biharamulo West		Hon.	Antony Mbassa	CHADEMA	20,828	48.40
Kagera	Bukoba Rural		Hon.	Jason Rweikiza	CCM	57,649	82.69
Kagera	Bukoba Urban		Hon. Amb.	Khamis Kagasheki	CCM	18,491	55.92
Kagera	Chato		Hon. Dr.	John Magufuli	CCM	36,142	66.39
Kagera	Karagwe		Hon.	Gosbert Blandes	CCM	36,063	52.78
Kagera	Kyerwa		Hon.	Eustace Katagira	CCM	40,260	61.82
Kagera	Nkenge		Hon.	Assumpter Mshama	CCM	23,772	94.74
Kagera	Muleba North		Hon.	Charles Mwijage	CCM	30,886	79.74
Kagera	Muleba South		Hon. Prof.	Anna Tibaijuka	CCM	Unopposed	–
Kagera	Ngara		Hon.	Deogratias Ntukamazina	CCM	37,502	61.43
Kigoma	Buyungu		Hon. Eng.	Christopher Chiza	CCM	17,040	50.56
Kigoma	Kasulu Rural		Hon.	Agripina Buyogera	NCCR–Mageuzi	26,130	54.58
Kigoma	Kasulu Urban		Hon.	Moses Machali	NCCR–Mageuzi	15,299	44.92
Kigoma	Kigoma North		Hon.	Zitto Kabwe	CHADEMA	23,366	49.50
Kigoma	Kigoma South		Hon.	David Kafulila	NCCR–Mageuzi	23,162	40.34
Kigoma	Kigoma Urban		Hon.	Peter Serukamba	CCM	20,594	47.87
Kigoma	Manyovu		Hon.	Albert Ntabaliba	CCM	20,954	44.81
Kigoma	Muhambwe		Hon.	Felix Mkosamali	NCCR–Mageuzi	25,574	56.46
Kilimanjaro	Hai		Hon.	Freeman Mbowe	CHADEMA	28,585	51.63
Kilimanjaro	Moshi Rural		Hon. Dr.	Cyril Chami	CCM	31,530	58.92
Kilimanjaro	Moshi Urban		Hon.	Philemon Ndesamburo	CHADEMA	28,697	62.31
Kilimanjaro	Mwanga		Hon. Prof.	Jumanne Maghembe	CCM	20,638	78.49
Kilimanjaro	Rombo		Hon.	Joseph Selasini Shao	CHADEMA	32,010	49.94
Kilimanjaro	Same East		Hon.	Anne Malecela	CCM	16,212	61.18
Kilimanjaro	Same West		Hon. Dr.	David Mathayo David	CCM	22,959	83.16
Kilimanjaro	Siha		Hon.	Aggrey Mwanri	CCM	15,255	64.38
Kilimanjaro	Vunjo		Hon.	Augustino Mrema	Labour	29,047	52.71
Lindi	Lindi Urban		Hon.	Salum Barwany	CUF	13,155	51.44
Lindi	Kilwa North		Hon.	Murtaza Mangungu	CCM	13,019	61.40
Lindi	Kilwa South		Hon.	Selemani Bungara	CUF	14,610	49.55
Lindi	Liwale		Hon.	Faith Mitambo	CCM	16,594	58.15
Lindi	Mchinga		Hon.	Saidi Mtanda	CCM	10,579	56.67
Lindi	Mtama		Hon.	Bernard Membe	CCM	26,625	81.76
Lindi	Nachingwea		Hon.	Mathias Chikawe	CCM	26,319	61.23
Lindi	Ruangwa		Hon.	Majaliwa K. Majaliwa	CCM	27,671	72.98
Manyara	Babati Rural		Hon.	Jitu Soni	CCM	32,777	44.32
Manyara	Babati Urban		Hon.	Kisyeri Chambiri	CCM	13,506	64.58
Manyara	Hanang		Hon.	Mary Nagu	CCM	34,338	59.67
Manyara	Mbulu		Hon.	Mustapha Akunaay	CHADEMA	48,428	63.39
Manyara	Kiteto		Hon.	Benedict Ole-Nangoro	CCM	25,308	61.87
Manyara	Simanjiro		Hon.	Christopher Ole-Sendeka	CCM	Unopposed	–
Mara	Bunda		Hon.	Stephen Wasira	CCM	27,509	66.10
Mara	Musoma Rural		Hon.	Nimrod Mkono	CCM	Unopposed	–
Mara	Musoma Urban		Hon.	Vincent Nyerere	CHADEMA	22,463	59.62
Mara	Mwibara		Hon.	Alphaxard Lugola	CCM	18,202	61.88
Mara	Rorya		Hon.	Lameck Okambo	CCM	45,800	71.26
Mara	Serengeti		Hon. Dr.	Stephen Kebwe	CCM	27,616	56.03
Mara	Tarime		Hon.	Nyambari Nyangwine	CCM	28,064	38.49
Mbeya	Ileje		Hon.	Aliko Kibona	CCM	24,126	83.69
Mbeya	Kyela		Hon. Dr.	Harrison Mwakyembe	CCM	41,214	88.76
Mbeya	Lupa		Hon.	Victor Mwambalaswa	CCM	12,202	55.05
Mbeya	Mbarali		Hon.	Modestus Kilufi	CCM	34,869	65.43
Mbeya	Mbeya Urban		Hon.	Osmund Mbilinyi	CHADEMA	49,084	63.20
Mbeya	Mbeya Rural		Hon. Rev.	Luckson Mwanjale	CCM	39,701	58.66
Mbeya	Mbozi East		Hon.	Godfrey Zambi	CCM	49,095	58.82
Mbeya	Mbozi West		Hon.	David Silinde	CHADEMA	20,835	49.19
Mbeya	Rungwe East		Hon. Prof.	Mark Mwandosya	CCM	Unopposed	–
Mbeya	Rungwe West		Hon. Prof.	David Mwakyusa	CCM	Unopposed	–
Mbeya	Songwe		Hon.	Philipo Mulugo	CCM	Unopposed	–
Morogoro	Gairo		Hon.	Ahmed Shabiby	CCM	25,413	92.81
Morogoro	Kilombero		Hon.	Abdul Mteketa	CCM	43,459	48.86
Morogoro	Kilosa		Hon.	Mustafa Mkulo	CCM	31,004	80.10
Morogoro	Mikumi		Hon.	Abdulsalaam Amer	CCM	22,849	63.30
Morogoro	Morogoro South		Hon.	Innocent Kalogeris	CCM	20,917	75.54
Morogoro	Morogoro South East		Hon. Dr.	Lucy Nkya	CCM	20,324	75.54
Morogoro	Morogoro Urban		Hon.	Abdul-Aziz Abood	CCM	39,066	57.99
Morogoro	Mvomero		Hon.	Amos Makalla	CCM	41,884	67.26
Morogoro	Ulanga East		Hon.	Celina Kombani	CCM	Unopposed	–
Morogoro	Ulanga West		Hon. Dr.	Hadji Mponda	CCM	18,627	52.42
Mtwara	Lulindi		Hon.	Jerome Bwanausi	CCM	24,988	72.00
Mtwara	Masasi		Hon.	Mariam Kasembe	CCM	29,310	63.71
Mtwara	Mtwara Rural		Hon.	Hawa Ghasia	CCM	37,256	66.69
Mtwara	Mtwara Urban		Hon.	Hasnain Murji	CCM	17,004	57.37
Mtwara	Nanyumbu		Hon.	Dunstan Mkapa	CCM	20,324	59.85
Mtwara	Newala		Hon. Ret. Capt.	George Mkuchika	CCM	40,021	64.00
Mtwara	Tandahimba		Hon.	Juma Njwayo	CCM	34,154	48.31
Mwanza	Buchosa		Hon. Dr.	Charles Tizeba	CCM	25,925	51.18
Mwanza	Busanda		Hon.	Lolesia Bukwimba	CCM	32,781	54.21
Mwanza	Busega		Hon.	Titus Kamani	CCM	32,742	80.54
Mwanza	Geita		Hon.	Donald Max	CCM	33,331	54.02
Mwanza	Ilemela		Hon.	Highness Kiwia	CHADEMA	31,296	50.56
Mwanza	Kwimba		Hon.	Shanif Mansoor	CCM	19,503	65.64
Mwanza	Magu Urban		Hon. Dr.	Festus Limbu	CCM	30,160	46.18
Mwanza	Misungwi		Hon.	Charles Kitwanga	CCM	41,935	83.24
Mwanza	Nyamagana		Hon.	Ezekia Wenje	CHADEMA	38,171	56.50
Mwanza	Nyanghwale		Hon.	Hussein Amar	CCM	19,987	82.96
Mwanza	Sengerema		Hon.	William Ngeleja	CCM	Unopposed	–
Mwanza	Sumve		Hon.	Richard Ndassa	CCM	18,705	51.64
Mwanza	Ukerewe		Hon.	Salvatory Machemli	CHADEMA	34,642	55.22
Pemba North	Gando		Hon.	Khalifa Suleiman Khalifa	CUF	4,588	74.50
Pemba North	Kojani		Hon.	Rashid Omar	CUF	5,185	84.43
Pemba North	Konde		Hon.	Khatib Haji	CUF	5,268	82.20
Pemba North	Micheweni		Hon.	Haji Kai	CUF	4,929	67.27
Pemba North	Mgogoni		Hon.	Kombo Khamis Kombo	CUF	5,214	82.53
Pemba North	Mtambwe		Hon.	Said Suleiman Said	CUF	4,849	84.05
Pemba North	Ole		Hon.	Rajab Mohammed	CUF	5,250	78.25
Pemba North	Tumbe		Hon.	Rashid Abdallah	CUF	5,633	83.17
Pemba North	Wete		Hon.	Mbarouk Ali	CUF	4,908	82.71
Pemba South	Chake Chake		Hon.	Haji Mussa	CUF	5,048	70.88
Pemba South	Chambani		Hon.	Salim Khamis	CUF	3,351	76.30
Pemba South	Chonga		Hon.	Haroub Shamis	CUF	3,107	50.80
Pemba South	Kiwani		Hon.	Abdalla Ali	CUF	3,240	56.92
Pemba South	Mkanyageni		Hon. Eng.	Mohamed Mnyaa	CUF	3,151	56.93
Pemba South	Mkoani		Hon.	Ali Khamis Seif	CUF	3,587	58.67
Pemba South	Mtambile		Hon.	Masoud Salim	CUF	4,366	73.71
Pemba South	Wawi		Hon.	Hamad Rashid Mohamed	CUF	5,361	65.39
Pemba South	Ziwani		Hon.	Ahmed Ngwali	CUF	5,147	74.75
Pwani	Bagamoyo		Hon. Dr.	Shukuru Kawambwa	CCM	15,604	74.76
Pwani	Chalinze		Hon.	Saidi Bwanamdogo	CCM	32,924	87.30
Pwani	Kibaha Rural		Hon.	Hamoud Jumaa	CCM	11,361	74.87
Pwani	Kibaha Urban		Hon.	Silvestry Koka	CCM	14,028	54.60
Pwani	Kibiti		Hon.	Abdul Marombwa	CCM	16,008	59.23
Pwani	Kisarawe		Hon.	Selemani Jafo	CCM	19,832	78.15
Pwani	Mafia		Hon.	Abdulkarim Shah	CCM	8,137	52.68
Pwani	Mkuranga		Hon.	Adam Malima	CCM	25,571	67.97
Pwani	Rufiji		Hon. Dr.	Seif Rashidi	CCM	14,476	56.27
Rukwa	Kalambo		Hon.	Sinkamba Kandege	CCM	24,755	79.65
Rukwa	Katavi		Rt. Hon.	Mizengo Pinda	CCM	Unopposed	–
Rukwa	Kwela		Hon.	Ignas Malocha	CCM	29,300	73.94
Rukwa	Mpanda Rural		Hon.	Moshi Kakoso	CCM	5,693	62.3
Rukwa	Mpanda Urban		Hon.	Said Arfi	CHADEMA	8,075	49.62
Rukwa	Nkasi North		Hon.	Ally Keissy	CCM	11,883	51.76
Rukwa	Nkasi South		Hon.	Desderius Mipata	CCM	10,788	54.84
Rukwa	Sumbawanga Urban		Hon.	Aeshi Hilaly	CCM	17,328	48.99
Ruvuma	Mbinga East		Hon.	Gaudence Kayombo	CCM	54,645	88.48
Ruvuma	Mbinga West		Hon. Ret. Capt.	John Komba	CCM	18,969	80.11
Ruvuma	Namtumbo		Hon.	Vita Kawawa	CCM	28,032	73.53
Ruvuma	Peramiho		Hon.	Jenista Mhagama	CCM	28,782	89.43
Ruvuma	Songea Urban		Hon.	Emmanuel Nchimbi	CCM	27,582	59.09
Ruvuma	Tunduru North		Hon. Eng.	Ramo Makani	CCM	19,451	50.48
Ruvuma	Tunduru South		Hon.	Mtutura A. Mtutura	CCM	19,885	62.80
Shinyanga	Bariadi East		Hon.	John Cheyo	UDP	38,254	51.58
Shinyanga	Bariadi West		Hon.	Andrew Chenge	CCM	50,107	30.00
Shinyanga	Bukombe		Hon. Prof.	Kulikoyela Kahigi	CHADEMA	19,035	58.24
Shinyanga	Kahama		Hon.	James Lembeli	CCM	32,531	54.51
Shinyanga	Kisesa		Hon.	Luhaga Mpina	CCM	18,845	59.67
Shinyanga	Kishapu		Hon.	Suleiman M. Suleiman	CCM	32,797	72.50
Shinyanga	Maswa East		Hon.	Sylvester Kasulumbayi	CHADEMA	17,075	46.88
Shinyanga	Maswa West		Hon.	John Shibuda	CHADEMA	17,418	53.19
Shinyanga	Mbogwe		Hon.	Augustino Masele	CCM	18,019	62.07
Shinyanga	Meatu		Hon.	Meshack Opulukwa	CHADEMA	13,876	50.03
Shinyanga	Msalala		Hon.	Ezekiel Maige	CCM	30,715	66.04
Shinyanga	Shinyanga Urban		Hon.	Stephen Masele	CCM	18,903	48.76
Shinyanga	Solwa		Hon.	Ahmed Salum	CCM	37,418	69.93
Singida	Iramba East		Hon.	Salome Mwambu	CCM	25,809	74.56
Singida	Iramba West		Hon.	Mwigulu Nchemba	CCM	33,931	87.64
Singida	Manyoni East		Hon. Ret. Capt.	John Chiligati	CCM	21,494	85.48
Singida	Manyoni West		Hon.	John Lwanji	CCM	7,338	53.00
Singida	Singida East		Hon.	Tundu Lissu	CHADEMA	13,787	50.89
Singida	Singida North		Hon.	Lazaro Nyalandu	CCM	41,102	87.70
Singida	Singida South		Hon.	Mohamed Missanga	CCM	12,904	61.21
Singida	Singida Urban		Hon.	Mohammed Dewji	CCM	21,169	81.06
Tabora	Bukene		Hon.	Selemani Zedi	CCM	17,646	71.85
Tabora	Igalula		Hon. Dr.	Athuman Mfutakamba	CCM	8,971	67.25
Tabora	Igunga		Hon.	Rostam Aziz	CCM	35,674	72.78
Tabora	Nzega		Hon. Dr.	Hamisi Kigwangalla	CCM	20,470	56.66
Tabora	Sikonge		Hon.	Said Nkumba	CCM	12,025	63.80
Tabora	Tabora North		Hon.	Shaffin Sumar	CCM	18,872	81.54
Tabora	Tabora Urban		Hon.	Ismail Rage	CCM	27,329	67.83
Tabora	Urambo East		Hon.	Samuel Sitta	CCM	19,947	70.47
Tabora	Urambo West		Hon. Prof.	Juma Kapuya	CCM	18,691	59.15
Tanga	Bumbuli		Hon.	January Makamba	CCM	Unopposed	–
Tanga	Handeni		Hon. Dr.	Abdallah Kigoda	CCM	31,537	69.98
Tanga	Kilindi		Hon.	Beatrice Shellukindo	CCM	31,077	92.47
Tanga	Korogwe Rural		Hon.	Stephen Ngonyani	CCM	41,377	84.44
Tanga	Korogwe Urban		Hon.	Yusuph Nassir	CCM	12,090	82.07
Tanga	Lushoto		Hon.	Henry Shekifu	CCM	17,783	78.63
Tanga	Mkinga		Hon.	Dunstan Kitandula	CCM	19,667	62.14
Tanga	Mlalo		Hon. Brig. Gen.	Hassan Ngwilizi	CCM	22,956	72.54
Tanga	Muheza		Hon.	Herbert Mntangi	CCM	34,836	75.77
Tanga	Pangani		Hon.	Saleh Pamba	CCM	9,342	60.62
Tanga	Tanga Urban		Hon.	Omari Nundu	CCM	40,225	55.72
Unguja North	Bumbwini		Hon.	Ramadhan Saleh	CCM	3,645	56.24
Unguja North	Chaani		Hon.	Ali Juma Haji	CCM	5,553	76.23
Unguja North	Donge		Hon.	Sadifa Khamis	CCM	6,202	87.05
Unguja North	Kitope		Hon. Amb.	Seif Ali Iddi	CCM	5,033	63.83
Unguja North	Matemwe		Hon.	Kheri Ameir	CCM	2,997	53.34
Unguja North	Mkwajuni		Hon.	Jaddy Simai Jaddy	CCM	3,169	51.79
Unguja North	Nungwi		Hon.	Yussuf Khamis	CUF	3,688	48.23
Unguja North	Tumbatu		Hon.	Juma Ali	CCM	4,659	53.84
Unguja South	Chwaka		Hon.	Yahya Kassim Issa	CCM	6,103	66.16
Unguja South	Koani		Hon.	Amina Clement	CCM	6,920	61.82
Unguja South	Makunduchi		Hon.	Samia Suluhu	CCM	6,141	80.29
Unguja South	Muyuni		Hon.	Mahadhi Maalim	CCM	5,907	80.66
Unguja South	Uzini		Hon. Dr.	Muhammed Seif Khatib	CCM	6,651	81.96
Urban West	Amani		Hon.	Mussa Hassan Mussa	CCM	4,291	65.34
Urban West	Bububu		Hon.	Juma Sururu Juma	CCM	4,410	50.50
Urban West	Chumbuni		Hon.	Pereira Silima	CCM	5,219	59.59
Urban West	Dimani		Hon.	Abdallah Ameir	CCM	6,287	62.60
Urban West	Dole		Hon.	Sylvester Mabumba	CCM	3,871	55.92
Urban West	Fuoni		Hon.	Said Zubeir	CCM	6,224	65.51
Urban West	Jangombe		Hon.	Hussein Mzee	CCM	5,835	71.18
Urban West	Kiembesamaki		Hon.	Waride Jabu	CCM	2,928	70.79
Urban West	Kikwajuni		Hon.	Hamad Masauni	CCM	4,256	68.45
Urban West	Kwahani		Hon. Dr.	Hussein Mwinyi	CCM	5,277	79.93
Urban West	Kwamtipura		Hon.	Kheir Khamis	CCM	6,260	66.42
Urban West	Magogoni		Hon.	Hamad Ali Hamad	CUF	4,033	54.10
Urban West	Magomeni		Hon.	Muhammad Chomboh	CCM	5,394	56.30
Urban West	Mfenesini		Hon.	Suleiman Omar	CCM	3,111	55.03
Urban West	Mji Mkongwe		Hon.	Muhammad Sanya	CUF	4,478	70.76
Urban West	Mpendae		Hon.	Salim Turky	CCM	5,102	60.14
Urban West	Mwanakwerekwe		Hon.	Haji Sereweji	CCM	2,975	58.59
Urban West	Mtoni		Hon.	Haji Faki	CUF	4,097	55.13
Urban West	Rahaleo		Hon.	Abdulla Saadalla	CCM	3,928	61.64

== Changes ==
- 2011: Rostam Aziz (CCM, Igunga) resigned on 13 July 2011 citing his exit from "gutter politics" and his decision to 'concentrate on his business'. On 2 October 2011, Dalaly Kafumu (CCM) won the by-election by 50.45%.
- 2012: Jeremiah Sumari (CCM, Arumeru East) died on 19 January 2012. On 2 April 2012, Joshua Nassari (CHADEMA) won the by-election by 54.92%.
- 2013: Salim Khamis (CUF, Chambani) died on 28 March 2013. On 16 June 2013, Yussuf Salim Hussein (CUF) won the by-election by a landslide (83.6%)
- 2014: William Mgimwa (CCM, Kalenga) died on 1 January 2014 whilst undergoing treatment in South Africa. A by-election took place on 16 March 2014 and his son Godfrey Mgimwa (CCM) won by a landslide (79.27%).
- 2014: Saidi Bwanamdogo (CCM, Chalinze) died on 22 January 2014. A by-election took place on 6 April 2014 and Ridhiwani Kikwete (CCM) won by a landslide (86.44%).
- 2015: John Komba (CCM, Mbinga West) died on 28 February 2015. Prime Minister Mizengo Pinda said that no by-election will be held as per the 1985 Elections Act; due to the short time left before the next election.
- 2015: Zitto Kabwe (Chadema, Kigoma North) was expelled from his party, thus, ending his tenure.
- 2015: Eugen Mwaiposa (CCM, Ukonga) died on 2 June 2015.
- 2015: Donald Max (CCM, Geita) died on 23 June 2015.
