= List of constituencies of Tanzania =

The Parliament of Tanzania is made up of 239 constituencies which elect a Member of Parliament for a five-year term.

== List ==
Constituency representation in Parliament
Political Party	Seats
Chama Cha Mapinduzi	185
Chadema	24
Civic United Front	24
NCCR-Mageuzi	4
Tanzania Labour Party	1
United Democratic Party	1
Total	239

Region	Constituency	Title	Incumbent	Party
Arusha	Arumeru East	Hon.	Joshua Nassari	CHADEMA
Arusha	Arumeru West	Hon.	Goodluck Ole-Medeye	CCM
Arusha	Arusha Urban	Hon.	Godbless Lema	CHADEMA
Arusha	Karatu	Hon. Rev.	Israel Natse	CHADEMA
Arusha	Longido	Hon.	Michael Laizer	CCM
Arusha	Monduli	Hon.	Edward Lowassa	CCM
Arusha	Ngorongoro	Hon.	Kaika Telele	CCM
Dar es Salaam	Ilala	Hon.	Mussa Zungu	CCM
Dar es Salaam	Kawe	Hon.	Halima Mdee	CHADEMA
Dar es Salaam	Kigamboni	Hon. Dr.	Faustine Ndugulile	CCM
Dar es Salaam	Kinondoni	Hon.	Idd Azzan	CCM
Dar es Salaam	Segerea	Hon.	Milton Mahanga	CCM
Dar es Salaam	Temeke	Hon.	Abas Mtemvu	CCM
Dar es Salaam	Ubungo	Hon.	John Mnyika	CHADEMA
Dar es Salaam	Ukonga	Hon.	Eugen Mwaiposa	CCM
Dodoma	Bahi	Hon.	Omary Badwel	CCM
Dodoma	Chilonwa	Hon.	Hezekiah Chibulunje	CCM
Dodoma	Dodoma Urban	Hon.	David Mallole	CCM
Dodoma	Kibakwe	Hon.	George Simbachawene	CCM
Dodoma	Kondoa North	Hon.	Zabein Mhita	CCM
Dodoma	Kondoa South	Hon.	Juma Nkamia	CCM
Dodoma	Kongwa	Hon.	Job Ndugai	CCM
Dodoma	Mpwapwa	Hon.	Gregory Teu	CCM
Dodoma	Mtera	Hon.	Livingstone Lusinde	CCM
Iringa	Iringa Urban	Hon. Rev.	Peter Msigwa	CHADEMA
Iringa	Ismani	Hon.	William Lukuvi	CCM
Iringa	Kalenga	Hon.	Godfrey Mgimwa	CCM
Iringa	Kilolo	Hon. Prof.	Peter Msolla	CCM
Iringa	Ludewa	Hon.	Deo Filikunjombe	CCM
Iringa	Makete	Hon. Dr.	Binilith Mahenge	CCM
Iringa	Mufindi North	Hon.	Mahmoud Mgimwa	CCM
Iringa	Mufindi South	Hon.	Mendrad Kigola	CCM
Iringa	Njombe North	Hon.	Deo Sanga	CCM
Iringa	Njombe South	Hon.	Anne Makinda	CCM
Iringa	Njombe West	Hon. Eng.	Gerson Lwenge	CCM
Kagera	Biharamulo West	Hon.	Antony Mbassa	CHADEMA
Kagera	Bukoba Rural	Hon.	Jason Rweikiza	CCM
Kagera	Bukoba Urban	Hon. Amb.	Khamis Kagasheki	CCM
Kagera	Chato	Hon. Dr.	John Magufuli	CCM
Kagera	Karagwe	Hon.	Gosbert Blandes	CCM
Kagera	Kyerwa	Hon.	Eustace Katagira	CCM
Kagera	Nkenge	Hon.	Assumpter Mshama	CCM
Kagera	Muleba North	Hon.	Charles Mwijage	CCM
Kagera	Muleba South	Hon. Prof.	Anna Tibaijuka	CCM
Kagera	Ngara	Hon.	Deogratias Ntukamazina	CCM
Kigoma	Buyungu	Hon. Eng.	Christopher Chiza	CCM
Kigoma	Kasulu Rural	Hon.	Agripina Buyogera	NCCR–Mageuzi
Kigoma	Kasulu Urban	Hon.	Moses Machali	NCCR–Mageuzi
Kigoma	Kigoma North	Hon.	Zitto Kabwe	CHADEMA
Kigoma	Kigoma South	Hon.	David Kafulila	NCCR–Mageuzi
Kigoma	Kigoma Urban	Hon.	Peter Serukamba	CCM
Kigoma	Manyovu	Hon.	Albert Ntabaliba	CCM
Kigoma	Muhambwe	Hon.	Felix Mkosamali	NCCR–Mageuzi
Kilimanjaro	Hai	Hon.	Freeman Mbowe	CHADEMA
Kilimanjaro	Moshi Rural	Hon. Dr.	Cyril Chami	CCM
Kilimanjaro	Moshi Urban	Hon.	Philemon Ndesamburo	CHADEMA
Kilimanjaro	Mwanga	Hon. Prof.	Jumanne Maghembe	CCM
Kilimanjaro	Rombo	Hon.	Joseph Selasini Shao	CHADEMA
Kilimanjaro	Same East	Hon.	Anne Malecela	CCM
Kilimanjaro	Same West	Hon. Dr.	David Mathayo David	CCM
Kilimanjaro	Siha	Hon.	Aggrey Mwanri	CCM
Kilimanjaro	Vunjo	Hon.	Augustino Mrema	Labour
Lindi	Lindi Urban	Hon.	Salum Barwany	CUF
Lindi	Kilwa North	Hon.	Murtaza Mangungu	CCM
Lindi	Kilwa South	Hon.	Selemani Bungara	CUF
Lindi	Liwale	Hon.	Faith Mitambo	CCM
Lindi	Mchinga	Hon.	Saidi Mtanda	CCM
Lindi	Mtama	Hon.	Bernard Membe	CCM
Lindi	Nachingwea	Hon.	Mathias Chikawe	CCM
Lindi	Ruangwa	Hon.	Majaliwa K. Majaliwa	CCM
Manyara	Babati Rural	Hon.	Jitu Soni	CCM
Manyara	Babati Urban	Hon.	Kisyeri Chambiri	CCM
Manyara	Hanang	Hon.	Mary Nagu	CCM
Manyara	Mbulu	Hon.	Mustapha Akunaay	CHADEMA
Manyara	Kiteto	Hon.	Benedict Ole-Nangoro	CCM
Manyara	Simanjiro	Hon.	Christopher Ole-Sendeka	CCM
Mara	Bunda	Hon.	Stephen Wasira	CCM
Mara	Musoma Rural	Hon.	Nimrod Mkono	CCM
Mara	Musoma Urban	Hon.	Vedastus Mathayo	CCM
Mara	Mwibara	Hon.	Alphaxard Lugola	CCM
Mara	Rorya	Hon.	Lameck Okambo	CCM
Mara	Serengeti	Hon. Dr.	Stephen Kebwe	CCM
Mara	Tarime	Hon.	Nyambari Nyangwine	CCM
Mbeya	Ileje	Hon.	Aliko Kibona	CCM
Mbeya	Kyela	Hon. Dr.	Harrison Mwakyembe	CCM
Mbeya	Lupa	Hon.	Victor Mwambalaswa	CCM
Mbeya	Mbarali	Hon.	Modestus Kilufi	CCM
Mbeya	Mbeya Urban	Hon.	Osmund Mbilinyi	CHADEMA
Mbeya	Mbeya Rural	Hon. Rev.	Luckson Mwanjale	CCM
Mbeya	Mbozi East	Hon.	Godfrey Zambi	CCM
Mbeya	Mbozi West	Hon.	David Silinde	CHADEMA
Mbeya	Rungwe East	Hon. Prof.	Mark Mwandosya	CCM
Mbeya	Rungwe West	Hon. Prof.	David Mwakyusa	CCM
Mbeya	Songwe	Hon.	Philipo Mulugo	CCM
Morogoro	Gairo	Hon.	Ahmed Shabiby	CCM
Morogoro	Kilombero	Hon.	Abdul Mteketa	CCM
Morogoro	Kilosa	Hon.	Mustafa Mkulo	CCM
Morogoro	Mikumi	Hon.	Abdulsalaam Amer	CCM
Morogoro	Morogoro South	Hon.	Innocent Kalogeris	CCM
Morogoro	Morogoro South East	Hon. Dr.	Lucy Nkya	CCM
Morogoro	Morogoro Urban	Hon.	Abdul-Aziz Abood	CCM
Morogoro	Mvomero	Hon.	Amos Makalla	CCM
Morogoro	Ulanga East	Hon.	Celina Kombani	CCM
Morogoro	Ulanga West	Hon. Dr.	Hadji Mponda	CCM
Mtwara	Lulindi	Hon.	Jerome Bwanausi	CCM
Mtwara	Masasi	Hon.	Mariam Kasembe	CCM
Mtwara	Mtwara Rural	Hon.	Hawa Ghasia	CCM
Mtwara	Mtwara Urban	Hon.	Hasnain Murji	CCM
Mtwara	Nanyumbu	Hon.	Dunstan Mkapa	CCM
Mtwara	Newala	Hon. Ret. Capt.	George Mkuchika	CCM
Mtwara	Tandahimba	Hon.	Juma Njwayo	CCM
Mwanza	Buchosa	Hon. Dr.	Charles Tizeba	CCM
Mwanza	Busanda	Hon.	Lolesia Bukwimba	CCM
Mwanza	Busega	Hon.	Titus Kamani	CCM
Mwanza	Geita	Hon.	Donald Max	CCM
Mwanza	Ilemela	Hon.	Highness Kiwia	CHADEMA
Mwanza	Kwimba	Hon.	Shanif Mansoor	CCM
Mwanza	Magu Urban	Hon. Dr.	Festus Limbu	CCM
Mwanza	Misungwi	Hon.	Charles Kitwanga	CCM
Mwanza	Nyamagana	Hon.	Ezekia Wenje	CHADEMA
Mwanza	Nyanghwale	Hon.	Hussein Amar	CCM
Mwanza	Sengerema	Hon.	William Ngeleja	CCM
Mwanza	Sumve	Hon.	Richard Ndassa	CCM
Mwanza	Ukerewe	Hon.	Salvatory Machemli	CHADEMA
Pemba North	Gando	Hon.	Khalifa Suleiman Khalifa	CUF
Pemba North	Kojani	Hon.	Rashid Omar	CUF
Pemba North	Konde	Hon.	Khatib Haji	CUF
Pemba North	Micheweni	Hon.	Haji Kai	CUF
Pemba North	Mgogoni	Hon.	Kombo Khamis Kombo	CUF
Pemba North	Mtambwe	Hon.	Said Suleiman Said	CUF
Pemba North	Ole	Hon.	Rajab Mohammed	CUF
Pemba North	Tumbe	Hon.	Rashid Abdallah	CUF
Pemba North	Wete	Hon.	Mbarouk Ali	CUF
Pemba South	Chake Chake	Hon.	Haji Mussa	CUF
Pemba South	Chambani	Hon.	Yussuf Salim Hussein	CUF
Pemba South	Chonga	Hon.	Haroub Shamis	CUF
Pemba South	Kiwani	Hon.	Abdalla Ali	CUF
Pemba South	Mkanyageni	Hon. Eng.	Mohamed Mnyaa	CUF
Pemba South	Mkoani	Hon.	Ali Khamis Seif	CUF
Pemba South	Mtambile	Hon.	Masoud Salim	CUF
Pemba South	Wawi	Hon.	Hamad Rashid Mohamed	CUF
Pemba South	Ziwani	Hon.	Ahmed Ngwali	CUF
Pwani	Bagamoyo	Hon. Dr.	Shukuru Kawambwa	CCM
Pwani	Chalinze	Hon.	Ridhiwani Kikwete	CCM
Pwani	Kibaha Rural	Hon.	Hamoud Jumaa	CCM
Pwani	Kibaha Urban	Hon.	Silvestry Koka	CCM
Pwani	Kibiti	Hon.	Abdul Marombwa	CCM
Pwani	Kisarawe	Hon.	Selemani Jafo	CCM
Pwani	Mafia	Hon.	Abdulkarim Shah	CCM
Pwani	Mkuranga	Hon.	Adam Malima	CCM
Pwani	Rufiji	Hon. Dr.	Seif Rashidi	CCM
Rukwa	Kalambo	Hon.	Sinkamba Kandege	CCM
Rukwa	Katavi	Rt. Hon.	Mizengo Pinda	CCM
Rukwa	Kwela	Hon.	Ignas Malocha	CCM
Rukwa	Mpanda Rural	Hon.	Moshi Kakoso	CCM
Rukwa	Mpanda Urban	Hon.	Said Arfi	CHADEMA
Rukwa	Nkasi North	Hon.	Ally Keissy	CCM
Rukwa	Nkasi South	Hon.	Desderius Mipata	CCM
Rukwa	Sumbawanga Urban	Hon.	Aeshi Hilaly	CCM
Ruvuma	Mbinga East	Hon.	Gaudence Kayombo	CCM
Ruvuma	Mbinga West	Hon. Capt.	John Komba	CCM
Ruvuma	Namtumbo	Hon.	Vita Kawawa	CCM
Ruvuma	Peramiho	Hon.	Jenista Mhagama	CCM
Ruvuma	Songea Urban	Hon.	Emmanuel Nchimbi	CCM
Ruvuma	Tunduru North	Hon. Eng.	Ramo Makani	CCM
Ruvuma	Tunduru South	Hon.	Mtutura A. Mtutura	CCM
Shinyanga	Bariadi East	Hon.	John Cheyo	UDP
Shinyanga	Bariadi West	Hon.	Andrew Chenge	CCM
Shinyanga	Bukombe	Hon. Prof.	Kulikoyela Kahigi	CHADEMA
Shinyanga	Kahama	Hon.	James Lembeli	CCM
Shinyanga	Kisesa	Hon.	Luhaga Mpina	CCM
Shinyanga	Kishapu	Hon.	Suleiman M. Suleiman	CCM
Shinyanga	Maswa East	Hon.	Sylvester Kasulumbayi	CHADEMA
Shinyanga	Maswa West	Hon.	John Shibuda	CHADEMA
Shinyanga	Mbogwe	Hon.	Augustino Masele	CCM
Shinyanga	Meatu	Hon.	Meshack Opulukwa	CHADEMA
Shinyanga	Msalala	Hon.	Ezekiel Maige	CCM
Shinyanga	Shinyanga Urban	Hon.	Stephen Masele	CCM
Shinyanga	Solwa	Hon.	Ahmed Salum	CCM
Singida	Iramba East	Hon.	Salome Mwambu	CCM
Singida	Iramba West	Hon.	Mwigulu Nchemba	CCM
Singida	Manyoni East	Hon. Capt.	John Chiligati	CCM
Singida	Manyoni West	Hon.	John Lwanji	CCM
Singida	Singida East	Hon.	Tundu Lissu	CHADEMA
Singida	Singida North	Hon.	Lazaro Nyalandu	CCM
Singida	Singida South	Hon.	Mohamed Missanga	CCM
Singida	Singida Urban	Hon.	Mohammed Dewji	CCM
Tabora	Bukene	Hon.	Selemani Zedi	CCM
Tabora	Igalula	Hon.	Athuman Mfutakamba	CCM
Tabora	Igunga	Hon. Dr.	Dalaly Kafumu	CCM
Tabora	Nzega	Hon. Dr.	Hamisi Kigwangalla	CCM
Tabora	Sikonge	Hon.	Said Nkumba	CCM
Tabora	Tabora North	Hon.	Shaffin Sumar	CCM
Tabora	Tabora Urban	Hon.	Ismail Rage	CCM
Tabora	Urambo East	Hon.	Samuel Sitta	CCM
Tabora	Urambo West	Hon. Prof.	Juma Kapuya	CCM
Tanga	Bumbuli	Hon.	January Makamba	CCM
Tanga	Handeni	Hon. Dr.	Abdallah Kigoda	CCM
Tanga	Kilindi	Hon.	Beatrice Shellukindo	CCM
Tanga	Korogwe Rural	Hon.	Stephen Ngonyani	CCM
Tanga	Korogwe Urban	Hon.	Yusuph Nassir	CCM
Tanga	Lushoto	Hon.	Henry Shekifu	CCM
Tanga	Mkinga	Hon.	Dunstan Kitandula	CCM
Tanga	Mlalo	Hon. Brig. Gen.	Hassan Ngwilizi	CCM
Tanga	Muheza	Hon.	Herbert Mntangi	CCM
Tanga	Pangani	Hon.	Saleh Pamba	CCM
Tanga	Tanga Urban	Hon.	Omari Nundu	CCM
Unguja North	Bumbwini	Hon.	Ramadhan Saleh	CCM
Unguja North	Chaani	Hon.	Ali Juma Haji	CCM
Unguja North	Donge	Hon.	Sadifa Khamis	CCM
Unguja North	Kitope	Hon. Amb.	Seif Ali Iddi	CCM
Unguja North	Matemwe	Hon.	Kheri Ameir	CCM
Unguja North	Mkwajuni	Hon.	Jaddy Simai Jaddy	CCM
Unguja North	Nungwi	Hon.	Yussuf Khamis	CUF
Unguja North	Tumbatu	Hon.	Juma Ali	CCM
Unguja South	Chwaka	Hon.	Yahya Kassim Issa	CCM
Unguja South	Koani	Hon.	Amina Clement	CCM
Unguja South	Makunduchi	Hon.	Samia Suluhu	CCM
Unguja South	Muyuni	Hon.	Mahadhi Maalim	CCM
Unguja South	Uzini	Hon. Dr.	Muhammed Seif Khatib	CCM
Urban West	Amani	Hon.	Mussa Hassan Mussa	CCM
Urban West	Bububu	Hon.	Juma Sururu Juma	CCM
Urban West	Chumbuni	Hon.	Pereira Silima	CCM
Urban West	Dimani	Hon.	Abdallah Ameir	CCM
Urban West	Dole	Hon.	Sylvester Mabumba	CCM
Urban West	Fuoni	Hon.	Said Zubeir	CCM
Urban West	Jangombe	Hon.	Hussein Mzee	CCM
Urban West	Kiembesamaki	Hon.	Waride Jabu	CCM
Urban West	Kikwajuni	Hon.	Hamad Masauni	CCM
Urban West	Kwahani	Hon. Dr.	Hussein Mwinyi	CCM
Urban West	Kwamtipura	Hon.	Kheir Khamis	CCM
Urban West	Magogoni	Hon.	Hamad Ali Hamad	CUF
Urban West	Magomeni	Hon.	Muhammad Chomboh	CCM
Urban West	Mfenesini	Hon.	Suleiman Omar	CCM
Urban West	Mji Mkongwe	Hon.	Muhammad Sanya	CUF
Urban West	Mpendae	Hon.	Salim Turky	CCM
Urban West	Mwanakwerekwe	Hon.	Haji Sereweji	CCM
Urban West	Mtoni	Hon.	Haji Faki	CUF
Urban West	Rahaleo	Hon.	Abdulla Saadalla	CCM
