= Zubeir =

Zubeir is both a given name and a surname. Notable people with the surname include:

- Zubeir Ahmed El-Sharif (born 1934), Libyan politician
- Zubeir Ali Maulid (born 1968), Tanzanian politician
- Said Zubeir (born 1969), Tanzanian politician
- Shaima Zubeir, Iraqi television presenter

== See also ==
- Gabriel Zubeir Wako (born 1941), South Sudanese cardinal
