= Nyerere (disambiguation) =

Julius Nyerere (1922–1999) was a Tanzanian anti-colonial activist, politician, and political theorist.

Nyerere may also refer to:

- MV Nyerere, a Tanzanian ferry that capsized in 2018

== People with the surname ==
- Makongoro Nyerere (born 1959), Tanzanian politician
- Maria Nyerere (born 1930), First Lady of Tanzania from 1964 to 1985
- Rosemary Nyerere (1961–2021), Tanzanian politician and academic
- Vincent Nyerere (born 1974), Tanzanian politician
