= Lameck =

Lameck is a male given name of Hebrew origin that may refer to:

== Given Name ==
- Lameck Aguta (born 1971), Kenyan marathon runner
- Lameck Bonjisi (1973–2004), Zimbabwean sculptor
- Lameck Chibombamilimo, Zambian politician
- Lameck Okambo (born 1966), Tanzanian politician
- Lameck Onyango (born 1973), Kenyan cricketer

== Surname ==
- Lucy Lameck (1934–1992), Tanzanian politician
- Michael Lameck (born 1949), German footballer
