= Ismail Rage =

Tanzanian politician (born 1953)

Honourable Ismail Rage MP

Member of Parliament for Tabora Town
- Incumbent
- Assumed office November 2010
- Preceded by: Siraju Kaboyonga

Personal details
- Born: 3 January 1953 (age 73) Tanganyika
- Party: CCM
- Education: CBE (Cert)

Ismail Aden Rage (born 3 January 1953) was a Tanzanian CCM politician and Member of Parliament for Bukene constituency from 2010-2020.
