= Dunstan Mkapa =

Tanzanian politician

Honourable Dunstan Mkapa MP

Member of Parliament for Nanyumbu
- Incumbent
- Assumed office December 2005
- Preceded by: Uledi Aridi

Personal details
- Born: 20 September 1948 (age 78) Tanganyika
- Party: CCM
- Education: College of Business Education (Dip)

Dunstan Daniel Mkapa (born 20 September 1948) has been a Tanzanian CCM politician and Member of Parliament for Nanyumbu constituency since 2005.
