= Chaani, Tanzania =

Village in Tanzania

Coordinates: 5.9300°S 39.2550°E

Chaani is a Tanzanian village, located in the northern part of Unguja, the main island of the Zanzibar Archipelago. It belongs to the Zanzibar North Region.
