= Richard Ndassa =

Tanzanian politician (1959–2020)

Honourable Richard Ndassa MP

Member of Parliament for Sumve
- In office November 1995 – April 2020
- Succeeded by: Emmanuel Mageni Kasalali

Personal details
- Born: 21 March 1959 Tanganyika
- Died: 29 April 2020 (aged 61) Dodoma
- Resting place: Kwimba District
- Party: CCM
- Education: Tanzania School of Journalism (Cert); College of Business Education (Dip)

Richard Mganga Ndassa (21 March 1959 – 29 April 2020) was a Tanzanian CCM politician and Member of Parliament for Sumve constituency from 2010 until his death in 2020 from COVID-19.
