= Selemani Zedi =

Tanzanian politician

Honourable Selemani Zedi MP

Member of Parliament for Bukene
- Incumbent
- Assumed office November 2010
- Preceded by: Teddy Kasella-Bantu

Personal details
- Born: 28 October 1965 (age 60)
- Party: CCM
- Education: University of Dar es Salaam
- Position(s): Sales Manager, Zain TZ

Selemani Jumanne Zedi (born 28 October 1965) is a Tanzanian CCM politician and Member of Parliament for Bukene constituency since 2010.
