= Ali Juma Haji =

Tanzanian politician

Honourable Ali Juma Haji MP

Member of Parliament for Chaani
- Incumbent
- Assumed office November 2010

Personal details
- Party: CCM

Ali Juma Haji is a Tanzanian CCM politician and Member of Parliament for Chaani constituency since 2000.
