= Mtutura A. Mtutura =

Tanzanian politician

Honourable Mtutura A. Mtutura MP

Member of Parliament for Tunduru South
- In office December 2005 – 2010
- Preceded by: Juma Jamaldin Akukweti
- Succeeded by: Daimu Idd Mpakate

Personal details
- Born: 6 May 1961 (age 65) Tanganyika
- Party: [Alliance for Change and Transparency (ACT-Wazalendo)]
- Education: CBE (PGDip)

Mtutura Abdallah Mtutura (born 6 May 1961) is a Tanzanian CCM politician and member of parliament for Tunduru South constituency since 2005.
