= Haroub Shamis =

Tanzanian politician

Honourable Haroub Shamis MP

Member of Parliament for Chonga
- Incumbent
- Assumed office November 2010
- Preceded by: Hemed Mohammed Hemed

Personal details
- Born: 5 March 1962 (age 64) Sultanate of Zanzibar
- Party: CUF
- Education: College of Business Education

Haroub Mohamed Shamis (born 5 March 1962) is a Tanzanian CUF politician and Member of Parliament for Chonga constituency since 2010.
