= John Komba =

Tanzanian Member of Parliament

Hon. Ret. Captain John Komba MP

Member of Parliament for Mbinga West
- In office December 2005 – 28 February 2015
- Preceded by: Thadeus Luoga

Personal details
- Born: 18 March 1954 Lituhi, Nyasa District, Ruvuma Region, Tanganyika Territory
- Died: 28 February 2015 (aged 60) Dar es Salaam, Tanzania
- Resting place: Lituhi, Nyasa District
- Party: CCM
- Spouse: Salome
- Children: 11
- Education: Kleruu TTC; Tanzania Military Academy
- Profession: Teacher

Military service
- Allegiance: United Rep. of Tanzania
- Branch/service: Tanzanian Army
- Years of service: 1978–1992
- Rank: Captain

John Damiano Komba (18 March 1954 – 28 February 2015) was a Tanzanian CCM politician and a retired officer of the Tanzanian army. He served as the Member of Parliament for Mbinga West constituency from 2005 until his death.
