= Hassan Ngwilizi =

Tanzanian politician

Honourable Brig. Gen. Hassan Ngwilizi MP

Member of Parliament for Mlalo
- In office December 2005 – August 2010
- Preceded by: Charles Kagonji
- Succeeded by: Rashid Shangazi

Personal details
- Born: Hassan Athumani Ngwilizi; 1 April 1944 Tanganyika Territory
- Died: 20 May 2019 (aged 75) Lugalo Military hospital, Dar es salaam, Tanzania
- Party: CCM
- Spouse: Helen Ngwilizi
- Children: Alifa Hassan Ngwilizi, Gao Ngwilizi, Joanna Ngwilizi, Macky Ngwilizi, Kay Kiyao Ngwilizi
- Education: NDC (India) (MSc)

Military service
- Allegiance: United Rep. of Tanzania
- Branch/service: Tanzanian Army
- Years of service: 1968–1993
- Rank: Brigadier general

Hassan Athumani Ngwilizi (born 1 April 1944- 20 May 2019) was a Tanzanian CCM politician and member of Parliament for Mlalo constituency.
