= Mbarouk Ali =

Tanzanian politician

Honourable Mbarouk Ali MP

Member of Parliament for Wete
- In office November 2010 – August 2015
- Preceded by: Mwadini Jecha

Personal details
- Born: 20 June 1962 (age 64) Sultanate of Zanzibar
- Party: Alliance for Change and Transparency
- Education: SUA (BSc)

Mbarouk Said Ali (born 20 June 1962) is a Tanzanian ACT Wazalendo politician and Member of Parliament for Wete constituency since 2010.
