= Peter Msigwa =

Tanzanian politician

Honourable Rev. Peter Msigwa MP

Member of Parliament for Iringa Town Constituency
- Incumbent
- Assumed office November 2010
- Preceded by: Monica Mbega

Personal details
- Born: 8 June 1965 (age 61)
- Party: CCM
- Education: All Africa Bible College, South Africa

Peter Simon Msigwa (born 8 June 1965) is a Tanzanian politician and Member of Parliament for Iringa Town constituency for two consecutive terms since 2010. Although he was formerly a member of CHADEMA, he joined the ruling party CCM in June 2024.
