= Abdallah Ameir =

Tanzanian politician

Honourable Abdallah Ameir MP

Member of Parliament for Dimani
- Incumbent
- Assumed office November 2010

Personal details
- Born: 3 February 1963 (age 63)
- Party: CCM

Abdallah Sharia Ameir (born 3 February 1963) is a Tanzanian CCM politician and Member of Parliament for Dimani constituency since 2010.
