= Deo Filikunjombe =

Tanzanian politician

Honourable Deo Filikunjombe MP

Member of Parliament for Ludewa
- In office November 2010 – 2015
- Preceded by: Raphael Mwalyosi

Personal details
- Born: 4 March 1972
- Died: 15 October 2015 (aged 43) Selous Game Reserve
- Party: CCM
- Children: Three
- Education: Makerere University (BA)

Deo Haule Filikunjombe (4 March 1972 – 15 October 2015) was a Tanzanian CCM politician and Member of Parliament for Ludewa constituency from 2010 to 2015.

He died on 15 October 2015 in a helicopter crash.
