= Joseph Selasini Shao =

Tanzanian politician

Honourable Joseph Selasini Shao MP

Member of Parliament for Rombo
- In office November 2010 – November 2020
- Preceded by: Basil Mramba
- Succeeded by: Adolf Mkenda

Personal details
- Born: 6 April 1961 (age 65) Tanganyika
- Party: NCCR-Mageuzi
- Other political affiliations: CHADEMA (until 2020)
- Education: Mkuu Extended Primary School; Kaengesa Seminary; Itaga Seminary; Kibosho Seminary; Segerea Seminary; University of Dar es Salaam

Joseph Roman Selasini Shao (born 6 April 1961) is a Tanzanian NCCR-Mageuzi politician and Member of Parliament for Rombo constituency from 2010 to 2020.
