= Athuman Mfutakamba =

Tanzanian politician

Honourable Dr Athuman Mfutakamba MP

Member of Parliament for Igalula
- Incumbent
- Assumed office November 2010
- Preceded by: Tatu Ntimizi

Personal details
- Born: 19 April 1952 (age 74) Tanganyika
- Party: CCM
- Education: University of Dar es Salaam; Stanford University (MSc); University of Ottawa (PhD)

Athuman Rashid Mfutakamba (born 19 April 1952) is a Tanzanian politician affiliated with the Chama Cha Mapinduz political party and Member of Parliament for Igalula constituency since 2010.
