= Abdul Mteketa =

Tanzanian politician

Honourable Abdul Mteketa MP

Member of Parliament for Kilombero
- Incumbent
- Assumed office November 2010
- Preceded by: Castor Ligallama

Personal details
- Born: 1 January 1951 (age 75) Tanganyika
- Party: CCM

Abdul Rajab Mteketa (born 1 January 1951) is a Tanzanian CCM politician and Member of Parliament for Kilombero constituency since 2010.
