= Suleiman M. Suleiman =

Tanzanian politician

Honourable Suleiman M. Suleiman MP

Member of Parliament for Kishapu
- In office November 2010 – 2020
- Preceded by: Fred Tungu
- Succeeded by: Boniface Butondo

Personal details
- Born: 23 April 1979 (age 46)
- Party: CCM

Suleiman Masoud Nchambi Suleiman (born 23 April 1979) is a Tanzanian CCM politician and Member of Parliament for Kishapu constituency since 2010.
