= Haji Kai =

Tanzanian politician

Honourable Haji Kai MP

Member of Parliament for Micheweni
- In office November 2010 – August 2020
- Preceded by: Shoka Juma

Personal details
- Born: 10 October 1971 (age 54) Zanzibar
- Party: ACT Wazalendo

Haji Khatib Kai (born 10 October 1971) is a Tanzanian ACT Wazalendo politician and Member of Parliament for Micheweni constituency since 2010 to 2020.
