= Victor Mwambalaswa =

Tanzanian politician

Honourable Victor Mwambalaswa MP

Member of Parliament for Lupa
- Incumbent
- Assumed office December 2005
- Preceded by: Njelu Kasaka

Personal details
- Born: 8 November 1952 (age 73) Tanganyika
- Party: CCM
- Education: University of Dar es Salaam

Victor Kilasile Mwambalaswa (born 8 November 1952) is a Tanzanian CCM politician and Member of Parliament for Lupa constituency since 2005.
