= Sylvester Mabumba =

Tanzanian politician

Honourable Sylvester Mabumba MP

Member of Parliament for Dole
- Incumbent
- Assumed office November 2010

Personal details
- Born: 10 May 1965 (age 61)
- Party: CCM
- Education: IDM; SNHU

Sylvester Massele Mabumba (born 10 May 1965) is a Tanzanian CCM politician and Member of Parliament for Dole constituency since 2010.
