= Rashid Abdallah =

Tanzanian politician

Honourable Rashid Abdallah MP

Member of Parliament for Tumbe
- Incumbent
- Assumed office November 2010
- Preceded by: Salim Khalfan

Personal details
- Born: 2 December 1959 (age 66) Sultanate of Zanzibar
- Party: CUF
- Education: Howord University

Rashid Ali Abdallah (born 2 December 1959) is a Tanzanian CUF politician and Member of Parliament for Tumbe constituency since 2010.
