= Stephen Masele =

Tanzanian politician (born 1979)

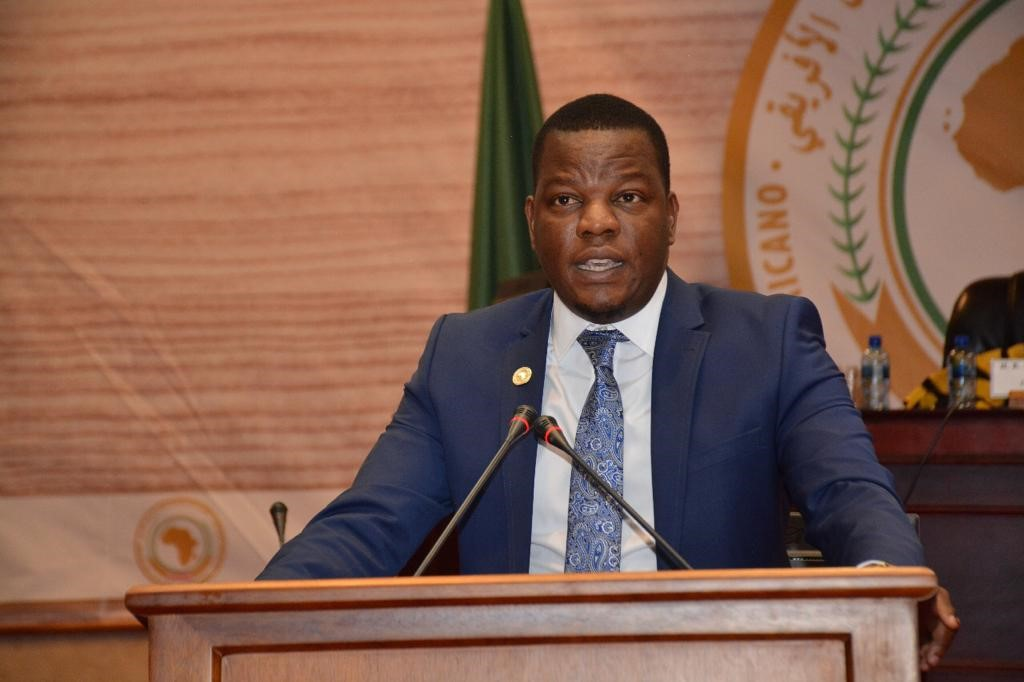

1st Vice President of the Pan-African Parliament
- In office May 2018 – 2021

Member of Parliament for Shinyanga Town
- In office November 2010 – November 2020
- Preceded by: Dr. Charles Ogessa Mlingwa
- Succeeded by: Patrobas Katambi

Personal details
- Born: 1 October 1979 (age 47)
- Party: CCM
- Education: Mwenge Secondary School; Florida International University; Harvard University; Lund University; University of Dar Es Salaam; Morogoro TTC (Cert); University of Dar es Salaam
- Position(s): CRO, Stanbic Bank TZ

Stephen Julius Masele (MP) (born October 1, 1979) is a Tanzanian Diplomat, Member of Parliament, global young politician and a former Investment Banker.

He served as the First Vice President of the Pan-African Parliament (PAP), an organ of the African Union based in South Africa, from May 2018 to 2021. Elected in May 2018, he oversees Administration and Human Resources of the Continental Body among others. He also presides over the Pan-African Parliamentary Alliance on Food Security and Nutrition (PAP-FSN), a joint PAP-FAO project for Africa. He has been a member of the Pan-African Parliament since 2010.

== Background ==
He is a former member of the Inter-Parliamentary Union (IPU) based in Geneva, Switzerland and previously served as Deputy Minister of State in the Vice-President's Office as well as Deputy Minister of Energy and Minerals between 2012 and 2015. Masele spent a number of years working in the private sector in Tanzania including spells with Standard Chartered Bank, Stanbic Bank and Tigo Telecoms Company. He is regarded to have extensive experience in Business, Public Office, African politics, International Affairs and Corporate Affairs.

== Education ==
A Fellow of the Mandela Washington Fellowship for the Young African Leaders since 2014, Masele has attended several post-graduate programs at Harvard University, Kennedy School of Government (2012), Florida International University (FIU) in USA, School of Public Management (2014). He graduated with a Master of Science in Entrepreneurship from the Lund University School of Economics in Sweden as well as a B.A in Political Science and Public Administration at the University of Dar es Salaam in Tanzania.
