= Abbas Zuberi Mtemvu =

Tanzanian politician

Honourable Abbas Mtemvu MP

Member of Parliament for Temeke
- In office December 2005 – November 2010
- Preceded by: Hadija Kusaga

Nzega District Commissioner
- In office 2003–2005
- President: Benjamin Mkapa

Kibaha District Commissioner
- In office 2000–2003
- President: Benjamin Mkapa

Personal details
- Born: 1 November 1959 (age 66) Tanganyika
- Party: CCM
- Education: Kibasila Primary School; Kibohehe Secondary School; University of Dar-es-Salaam

Abbas Zuberi Mtemvu (born 1 November 1959) is a Tanzanian CCM politician and Member of Parliament for Temeke constituency and Dar-es-Salaam Chama Cha Mapinduzi Chairman.
