= Felix Mkosamali =

Tanzanian politician

Honourable Felix Mkosamali MP

Member of Parliament for Muhambwe
- Incumbent
- Assumed office November 2010
- Preceded by: Felix Kijiko

Personal details
- Born: 4 June 1986 (age 39)
- Party: NCCR–Mageuzi

Felix Francis Mkosamali (born 4 June 1986) is a Tanzanian NCCR–Mageuzi politician and Member of Parliament for Muhambwe constituency since 2010.
