= Khalifa Suleiman Khalifa =

Tanzanian politician

Honourable Khalifa Suleiman Khalifa MP

Member of Parliament for Gando
- Incumbent
- Assumed office November 1995

Personal details
- Born: 9 August 1956 (age 70) Sultanate of Zanzibar
- Party: CUF
- Education: University of Exeter (BA)

Khalifa Suleiman Khalifa (born 9 August 1956) is a Tanzanian CUF politician and Member of Parliament for Gando constituency since 1995.
