= Mariam Kasembe =

Tanzanian politician (born 1957)

Honourable Mariam Kasembe MP

Member of Parliament for Masasi
- Incumbent
- Assumed office November 2010
- Preceded by: Raynald Mrope

Member of Parliament
- In office December 2005 – July 2010
- Constituency: None (Special Seat)

Personal details
- Born: 26 August 1957 (age 69) Masasi District, Mtwara Region, Tanganyika Territory
- Party: CCM
- Education: Institute of Adult Education

Mariam Reuben Kasembe (born 26 August 1957) is a Tanzanian CCM politician and Member of Parliament for Masasi constituency since 2010.
