= Augustino Masele =

Tanzanian politician

Honourable Augustino Masele MP

Member of Parliament for Mbogwe
- Incumbent
- Assumed office November 2010

Personal details
- Born: 15 June 1966 (age 60)
- Party: CCM
- Education: Osmania University (BCom); Open University of TZ (LL.B)

Augustino Manyanda Masele (born 15 June 1966) is a Tanzanian CCM politician and Member of Parliament for the Mbogwe constituency since 2010.
