= Goodluck Ole-Medeye =

Tanzanian politician (born 1958)

Honourable Goodluck Ole-Medeye MP

Deputy Minister of Lands, Housing and Human Settlements
- In office 28 November 2010 – 20 January 2014
- Minister: Anna Tibaijuka
- Succeeded by: George Simbachawene

Member of Parliament for Arumeru West
- In office November 2010 – 2015
- Preceded by: Elisa Mollel
- Succeeded by: Gibson Ole Meiseyeki

Personal details
- Born: 14 March 1958 (age 68) Tanganyika
- Party: CCM
- Other political affiliations: CCM
- Spouse: Antonia Lekule
- Education: University of Dar es Salaam; University of Essex (MBA); Aston University (MA)

Goodluck Joseph Ole-Medeye (born 14 March 1958) is a Tanzanian CCM politician and Member of Parliament for Arumeru West constituency since 2010. He served as the Deputy Minister of Lands, Housing and Human Settlements.
