= Vincent Nyerere =

Tanzanian politician

Honourable Vincent Nyerere MP

Member of Parliament for Musoma Town
- Incumbent
- Assumed office November 2010
- Preceded by: Vedastusi Manyinyi

Personal details
- Born: 18 October 1974 (age 51)
- Party: CHADEMA

Vincent Josephat Kiboko Nyerere (born 18 October 1974) is a Tanzanian CHADEMA politician and Member of Parliament for Musoma Town constituency since 2010.
