= Hussein Amar =

Tanzanian politician

Honourable Hussein Amar MP

Member of Parliament for Nyanghwale
- Incumbent
- Assumed office November 2010
- Preceded by: James Musalika

Personal details
- Born: 20 April 1958 (age 67) Tanganyika
- Party: CCM

Hussein Nassor Amar (born 20 April 1958) is a Tanzanian CCM politician and Member of Parliament for Nyanghwale constituency since 2010. Politically, he was active in the Revolutionary Party. In the 2015 Tanzanian general election, he was elected as a member of the National Assembly of Tanzania for a constituency, and during (October 29, 2015) he joined the parliamentary bloc, the Revolution Party.
