= Deogratias Ntukamazina =

Tanzanian politician

Honourable Deogratias Ntukamazina MP

Member of Parliament for Ngara
- Incumbent
- Assumed office November 2010
- Preceded by: Feethan Banyikwa

Personal details
- Party: CCM

Deogratias Aloyce Ntukamazina is a Tanzanian CCM politician and Member of Parliament for Ngara constituency since 2010.
