= Ezekia Wenje =

Tanzanian politician

Honourable Ezekia Wenje MP

Member of Parliament for Nyamagana
- In office November 2010 – November 2015
- Preceded by: Lawrence Masha

Personal details
- Born: 2 October 1978 (age 48) Mara, Tanzania
- Party: CHADEMA
- Spouse: Flora Mushi
- Children: Vanessa Wenje, Hope Wenje, and Patrice Wenje
- Education: Butimba TTC (Dip); St. Augustine TZ (BBA)
- Profession: Teacher

Ezekia Dibogo Wenje (born 2 October 1978) is a Tanzanian politician and part of the CHADEMA center-right political party in Tanzania and Member of Parliament for Nyamagana constituency since 2010.
