= Jerome Bwanausi =

Tanzanian politician

Honourable Jerome Bwanausi MP

Member of Parliament for Lulindi
- Incumbent
- Assumed office November 2010
- Preceded by: Suleiman Kumchaya

Personal details
- Born: 1 November 1959 (age 66) Tanganyika
- Party: CCM

Military service
- Allegiance: United Republic of Tanzania
- Years of service: 1982–1983
- National Service: Oljoro Military Camp, Arusha

Jerome Dismas Bwanausi (born 1 November 1959) is a Tanzanian CCM politician and Member of Parliament for Lulindi constituency since 2010.
