= Kisyeri Chambiri =

Tanzanian politician

Honourable Kisyeri Chambiri MP

Member of Parliament for Babati Town
- Incumbent
- Assumed office November 2010

Personal details
- Born: 1 January 1954 (age 72) Tanganyika
- Party: CCM
- Education: University of Lagos (BSc), (MSc)

Kisyeri Werema Chambiri (born 1 January 1954) is a Tanzanian CCM politician and Member of Parliament for Babati Town constituency since 2010.
