= Dunstan Kitandula =

Tanzanian politician

Honourable Dunstan Kitandula MP

Member of Parliament for Mkinga
- Incumbent
- Assumed office November 2010
- Preceded by: Mbaruk Mwandoro

Personal details
- Born: 1967 (age 58–59) Tanga Region, Tanzania
- Party: CCM
- Education: University of Sunderland (MA)

Dunstan Luka Kitandula (born 1967) is a Tanzanian politician and a member of the political party CCM who was elected as the Member of Parliament for Mkinga from 2010 to 2025. He has been the Chairperson of the Parliamentary Committee on Energy and Minerals, the Vice-Chairperson of the Committee on Finance and Economy, and was a Deputy Minister for Natural Resources and Tourism.
