= Hamoud Jumaa =

Tanzanian politician

Honourable Hamoud Jumaa MP

Member of Parliament for Kibaha Rural
- Incumbent
- Assumed office November 2010
- Preceded by: Ibrahim Msabaha

Personal details
- Born: 10 July 1970 (age 55)
- Party: CCM

Hamoud Abuu Jumaa (born 10 July 1970) is a Tanzanian CCM politician and Member of Parliament for Kibaha Rural constituency since 2010.
