= Philipo Mulugo =

Tanzanian politician (born 1972)

Honourable Philipo Mulugo MP

Deputy Minister of Education and Vocational Training
- In office 28 November 2010 – 20 January 2014
- Minister: Shukuru Kawambwa
- Succeeded by: Jenista Mhagama

Member of Parliament for Songwe
- Incumbent
- Assumed office November 2O1O
- Preceded by: Guido Sigonda

Personal details
- Born: 27 January 1972 (age 54)

Philipo Augustino Mulugo (born 27 January 1972) is a Tanzanian CCM politician and Member of Parliament for Songwe constituency since 2010. He was once served as the Deputy Minister of Education and Vocational Training.
