= Murtaza Mangungu =

Tanzanian politician

Honourable Murtaza Mangungu MP

Member of Parliament for Kilwa North
- Incumbent
- Assumed office November 2010
- Preceded by: Samson Mpanda

Personal details
- Party: CCM

Murtaza Ally Mangungu (born 29 September 1969) is a Tanzanian CCM politician and Member of Parliament for Kilwa North constituency since 2010. Since 2021, he has been chairman of Simba Sports Club in Tanzania.
