= David Kafulila =

Tanzanian politician

Honorable David Kafulila MP

Member of Parliament for Kigoma South
- In office November 2010 – November 2015
- Preceded by: Manju Msambya

Personal details
- Born: 15 February 1982 (age 44)
- Party: NCCR–Mageuzi
- Other political affiliations: CCM
- Spouse: Jesca Kishoa (divorced)
- Education: University of Dar es Salaam - BA; Mzumbe University - ( MBA- CM)

David Zacharia Kafulila (born 15 February 1982) is a Tanzanian Civil Servant and politician.

He was a Regional Commissioner for Simiyu Region after serving as Regional Administrative Secretary for Songwe Region from 2018 to 2020. Currently he is the Commissioner for Public Private Partnership services in the Ministry of Finance and Management.

He was the NCCR–Mageuzi, and shifted to ruling party Chama cha Mapinduzi since 2017. He has been a politician and Member of Parliament for Kigoma South constituency since 2010 to 2015. He's the first Member of Parliament to get a whistle-blower award he received such prize in the year 2015 after exposing and champion the Tegeta Escrow scandal which cost the nation loss of about $200 million USD.
