= Zabein Mhita =

Tanzanian politician

Honourable Zabein Mhita MP

Member of Parliament for Kondoa North
- Incumbent
- Assumed office December 2005
- Preceded by: Khalid Suru

Personal details
- Born: 9 September 1950 (age 76) Tanganyika
- Party: CCM
- Education: University of Dar es Salaam

Zabein Muhaji Mhita (born 9 September 1950) is a Tanzanian CCM politician and Member of Parliament for Kondoa North constituency since 2005.
