= Kheri Ameir =

Tanzanian politician

Honourable Kheri Ameir MP

Member of Parliament for Matemwe
- Incumbent
- Assumed office November 2000

Personal details
- Born: 10 February 1950 (age 76) Sultanate of Zanzibar
- Party: CCM
- Education: Fuoni Primary School; Karume Technical School; Mbweni Technical School; Zanzibar Institute of Finance and Administration

Kheri Khatib Ameir (born 10 February 1950) is a Tanzanian CCM politician and Member of Parliament for Matemwe constituency since 2000.
