= Said Nkumba =

Tanzanian politician

Honourable Said Nkumba MP

Member of Parliament for Sikonge
- Incumbent
- Assumed office November 2000

Personal details
- Born: 17 April 1962 (age 64) Tanganyika
- Party: CCM
- Education: Bunda TTC
- Profession: Teacher

Said Juma Nkumba (born 17 April 1962) was a Tanzanian CCM politician and Member of Parliament for Sikonge constituency, starting term in 2000.
