= Gaudence Kayombo =

Tanzanian politician

Honourable Gaudence Kayombo MP

Member of Parliament for Mbinga East
- Incumbent
- Assumed office December 2005
- Preceded by: Ireneus Ngwatura

Personal details
- Born: 25 July 1955 (age 71) Tanganyika
- Party: CCM
- Education: University of Dar es Salaam

Gaudence Cassian Kayombo (born 25 July 1955) is a Tanzanian CCM politician and Member of Parliament for Mbinga East constituency since 2005.
