= Sinkamba Kandege =

Tanzanian politician

Honourable Sinkamba Kandege MP

Member of Parliament for Kalambo
- Incumbent
- Assumed office November 2010
- Preceded by: Ludovick Mwananzila

Personal details
- Born: 6 June 1964 (age 62) Rukwa Region, Tanzania
- Party: CCM
- Education: Dar School of Accountcy. (MBA); Arusha Institute of Accountancy
- Profession: Certified Public Accountant

Sinkamba Josephat Kandege (born 6 June 1964) is a Tanzanian CCM politician and Member of Parliament for Kalambo constituency since 2010.
