= Salim Turky =

Tanzanian politician (1963–2020)

Honourable Salim Hassan Turky MP

Member of Parliament for Mpendae
- In office November 2010 – September 2020
- Preceded by: Baharia Mshamba
- Succeeded by: Toufiq Salim Turky

Personal details
- Born: Salim Hassan Abdalla Turky; February 11, 1963
- Died: September 14, 2020 (aged 57)
- Resting place: Fuoni Kijitoupele Burial Site
- Party: CCM
- Spouse: Bi Tamima
- Children: 3
- Education: Sunni Madrasa Zanzibar
- Occupation: Businessman, politician
- Website: www.turkysgroup.co.tz

Salim Hassan Abdullah (born 11 February 1963) Known as Mr. White, was a Tanzanian CCM politician and Member of Parliament for Mpendae constituency from 2010 to his death on the 14th of September 2020 aged 57. He was a co-founder and chairman of Turkys Group of Companies, a group which comprises over 14 companies from health, tourism, transportation, food and water, building materials, oil and gas, communication, engineering, cements making, real estates and other businesses. The companies located in Tanzania Mainland, Zanzibar and Comoros Islands, are operated and administered by his two sons Toufiq Salim Turky as Chief Executive Officer and Abdalla as Executive Director while his only daughter Khaitham concentrates in her own fashion and beauty business.
