= Moses Machali =

Tanzanian politician

Honourable Moses Machali MP
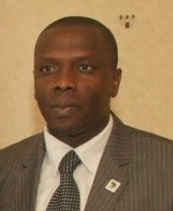

Member of Parliament for Kasulu Town
- In office November 2010 – November 2015

Personal details
- Born: 9 August 1981 (age 45)
- Party: CCM (2016-); ACT Wazalendo (2015–2016); NCCR–Mageuzi (2010–2015); Chadema (2007–2010)
- Education: St. Augustine University of Tanzania (BA)

Moses Joseph Machali (born 9 August 1981) is a Tanzanian NCCR–Mageuzi politician and Member of Parliament for Kasulu Town constituency since 2010 to 2015.

In July 2015, he defected from the NCCR-Mageuzi party to the Alliance for Change and Transparency.
