= Ramadhan Saleh =

Tanzanian politician

Honourable Ramadhan Saleh MP

Member of Parliament for Bumbwini
- Incumbent
- Assumed office November 2010
- Preceded by: Haroub Masoud

Personal details
- Born: 9 January 1972 (age 54)
- Party: CCM

Ramadhan Haji Saleh (born 9 January 1972) is a Tanzanian CCM politician and Member of Parliament for Bumbwini constituency since 2010.
