= Modestus Kilufi =

Tanzanian politician

Honourable Modestus Kilufi MP

Member of Parliament for Mbarali
- Incumbent
- Assumed office November 2010
- Preceded by: Estherina Kilasi

Personal details
- Born: 11 March 1959 (age 67) Tanganyika
- Party: CCM

Modestus Dickson Kilufi (born 11 March 1959) is a Tanzanian CCM politician and Member of Parliament for Mbarali constituency since 2010.
