= Mohamed Mnyaa =

Tanzanian Member of Parliament

Honourable Eng. Mohamed Mnyaa MP

Member of Parliament for Mkanyageni
- Incumbent
- Assumed office December 2005
- Preceded by: Khamis Aboud

Personal details
- Born: 2 December 1955 (age 70) Sultanate of Zanzibar
- Party: CUF
- Education: UDSM (BSc); University of Trondheim (PG)

Mohamed Habib Juma Mnyaa (born 2 December 1955) is a Tanzanian CUF politician and Member of Parliament for Mkanyageni constituency since 2005.
