= Israel Natse =

Tanzanian politician

Honourable Rev. Israel Natse MP

Member of Parliament for Karatu
- In office November 2010 – 2015
- Preceded by: Willbroad Slaa
- Succeeded by: Willy Quambalo

Personal details
- Born: 28 December 1963 (age 62) Tanganyika
- Party: CHADEMA
- Education: Makumira Uni. College (BDiv); University of Helsinki (M.Th)

Israel Yohana Natse (born 28 December 1963) is a Tanzanian CHADEMA politician and Member of Parliament for Karatu constituency since 2010.
