= Juma Ali =

Tanzanian politician

Honourable Juma Ali MP

Member of Parliament for Tumbatu
- Incumbent
- Assumed office November 2010

Personal details
- Born: 10 March 1950 (age 76)
- Party: CCM

Juma Othman Ali (born 10 March 1950) is a Tanzanian CCM politician and Member of Parliament for Tumbatu constituency since 2010.
