= Saleh Pamba =

Tanzanian politician (born 1950)

Honourable Saleh Pamba MP

Member of Parliament for Pangani
- Incumbent
- Assumed office November 2010
- Preceded by: Mohamed Rished Abdallah

Personal details
- Born: 16 October 1950 (age 75) Tanganyika Territory
- Party: CCM
- Education: UDSM (BA); International School of Tourism Sciences (MSc)

Saleh Ahmed Pamba (born 16 October 1950) is a Tanzanian CCM politician and Member of Parliament for Pangani constituency since 2010.
