= Desderius Mipata =

Tanzanian politician

Honourable Desderius Mipata MP

Member of Parliament for Nkasi South
- Incumbent
- Assumed office November 2010

Personal details
- Born: 11 August 1960 (age 65) Tanganyika
- Party: CCM

Desderius John Mipata (born 11 August 1960) is a Tanzanian CCM politician and Member of Parliament for Nkasi South constituency since 2010.
