= Hasnain Murji =

Tanzanian politician (born 1966)

Honourable Hasnain Murji MP

Member of Parliament for Mtwara Town
- In office November 2010 – November 2015
- In office November 2000 – 2005

Personal details
- Born: 24 October 1966 (age 59)
- Party: CCM
- Children: 5

Hasnain Mohamed Murji (born 24 October 1966) is a Tanzanian CCM politician and Member of Parliament for Mtwara Town constituency from 2010 to 2015. He was elected in the 2010 general elections with more than 56% of the popular vote. He had also served the same constituency during the term 2000–2005.

== Early life ==
He was educated at Karume Primary School in Newala and at Mkonge Secondary School in Lindi for his ordinary level education.

== Legislative career ==
He is a member of the Chama cha Mapinduzi political party and first served as the member of parliament for Mtwara Urban constituency during the term 2000–2005. also from the Chama cha Mapinduzi party. In 2010 he was re-elected once again.

In January 2013, he supported Mtwara resident's protest against the construction of a 532 km gas pipeline to Dar es Salaam.
