= Christopher Ole-Sendeka =

Tanzanian politician

Honourable Christopher Ole-Sendeka MP

Member of Parliament for Simanjiro
- In office November 2010 – October 2015 November 2020 = todate
- Preceded by: Parseko Kone

Personal details
- Born: 1 January 1964 (age 62) Tanganyika
- Party: CCM

Christopher Olonyokie Ole-Sendeka (born 1 January 1964) is a Tanzanian CCM politician and Member of Parliament for Simanjiro constituency since 2010.
