= Saidi Mtanda =

Tanzanian politician (born 1980)

Honourable Saidi Mtanda MP

Member of Parliament for Mchinga
- In office November 2010 – November 2020

Personal details
- Born: 19 September 1980 (age 46) Lindi
- Party: CCM
- Education: University of Dar es Salaam
- Website: www.nkasidc.go.tz

Saidi Mohamed Mtanda (born 19 September 1980) is a Tanzanian CCM politician and Member of Parliament for Mchinga constituency since 2010 to 2020.
