= Deo Sanga =

Tanzanian politician

Honourable Deo Sanga MP

Member of Parliament for Njombe North
- Incumbent
- Assumed office November 2010
- Preceded by: Jackson Makwetta

Personal details
- Born: 1 January 1942 (age 84) Tanganyika
- Party: CCM

Deo Kasenyenda Sanga (born 1 January 1942) is a Tanzanian CCM politician and Member of Parliament for Njombe North constituency since 2010.
