= Yahya Kassim Issa =

Tanzanian Member of Parliament

Honourable Yahya Kassim Issa MP

Member of Parliament for Chwaka
- Incumbent
- Assumed office November 1995

Personal details
- Born: 25 September 1950 (age 75) Sultanate of Zanzibar
- Party: CCM

Yahya Kassim Issa (born 25 September 1950) is a Tanzanian CCM politician and Member of Parliament for Chwaka constituency since 2000. Issa was originally a teacher from 1974 to 1982, and moved up in rank in the Ministry of Education, becoming a section leader in 1975, a headmaster in 1984, and a district education inspector in 1991. He arrived at his current position in 1995.
