= Aliko Kibona =

Tanzanian politician

Honourable Aliko Kibona MP
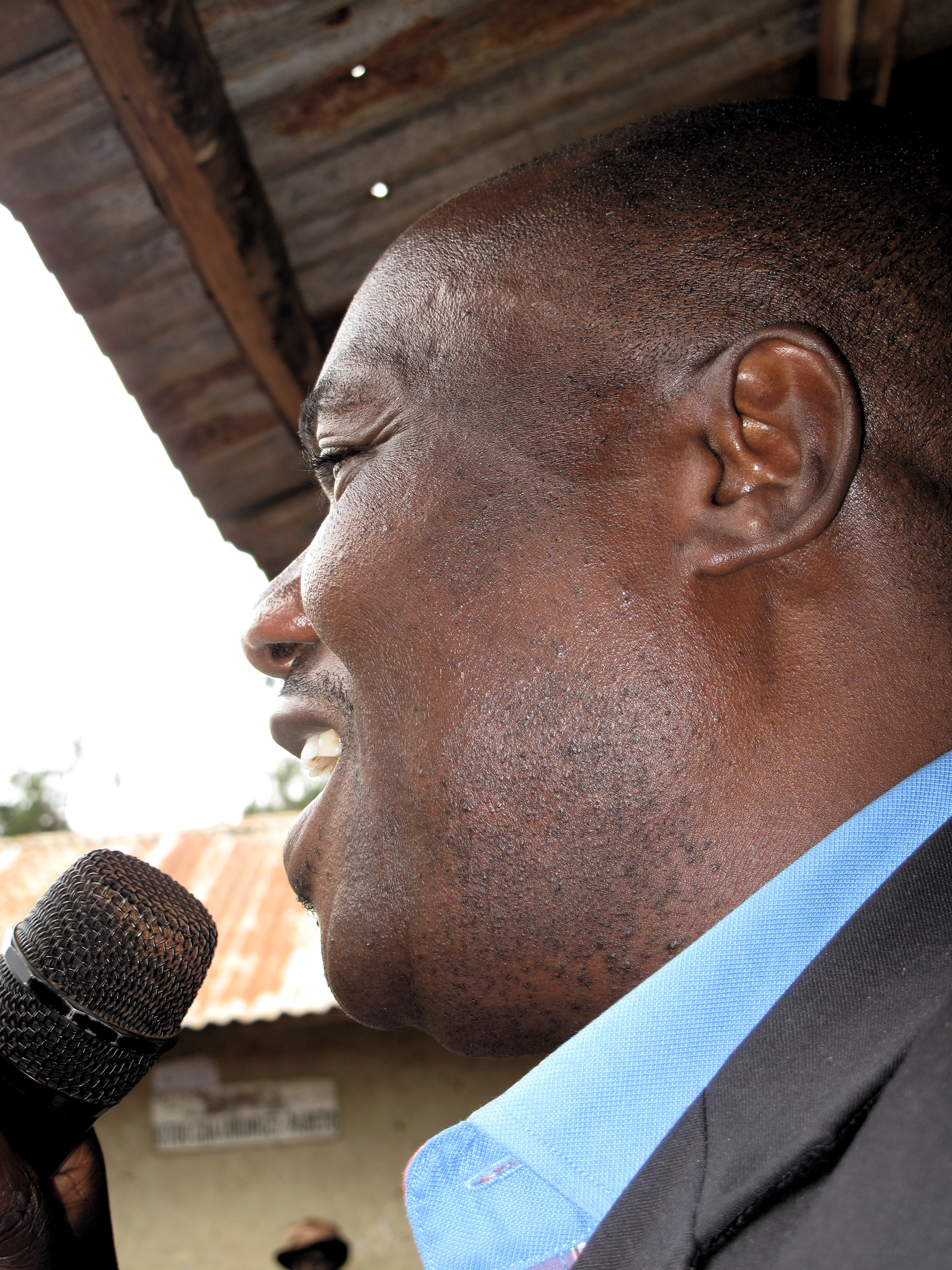

Member of Parliament for Ileje
- Incumbent
- Assumed office November 2010
- Preceded by: Gideon Cheyo

Personal details
- Born: 16 May 1956 (age 70) Ileje District, Songwe Region, Tanganyika Territory
- Party: CCM
- Education: Tumaini University (BA), (MBA)

Aliko Nikusuma Kibona (born 16 May 1956) is a Tanzanian CCM politician and Member of Parliament for Ileje constituency since 2010.
