= Ahmed Ngwali =

Tanzanian politician

Honourable Ahmed Ngwali MP

Member of Parliament for Ziwani
- Incumbent
- Assumed office November 2010
- Preceded by: Ali Said Salim

Personal details
- Born: 1 January 1973 (age 53) Zanzibar
- Party: CUF

Ahmed Juma Ngwali (born 1 January 1973) is a Tanzanian CUF politician and Member of Parliament for Ziwani constituency since 2010.
