= Herbert Mntangi =

Tanzanian politician

Honourable Herbert Mntangi MP

Member of Parliament for Muheza
- In office October 2000 – October 2015

Personal details
- Born: 16 October 1950 (age 75) Tanganyika Territory
- Party: CCM
- Education: UDSM (BCom); University of Salford (MSc)

Herbert James Mntangi (born 16 October 1950) is a Tanzanian CCM politician and Member of Parliament for Muheza constituency since 2000.
