= Donald Max =

Tanzanian politician born (1957-2015)

Honourable Donald Max MP

Member of Parliament for Geita
- In office November 2010 – 23 June 2015
- Preceded by: Ernest Mabina

Personal details
- Born: 22 May 1957 Tanganyika
- Died: 23 June 2015 (aged 58) Dar es Salaam, Tanzania
- Party: CCM
- Education: Volgograd Polytechnical Institute

Donald Kevin Max (22 May 1957 – 23 June 2015) was a Tanzanian CCM politician and Member of Parliament for Geita constituency from 2010 to his death in 2015.
