= Ahmed Shabiby =

Tanzanian politician

Honourable Ahmed Mabukhut Shabiby MP

Member of Parliament for Gairo
- Incumbent
- Assumed office December 2005
- Preceded by: Aaron Chiduo

Personal details
- Born: 14 September 1967 (age 58)
- Party: CCM

Ahmed Mabukhut Shabiby (born 14 September 1967) is a Tanzanian CCM politician and Member of Parliament for Gairo constituency since 2005.
