= Silvestry Koka =

Tanzanian politician

Honourable Silvestry Koka MP

Member of Parliament for Kibaha Town
- Incumbent
- Assumed office November 2010

Personal details
- Born: 15 May 1965 (age 61) Arusha, Tanzania
- Party: CCM
- Education: University of Dar es Salaam

Silvestry Francis Koka (born 15 May 1965 in Arusha) is a Tanzanian CCM politician and Member of Parliament for Kibaha Town constituency since 2010.
