= John Shibuda =

Tanzanian politician (born 1950)

Honourable John Shibuda MP

Member of Parliament for Maswa West
- In office December 2005 – 2015

Personal details
- Born: 23 February 1950 (age 76) Tanganyika
- Party: CHADEMA; CCM (?–?)

John Magale Shibuda (born 23 February 1950) is a Tanzanian Chadema politician and Member of Parliament for Maswa West constituency since 2005.
