= Mendrad Kigola =

Tanzanian politician

Honourable Mendrad Kigola MP

Member of Parliament for Mufindi South
- Incumbent
- Assumed office November 2010
- Preceded by: Benito Malangalila

Personal details
- Born: 10 December 1969 (age 56)
- Party: CCM
- Education: IFM (PGDip); Tumaini University (BBA); University of Strathclyde (MSc)

Mendrad Kigola (born 10 December 1969) is a Tanzanian CCM politician and Member of Parliament for Mufindi South constituency since 2010.
