= Said Suleiman Said =

Tanzanian politician

Honourable Said Suleiman Said MP

Member of Parliament for Mtambwe
- Incumbent
- Assumed office November 2010
- Preceded by: Juma Said Omar

Personal details
- Born: 15 June 1958 (age 67) Sultanate of Zanzibar
- Party: CUF

Said Suleiman Said (born 15 June 1958) is a Tanzanian CUF politician and Member of Parliament for Mtambwe constituency since 2010.
