= Meshack Opulukwa =

Tanzanian politician

Honourable Meshack Opulukwa MP

Member of Parliament for Meatu
- Incumbent
- Assumed office November 2010
- Preceded by: Salum K. Salum

Personal details
- Born: 27 July 1967 (age 58)
- Party: CHADEMA

Meshack Jeremiah Opulukwa (born 27 July 1967) is a Tanzanian CHADEMA politician and Member of Parliament for Meatu constituency since 2010.
