= Ramo Makani =

Tanzanian politician

Honourable Eng. Ramo Makani MP

Member of Parliament for Tunduru North
- Incumbent
- Assumed office November 2010

Personal details
- Born: 22 September 1960 (age 66) Tanganyika
- Party: CCM
- Education: University of Dar es Salaam

Ramo Matala Makani (born 22 September 1960) is a Tanzanian CCM politician and Member of Parliament for Tunduru North constituency since 2010.
