= Amina Clement =

Tanzanian politician

Honourable Amina Clement MP

Member of Parliament for Koani
- Incumbent
- Assumed office November 2010
- Preceded by: Haroub Masoud

Personal details
- Born: 3 March 1963 (age 63) Sultanate of Zanzibar
- Party: CCM

Amina Andrew Clement (born 3 March 1963) is a Tanzanian CCM politician and Member of Parliament for Koani constituency since 2005.
