= Mustapha Akunaay =

Tanzanian politician

Honourable Mustapha Akunaay MP

Member of Parliament for Mbulu
- In office November 2010 – November 2015
- Preceded by: Philip Marmo

Personal details
- Born: 15 August 1952 (age 74) Tanganyika
- Party: CHADEMA
- Education: IDM; Open University of Tanzania (LL.B)

Mustapha Boay Akunaay (born 15 August 1952) is a Tanzanian CHADEMA politician and Member of Parliament for Mbulu constituency since 2010.
