= David Mallole =

Tanzanian politician

Honorable David Mallole MP

Member of Parliament for Dodoma Town
- In office November 2010 – November 2015
- Succeeded by: Anthony Mavunde

Personal details
- Born: 26 December 1955 (age 70) Tanganyika
- Party: CCM
- Education: St. Augustine TZ (BA); Pontifical Urban University (B.Phil)

David Mciwa Mallole (born 26 December 1955) is a Tanzanian CCM politician and Member of Parliament for Dodoma Town constituency since 2010 to 2015.
