= Assumpter Mshama =

Tanzanian politician

Honourable Assumpter Mshama MP

Member of Parliament for Nkenge
- Incumbent
- Assumed office November 2010
- Preceded by: Diodorus Kamala

Personal details
- Party: CCM
- Children: 3

Assumpter Nshunju Mshama is a Tanzanian CCM politician and Member of Parliament for Nkenge constituency since 2010.
