= Benedict Ole-Nangoro =

Tanzanian politician

Honourable Benedict Ole-Nangoro MP
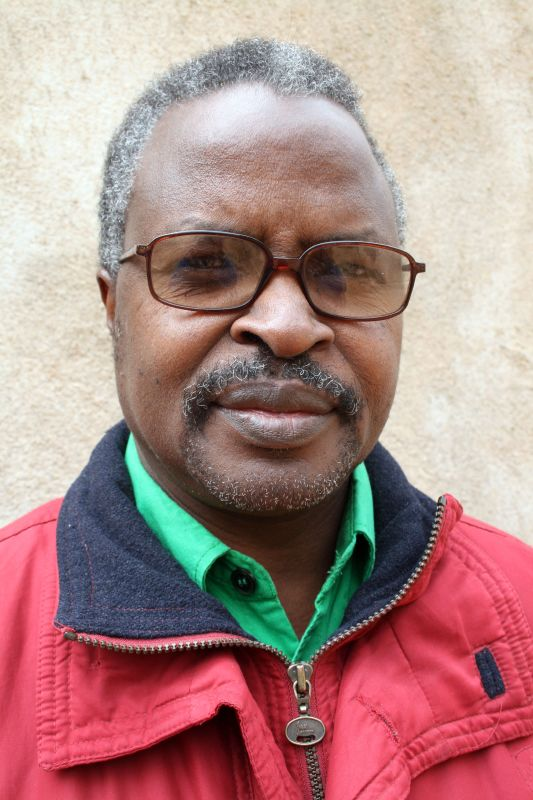

Deputy Minister of Livestock Development and Fisheries
- In office 28 November 2010 – 20 January 2014
- Minister: David Mathayo David
- Succeeded by: Kaika Telele

Member of Parliament for Kiteto
- Incumbent
- Assumed office 2008

Personal details
- Born: 17 July 1956 (age 70) Tanganyika
- Party: CCM
- Education: Oldonyo Sambui Catholic Seminary; Kibosho Senior Seminary; Kipalapala Major Seminary; Institute of Development Studies (Cert); University of Sussex (MPhil)

Benedict Ngalama Ole-Nangoro (born 17 July 1956) is a Tanzanian CCM politician and Member of Parliament for Kiteto constituency since 2008. He served as the Deputy Minister of Livestock Development and Fisheries from 2010 to 2014.
