= Selemani Bungara =

Tanzanian politician (1961–2026)

Honourable Selemani Bungara MP

Member of Parliament for Kilwa South
- In office November 2010 – August 2020
- Preceded by: Hasnain Dewji
- Succeeded by: Kassinge Ally

Personal details
- Born: 18 November 1961 Tanganyika Territory
- Died: 30 March 2026 (aged 64) Dar es Salaam, Tanzania
- Party: Alliance for Change and Transparency

Selemani Saidi Ally Bungara (18 November 1961 – 30 March 2026) was a Tanzanian ACT Wazalendo politician who was a Member of Parliament for Kilwa South constituency from 2005 to 2020. In 2020, Bungala joined ACT Wazalendo before losing his seat to Kassinge Ally.

== Illness and death ==
Bungara died from kidney failure in Dar es Salaam, on 30 March 2026, at the age of 64. Having lost a leg and been confined to a wheelchair due to illness, he had been undergoing dialysis treatment at a private hospital in Kigamboni, before his condition worsened.
