= Juma Njwayo =

Tanzanian politician

Honourable Juma Njwayo MP

Member of Parliament for Tandahimba
- Incumbent
- Assumed office December 2005
- Preceded by: Abdula Lutavi

Personal details
- Born: 10 March 1964 (age 62) Tanganyika
- Party: CCM
- Education: Open University of TZ (LL.M); Dar es Salaam Uni. (PgDL)

Juma Abdallah Njwayo (born 10 March 1964) is a Tanzanian CCM politician and Member of Parliament for Tandahimba constituency since 2005.
