= James Lembeli =

Tanzanian politician

Honourable James Lembeli MP

Member of Parliament for Kahama
- Incumbent
- Assumed office December 2005
- Preceded by: Raphael Mlolwa

Personal details
- Born: 26 December 1956 (age 69) Kahama District, Shinyanga Region, Tanganyika Territory
- Party: CHADEMA (2015–); CCM (?–2015)
- Education: Journalist College, Zambia
- Position(s): Radio presenter, Deutsche Welle; PR Manager, TANAPA (1993–05)

James Daudi Lembeli (born 26 December 1956) is a Tanzanian politician who served as a Member of Parliament for Kahama constituency from 2005 to 2015 via the ruling Chama Cha Mapinduzi (CCM) party.

On 18 July 2015, he announced that he would not defend his electoral seat through the ruling party. Three days later, he announced his decision to defect to the opposition Chadema party.
