= Ignas Malocha =

Tanzanian politician

Honourable Ignas Malocha MP

Member of Parliament for Kwela
- Incumbent
- Assumed office November 2010
- Preceded by: Chrisant Mzindakaya

Personal details
- Born: 22 December 1960 (age 65) Tanganyika
- Party: CCM

Ignas Aloyce Malocha (born 22 December 1960) is a Tanzanian CCM politician and Member of Parliament for Kwela constituency since 2010.
