= Salvatory Machemli =

Tanzanian politician

Honourable Salvatory Machemli MP

Member of Parliament for Ukerewe
- Incumbent
- Assumed office November 2010
- Preceded by: Gertrude Mongella

Personal details
- Born: 14 January 1971 (age 55)
- Party: CHADEMA
- Education: DIT

Salvatory Naluyaga Machemli (born 14 January 1971) is a Tanzanian CHADEMA politician, and has been a Member of Parliament for Ukerewe constituency since 2010.
