= Peter Msolla =

Tanzanian politician

Hon. Professor Peter Msolla MP
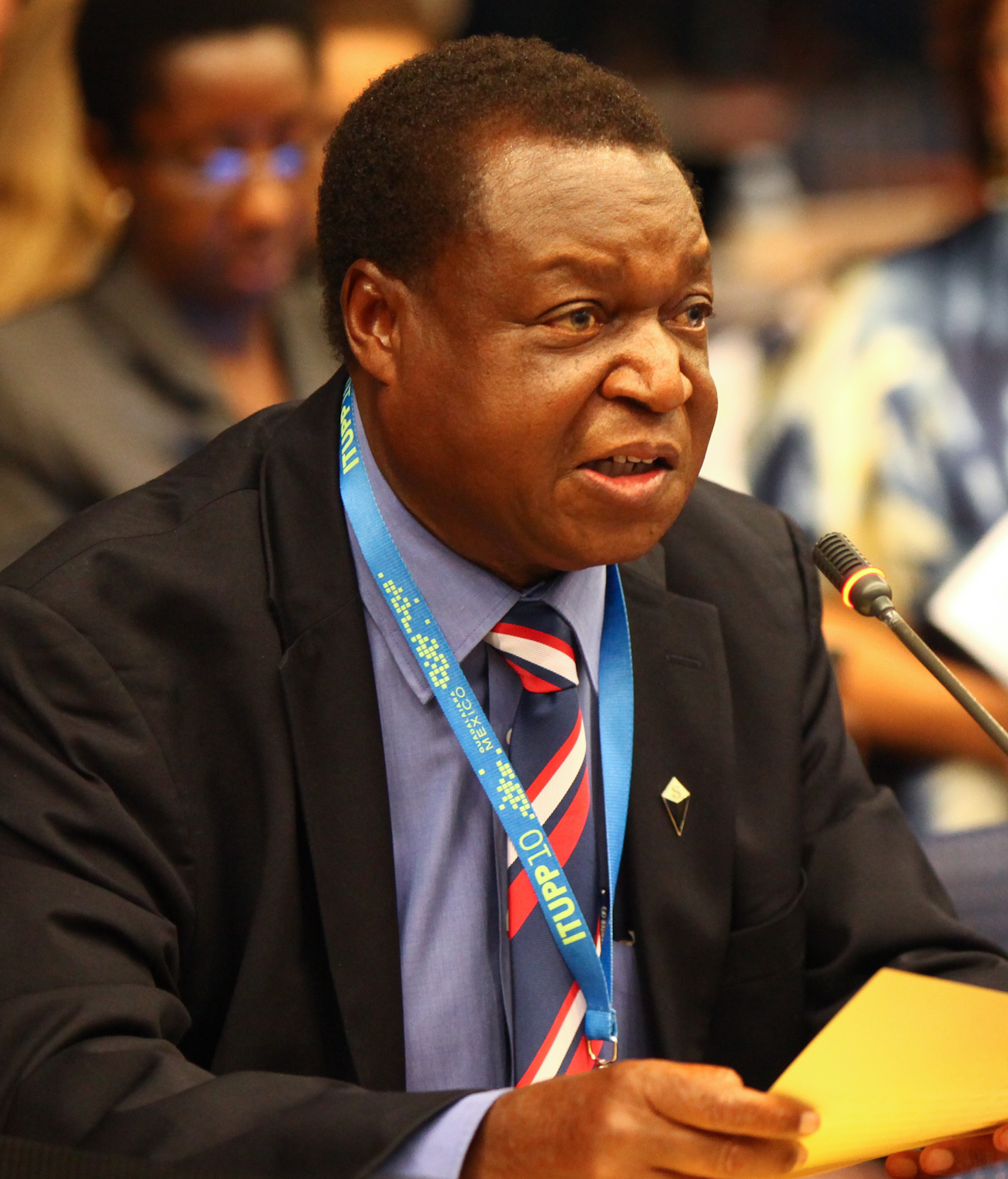

Member of Parliament for Kilolo
- Incumbent
- Assumed office December 2005
- Preceded by: Venance Mwamoto

Personal details
- Born: 6 November 1945 (age 80)
- Party: CCM
- Education: University of Edinburgh (Adv Dip); University of Nairobi (BVM); University of Glasgow (PhD)
- Position(s): Professor, Sokoine (1980–2015)

Peter Mahamudu Msolla (born 6 November 1945) is a Tanzanian CCM politician and Member of Parliament for Kilolo constituency since 2005.
