= Lolesia Bukwimba =

Tanzanian politician and member of parliament

Honourable Lolesia Bukwimba MP

Member of Parliament for Busanda
- Incumbent
- Assumed office November 2010

Personal details
- Born: 24 February 1971 (age 55)
- Party: CCM
- Education: Sokoine University (BSc); SNHU (MSc)

Lolesia Jeremiah Maselle Bukwimba (born 24 February 1971) is a Tanzanian CCM politician and Member of Parliament for Busanda constituency since 2010.
