= David Silinde =

Tanzanian politician

Honourable David Silinde MP

Member of Parliament for Mbozi West
- Incumbent
- Assumed office November 2010
- Preceded by: Luka Siyame

Deputy Minister President Office's, Regional Administration and Local Government
- Incumbent
- Assumed office 2020
- Appointed by: John Magufuli

Personal details
- Born: 28 July 1984 (age 42)
- Party: Chama cha Mapinduzi
- Education: University of Dar es Salaam

David Ernest Silinde (born 28 July 1984) is a Tanzanian CCM politician and Member of Parliament for Mbozi West constituency since 2010. He is a Deputy Minister in President's office, Regional Administration and Local Government appointed by President John Magufuli.
