= Said Arfi =

Tanzanian politician

Honourable Said Arfi MP

Member of Parliament for Mpanda Town
- In office November 2010 – November 2015

Member of Parliament for Mpanda Central
- In office December 2005 – 16 July 2010

Personal details
- Born: 9 February 1952 (age 74) Tanganyika
- Party: CHADEMA (2005–2015); CCM (1977–2002) (2015-present)

Said Amour Arfi (born 9 February 1952) is a Tanzanian CCM politician and was a Member of Parliament for Mpanda Town constituency since 2005 to 2015.

On 5 July 2015, he announced that he would be leaving the Chadema party as soon as the 10th Parliament is dissolved. He also emphasized that he was certain the constituency would be won by the ruling Chama Cha Mapinduzi in the 2015 election.
