= Ezekiel Maige =

Tanzanian politician

Honourable Ezekiel Maige MP

Member of Parliament for Msalala
- In office December 2005 – November 2015
- Preceded by: Emmanuel Kipole
- Succeeded by: Iddi Kassim Iddi

Personal details
- Born: 28 March 1970 (age 56) Kahama Urban District, Shinyanga Region
- Party: CCM
- Education: IFM (AdvDip); University of Leicester (MSc)
- Profession: Certified Public Accountant
- Position(s): FD, British Council TZ

Ezekiel Magolyo Maige (born 28 March 1970) is a Tanzanian CCM politician and Member of Parliament for Msalala constituency from 2005 to 2015.
