= Jason Rweikiza =

Tanzanian politician

Honourable Jasson Rweikiza MP

Member of Parliament for Bukoba Rural
- Incumbent
- Assumed office November 2010
- Preceded by: Nazir Karamagi

Personal details
- Party: CCM

Jason Samson Rweikiza is a Tanzanian CCM politician and Member of Parliament for Bukoba Rural constituency since 2010.
