= Hussein Mzee =

Tanzanian politician

Honourable Hussein Mzee MP

Member of Parliament for Jangombe
- Incumbent
- Assumed office November 2010

Personal details
- Born: 1 March 1964 (age 62)
- Party: CCM

Hussein Mussa Mzee (born 1 March 1964) is a Tanzanian CCM politician and Member of Parliament for Jangombe constituency since 2010.
