= Omary Badwel =

Tanzanian politician

Honourable Omary Badwel MP

Member of Parliament for Bahi
- Incumbent
- Assumed office November 2010
- Preceded by: William Kusila

Personal details
- Born: 5 March 1969 (age 57)
- Party: CCM

Omary Ahmad Badwel (born 5 March 1969) is a Tanzanian CCM politician and Member of Parliament for Bahi constituency since 2010.
