= Ally Keissy =

Tanzanian politician

Honourable Ally Keissy MP

Member of Parliament for Nkasi North
- Incumbent
- Assumed office November 2010

Personal details
- Born: 15 October 1949 (age 76) Tanganyika
- Party: CCM

Ally Mohamed Keissy (born 15 October 1949) is a Tanzanian CCM politician and Member of Parliament for Nkasi North constituency since 2010.
