= Haji Mussa =

Tanzanian politician

Honourable Haji Mussa MP

Member of Parliament for Chake Chake
- Incumbent
- Assumed office November 2010
- Preceded by: Fatma Maghimbi

Personal details
- Born: Zanzibar
- Party: CUF

Haji Kombo Mussa is a Tanzanian CUF politician and Member of Parliament for Chake Chake constituency since 2010.
