= Haji Faki =

Tanzanian politician

Honourable Haji Faki MP

Member of Parliament for Mtoni
- Incumbent
- Assumed office November 2010
- Preceded by: Ussi Pandu

Personal details
- Born: Zanzibar
- Party: CUF

Haji Makame Faki is a Tanzanian CUF politician and Member of Parliament for Mtoni constituency since 2010.
