= Luckson Mwanjale =

Tanzanian politician

Honourable Rev. Luckson Mwanjale MP

Member of Parliament for Mbeya Rural
- Incumbent
- Assumed office 2009

Personal details
- Born: 3 January 1950 (age 76) Tanganyika
- Party: CCM
- Education: Chang'ombe TTC (Dip)
- Profession: Teacher

Luckson Ndaga Mwanjale (born 3 January 1950) is a Tanzanian CCM politician and Member of Parliament for Mbeya Rural constituency since 2009.
