= Agripina Buyogera =

Tanzanian politician

Honourable Agripina Buyogera MP

Member of Parliament for Kasulu Rural
- In office November 2010 – November 2015

Chairperson NCCR-MAGEUZI Women Wing
- In office 2010–2020

Personal details
- Born: 16 August 1966 (age 60)
- Party: NCCR–Mageuzi
- Education: Kiganamo Primary School

Agripina Zaituni Buyogera (born 16 August 1966) is a Tanzanian NCCR–Mageuzi politician and Member of Parliament for Kasulu Rural constituency.
