= Shanif Mansoor =

Tanzanian politician (born 1967)

Honourable Shanif Mansoor MP

Member of Parliament for Kwimba
- Incumbent
- Assumed office November 2010
- Preceded by: Bujiku Sakila

Personal details
- Born: 5 May 1967 (age 58)
- Party: CCM

Shanif Hiran Mansoor (born 5 May 1967) is a Tanzanian CCM politician and Member of Parliament for Kwimba constituency since 2010.
