= Sadifa Khamis =

Tanzanian politician

Honourable Sadifa Khamis MP

Member of Parliament for Donge
- Incumbent
- Assumed office November 2010

Personal details
- Born: 7 February 1982 (age 44) Zanzibar, Tanzania
- Party: CCM
- Education: Zanzibar University (LL.B)

Sadifa Juma Khamis (born 7 February 1982) is a Tanzanian CCM politician and Member of Parliament for Donge constituency since 2005.
