= Waride Jabu =

Tanzanian politician

Honourable Waride Jabu MP

Member of Parliament for Kiembesamaki
- Incumbent
- Assumed office November 2010

Personal details
- Born: 5 March 1961 (age 65)
- Party: CCM
- Education: University of Mauritius (BSc)

Waride Bakari Jabu (born 5 March 1961) is a Tanzanian CCM politician and Member of Parliament for Kiembesamaki constituency since 2010.
