= Philemon Ndesamburo =

Tanzanian politician (1935–2017)

Honourable Philemon Ndesamburo MP
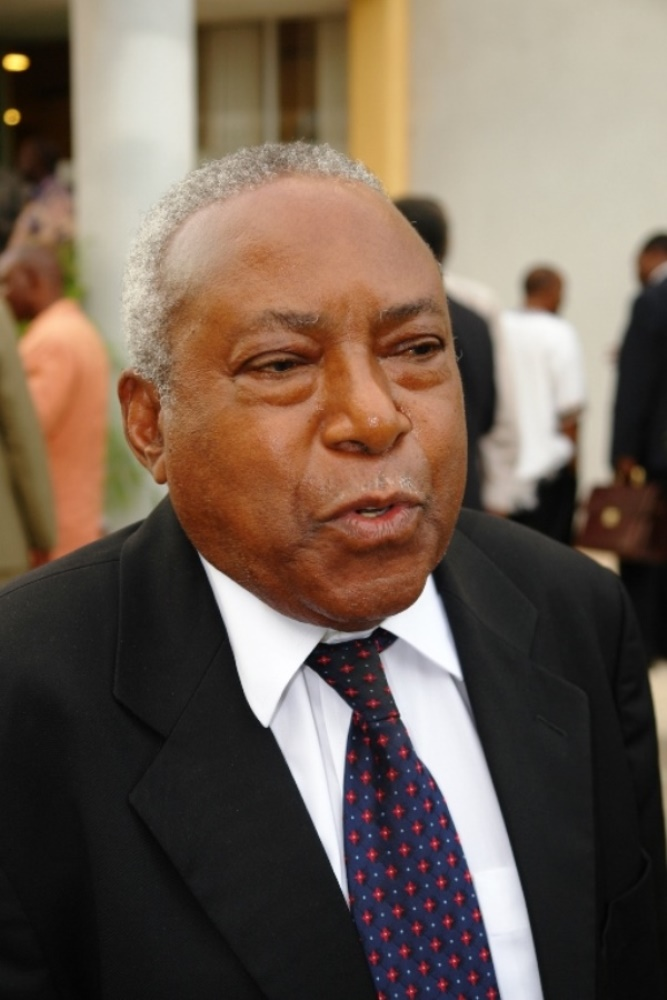

Member of Parliament for Moshi Town
- Incumbent
- Assumed office November 2000
- Succeeded by: Jaffary Michael

Personal details
- Born: 19 February 1935 Tanganyika
- Died: 31 May 2017 (aged 82) Moshi, Tanzania
- Party: CHADEMA

Philemon Kiwelu Ndesamburo (19 February 1935 – 31 May 2017) was a Tanzanian CHADEMA politician and Member of Parliament for Moshi Town constituency from 2000 to 2015. He died on 31 May 2017, at the age of 82.
