= Abdul Marombwa =

Tanzanian politician (born 1959)

Honourable Abdul Marombwa MP

Member of Parliament for Kibiti
- In office November 2010 – November 2015
- Preceded by: Abdul Marombwa
- Succeeded by: Seif Ally

Personal details
- Born: 25 November 1959 (age 66) Tanganyika
- Party: CCM
- Spouse: Fatuma Palla
- Children: Adam Marombwa, Mansour Marombwa, Saad Marombwa, Twayb Marombwa, Hamid Marombwa, Japhary Marombwa, Moustaph Marombwa
- Education: University of Dar es Salaam; Open University of Tanzania (PGDE)
- Profession: Teacher

Abdul Jabiri Marombwa (born 25 November 1959) is a Tanzanian CCM politician and Member of Parliament for Kibiti constituency from 2005, and re-elected 2010 until 2015.
