= Abdul-Aziz Abood =

Tanzanian businessman and politician

Honourable Abdul-Aziz Abood MP

Member of Parliament for Morogoro Urban
- Incumbent
- Assumed office November 2010
- Preceded by: Omari Nibuka

Personal details
- Born: 27 May 1959 (age 66) Tanganyika
- Party: CCM
- Children: Wisam Abood

Abdul-Aziz Mohamed Abood (born 27 May 1959) is a Tanzanian CCM politician and businessman. He is a Member of Parliament for Morogoro Urban constituency since 2010.
