= Khatib Haji =

Tanzanian politician (1962–2021)

Honourable Khatib Haji MP

Member of Parliament for Konde
- In office November 2010 – 20 May 2021
- Preceded by: Ali Tarab Ali

Personal details
- Born: 31 July 1962 Sultanate of Zanzibar
- Died: May 20, 2021 (aged 58) Dar es Salaam, Tanzania
- Party: ACT Wazalendo
- Other political affiliations: Civic United Front (CUF)
- Occupation: Politician

Khatib Said Haji (31 July 1962 – 20 May 2021) was a Tanzanian ACT Wazalendo politician and Member of Parliament for the Konde constituency from 2010 until his death. He was also the Minister of Agriculture of Zanzibar from 1984 to 1987. He died on 20 May 2021 as he was undergoing treatment at the Muhimbili National Hospital. He was the third member to die during the 12th Tanzanian Parliament.
