= Moshi Kakoso =

Tanzanian politician

Honourable Moshi Kakoso MP

Member of Parliament for Mpanda Rural
- Incumbent
- Assumed office November 2010

Personal details
- Born: 2 May 1968 (age 58)
- Party: CCM
- Education: MUCCoBS (Cert)

Moshi Selemani Kakoso (born 2 May 1968) is a Tanzanian CCM politician and Member of Parliament for Mpanda Rural constituency since 2010.
