= Hezekiah Chibulunje =

Tanzanian politician

Honourable Hezekiah Chibulunje MP

Deputy Minister of Infrastructure Development
- In office 2008–2010
- Minister: Basil Mramba

Member of Parliament for Chilonwa
- Incumbent
- Assumed office November 1995

Personal details
- Born: 15 March 1946 (age 80) Tanganyika
- Party: CCM
- Education: MUCCoBS (Adv. Dip)

Military service
- Allegiance: United Rep. of Tanzania
- Branch/service: National Service
- Military camp: Kaboya and Mafinga
- Duration: 1 year

Hezekiah Ndahani Chibulunje (born 15 March 1946) is a Tanzanian CCM politician and Member of Parliament for Chilonwa constituency since 1995.
