= Eustace Katagira =

Tanzanian politician

Honourable Eustace Katagira MP

Member of Parliament for Kyerwa
- Incumbent
- Assumed office December 2005
- Preceded by: Benedicto Mutungilehi

Personal details
- Born: 14 July 1948 (age 77) Tanganyika
- Party: CCM
- Profession: Chartered Certified Accountant

Eustace Osler Katagira (born 14 July 1948) is a Tanzanian CCM politician and Member of Parliament for Kyerwa constituency since 2005.
