= Bukene, Tanzania =

Bukene
- Town
- Location in Tanzania
- Coordinates: 04°14′S 32°53′E
- Country: Tanzania
- Region: Tabora
- District: Nzega

Population (2012)
  - Total: 7,641
- Time zone: GMT+3
- Climate: Aw

Bukene is a town and a ward in central Tanzania. It is located in Nzega District of Tabora Region.

According to the 2012 Tanzania National Census, the population of Bukene Ward was 7,641.

== Transport ==
It is served by a station on the Central Line railway of Tanzania.
