= Stephen Ngonyani =

Tanzanian politician (1956–2018)

Honourable Stephen Ngonyani MP

Member of Parliament for Korogwe Rural
- In office November 2010 – July 2018
- Preceded by: Laus Mhina

Personal details
- Born: 25 May 1956 Tanganyika
- Died: 1 July 2018 (aged 62) Muhimbili National Hospital
- Party: CCM
- Nickname: Profesa Maji Marefu

Stephen Hilary Ngonyani (25 May 1956 – 1 July 2018) was a Tanzanian CCM politician and Member of Parliament for Korogwe Rural constituency since 2010. He died at Muhimbili National Hospital (MNH) on 1 July 2018.
