= Ahmed Salum =

Tanzanian politician

Honourable Ahmed Salum MP

Member of Parliament for Solwa
- Incumbent
- Assumed office December 2005
- Preceded by: Robert Bazuka

Personal details
- Born: 28 June 1966 (age 60)
- Party: CCM
- Education: IIT Dar es Salaam (Dip)

Ahmed Ally Salum (born 28 June 1966) is a Tanzanian CCM politician and Member of Parliament for Solwa constituency since 2005.
