= Faith Mitambo =

Tanzanian politician

Honourable Faith Mitambo MP

Member of Parliament for Liwale
- Incumbent
- Assumed office November 2010
- Preceded by: Mudhihir M. Mudhihir

Personal details
- Born: 29 September 1959 (age 67)
- Party: CCM
- Education: Rwegalulila Water Resources Institute (Cert)

Faith Mohamed Mitambo (born 29 September 1959) is a Tanzanian CCM politician and Member of Parliament for Liwale constituency since 2010.
