= Sylvester Kasulumbayi =

Tanzanian politician

Honourable Sylvester Kasulumbayi MP

Member of Parliament for Maswa East
- Incumbent
- Assumed office November 2010

Personal details
- Born: 1 January 1950 (age 76) Tanganyika
- Party: CHADEMA
- Education: Monduli TTC (Cert)
- Profession: Teacher

Sylvester Mhoja Kasulumbayi (born 1 January 1950) is a Tanzanian CHADEMA politician and Member of Parliament for Maswa East constituency since 2010.
