= Muhammad Sanya =

Tanzanian politician (born 1956)

Honourable Muhammad Sanya MP

Member of Parliament for Mji Mkongwe
- Incumbent
- Assumed office December 2005
- Preceded by: Abdullatif Esmail

Member of Parliament for Mkunazini
- In office 1995–2005

Personal details
- Born: 21 July 1956 (age 69) Sultanate of Zanzibar
- Party: CUF

Muhammad Ibrahim Sanya (born 21 July 1956) is a Tanzanian CUF politician and Member of Parliament for Mji Mkongwe constituency since 2010.
