= Nyambari Nyangwine =

Tanzanian politician (born 1976)

Honourable Nyambari Nyangwine MP

Member of Parliament for Tarime
- Incumbent
- Assumed office November 2010
- Preceded by: Charles Nyanguru

Personal details
- Born: 7 August 1976 (age 50)
- Party: CCM
- Education: University of Dar es Salaam

Nyambari Chacha Mariba Nyangwine (born 7 August 1976) is a Tanzanian CCM politician and Member of Parliament for Tarime constituency since 2010.
