= Peter Serukamba =

Tanzanian politician

Honourable Peter Serukamba MP

Member of Parliament
- In office November 2010 – October 2015
- Constituency: Kigoma Town
- Succeeded by: Assa Makanika
- Constituency: Kigoma Rural

Personal details
- Born: 6 June 1972 (age 54)
- Party: CCM
- Education: IFM (AdvDip); ESAMI / Maastricht (MBA)

Peter Joseph Serukamba (born 6 June 1972) is a Tanzanian CCM politician and Member of Parliament for Kigoma Town constituency since 2010.
