= Festus Limbu =

Tanzanian politician

Honourable Dr Festus Limbu MP

Member of Parliament for Magu Town
- Incumbent
- Assumed office November 2010

Personal details
- Born: 19 April 1956 (age 70) Magu District, Mwanza Region, Tanganyika Territory
- Party: CCM
- Education: University of Dar es Salaam; BIDS (MSc); Technische Universität Berlin (PhD)

Festus Bulugu Limbu (born 19 April 1956) is a Tanzanian CCM politician and Member of Parliament for Magu Town constituency since 2010.
