= Livingstone Lusinde =

Tanzanian politician

Honourable Livingstone Lusinde MP

Member of Parliament for Mtera
- Incumbent
- Assumed office November 2010

Personal details
- Born: 4 March 1972 (age 54) Dodoma, Tanzania
- Party: CCM
- Education: CCM College Ihemi (Cert)

Livingstone Joseph Lusinde (born 4 March 1972 in Dodoma) is a Tanzanian CCM politician and Member of Parliament for Mtera constituency since 2010.
