= Haji Sereweji =

Tanzanian politician

Honourable Haji Sereweji MP

Member of Parliament for Mwanakwerekwe
- Incumbent
- Assumed office November 2010

Personal details
- Born: 5 February 1948 (age 78)
- Party: CCM

Haji Juma Sereweji (born 5 February 1948) is a Tanzanian CCM politician and Member of Parliament for Mwanakwerekwe constituency since 2010.
