= Juma Sururu Juma =

Tanzanian politician

Honourable Juma Sururu Juma MP

Member of Parliament for Bububu
- Incumbent
- Assumed office November 2010

Personal details
- Born: 1 March 1966 (age 60)
- Party: CCM

Juma Sururu Juma (born 1 March 1966) is a Tanzanian CCM politician and Member of Parliament for Bububu constituency since 2010.
