= Abdulkarim Shah =

Tanzanian politician (1961–2020)

Honourable Abdulkarim Shah MP

Member of Parliament for Mafia
- In office November 2000 – November 2015
- Succeeded by: Mbaraka Dau

Personal details
- Born: 25 November 1961 Tanganyika
- Died: 25 April 2020 (aged 58) Dar es Salaam, Tanzania
- Party: CCM
- Education: Muhimbili Primary School; Kinondoni Secondary School; IDS, Cairo (Cert)

Abdulkarim Esmail Shah (25 November 1961 – 25 April 2020) was a Tanzanian CCM politician and Member of Parliament for Mafia constituency.
