= Suleiman Omar =

Tanzanian Member of Parliament

Honourable Suleiman Omar MP

Member of Parliament for Mfenesini
- Incumbent
- Assumed office November 2010

Personal details
- Party: CCM

Suleiman Nassib Omar is a Tanzanian CCM politician and Member of Parliament for Mfenesini constituency since 2010.
