= John Lwanji =

Tanzanian politician

Honourable John Lwanji MP

Member of Parliament for Manyoni West
- Incumbent
- Assumed office December 2005
- Preceded by: Ismail Iwvatta

Personal details
- Born: 1 March 1949 (age 77) Tanganyika
- Party: CCM
- Education: IDM, Mzumbe University (PGDip)

John Paul Lwanji (born 1 March 1949) is a Tanzanian CCM politician and Member of Parliament for Manyoni West constituency since 2005.
