= Ali Khamis Seif =

Tanzanian politician

Honourable Ali Khamis Seif MP

Member of Parliament for Mkoani
- Incumbent
- Assumed office December 2005
- Preceded by: Issa Mohamed Salim

Personal details
- Born: 8 April 1954 (age 72) Sultanate of Zanzibar
- Party: CUF
- Education: Nkrumah Teachers' Training College

Ali Khamis Seif (born 8 April 1954) is a Tanzanian CUF politician and Member of Parliament for Mkoani constituency since 2005.
