= Antony Mbassa =

Tanzanian Member of Parliament

Honourable Antony Mbassa MP

Member of Parliament for Biharamulo West
- Incumbent
- Assumed office November 2010
- Preceded by: Oscar Mukasa

Personal details
- Born: 3 February 1972 (age 54)
- Party: CHADEMA

Antony Gervase Mbassa (born 3 February 1972) is a Tanzanian CHADEMA politician and Member of Parliament for Biharamulo West constituency since 2010.
