= Yusuph Nassir =

Tanzanian Member of Parliament

Honourable Yusuph Nassir MP

Member of Parliament for Korogwe Town
- Incumbent
- Assumed office November 2010

Personal details
- Born: 25 April 1965 (age 61)
- Party: CCM
- Education: Mkwawa TC (AdvDip); IDM Mzumbe
- Profession: Teacher

Yusuph Abdallah Nassir (born 25 April 1965) is a Tanzanian CCM politician and Member of Parliament for Korogwe Town constituency since 2010.
