= Rajab Mohammed =

Tanzanian politician

Honourable Rajab Mohammed MP

Member of Parliament for Ole
- Incumbent
- Assumed office November 2010
- Preceded by: Bakari Faki

Personal details
- Born: 2 November 1963 (age 62) Sultanate of Zanzibar
- Party: CUF
- Education: Karume Technical College

Rajab Mbarouk Mohammed (born 2 November 1963) is a Tanzanian CUF politician and Member of Parliament for Ole constituency since 2010.
