= Kombo Khamis Kombo =

Tanzanian politician

Honourable Kombo Khamis Kombo MP

Member of Parliament for Mgogoni
- Incumbent
- Assumed office November 2010
- Preceded by: Mohamed Ali Said

Personal details
- Born: 15 February 1963 (age 63) Sultanate of Zanzibar
- Party: CUF

Kombo Khamis Kombo (born 15 February 1963) is a Tanzanian CUF politician and Member of Parliament for Mgogoni constituency since 2010.
