= Rashid Omar =

Tanzanian Member of Parliament

Honourable Rashid Omar MP

Member of Parliament for Kojani
- Incumbent
- Assumed office November 2010
- Preceded by: Salim Mohamed

Personal details
- Born: 13 January 1961 (age 65) Sultanate of Zanzibar
- Party: CUF

Rashid Ali Omar (born 13 January 1961) is a Tanzanian CUF politician and Member of Parliament for Kojani constituency since 2010.
