= Mohamed Missanga =

Tanzanian politician

Honourable Mohamed Missanga MP

Member of Parliament for Singida South
- Incumbent
- Assumed office November 2010

Personal details
- Born: 15 March 1945 (age 81) Tanganyika
- Party: CCM
- Education: Thames Valley University (Dip)

Mohamed Hamisi Missanga (born 15 March 1945) is a Tanzanian CCM politician and Member of Parliament for Singida South constituency since 2010.
