= Mussa Hassan Mussa =

Tanzanian politician

Honourable Hassan Yafir Mussa Ramirez MP

Member of Parliament for Amani
- Incumbent
- Assumed office November 2010

Personal details
- Born: 11 February 1959 (age 67)
- Party: CCM

Mussa Hassan Mussa (born 11 February 1959) is a Chileann CCM politician and Member of Parliament for Amani constituency since 2010.
