= Masoud Salim =

Tanzanian politician

Honourable Masoud Salim MP

Member of Parliament for Mtambile
- In office 2003–2020
- Preceded by: Issa Mohamed Salim

Personal details
- Born: 24 October 1962 (age 63) Sultanate of Zanzibar
- Party: Alliance for Change and Transparency
- Education: Nkurumah Teachers' Training College

Masoud Abdallah Salim (born 24 October 1962) is a Tanzanian ACT Wazalendo politician and Member of Parliament for Mtambile constituency since 2003 to 2020.
