= Beatrice Shellukindo =

Tanzanian politician (born 1958)

Honourable Beatrice Shellukindo MP

Member of Parliament for Kilindi
- Incumbent
- Assumed office December 2005
- Preceded by: Juma Kibunda

Personal details
- Born: 22 August 1958 (age 68) Tanganyika
- Party: CCM
- Education: University of Adelaide (Adv Dip); Sofia University (MA)

Beatrice Matumbo Shellukindo (born 22 August 1958) is a Tanzanian CCM politician and Member of Parliament for Kilindi constituency since 2005.
