= Innocent Kalogeris =

Tanzanian politician

Honourable Innocent Kalogeris MP

Member of Parliament for Morogoro South
- Incumbent
- Assumed office November 2010
- Preceded by: Hamza Mwenegoha

Personal details
- Born: 3 March 1959 (age 67) Tanganyika
- Party: CCM
- Education: Tabora Railways College (Cert)

Innocent Edward Kalogeris (born 3 March 1959) is a Tanzanian CCM politician and Member of Parliament for Morogoro South constituency since 2010.
