= Kulikoyela Kahigi =

Tanzanian politician

Honourable Prof. Kulikoyela Kahigi MP

Member of Parliament for Bukombe
- Incumbent
- Assumed office November 2010
- Preceded by: Emmanuel Luhahula

Personal details
- Born: 4 August 1950 (age 76) Tanganyika
- Party: CHADEMA
- Education: University of Dar es Salaam; Michigan State University (PhD)

Prof. Kulikoyela Kanalwanda Kahigi (born 4 August 1950) is a Tanzanian CHADEMA politician and was a Member of Parliament for Bukombe constituency during 2010 - 2015. He is now back at the University of Dar es Salaam, teaching Linguistics in the Institute of Kiswahili Studies.
