= Albert Ntabaliba =

Tanzanian politician

Honourable Albert Ntabaliba Obama MP

Member of Parliament for Manyovu
- In office November 2010 – 2015

Personal details
- Born: 1965-03-23
- Party: CCM

Honourable Albert Ntabaliba Obama MP

Member of Parliament for Buhigwe
- Incumbent
- Assumed office 2015

Personal details
- Born: 1965-03-23
- Party: CCM

Albert Ntabaliba is a Tanzanian CCM politician and Member of Parliament for Manyovu constituency since 2010. before his term in that constituency ended and he became the member of parliament for Buhigwe in 2015.

== Education ==
Alberts early education was at the Nyamasovu Primary School (1975-1981) where he attained a CPEE and the Kazima Secondary School & Umbwe High School respectively (1982-1985 & 1986-1989) where he received a CSEE & ACSEE.

For further education he went to University of Dar es Salaam between 1990-1993 and attained a Bachelor Degree in B/Com - Finance, from 2000-2001 he attained a certificate in Procurement and Logistics from Sandwell College.
