= Gosbert Blandes =

Tanzanian politician

Honourable Gosbert Blandes MP

Member of Parliament for Karagwe
- Incumbent
- Assumed office December 2005
- Preceded by: George Kahama

Personal details
- Born: 18 February 1963 (age 63) Karagwe District, Kagera Region, Tanganyika
- Party: CCM
- Education: University of Dar es Salaam

Gosbert Begumisa Blandes (born 18 February 1963) is a Tanzanian CCM politician and Member of Parliament for Karagwe constituency since 2005.
