= Mahadhi Maalim =

Tanzanian politician

Ambassador Dr. Mahadhi Maalim MP

Deputy Minister of Foreign Affairs and International Cooperation
- In office 28 November 2010 – 5 November 2015
- Minister: Bernard Membe

Member of Parliament for Muyuni
- In office November 2010 – November 2015
- Preceded by: Haji Mwita Haji

Personal details
- Born: 28 March 1972 (age 54) Zanzibar
- Party: CCM
- Education: UDSM (LL.B); University of Cape Town (LL.M); University of Auckland (LL.M); University of Dar es Salaam (Ph.D).
- Profession: Lawyer

Mahadhi Juma Maalim (born 28 March 1972) is a Tanzanian CCM politician and Member of Parliament for Muyuni constituency from November 2010 to October 2015. He is the former Deputy Minister of Foreign Affairs and International Co-operation. He was an Ambassador of the United Republic of Tanzania to the State of Kuwait and is currently Ambassador of the United Republic of Tanzania to the State of Qatar

== Honours and awards ==
=== Honorary degrees ===
- University of Dar es Salaam, November 2013
