= Jaddy Simai Jaddy =

Tanzanian politician

Honourable Jaddy Simai Jaddy MP

Member of Parliament for Mkwajuni
- Incumbent
- Assumed office November 2010

Personal details
- Born: 30 June 1963 (age 63)
- Party: CCM
- Education: Taras Shevchenko University

Jaddy Simai Jaddy (born 30 June 1963) is a Tanzanian CCM politician and Member of Parliament for Mkwajuni constituency since 2010.
