= Idd Azzan =

Tanzanian politician

Honourable Idd Azzan MP

Member of Parliament for Kinondoni
- In office December 2005 – 2015
- Preceded by: Peter Kabisa
- Succeeded by: Maulid Mtulia

Personal details
- Born: 8 July 1965 (age 60)
- Party: CCM

Idd Mohamed Azzan (born 8 July 1965) is a Tanzanian CCM politician and Member of Parliament for Kinondoni constituency from 2005 to 2015.
