= Henry Shekifu =

Tanzanian politician

Honourable Dr Henry Daffa Shekifu MP

Member of Parliament for Lushoto
- In office 1995 – October 25th 2015
- Preceded by: Abdi Mshangama
- Succeeded by: Shaban Shekilindi

Regional Commissioner of Mtwara
- In office 2005–2007
- Preceded by: Anatoli A. Tarimo
- Succeeded by: Halima Dendegu

Regional Commissioner of Manyara
- In office 2007 – October 25th 2010
- Preceded by: Anatoli A. Tarimo
- Succeeded by: Joel Bendera

Chairperson of CCM(Tanga Region)
- In office 2012–2022

Member of National Executive Committee (NEC) of CCM
- In office 2012–2022

Personal details
- Born: 16 June 1947 (age 79) Tanganyika, Tanzania
- Party: CCM (1977–present)
- Children: 2
- Education: Doctor of Philosophy California State University

Henry Daffa Shekifu (born June 1946) is a Tanzanian CCM politician and was Member of Parliament for Lushoto constituency from 1995 to 2015 and Regional Commissioner of Mtwara and Manyara from 2005 to 2010.
