= Muhammad Chomboh =

Tanzanian politician

Honourable Muhammad Chomboh MP

Member of Parliament for Magomeni Constituency
- Incumbent
- Assumed office December 2005

Personal details
- Born: 25 January 1953 (age 73) Sultanate of Zanzibar
- Party: CCM
- Education: Institute of Finance Management

Muhammad Amour Chomboh (born 25 January 1953) is a Tanzanian CCM politician and Member of Parliament for Magomeni Constituency since 2005.
