= Omari Nundu =

Tanzanian politician (1948–2019)

Honourable Omari Nundu MP

Minister of Transport
- In office 28 November 2010 – 7 May 2012
- President: Jakaya Kikwete
- Succeeded by: Harrison Mwakyembe

Member of Parliament for Tanga City
- Incumbent
- Assumed office November 2010
- Preceded by: Harith Mwapachu

Personal details
- Born: 6 August 1948 Tanganyika Territory
- Died: 11 September 2019 (aged 71)
- Party: CCM
- Education: Glasgow University (BSc); Cranfield University (MSc)

Omari Rashid Nundu (6 August 1948 – 11 September 2019) was a Tanzanian CCM politician and Member of Parliament for Tanga City constituency since 2010 to 2015.
