= Hamad Ali Hamad =

Tanzanian politician

Honourable Hamad Ali Hamad MP

Member of Parliament for Magogoni
- Incumbent
- Assumed office November 2010
- Preceded by: Vuai Khamis

Personal details
- Born: 27 November 1964 (age 61) Zanzibar
- Party: CUF

Hamad Ali Hamad (born 27 November 1964) is a Tanzanian CUF politician and Member of Parliament for Magogoni constituency since 2010.
