= Michael Laizer =

Tanzanian politician

Honourable Michael Laizer MP

Member of Parliament for Longido
- Incumbent
- Assumed office November 1995

Personal details
- Born: 24 October 1948 (age 77) Longido District, Arusha Region, Tanganyika Territory
- Party: CCM

Michael Lekule Laizer (born 24 October 1948) is a Tanzanian CCM politician and Member of Parliament for Longido constituency since 1995.
