= Kheir Khamis =

Tanzanian politician

Honourable Kheir Khamis MP

Member of Parliament for Kwamtipura
- Incumbent
- Assumed office November 2010

Personal details
- Born: 11 September 1950 (age 76)
- Party: CCM
- Education: Institute of Finance Management

Kheir Ali Khamis (born 11 September 1950) is a Tanzanian CCM politician and Member of Parliament for Kwamtipura constituency since 2010.
