= Lucy Nkya =

Tanzanian politician

Honourable Dr Lucy Nkya MP
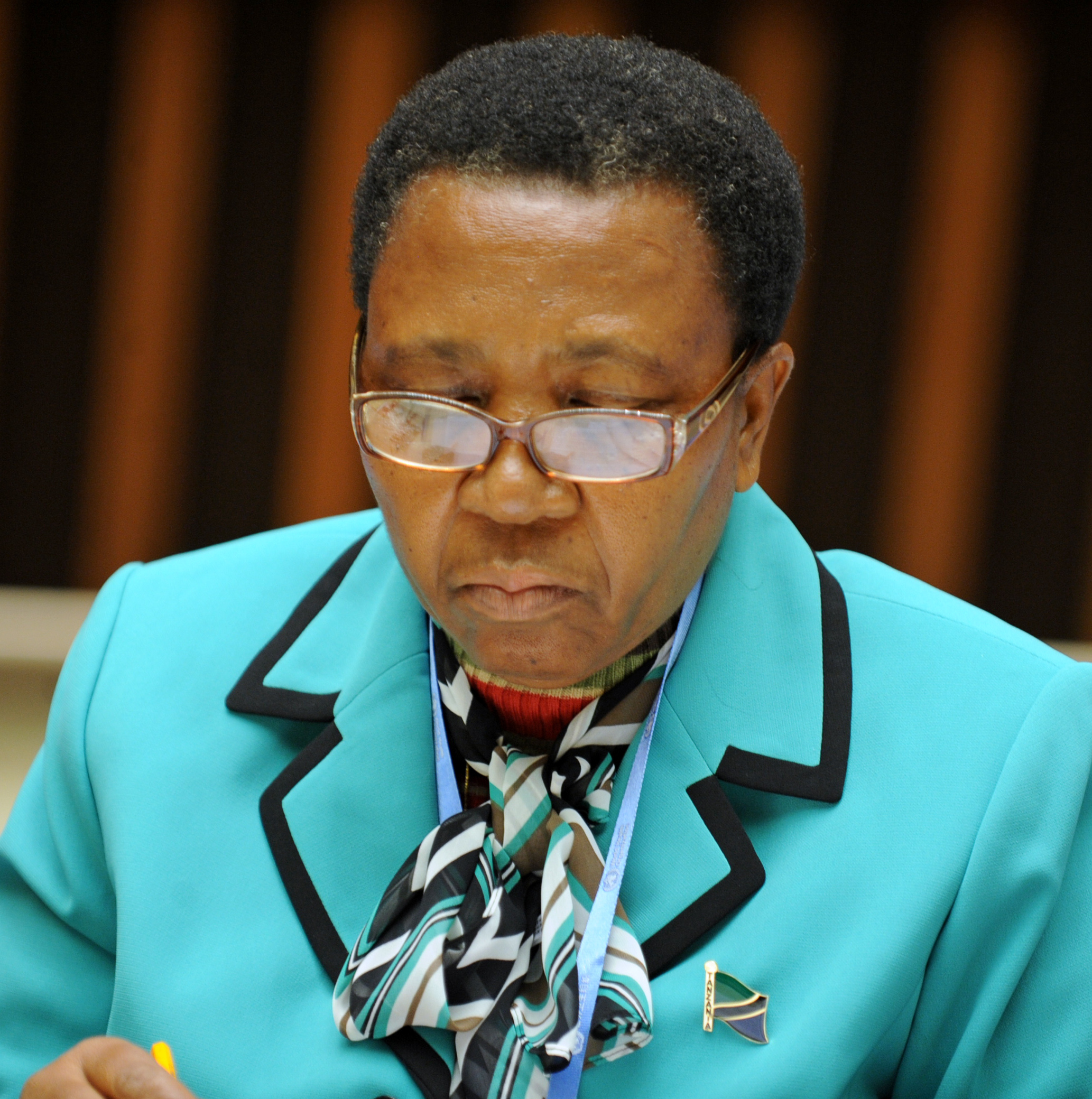

Member of Parliament for Morogoro South East
- Incumbent
- Assumed office November 2010

Personal details
- Born: 10 October 1952 (age 73) Tanganyika
- Party: CCM
- Education: Muhimbili University (BMed); Nairobi University

Military service
- Allegiance: United Rep. of Tanzania
- Branch/service: National Service
- Military camp: Mafinga
- Duration: 1 year

Lucy Sawere Nkya (born 10 October 1952) is a Tanzanian CCM politician and Member of Parliament for Morogoro South East constituency since 2010.
