= Aeshi Hilaly =

Tanzanian politician

Honourable Aeshi Hilaly MP

Member of Parliament for Sumbawanga Town
- Incumbent
- Assumed office November 2010
- Preceded by: Paul Kimiti

Personal details
- Born: 12 December 1973 (age 52) Sumbawanga, Rukwa Region, Tanzania
- Party: CCM

Aeshi Khalfan Hilaly (born 12 December 1973) is a Tanzanian CCM politician and Member of Parliament for Sumbawanga Town constituency since 2010.
