= Salome Mwambu =

Tanzanian politician

Honourable Salome Mwambu MP

Member of Parliament for Iramba East
- Incumbent
- Assumed office November 2010
- Preceded by: Mgana Msindai

Personal details
- Born: 23 May 1954 (age 72)
- Party: CCM
- Education: Mpwapwa TTC (DipEd); University of Dar es Salaam
- Profession: Teacher

Salome Daudi Mwambu (born 23 May 1954) is a Tanzanian CCM politician and Member of Parliament for Iramba East constituency since 2010.
