= Lameck Okambo =

Tanzanian politician

Honourable Lameck Okambo Airo MP

Member of Parliament for Rorya
- Incumbent
- Assumed office November 2010
- Preceded by: Philemon Sarungi

Personal details
- Born: 28 October 1966 (age 59)
- Party: CCM
- Spouse: Rose Lameck Airo
- Children: 6
- Website: www.lakairo.com

Lameck Airo Okambo (born 28 October 1966) is a Tanzanian CCM politician and Member of Parliament for Rorya constituency since 2010. He is the owner and founder of LAKAIRO GROUP, a Tanzania Lake region conglomerate, based in Mwanza.
