= Said Zubeir =

Tanzanian politician (born 1969)

Honourable Said Zubeir MP

Member of Parliament for Fuoni
- Incumbent
- Assumed office November 2010

Personal details
- Born: Said Mussa Zubeir; 25 June 1969 (age 57) Zanzibar
- Party: CCM
- Spouse: Salama Issa Ahmed
- Relations: Married
- Children: Maryam, Iknut, Fereij, Salma, Sleiyum
- Occupation: CEO of Salsa World Wide
- Profession: Politics

Said Mussa Zubeir (born 25 June 1969) is a Tanzanian CCM politician and Member of Parliament for Fuoni constituency since 2010.

Said Zubeir is also the head of the Salsa family in Zanzibar; he and his wife Salama Issa Ahmed are the founders of the Salsa family. Said Zubeir and Salama Issa were married in 1991 in Zanzibar Tanzania. They have a family there which is known as the Salsa family which consists of two parents Said Zubeir, Salama Issa and five children Maryam, Iknut, Fereij and their twins brother and sister Salma and Sleiyum in Zanzibar.

Salsa World Wide Co. General supply

Salsa family owns the Salsa World Wide company in Zanzibar, misk shops in Zanzibar and misk goods transportation agencies in East Africa. Salsa family's net worth is 4.8 million USD.
