= Military ranks of Tanzania =

The Military ranks of Tanzania are the military insignia used by the Tanzania People's Defence Force. Being a former British colony, Tanzania shares a rank structure similar to that of the United Kingdom.

== Current ==
=== Commissioned officer ranks ===
The rank insignia of commissioned officers.

Rank group	General / flag officers				Senior officers			Junior officers
Tanzanian Army
Tanzanian Army	Jenerali	Luteni jenerali	Meja jenerali	Brigedia jenerali	Kanali	Luteni kanali	Meja	Kapteni	Luteni	Luteni usu
Tanzania Naval Command
Tanzania Naval Command		Vice admiral	Rear admiral	Commodore	Captain	Commander	Lieutenant commander	Lieutenant	Sub lieutenant	Ensign
Tanzania Air Force
Tanzania Air Force	Jenerali	Luteni jenerali	Meja jenerali	Brigedia jenerali	Kanali	Luteni kanali	Meja	Kapteni	Luteni	Luteni usu
Rank group	General / flag officers				Senior officers			Junior officers

==== Student officer ranks ====
Rank group	Student officer
Tanzanian Army
Tanzanian Army	Ofisa mteule
Tanzania Naval Command
Tanzania Naval Command	Ofisa mteule
Tanzania Air Force
Tanzania Air Force	Ofisa mteule

=== Other ranks ===
The rank insignia of non-commissioned officers and enlisted personnel.

Rank group	Senior NCOs				Junior NCOs		Enlisted
Tanzanian Army							No insignia
Tanzanian Army	Afisa mteule daraja la kwanza	Afisa mteule daraja la pili	Sajinitaji	Sajenti	Koplo	Koplo usu	Mtu ndege
Tanzania Naval Command							No insignia
Tanzania Naval Command	Afisa mteule daraja la kwanza	Afisa mteule daraja la pili	Sajinitaji	Sajenti	Koplo	Koplo usu	Mtu ndege
Tanzania Air Force							No insignia
Tanzania Air Force	Afisa mteule daraja la kwanza	Afisa mteule daraja la pili	Sajinitaji	Sajenti	Koplo	Koplo usu	Mtu ndege
Rank group	Senior NCOs				Junior NCOs		Enlisted

== Former ==
=== Commissioned officer ranks ===
The rank insignia of commissioned officers.

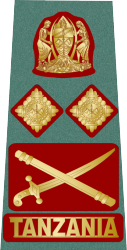
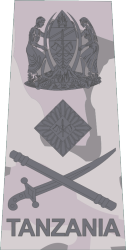
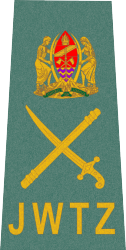
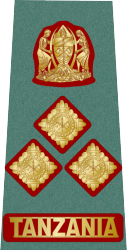
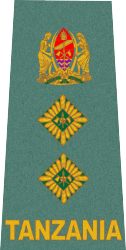
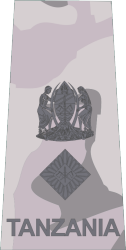
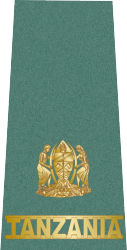
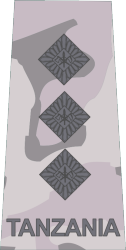
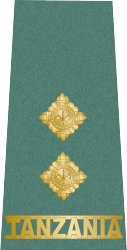
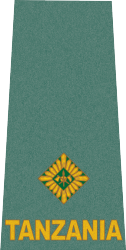
Rank group	General / flag officers				Senior officers			Junior officers
Tanzanian Army (–2015)
Tanzanian Army (–2015)	Jenerali	Luteni jenerali	Meja jenerali	Brigedia jenerali	Kanali	Luteni kanali	Meja	Kapteni	Luteni	Luteni usu	Ofisa mteule
