= College of Business Education =

Public university in Dar es Salaam, Tanzania

Coordinates: 6°48′51.6″S 39°16′52.4″E

- Chuo cha Elimu ya Biashara (Swahili)
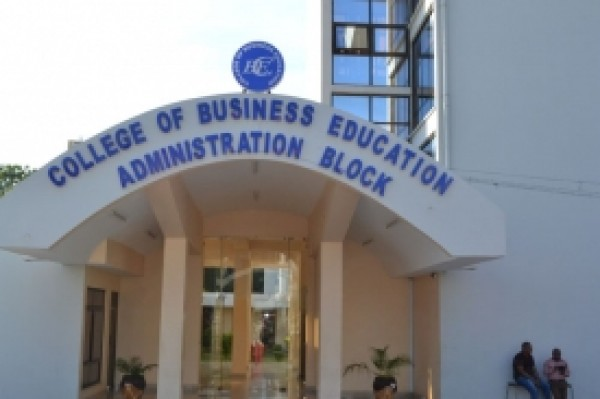
- College of Business Education Administration Block (Main Campus - Dar es Salaam).
- Other name: CBE
- Motto: Leaders in Business Studies.
- Type: Public
- Established: 1965
- Affiliations: University of Eastern Finland, Riga Technical University
- Rector: Prof.Tandi Lwoga (acting)
- Students: 6,740 (2018)
- Location: Dar es Salaam, P.O Box 1968, Dar es Salaam, Tanzania
- Campus: Multiple Sites (Main Campus: Dar es Salaam) (Other Campuses: Dodoma, Mwanza, Mbeya)
- Language: English
- Colours: Blue, white
- Website: www.cbe.ac.tz
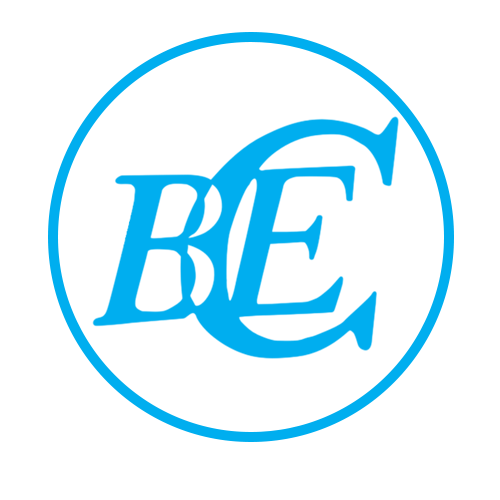

The College of Business Education (CBE) is a higher learning institution in Tanzania established in 1965, registered and accredited by the National Council for Technical Education (NACTE) to offer Certificate, Diploma and Degree Programmes in various fields of study.

== Academic departments ==
The College of Business Education has six academic departments as of 2019:

- Accountancy
- Business Administration
- ICT and Mathematics
- Marketing
- Metrology and Standardization
- Procurement and Supply Management

== Programmes offered ==
Undergraduate and Postgraduate Programmes offered at CBE as of 2019:

=== Undergraduate programs ===
Technician certificate courses (NTA level 4–5)

- Technician Certificate in Accountancy
- Technician Certificate in Business Administration
- Technician Certificate in Marketing Management
- Technician Certificate in Procurement and Supplies Management
- Technician Certificate in Metrology and Standardization (DSM only)
- Technician Certificate in Information Technology

Ordinary diploma courses (NTA level 6)

- Ordinary Diploma in Accountancy
- Ordinary Diploma in Business Administration
- Ordinary Diploma in Marketing
- Ordinary Diploma in Procurement and Supplies Management
- Ordinary Diploma in Metrology and Standardization (DSM Only)
- Ordinary Diploma in Information Technology

bachelor's degree courses (three years) (NTA level 7–8)

- Bachelor's degree in Accountancy (BACC)
- Bachelor's degree in Business Administration (BBA)
- Bachelor's degree in Marketing (BMK)
- Bachelor's degree in Procurement and Supplies Management (BPS)
- Bachelor's degree in Metrology and Standardization (BMET)
- Bachelor's degree in Business Studies with Education (BBSE)
- Bachelor's degree in Information Technology (BIT)

=== Postgraduate programmes ===
Postgraduate diploma courses

- Postgraduate Diploma in Project Management (PGDPM)
- Postgraduate Diploma in Business Administration (PGDBA)
- Postgraduate Diploma in Financial Management (PGDFM)

Masters courses

- Masters for Information Technology in Project Management (IT-Project Management)
- Masters of Information and Communication Technology for Development (ICT4D)
- Masters of Supply Chain Management (MSCM)
- Masters of International Business Management (MIBM)
- Masters of Business Administration in Finance and Banking
- Masters of Business Administration in Human Resource Management
- Masters of Business Administration in Marketing Management

== Rankings ==
In 2018, The Webometrics Ranking placed CBE on the 21st rank in the best Universities and Colleges in Tanzania. In 2019, CBE was ranked 15th in the best Universities and Colleges in Tanzania and it was also ranked 2nd in the best Colleges in Tanzania after Nelson Mandela African Institute of Science & Technology (NM-AIST).
