= Msalala District =

District in Shinyanga, Tanzania

Msalala
- District
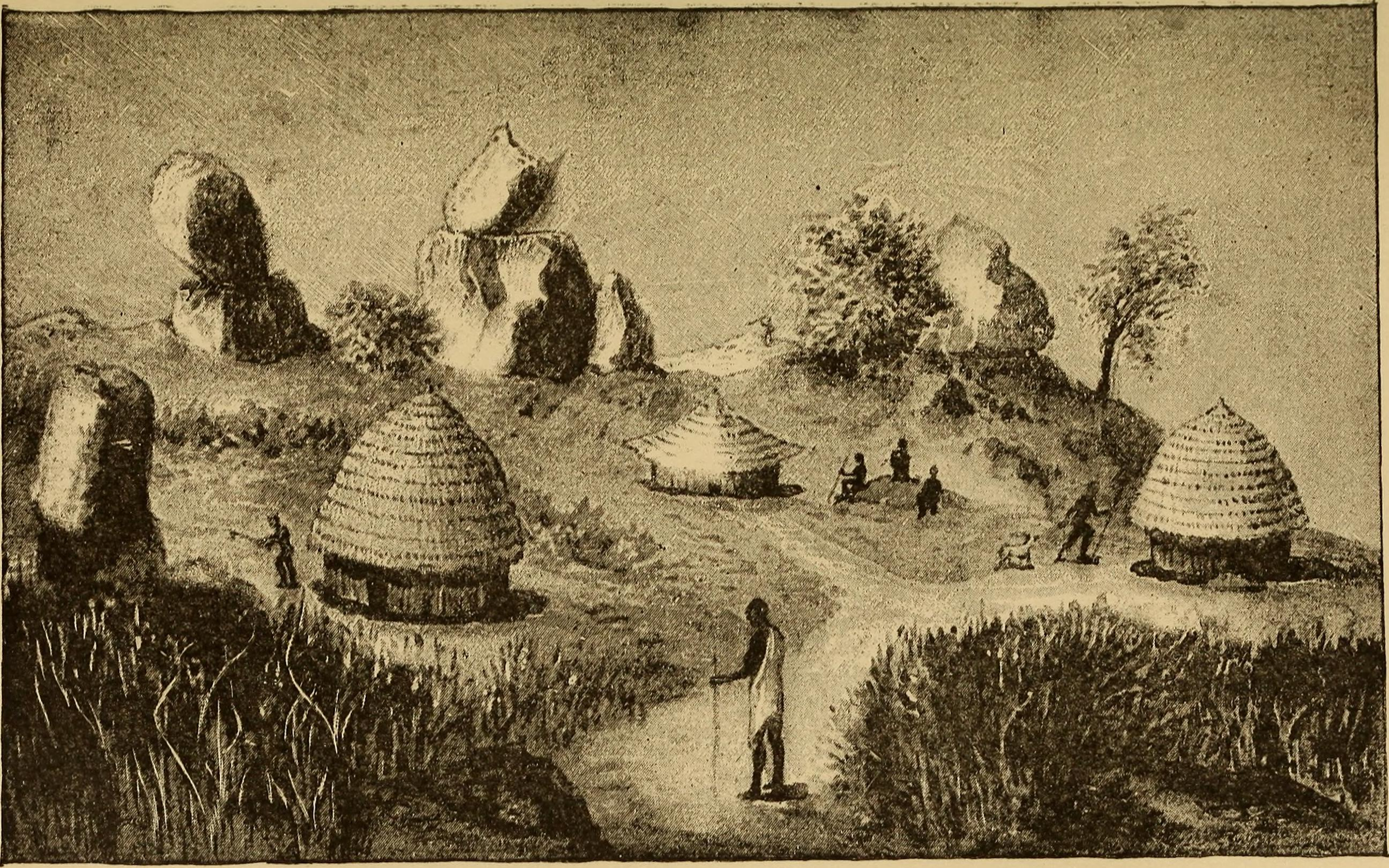
- Drawing of Urima village from 1883

- Msalala District location in the Shinyanga Region
- Coordinates: 3.596°S 32.445°E
- Country: Tanzania
- Region: Shinyanga Region
- District: Msalala District
- Established: 2013
- Headquarters: Masabi, Mega

Government
  - Type: Council
  - Chairman: Mibako Mabubu
  - Director: Edward Charles Fussi

Area
  - Total: 2,635.52 km^{2} (1,017.58 sq mi)

Population (2022)
  - Total: 378,214
  - Density: 143.506/km^{2} (371.680/sq mi)
- Time zone: UTC+3 (EAT)
- Postcode: 37xxx
- Area code: 028
- Website: District Website

Msalala District is a district council in the Shinyanga Region of Tanzania's lake zone established in 2012. The district lies in the middle of the region just north-east of the town of Kahama.

== History ==
The district was created in 2012 by splitting the Kahama District into two new councils of Msalala District and Ushetu District.

== Geography ==
Msalala district lies in the middle of the Shinyanga Region between the Shinyanga District in the east, and Kahama Town in the west. To the north of the district is the Geita Region, and to the south the Tabora Region. The district covers an area of 2,635.52 square kilometres (1,017.58 sq mi).

=== Climate ===
The districts climate is hot semi-arid with the BSh Koppen-Geiger system classification. The average temperature is 24.2 °C (75.6 °F) with an average rainfall of 624 millimetres (24.6 in).

=== Administrative divisions ===
Msalala has one division, 18 wards, and 92 villages.

Wards (2016 population)

- Bugarama (19,839)
- Bulige (11,407)
- Bulyan' hulu (27,504)
- Busangi (12,495)
- Chela (22,542)
- Ikinda (7,376)
- Isaka (14,426)
- Jana (17,481)
- Kashishi (14,561)
- Lunguya (13,588)
- Mega (10,823)
- Mwakata (9,125)
- Mwalugulu (19,604)
- Mwanase (16,177)
- Ngaya (13,770)
- Ntobo (10,955)
- Segese (19,940)
- Shilela (10,636)

== Demographics ==
In 2016 the Tanzania National Bureau of Statistics report there were 272,249 people in the district, from 250,727 in 2012. People of the district are of the tribes of Wasukuma, Wasumbwa, and Wanyamwezi with small populations of Waha, Wahangaza and Wadakama.

== Economy ==
Msalala's economy is primarily agriculture. Primary crops are rice, maize, lentils, peanuts, and cotton. There are many large gold and diamond mines in and near the district such as Bulyanhulu Gold Mine, Buzwagi Gold Mine, and the Williamson diamond mine.

== Education ==
The district has 96 primary schools and 17 secondary schools.

== Health ==
Msalala has 4 health centers and 28 clinics. In 2018, 143,203 (52%) of the population had safe and reliable clean water.

== Infrastructure ==
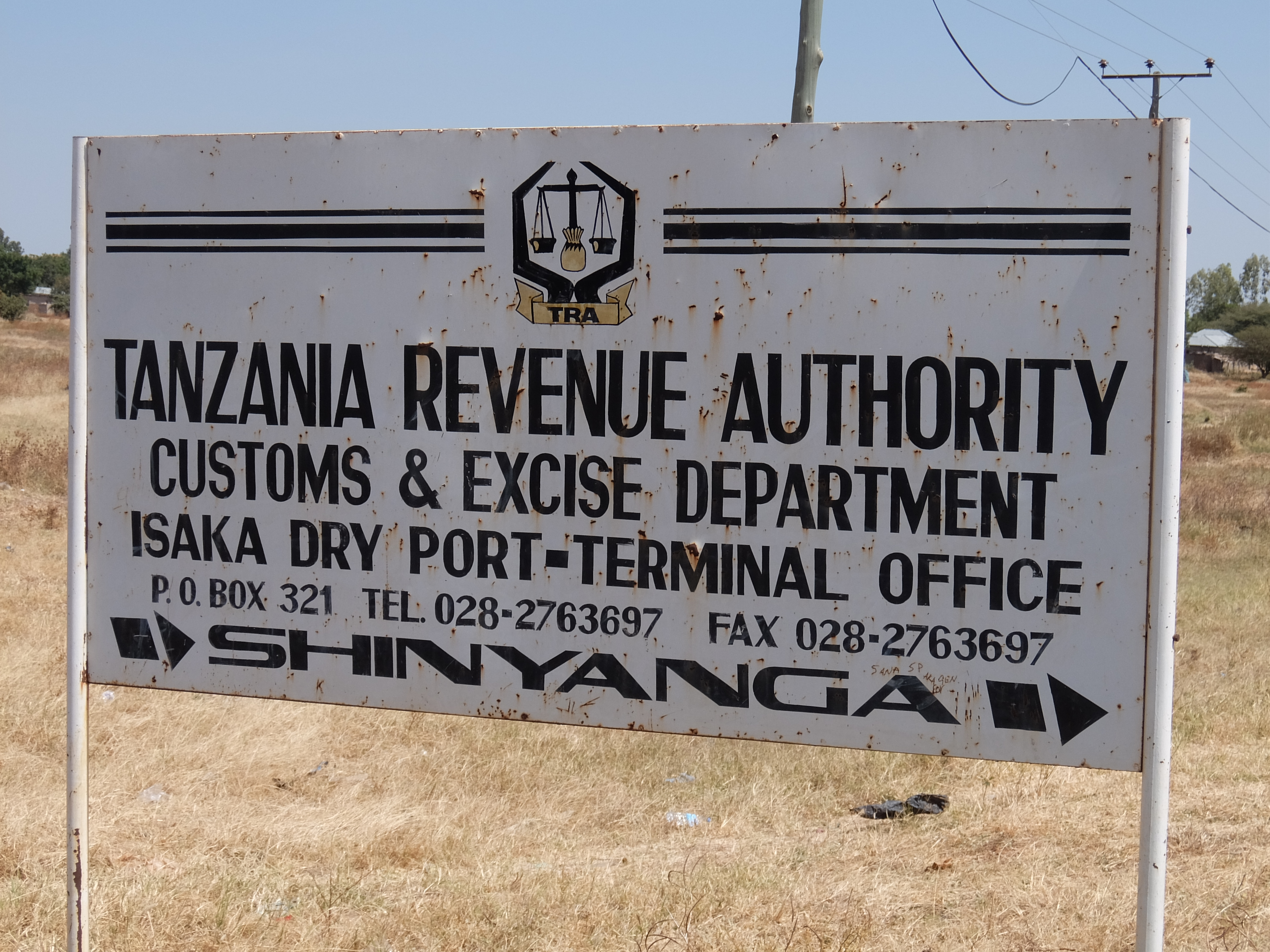
Isaka Dry Port

=== Roads ===
Masala District has 25 square kilometres (9.7 sq mi) of paved road, 205 km^{2} (79 sq mi) of gravel road, and 485 km^{2} (187 sq mi) of dirt road for a total road network of 715 km^{2} (276 sq mi). A paved national trunk road that runs between the city of Shinyanga and town of Kahama through Isaka, and southern part of the district, near the border with the Tabora Region.

=== Rail ===
A metre-gauge railway of the Mwanza branch of Central Line runs through the district with a station in Isaka. A second new standard-gauge railway of the Tanzania Standard Gauge Railway line is currently being built that will also have a station in Isaka. Isaka is the end point of phase 3 and starting point of phase 4 of the Tanzania SGR project. The phase 3 (lot 2) between Isaka and Tabora was awarded in July, 2022 and began construction in August 2022, while the phase 4 between Isaka and Mwanza began construction in 2021.
