= Kishapu Solar Power Station =

Solar farm in Tanzania

- Country: Tanzania
- Location: Kishapu District, Shinyanga Region
- Coordinates: 03°38′11″S 33°42′07″E
- Status: Proposed
- Construction began: March 2022 Expected
- Commission date: March 2023 Expected
- Construction cost: €130 million
- Owner: TANESCO
- Operator: TANESCO

Solar farm
- Type: Flat-panel PV

Power generation
- Nameplate capacity: 50 MW (67,000 hp) expandable to 150 MW (200,000 hp)
- Annual net output: 91.6 GWh

The Kishapu Solar Power Station is a proposed 50 MW (67,000 hp) solar power plant in Tanzania. The power station is under development by Tanzania Electric Supply Company Limited (TANESCO), the national electricity monopoly utility company. The energy will be integrated into the national grid, also operated by TANESCO. The solar farm will be developed in phases to capacity of 150 megawatts. When completed and commissioned, it will be the largest, grid-ready solar power station in the country.

== Location ==
The power station would be located in the Kishapu District, in the Shinyanga Region of Tanzania. The town of Kishapu, which is the district headquarters, is located approximately 58 kilometres (36 mi), east of Shinyanga, the regional capital. Kishapu is located approximately 536 kilometres (333 mi) northwest of Dodoma, the capital city of Tanzania. The solar farm is bordered on one side by the 220 kV Singida–Shinyanga High Voltage Power Line.

== Overview ==
The power station, which will be developed in phases, has a maximum generation capacity of the first phase of 50 megawatts. The solar farm helps Tanzania diversify its electricity generation mix with clean carbon dioxide-free energy. Another objective is the modernization of the TANESCO grid. A new "National Grid Control Center" will be established in Dodoma. A "Distribution Control Center with a Distribution Management System" will also be installed in key urban locations, including Arusha, Dodoma, Mbeya and Mwanza. The energy generated a this power station is expected to "stabilize the grid and reduce technical losses".

== Funding and timeline ==
The French Development Agency (AFD) lent €130 million for the solar power station. AFD also granted an extra €700,000 for grid modernization and technical loss reduction. Construction of the first phase of Kishapu Solar Power Plant is expected to start in March 2022 and conclude approximately one year later. Phase II will follow after that.

== See also ==
- List of power stations in Tanzania
