= Ushetu District =

District in Shinyanga, Tanzania

Ushetu
- District
- Ushetu District location in the Shinyanga Region
- Coordinates: 4.1068°S 32.405°E
- Country: Tanzania
- Region: Shinyanga Region
- District: Ushetu District
- Established: 23 November 2012
- Headquarters: Kisuke

Government
  - Type: Council
  - Chairman: Gagi Lala Gagi
  - Director: Linno Pius Mwageni

Area
  - Total: 5,311 km^{2} (2,051 sq mi)
  - Water: 22 km^{2} (8.5 sq mi)

Population (2016)
  - Total: 296,515
  - Density: 55.83/km^{2} (144.6/sq mi)
- Time zone: UTC+3 (EAT)
- Postcode: 37xxx
- Area code: 028
- Website: District Website

Ushetu District is a district council in the Shinyanga Region of Tanzania's lake zone established in 2012. The district lies in west most portion of the region just south and west of the town of Kahama.

== History ==
The district was created on 23 November 2012 by splitting the Kahama District into one new town council of Kahama Municipality, and two new district councils of Msalala District and Ushetu District. The official inauguration of the district was on 1 July 2013.

== Geography ==
The district lies in the west of the Shinyanga Region to the south and east of Kahama Town. To the north-east of the district is Kahama Town of the Shinyanga Region the north is Mbogwe District and west Bukombe District both of the Geita Region. To the east and south is the Tabora Region with the Nzega District to the east, and Uyui District and Kaliua District to the south from east to west respectively. The district covers an area of 5,311 square kilometres (2,051 sq mi) of which only 22 km^{2} (8.5 sq mi) is water.

=== Climate ===
The districts climate is tropical savanna climate with the Aw Koppen-Geiger system classification. The average temperature is 23 °C (73 °F) with an average rainfall of 973 millimetres (38.3 in).

=== Administrative divisions ===
The district has the two division of Mweli and Dakama, 20 wards, and 112 villages.

Wards (2016 population)

- Bukomela (7,049)
- Bulungwa (26,757)
- Chambo (15,762)
- Chona (20,067)
- Idahina (25,992)
- Igunda (7,163)
- Igwamanoni (16,180)
- Kinamapula (13,785)
- Kisuke (5,114)
- Mapamba (6,811)
- Mpunze (10,140)
- Nyamilangano (6,251)
- Nyankende (15,761)
- Sabasabini (12,556)
- Ubagwe (17,997)
- Ukune (12,723)
- Ulewe (19,880)
- Ulowa (20,881)
- Ushetu (19,043)
- Uyogo (16,604)

== Demographics ==
In 2016 the Tanzania National Bureau of Statistics report there were 296,515 people in the district, from 273,075 in 2012. People of the district are of the tribes of Wasukuma, Wasumbwa, and Wanyamwezi with small populations of Waha, and Wahangaza.

In 2012, the district had 43,497 households of 6 to 7 people and yearly population growth rate of 3.3%.

== Economy ==
The Ushetu District has 2,149 square kilometres (830 sq mi) of agricultural land, which predominantly used to grow maize, cotton and rice. There is 1,044.4 km^{2} (403.2 sq mi) of grazing land that is used mostly by cattle and goats, as well as a small number of sheep.

The district has 2,110 square kilometres (810 sq mi) of forest reserve for forestry, also which includes 900 km^{2} (350 sq mi) of protected areas such as the Kigosi National Park which can be used for beekeeping and tourism.

== Education ==
There are 102 primary schools, and 18 secondary schools in Ushetu District.

== Health ==
The district has one hospital, three health care centers, and 25 dispensaries. In 2019, 165,111 (56%) of the population had access to safe, clean, and reliable water.

== Roads ==
There are no paved roads, or national roads in the district. There are 221 kilometres (137 mi) of gravel, and 664 km (413 mi) of dirt roads, for a 885 km (550 mi) road network.
