= Petra Diamonds =

Jersey diamond mining company

- Type: Public
- Traded as: LSE: PDL
- Industry: Diamond mining
- Founded: 1997
- Headquarters: Jersey
- Key people: Peter Hill, Chairman; Richard Duffy, CEO
- Products: Diamonds
- Revenue: ▼US$207 million (2025)
- Operating income: ▼US$(182) million (2025)
- Net income: ▼US$(116) million (2025)
- Website: petradiamonds.com

Petra Diamonds Ltd is a diamond mining group headquartered in Jersey. Petra own one of the world's most productive mines historically, the Cullinan Diamond Mine is famed for having produced the world's largest rough and polished diamond. It has the world's third-largest resource of diamonds. The company is listed on the London Stock Exchange.

== History ==
Petra Diamonds was founded by Adonis Pouroulis in 1997 and was first listed on the Alternative Investment Market later that year. It transferred to the Main Market in December 2011.

In October 2026, the company confirmed that one of its subsidiaries faced compulsary winding up after failure to pay £5.65 million in corporation tax. The company also confirmed that, as a result of cash flow pressures, it was seeking to refinance its debts. The company's listing on the London Stock Exchange was suspended on 2 November 2026 after it failed to publish its financial stastements on time.

== Operations ==
Petra Diamonds' operations are focused in Africa:

=== South Africa ===
Petra Diamonds operates three producing diamond mines in South Africa. These are all underground kimberlite pipe mines (Cullinan, Finsch and Koffiefontein).

==== Finsch Mine ====
Finsch diamond mine is one of the world's most important diamond mines and South Africa's second largest diamond operation by production. On 14 September 2011, Petra purchased Finsch as a fully staffed, operating mine from De Beers for a total consideration of ZAR1.4 billion. Finsch is a major producer, having supplied over 126 million carats in its 40 plus year life to date. Petra is currently implementing a development plan to lift production from ca. 1.4 million carats per annum to 1.9 million carats per annum by FY 2017 (involving both underground and tailings production).

==== Cullinan Mine ====
In July 2008, Petra led a consortium which acquired the Cullinan diamond mine from De Beers Consolidated Mines for a total cash consideration of ZAR1 billion. In line with the South African Mining Charter, the Petra Diamonds Cullinan Consortium included broad based Black Economic Empowerment partners.

The Cullinan kimberlite pipe is the second largest indicated diamond resource in the world by in-situ value. The current operating levels include the B-Cut at a depth of 747 metres, and beneath that lies the Centenary-Cut ("the C-Cut"), a world class diamond resource. The mine hosts a total resource of 202.1 million carats, including 16.5 million carats in tailings dumps.

The mine, previously known as Premier Diamond mine, is renowned for producing many of the world's largest and most famous diamonds, including the Cullinan Diamond, the world's largest gem diamond, at 3,106 carats (0.6212 kg) rough. Sir Thomas Cullinan, the former chairman of the Premier Diamond Mine, presented the Cullinan to England's King Edward VII in 1905. The Great Star of Africa, which sits in the Sceptre of the Crown Jewels, was produced from the Cullinan Diamond, and was until recently acknowledged to be the largest cut diamond in the world, weighing in at 530.20 carats (106.040 g). In 1985 it lost the record to the Golden Jubilee, which was found in the same mine as the Cullinan and weighed 545.67 carats (109.134 g) in its polished state. More than a quarter of all diamonds weighing more than 400 carats (80 g) have originated from Cullinan. It is also the world's only significant source of blue diamonds. One of these famous large blue diamonds was cut into several stones and made into a necklace which subsequently became known as the Cullinan Blue Diamond necklace.

The Cullinan mine continues to produce large stones. The Cullinan Heritage, a 507-carat (101.4 g) white diamond, was discovered in September 2009. This stone was the 19th biggest uncut diamond ever found and was sold in February 2010 to Chow Tai Fook Jewellery for $35.5m, the highest price ever paid for an uncut diamond. The previous record was held by Gem Diamonds' Leseli La Letšeng, which was bought for $18.4m by Graff Diamonds in December 2008.

==== Koffiefontein ====
Koffiefontein mine is one of the world’s top diamond mines by average value per carat and produces exceptional white and coloured diamonds, a regular proportion of which are of between 5 and 30 carats. In 1994, a 232.34 carat diamond was recovered at Koffiefontein, being the largest rough diamond ever produced by the mine.

Diamonds were first discovered on the Koffiefontein farm in 1870. Mining started in the form of small claims that were later amalgamated into Koffiefontein Mine Limited. De Beers acquired control of Koffiefontein Mine Limited in 1911. Mining operations were then continuous until the advent of the Great Depression in 1932 when work was suspended. Between 1950 and 1953, a prospecting shaft was sunk which was followed by limited production. The mine was reopened in 1970 and preparations for increased production were completed in August 1971. Immediately after completing the preparations, production from the open pit commenced and proceeded to a depth of 270 metres. Underground development started in 1974 through a sampling programme. Underground production briefly took place in 1982 but ceased soon thereafter due to the 1981 slump in the diamond market. These operations were resumed in March 1987. During the period 1972 to the end of 2004, approximately 69.5 million tonnes of kimberlite ore were mined and 6.1 million carats of diamonds were recovered. In February 2006, De Beers ceased mining when the old order mining right for Koffiefontein expired and in July of that year Petra Diamonds commenced operating the mine under care and maintenance conditions. The acquisition of the mine was completed in July 2007 and Petra Diamonds was subsequently able to commence diamond recoveries by starting to process the stockpile through the plant.

=== Tanzania ===
Petra agreed to acquire the Williamson Mine in Tanzania in September 2008 from De Beers and completed the acquisition in February 2009. The Williamson mine, which was discovered in 1940, has a reputation for the production of large, high value diamonds, with special stones (classified as larger than 10.8 carats (2.16 g)) produced regularly. The mine is also famed for its pink diamonds. In 1947, the mine's founder Dr. John Williamson presented Princess Elizabeth (later Elizabeth II) with a flawless 54-carat (10.8 g) pink diamond (the Williamson Pink Diamond) on her wedding day. The eventual 23.6-carat (4.72 g) cut diamond became the centre stone in the Williamson Diamond brooch and is supposedly the basis for the Pink Panther diamond in the film of the same name.

The Williamson Mine currently has a resource of 39.6 million carats (8,000 kg) (984 million tonnes of kimberlite). It has an average mining depth of 65 metres (90m at the deepest point) and a very low stripping ratio. Energy and Minerals Minister William Ngeleja said Petra's entry is "an opportunity to breathe new life into Williamson Mine and Tanzania's diamond mining sector."

== See also ==
- Diamonds as an investment
