= Kahama Rural District =

- District
- Kahama Rural's location within Shinyanga Region. Trunk roads in green.
- Coordinates: 03°50′S 032°35′E
- Country: Tanzania
- Region: Shinyanga Region

Population (2012)
  - Total: 523,802

Kahama Rural District is one of the five districts of the Shinyanga Region of Tanzania. Its administrative centre is the town of Kahama. The district consists of two separate parts, divided by Kahama Urban District. The area to the northeast is Msalala District, while the part to the southwest is Ushetu Council.

According to the 2012 Tanzania National Census, the population of the Kahama Rural District was 523,802.

== Transport ==
Paved Trunk road T3 from Morogoro to the Rwanda border passes through Kahama Rural District from east to west.

There is a train station and a dry port at the town of Isaka, on the stretch of Mwanza railway line going from Tabora to Shinyanga.

== Wards ==
As of 2012, Kahama Rural District was administratively divided into 35 wards.

- Bugarama
- Bukomela
- Bulige
- Bulungwa
- Bulyanhulu
- Busangi
- Chambo
- Chela
- Chona
- Idahina
- Igunda
- Igwamanoni
- Isaka
- Jana
- Kashishi
- Kinamapula
- Kisuke
- Lunguya
- Mapamba
- Mega
- Mpunze
- Mwalugulu
- Mwanase
- Ngaya
- Ntobo
- Nyankende
- Sabasabini
- Segese
- Shilela
- Ubagwe
- Ukune
- Ulewe
- Ulowa
- Ushetu
- Uyogo
