= Shinyanga Urban District =

District of Shinyanga Region, Tanzania

Coordinates: 3°40′S 33°30′E

- District
- location within Shinyanga Region.
- Country: Tanzania

Shinyanga Urban District is one of the eight districts of the Shinyanga Region of Tanzania and includes the city of Shinyanga. It is bordered to the north by the Mwanza Region, to the south by the Shinyanga Rural District, to the east by the Kishapu District and to the west by the Kahama Urban District.

According to the 2002 Tanzania National Census, the population of the Shinyanga Urban District was 135,166.

== Wards ==
The Shinyanga Urban District is administratively divided into 17 wards:

- Chamaguha
- Chibe
- Lubaga
- Ibadakuli
- Ibinzamata
- Kambarage
- Kitangili
- Kizumbi
- Nkolandoto
- Mwamalili
- Old Shinyanga
- Mwawaza
- Ndala
- Masekelo
- Ngokolo
- Ndembezi
- Mjini
