= Bukomela =

Ward in Kahama, Shinyanga, Tanzania

Bukomela Kata ya Bukomela
- Ward
- Location within Tanzania Location within Africa
- Coordinates: 4.09°S 32.326°E
- Country: Tanzania
- Region: Shinyanga Region
- District: Kahama Rural District
- Ward: Bukomela

Population (2016)
  - Total: 7,049
- Time zone: UTC+3 (EAT)
- Postcode: 37344

Bukomela is an administrative ward in Kahama Rural District, Shinyanga Region, Tanzania. In 2016 the Tanzania National Bureau of Statistics report there were 7,049 people in the ward, from 6,492 in 2012.

== Villages / vitongoji ==
The ward has 4 villages and 19 vitongoji.

- Bukomela
  - Bukomela Kaskazini
  - Bukomela Kati
  - Bukomela Kusini
  - Mikobe
- Kabila
  - Kabila 'A'
  - Kabila 'B'
  - Ngokolo 'A'
  - Ngokolo 'B'
  - Shijengele
- Mliza
  - Mliza 'A'
  - Mliza 'B'
  - Mliza 'C'
  - Mliza 'D'
- Ngokolo
  - Busulwanguku
  - Iyogelo
  - Kalonge
  - Mlima Chasa
  - Ngokolo 'D'
  - Ngokolo Kati
