= Kahama Ward =

Ward in Kahama, Shinyanga, Tanzania

Kahama Kata ya Kahama
- Ward
- Location within Tanzania Location within Africa
- Coordinates: 3°49′55″S 32°36′37″E
- Country: Tanzania
- Region: Shinyanga Region
- District: Kahama Urban District
- Ward: Kahama

Government
  - Type: District Council
  - District Executive Director: John P. Wanga
  - MP: Angeline Mabula
  - Mayor: Renatus Bahame Mulunga
  - Councilor: Zebron Benard Mkina

Population (2016)
  - Total: 7,189
- Time zone: UTC+3 (EAT)
- Postcode: 37304

Kahama is an administrative ward in Kahama Urban District, Shinyanga Region, Tanzania with a postcode number 37304.In 2016 the Tanzania National Bureau of Statistics report there were 7,189 people in the ward, from 6,621 in 2012.

The ward has 2 neighborhoods Namanga, and Igalilimi.
