= Shinyanga Rural District =

Coordinates: 3.6312°S 33.0972°E

Shinyanga District
- District
- location within Shinyanga Region.
- Country: Tanzania

Area
  - Total: 3,568 km^{2} (1,378 sq mi)

Population (2022)
  - Total: 468,611
  - Density: 131.3/km^{2} (340.2/sq mi)

Shinyanga Rural District is one of the five districts of the Shinyanga Region of Tanzania. It is bordered to the north by the Shinyanga Urban District, to the east by the Kishapu District, to the south by the Tabora Region, and to the west by the Kahama District.

According to the 2022 Tanzania National Census, the population of the Shinyanga Rural District was 468,611.

== Wards ==
The Shinyanga Rural District is administratively divided into 16 wards:

- Didia
- Ilola
- Imesela
- Iselamagazi
- Itwangi
- Lyabukande
- Mwakitolyo
- Mwamala
- Mwantini
- Pandagichiza
- Salawe
- Samuye
- Solwa
- Tinde
- Usanda
- Usule

== Sources ==
- Shinyanga Rural District Homepage for the 2002 Tanzania National Census
