= Kigosi National Park =

Protected area in Tanga Region, Tanzania

Kigosi National Forest Reserve
- IUCN category II (national park)
- Location within Tanzania
- Location: Geita Region, Shinyanga Region & Tabora Region; Tanzania
- Nearest city: Kahama
- Coordinates: 3°53′24″S 31°49′12″E
- Area: 8,265 km^{2} (3,191 mi^{2})
- Designation: Forest reserve
- Established: 2024
- Governing body: Tanzania Forest Services Agency under the Ministry of Natural Resources and Tourism
- Website: Official Page

The Kigosi National Forest Reserve (Hifadhi ya Msitu wa Taifa ya Kigosi, In Swahili) is a Forest Reserve located in Shinyanga Region, Geita Region and northwest Tabora Region of Tanzania. In 2024, Kigosi National Park was downgraded to Forest Reserve. Kigosi National Forest Reserve was established in 2024. It is a part of the Moyowosi/Malagarasi wetlands complex, which is the largest wetlands complex in East Africa, and has an area of 8,265 km2. The Malagarasi, Moyowosi, Nikonga, Ugalla, Kigosi, Nikonga, and Gombe are seven slow-moving rivers that meander through a vast and intricate network of marshes, plains lakes, and woodlands. These rivers should not be confused with the Gombe Stream National Park where the chimpanzees live. These rivers eventually combine to form the Malagarasi River, which empties into Ilagala's Lake Tanganyika. With a total area of almost 92,000 square kilometers, the wetland system is larger than the entire country of Portugal.

== History ==
Formerly Kigosi Game Reserve, the protected area was first established in 1983. Its status was upgraded to National park in 2019. It encompasses an area of 8265 km^{2}.

== Geography ==
The reserve extends from Bukombe and Kahama Districts in Shinyanga Region up to Urambo District in Tabora Region. There are two annual rainfall peaks, in February and November. The dry season starts in mid May and ends in mid October. Annual rainfall varies between 1,000m and 1,500m. It is one of the largest reserves in East Africa with floodplain and wetland ecosystems. This reserve is an important wild animal protection and feeding area during the dry season for migratory animals like waterfowl and large mammal species. The maximum temperature of the area is 29°C.

It is thought to provide close to 30% of Lake Tanganyika's freshwater. The entire region has been declared as a Ramsar site, a wetland of worldwide significance. Kigosi National Park is located in the northeast of the complex, where the Nikonga River joins the Moyowosi wetlands complex and drains the shallow, sloping Miombo woods.

== Fauna ==
The shoebill stork and the wattled crane have their biggest concentrations in Africa here. The largest flocks of pygmy geese in Africa are present. The largest concentrations of Cape clawless otters in Africa can be found in the Moyowosi wetlands. Lion, leopard, buffalo, crocodile, topi, sitatunga, warthog, baboon, zebra, sable, roan, eland, bushbuck, oribi, southern and Bohor reedbuck, hyena, hippo, and Defassa waterbuck also live here. Miombo woodlands surround lakes and marshes, many of which have floating palm and papyrus islands, and grassy flood plains dotted with palm trees.

The lion populations in western Tanzania are well-known, and Kigosi is no exception. The Miombo forests are home to big game in addition to lions. Numerous buffalo, sable, roan, kudu, leopards, and topis are present. Sightings of the elusive, water-loving sitatunga in the south's swamps. For the sitatunga, this is one of the biggest protected areas in East Africa. Waterbuck, hippo, and crocodiles have the ideal habitat in the wet areas. The marshes are also the ideal habitat for rare water birds, such as the great snipe, wattled cranes, and shoebills.
