= Kishapu District =

- District
- location within Shinyanga Region.
- Country: Tanzania

Kishapu District is one of the three districts of the Shinyanga Region of Tanzania. It is bordered to the north by the Maswa District, to the south by the Tabora Region, to the east by the Meatu District and to the west by the Shinyanga Rural and Urban Districts.

The open pit Williamson diamond mine (also known as Mwadui mine) is located in Kishapu District.

According to the 2022 Tanzania National Census, the population of Kishapu District was 335,483.

== Wards ==
Kishapu District is administratively divided into 20 wards:

1. Bubiki
2. Bunambiyu
3. Itilima
4. Kiloleli
5. Kishapu
6. Lagana
7. Masanga
8. Mondo
9. Mwadui Luhumbo
10. Mwakipoya
11. Mwamalasa
12. Mwamashele
13. Ngofila
14. Seke Bugoro
15. Shagihilu
16. Somagedi
17. Songwa
18. Talaga
19. Uchunga
20. Ukenyenge
21. mwataga

== Sources ==
- Kishapu District Homepage for the 2002 Tanzania National Census
