= John Williamson (geologist) =

Canadian geologist

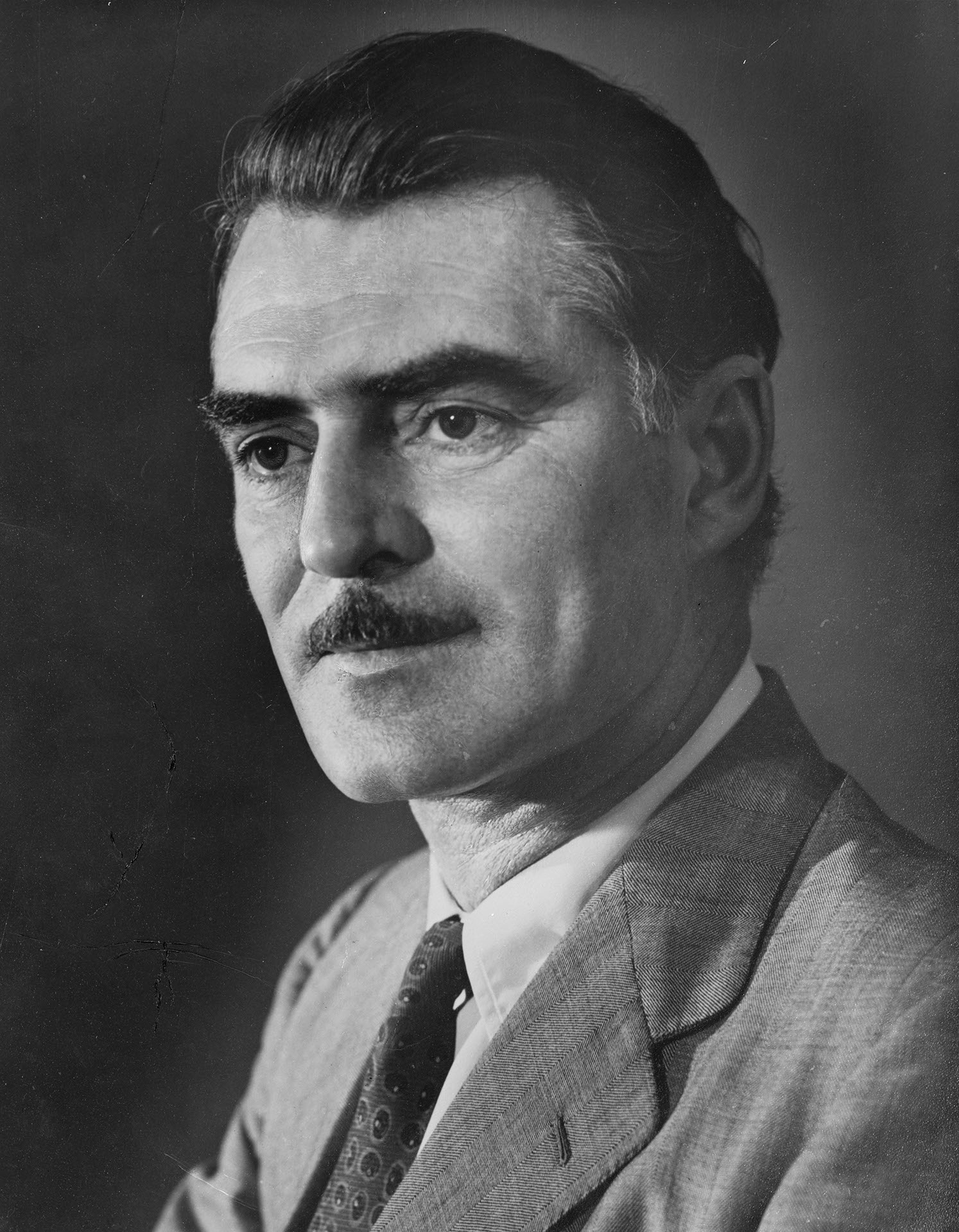
Williamson, 1957

John Thoburn Williamson (1907–1958) was a Canadian geologist famous for establishing the Williamson diamond mine in present-day Tanzania; he was the only man in the 20th century to create his own diamond mine.

== Early life ==
Williamson was born in 1907 in Montfort, Quebec. He attended McGill University, where he initially intended to study law, but became interested in geology after accompanying a friend on a summer field expedition to Labrador in 1926. He subsequently earned bachelor's, master's, and Ph.D. degrees in geology, completing his studies between 1928 and 1933.

== Williamson mine ==
After completing his studies, Williamson travelled to South Africa with one of his professors, where he eventually took a job with Loangwa Concessions, a De Beers subsidiary in what was then Northern Rhodesia (now Zambia). He then moved on to work at the Mabuki diamond mine, which he purchased from the owners in 1936 when they had decided to shut the mine down. Williamson struggled to support himself with the operations of the Mabuki mine, while using it as a base for diamond prospecting in the region. Additional funding came from local lawyer Iqbal Chopra, who partnered with him on his future discovery. In 1940, he discovered the diamond-bearing kimberlite pipe at Mwadui that he would develop over the coming years into the Williamson diamond mine.

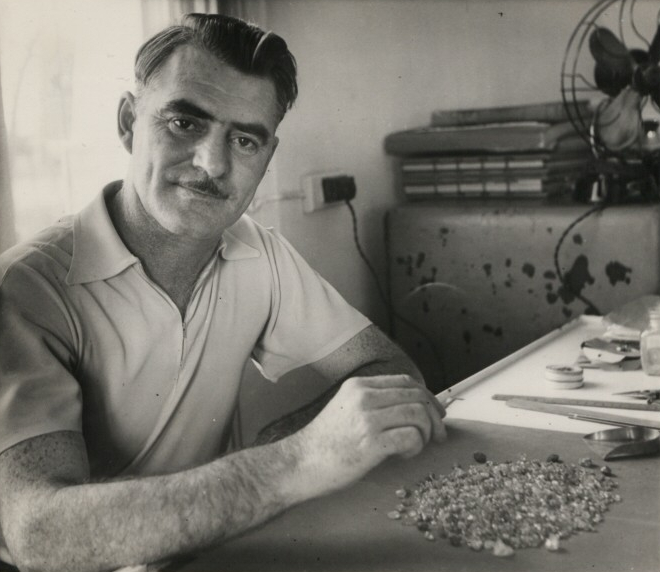
Williamson, 1958

The diamond mine at Mwadui was closely managed by Williamson, who by the 1950s had developed a diamond mining operation renowned for its efficiency and technological innovations. By 1952 the mine was operating at 10,000 tons per day. The mine's production, which Williamson owned in full, made him one of the richest men in the world by the time of his death in 1958 of cancer. The mine, famous for being the first significant diamond mine outside of South Africa, continues to operate today, and the total production from 1941 to 2008 has been estimated at 20 million carats (4,000 kg) of diamonds.

The mine produced many fine gems including the Williamson pink diamond, a pink 54.5 carats (10.90 g) rough diamond presented to Princess Elizabeth and Prince Philip on the occasion of their wedding in 1947. Cut by Cartier to a 23.6 carats (4.72 g) gem, it became the centerpiece of the Williamson Diamond Cartier brooch made for the Queen in 1952.

== Legacy ==
John Williamson was never married; upon his death the mine was left to his three siblings, who promptly sold the mine for £4 million GBP to a partnership between De Beers and the government of Tanzania (then Tanganyika).

The life of John Williamson was adapted into the biographical novel The Diamond Seeker by John Gawaine (a pen name), which was published in 1967. The book depicts Williamson as quiet to the point of secretive, and something of a womanizer. However, it also hails him as the last of the great diamond prospectors, who were able to find meaningful deposits and establish significant, successful mines without outside resources or support. While the book is known to have taken some liberties with the facts, it is one of the few biographical sources available. John Gunther in Inside Africa gives an account of a visit to the mine, describing Williamson as (partly on account of ill health) "an almost total recluse" whose one hobby was collecting first edition books. In 2011 Williamson was inducted into the Canadian Mining Hall of Fame.
