= Williamson diamond mine =

Diamond mine in Tanzania

Williamson diamond mine (Mwadui)
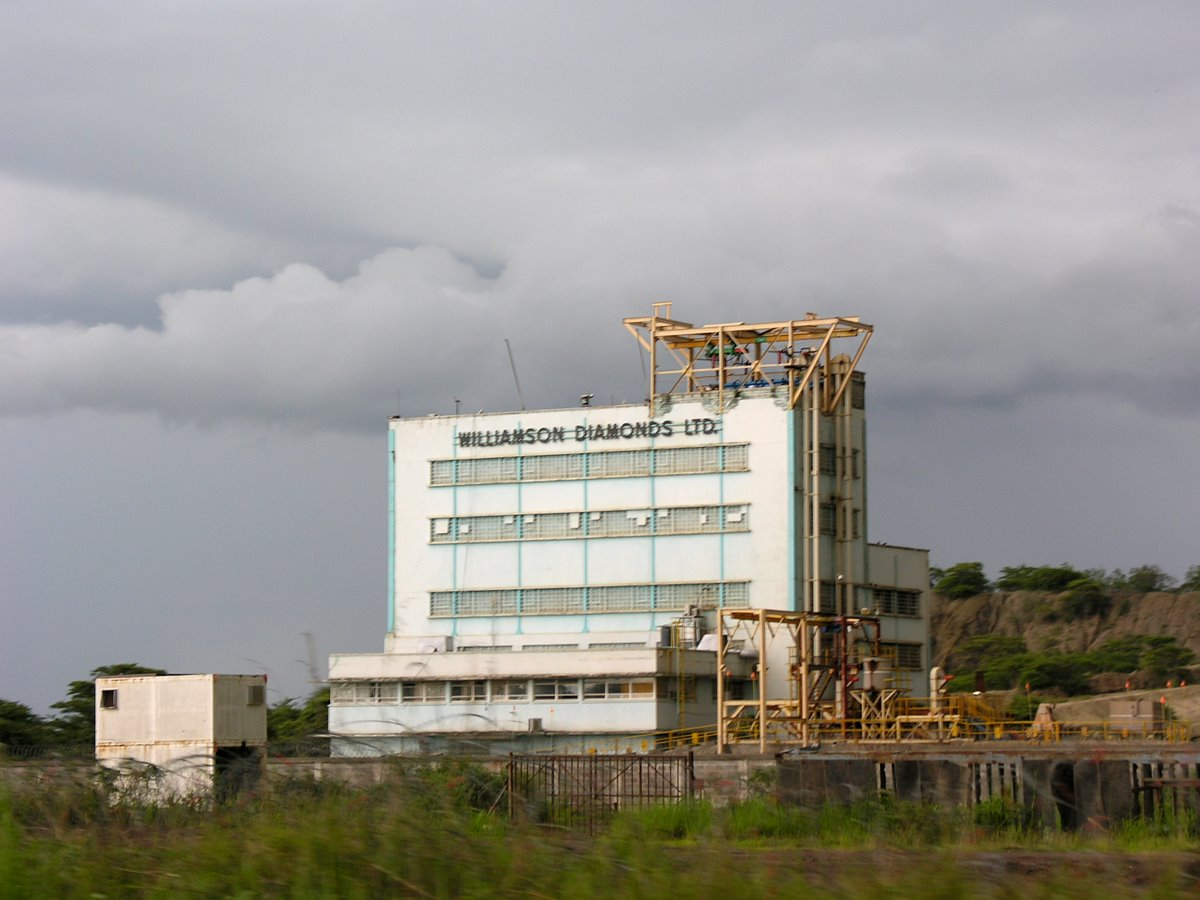
- Williamson Diamonds Limited

- Location in Tanzania Williamson diamond mine (Africa) Williamson diamond mine (Earth)
- Location: Tanzania; 03°31′S 033°36′E
- Products: Diamonds (300,000 carats per annum)
- Opened: 1940
- Company: Petra Diamonds (75%); Government of Tanzania (25%)

The Williamson Diamond Mine (also known as the Mwadui mine) is a diamond mine 23 kilometres (14 mi) northeast of Shinyanga in Tanzania; it became well known as the first significant diamond mine outside of South Africa. The kimberlite pipe was found in March 1940 and the mine established by John Williamson, a Canadian geologist, and has been continuous operation since then, making it one of the oldest continuously operating diamond mines in the world. Over its lifetime it has produced over 19 million carats (3,800 kg) of diamonds. A 2020 report by The Guardian said that high-quality pink diamonds from the mine could value up to $700,000 a carat.

The Williamson mine was once owned by its namesake Williamson and later nationalized by the government of Tanzania. Since February 2009 the mine is mostly owned by Petra Diamonds, with 75% ownership, the government of Tanzania owning the remaining 25%. In 2020, the mine came under scrutiny because of alleged human rights violations.

== Description ==
The Williamson diamond mine is a large open pit mine currently about 90 meters (300 ft) deep. Diamond mining operations at the Williamson diamond mine are composed of four distinct activities: mining of the pit, re-treatment of tailings to recover missed diamonds, and gravel mining both on the property and adjacent to the property where gravel has been alluvially deposited. The open pit mining and tailings re-treatment are the largest of the four operations. The mine employs about 1,100 staff, mostly Tanzanians.

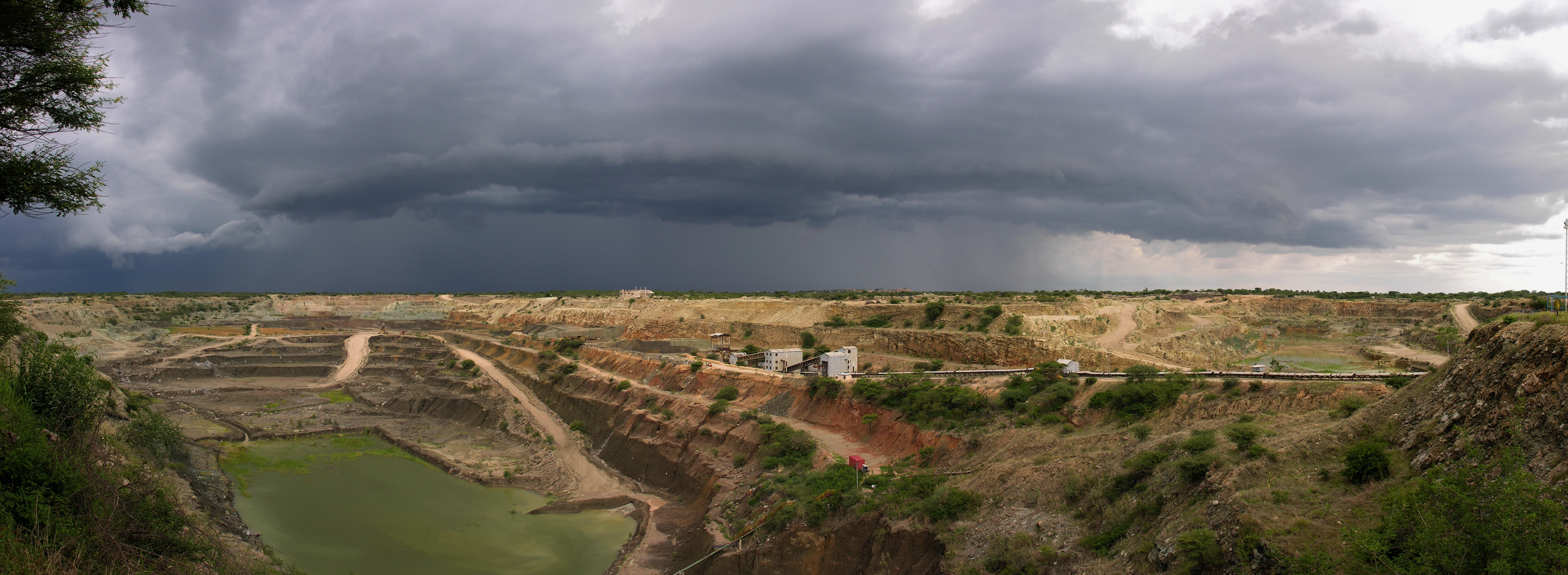
The open pit at the Williamson mine.

=== Location ===
The mine is located about 160 kilometers (99 mi) south of the town of Mwanza in Kishapu District of Shinyanga Region. Williamson, the discoverer of the site, first owner and namesake of the mine, named the site "Mwadui" after a local chief; "Williamson" and "Mwadui" are now virtually synonymous in the diamond mining world.

=== Geology ===
The most important geological feature of the Williamson diamond mine is the kimberlite pipe on which it is located. At 146 hectare in area at surface level, it ranks as the largest economically exploitable diamond-bearing volcanic pipe in the world. Recent exploratory drill cores conducted by De Beers have indicated that the pipe is a pyroclastic kimberlite, not a hypabyssal kimberlite as earlier suspected. This indicates that it may be possible to extend the current 90-meter deep open pit to as much as 350 meters deep, and continue down even further with underground mining operations. However, a review of mine operations and long term plans continues.

== Production ==
The Williamson diamond mine is now characterized by low ore grade of about 6 carats (1,200 mg) per hundred tons (12 mg/t) of ore. This is a dramatic decrease from its production in the mine's early life; during the first 25 years of operation, average ore grade was about 30 carats (6.0 g) per hundred tons (60 mg/t); in the first few years of full operation grades were as high as 62 carats (12.4 g) per hundred tons (124 mg/t), or 10 times the ore realized today. Production in the 1950s and 1960s was usually between 500,000 and 750,000 carats (100 and 150 kg) per year; the peak year of production was 1966, when 924,984 carats (185 kg) were produced. Today production levels for all Williamson mine diamond recovery activities is about 300,000 carats (60 kg) per year.

Notable stones produced at the Williamson mine include the 54.5 carats (10.90 g) Williamson pink diamond which was presented to then-Princess Elizabeth and Prince Philip upon their wedding in 1947, and a 388 carats (77.6 g) diamond found in 1990.

== History ==
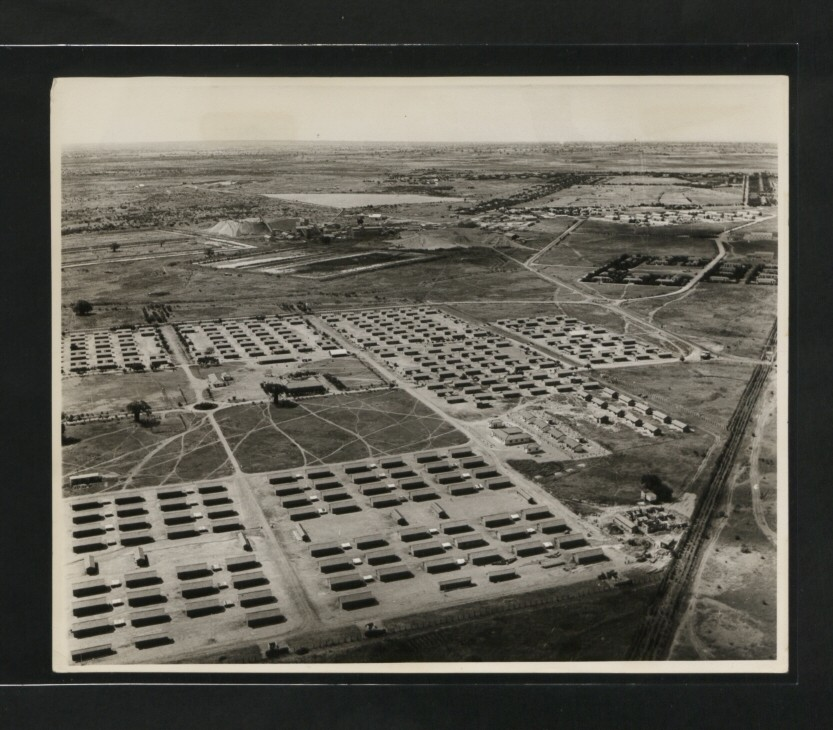
An aerial view of Williamson Diamond Mines.

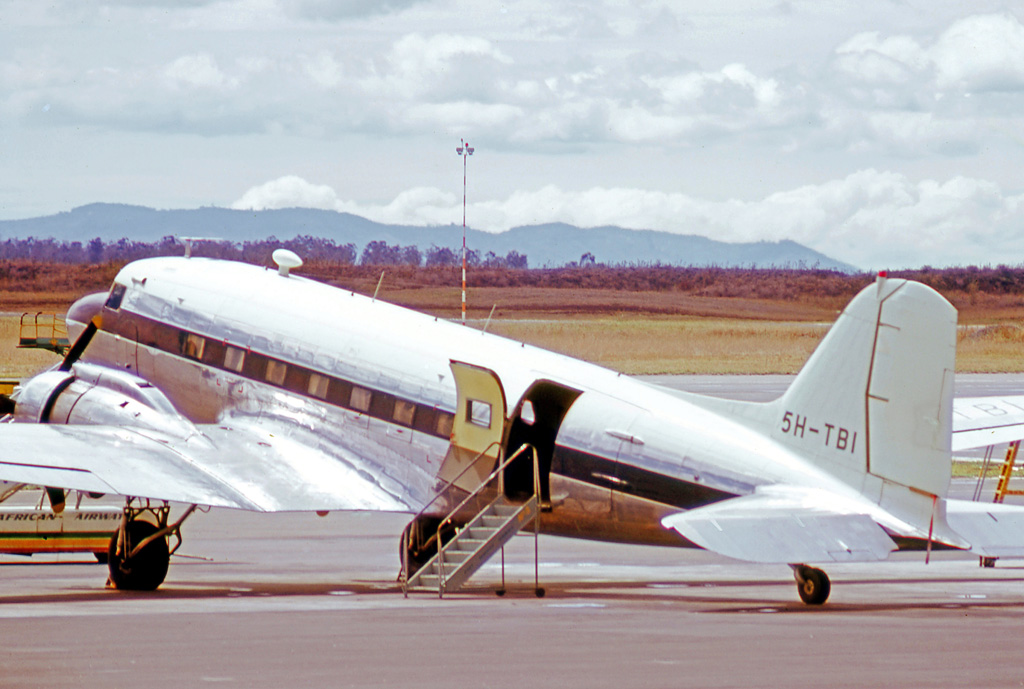
Williamson Diamond Mines Douglas C-47B Dakota in 1973 used for personnel transport within East Africa

The diamond industry of Tanzania in the 1930s was characterized by a scattering of very small mining operations that were insignificant in the economic makeup of the country.

Diamonds were first discovered near Mabuki, south of Mwanza, before World War I but were not commercially exploited until after the war. The deposits were located within a 3,500-foot (1,050-meter) by 5,000-foot (1,500-meter) bed of superimposed gravels. The site experienced brief but significant production, yielding 23,000 carats in 1929. However, output declined rapidly in subsequent years, falling to 13,107 carats in 1930, 7,790 carats in 1931, and 1,387 carats by 1932.

Williamson was hired by the Mabuki diamond mine, in 1938 and used it as his base for diamond prospecting in the region. In 1940 he discovered the Mwadui kimberlite pipe; over the next several years he developed the mine, although he was hindered by difficulty in procuring equipment and raising funds due to World War II. By the 1950s he had developed the Williamson diamond mine into the first significant diamond mine in Tanzania. The mine was visited in the early 1950s by the US author John Gunther who describes it in his book Inside Africa. The mine then employed 2,600 African workers, 110 Europeans and 60 Asians. The mine was noted for technical innovations in diamond mining which were developed under Williamson's watch. Williamson closely managed the mine until his death in 1958 at the age of 50.

Williamson's heirs sold the mine for about £4 million GBP to an equal partnership between De Beers and the colonial government of Tanganyika on August 13, 1958. In 1971, a decade after Tanzania's independence, the government nationalized the mine. Although details are unknown, De Beers and other diamond industry players speculate that mine performance deteriorated significantly in the 1980s under government management. Suspected causes of this are a decrease in ore grade as the mine's richer deposits were worked out, loss of skilled foreign management and engineering staff, a bloated labor force resulting from government employment efforts, and inadequate capital investment in the mine's equipment. Perhaps as a result of this poor performance, Tanzania invited De Beers to purchase back into the mine, which the company did. In 1994 De Beers bought 75% of the Williamson mine, with Tanzania retaining the remaining shares.

Since 1994, De Beers has acted to improve the performance of the Williamson diamond mine by trimming the work force, making capital investment in equipment, and bringing in expertise in technology, technique, and exploration. Although the mine is still viewed as a marginal performer due to its low ore grade, De Beers has identified avenues for development that would keep the mine operating into the future.

In September 2008, Petra Diamonds Ltd agreed to acquire the Williamson Mine from De Beers and completed the acquisition in February 2009.

In April 2020, the mine was mothballed after the collapse of diamond prices.

Although in February 2021 Petra & the Tanzanian Government entered discussions to reopen the mine in Q4 2021, but that did not happen.

In September 2021 Petra announced that it was seeking a buyer for the mine. Confirming news reports from March, when the company prospectus described the mine as permanently closed.

== Recreation ==
The mine was equipped with a range of sporting facilities. These included public swimming pool, tennis and squash courts, soccer field, athletics track, golf course and yacht club. There was also a surgical hospital staffed by two English and an Indian doctor and nursing staff. The hospital used to treat the mine employees for free, and poor people from neighbouring areas could take treatment there at nominal charges. These facilities fell into disrepair after the colonial era, but remain partly maintained by the mine.

== Incidents ==
=== 2020 human rights allegations ===
A lawsuit against for human rights violations by guards was filed in May 2020 in the High Court of England and Wales. NGO RAID claimed evidence of harm by contracted guards who shot locals on the concession, including 10 killings and 50 injuries since 2009. Following the report, Petra Diamon initiated an internal investigation. Initial internal investigations found record of only one live-fire incident during the alleged window, alongside other use of "reasonable force" against illegal miners.

== Sources ==
- Tassell, Arthur. African Mining Magazine. "Williamson – A Bright Future Ahead?". Brooke Pattrick Publications.
- De Beers Group official website. "De Beers Group: Tanzania". Retrieved April 18, 2005.
- Knight, John; Stevenson, Heather (September 1986). "The Williamson Diamond Mine, De Beers, and the Colonial Office: A Case-Study of the Quest for Control". Journal of Modern African Studies. 24 (3). Cambridge University Press: 423–445. doi:10.1017/S0022278X00007102. JSTOR 160350. S2CID 154665289.
- Chopra, Jarat. "Tanganyika Diamond Presented to Princess Elizabeth," Old Africa, No. 21 (February–March 2009) 16–17.
- Chopra, Jarat. "Princess Margaret Hosted in Mwanza," Old Africa, No. 22 (April–May 2009) 20–22.
- Williamson, John Thorburn. "The Williamson Diamond Mine", pages 99-112 in "Rhodesia and East Africa", compiled and edited by F.S. Joelson, published in 1958 by East Africa and Rhodesia, London. "Dr. Williamson died shortly after writing this account, the only one which he ever wrote for publication."
