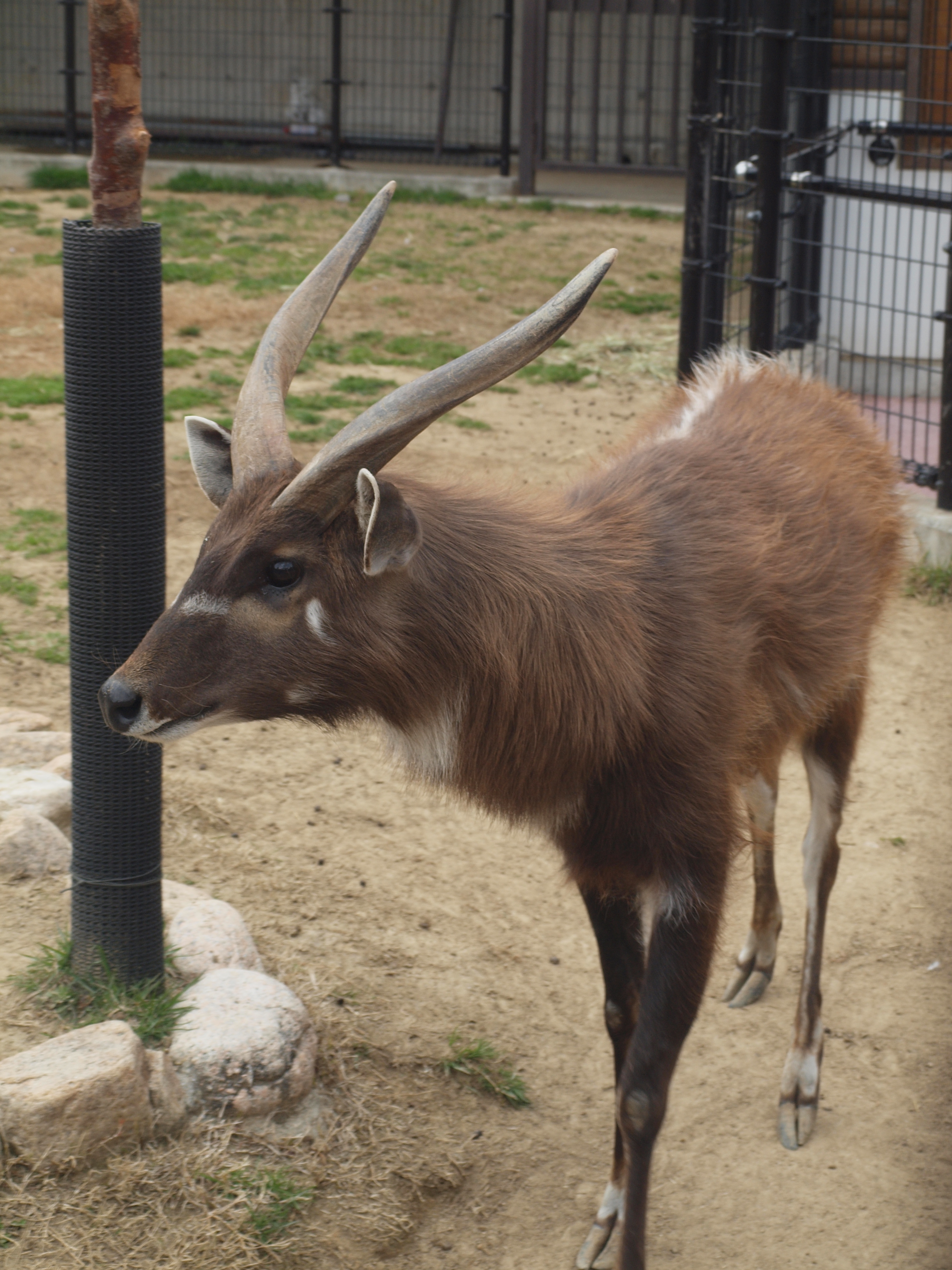
- A male at the Oji Zoo, Kobe, Japan

Conservation status
- Least Concern (IUCN 3.1)

Scientific classification
- Kingdom: Animalia
- Phylum: Chordata
- Class: Mammalia
- Order: Artiodactyla
- Family: Bovidae
- Subfamily: Bovinae
- Genus: Tragelaphus
- Subgenus: Tragelaphus
- Species: T. spekii

Binomial name
- Tragelaphus spekii Speke, 1863
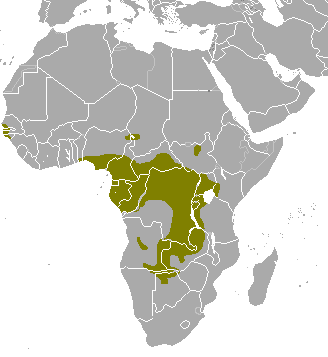
- The range map of sitatunga

Synonyms
- T. albonotatus (Neumann, 1905); T. baumii (Sokolowsky, 1903); T. inornatus (Cabrera, 1918); T. larkenii (St Leger, 1931); T. speckei (Neumann, 1900); T. typicus (R. Ward, 1910); T. ugallae (Matschie, 1913); T. wilhelmi (Lönnberg and Gyldenstolpe, 1924)

= Sitatunga =

Species of swamp-dwelling antelope

The sitatunga (Tragelaphus spekii) or marshbuck is a swamp-dwelling medium-sized antelope found throughout central Africa, centering on the Democratic Republic of the Congo, the Republic of the Congo, Cameroon, parts of Southern Sudan, Equatorial Guinea, Burundi, Ghana, Botswana, Rwanda, Zambia, Gabon, the Central African Republic, Tanzania, Uganda and Kenya. The sitatunga is mostly confined to swampy and marshy habitats. They occur in tall and dense vegetation as well as seasonal swamps, marshy clearings in forests, riparian thickets and mangrove swamps.

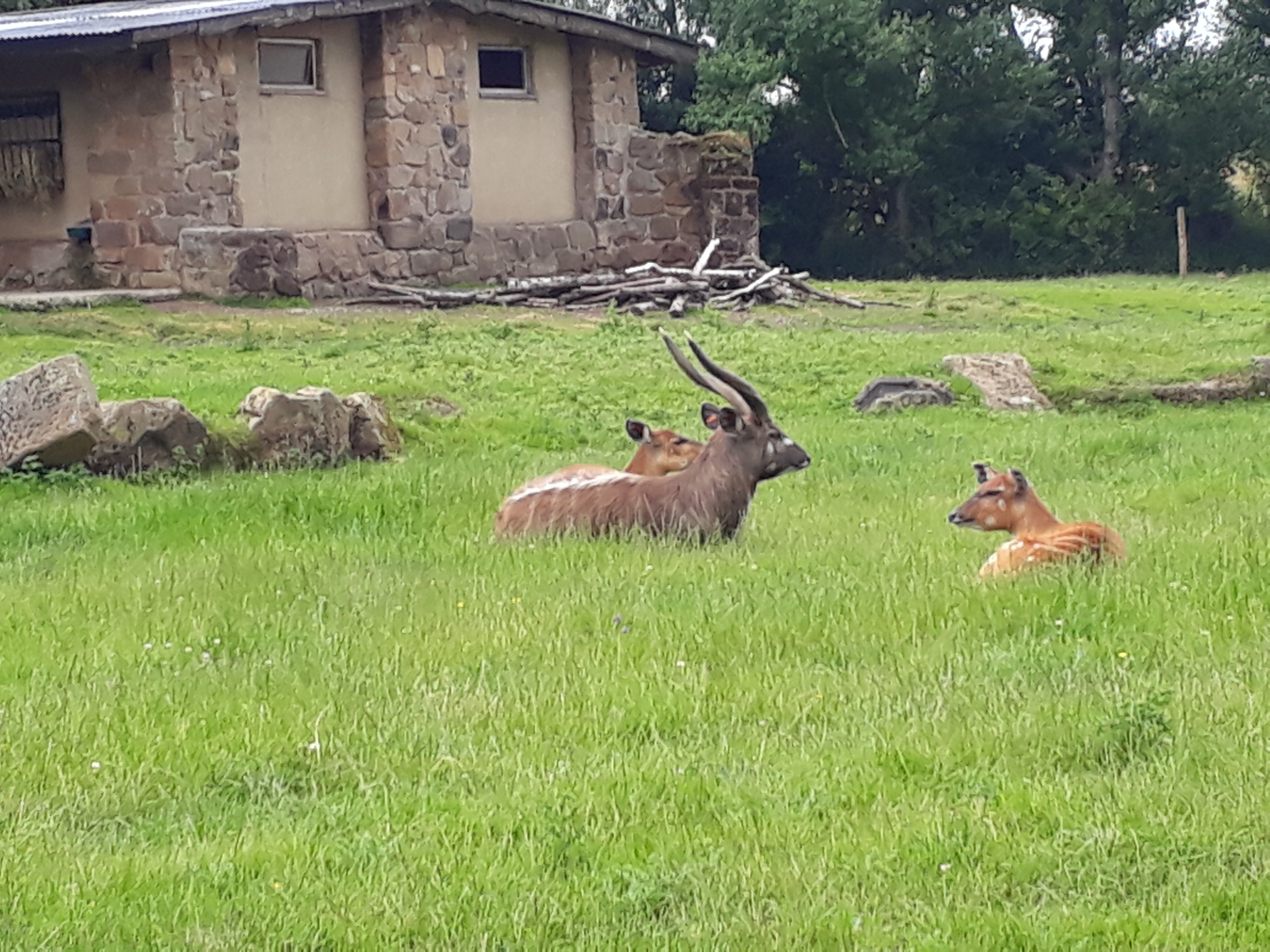
Sitatungas in Chester Zoo, England

== Taxonomy and genetics ==
The scientific name of the sitatunga is Tragelaphus spekii. The species was first described by the English explorer John Hanning Speke in 1863. Speke first observed the sitatunga at a lake named "Little Windermere" (now Lake Lwelo, located in Kagera, Tanzania). In his book Journal of the Discovery of the Source of the Nile, Speke called the animal "nzoé" (Kiswahili name for the animal) or "water-boc" (due to its resemblance to the waterbuck). The word "sitatunga" itself comes from an ancient Bantu language. The scientific name has often been misstated as T. spekei, and either Speke or Sclater is referred to as the binomial authority.

Speke had stated in a footnote in his book that the species had been named Tragelaphus spekii by English zoologist Philip Sclater. However, according to the International Code of Zoological Nomenclature (Article 50.1.1) and the International Commission on Zoological Nomenclature, which acknowledge the person who first described the species, simply declaring Sclater as the authority in a footnote is insufficient to recognise him as the author. Hence, Speke was recognised as the correct authority and T. spekii (where spekii is the genitive of the Latinised "Spekius") was considered the correct name for the species.

The sitatunga is placed under the genus Tragelaphus and in the family Bovidae. In 2005, Sandi Willows-Munro of the University of KwaZulu-Natal (Durban) carried out a mitochondrial analysis of the nine Tragelaphus species. mtDNA and nDNA data were compared. The results showed that sitatunga plus bongo (T. eurycerus) form a monophyletic clade with the mountain nyala (T. buxtoni) and bushbuck (T. scriptus). The greater kudu (T. strepsiceros) split from this clade approximately 8.6 million years ago.

Within Tragelaphus, the bushbuck, bongo, sitatunga and nyala (T. angasii) are particularly close relatives. The bushbuck and sitatunga are genetically similar enough to hybridise. Hybrids between bongo and sitatunga have proved to be fertile. The sitatunga is more variable in its general characters than any other member of the tribe Strepsicerotini, that consists of the genera Taurotragus (elands) and Tragelaphus, probably because of their confinement to swampy and marshy habitats.

On the basis of physical characteristics such as hair texture, coat colour and the coat stripes, up to ten subspecies of the sitatunga have been described. However, these factors may not be reliable since hair texture could vary with the climate, while pelage colour and markings vary greatly among individuals. Moreover, the coat might darken and the stripes and spots on it might fade with age, especially in males. The species might even be monotypic, however, based on different drainage systems, three distinct subspecies are currently recognised:

- T. s. spekii (Speke, 1863): Nile sitatunga or East African sitatunga. Found in the Nile watershed.
- T. s. gratus (Sclater, 1880): Congo sitatunga or forest sitatunga. Found in western and central Africa.
- T. s. selousi (W. Rothschild, 1898): Southern sitatunga or Zambezi sitatunga. Found in southern Africa.

- - - - - - - Taurotragus
              - Giant eland
              - Common eland
            - - Strepsiceros
                Greater kudu
              - Tragelaphus
                - Mountain nyala
                - - - - Bongo
                      - Sitatunga
                    - - - - Cape bushbuck
                          - Harnessed bushbuck
          - Nyala
            Lowland nyala
        - Ammelaphus
          Lesser kudu

Phylogenetic relationships of the mountain nyala from combined analysis of all molecular data (Willows-Munro et.al. 2005). Subgenera (stem labels) per MDD.

== Description ==
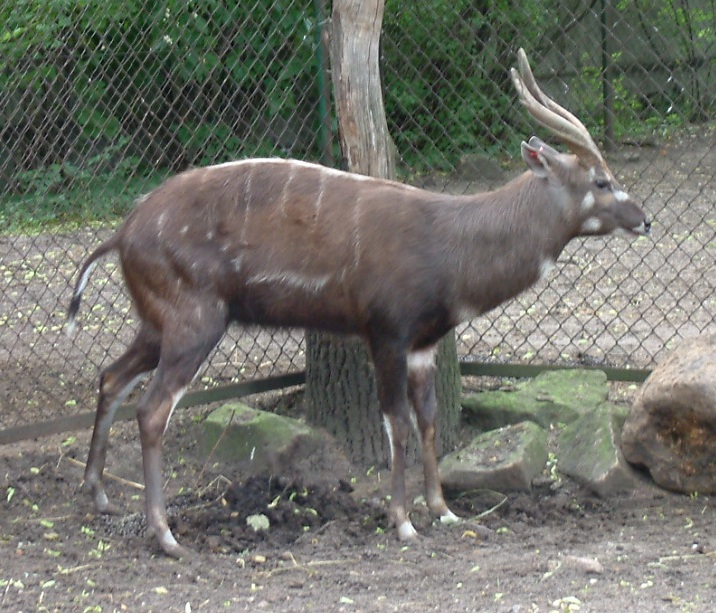
Male sitatunga

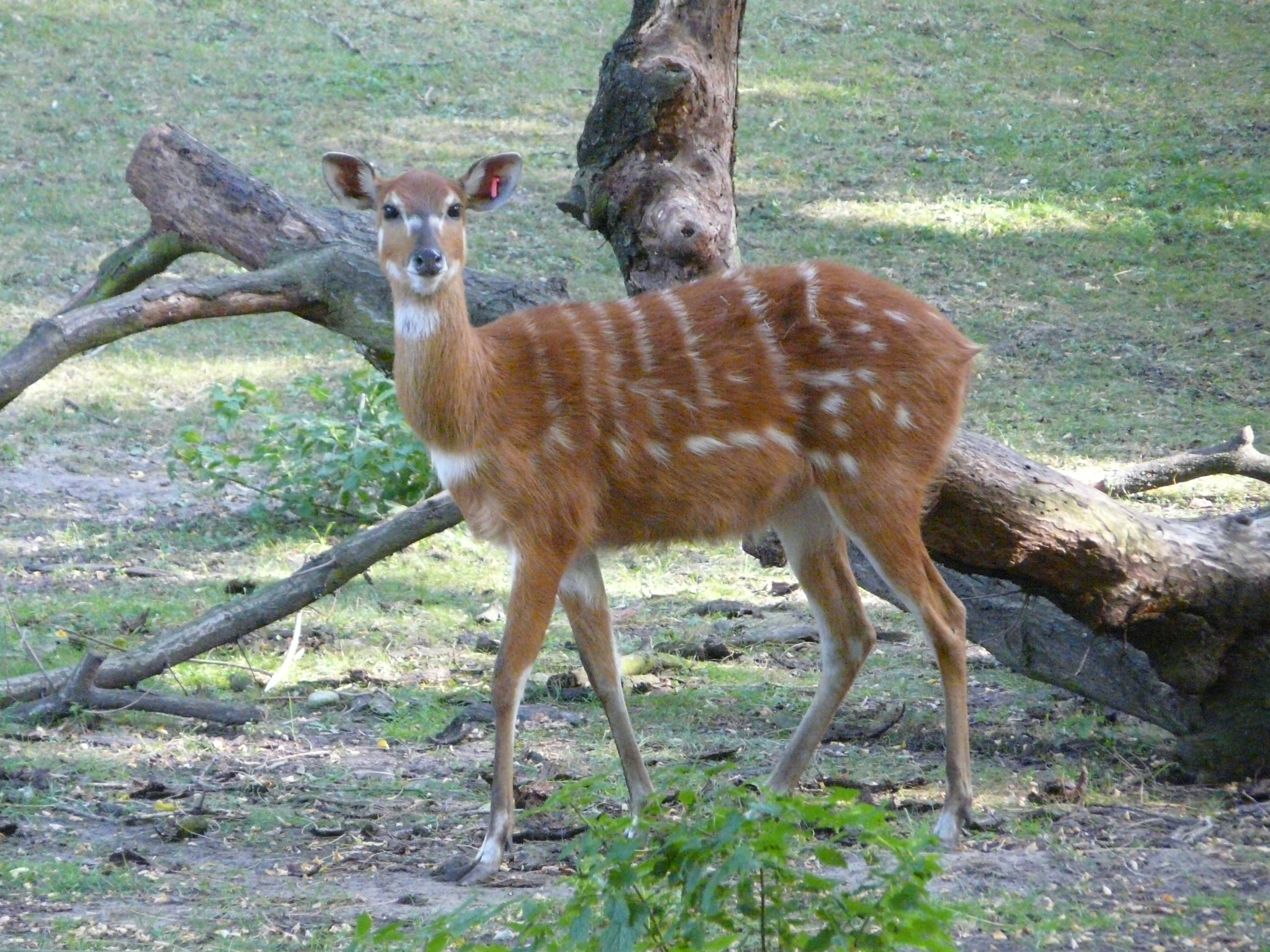
Female sitatunga

The sitatunga is a medium-sized antelope. It is sexually dimorphic, with males considerably larger than females. The head-and-body length is typically between 136–177 cm (54–70 in) in males and 104–146 cm (41–57 in) in females. Males reach approximately 81–116 cm (32–46 in) at the shoulder, while females reach 72–90 cm (28–35 in). Males typically weigh 76–119 kg (168–262 lb), while females weigh 24–57 kg (53–126 lb). The tail is 14–37 cm (5.5–14.6 in) long. The saucer-shaped ears are 11–17 cm (4.3–6.7 in) long. Only the males possess horns; these are spiral in shape, have one or two twists and are 45–92 cm (18–36 in) long. The sitatunga is almost indistinguishable from the nyala, except in pelage and spoor. Speke pointed out that, though "closely allied" to the waterbuck, the sitatunga lacks stripes and is spotted instead.

The coat colour varies geographically, but, in general, is a rufous red in juveniles and chestnut in females. There are white facial markings, as well as several stripes and spots all over, though they are only faintly visible. White patches can be seen on the throat, near the head and the chest. A pair of inguinal scent glands are present. The coats of males darken with age, becoming gray to dark brown. Males develop a rough and scraggy mane, usually brown in colour, and a white dorsal stripe. There is a chevron between the eyes of the males.

The body and legs of this antelope are specially adapted to its swampy habitat. The hooves of the male are elongated and widely splayed. The rubbery, shaggy, water-repellent coat is minimally affected by slimy and muddy vegetation. The wedge-like shape and lowering of the head, coupled with the backward bend of the horns (in males) provides for easy navigation through dense vegetation. The pasterns are flexible, and the hooves, banana-like in shape, can reach a length of up to 16 cm (6.3 in) in the hindlegs and 18 cm (7.1 in) in the forelegs. The pointed toes allow it to walk slowly and almost noiselessly through the water. Moreover, the colour of the coat provides an excellent camouflage. Hearing is acute, and the ears are so structured that the animal can accurately determine the direction from where a sound has originated. This adaptation is of profound use in habitats where long sight is of very little value due to the density and darkness of the environment.

== Ecology and behaviour ==
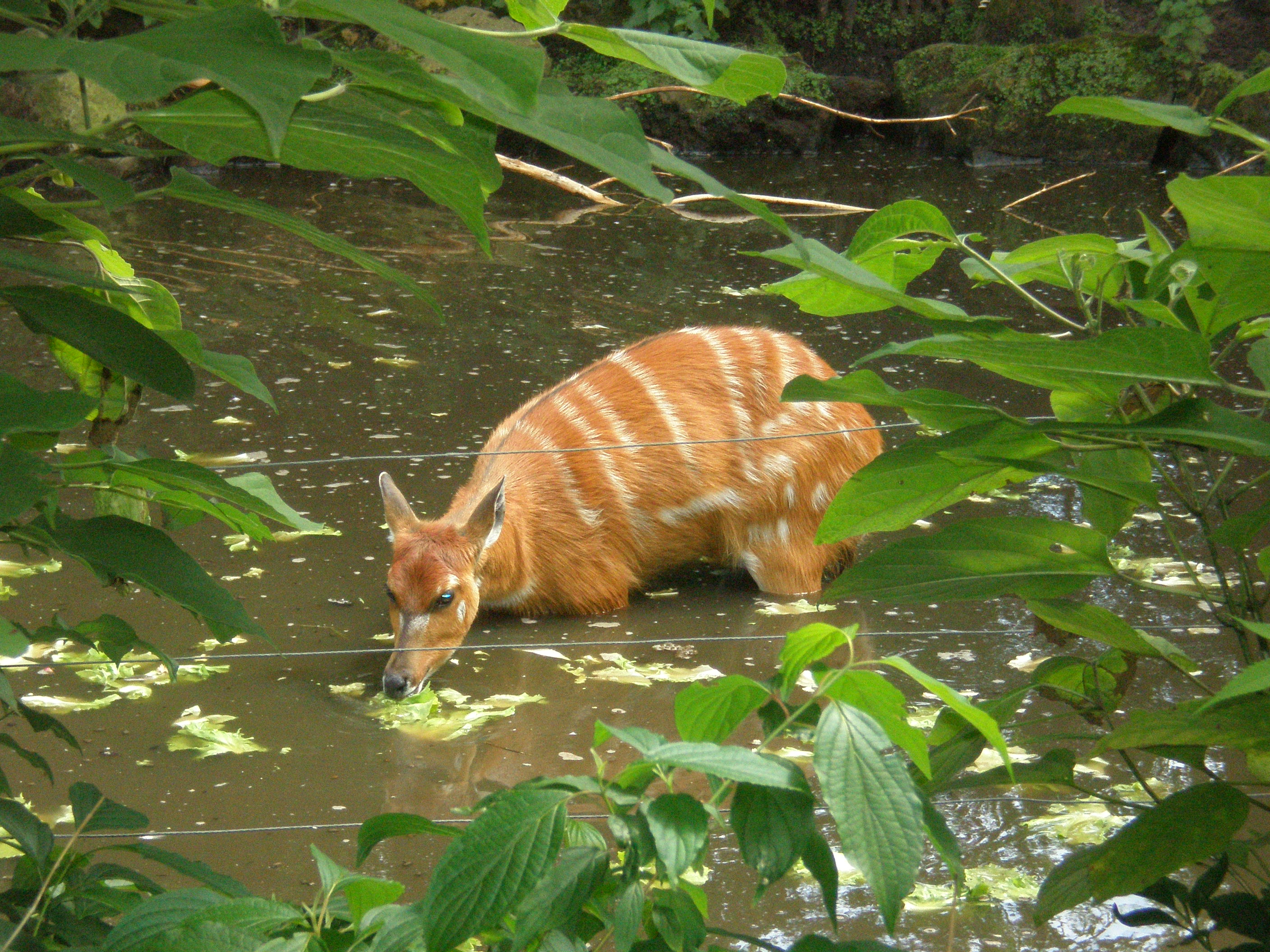
Sitatunga standing in water

Sitatunga are active mainly during the early hours after dawn, the last one or two hours before dusk, and at night, and spend a large part of this time feeding. Basically sedentary, they rest in flat areas and reed beds, especially during the hotter part of the day. They seldom leave their swamp habitat during the daytime. Though sitatunga commonly form pairs or remain solitary, larger groups have also been observed. A study in Kenya recorded a herd of as many as nine individuals, comprising an adult male, four females and four juveniles. Loose groups may be formed but interaction among individuals is very low. Individuals generally associate only with their own sex.

The sitatunga is not territorial. Males may engage in locking horns with other males and attacking vegetation using their horns. They may perform feinting by raising their forelegs with the hindlegs rooted in the ground as a threat display. Sitatunga interact with each other by first touching their noses, which may be followed by licking each other and nibbling. Alarmed animals may stand motionless, with the head held high and one leg raised. Sitatunga may occasionally emit a series of coughs or barks, usually at night, which may cause other animals to join in, and these sounds can be heard across the swamp. This barking may be used by females to warn off other females. Males often utter a low bellow on coming across a female or a herd of females in the mating season. A low-pitched squeak may be uttered while feeding. Mothers communicate with their calves by bleats.

Sitatunga can feed or rest close to southern lechwe herds, but do not interact with them. They often attract yellow-billed oxpeckers, African jacanas and great egrets. Sitatunga are good swimmers, but limit themselves to water with profuse vegetation in order to escape crocodiles. In some cases, for instance when troubled by flies or pursued by predators, the sitatunga might fully submerge themselves in the water except for the nose and the eyes, which they keep slightly above the water surface. Due to its close association with water, the sitatunga are often described as "aquatic antelopes", like the waterbuck. They often dry themselves under the sun after feeding in water. Predators of the sitatunga include lions, wild dogs, crocodiles and leopards.

=== Diet ===
Sitatunga are selective and mixed feeders. They feed mainly on new foliage, fresh grasses, sedges and browse. Preferred plants include: bullrushes (Typha), sedges (Cyperus), aquatic grasses (Vossia, Echinochloa, Pennisetum, Leersia, Acroceras and Panicum. Species in Umbelliferae and Acanthaceae are preferred in Saiwa Swamp National Park (Kenya), and Fabaceae species are preferred in Bangweulu and Busanga (in Kafue National Park). They feed mostly in the wetland fringes. Diet preferences may vary seasonally in swamps where water levels change notably. Like the gerenuk, the sitatunga may stand on its hindlegs to reach higher branches of trees, or even use its horns to pull down the branches.

A study recorded forty major species eaten by the animal, the majority of which were herbs. Sweet potato was the most preferred crop. The study predicted an increase in preference for crops due to seasonal food variations. Another study showed that annual floods affect the seasonal movement and diet of the species. These floods force the animals out of the reed beds onto the flooded grasslands when the water levels are high. At low water levels the cattle take over the flooded plains and send the sitatunga back to their original place.

=== Reproduction ===
Juvenile sitatunga in Salzburg Zoo, Austria

Females are sexually mature by one year of age, while males take one-and-a-half-year before they mature. Breeding occurs throughout the year. When females gather, the males compete among each other for the right to mate, showing polygyny in males. The rutting male approaches the female in a lower bending posture, sniffing her vulva. The female may move slowly or react nervously. Even if the female flees, the male continues pursuing her steadily, without showing any sign of hurry. A receptive female will raise her head with her mouth wide open, following which the male will begin attempts at mounting. At the time of mounting the female lowers her head, while the male first bends and then straightens his forelegs and rests his head and neck on her back. The two remain together for one or two days, during which time the male ensures that no other male can approach the female.

Gestation lasts for nearly eight months, after which generally a single calf is born. Parturition occurs throughout the year, though a peak may occur in the dry season. Calves are hidden adroitly, and brought out of cover only in the presence of many other sitatunga. The mother gazes and nods at the calf to summon it for nursing. A calf follows its mother about even after she has given birth to another calf. The mother suckles and licks her calf for about six months. The calf takes time to master the specialised gait of the sitatunga, and thus often loses its balance and falls in water. Males, and even some females, have been observed to leave their herds even before reaching sexual maturity due to intrasexual competition. Lifespan recorded in captivity averages 22 to 23 years.

== Habitat and distribution ==
The sitatunga is an amphibious antelope (meaning it can live on both land and water) confined to swampy and marshy habitats. They occur in tall and dense vegetation of perennial as well as seasonal swamps, marshy clearings in forests, riparian thickets and mangrove swamps. Sitatunga move along clearly marked tracks in their swampy habitat, often leading to reed beds. These tracks, up to 7 m (23 ft) wide, can lead to feeding grounds and nearby riverine forests. The sitatunga hold small home ranges near water bodies In savannas, they are typically found in stands of papyrus and reeds (Phragmites species and Echinochloa pyramidalis). They share their habitat with the Nile lechwe in the Sudd swamps and with the southern lechwe in Angola, Botswana and Zambia.

The sitatunga is native to Angola, Benin, Botswana, Burundi, Cameroon, Central African Republic, Chad, The Democratic Republic of the Congo, Equatorial Guinea, Gabon, Gambia, Ghana, Guinea, Guinea-Bissau, Kenya, Mozambique, Namibia, Nigeria, Rwanda, Senegal, South Sudan, Tanzania, Uganda, Zambia and Zimbabwe. It is extinct in Niger, where it formerly occurred in the Lake Chad region, and is feared to be extinct in Togo, where its habitat has been taken over by dense human settlements. While it is localised and sporadic in western Africa, the sitatunga is still common in the forests of central Africa and certain swampy regions in central, eastern and southern Africa.

== Threats and conservation ==
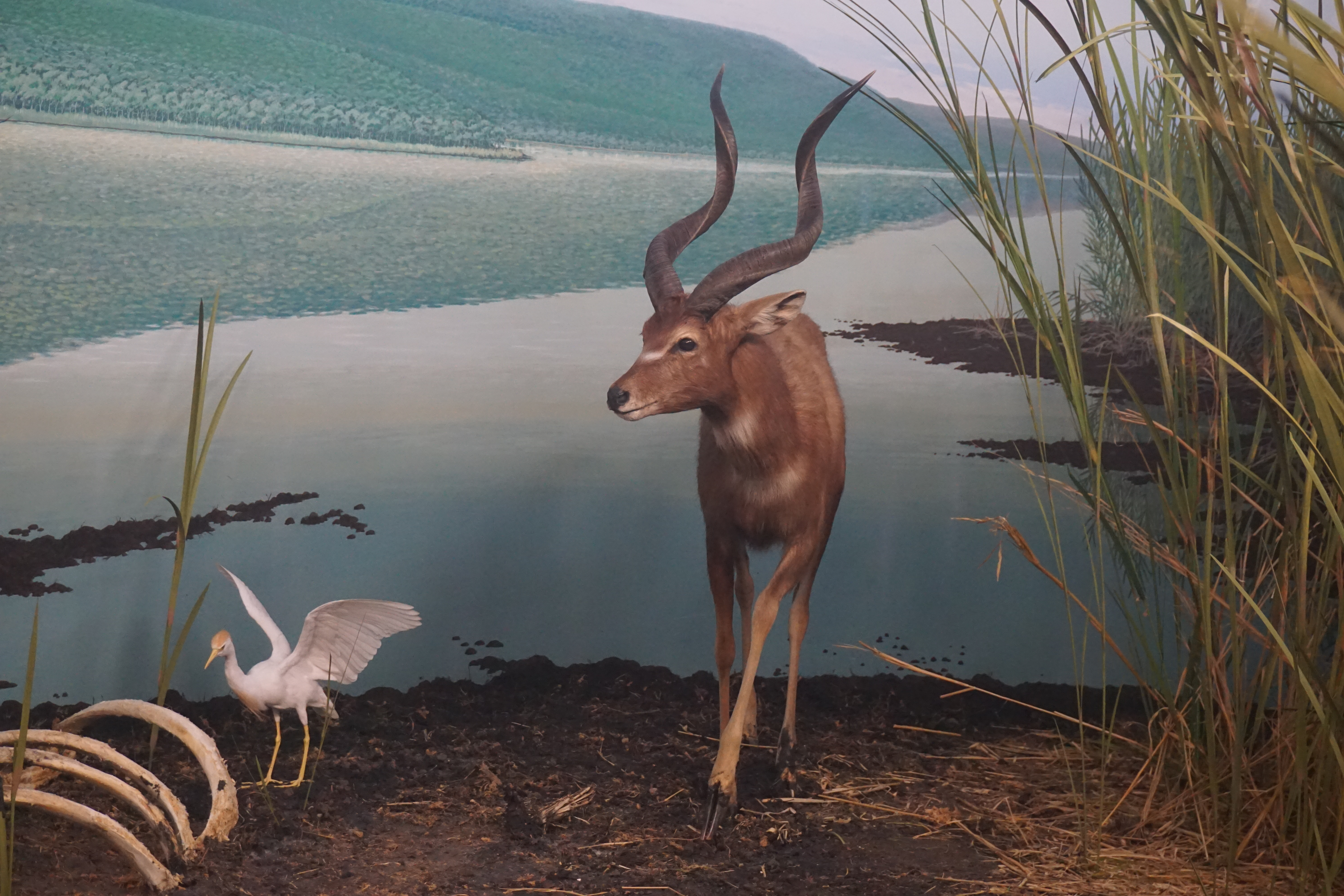
The Wet World: Sitatunga diorama at the Milwaukee Public Museum

Habitat loss is the most severe threat to the survival of the sitatunga. Other threats include the increasing loss of wetlands, that has isolated populations; and long-term changes in the water level, that affects the nearby vegetation and thus bears upon their diet. Vast areas of Bangweulu and Busanga are burnt every year, placing animals like the sitatunga at grave risk given the inflammability of swamps. The sitatunga has been classified under the Least Concern category by the International Union for Conservation of Nature and Natural Resources (IUCN), and under Appendix III (Ghana) of the Washington Convention (CITES).

In Senegal, intensive hunting for meat and habitat degradation have made the sitatunga very rare. Formerly it was common throughout Gambia, but now it is confined to a few inaccessible swamps; a population has been introduced in the Abuko Nature Reserve. On the other hand, though the animal is hunted by locals primarily for food, Botswana still supports a large portion of the total population. The species is of great economic significance for northern Botswana, that produces some of the world's biggest sitatunga trophies. Its status is unclear in Chad, Ghana, Guinea, Burundi and Mozambique and Zimbabwe. Significant populations still exist in countries such as Cameroon, Central African Republic, The Democratic Republic of Congo, Equatorial Guinea, Gabon, Tanzania and Zambia. The inaccessibility of its habitat has rendered population estimates very difficult. In 1999, Rod East of the IUCN SSC Antelope Specialist Group estimated a total population of 170,000, but this is likely to be an overestimate. Its numbers are decreasing in areas of heavy human settlement, but are stable elsewhere.

Around 40 percent of the populations (based on the overestimate of 170,000) occurs in protected areas, mainly in Okavango Delta and Linyanti and Chobe swamps (Botswana); Dja Faunal Reserve and Lobéké National Park (Cameroon); Bangassou (Central African Republic); Odzala National Park, Lake Télé Community Reserve, Likouala and Salonga National Park (The Democratic Republic of Congo); Monte Alén National Park (Equatorial Guinea); Saiwa Swamp National Park (Kenya); Akagera National Park (Rwanda); Moyowosi and Kigosi Game Reserves (Tanzania); Bangweulu and Busanga Swamps (Zambia). However, only a few are of these parks and reserves are well-protected and managed.
