= Williamson pink diamond =

Diamond given to Princess Elizabeth

The Williamson pink diamond is a flawless pink diamond set in a brooch that is part of the Royal Collection. The pink diamond was discovered in Tanganyika and given as a gift by Canadian geologist John Williamson to Princess Elizabeth for her wedding to Phillip Mountbatten in 1947.

== History ==
The 54.5-carat (11 g) rough diamond was discovered on the surface of the Williamson diamond mine in Tanganyika in October 1947. A few months prior to the discovery, the engagement of Princess Elizabeth had been announced. The owner of the mine, Canadian geologist John Williamson, decided to give the uncut stone to Princess Elizabeth as a wedding present, in part because he was a royalist, but also to persuade against nationalisation by the Labour government. The stone was sent to London to be cut by Briefel and Lemer.

Sydney Briefel saw the diamond in early 1948, and decided on a brilliant cut straight away, but it took two months to work out how to cut due to a cavity in part of the stone. As the wedding of Princess Elizabeth and Philip Mountbatten had already taken place in November 1947, it was decided to make a formal presentation before the diamond was cut on 10 March 1948. The princess and her grandmother, Queen Mary, visited the London diamond cutters Briefel and Lemer to view the diamond. The diamond was cut into a 23.6-carat (5 g) round brilliant, but it was not seen again in public for 5 years. The delay may be due to a need to resolve tax issues surrounding such an expensive gift before the stone was set.

Cartier was engaged to create the brooch, and Williamson provided additional white diamonds (170 small brilliant diamonds, 12 baguettes and 21 marquises) for its creation. In 1952, the pink diamond became the main feature of a 4.5-inch (11 cm) platinum brooch designed by Frederick Mew of Cartier, at the centre of a jonquil-shaped flower with five petals and two leaves of noisette-cut diamonds and a stalk of baguette cut diamonds. On 22 June 1953, nearly three weeks after her coronation, the Queen was presented with the brooch by Williamson's business partner, Iqbal Chopra.

In 2022, a similar pink diamond from the same mine but half the size (11.15 carats) was sold at an auction for $57.7 million.

== See also ==
- List of diamonds
- Jewels of Elizabeth II
