= Shinyanga Region =

Region of Tanzania

Shinyanga Region Mkoa wa Shinyanga (Swahili)
- Region
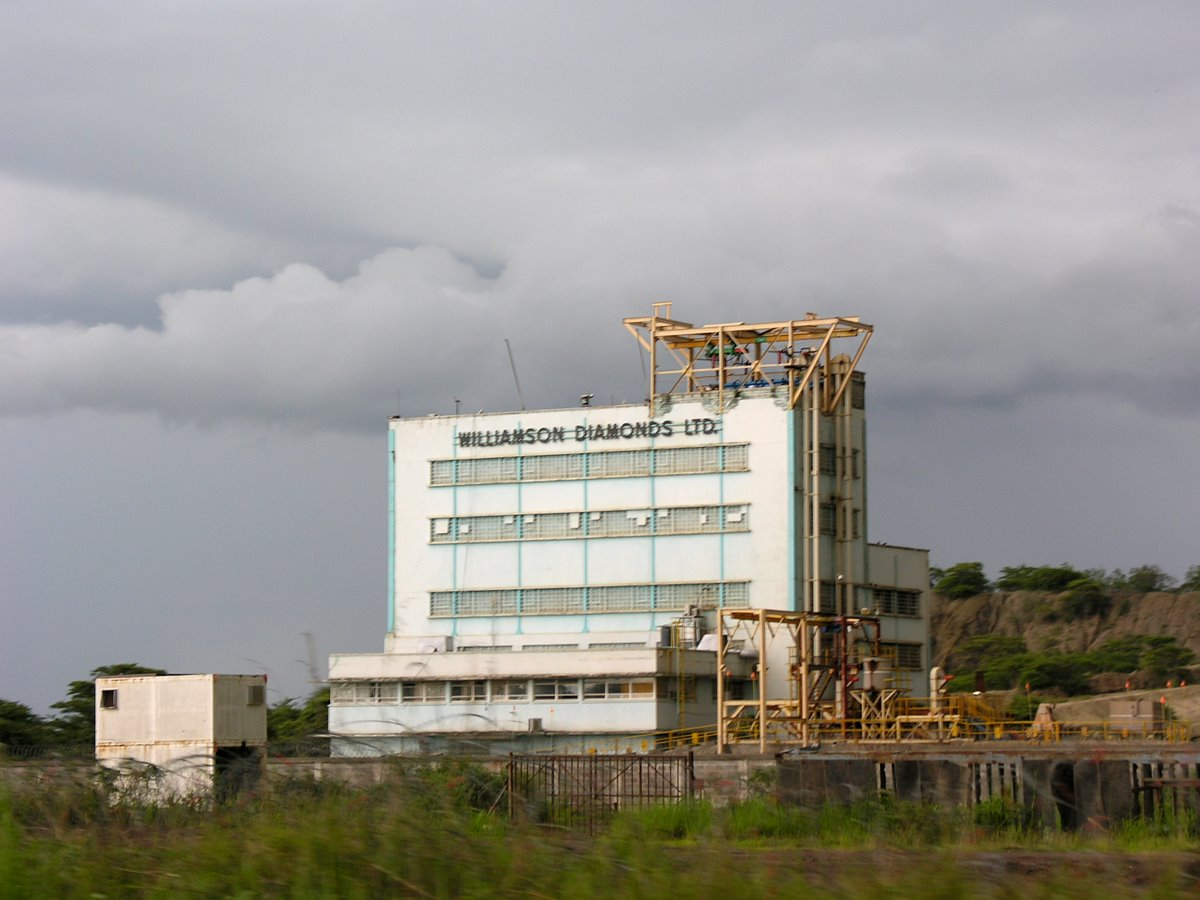
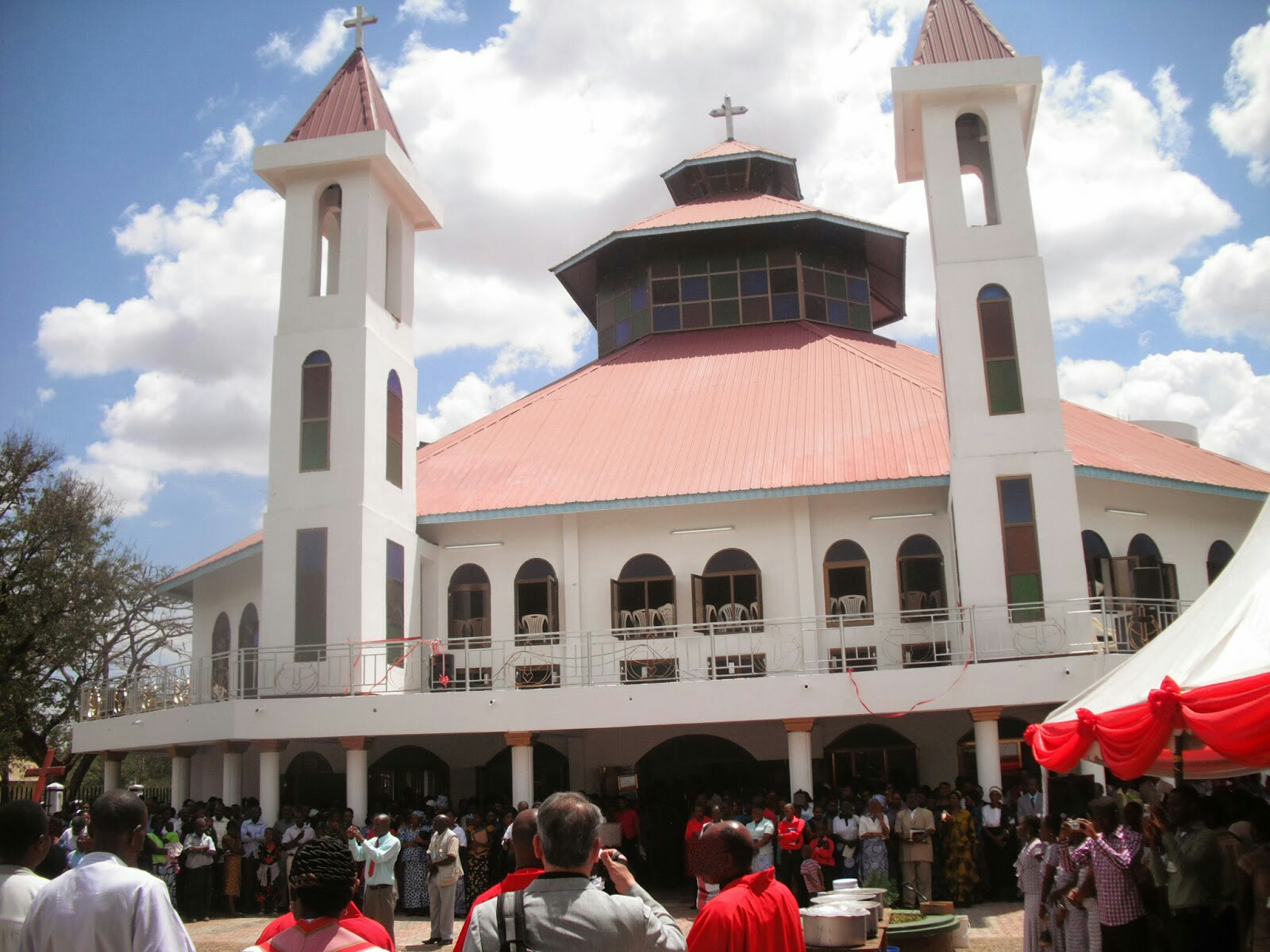
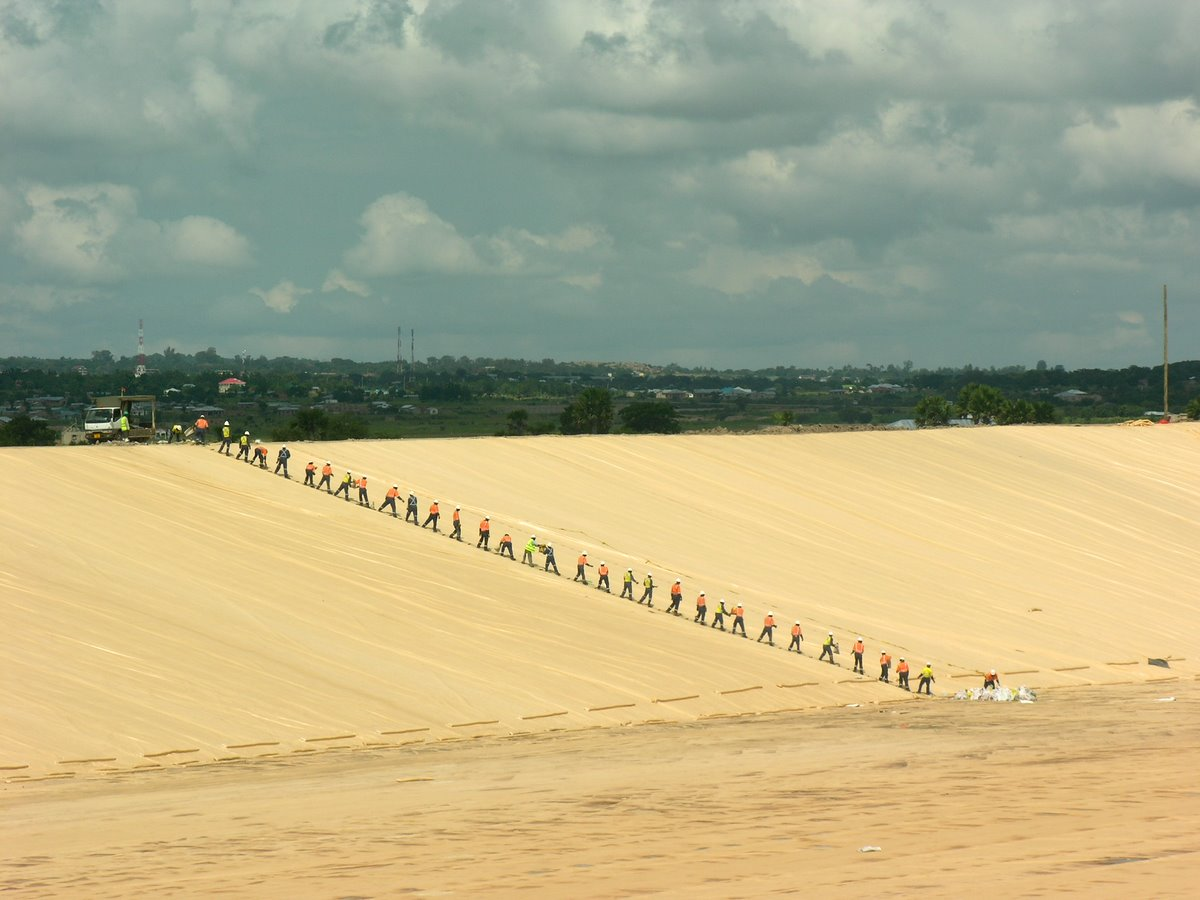
- From top to bottom: Williamson Diamond Mine in Mwadui, Ebenezer Cathedral in Shinyanga Town & Buzwagi Gold Mine in Kahama
- Nickname: Tanzania's diamond region
- Location in Tanzania
- Coordinates: 2°49′51.24″S 34°9′11.52″E
- Country: Tanzania
- Zone: Lake
- Region: 2012
- Capital: Shinyanga
- Districts: List: Kahama Urban District; Kishapu District; Msalala District; Shinyanga Urban District; Shinyanga Rural District; Ushetu District

Government
  - Regional Commissioner: Sophia Mjema (CCM)

Area
  - Total: 25,212 km^{2} (9,734 sq mi)
  - Rank: 22nd of 31
- Highest elevation (Mwamkumbi): 1,452 m (4,764 ft)

Population (2022)
  - Total: 2,241,299
  - Rank: 13th of 31
  - Density: 88.898/km^{2} (230.25/sq mi)
- Demonym: Shinyangan

Ethnic groups
  - Settler: Swahili
  - Native: Sukuma, Sumbwa & Nyamwezi
- Time zone: UTC+3 (EAT)
- Postcode: 37xxx
- Area code: 028
- ISO 3166 code: TZ-22
- HDI (2018): 0.508 low · 20th of 25
- Website: Official website
- Symbols of Tanzania
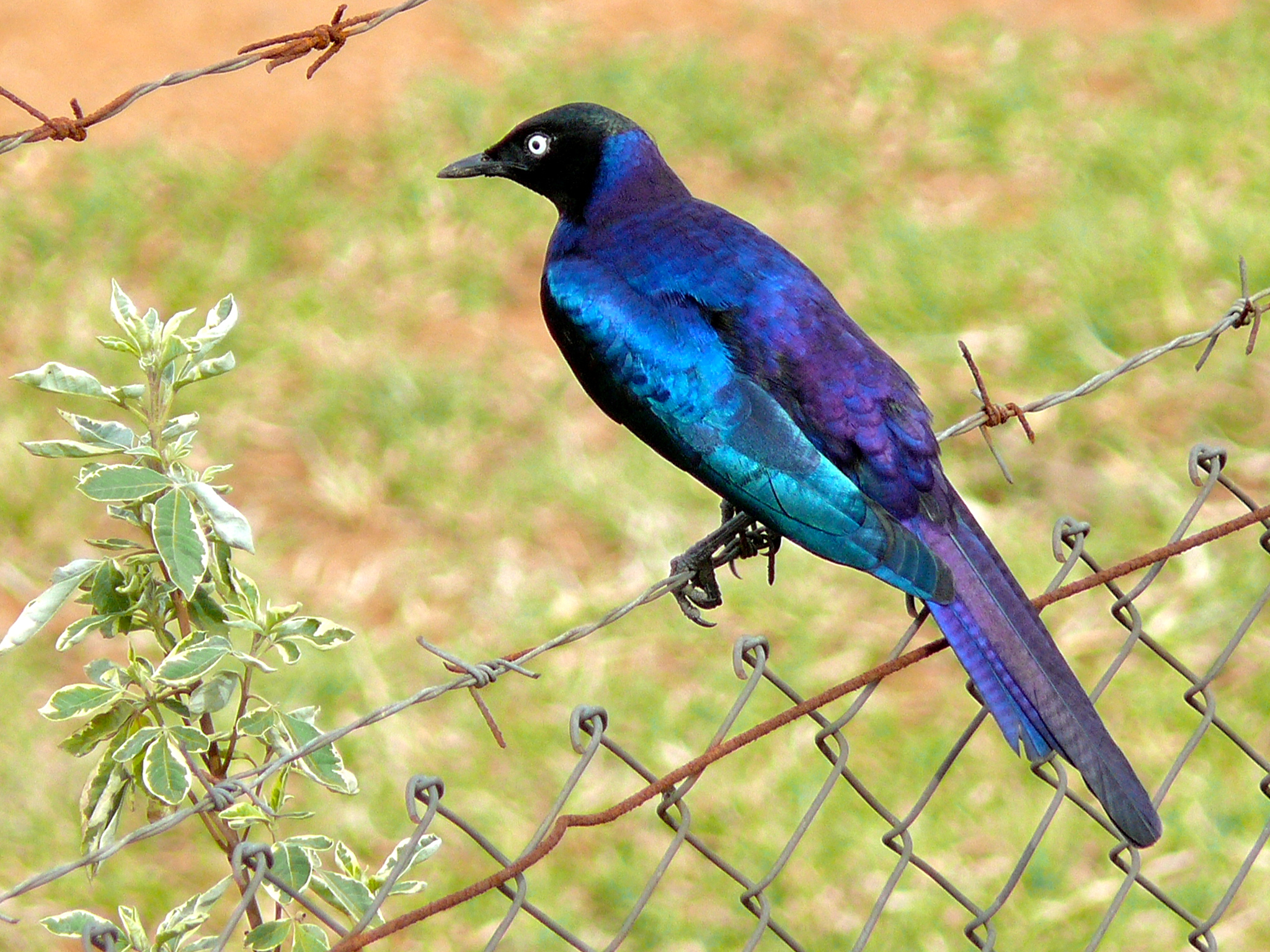
- Bird: Rüppell's starling

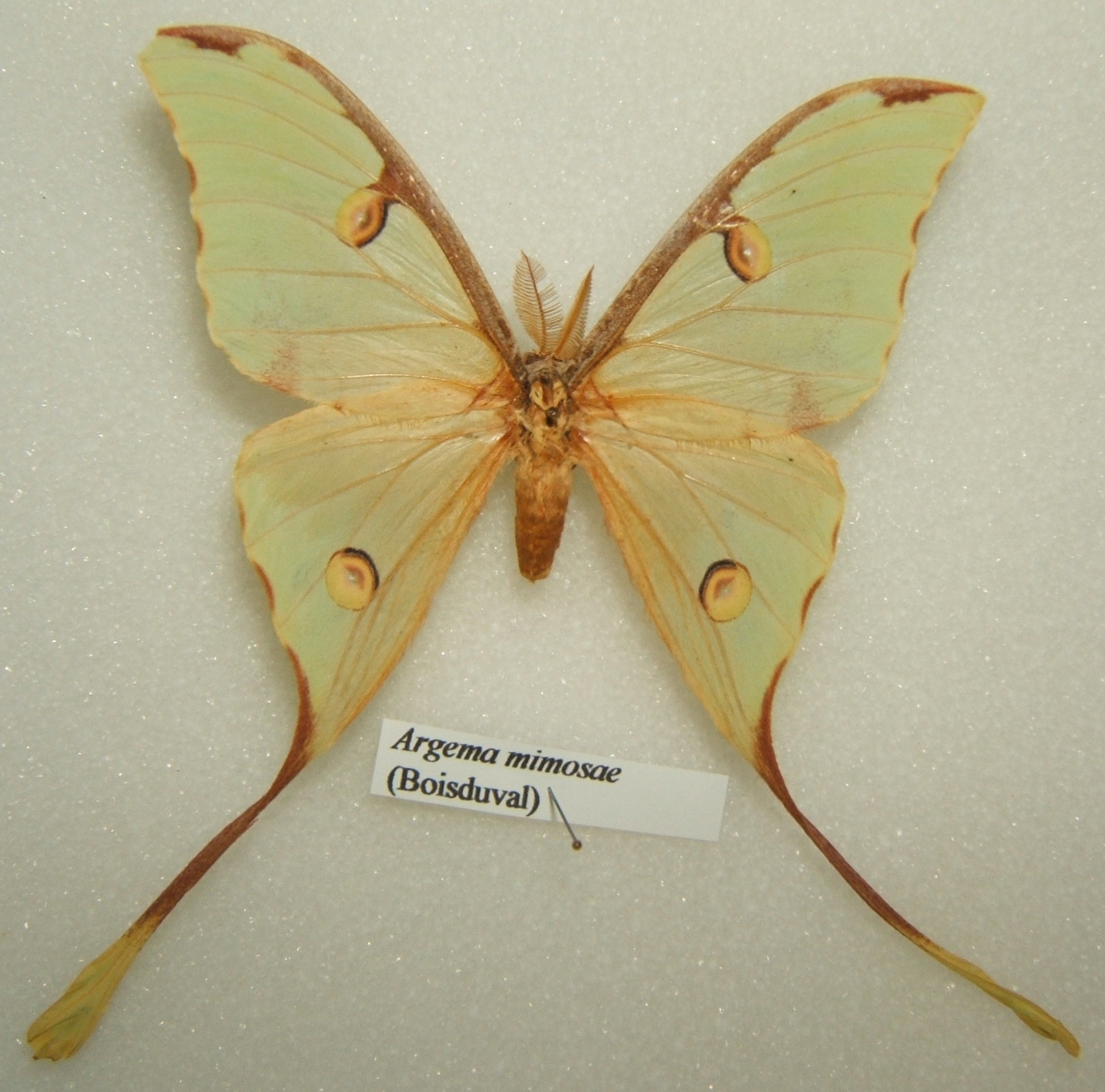
- Butterfly: African moon moth

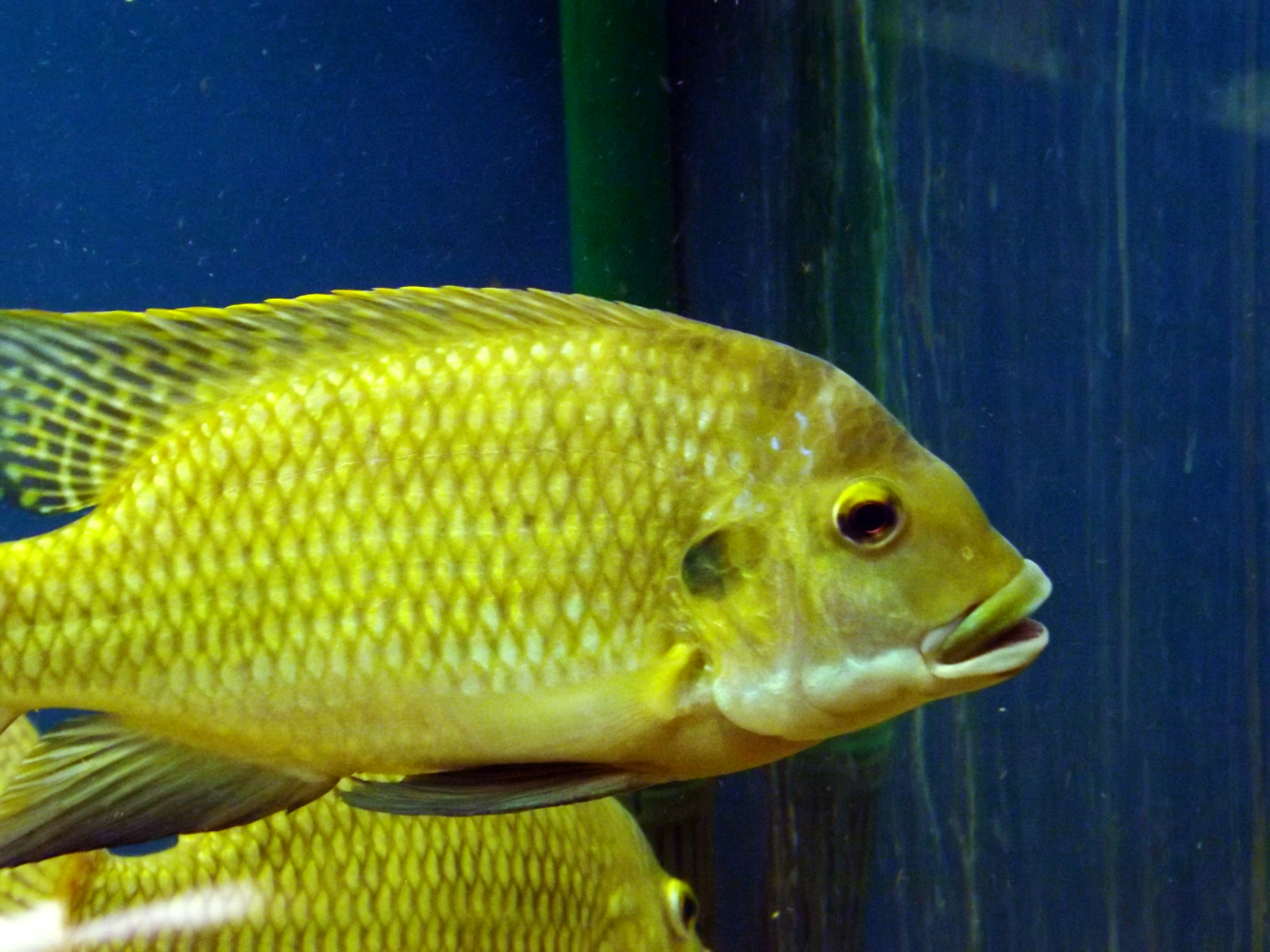
- Fish: tilapia zilli

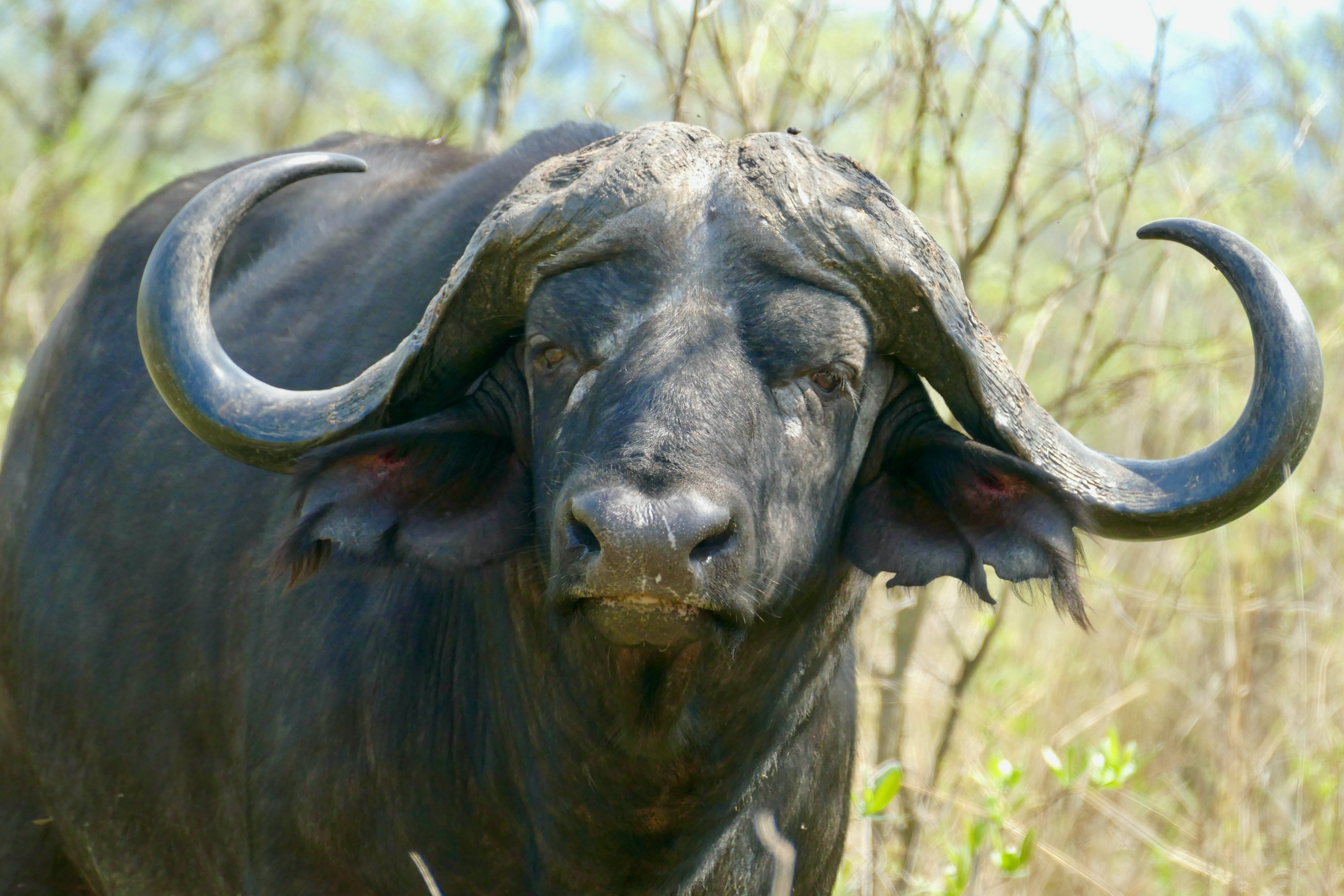
- Mammal: African buffalo

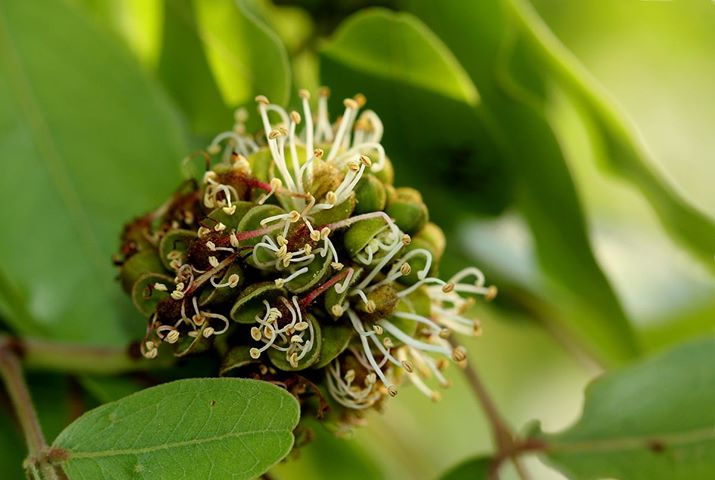
- Tree: Brachystegia spiciformis

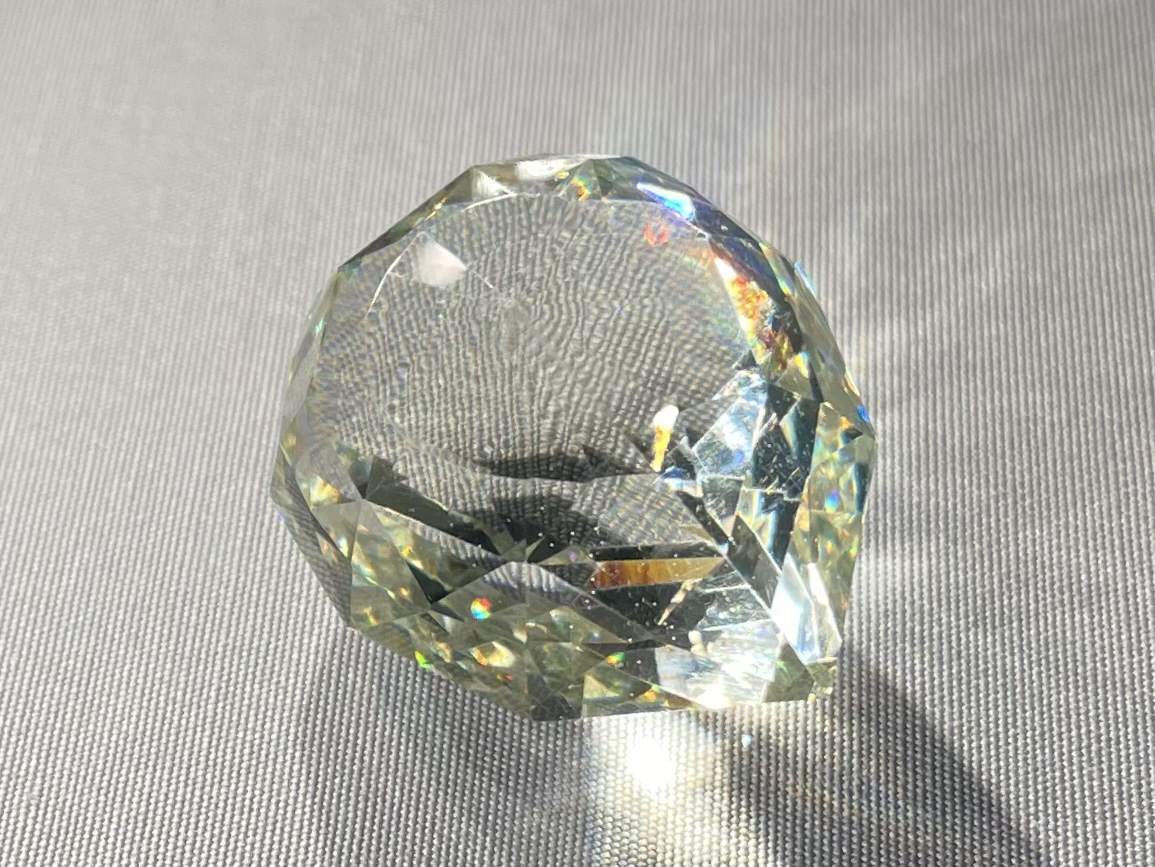
- Mineral: Diamond

Shinyanga Region (Mkoa wa Shinyanga in Swahili) is one of Tanzania's 31 administrative regions. The region covers a land area of 18,555 km^{2} (7,164 sq mi). The region is comparable in size to the combined land area of the nation state of Fiji. The region is bordered to the north by the Geita, Mwanza, and Simiyu Regions and to the south by the Tabora Region. It borders also a sliver of Singida Region to the east. The regional capital is the municipality of Shinyanga. According to the 2022 national census, the region had a population of 2,241,299.

== Geography ==
The Shinyanga region, which once belonged to the Sukuma territory, is situated 20 to 160 kilometres south of Lake Victoria. The area is located between 2 and 3 degrees Southern latitude and 31 and 35 Eastern longitude. In the northwestern region of Tanzania, it is a component of the Lake Zone. Kigosi National Park is located on the western border with Geita Region. The western and southern regions follow lakes and sand river flows.

=== Climate ===
Tropical climate with distinct wet and dry seasons can be found in the Shinyanga Region. Between 600 and 900 millimeters of rainfall on average. Typically, the rainy season begins around the middle of October and lasts until May. The average temperature of Shinyanga is 23.9°C. Throughout the year, October has the hottest average temperature (26.0 °C), while July has the coldest average temperature (22.3 °C).

=== Topography ===
Shinyanga Region is located at an average height of 1,233 meters above sea level. Heavy clay soil, sandy soil, sandy loam soil, red soils, clay, loamy soil, and sand loamy soil are all types of soil found in the region. In the Shinyanga Region, the soil varies greatly by agro-ecological zone.

Four distinct agro-ecological zones are established within the Shinyanga Region mostly based on topographical factors and local meteorological conditions. Parts of Kishapu District and a few wards in Shinyanga District Council are included in the eastern zone. Sandalized soils and thick clay soils are features of the Eastern Zone. The region is known for the growing cotton, sorghum, sweet potatoes, and sisal and receives an average annual rainfall between 400mm and 600mm.

Some of the Kishapu District Council and Shinyanga District Council are included in the Central Zone. Usule, Tinde, Usanda, and Imasela are among the wards in Shinyanga District Council, and Itongoitale, Bunambiyu, and Bubiki are among those in the Kishapu District Council. This region is suited for the growth of crops such paddy, cassava, sorghum, and sweet potatoes and receives an average annual rainfall of 500 to 600 mm.

The Ushetu and Uyogo wards in Kahama District fall under the purview of the South-East zone, which is distinguished by loamy and red soils that are ideal for the cultivation of crops like maize, sorghum, paddy, sunflower, cotton, tobacco, and a variety of horticulture products, including tropical fruits like mangoes. Over 700 millimeters of rain fall on average annually in this area.

Isaka, Kinanga, Lungunya, and Kinaga wards of the Kahama District are included in this zone. Sand and heavy clay soils in the region are suited for sorghum, sweet potatoes, maize, cotton, groundnuts, and sunflowers. The annual rainfall in this area ranges from 500 to 700 mm. Large Miombo and acacia woods make up the area's native vegetation. However, human activities like as farming, raising livestock, and harvesting trees for energy are causing a decline in vegetation.

== Economy ==
Agriculture, livestock, and mining are the key economic drivers of the Shinyanga Region. From around 3.75 trillion shillings in 2012 to approximately TSh 7.54 trillion in 2018, the regional GDP has been continuously rising at current market values. At current market values, the regional GDP per capita climbed from TSh 1,124,625/= in 2012 to TSh 1,861,770/= in 2018. Overall, primary productive industries. in Shinyanga include agricultural, equine, forestry, mining, and heavy industry.

=== Agriculture ===
The economic foundation of Shinyanga Region is agriculture. 80 per cent of the labour force in the area is employed in this sector. Both food and cash crops are produced in the area. Agriculture is still largely reliant on traditional subsistence rain-fed farming techniques, animal husbandry, and the traditional hand hoe and animal-driven carts. The continued low level of agricultural output is implied, among other things, by the usage of traditional agricultural inputs.

==== Subsistance agriculture ====
Due to the drought of 2016–2017, crop production was low, leading to food shortages and rising food prices. The most important food crop is paddy, which is also a source of income, followed by maize (10.6%), sweet potatoes (4.7%), sorghum (1.5%), and Bulrush millet (0.3%).

==== Commercial agriculture ====
In the Shinyanga Region, major cash crops include cotton, tobacco, chickpeas, and sunflower. Other crops include cashew nuts, which Ushetu District Council has just begun to cultivate, and sisal, which is farmed in Kishapu District Council. Cotton (29.1% of total production) is the most important cash crop in Shinyanga, followed by green peas (21.2%), chickpeas (17.7%), and sunflower (15.7%). The Shinyanga Region's cash crop output trend from 2015/2016 to 2017/2018.

There are 221,896 hectares in the Shinyanga Region available for irrigation. Only 4,899 hectares, or 2.2 per cent, of the total land area is currently irrigated. In addition to paddy and maize, horticultural crops like as tomatoes, onions, cabbages, eggplant, watermelons, and capsicums are also grown under irrigation by small business farms.

==== Livestock and dairy ====
In the Shinyanga Region, Sukuma traditional methods are primarily used for livestock keeping. Cattle, goats, sheep, donkeys, pigs, chickens, and camels are all examples of livestock raised in the region. At the homestead level, the livestock subsector significantly aids in reducing poverty and ensuring food security in the region. Shinyanga Region's livestock population was expected to be 4,742,367 in 2018, with cattle making up 26% of the region's overall livestock population.

=== Mining ===
The country's production of minerals is significantly influenced by the Shinyanga Region. However, the sector hasn't yet made a big impact on the local economy. A significant amount of foreign direct investment was drawn to the area, mostly for the purpose of mining for diamonds and gold. The "2009 Central and West Zone Mining Implementation Report" states that El-Hillal Minerals Limited, a medium-scale diamond mining firm, operates in Buganika in the Mwadui area of the Kishapu District. While other significant enterprises, such Pangea Minerals Limited and Kahama Mining Corporation Limited, deal with gold mining at Buzwagi and Bulyanhulu in Kahama District, Williamson Diamonds Limited, a large-scale diamond mining company, works in the Mwadui area.

=== Infrastructure, water and energy ===
The majority of families in the region (94.3%) use firewood as their primary source of energy for cooking, followed by charcoal (4.9%) and other sources (0.8%). The Ibadakuli industrial area in Shinyanga Municipality serves as the transmission hub for the national electricity grid for the Shinyanga Region, which is connected to it, which runs the industries including the diamond mines.

There is enough water available in the area right now. By 2019, 835,770 families had access to trustworthy and secure water sources. Water will be brought to Shinyanga in the first phase of the ongoing Lake Victoria Project, while other places beyond the Shinyanga region will receive water in the second phase.

The overall length of the road network in the Shinyanga Region is 4,627.81 kilometres. Kahama District has the greatest road network, at 2,135.3 kilometres, followed by Shinyanga District, at 1,799.41 kilometres. In general, 38.2 per cent of the area's road network is open all year long. Transit cargo headed for Burundi, Rwanda, and the Democratic Republic of the Congo is transported through the Isaka Dry Port (DRC). Another chance like this will encourage trade between East African nations. At Shinyanga Railway Facility, a domestic cargo handling station was created in 2020.

==== Airports ====
There are two air facilities in the area: one is an airstrip in the Kahama Town Council and the other is a newly modernized airport in the Shinyanga Municipality's Ibadakuli section.

Regular flights will rise as a result of the Ibadakuli Airstrip's ongoing upgrading projects, and the area will gain from greater air travel and related activity. Non-scheduled aviation traffic for medical, tourist, and other services uses Kahama Airstrip to serve the area.

==== Railways ====
The Central Line, a railroad that runs through Shinyanga Region, is well-known in the area. Shinyanga is connected to Mwanza, Tabora, Singida, Dodoma, Morogoro, Pwani, Dar es Salaam, Katavi, and Kigoma through the Central Line. Through Seke and Songwa stations in Kishapu District, Shinyanga Station, Usule and Lohumbo stations in Shinyanga District, and Isaka Station in Kahama District, this railway line offers services throughout the Shinyanga Region.

==== Mass communication ====
Internet, telephone (landline and mobile), radio, and postal services are all available in the Shinyanga Region. Tanzania Telecommunication Company Limited (TTCL) and five (5) mobile phone service providers—TIGO, Airtel, VODACOM, Halotel, and ZANTEL—provide telecommunication services in the region. In addition to this, there are five post office branches and seven sub-post offices, two radio stations (Radio Faraja and Kahama FM), internet service providers, and radio stations. There are additional internet services accessible. The optical fiber connection connects the Shinyanga Region (OFC).

=== Tourism ===
Kigosi National Park, which shares a western boundary with Moyowosi Game Reserve, is located in the Shinyanga Region. This 7,000 square kilometre national park is home to a wide range of wild animals, including elephants, hippo, lions, leopards, sitatunga, buffalo, wild dogs, bushbuck, impala, giraffe, baboons, greater kudu, topi, and roan antelope.

Some historic sites in the region are Usanda/Tinde caverns, which are in the Tinde area and were once utilized by Arabs as rest stops for slave trading caravans traveling from Kagera or Mwanza before continuing to coastal areas for export, are recognizable as being in the Shinyanga Region. This location was created specifically to collect slaves. Also in Shinyanga is the Iboja Cave in Ushepu District are slave trade caves that are situated in Iboja in Dakama Division, where German troops seized and executed Chief Mirambo of Wanyamwezi.

In the Shinyanga Region, there is a location where there is distinctive hot spring. This hot spring, which is part of Shinyanga Municipality and is formerly known as Uzogole hot spring, has a distinctive history. According to legend, the water from the hot natural spring is thought to possess some type of spiritual power. As a result of this belief, many traditional doctors visit the hot natural spring to gather water for therapeutic purposes.

In contrast to other hot natural springs, once the water is removed, it immediately cools. In the past, hot water was employed as a detergent to get rid of or kill lice from clothing. This site is also where Balozi Malembela's grave is located. He was a historic military commander for the Wasukuma community.

Some of the protected places in the Shinyanga Region include the Nyamba and Busongo forest reserves (in the Kishapu District), the Mwantini Forest Reserve (in the Shinyanga District), the Mkweni Hills (in the Kahama Town Council), and the Ubagwe Forest Reserves (in the Ushetu Council).

== Population ==
The Sukuma people are the dominant ethnic group. Other ethnic groups include the Nyamwezi and Sumbwa, who are primarily located in the areas of western Kahama District. In eastern Shinyanga District there are also sizable immigrant populations of Wanyiramba, Wataturu, and Wahadzabe from neighboring Singida. The majority of the peoples in the area are Bantus, who settled Shinyanga region during the Iron Age. The majority Sukuma community is invested in agricultural and livestock sectors of the regional economy. There is a sizable Swahili speaking Arab community that settled the area in the 19th century, mostly descendants of slavers. They are the largest non-Indigenous community in the region.

=== Demographics ===
In 2016 the Tanzania National Bureau of Statistics report there were 1,666,554 people in the region, from 1,534,808 in 2012. For 2002–2012, the region's 2.1 per cent average annual population growth rate was the twentieth highest in the country.

== Districts ==
Shinyanga Region is divided into six districts, each administered by a council, 14 divisions, 130 wards with their councils, and 506 villages.

Districts of Shinyanga Region
Map with main roads in green	District	Population (2016 Census)
	Shinyanga Municipal	161,391
	Kahama Town	242,208
	Kishapu District	272,990
	Msalala District^{*}	250,727
	Shinyanga District	334,417
	Ushetu District^{**}	273,075
	Total	1,534,808

Notes:

^{*} - representing the northeast portion of the former Kahama District
^{**} - representing the southwest portion of the former Kahama District

== Health and education ==
=== Healthcare ===
The Shinyanga Region has healthcare services mostly through facilities built by the public and commercial sectors. There are roughly 234 healthcare facilities, including 206 dispensaries, 7 hospitals, and 21 health centers in the region. Many of the pharmacies in the region, are in the metropolitan areas. In addition to the aforementioned services, the government's health insurance programs (NHIF and CHF) and the private sector both support the health sector.

=== Education ===
For its size, the Shinyanga Region has strong primary through tertiary educational facilities available. Shinyanga Region in 2019 had 614 elementary schools and 92% of them, were publicly owned. In contrast, 51 elementary schools were owned by the private sector in 2019. In the same time frame, the public sector owned 27 of the 145 secondary schools in the area, or 81 per cent of all secondary schools.

The Open University of Tanzania (OUT) and the Moshi University College of Cooperative and Business Studies are the only two universities with physical locations in the area (MUCCOBS).

== Notable people from Shinyanga Region ==
- Steven Kanumba, Tanzanian actor
- Lady Jaydee, musician
