= Shinyanga =

City in Shinyanga Region, Tanzania

- City of Shinyanga Region
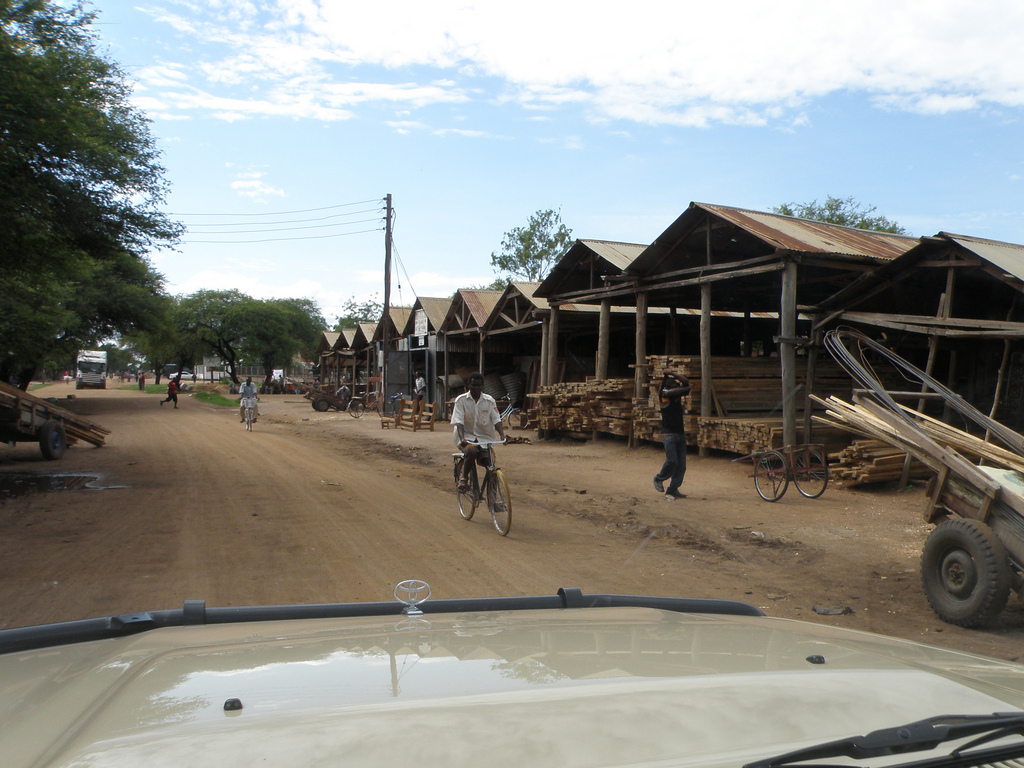
- A lumber market

- Location of Shinyanga Shinyanga (Africa) Shinyanga (Earth)
- Coordinates: 03°39′43″S 33°25′23″E
- Country: Tanzania
- Region: Shinyanga
- District: Shinyanga Urban

Government
  - Type: City Council

Population (2022 census)
  - Total: 139,727
- Time zone: GMT + 3
- Area code: 028
- Website: www.shinyanga.go.tz

Shinyanga, also known as Mji wa Shinyanga in the national language, is a city in northern Tanzania. The city is the location of the regional headquarters of Shinyanga Region as well as the district headquarters of Shinyanga Urban District. The region and district are named after the town.

== Location ==
Shinyanga is located in Shinyanga District, in Shinyanga Region, in northern Tanzania. The city is located approximately 175 kilometres (109 mi), by road, southeast of Mwanza, the nearest large city. This location lies approximately 475 kilometres (295 mi), by road, northwest of Dodoma, the capital city of Tanzania. The coordinates of the city are: 3°39′43″S 33°25′23″E / 3.661945°S 33.423056°E / -3.661945; 33.423056.

== Population ==
The 2002 national census estimated the population of Shinyanga at about 93,000. The 2012 national census listed the population of Shinyanga Municipal Council at 161,391. According to a 21 June 2022 news article in Afrik21 the population now exceeds 200,000.

== Landmarks ==
The current seven landmarks in the city of Shinyanga or near its borders, include the following:

1. The headquarters of the Shinyanga Regional Administration;
2. The headquarters of the Shinyanga Urban District;
3. The offices of the Shinyanga City Council;
4. The Shinyanga Central Market;
5. The Shinyanga General Hospital;
6. The Shinyanga City Stadium, a public stadium administered by Shinyanga City Council;
7. The River Mhumbu, the chief source of water for the city, located about 3 kilometres (1.9 mi), east of the central business district of Shinyanga;
8. And the Williamson Diamond mine.

== Transport ==
=== Railway ===
Shinyanga is served by the Shinyanga Railway Station as a branch of the Central Railway of Tanzania.

=== Airport ===
Shinyanga Airport is located 8 km (5 mi) along Mwanza road in Ibadakuli Area.

=== Road ===
Shinyanga is served by the Tabora-Mwanza Highway. The highway passes conveniently through the center of Shinyanga.

== Reforestation ==
The region has a forest restoration program which is well documented by the Food and Agriculture Organization, United Nations Environment Programme and the Global Partnership on Forest Landscape Restoration. The programme is featured in the film Forests for the 21st Century.
