= Kahama Urban District =

- District
- Kahama Urban District's location within Shinyanga Region.
- Coordinates: 03°50′S 032°35′E
- Country: Tanzania
- Region: Shinyanga Region

Area
  - District: 1,363 km^{2} (526 sq mi)

Population (2022 census)
  - District: 453,654
  - Density: 332.8/km^{2} (862.0/sq mi)
  - Urban: 453,654
- Website: official website

Kahama Urban District is one of the five districts of the Shinyanga Region of Tanzania. Its administrative centre is the town of Kahama. It is bordered to the north and south by Kahama Rural District, to the east by Nzega District and to the west by Bukombe District.

According to the 2022 Tanzania National Census, the population of the Kahama Urban District was 453,654.

In 2021 President Magufuli promoted Kahama from a town council to a municipal council.

== Economy ==
Kahama is now an urban area, declared and publicly known. Its recent development, which are also fascinating, are the result of Isaka dry port and mining activities which have been going on for quite some time now. The town of Kahama now is enjoying the employment from Barrick Gold in the newly operating site of Buzwagi Gold Mine situated in between Kahama and Mwendakulima along Isaka road.

Also manufacturing activities are now part of the town which is already connected to 2010 water project from Lake Victoria which for decades was one of the problems the people of Kahama were facing. It has now grown to the extent it is connected to all Kahama wards of Nyihogo, Malunga, Shunu, Nyahanga, Igomelo, Nyakato, Mbulu, Bukondamoyo, Mhungulamwime, Majengo, Nyashimbi which made the urbanized area to grow rapidly.

== Sunday Auction (Mnada) ==
The auction held every Sunday behind the municipal sports field famously known as 'Uwanja wa Taifa' has contributed to a large extent to the growth of the city of Kahama, the auction held for more than 25 years has been a part of the culture of this city. The auction that sells all kinds of products such as clothes and household needs such as utensils.

== Farmers' market ==
The farmers' market is another economic part that has greatly contributed to the growth of the city by providing farmers with a place to sell their products. The market has been undergoing constant improvements to meet the needs of traders.

== Transport ==
=== Road ===
Paved Trunk road T3 from Morogoro to the Rwanda border passes through Kahama Urban District from east to west. The city of Kahama is easily accessible from all the cities of Tanzania by paved roads and there are daily bus trips from all the cities, although at the moment the area of the stand used for buses is small, there is construction of a new stand in progress.

=== Airport ===
For the use of air travel Kahama is not behind there have been flights at least 3 times a week to Dar es Salaam. The airport in use belongs to the mineral mine of Buzwagi.

=== Railway ===
Train transportation has existed in the city of Kahama for a long time, although it is not a popular transportation, but the dry port of Isaka has contributed significantly to the growth of this city for cargo transportation. Also, the new SGR railway will pass through the city of Kahama to the small town of Isaka. -->

== Wards ==
As of 2012, Kahama Urban District was administratively divided into 12 wards.

- Busoka
- Isagehe
- Iyenze
- Kagongwa
- Kahama Mjini
- Kilago
- Kinaga
- Majengo
- Malunga
- Mhongolo
- Mhungula
- Mondo
- Mwendakulima
- Ngogwa
- Nyahanga
- Nyandekwa
- Nyasubi
- Nyihogo
- Wendele
- Zongomera
