= List of Tanzania National Assembly members 2005–2010 =

Most members of the Bunge, Tanzania's National Assembly, are elected concurrently by direct popular vote for 5-year terms. Additional members are nominated by the President, and five seats are chosen by the Zanzibar House of Representatives. Further seats are reserved for female members who are selected by their parties. General elections were held in 2005 and 2010 for the Bunge.

== Parties ==
These parties have representatives in the National Assembly:

- CCM - Chama Cha Mapinduzi (the ruling party)
- CHADEMA - Chama Cha Demokrasia na Maendeleo
- CUF - Civic United Front
- TLP - Tanzania Labour Party
- UDP - United Democratic Party

== 2005-2010 Tanzanian Members of Parliament, sortable ==
Name	Surname	Constituency	Party	Cabinet Position (if any)
Anna Margareth Abdallah	Abdallah	Special Seat (Women)	CCM	
Maida Hamad Abdallah	Abdallah	Special Seat (Women)	CCM	
Mohamed Rished Abdallah	Abdallah	Pangani	CCM	
Mohammed Abdi Abdulaziz	Abdulaziz	Lindi Mjini	CCM	
Bahati Ali Abeid	Abeid	Special Seat (Women)	CCM	
Khadija Salum Ally Al-Qassmy	Al-Qassmy	Special Seat (Women)	CUF	
Ali Haji Ali	Ali	Zanzibar House of Representatives	CCM	
Dr. Ali Tarab Ali	Ali	Konde	CUF	
Fatma Othman Ali	Ali	Special Seat (Women)	CCM	
Aziza Sleyum Ally	Ally	Special Seat (Women)	CCM	
Ame Pandu Ame	Ame	Nungwi	CCM	
Ameir Ali Ameir	Ameir	Fuoni	CCM	
Kheri Khatib Ameir	Ameir	Matemwe	CCM	
Said Amour Arfi	Arfi	Mpanda Kati	CHADEMA	
Rostam Abdulrasul Aziz	Aziz	Igunga	CCM	
Idd Mohamed Azzan	Azzan	Kinondoni	CCM	
Nuru Awadhi Bafadhili	Bafadhili	Special Seat (Women)	CUF	
Faida Mohamed Bakar	Bakar	Special Seat (Women)	CCM	
Abubakar Khamis Bakary	Bakary	Zanzibar House of Representatives	CUF	
Prof. Feethan Filipo Banyikwa	Banyikwa	Ngara	CCM	
Elizabeth Nkunda Batenga	Batenga	Special Seat (Women)	CCM	
Joel Nkaya Bendera	Bendera	Korogwe Mashariki	CCM	Deputy Minister of Information, Culture, and Sports
Gosbert Begumisa Blandes	Blandes	Karagwe	CCM	
Felister Aloyce Bura	Bura	Special Seat (Women)	CCM	
Dr. Batilda Salha Burian	Burian	Special Seat (Women)	CCM	Minister of state, environment
Dr. Cyril August Chami	Chami	Moshi Vijijini	CCM	Deputy Minister of Trade and Industry
Hazara Pindi Chana	Chana	Special Seat (Women)	CCM	
Ania Said Chaurembo	Chaurembo	Special Seat (Women)	CUF	
Dr. Raphael Masunga Chegeni	Chegeni	Busega	CCM	
Andrew John Chenge	Chenge	Bariadi Magharibi	CCM	
Gideon Asimulike Cheyo	Cheyo	Ileje	CCM	
John Momose Cheyo	Cheyo	Bariadi Mashariki	UDP	
Hezekiah Ndahani Chibulunje	Chibulunje	Chilonwa	CCM	Deputy Minister of Infustructure
Mathias Meinrad Chikawe	Chikawe	Nachingwea	CCM	Minister of Justice and Constitutional Affairs
Capt. John Zefania Chiligati	Chiligati	Manyoni Mashariki	CCM	Minister of Lands and Human Settlements
Diana Mkumbo Chilolo	Chilolo	Special Seat (Women)	CCM	
Samuel Mchele Chitalilo	Chitalilo	Buchosa	CCM	
Christopher Kajoro Chiza	Chiza	Buyungu	CCM	
Mohammed Amour Chombon	Chombon	Magomeni	CCM	
Dr. Maua Abeid Daftari	Daftari	Special Seat (Women)	CCM	Deputy Minister Science technology and communication
Dr. David Mathayo David	David	Same Magharibi	CCM	Deputy Minister of Agriculture, Food Security, and Cooperatives
Paschal Constantine Degera	Degera	Kondoa South	CCM	
Hasnain Gulamabbas Dewji	Dewji	Kilwa Kusini	CCM	
Mohammed Gulam Dewji	Dewji	Singida Mjini	CCM	
Anthony Mwandu Diallo	Diallo	Ilemela	CCM	
Meryce Mussa Emmanuel	Emmanuel	Special Seat (Women)	CUF	
Bakari Shamis Faki	Faki	Ole	CUF	
Col. Saleh Ali Farrah	Farrah	Raha Leo	CCM	
Fatma Abdulhabib Fereji	Fereji	Zanzibar House of Representatives	CUF	
Stephen Jones Galinoma	Galinoma	Kalenga	CCM	
Dr. Zainab Amir Gama	Gama	Kibaha	CCM	
Josephine Johnson Genzabuke	Genzabuke	Special Seat (Women)	CCM	
Hawa Abdulrahman Ghasia	Ghasia	Mtwara Vijijini	CCM	Minister of Public Service and Management
Dr. Haji Mwita Haji	Haji	Muyuni	CCM	
Ali Juma Haji	Haji	Chaani	CCM	
Zuleikha Yunus Haji	Haji	Special Seat (Women)	CCM	
Hemed Mohammed Hemed	Hemed	Chonga	CUF	
Maria Ibeshi Hewa	Hewa	Special Seat (Women)	CCM	
Parmukh Singh Hoogan	Hoogan	Kikwajuni	CCM	
Ambassador Seif Ali Iddi	Iddi	Kitope	CCM	Deputy Minister of Foreign Affairs and International Relations
Yahya Kassim Issa	Issa	Chwaka	CCM	
Issa Kassim Issa	Issa	Mpendae	CCM	
Athumani S. Janguo	Janguo	Kisarawe	CCM	
Asha Mshimba Jecha	Jecha	Special Seat (Women)	CCM	
Mwadini Abbas Jecha	Jecha	Wete	CUF	
Shoka Khamis Juma	Juma	Micheweni	CUF	
Riziki Omar Juma	Juma	Special Seat (Women)	CUF	
Rajab Ahmad Juma	Juma	Tumbatu	CCM	
Gaudentia Mugosi Kabaka	Kabaka	Special Seat (Women)	CCM	Deputy Minister of Education
Siraju Juma Kaboyonga	Kaboyonga	Tabora Mjini	CCM	
Phares Kashemeza Kabuye	Kabuye	Biharamulo Magharibi	TLP	
Mgeni Jadi Kadika	Kadika	Special Seat (Women)	CUF	
Ambassador Hamis Suedi Kagasheki	Kagasheki	Bukoba Mjini	CCM	
Janet Bina Kahama	Kahama	Special Seat (Women)	CCM	
Charles Muguta Kajege	Kajege	Mwibara	CCM	
Dr. Diodorus Buberwa Kamala	Kamala	Nkenge	CCM	Minister of East African Cooperation
Prof. Juma Athuman Kapuya	Kapuya	Urambo Magharibi	CCM	Minister of Labour, Employment and youth development
Nazir Mustafa Karamagi	Karamagi	Bukoba Vijijini	CCM	
Teddy Louise Kasella-Bantu	Kasella-Bantu	Bukene	CCM	
Mariam Reuben Kasembe	Kasembe	Special Seat (Women)	CCM	
Eustace Osler Katagira	Katagira	Kyerwa	CCM	
Dr. Shukuru Jumanne Kawambwa	Kawambwa	Bagamoyo	CCM	Minister of Infustructure
Vita Rashid Kawawa	Kawawa	Namtumbo	CCM	
Gaudence Cassian Kayombo	Kayombo	Mbinga Mashariki	CCM	
John John Mnyika	Mnyika	Ubungo	CHADEMA	
Yono Stanley Kevela	Kevela	Njombe Magharibi	CCM	
Salim Abdallah Khalfan	Khalfan	Tumbe	CUF	
Khalifa Suleiman Khalifa	Khalifa	Gando	CUF	
Mwajuma Hassan Khamis	Khamis	Special Seat (Women)	CUF	
Salim Hemed Khamis	Khamis	Chambani	CUF	
Vuai Abdallah Khamis	Khamis	Magogni	CCM	
Abdisalaam Issa Khatib	Khatib	Makunduchi	CCM	
Hassan Rajab Khatib	Khatib	Amani	CCM	
Muhammed Seif Khatib	Khatib	Uzini	CCM	Minister of state, union affairs
Dr. Aisha Omar Kigoda	Kigoda	Special Seat (Women)	CCM	Deputy Minister of Health and Social Welfare
Dr. Abdallah Omar Kigoda	Kigoda	Handeni	CCM	
Hassan Chande Kigwalilo	Kigwalilo	Liwale	CCM	
Felix Ntibenda Kijiko	Kijiko	Muhambwe	CCM	
Estherina Julio Kilasi	Kilasi	Mbarali	CCM	
Juma Hassan Killimbah	Killimbah	Iramba Magharibi	CCM	
Aloyce Bent Kimaro	Kimaro	Vunjo	CCM	
Halima Omar Kimbau	Kimbau	Special Seat (Women)	CCM	
Fuya Godwin Kimbita	Kimbita	Hai	CCM	
Paul Peter Kimiti	Kimiti	Sumbawanga Mjini	CCM	
Mkiwa Adam Kimwanga	Kimwanga	Special Seat (Women)	CUF	
Rosemary Kasimbi Kirigini	Kirigini	Special Seat (Women)	CCM	
Grace Sindato Kiwelu	Kiwelu	Special Seat (Women)	CHADEMA	
Capt. John Damiano Komba	Komba	Mbinga Magharibi	CCM	
Celina Ompeshi Kombani	Kombani	Ulanga Mashariki	CCM	Minister of Regional Administration and Local Government
Anna Maulidah Komu	Komu	Special Seat (Women)	CHADEMA	
Suleiman Omar Kumchaya	Kumchaya	Lulindi	CCM	
William Jonathan Kusila	Kusila	Bahi	CCM	
Omar Shabani Kwaangw'	Kwaangw	Babati Mashariki	CCM	
Michael Lekule Laizer	Laizer	Longido	CCM	
James Daudi Lembeli	Lembeli	Kahama	CCM	
Castor Raphael Ligallama	Ligallama	Kilombero	CCM	
Devota Mkuwa Likokola	Likokola	Special Seat (Women)	CCM	
Dr. Festus Bulugu Limbu	Limbu	Magu	CCM	
Benedict Kiroya Losurutia	Losurutia	Kiteto	CCM	
Sameer Ismail Lotto	Lotto	Morogoro Kusini-Mashariki	CCM	
Edward Ngoyai Lowassa	Lowassa	Monduli	CCM	
George Malima Lubeleje	Lubeleje	Mpwapwa	CCM	
Emmanuel Jumanne Luhahula	Luhahula	Bukombe	CCM	
William Vangimembe Lukuvi	Lukuvi	Ismani	CCM	
Riziki Said Lulida	Lulida	Special Seat (Women)	CCM	
Anna Richard Lupembe	Lupembe	Special Seat (Women)	CCM	
John Paul Lwanji	Lwanji	Manyoni Magharibi	CCM	
Clemence Beatus Lyamba	Lyamba	Mikumi	CCM	
Susan Anselm Jerome Lyimo	Lyimo	Special Seat (Women)	CHADEMA	
Ernest Gakeya Mabina	Mabina	Geita	CCM	
Joyce Nhamanilo Machimu	Machimu	Special Seat (Women)	CCM	
Ephraim Nehemia Madeje	Madeje	Dodoma Mjini	CCM	
Prof. Jumanne Abdallah Maghembe	Maghembe	Mwanga	CCM	Minister of Education
Fatma Mussa Maghimbi	Maghimbi	Chake Chake	CUF	
John Pombe Joseph Magufuli	Magufuli	Biharamulo Mashariki	CCM	Minister of livestock and fisheries
Dr. Milton Makongoro Mahanga	Mahanga	Ukonga	CCM	Deputy Minister of Labour
Dr. Binilith Satano Mahenge	Mahenge	Makete	CCM	
Mwanatumu Bakari Mahiza	Mahiza	Special Seat (Women)	CCM	Deputy Minister of Education
Ezekiel Magolyo Maige	Maige	Msalala	CCM	
Anne Makinda	Makinda	Njombe Kusini	CCM	
Jackson Muvangila Makwetta	Makwetta	Njombe Kaskazini	CCM	
Benito William Malangalila	Malangalila	Mufindi Kusini	CCM	
John Samwel Malecela	Malecela	Mtera	CCM	
Anne Kilango Malecela	Malecela	Same Mashariki	CCM	
Adam Kighoma Ali Malima	Malima	Mkuranga	CCM	
Halima Mohammed Mamuya	Mamuya	Special Seat (Women)	CCM	
Ramadhani Athumani Maneno	Maneno	Chalinze	CCM	
Stella Martin Manyanya	Manyanya	Special Seat (Women)	CCM	
Vedastusi Mathayo Manyinyi	Manyinyi	Musoma Mjini	CCM	
Philip Sang'ka Marmo	Marmo	Mbulu	CCM	Minister of state, parliamentary affairs
Abdul Jabiri Marombwa	Marombwa	Kibiti	CCM	
Lawrence Kego Masha	Masha	Nyamagana	CCM	Minister of home Affairs
Wilson Mutagaywa Masilingi	Masilingi	Muleba South	CCM	
Masolwa Cosmas Masolwa	Masolwa	Bububu	CCM	
Haroub Said Masoud	Masoud	Koani	CCM	
Janeth Mourice Massaburi	Massaburi	Special Seat (Women)	CCM	
Joyce Martin Masunga	Masunga	Special Seat (Women)	CCM	
Zubeir Ali Maulid	Maulid	Kwamtipura	CCM	
Lucy Thomas Mayenga	Mayenga	Special Seat (Women)	CCM	
Kiumbwa Makame Mbaraka	Mbaraka	Special Seat (Women)	CCM	
Salome Joseph Mbatia	Mbatia	Special Seat (Women)	CCM	Deceased
Monica Ngezi Mbega	Mbega	Iringa Mjini	CCM	
Mwanne Ismaily Mchemba	Mchemba	Special Seat (Women)	CCM	
Halima James Mdee	Mdee	Special Seat (Women)	CHADEMA	
Zakia Hamdani Meghji	Meghji	Nominated by the President	CCM	
Bernard Kamillius Membe	Membe	Mtama	CCM	Minister of foreign affairs
Mariam Salum Mfaki	Mfaki	Special Seat (Women)	CCM	
Feteh Saad Mgeni	Mgeni	Bumbwini	CCM	
Jenista Joakim Mhagama	Mhagama	Peramiho	CCM	
Laus Omar Mhina	Mhina	Korogwe Vijijini	CCM	
Zabein Muhaji Mhita	Mhita	Kondoa Kaskazini	CCM	
Fatma Abdallah Mikidadi	Mikidadi	Special Seat (Women)	CCM	
Mohamed Hamisi Missanga	Missanga	Singida Kusini	CCM	
Margreth Agness Mkanga	Mkanga	Special Seat (Women)	CCM	
Dunstan Daniel Mkapa	Mkapa	Nanyumbu	CCM	
Nimrod Elirehema Mkono	Mkono	Musoma Vijijini	CCM	
Capt. George Huruma Mkuchika	Mkuchika	Newala	CCM	
Mustafa Haidi Mkulo	Mkulo	Kilosa	CCM	Minister of Finance
Rita Louise Mlaki	Mlaki	Kawe	CCM	
Martha Mosses Mlata	Mlata	Special Seat (Women)	CCM	
Dr. Charles Ogessa Mlingwa	Mlingwa	Shinyanga Mjini	CCM	
Lediana Mafuru Mng'ong'o	Mng'ong'o	Special Seat (Women)	CCM	
Mohamed Habib Juma Mnyaa	Mnyaa	Mkanyageni	CUF	
Ali Ameir Mohamed	Mohamed	Donge	CCM	
Hamad Rashid Mohamed	Mohamed	Wawi	CUF	
Mohamed Aboud Mohamed	Mohamed	Nominated by the President	CCM	Deputy Minister of Public Security and Safety
Salim Yussuf Mohamed	Mohamed	Kojani	CUF	
Elisa David Mollel	Mollel	Arumeru Magharibi	CCM	
Ambassador Gertrude Ibengwe Mongella	Mongella	Ukerewe	CCM	
Amina Chifupa Mpakanjia	Mpakanjia	Special Seat (Women)	CCM	(Deceased)
Dr. Samson Ferdinand Mpanda	Mpanda	Kilwa Kaskazini	CCM	
Benson Mwailugula Mpesya	Mpesya	Mbeya Mjini	CCM	
Luhaga Joelson Mpina	Mpina	Kisesa	CCM	
Kilontsi Muhama Mporogomyi	Mporogomyi	Kasulu Magharibi	CCM	
Basil Pesambili Mramba	Mramba	Rombo District	CCM	
Felix Christopher Mrema	Mrema	Arusha	CCM	
Raynald Alfons Mrope	Mrope	Masasi	CCM	
Dr. Ibrahim Said Msabaha	Msabaha	Kibaha Vijijini	CCM	
Ruth Blasio Msafiri	Msafiri	Muleba Kaskazini	CCM	
Manju Salum Omar Msambya	Msambya	Kigoma South	CCM	
Dr. James Alex Msekela	Msekela	Tabora Kaskazini	CCM	
Ambassador Abdi Hassan Mshangama	Mshangama	Lushoto	CCM	
Mgana Izumbe Msindai	Msindai	Iramba Mashariki	CCM	
Prof. Peter Mahamudu Msolla	Msolla	Kilolo	CCM	Minister of Communication, Science and Technology
Mwinchoum Abdulrahman Msomi	Msomi	Kigamboni	CCM	
Herbert James Mntangi	Mntangi	Muheza	CCM	
Abbas Zuberi Mtemvu	Mtemvu	Temeke	CCM	
Prof. Idris Ali Mtulia	Mtulia	Rufiji	CCM	
Mudhihir Mohamed Mudhihir	Mudhihir	Mchinga	CCM	
Joseph James Mungai	Mungai	Mufindi Kaskazini	CCM	
James Philipo Musalika	Musalika	Nyang'hwale	CCM	
Bernadeta Kasabago Mushashu	Mushashu	Special Seat (Women)	CCM	
Dorah Herial Mushi	Mushi	Special Seat (Women)	CCM	
Mossy Suleiman Mussa	Mussa	Mfenesini	CCM	
Omar Sheha Mussa	Mussa	Chumbuni	CCM	
Dr. Harrison George Mwakyembe	Mwakyembe	Kyela	CCM	
Prof. David Homeli Mwakyusa	Mwakyusa	Rungwe Magharibi	CCM	Minister of Health and Social Welfare
Prof. Raphael Benedict Mwalyosi	Mwalyosi	Ludewa	CCM	
Victor Kilasile Mwambalaswa	Mwambalaswa	Lupa	CCM	
Ludovick John Mwananzila	Mwananzila	Kalambo	CCM	
Mbaruk Kassim Mwandoro	Mwandoro	Mkinga	CCM	
Prof. Mark James Mwandosya	Mwandosya	Rungwe Mashariki	CCM	Minister water and irrigation
Thomas Abson Mwang'onda	Mwang'onda	Nominated by the President	CCM	
Shamsa Selengia Mwangunga	Mwangunga	Special Seat (Women)	CCM	Minister of Natural Resources
Aggrey Deaisile Joshua Mwanri	Mwanri	Siha	CCM	
Johnson Paulo Mathias Mwanyika	Mwanyika	Attorney General	CCM	Attorney General
Harith Bakari Mwapachu	Mwapachu	Tanga	CCM	Minister of Public Security and Safety
Hamza Abdallah Mwenegoha	Mwenegoha	Morogoro Kusini	CCM	
Savelina Silvanus Mwijage	Mwijage	Special Seat (Women)	CUF	
Dr. Hussein Ali Mwinyi	Mwinyi	Kwahani	CCM	Minister of Defence
Omar Ali Mzee	Mzee	Kiwani	CUF	
Omar Yussuf Mzee	Mzee	Kiembesamaki	CCM	Deputy Minister of Finance
Dr. Chrisant Majiyatanga Mzindakaya	Mzindakaya	Kwela	CCM	
Juma Suleiman N'hunga	N'hunga	Dole	CCM	
Dr. Mary Michael Nagu	Nagu	Hanang	CCM	Minister of Industries, Trade, and Marketing
Damas Pascal Nakei	Nakei	Babati Magharibi	CCM	
Dr. Emmanuel John Nchimbi	Nchimbi	Songea Mjini	CCM	Deputy Minister of Defence
Richard Mganga Ndassa	Ndassa	Sumve	CCM	
Philemon Ndesamburo	Ndesamburo	Moshi Mjini	CHADEMA	
Job Yustino Ndugai	Ndugai	Kongwa	CCM	
Sigifrid Seleman Ng'itu	Ng'itu	Ruangwa	CCM	
Dr. Juma Alifa Ngasongwa	Ngasongwa	Ulanga Magharibi	CCM	Minister of Planning, Economy and Empowerment
William Mganga Ngeleja	Ngeleja	Sengerema	CCM	
Kingunge Ngombale-Mwiru	Ngombale-Mwiru	Nominated by the President	CCM	
Cynthia Hilda Ngoye	Ngoye	Special Seat (Women)	CCM	
Hadija Saleh Ngozi	Ngozi	Nominated by the President	CCM	
Brg. Gen. Hassan Athumani Ngwilizi	Ngwilizi	Mlalo	CCM	
Dr. Omari Mzeru Nibuka	Nibuka	Morogoro Mjini	CCM	
Juma Abdallah Njwayo	Njwayo	Tandahimba	CCM	
Sijapata Fadhili Nkayamba	Nkayamba	Special Seat (Women)	CCM	
Said Juma Nkumba	Nkumba	Sikonge	CCM	
Dr. Lucy Sawere Nkya	Nkya	Special Seat (Women)	CCM	
Daniel Nicodem Nsanzugwanko	Nsanzugwanko	Kasulu Mashariki	CCM	
Tatu Musa Ntimizi	Ntimizi	Igalula	CCM	
Lazaro Samuel Nyalandu	Nyalandu	Singida North	CCM	
Ponsiano Damiano Nyami	Nyami	Nkasi	CCM	
Richard Said Nyaulawa	Nyaulawa	Mbeya Vijijini	CCM	
Esther Kabadi Nyawazwa	Nyawazwa	Special Seat (Women)	CCM	
Christopher Olonyokie Ole-Sendeka	Ole-Sendeka	Simanjiro	CCM	
Juma Said Omar	Omar	Mtambwe	CUF	
Lucy Fidelis Owenya	Owenya	Special Seat (Women)	CHADEMA	
Ussi Ame Pandu	Pandu	Mtoni	CCM	
Mizengo Kayanza Peter Pinda	Pinda	Mpanda Mashariki	CCM	Prime Minister
Mwaka Abdulrahaman Ramadhan	Ramadhan	Special Seat (Women)	CCM	
Shally Josepha Raymond	Raymond	Special Seat (Women)	CCM	
Mhonga Said Ruhwanya	Ruhwanya	Special Seat (Women)	CHADEMA	
Kabuzi Faustine Rwilomba	Rwilomba	Busanda	CCM	
Suleiman Ahmed Saddiq	Saddiq	Mvomero	CCM	
Mwanakhamis Kassim Said	Said	Special Seat (Women)	CCM	
Mohamed Ali Said	Said	Mgogoni	CUF	
Magdalena Hamis Sakaya	Sakaya	No Constituency	CUF	
Bujiku Philip Sakila	Sakila	Kwimba	CCM	
Kidawa Hamid Salehe	Salehe	Special Seat (Women)	CCM	
Masoud Abdallah Salim	Salim	Mtambile	CUF	
Ali Said Salim	Salim	Ziwani	CUF	
Salum Khamis Salum	Salum	Meatu	CCM	
Ahmed Ally Salum	Salum	Solwa	CCM	
Ibrahim Mohamed Sanya	Sanya	Mji Mkongwe	CUF	
Prof. Philemon Mikol Sarungi	Sarungi	Rorya	CCM	
Ali Khamis Seif	Seif	Mkoani	CUF	
Lucas Lumambo Selelii	Selelii	Nzega	CCM	
Haji Juma Sereweji	Sereweji	Mwanakwerekwe	CCM	
Peter Joseph Serukamba	Serukamba	Kigoma Mjini	CCM	
Ahmed Mabkhut Shabiby	Shabiby	Gairo	CCM	
Abdulkarim Esmail Hassan Shah	Shah	Mafia Island	CCM	
Beatrice Matumbo Shellukindo	Shellukindo	Kilindi	CCM	
William Hezekia Shellukindo	Shellukindo	Bumbuli	CCM	
Jacob Dalali Shibiliti	Shibiliti	Misungwi	CCM	
John Magale Shibuda	Shibuda	Maswa	CCM	
Dr. Guido Gorogolio Sigonda	Sigonda	Songwe	CCM	
Sophia Mattayo Simba	Simba	Nominated by the President	CCM	Minister of State, good governance
George Boniface Simbachawene	Simbachawene	Kibakwe	CCM	
Mohamed Said Sinani	Sinani	Mtwara Mjini	CCM	
Margaret Simwanza Sitta	Sitta	Special Seat (Women)	CCM	Minister of gender, women and children affairs
Samuel John Sitta	Sitta	Urambo Mashariki	CCM	
Dr. Luka Jelas Siyame	Siyame	Mbozi Magharibi	CCM	
Dr. Wilbrod Peter Slaa	Slaa	Karatu	CHADEMA	
Mohammed Rajab Soud	Soud	Jang'ombe	CCM	
Ali Haroon Suleiman	Suleiman	Zanzibar House of Representatives	CCM	
Jeremiah Solomon Sumari	Sumari	Arumeru Mashariki	CCM	Deputy Minister of Finance
Abdallah Salum Sumry	Sumry	Mpanda Magharibi	CCM	
Eliatta Nandumpe Switi	Switi	Special Seat (Women)	CCM	
Hafidh Ali Tahir	Tahir	Dimani	CCM	
Fatma Abdalla Tamim	Tamim	Zanzibar House of Representatives	CCM	
Kaika Saning'o Telele	Telele	Ngorongoro	CCM	
Fred Mpendazoe Tungu	Tungu	Kishapu	CCM	
Martha Jachi Umbulla	Umbulla	Special Seat (Women)	CCM	
Zaynab Matitu Vulu	Vulu	Special Seat (Women)	CCM	
Anastazia James Wambura	Wambura	Special Seat (Women)	CCM	
Chacha Zakayo Wangwe	Wangwe	Tarime	CHADEMA	
Dr. James Mnanka Wanyancha	Wanyancha	Serengeti	CCM	
Stephen Masato Wasira	Wasira	Bunda	CCM	Minister of Agriculture
Godfrey Weston Zambi	Zambi	Mbozi Mashariki	CCM	
Mwanawetu Said Zarafi	Zarafi	Special Seat (Women)	CUF	
Kabwe Zuberi Zitto	Zitto	Kigoma Kaskazini	CHADEMA	
Mzee Ngwali Zubeir	Zubeir	Mkwajuni	CCM	
Mussa Azan Zungu	Zungu	Ilala	CCM	

== Sources ==
- "Parliament of Tanzania: Members of Parliament: 2005-2010". Archived from the original on 2014-01-19.
- "Parliament of Tanzania: Members of Parliament: 2010-2015". Archived from the original on 2013-08-03.
