= Juma (name) =

Juma is a masculine given name and surname of Arabic origin. Notable people with the name include:

== Given name ==
- Juma (actor) (1943–1989), Zanzibar born child actor
- Juma Abudu (born 1963), Kenyan weightlifter
- Juma Jamaldin Akukweti (1947–2007), Tanzanian politician
- Juma Ali (born 1950), Tanzanian politician
- Juma Azbarga (born 1956), Israeli Arab politician
- Juma Bah (born 2006), Sierra Leonean footballer
- Juma Butabika (died 1979), Ugandan military officer
- Juma Clarence (born 1989), Trinidadian footballer
- Juma Din (born 1973), Afghan held in Guantanamo
- Juma al-Dossary, Bahraini held in Guantanamo
- Juma Hilal Faraj, Bahraini footballer
- Juma Genaro (born 1986), South Sudanese footballer
- Juma Gul (born 1999), Afghan cricketer
- Juma Al-Habsi (born 1996), Omani footballer
- Juma Duni Haji (born 1950), Tanzanian politician
- Juma Khan Hamdard (born 1954), Afghan provincial governor
- Juma Ikangaa (born 1957) Tanzanian marathon runner
- Juma Inad (born 1956), Iraqi military officer
- Juma Jabu (born 1988), Tanzanian footballer
- Juma Salem Johar (born 1970), Qatari footballer
- Juma Sururu Juma (born 1966), Tanzanian politician
- Juma Al Kaabi (1966–2017), Emirati diplomat
- Juma Kapuya (born 1945), Tanzanian politician
- Juma Kaseja (born 1985), Tanzanian footballer
- Juma Khan, Afghan alleged drug smuggler
- Juma Hassan Killimbah (born 1966), Tanzanian politician
- Juma Kisaame (born 1965), Ugandan accountant and businessman
- Juma Kvaratskhelia (born 1969), Abkhazian football player
- Juma Luzio (born 1997), Tanzanian football player
- Juma Lala (unknown birth date), Pakistani-Afghan music artist and singer.
- Juma al Majid (born 1930), UAE businessman
- Juma Al-Maktoum (born 1984), Emirati sport shooter
- Juma bin Maktoum bin Hasher Al Maktoum (1891–??), Emirati royal
- Juma Ali Malou, South Sudanese politician
- Juma Darwish Al-Mashri (born 1984), Oman footballer
- Juma Masudi (born 1977), Burundian footballer
- Juma Miyagi (born 2003), Ugandan cricketer
- Juma Mkambi (1955–2010), Tanzanian football player
- Juma Abdul Mnyamani (born 1992), Tanzanian footballer
- Juma Mnyampanda (born 1967), Tanzanian runner
- Juma Mossi (born 1973), Burundian footballer
- Juma Muwowo (born 1980), Zambian badminton player
- Juma Mwapachu (1942–2025), Tanzanian politician
- Juma Namangani (1969–2001), Uzbek Islamist militant
- Juma Nature (born 1980), Tanzanian hip hop artist and a singer
- Juma Ndiwa (born 1960), Kenyan runner
- Juma Ngasongwa (born 1941), Tanzanian politician
- Juma Njwayo (born 1964), Tanzanian politician
- Juma Nkamia (born 1972), Tanzanian politician
- Juma Oris (died 2001), Ugandan rebel leader
- Juma Pondamali, Tanzanian football player
- Juma Rashed (born 1972), Emirati footballer
- Juma Santos (1948–2007), American percussionist
- Juma da Silva (born 1993), Brazilian volleyball player
- Juma Sultan (born 1942), American percussionist
- Juma Al-Wahaibi (born 1980), Omani footballer
- Juma Saeed Worju, South Sudanese politician
- Juma Xipaia (born 1991), Brazilian indigenous activist

== Surname ==
- Calestous Juma (1953–2017), Harvard professor of the Practice of International Development
- Ibrahim Juma (footballer) (born 1992), Ugandan footballer
- Jamal Jumá, Iraqi-Danish poet
- Khaled Juma (born 1965), Palestinian poet, author of children's books, writer of song lyrics and plays
- Masoud Juma (born 1996), Kenyan footballer
- Musa Juma (1968–2011), Kenyan rumba and Benga musician
- Omar Ali Juma (1941–2001), Chief Minister of Zanzibar
- Rajab Ahmad Juma, Tanzanian politician
- Riziki Omar Juma, Tanzanian politician
- Shoka Khamis Juma, Tanzanian politician

== See also ==
- Jumaa
