= Lumumba Secondary School =

Coordinates: 6.1568°S 39.2063°E

Location
- Malawi Rd, Zanzibar, Tanzania; On the outskirt of the Stone Town at Kinazini locality, a few meters from the Indian Ocean; Zanzibar; Saateni; Tanzania

Information
- Former name: King George VI College
- Motto: Committed to excellence in both academic and moral achievements
- Established: 1958; 68 years ago
- Teaching staff: 27
- Enrolment: 850
- Student to teacher ratio: 31.5 (2019)

Lumumba Secondary School is a public, coeducational secondary school in Saateni, Zanzibar, Tanzania. It is Zanzibar's largest secondary school, and has been called one of the best secondary schools in Zanzibar. From 1958 until the Zanzibar Revolution of 1964, the school was named in honor of King George VI.

== History ==
Lumumba Secondary School began in 1953, known as "Government Boys' Secondary School", which was located in the building now known as Ben Bella Secondary School. In 1958 the school relocated to Kinazini. In 1959, it was renamed in honor of King George VI, and began enrolling students for the first time. It enrolled 7 girls out of the class of 20 students.

In 1964 the school was again renamed, for Congo Premier Patrice Lumumba, and it was known as "Lumumba College". In 1977 the school became "Marine and Fisheries College", and began selective enrollment. The school officially became "Lumumba Secondary School" in 1985, suspending the fishing curriculum and adopting a secondary school curriculum to allow specialization in science subjects.

A major renovation of the school in 1990 included construction of a corrugated iron sheet roof, under the sponsorship of Danish International Development Agency. Students developed a pond (Bwawa la samaki) in 1990 to support raising newts for experimental purposes, and projects in 1995 to keep rabbits and ducks. Additionally, students established a frog-raising project in 1999.

== Curriculum ==
O-level subjects offered are physics, chemistry, biology, mathematics, geography, English language, Kiswahili, civics, and Islamic knowledge. A-level courses available are general studies, basic applied mathematics, advanced mathematics, physics, chemistry, geography, and biology.

== External support and research ==
=== Curricular trainings ===
UNICEF held a 2018 training at the school for 600 students from across Tanzania on the Global Goals initiative of the United Nations, specifically on its 2030 Sustainable Development Agenda. In 2019 the Renewable Energy of Zanzibar Association began to implement its "Roots and Shoots" program at the school, a program developed by Jane Goodall to "encourage young people to learn about, demonstrate care and concern for environment, animals and human communities through hands-on activities and member based activities in schools and communities".

=== Infrastructure ===
The school has received infrastructure support from several organizations. The school has benefitted from a 2017 Tanzanian initiative, the president's Desk Campaign committee fundraising to buy desks and chairs for schools.

In 2011, the U.S. State Department, through the Kennedy-Lugar Youth Exchange and Study Programs, donated internet-accessible computers to accomplish the school's Lumumba Library Improvement Project, and develop the Lumumba School library database through the U.S.ambassador's Self Help Fund.

=== Research ===
South Carolina State University, in partnership with USAID and the Tanzania Ministry of Education, has provided science textbooks (in biology, chemistry, physics and mathematics) to students at the school. Researchers "noted a significant improvement in students' ability to think critically and solve problems. Also, student-teacher interaction significantly improved and teachers were better prepared to instruct class, enhancing classroom practices and management."

A case study by Halima Abbas Noormohammed examined methods used by Islamic education instructors "to inculcate moral values at Lumumba Secondary School". The study reported that teachers are "not confined only on imparting knowledge and skills to learners but also to enhance the students' moral conduct through Islamic values, ethics, and manners", and that teaching methods included "questioning, seminars, group discussions, models, inductive, storytelling, metaphor and lecture based method, in which all of these were proved to be in conformity with the Qur'an and Sunnah of the Prophet".

== Notable alumni ==
- Abdalla Ali
- Amina Salum Ali
- Diana Chikotesha, Footballer and FIFA referee
- Mohammed Gharib Bilal, former Vice President of Zanzibar and Vice President of the United Republic of Tanzania
- Juma Duni Haji
- Juma Othman Hija, 1986, Tanzanian politician, member of parliament.
- Ismail Jussa
- Amani Abeid Karume, former President of Revolutionary Government of Zanzibar
- Yussuf Khamis
- Hussein Mzee
- Juma Hamad Omar, 1974. Tanzanian politician, member of parliament.
- Saada Salum
- Ali Mohammed Shein, President of Zanzibar
- Pereira Silima
- Haroun Suleiman
- Samia Suluhu

== See also ==
- Education in Tanzania
- List of schools in Tanzania
