= Khamis (name) =

Khamis is both a surname and a given name. Notable people with the name include:

Surname:

- Abubaker Kaki Khamis (born 1989), Sudanese Olympic middle-distance runner
- Ahmed Khamis (born 1985), Emirati football player
- Buku Khamis (born 2000), South Sudanese-Australian rules footballer
- Imad Khamis (born 1961), Syrian politician
- Johnny Khamis, American politician
- Leena Khamis (born 1986), Australian football player
- Mwajuma Hassan Khamis, Tanzanian politician
- Salem Khamis (born 1980), United Arab Emirates football player
- Sham Khamis (born 1995), Australian football player
- Vuai Abdallah Khamis (born 1960), Tanzanian politician
- Younis Khamis (born 1982), United Arab Emirates basketball player

Given name:

- Khamis Abakar (1964–2023), Sudanese politician, activist, and former army commander
- Khamis Gaddafi (1983–2011), Libyan military commander
- Khamis Bar Qardahe, 13th century Church of the East author
