= Nuru =

Nuru may refer to:

== People ==
- Nuru Awadhi Bafadhili (born 1952), Tanzanian politician
- Nuru Bayramov, surgeon and academic
- Nuru Kane, Senegalese singer
- Sara Nuru (born 1989), German fashion model of Ethiopian descent
- Mohammed Nuru, American former civil servant

== Places ==
- Nuru, Silifke, a village in Mersin Province, Turkey
- Qara Nuru, a village in Saatly District, Azerbaijan

== Other uses ==
- Nuru (massage), a type of erotic massage
- Nuru Energy, a Rwanda-based company
- Nuru International, an NGO working in Kenya and Ethiopia
- Nuru River, in Papua New Guinea
