= Jecha =

Jecha is a surname. Notable people with the surname include:

- Asha Mshimba Jecha (born 1962), Tanzanian politician
- Mwadini Abbas Jecha, Tanzanian politician
- Ralph Jecha (1931–2018), American football player
