= 2013 Chambani by-election =

← 2010	16 June 2013	2015 →

The Chambani constituency in the Tanzanian Parliament
- Turnout: 3,255 (67.34%)
Candidate	Yussuf Salim Hussein	Mathari Saharani
Party	CUF	CCM
Popular vote	2,708	402
Percentage	83.68	12.42
MP before election
Salim Khamis
CUF
Elected MP
Yussuf Salim Hussein
CUF

The Chambani by-election was a by-election held for the Tanzanian parliamentary constituency of Chambani. It was triggered by the death of Salim Khamis, the previous Member of Parliament (MP) who had held the seat for the Civic United Front (CUF) since 2010. The by-election took place on 16 June 2013 and the CUF candidate won by a landslide.

== Results ==
Election	Political result	Candidate	Party	Votes	%	±%
Chambani by-election, 2013; Death of Salim Khamis; 19 spoilt votes Electorate: 4,834; Turnout: 3,255 (67.34%) –23.52	CUF hold Majority: 2,306 (71.26%)	Yussuf Salim Hussein	CUF	2,708	83.68	+7.38
Chambani by-election, 2013; Death of Salim Khamis; 19 spoilt votes Electorate: 4,834; Turnout: 3,255 (67.34%) –23.52	CUF hold Majority: 2,306 (71.26%)	Mathari Saharani	CCM	402	12.42	–1.79
Chambani by-election, 2013; Death of Salim Khamis; 19 spoilt votes Electorate: 4,834; Turnout: 3,255 (67.34%) –23.52	CUF hold Majority: 2,306 (71.26%)	Said Abdallah	ADC	114	3.52	-
Chambani by-election, 2013; Death of Salim Khamis; 19 spoilt votes Electorate: 4,834; Turnout: 3,255 (67.34%) –23.52	CUF hold Majority: 2,306 (71.26%)	Siti Shaibu	Chadema	12	0.37	–0.61
