= Daftari =

Daftari is a surname. Notable people with the surname include:

- Ahmad Matin-Daftari (1897–1971), Iranian politician
- Lisa Daftari, American/Iranian journalist
- Maua Abeid Daftari (born 1953), Government minister of Tanzania
