= Nkunda =

Nkunda is a Congolese and Rwandan surname. Notable people with the name include:

- Elizabeth Nkunda Batenga, Tanzanian politician
- Laurent Nkunda (1967), Democratic Republic of the Congo politician
- Mutiganda Wa Nkunda (1989), Rwandan filmmaker
- Patience Nkunda Kinshaba, Ugandan politician
- Paulina Mateus Nkunda (1952–2013), Mozambican women's activist, veteran of the war of independence and politician
