= Titus Kamani =

Tanzanian politician

Minister of Livestock and Fisheries Development
- In office 20 January 2014 – 5 November 2015
- President: Jakaya Kikwete
- Preceded by: David Mathayo David

Member of Parliament for Busega
- In office November 2010 – July 2015
- Preceded by: Raphael Chegeni
- Succeeded by: Raphael Chegeni

Personal details
- Born: 14 November 1957 (age 68) Tanganyika
- Party: CCM
- Education: Sokoine University (BSc); University of Reading (MSc); Mweka College (PGDip)

Titus Mlengeya Dismas Kamani (born 14 November 1957) is a Tanzanian CCM politician and Member of Parliament for Busega constituency since 2010. He is the current Minister of Livestock and Fisheries Development.
