= Kabuye =

Kabuye is a Ugandan surname. Notable people with the surname include:

- Kabuye Frank Kibirige (born 1997), Ugandan politician, farmer, humanitarian and businessman
- Christine H. Sophie Kabuye (born 1938), Ugandan ethnobotanist
- Rose Kabuye (born 1961), Lieutenant Colonel in the Rwandan Army
- Calvin Kabuye (born 2003), Ugandan footballer
- Phares Kashemeza Kabuye (died 2009), Tanzanian Member of Parliament
