= Faki =

Faki is a surname. Notable people with the surname include:

- Ali Faki (born 1964), Malawian boxer
- Bakari Shamis Faki (born 1939), Tanzanian politician
- Haji Faki, Tanzanian politician
- Len Faki, German DJ and producer
- Moussa Faki (born 1960), Chadian politician and diplomat
