= Mwinyi =

Mwinyi may refer to:

== People ==
- Abdullah Mwinyi (born 1974), Tanzanian judge
- Ali Hassan Mwinyi (1925–2024), Tanzanian head of State
- Hussein Mwinyi (born 1966), Tanzanian politician in Zanzibar
- Omar Mwinyi (born 1958), Kenyan politician
- Rajab Mwinyi (born 1984), Burundian footballer
- Siti Mwinyi (born 1932), Tanzanian first lady

== First name ==
- Mwinyi Kazimoto (born 1988), Tanzanian footballer
