= Fatma Abdulhabib Fereji =

Tanzanian politician

Fatma Abdulhabib Fereji is a Zanzibar ACT Wazalendo politician and a former Member of Parliament in the National Assembly of Tanzania.
