= List of ambassadors of Tanzania to China =

Coordinates: 39.945722°N 116.457817°E

Ambassador of Tanzania to China
- Incumbent; Mbelwa Kairuki since March 17, 2017
- Inaugural holder: Tewa Said Tewa
- Formation: 1965

The Tanzanian Ambassador in Beijing is the official representative of the Government in Dodoma to the Government of China.

== List of representatives ==
diplomatic agreement/designated/Diplomatic accreditation	ambassador	Observations	List of heads of state of Tanzania	Premier of the People's Republic of China	Term end
1965	Alhaj Tewa Said Tewa		Julius Nyerere	Zhou Enlai	1965
1965	Waziri Juma		Julius Nyerere	Zhou Enlai	1966
1967	Paul Eliel Mwaluko		Julius Nyerere	Zhou Enlai	1969
1969	Salim Ahmed Salim		Julius Nyerere	Zhou Enlai	1969
1970	Richard S. Wambura		Julius Nyerere	Zhou Enlai	1975
1975	Job Malecela Lusinde		Julius Nyerere	Zhou Enlai	1984
September 5, 1984	Clement George Kahama		Julius Nyerere	Zhao Ziyang	
July 24, 1989	Ferdinand К. Ruhinda	Kamuntu Ferdinand Ruhinda, former Managing Editor of the Daily News in Tanzania	Ali Hassan Mwinyi	Li Peng	
July 14, 1993	Seif Ali Iddi		Ali Hassan Mwinyi	Li Peng	
March 17, 2000	Charles Asilia Sanga		Benjamin William Mkapa	Zhu Rongji	
November 14, 2006	Oraar Ramadhan Mapuri		Jakaya Kikwete	Wen Jiabao	
May 23, 2012	Philip Marmo		Jakaya Kikwete	Wen Jiabao	
June 12,2013	Luteni Jenerali Mstaafu Abdulrahman Shimbo		Jakaya Kikwete		
January 07,2017	Mbelwa Brighton Kairuki .		John_Magufuli		

- China–Tanzania relations
