= Laus Omar Mhina =

Tanzanian politician

Laus Omar Mhina (born 1 October 1952) is a Tanzanian CCM politician and Member of Parliament for Korogwe Rural constituency in the National Assembly of Tanzania since 2005.
