= Faida Mohamed Bakar =

Tanzanian politician

- Born: 20 March 1963 (age 63)
- Occupation: Politician
- Known for: Member of Parliament in the National Assembly of Tanzania
- Political party: Chama Cha Mapinduzi

Faida Mohamed Bakar (born 20 March 1963) is a Member of Parliament in the National Assembly of Tanzania. She has held a special seat in the parliament for three terms (2000–2005, 2005–2010, and 2010–2015), and has also served as an official in the Chama Cha Mapinduzi, the ruling party of Tanzania.
