= Suleiman Omar Kumchaya =

Tanzanian politician

Suleiman Omar Kumchaya (born 11 May 1952) is a Tanzanian CCM politician and Member of Parliament for Lulindi constituency in the National Assembly of Tanzania since 2005. He also worked as the president's political advisor in the State House.
