= Maida Abdallah =

Tanzanian politician

Member of the Tanzanian Parliament
- In office 2005–2010
- Constituency: Special Seat

Personal details
- Born: 17 January 1975 (age 51)
- Party: CCM
- Education: Kizimbani Primary School; Utaani Secondary School

Maida Hamad Abdallah (born January 17, 1975) is a Member of Parliament in the National Assembly of Tanzania. She has been the District Secretary of the ruling Chama Cha Mapinduzi party since 2005. She is also the District Secretary of the Tanzania Parents Association. District Accountant to

Regional Wazazi.

various Evaluation

Committees.

Education:

Diploma in Business

Management and

Administration
