= Issa Kassim Issa =

Tanzanian politician (1957–2021)

Issa Kassim Issa (18 January 1957 – 18 December 2021), known as Baharia, was a Tanzanian politician. From 2005 to 2010, he represented the Mpendae constituency in the National Assembly of Tanzania as a member of the Chama Cha Mapinduzi (CCM) party, having joined CCM in 1977.

He was born in Uroa in 1957 and died in hospital in Dar es Salaam in 2021.

== See also ==
- List of Tanzania National Assembly members
