= Juma Duni Haji =

Tanzanian politician

Chairman of ACT-Wazalendo Party
- Incumbent
- Assumed office 2021
- Preceded by: Seif Sharif Hamad

Minister for Infrastructure and Communications, Zanzibar
- In office 2014 – 1 August 2015
- President: Ali Mohamed Shein

Minister for Health, Zanzibar
- In office November 2010 – 2014
- President: Ali Mohamed Shein

Member of the Zanzibar House of Representatives
- In office 2009–2015
- Appointed by: Amani Abeid Karume; Ali Mohamed Shein
- In office 1997–2000
- Constituency: Mkunazini

Personal details
- Born: 26 November 1950 (age 75) Sultanate of Zanzibar
- Party: Alliance for Change and Transparency (2019-present); CHADEMA (2015–2015); CUF (1994/5–2015)
- Education: University of Dar es Salaam; University of Manchester
- Profession: Teacher
- Nickname: Babu Duni

Juma Duni Haji (born 26 November 1950) is a Tanzanian politician and former civil servant. He is the Chairperson of ACT Wazalendo. He previously served as the Deputy Chairman of the Civic United Front from 2014 to 2015.

He was selected as the running mate of Edward Lowassa, the CHADEMA presidential candidate for the 2015 election, which necessitated his defection.

== Early life and career ==
Duni was born in Kibeni village in Mkwajuni. He was educated at Mkwajuni Primary School (1959–65) and at Gamal Abdel Nassar (present-day Beit el Ras) Secondary School (1966–69). He pursued his A-levels at Lumumba Secondary School from 1970 to 1971. He was elected as the chairperson of the Afro-Shirazi Party Youth League at Lumumba College. He then joined the University of Dar es Salaam and graduated with a BSc in education in 1975.

After graduation, he was employed as a teacher. Ismail Jussa was one of his students. In 1978, he left for England to study at the University of Reading (advanced diploma) and later joined the Zanzibar Ministry of Education as a planning officer.

In 1980, Zanzibari President Aboud Jumbe appointed him as the Permanent Secretary of the Planning Ministry and was later promoted as the Executive Secretary of the Planning Commission. He obtained his masters in human resource management from the University of Manchester in 1995.

== Political career ==
Following the end of one-party system in the 1990s, Duni joined the opposition Civic United Front party. He was the thrice running mate of the party's perennial candidate Ibrahim Lipumba, in the 1995, 2005 and 2010 presidential elections.

In 1997, he won the Mkunazini by-election to the Zanzibar House of Representatives (ZHoR). On the last day of the campaign, some opposition supporters were arrested and charged first with sedition and then treason. He too was arrested, and Amnesty International designated him a prisoner of conscience. The Court of Appeal ruled that a treasonous offence cannot be committed "against Zanzibar as [it] is not a sovereign state." President Salmin Amour ordered their release just before the end of his tenure in 2000.

In 2009, President Amani Abeid Karume nominated him to the ZHoR. Following the 2010 election, President Ali Mohamed Shein appointed him as the Zanzibari Minister for Health, and following a minor cabinet reshuffle in 2014, he was transferred to the Infrastructure and Communications docket.

He resigned as Minister in August 2015, following his tactical defection to the opposition CHADEMA party as he was selected as the running mate of former Prime Minister Edward Lowassa, the presidential candidate of the opposition coalition. CUF Secretary-General Seif Sharif Hamad said that Duni was reluctant to defect.
