= Vice President of Zanzibar =

Political position in Zanzibar

- Makamu wa Rais wa Zanzibar
- Flag of Zanzibar
- Incumbent; First: Othman Masoud Sharif; Second: Hemed Suleiman Abdalla
- Member of: Cabinet of Zanzibar
- Seat: Zanzibar
- Appointer: President of Zanzibar
- Constituting instrument: Constitution of Zanzibar
- Formation: 2010
- First holder: Seif Shariff Hamad

The vice president of Zanzibar (Swahili: Makamu wa Rais wa Zanzibar) is a political position in Zanzibar. The vice presidency was created by the 2010 amendments made to the Zanzibar Constitution. First Vice President is supposed to come from a political party other than that of the President of Zanzibar. According to the Constitution, the Second Vice President is supposed to be a member of the Zanzibar House of Representatives, and must come from the same political party as the President.

The vice presidency could be considered only ceremonial.

== Vice presidents of Zanzibar ==
No.	Image	Office Holder	Took office	Left office	Notes
1		Abdullah Kassim Hanga	1964	1967	

=== First Vice President ===
No.	Image	Office Holder	Took office	Left office	Notes
1		Seif Sharif Hamad	November 2010	March 2016	
-		Vacant	March 2016	December 2020	
(1)		Seif Sharif Hamad	December 2020	17 February 2021	Died in office
2		Othman Masoud Sharif	2 March 2021	Incumbent	

=== Second Vice President ===
No.	Image	Office Holder	Took office	Left office	Notes
1		Seif Ali Iddi	November 2010	November 2020	
2		Hemed Suleiman Abdalla	November 2020	Incumbent	

== See also ==
- Zanzibar
  - Politics of Zanzibar
  - President of Zanzibar
- Lists of office-holders
