= Kibaha Secondary School =

Location
- Kibaha, Kibaha District, Pwani Region; Tanzania
- Coordinates: 6.7868957°S 38.969090°E

Information
- School type: Boys-only secondary
- Motto: Struggle for Success
- Established: 1964 (62 years ago)
- Grades: 9 to 12
- Website: https://kibahasec.sc.tz/

Kibaha Secondary School is a Tanzanian all-boys secondary school located in Kibaha, Kibaha District, Pwani Region.

== History and operations ==
It was established in 1965.

With a capacity of 612 students, the school admitted the first intake of form one and five students in 1965. By 30 March 1999, the school had a total enrollment of 771.

The school is an institution admitting academically gifted young people from all over Tanzania.

=== CSEE results ===
(Certificate of Secondary Education Examination)

Year	Number of students	Position regionwise	Position nationwise
2012	108	3rd	18th
2013	97	4th	44th
2014	103	5th	87th
2015	116	4th	69th

=== ACSEE results ===
Year	Number of students	Position Regionwise	Position nationwise
2012	193	2nd	4th
2013	184	2nd	9th
2014	167	1st	5th

== Notable alumni ==
- Jakaya Mrisho Kikwete, President of Tanzania.
- Lazaro Nyalandu, Former Minister Natural Resources and Tourism

== See also ==
- Education in Tanzania
- List of schools in Tanzania
