= Shaffin Sumar =

Tanzanian CCM politician and former MP

Honourable Shaffin Sumar MP

Member of Parliament for Tabora North
- In office November 2010 – 2015
- Preceded by: James Msekela

Personal details
- Born: 26 May 1971 (age 54)
- Party: CCM

Shaffin Ahmedali Sumar (born 26 May 1971) is a Tanzanian CCM politician and was Member of Parliament for Tabora North constituency since 2010 to 2015.
