= Charles Muguta Kajege =

Tanzanian politician (born 1962)

Charles Muguta Kajege (born June 3, 1962) is a Member of Parliament in the National Assembly of Tanzania.
