= Stephen Jones Galinoma =

Tanzanian politician

Stephen Jones Galinoma is a Member of Parliament in the National Assembly of Tanzania, representing Kalenga. He belongs to the Chama Cha Mapinduzi (CCM) party.
