= Zuleikha Yunus Haji =

Tanzanian politician

Zuleikha Haji

Member of the Tanzanian Parliament
- In office 2005–2010
- Constituency: Special Seat

Personal details
- Born: 5 January 1956 (age 70) Sultanate of Zanzibar
- Party: CCM

Zuleikha Yunus Haji is a Member of Parliament in the National Assembly of Tanzania. She occupies a special women's seat, and is a member of the ruling party – Chama Cha Mapinduzi – from Zanzibar.
