= Castor Raphael Ligallama =

Tanzanian politician

Castor Raphael Ligallama (born 1 March 1949) is a Tanzanian CCM politician and Member of Parliament for Kilombero constituency in the National Assembly of Tanzania since 2005.
