= Selemani Jafo =

Tanzanian politician

Honourable Selemani mwakilasa Jafo MP

Minister of State in the President’s Office
- Incumbent
- Assumed office 9 October 2017 Serving with George Mkuchika
- President: John Magufuli

Member of Parliament for Kisarawe
- Incumbent
- Assumed office November 2010
- Preceded by: Athumani S. Janguo

Personal details
- Born: 26 May 1973 (age 53)
- Party: CCM
- Education: Sokoine University (BSc); SNHU

Selemani Saidi Jafo (born 26 May 1973) is a Tanzanian CCM politician. He has been a Member of Parliament for the Kisarawe constituency since 2010.

He is also a Minister of State in the President's Office – Regional Administration and Local Government since 2017.
