= Bernadeta Mushashu =

Tanzanian politician

Honourable Bernadeta Mushashu MP

Member of Parliament for Special Seats
- In office 2005–2025

Personal details
- Party: Chama Cha Mapinduzi
- Education: University of Dar es Salaam (BS); University of New Brunswick (MEd)

Bernadeta Kasabago Mushashu is a Tanzanian politician and schoolteacher who served as a Chama Cha Mapinduzi women special seats member of the National Assembly from 2005 to 2025. Prior to this, she was a secondary school teacher who served as headmistress of Bukoba Secondary School (1995–2000) and Rugambwa Secondary School (2000–2005).

== Biography ==
Bernadeta Kasabago Mushashu received her CPEE from Katoma Primary School in 1968, her CSEE from Rugambwa Secondary School in 1972, and her ACSEE from Kilakala Secondary School in 1974. After obtaining a diploma from Chang'ombe Teachers' Training College in 1977, she obtained a Bachelor of Science degree in education from the University of Dar es Salaam in 1982 and master's degree in education from the University of New Brunswick in 1994. Outside of education, she worked as a training officer for Kilombero Sugar (1978–1979) as well as a supplies and training officer for Kagera Sugar (1985–1989).

Mushashu worked as a teacher in several secondary schools, namely Ifakara (1977–1978), Kilakala (1982–1985), and Bukoba (1988). In 1989, she was promoted to deputy headmistress at Bukoba Secondary, serving until 1992. In 1995, she became headmistress of Bukoba Secondary, serving until 2000, when she moved to Rugambwa Secondary to become headmistress there. In 2005, her tenure as headmistress ended.

In 2005, Mushashu was elected Chama Cha Mapinduzi MP for the women special seats. In 2013, she served as the deputy chair of a parliamentary committee on Form Four exams. In 2016, she questioned Selemani Jafo on the government's debt to contractors involved in the country's free primary education programme. In 2024, she was acting chair of the Parliamentary Standing Committee on HIV and AIDS, where she called for government prioritization of high-risk malaria regions. Following three re-elections in 2010, 2015, and 2020, she left Parliament in 2025.
