= Ania Said Chaurembo =

Tanzanian politician

Ania Said Chaurembo is a former member of Parliament in the National Assembly of Tanzania, representing the Civic United Front party.
