= Janet Bina Kahama =

Tanzanian politician (born 1943)

Janet Bina Kahama (born May 19, 1943) is a Member of Parliament in the National Assembly of Tanzania.
