= Feetham Filipo Banyikwa =

Tanzanian politician

Feetham Filipo Banyikwa was a Member of Parliament in the National Assembly of Tanzania for the Ngara constituency.

Born in Tanzania, Banyikwa spent his professional life supporting and helping his nation's citizens, and has a background in both law and politics.
