= Maria Ibeshi Hewa =

Tanzanian politician (born 1950)

Maria Ibeshi Hewa (born 10 June 1950) is a Member of Parliament in the National Assembly of Tanzania.

== Sources ==
- Parliament of Tanzania profile
