= Ame Pandu Ame =

Tanzanian politician

- Born: 1 January 1963 (age 63)
- Occupation: Member of Parliament

Ame Pandu Ame (born 1 January 1963) is a Member of Parliament in the National Assembly of Tanzania.
