= Mohamed Rished Abdallah =

Tanzanian politician

Personal details
- Born: March 28, 1952 (age 72)
- Political party: Chama Cha Mapinduzi

Mohamed Rished Abdallah (born March 28, 1952) was a Member of Parliament in the National Assembly of Tanzania, representing Pangani. He served as a member of Chama Cha Mapinduzi. He completed a short training in engineering at the University of Baghdad in 1973.
