= Diana Mkumbo Chilolo =

Tanzanian politician

Diana Mkumbo Chilolo (born 14 April 1954) is a Member of Parliament in the National Assembly of Tanzania. She has been a member since 2000. She is a member of the Chama Cha Mapinduzi (CCM) party.
