= Saleh Ali Farrah =

Tanzanian politician

Saleh Ali Farrah is a former Member of Parliament in the National Assembly of Tanzania.
