= Clemence Beatus Lyamba =

Tanzanian politician

Clemence Beatus Lyamba (born 16 February 1946) is a Tanzanian CCM politician and Member of Parliament for Mikumi constituency in the National Assembly of Tanzania from 2005 to 2010. Then Abdulsalaam Amer won after next elections.
