= Meryce Mussa Emmanuel =

Tanzanian politician

Meryce Mussa Emmanuel is a former Member of Parliament in the National Assembly of Tanzania, elected in 2005 for the Civic United Front party.
