= Feteh Saad Mgeni =

Tanzanian politician

Feteh Saad Mgeni is a Tanzanian CCM politician and Member of Parliament for Bumbwini constituency in the National Assembly of Tanzania since 2005.
