= Joel Bendera =

Tanzanian politician

Honourable Joel Nkaya Bendera

Regional Commissioner
- Constituency: Morogoro

Personal details
- Born: 30 May 1950 (age 76)
- Died: 6 December 2017
- Party: Chama Cha Mapinduzi

Joel Nkaya Bendera (30 May 1950 – 7 December 2017) was a Tanzanian politician who was Member of Parliament for the Morogoro Region, in the National Assembly of Tanzania. He worked as the deputy Minister of Information, Culture and Sports since 2006.

== Biography ==
Jole Bendera was a former football player and also a former trainer. He was the coach of Tanzania during more than ten years. He was the coach who clinch the only qualification of Tanzania for the African Nations Cup: "Nigeria 1980".

As Morogoro Regional Commissioner, Bendera worked on numerous initiatives to improve various farming sectors in the region. In 2013 he worked with tobacco companies, and praised them for being 'job creators' in the local area, and the next year he attempted to push initiatives to allow farmers better access to weather reporting systems as a measure to reduce disasters cause by flooding and climate change. In the same vein, he called for pastoralists to be forcibly evicted from the region after an order to voluntarily relocate was ignored. He cited conflicts with local farmers and environmental issues caused by illegal grazing as the main cause of the evictions.

Bendera died on 7 December 2012.
