= Ali Haji Ali =

Tanzanian politician

Member of the Tanzanian Parliament
- In office 2005–2010
- Constituency: Zanzibar HoR

Personal details
- Born: 7 April 1948 (age 78)
- Party: CCM

Ali Haji Ali (born April 7, 1948 or March 11, 1950) is a Member of Parliament in the National Assembly of Tanzania. He is a member of the ruling Chama Cha Mapinduzi party and was its Secretary General in 1989. He is a member of the Zanzibar House of Representatives.
