= Ali Tarab Ali =

Tanzanian politician

- Born: July 20, 1947 (age 78)
- Known for: Former Shadow Minister for Health and Social Welfare

Dr. Ali Tarab Ali (born July 20, 1947) is a Member of Parliament in the National Assembly of Tanzania and is the Shadow Minister for Health and Social Welfare. He received a master's degree and Ph.D., both in biochemistry, from Kharkov State University in the Soviet Union (now Kharkiv University in Ukraine). Prior to being a member of Parliament, Ali was a biochemist within the Ministry of Health for Zanzibar and a lecturer at Muhimbili University College of Health Science. He is also a lecturer for biochemistry at Hurbert kairuki memorial university (HKMU). His students includes Mtenga (Revised by Rx).
