= Jason Fairbourne =

American entrepreneur

Jason Fairbourne is an American entrepreneur and social innovator. He is best known for founding greentech platform Yoodlize and developing the concept of microfranchising while teaching at Brigham Young University and running Fairbourne Consulting Group.

== Early life and education ==
Jason was born in Bountiful, Utah on Aug. 22, 1973 to Vickie Robertson Fairbourne and Michael Scott Fairbourne. He is the oldest of three children. Jason was an active young man, playing football, baseball and basketball at Bountiful High School. He had a deep sense of adventure that attracted him to activities like skiing, mountain biking, surfing, kayaking, rock climbing and, later in life, traveling across the world.

Jason graduated with a sociology degree from Utah Valley State College in 2003 (now Utah Valley University), the first in his family to earn a college diploma, though it took him 10 years to do so as he worked his way through school, working summers as a backcountry wilderness guide and firefighter in the Mountain West and winters as a ski instructor and manager at Sundance Resort.

While a ski instructor, Jason met Natalie Pope on the mountain. The two married on Oct 12, 1999 when Jason was 26 and Natalie was 20. The couple spent a 6-month “honeymoon” volunteering for NGO Choice Humanitarian in Kenya, where they helped build environmentally friendly cook stoves that used less wood and fuel than the more common open-flame cooking fires.

Prior to meeting Natalie, Jason took a 3-month long solo backpacking trip throughout southeast Asia, including Thailand, India and Nepal, where he hiked to Mt. Everest’s South Base Camp. Throughout his journey, Jason encountered extreme poverty among its inhabitants and felt inspired to take school and life more seriously, committing himself to using entrepreneurship to help those in need.

Propelled by his newfound purpose, in 2003 Jason and Natalie moved to England where Jason attended the London School of Economics and Political Science. Jason completed a dissertation on business in emerging markets and graduated in 2005 with a Master of Sciences degree in development management.

== University teaching ==
After graduating from LSE, Jason went on to work as a visiting research associate professor at Brigham Young University in Provo, Utah. From 2005-2009, Jason served as the Director of Business Solutions for Development and founder of the Microfranchise Development Initiative at the university. In this role, Jason taught students the systematization and replication of microenterprises in developing markets, proven by his experiences with his own consultancy, Fairbourne Consulting, which worked with Fortune 500 clients to help launch and scale 30+ micro-enterprises in developing economies.

Jason’s microfranchising work stemmed from an internship with the World Bank in 2003, where he conducted the organization’s first-ever impact assessment on microfinance. His results showed that many micro-loan recipients didn’t know how to deploy their newfound capital in a way that resulted in long-term, beneficial gains. During his internship, Jason realized he could create a better way to scale new businesses in developing economies following a franchise model that provided training in business management principles and processes rather than leaving loan recipients to figure out entrepreneurship with few resources.

During his tenure at BYU, Jason coined the term “microfranchising” as the systematization and replication of microenterprises in developing markets, and further developed the concept, which is widely accepted today. As a result of his work in microfranchising, Jason was named the first Peery Fellow of Social Entrepreneurship by BYU’s Marriott School of Business and continued in that capacity until 2015.

From 2011-2013 Jason also worked as an adjunct professor at the Monterey Institute of National Studies, a graduate school of Middlebury College in Monterey, California, and served as a member of The Faculty Council for the Center for Financial Inclusion, which consisted of academics from premier national and international professional schools who used rigorous research and advocacy to advance inclusive financial systems for low-income people around the world.

During his time in academia, Jason became well known for his work as a microfranchising innovator. He promoted the idea that microfranchise must be microscalable: achievable and repeatable with severely limited financial and professional resources. He authored a textbook with Stephen Gibson and W. Gibb Dyer titled, “MicroFranchising: Creating Wealth at the Bottom of the Pyramid,” that described the evolution of microfranchising as what was then a new social movement that hastened people’s movement from the ranks of poverty, through microenterprise, and into capital accumulation and asset building.

Jason’s work also appeared in case studies published in the 2011 book “Microfranchising: How Social Entrepreneurs are Building a New Road to Development,” by Clint P. Rogers, Jason Fairbourne and Robert C. Wolcott, and “Institutional Case Studies on Necessity Entrepreneurship,” edited by Jeremi Brewer and Stephen W. Gibson (2016).

Additionally, Jason has co-authored several articles in respected journals including “Building Entrepreneurship in Subsistence Markets: Microfranchising as an Employment Incubator” in the Journal of Business Research (2010), “A Good Business for Poor People” in the Stanford Social Innovation Review (2010) and “Microfranchising: A New Tool for Creating Economic Self-Reliance” in BYU’s Journal of Microfinance (2005).

== Fairbourne Consulting ==
While teaching, Jason founded Fairbourne Consulting, which helped both nonprofit and for-profit corporations design and grow businesses in emerging and developing markets. Clients included the International Rescue Committee, U.S. Department of State, Nike Foundation, Nestle and Mastercard. From 2007 to 2016, Jason helped these and other organizations create more than 30 businesses in 15 countries, using innovative ways to alleviate poverty through for-profit business models, such as microfranchising. Those small businesses helped create jobs for ex-child soldiers in Sierra Leone, Sudanese refugees who were forced into prostitution, impoverished Jamaicans, and Iraqi widows whose husbands were casualties of war. Fairbourne Consulting focused on training these new entrepreneurs so their ventures would be sustainable and successful in the long term. He spoke about his work at the first TedX Salt Lake City with his talk, “Designing Business Models for the Poor” in June 2011.

== Motiis ==
In the summer of 2013, Jason and his family moved to Kenya, where he launched a social enterprise business incubator called Motiis, with a goal to create businesses in developing economies that reaped profits for both investors and locals. In Mombasa, Jason started two such businesses: a chain of supermarkets called Bestway, and a clean packaged water company, Bamba Water, which used 1/13th the amount of plastic used for a water bottle at half the price of competitors.

While in Kenya, the Fairbournes “world-schooled” their three children, Porter, Alta and Everett. This included studying about the economy and culture of a country, then traveling there for first-hand experience. Their education also included business lessons that taught entrepreneurship.

When Jason and Natalie decided to move back to their native Utah in 2018, they assigned one final project to their children, then 16, 14 and 12 years old: come up with the family’s next entrepreneurial venture they could execute back in the U.S.

While the boys’ ramen shop and donut delivery service ideas had promise, it was 14-year-old daughter Alta’s idea that stuck. As she reflected on the family’s worldwide travels, Alta asked her dad, “Remember when you were looking for a surfboard so we could hit the waves in Norway? Or that time we had to buy a skateboard for that one outing in Amsterdam? Or how about in Japan when you wanted a telephoto lens for skiing and said, ‘Somebody in Japan must have a Canon lens I could borrow for the day.”

Alta listed off a handful of other things they had needed during their “world-school” traveling, things that locals certainly had. “People use platforms like Airbnb to find homes or Uber to find rides---why don’t we create a platform where people can find stuff?”

== Yoodlize ==
Back in Provo, Utah in 2018, Jason secured $100K from an angel investor and enlisted the help of technical co-founder (and cousin) Jeremy Robertson, who was a director at a prominent design and coding bootcamp, to build such a platform, which was named Yoodlize after the phonetic spelling of “utilize.”

Yoodlize soft launched in Utah’s two most populous counties in mid-2019, just before the COVID-19 pandemic swept the world. While many other businesses suffered, Yoodlize survived as people still sought out fun experiences while social distancing, and accounts grew to several thousand by year’s end. The company’s app continued to gain traction during the inflationary times that followed as users desired to make extra money renting out things they already owned, or save money renting items instead of buying them at marked-up prices. During this time, the company’s signature blue school bus/mobile office was a staple as it roamed throughout Utah’s Wasatch Front.

Yoodlize’s next market launches were in California and Hawaii in 2023, though it was also seeing steady user accounts created all across the country due to social media buzz, referrals and word of mouth.

While the consumer market was responsive, venture capitalists were pulling back on funding. Instead of tapping into VC, Yoodlize’s operating costs were covered by a $233K crowdfunding campaign in 2021 and an $800K pre-seed angel round in 2023. These investors, like Jason and his team, understood that consumer mindsets were shifting to value affordable access over ownership. Their key psychographic wanted to be responsible consumers that are reducing their carbon footprints and supporting their local communities, all while making or saving money along the way.

As of early 2024, Yoodlize was operational and growing across the United States as it sought to raise seed funding.

== Honors and awards ==
- 2023: Utah Valley Business Q Entrepreneur of the Year
- 2010: BYU Ballard Center First Peery Fellow of Social Entrepreneurship

== Published works ==
Books and articles by Jason Fairbourne:

- 2016: “Institutional Case Studies on Necessity Entrepreneurship,” edited by Jeremi Brewer and Stephen W. Gibson
- 2011: “MicroFranchising: Creating Wealth at the Bottom of the Pyramid edited by Jason Fairbourne, Stephen Gibson and W. Gibb Dyer, Edward Elgar Pub, 2008, ISBN 978-1-84844-053-1
- 2011: “Microfranchising: How Social Entrepreneurs are Building a New Road to Development,” chapter 4, "The diffusions of innovations through microfranchising,"by Clint P. Rogers, Jason Fairbourne and Robert C. Wolcott
- 2010: “Building Entrepreneurship in Subsistence Markets: Microfranchising as an Employment Incubator” in the Journal of Business Research
- 2010: “A Good Business for Poor People” with Lisa J. Christensen, and David Lehr in the Stanford Social Innovation Review, 43-49.
- 2007: "Microfranchising," Marriott Alumni Magazine, Marriott School, Brigham Young University
- 2005: “Microfranchising: A New Tool for Creating Economic Self-Reliance,” BYU Journal of Microfinance

== Appearances, interviews and presentations ==
- March 13, 2024: “Silicon Slopes Live Show: Jason Fairbourne,” Silicon Slopes Show
- Dec. 11, 2023: “Yoodlize, the Rent Anything App. Talking with Founder Jason Fairbourne,” The San Francisco Experience podcast
- May 16, 2023: “Episode 205: Jason Fairbourne, Yoodlize,” Meat and Potatoes Podcast
- July 19, 2022: “Rent outdoor gear from your neighbor for cheap,” Fresh Living, KUTV channel 2
- Dec. 6, 2021: “A Conversation with the Founder of Yoodlize,” Business Elevated Podcast
- March 26, 2021: “Jason Fairbourne of Yoodlize,” TechBuzz News
- July 8, 2020: “Renting Your Stuff With Yoodlize,” Apodcast.com
- June 20, 2011: “Designing Business Models for the Poor,” Ted Talk, TedX Salt Lake City
