= Microfranchising =

Business model involving small businesses

Microfranchising is a business model that applies elements and concepts of traditional franchising to small businesses in the developing world. It refers to the systemization and replication of micro-enterprises. Microfranchising is broadly defined as small businesses that can easily be replicated by following proven marketing and operational concepts.

According to Acumen Fund, microfranchising is "a development tool that leverages the basic concepts of traditional franchising, but it is especially focused on creating opportunities for the world’s poorest people to own and manage their own businesses." The objective of microfranchising is to promote economic development by developing sound business models that can be replicated by entrepreneurs at the base of the socio-economic pyramid (bottom of the pyramid), thereby providing self-employment opportunities to those who lack entrepreneurial skills. Key principles include replication, sustainability, and social impact.

In developing countries, microfranchising attempts to solve the dilemma of the "necessity entrepreneur" by providing job opportunities to those who lack fundamental entrepreneurial skills. Many companies and organizations provide business opportunities and services to the poor by introducing scaled-down business concepts found in successful franchise organizations. Although it is sometimes seen as a new development in the social enterprise sector that follows in the footsteps of microfinance and microcredit, a form of microfranchising may have developed concurrently with microcredit in Bangladesh.

== Background ==
According to a 2012 article in Innovations, a peer-reviewed academic journal, microfranchising "has its origins in Bangladesh’s system of community health promoters, or shasthya shebikas in Bengali, which is the core of BRAC’s approach to providing low-cost health care."

Advocates of microfranchising include Jason Fairbourne, Stephen W. Gibson, W. Gibb Dyer and other faculty and students at the Brigham Young University's Marriott School of Management, who have also been involved in microcredit, microfinance, and other microenterprise development activities.

A large percentage of the world's population has no choice but to survive on earnings from their own micro-enterprises. A 2002 report from the International Labor Organization indicated that 72% of sub-Saharan Africa's population, 51% of Latin America's population, and 65% of Asia's population operates within the informal sector. Moreover, self-employment represented 70% of informal employment in sub-Saharan Africa, 62% in North Africa, 60% in Latin America, and 59% in Asia.

Many small businesses operated by people in developing countries fail or exist on subsistence levels. Microfranchising is a tool designed specifically to assist these entrepreneurs to become more successful and reach economic self-reliance, through the provision of successful business models with the necessary initial and on-going training needed to succeed. Companies such as Bomgi Ltd. offer initial and on-going business training to their franchisees. Such companies have chosen to train franchisees in areas of business including leadership, entrepreneurship, marketing, sales, customer service, and finance.

== Examples ==
Examples of microfranchises include BRAC's community promoters (in health, agriculture, legal services and other areas), Nuru Energy Entrepreneurs (East Africa and India), Village Phone Program by Grameenphone, Living Goods (Uganda), and Fan Milk Limited (Ghana).
