= Ramadhani Athumani Maneno =

Tanzanian politician

Ramadhani Athumani Maneno is a Tanzanian CCM politician and Member of Parliament for Chalinze constituency in the National Assembly of Tanzania since 2005.
