= Gideon Asimulike Cheyo =

Tanzanian politician

Gideon Asimulike Cheyo (born 24 December 1939) is a Tanzanian politician and a Member of Parliament in the National Assembly of Tanzania. He was Minister of Lands & Human Resettlement.
