= Ameir Ali Ameir =

Tanzanian MP

National Assembly of Tanzania
- Incumbent
- Assumed office 2005

Personal details
- Born: 23 September 1961 (age 63)
- Political party: Chama Cha Mapinduzi

Ameir Ali Ameir (born 23 September 1961) is a Member of Parliament in the National Assembly of Tanzania.

Ameir was first elected to the Tanzanian National Assembly in 2005, after five years as internal auditor for the Ministry of State.
