= Hassan Chande Kigwalilo =

Tanzanian politician

Hassan Chande Kigwalilo is a former Member of Parliament in the National Assembly of Tanzania.
