= Hassan Rajab Khatib =

Tanzanian politician

Hassan Rajab Khatib (born January 1, 1946) is a former Member of Parliament in the National Assembly of Tanzania.
