= Abdisalaam Issa Khatib =

Tanzanian politician

Abdisalaam Issa Khatib is a Member of Parliament in the National Assembly of Tanzania.

== See also ==
- List of Tanzania National Assembly members 2005–2010
