= Lazaro Nyalandu =

Tanzanian politician

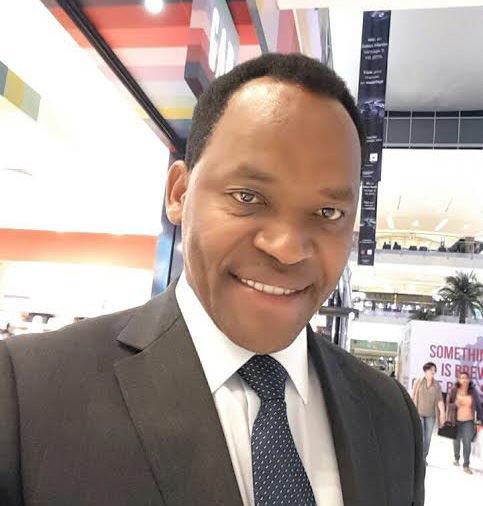

Minister of Natural Resources and Tourism
- In office 20 January 2014 – 5 November 2015
- President: Jakaya Kikwete
- Preceded by: Khamis Kagasheki
- In office 7 May 2012 – 20 January 2014
- Minister: Khamis Kagasheki
- Succeeded by: Mahmoud Mgimwa

Minister of Industry, Trade and Marketing
- In office 28 November 2010 – 7 May 2012
- Minister: Cyril Chami

Member of Parliament for Singida North
- In office November 2000 – November 2015
- Succeeded by: Mayrose Majige

Personal details
- Born: 18 August 1970 (age 56)
- Party: Chama Cha Mapinduzi
- Other political affiliations: CHADEMA (2015-2021)
- Spouse: Faraja
- Children: 2
- Education: (BA); Wartburg College (BA); University of Buckingham (MA)
- Twitter handle: @LazaroNyalandu
- Website: Official website

Lazaro Samuel Nyalandu (born 18 August 1970) is a Tanzanian politician, diplomat, and former Cabinet Minister. He is currently serving as Ambassador and Advisor to the President of the United Republic of Tanzania on Diplomatic Affairs.

He previously served as Member of Parliament for Singida North constituency from 2000 to 2015 and held ministerial positions including Deputy Minister for Industry and Trade and Minister for Natural Resources and Tourism.

As Minister for Natural Resources and Tourism from 2014 to 2015, Nyalandu oversaw Tanzania’s wildlife, forestry, and tourism portfolios and represented the country in regional and international engagements related to conservation and tourism. In 2015, he sought the nomination of the ruling Chama Cha Mapinduzi (CCM) party for the presidency of the United Republic of Tanzania.

== Early life and career ==
Nyalandu pursued higher education in the United States, where he earned an Associate of Arts degree from Waldorf University in Iowa. He later obtained a Bachelor of Arts degree in International Business Administration and Management from Wartburg College, graduating in 1998.

In 2014, he completed a Master of Arts (Research) degree in International Affairs and Diplomacy at the University of Buckingham in the United Kingdom

Nyalandu pursued secondary and primary education in Tanzania. He went to Kibaha Boys' Secondary School and to Ilboru Secondary School. In all these levels he obtained Division One (First Class) in the National Examination. Nyalandu pursued his primary education at Pohama Primary School in his home village in Singida.

Prior to joining party politics, Nyalandu worked as an international affairs and development advisor for the Equal Opportunity Trust Fund, Tanzania from 1999 to 2000. This fund was established and run by Anna Mkapa, the wife of the former president of the United Republic of Tanzania. Before that, Nyalandu served as operations banker at Northwest Bank in Minneapolis from 1998 to 1999.

== Non-political leadership and governance experience ==
In April 2015, Nyalandu was appointed vice chair of the New International Executive Board of Directors of Africa Travel Association (ATA), a New York-based trade association promoting travel and tourism to Africa and strengthening intra-Africa partnerships.

Nyalandu has previously served in a number of organizations' boards including chairing the Finance Committee of the Board of Trustees of Tanzania National Parks Authority (TANAPA) from 2007 to 2010.

Nyalandu was also a student leader, known for his role as the national president of Tanzania Christian Students Fellowship (TCSF), commonly known as UKWATA in Tanzania, from 1991 to 1993.

== Political career ==
Nyalandu was first elected as Member of Parliament for Singida North constituency in November 2000 and was re-elected in 2005 and 2010. He represented the constituency for three consecutive terms.

During his tenure in Parliament, Nyalandu was involved in development initiatives within Singida North, including projects related to access to clean water, improvements to secondary school science laboratories, and community-based development activities involving both Christian and Muslim religious leaders.

In Parliament, he served on several committees, including the Foreign Affairs Committee and the Public Accounts Committee, on which he served for five years each. He also served as chair of the Tanzanian–Turkish Parliamentary Friendship Group and the Tanzania Young Parliamentarians Association.

=== Minister ===
As Minister of Natural Resources and Tourism, Nyalandu participated in national and international efforts to address elephant poaching and illegal wildlife trade. During his tenure, Tanzania held significant ivory stockpiles, and the ministry engaged with international partners on issues related to ivory management and monitoring.

In May 2014, Nyalandu convened a conference in Tanzania that brought together international development partners and governments, including representatives from the United Kingdom, United States, European Union, World Bank, UNDP, Global Environment Facility, African Development Bank, East African Community, and several ivory consumer countries. The meeting followed the February 2014 Illegal Wildlife Trade Conference held in London and focused on implementation of agreed measures to combat wildlife trafficking.

As minister, Nyalandu also represented Tanzania in international tourism and investment forums. In 2014, Tanzania was selected to host the Africa Hotel Investment Forum for the first time, scheduled to take place in 2015.

During his tenure, the Tanzania Wildlife Authority (TAWA) was established as an autonomous government agency responsible for wildlife management in protected areas outside national parks.

In July 2014, the Ministry of Natural Resources and Tourism revoked the hunting licenses and permits of a company accused of violating hunting regulations. While serving as Deputy Minister for Industry and Trade, Nyalandu also announced measures restricting foreign nationals from operating as vendors in local markets in Dar es Salaam.

=== 2015 presidential campaign ===
On 28 December 2014, he announced his intention to run for the presidency in the 2015 election and joined opposition party CHADEMA which he had unsuccessful Presidential bid against Edward Lowassa as party candidate bearer.

== Personal life ==
He is married to Faraja Nyalandu (née Kotta), the winner of Miss Tanzania in 2004. They have two children, Sarah and Christopher. Nyalandu is a Christian.
