= Zainab Amir Gama =

Tanzanian politician

Zainab Amir Gama (born March 30, 1949) is a former Member of Parliament in the National Assembly of Tanzania.
