= Felister Aloyce Bura =

Tanzanian politician

Member of the National Assembly of Tanzania
- Incumbent
- Assumed office 2005

Personal details
- Born: October 9, 1959 (age 66)
- Party: Chama Cha Mapinduzi

Felister Aloyce Bura (born November 9, 1959) is a Member of Parliament in the National Assembly of Tanzania. She is a member of Chama Cha Mapinduzi (Party of the Revolution).
