= William Jonathan Kusila =

Tanzanian politician

William Jonathan Kusila (born 20 April 1948 in Bahi District) is a Tanzanian CCM politician and Member of Parliament for Bahi constituency in the National Assembly of Tanzania since 1995.
