= Othman Masoud Sharif =

Tanzanian lawyer and politician

Othan Masoud Othman Sharif
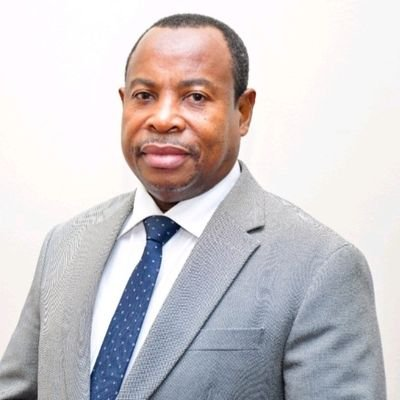

First Vice President of Zanzibar
- Incumbent
- Assumed office 2 March 2021
- President: Hussein Mwinyi
- Preceded by: Seif Sharif Hamad

Personal details
- Born: Pemba
- Party: Alliance for Change and Transparency
- Spouse: Zainab Shaib Kombo
- Children: Imran Othman Masoud, Rauhiyyah Othman Masoud, Asya Othman Masoud, Shaymaa Othman Masoud, Rubina Othman Masoud, Masoud Othman Masoud, Khalil Othman Masoud, Tajmeel Othman Masoud
- Education: UDSM, University of London, University of Turin
- Profession: Lawyer

Othman Masoud Othman Sharif is a Tanzanian lawyer and politician serving as the First Vice President of Zanzibar. He is also a party member of ACT Wazalendo.
