= Teddy Louise Kasella-Bantu =

Tanzanian politician

Teddy Louise Kasella-Bantu was a Member of Parliament in the National Assembly of Tanzania.
