= Samuel Mchele Chitalilo =

Tanzanian politician (born 1965)

Samuel Mchele Chitalilo (born 15 June 1965) is a former Member of Parliament in the National Assembly of Tanzania.
