= Aziza Sleyum Ally =

Tanzanian MP

- Occupation: Member of Parliament

Aziza Sleyum Ally is a Member of Parliament in the National Assembly of Tanzania.
