= Aisha Omar Kigoda =

Tanzanian politician

Aisha Omar Kigoda (born December 26, 1955) is a Member of Parliament in the National Assembly of Tanzania. She has also served as the Deputy Minister for Health and Social Welfare for Tanzania since 2006.

== Biography ==
Kigoda attended AMO Training School in 1985 where she received an Advanced Diploma in Clinical Medicine.

In 2007, Kigoda was the Chair of the Parliamentary Committee on Economic Affairs.
