= Josephine Johnson Genzabuke =

Tanzanian politician

Josephine Johnson Genzabuke born September 9, 1961, is a Member of Parliament in the National Assembly of Tanzania.

== Education ==
She has attained a Certificate from the Mwibuye Teachers Training College. In her young age she attended Muganza Primary School for her basic education.

== Career ==
From 1981 to1993 she was a teacher at under the Ministry of Education. She has attained several roles politically. In 2008 she was the Kigoma Regional Chairperson-UWT. In 2003 she served as the UWT - General Assembly. Between 2010 and 2012 she was member of the Finance and Economic Affairs Committee of the Parliament.
