= Paschal Constantine Degera =

Tanzanian politician

Paschal Constantine Degera (born 29 April 1945) is a former Member of Parliament in the National Assembly of Tanzania.
