= Hemed Suleiman Abdalla =

2nd Vice President of Zanzibar

Hon. Hemed Suleiman Abdulla MP

Second Vice President of Zanzibar
- Incumbent
- Assumed office November 2020
- President: Hussein Mwinyi
- Preceded by: Seif Ali Iddi

Member of Parliament
- Incumbent
- Assumed office 2020
- Appointed by: Hussein Mwinyi
- Constituency: None (Nominated MP)

Personal details
- Born: Hemed Suleiman Abdulla; 5 April 1973 (age 53) Zanzibar, Tanzania
- Party: Chama Cha Mapinduzi
- Education: Fidel Castro Secondary School; Open University of Tanzania; Institute of Finance Management; Mzumbe University; The European University of America

Hemed Suleiman Abdulla (born 5 April 1973 in Kiwani, Pemba) is a Tanzanian CCM politician and 2nd Vice President of Zanzibar from 2020. He was nominated by the President Hussein Mwinyi to become a member of Zanzibar House of Representatives.
