= Haji Mwita Haji =

Tanzanian politician (born 1949)

Haji Mwita Haji (born October 3, 1949) is a former Member of Parliament in the National Assembly (CCM party) of Tanzania.
