= Abubakar Khamis Bakary =

Tanzanian politician (died 2020)

Member of Parliament
- In office ?–?

Minister of Justice and Constitutions Affairs
- In office 2010–?

Personal details
- Died: 11 November 2020 Pemba, Zanzibar
- Party: ACT Wazalendo
- Occupation: Politician

Abubakar Khamis Bakary (died 11 November 2020) was an ACT Wazalendo politician in Tanzania. He was a Member of Parliament in the National Assembly.

In 2010, he became head of the Ministry of Justice and Constitutions Affairs. In 2015, he resigned from CUF and joined ACT Wazalendo in 2019.

== Death ==
On 11 November 2020, Bakary died of poor health in Pemba, Zanzibar.

== Links ==
- Parliament of Tanzania website profile, parliament.go.tz.
