= Abdulsalaam Amer =

Tanzanian politician (born 1963)

Honourable Abdulsalaam Amer MP

Member of Parliament for Mikumi
- In office November 2010 – November 2015
- Preceded by: Clemence Beatus Lyamba
- Succeeded by: Joseph Haule

Personal details
- Born: 11 July 1963 (age 63) Tanganyika
- Party: CCM
- Education: Nguzo Primary School; Forest Hill Secondary School

Abdulsalaam Selemani Amer (born 11 July 1963) is a Tanzanian CCM politician and Member of Parliament for Mikumi constituency from 2010 to 2015.
