= Mahmoud Mgimwa =

Tanzanian politician (born 1963)

Honourable Mahmoud Mgimwa MP

Deputy Minister of Natural Resources and Tourism
- Incumbent
- Assumed office 20 January 2014
- Minister: Lazaro Nyalandu
- Preceded by: Lazaro Nyalandu

Member of Parliament for Mufindi North
- Incumbent
- Assumed office November 2010
- Preceded by: Joseph Mungai

Personal details
- Born: 13 March 1963 (age 63) Tanganyika
- Party: CCM
- Education: IDM, Mzumbe (AdvDip)

Mahmoud Hassan Mgimwa (born 13 March 1963) is a Tanzanian CCM politician and Member of Parliament for Mufindi North constituency since 2010.
