= Salim Abdallah Khalfan =

Tanzanian politician

Salim Abdallah Khalfan (born October 4, 1961) is a former Member of Parliament in the National Assembly of Tanzania.
