= Monica Ngezi Mbega =

Tanzanian politician (born 1956)

Monica Ngezi Mbega (born 22 April 1956) is a Tanzanian CCM politician and Member of Parliament for Iringa Mjini constituency in the National Assembly of Tanzania since 1995.
