= Siraju Juma Kaboyonga =

Tanzanian politician

Siraju Juma Kaboyonga (31 August 1949 – 11 December 2012) was a Member of Parliament in the National Assembly of Tanzania between 2005 and 2010.
