= Raphael Chegeni =

Tanzanian politician

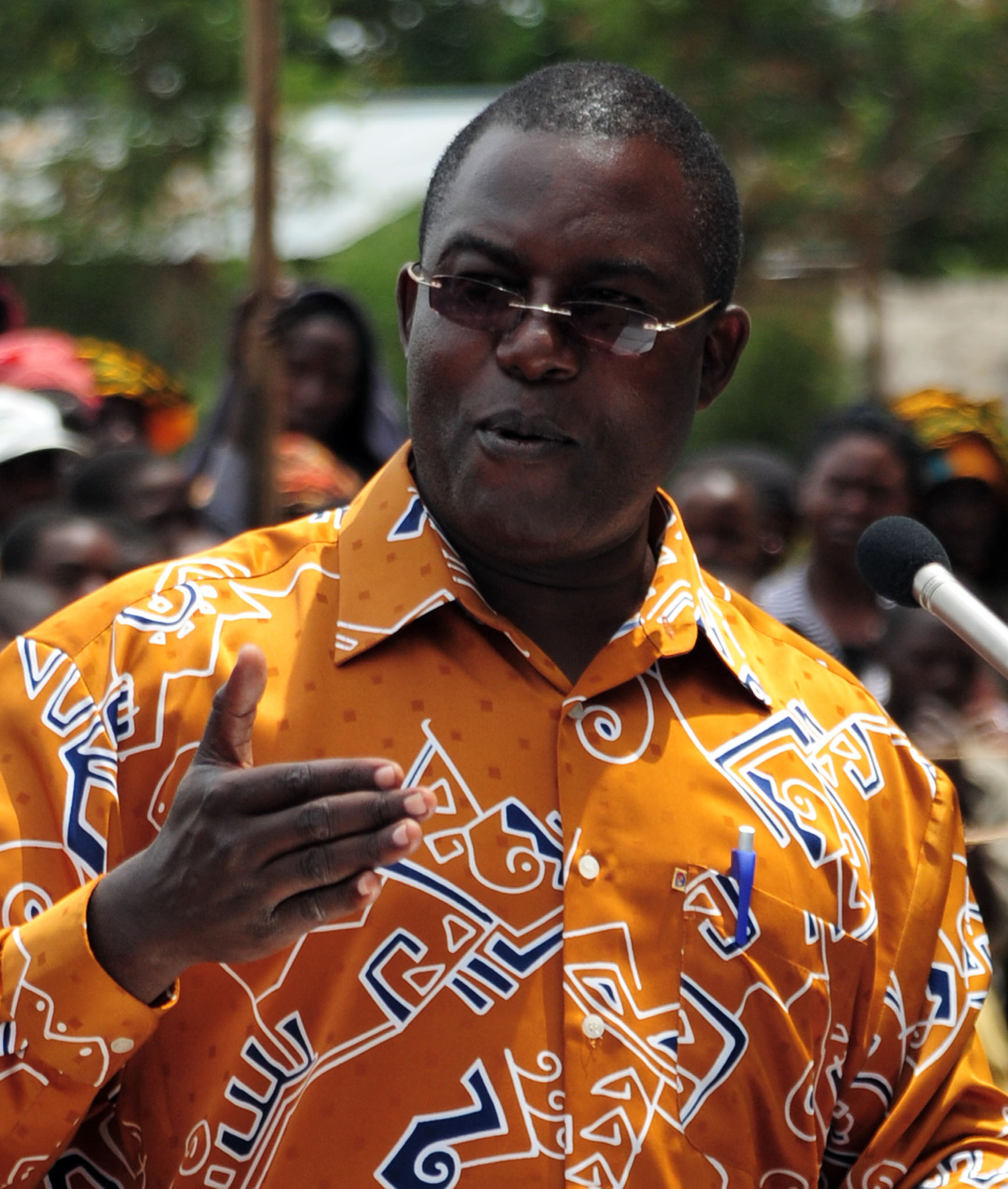

Member of the Tanzanian Parliament
- In office 2000–2010
- Succeeded by: Titus Kamani
- Constituency: Busega

Personal details
- Born: 25 May 1964 (age 62)
- Party: CCM
- Education: University of Strathclyde (MSc), (PhD)

Raphael Msunga Chegeni is a Member of Parliament in the National Assembly of Tanzania.

Chegeni is Regional Chairperson of The Great Lakes Parliamentary Forum on Peace (AMANI Forum), East Africa Chapter Representative on the Parliamentary Network of the World Bank. He was the chairperson of Commonwealth Parliamentary Association, Tanzania Branch from 2006 to 2010. He is a member of Chama Cha Mapinduzi - CCM, the governing party in Tanzania. Dr. Chegeni is a Co-President on the Council of Parliamentary Network for Nuclear Disarmament as part of the Middle Power Initiative. In 2004, he joined the Parliamentarians for Global Action.

== Education and early career ==
Chegeni attended Nyegezi Seminary, where he received his secondary education to A-Level, graduating in 1985. He received his Advanced Diploma in Accounting from the UHDSM/National Board of Accountants & Auditors in 1990, and became a Registered Accountant with the National Board of Accountants and Auditors. He made further postgraduate studies in financial management at Leiden in the Netherlands in 1995, then went on to study for a MSc in Finance and PhD in Business administration at the University of Strathclyde from 1996 to 2003.

Chegeni worked at the Ministry of Finance as an accountant from 1989-1990. He then worked at the Caritas Mwanza as Chief Accountant from 1991-1995, and at the Tanganyika Gold company as Finance Manager from 1997-1998. Prior to his move to a political career, he worked at Ashanti Goldfields Company as Finance & Admin. Manager from 1999-2000.

== Election ==
In 2005 Chegeni was elected for a five-year term.

Candidate	Party	Sex	Votes	%
Dr. Raphael Msunga Chegeni	CCM	M	39,265	72.7
Stanslaus Hatari Matulanya	CUF	M	1,8567	3.6
Happyiness Buyegi Zangi	UDP	F	12,860	23.8

Valid votes: 53,992
Registered voters: 79,736
3,685 spoilt votes
