= Phares Kashemeza Kabuye =

Tanzanian politician

Phares Kashemeza Kabuye was a Member of Parliament in the National Assembly of Tanzania. He died in a car crash in 2009.

== Background ==
He attended Middle school and class 10. He then went attended Teachers College. He quit school in order to get employed and help his siblings following the passing of his parents.

== Career ==
Phares Kabuye served as MP for Biharamulo since 1985 being a member for CCM. He then lost a seat to the other person before he won it back in 1995 through Tanzania Labor Party(TLP). He was the only TLP member of the parliament during the era.

He was also a member of the Pan African Parliament from Tanzania.

== Death ==
He was involved in a car crash (bus in Morogoro) he boarded from Biharamulo to attend his Party meeting in the then Capital Dar Es Salaam.
