= Shoka Khamis Juma =

Tanzanian politician

Current Political Role: Vice-Presidential Candidate for the Alliance for Democratic Change (ADC), running alongside presidential candidate Wilson Mulumbe in the 2025 Tanzanian general election.

Previous Political Role: Member of Parliament in the National Assembly of Tanzania

Topic / Context	Stance / Promise
Constitutional Reform	Pledged to revise the national constitution within three months if elected.
Government Inclusion	Announced plans to form a Government of National Unity (GNU) and appoint opposition members to parliament.
Political Fairness	Criticized the 5% vote threshold for state funding of political parties, calling it discriminatory.
Social Services	Promised to improve medicine supply chains and provide interest-free local government development funds.
Economic Development	Urged voters to bring about change, criticizing incumbent MPs for being out of touch with constituents' struggles.

Shoka Khamis Juma was a Member of Parliament in the National Assembly of Tanzania.

== Sources ==
- Parliament of Tanzania website
