= Elizabeth Nkunda Batenga =

Tanzanian politician

Elizabeth Nkunda Batenga is a Member of Parliament in the National Assembly of Tanzania.
