= Khaled Juma =

Palestinian poet and author

Khaled Juma (خالد جمعة) is a writer from Palestine.

== Biographical information ==
Born in Rafah, on October 25, 1965, Juma was raised in Al-Shaboura Palestinian Refugee Camp, in the Gaza Strip. He is Head of the Cultural Department in Palestine News and Information Agency (WAFA), and was previously Editor-in-Chief of Roya Magazine for seven years. He has a portfolio of over 29 publications in a variety of genres; poetry, prose poetry, short stories, children's stories, TV sketches, plays and over 100 songs.

== Works ==
Juma has published nine poetry collections. His children's books include The Little Olive Tree, The Magic Carpet, The Sun's Journey, The Colors of Palestine, My Grandfather's Stories, Diaries of a Germ, an educational title about hygiene, and Black Ear, Blonde Ear which teaches tolerance and acceptance of others. "Three Legs" won second place in the Diwan Al-Arab Competition in 2006. Juma has written and adapted a number of theatrical plays. Gaza, Your Sea is a dance musical.

He has also written over 100 songs in both classic Arabic and the Palestinian dialect. His songs have been performed by Palestinian musicians such as Said Murad, Moneim Adwan, Odeh Turjman, Mahmoud Al-Abbadi, Reem Talhami, and Mohammad Assaf. He wrote the opening song for the Palestinian television series Amm Jbara. His works have been translated into English, French, Spanish, German, Bulgarian, Norwegian and Dutch. Juma founded a folklore dance group in Gaza, and hosts creative writing workshops for children and adults.

== Bibliography ==
=== Poetry ===
1. Nothing Walks in this Dream, Al-Ahliya for Publishing, Jordan, 2015

2. So the Gypsie Wouldn't Love You, Fikr for Research and Publishing, Beirut, 2012

3. As Horses Alter, Fadaat for Publishing, Jordan,1st Ed. 2011, 2nd Ed. 2013

4. Such Is the Habit of Cities, Gaza 2009

5. You Still Resemble Yourself, Gaza 2004

6. Therefore, Sharqiat Publishing, Cairo, 2000

7. Irrelevant Texts, Palestinian MoC, 1999

8. Thus, The Khalife Begins, Palestinian Writers Union, 1996

9. Rafah; Distance and Memory, with Othman Hussein 1992

=== Children's stories ===
1. Mariam the Dumb, Al-Ahliya for Publishing, Jordan, 2016.

2. Diaries of an Elementary School Boy, Tamer Institute for Social Education, Ramallah, 2015

3. The Rabbit Who Didn't Like His Name, A. M. Qattan Foundation, Gaza, 2012

4. Three Legs, Qattan Foundation, Gaza, 2012

5. Naseh Wa Simsim, 5 Children's Stories in German, Afroasian Institute, Arab Women's League, Vienna, Austria 2010

6. The Magic Iron, Tamer Institute for Social Education, 1st Ed. Ramallah 2009, 2nd Ed. Gaza 2010

7. Zamzouma Leaves the House, Against Hunger Project, Gaza, 2007

8. Kaiouse at a Press Conference, Tamer Institute, GTZ, Gaza 2007

9. The Distant City, Tamer Institute, GTZ, Gaza 2007

10. Sheep Don't Eat Cats, Tamer Institute, UNESCO, 2006 (was listed on IPPY's honor list as one of the world's best 59 children's stories 2008-2010)

11. Balck Ear, Blone Ear, Tamer Institute (in Arabic and English), Ramallah 2002

12. The Story of Two Cubs, (in Arabic and English), UNRWA, Ramallah, 2001

13. Tears of The Yellow Colour, (in Arabic and English), Ramallah, 2001

14. The Context, (in Arabic and English), UNRWA, Ramallah, 2001

15. The Party, Save the Children, Gaza, 2000

16. Tales of the Forest, Kalilah Wa Dimnah For Children, Tamer Institute, Ramallah, 2000

17. Alphabet Village, Series of 5 Stories, UNDP, 2000 (The Flower Story of this series was made into an animation produced by Al-Quds Educational TV)

18. The Sad Pipe, Save the Children, 1999

19. Excerpts of a Germ's Diary, Dutch Project, Gaza Municipality, Gaza 1992

=== Songs Lyrics and Musicals ===
1. I Love the World Album, Odeh Turjman, May 2013

2. The Night Carries Me, Reem Talhami, Said Murad, April 2013

3. The Turned Off Sun, Mahmoud Al-Abbadi (Musical for Children), 2004

4. Six songs in Just a Bit Album, Suheil Khouri, 2003

5. The Pigeon, The Fox and The Heron, Muneim Odwan, Aix en Provence

=== Theater Plays and other Adaptations ===
1. Play Away, Directed by Ibrahim Muzayyan, 2005

2. Shaifinkoush, Directed by Ibrahim Muzayyan, 2006

3. Shater Mush Hassan, Directed by Jamal Abul Qumsan, 2003

4. Out of the Picture, Directed by Philippe Dumola, 2002

5. Gaza, Your Sea, Dance-Musical, Opening of The First Sea Festival 1995
