= Yussuf Khamis =

Tanzanian politician

Honourable Yussuf Khamis MP

Member of Parliament for Nungwi
- Incumbent
- Assumed office November 2010
- Preceded by: Ame Pandu Ame

Personal details
- Born: 13 August 1964 (age 61) Zanzibar
- Party: ACT Wazalendo

Yussuf Khamis (born 13 August 1964) is a Tanzanian ACT Wazalendo politician and Member of Parliament for Nungwi constituency since 2010.
