= Patience Nkunda Kinshaba =

Ugandan politician

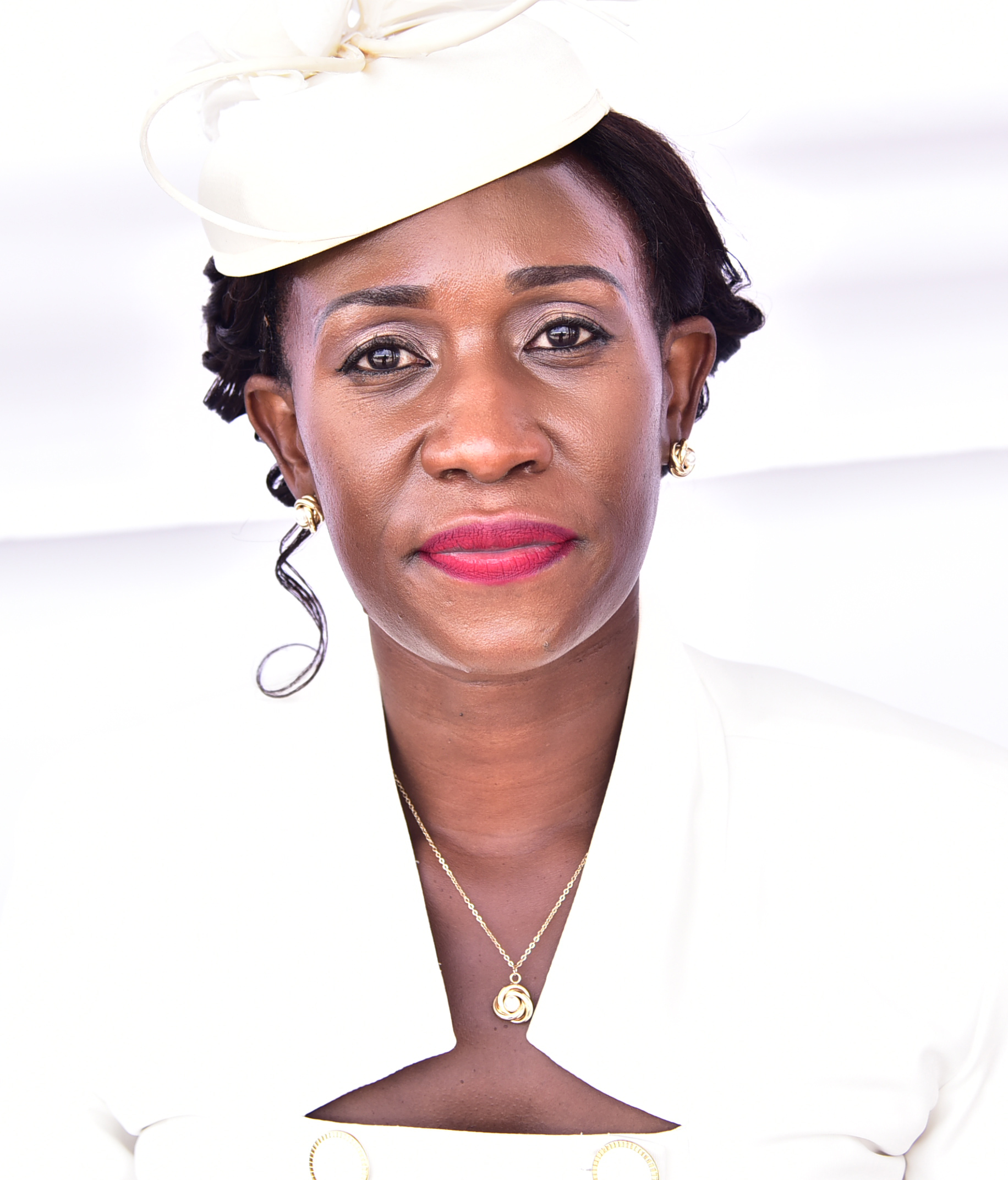

Woman Member of Parliament
- In office 2021–2026
- Constituency: Kanungu District

Personal details
- Born: Kanungu District, Uganda
- Party: National Resistance Movement (NRM)
- Occupation: Politician
- Known for: Advocacy for free drugs for NCDs, health equipment for Kanungu, support for diabetes and hypertension patients
- Committees: Committee on Foreign Affairs

Patience Nkunda Kinshaba also written as Patience Kinshaba Nkunda is a Ugandan politician, legislator and woman representative member of Parliament for Kanungu District in the eleventh Parliament of Uganda. She is affiliated to the National Resistance Movement (NRM)

In the eleventh parliament, Kinshaba serves on the Committee on Foreign Affairs.

== Political career ==
Kinshaba won the NRM primaries after defeating Elizabeth Karungi and she became the National Resistance Movement (NRM) flag in the 2021 National elections. . She won the woman representative member of Parliament for Kanungu District.

Kinshaba presented a motion in the Parliament of Uganda sitting session of wanting the government of Uganda to provide free drugs for Ugandans suffering from diabetes and high blood pressure. But the Ugandan legislators got concerned about the high cost of drugs to treat such Non-Communicable diseases and they demanded that government should provide such drugs for free because of the low stock in public health centres. Kinshaba's motion was seconded by the Tororo Municipality Member of Parliament Apollo Yeri who demanded that the Government would take over through the National Medical Stores (NMS) to procure those drugs free of charge.

Kinshaba demanded the Ugandan government to provide free screening and treatment for retinopathy (which causes blindness), free blood lipid control (to regulate cholesterol levels) and also provide screening for early signs of diabetes-related kidney disease and treatment.

Kinshaba appealed to Ugandan government to procure for the people of Kanungu District more health equipments for their health centre IV operated on one generator that was also unreliable

Kinshaba attended an event for commissioning of the Ambulance that was donated to Bwindi Community Hospital in Kanungu District by Japan through the Japanese Grant Assistance for Grassroots Projects.

== See Also ==
- Anita Among
- Thomas Tayebwa
- Janet Museveni
