= Vuai Abdallah Khamis =

Tanzanian politician (born 1960)

Vuai Abdallah Khamis (born May 17, 1960) is a former Member of Parliament in the National Assembly of Tanzania.
