= Alliance for Change and Transparency =

Political party in Tanzania

Alliance for Change and Transparency Chama cha Wazalendo
- Abbreviation: ACT
- Leader: Zitto Kabwe
- Chairperson: Juma Duni Haji
- Secretary-General: Ado Shaib
- Spokesperson: Salim Biman
- Vice chairperson: Dorothy Semu
- Registered: 5 May 2014
- Headquarters: Dar es Salaam
- Youth wing: Ngome Ya Vijana
- Women's wing: Ngome Ya Wanawake
- Ideology: Democratic socialism Social democracy Faction: Ujamaa
- Political position: Left-wing
- Regional affiliation: Africa Liberal Network
- International affiliation: Progressive International
- Slogan: Taifa kwanza!
- Bunge: 2 / 393
- Zanzibar HoR: 4 / 81

Election symbol
- Open palm

Website
- Party website

The Alliance for Change and Transparency (Swahili: Chama cha Wazalendo, lit. 'Party of Patriots'), sometimes known as the ACT–Wazalendo, is a left-wing political party in Tanzania. It is the third-largest party in the National Assembly of Tanzania. It received its permanent registration in May 2014.

== Background ==
The party was founded in 2014. The party fielded its first presidential candidate in the 2015 general election with Anna Mghwira and won one seat in the national assembly. Prominent members of the party are MP Zitto Kabwe, Seif Sharif Hamad, Othman Masoud Sharif, Bernard Membe, Juma Duni Haji, Ismail Jussa, Selemani Bungara, Zahra Ali Hamad, Subeti Khamis Faki, Saleh Nassor Juma, Omar Ali Shehe, Haji Mwadini Makame, Asha Abdu Haji, Nassor Mazrui, Juma Kombo Hamad, Masoud Salim, Ally Saleh, Ali Salim Khamis, Hamadi Maalim, Khalifa Mohammed Issa, Mohamed Juma Khatib, Twahir Awesu Mohammed, Khatib Haji, Haji Kai, Othman Omar Haji, Nassor Omar, Yussuf Salimu Hussein, Abdalla Ali, Yussuf Khamis, Mgeni Jadi Kadika and Abubakar Khamis Bakary. Zitto who formally joined the party in March 2015 following his expulsion from Chadema.

The party got a second boost in March 2019 when Seif Sharif Hamad defected from his party Civic United Front with other members and joined ACT due to a court ruling against control of his previous party. Currently the party is the leading opposition party in the Zanzibar House of Representatives parliament holding political grounds together with Chama Cha Mapinduzi in a government coalition in Tanzania semi-autonomous Islands of Zanzibar archipelago.

== Election history ==
=== Presidential elections ===
| Election | Party candidate | Votes | % | Result |
|---|---|---|---|---|
| 2015 | Anna Mghwira | 98,763 | 0.65% | Lost ✗ |
| 2020 | Bernard Membe | 81,129 | 0.55% | Lost ✗ |

=== Bunge elections ===
| Election | Votes | % | Seats | +/− | Position | Result |
|---|---|---|---|---|---|---|
| 2015 | 323,112 | 2.22% | 1 / 393 | ▲1 | ▲4th | Opposition |
| 2020 | 81,129 | 0.55% | 5 / 393 | ▲4 | ▲3rd | Opposition |
| 2025 | N/A | N/A | 2 / 393 | ▼2 | ▲2nd | Opposition |
