= Khamis Kagasheki =

Tanzanian politician

Hon. Ambassador Khamis Kagasheki MP
- In office 7 May 2012 – 20 December 2013
- Preceded by: Ezekiel Maige
- Succeeded by: Lazaro Nyalandu
- In office 13 February 2008 – 7 May 2012
- Minister: Lawrence Masha

Member of Parliament for Bukoba Town
- Incumbent
- Assumed office December 2005
- Preceded by: Wilfred Lwakatare

Personal details
- Born: 30 August 1951 (age 75) Tanganyika
- Party: CCM
- Education: Fordham University (BA)
- Twitter handle: @kkagasheki

Khamis Juma Suedi Kagasheki (born 30 August 1951) is a Tanzanian CCM politician and Member of Parliament for Bukoba Town constituency since 2005. He was the Minister of Natural Resources and Tourism.

Mr. Khamis J. Suedi, a career diplomat worked at the Tanzanian Permanent Mission to the United Nations in New York (1977-1982). Headed the Economic Section in the Department of Legal and International Organizations in the Ministry of Foreign Affairs, Dar es Salaam, Tanzania from 1982-1987. Also worked at the Tanzanian Permanent Mission to the United Nations Office in Geneva (1987-1990).

Mr. Suedi joined the World Intellectual Property Organization (WIPO) in January 1990 and in October of the same year, he became Director for Relations with International Organizations and Promotion of Innovations in Developing Countries. In 1995, he became Director, Industrial Property Human Resources Development and Inter-Agency Affairs Department. In 1997, he became Director for the Office of Strategic Planning and Policy Development. He served as an Assistant Director General of WIPO from 2003 to 2006.
