= Rajab Ahmad Juma =

Tanzanian politician

Rajab Ahmad Juma is a former Member of Parliament in the National Assembly of Tanzania.

== Sources ==
- Who returned? Performance in the Bunge and MP re-election
