= Salim Khamis =

Tanzanian politician (1951-2013)

Honourable Salim Khamis MP

Member of Parliament for Chambani
- In office November 2010 – 28 March 2013
- Preceded by: Karim Othman
- Succeeded by: Yussuf Salim Hussein

Personal details
- Born: 20 September 1951 Sultanate of Zanzibar
- Died: 28 March 2013 (aged 61) Dar es Salaam
- Resting place: Chambani, Pemba Island
- Party: CUF
- Education: Commonwealth Mycological Institute

Salim Hemed Khamis (20 September 1951 – 28 March 2013), was a Tanzanian CUF politician and Member of Parliament for Chambani constituency since 2010.
