= Nuru Energy =

- Founded: 2008
- Type: Social enterprise
- Purpose: Bottom of the pyramid
- Location: Kigali, Rwanda
- Region served: Africa; India
- Product: LED lamps and recharge systems
- Website: Homepage

Nuru Energy is an international social enterprise which is working to address the global problem of energy poverty and climate change in Africa and India. This is through the distribution of affordable LED lamps that are recharged using a simple to use human powered generator that is more efficient than current solar.

Nuru Energy's business model uses a unique distribution strategy to sell its products indirectly to rural customers through micro-franchise entrepreneurs who are equipped and trained by the company and financed through Kiva.

== Focus ==
Nuru Energy aims to eradicate the use kerosene lamp from Africa through provision of LED lamps to the bottom of the pyramid markets that cannot afford other alternative solar lighting source due to their high cost. This switch from kerosene use would lead to reduction in global carbon emissions leading to the firm earning carbon credits.

This Clean Development Mechanism project led to the firm partnering with Bank of America Merrill Lynch in 2011, in a deal that would see the investment bank purchase carbon credits from Nuru Energy for a period of 10 years.

== See also ==
- Renewable energy in developing countries
- UN-Energy
- Acumen Fund
- Bank of America Merrill Lynch
- Kiva
