= Parmukh Singh Hoogan =

Tanzanian politician (born 1955)

Honourable Parmukh Singh Hoogan MP

Member of Parliament for Kikwajuni
- In office 2000–2010

Personal details
- Born: 7 December 1955 Zanzibar
- Died: 27 June 2026 (aged 70) Dodoma, Tanzania
- Party: CCM
- Education: Tumekuja Primary School Shangani Secondary School  Central High School - Malawi

Parmukh Singh Hoogan (7 December 1955 – 27 June 2026) was a Tanzanian politician and businessman who served as the member of parliament for the Kikwajuni constituency in the Tanzanian Parliament from 2000 to 2010.
