= Bakari Shamis Faki =

Tanzanian politician

Bakari Shamis Faki is a former Member of Parliament in the National Assembly of Tanzania.
