= Nuru Awadhi Bafadhili =

Tanzanian politician (born 1952)

Nuru Awadhi Bafadhili (born November 22, 1952) is a Member of Parliament in the National Assembly of Tanzania.
