= James Msekela =

Tanzanian politician and diplomat

Dr James Msekela
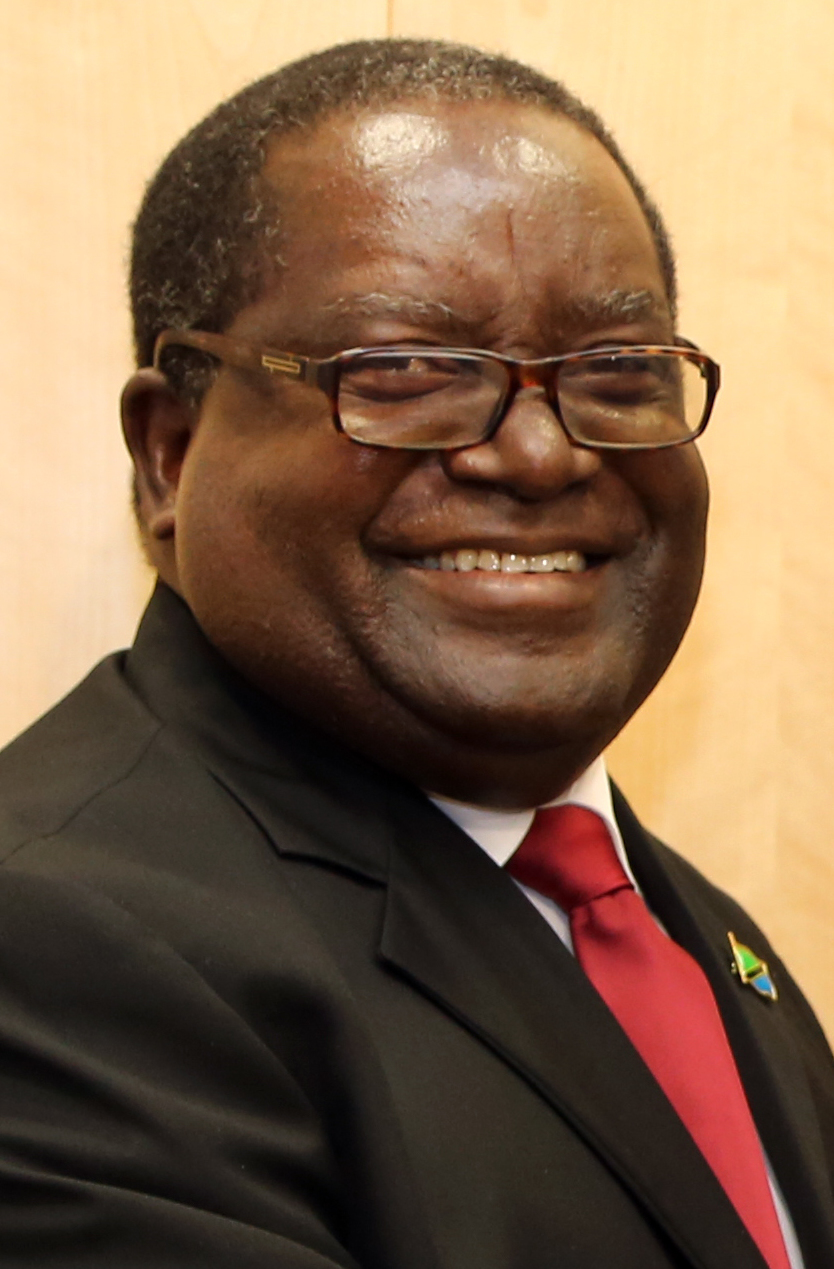
- James Msekela in 2017

Tanzanian Ambassador to Italy
- In office 5 January 2012 – 2015
- Appointed by: Jakaya Kikwete
- Preceded by: Ali Karume
- Succeeded by: George Madafa

Member of Parliament for Tabora North
- In office 2000–2010
- Succeeded by: Shaffin Sumar

Personal details
- Born: 3 September 1959 (age 67) Tanganyika
- Party: CCM
- Education: Dar Technical College (Dip); St. Petersburg State Technical University (MSc); University of Dar es Salaam (PhD); Royal Institute of Technology (Tekn. Lic)

James Alex Msekela (born 3 September 1959) is a Tanzanian politician and diplomat.

He was Tanzania's ambassador to Italy, having been appointed by President Jakaya Mrisho Kikwete and sworn in on 5 January 2012.

== Early life and education ==
In his early life Msekela grew up in Tabora District and later on in Nzega District, Ijanija ward, where he finished his primary education in 1973 at the Tazengwa Primary School. From 1974 he attended Tanga Technical Secondary School, graduating in 1977, and went on to Dar es Salaam Technical College where he received his Full Technician Certificate in 1981. He joined the CCM as a youth member in 1980, and a full member in 1982. After graduation he briefly worked with The Tanzania Cashewnut Authority before he went to Mafinga to do his compulsory one-year National Service. In mid 1982 he got employed at the University of Dar es Salaam as a technician.

In mid 1983 he received a scholarship to Leningrad State Technical University in the U.S.S.R. where in 1990 he received his Master's of science in Engineering. Upon his return from Russia, he was hired as a lecturer at the University of Dar es Salaam. Three years later he was admitted to the Electrical Machines Department of the Royal Institute of Technology in Stockholm, Sweden where he received his Licentiate Teknik degree in 1995. This was concurrent with his work on his doctorate at the University of Dar es Salaam, where he received his Ph.D. in Engineering in 1997. He continued teaching at the Faculty of Engineering of the University of Dar es Salaam until October 2000 when he got elected Member of Parliament, representing Tabora Constituency under the CCM ticket, the position he retained for five more years after the National Election of year 2005.

== Politics ==
A long time CCM party member, Msekela entered politics in 2000 when he got elected Member of Parliament for Tabora North Constituency, alongside taking duties for the party. He was re-elected to the Tanzanian Parliament in 2005 from the Tabora North Tabora (Tabora Kaskazini) of Tabora Urban District. In 2006, in addition to his MP duties, he was appointed by the President of the United Republic of Tanzania as Regional Commissioner for Mwanza Region. which job he held until February 2009 when he was appointed Regional Commissioner for the Dodoma Region where he served until October 2011. Msekela did not run again for parliament in the 2010 elections. From Dodoma he went on to become the Ambassador to Italy for four years starting from early 2012.
