= Asha Mshimba Jecha =

Tanzanian politician

Asha Mshimba Jecha (born June 26, 1962) is a Member of Parliament in the National Assembly of Tanzania. She has served in parliament since 2005. Jecha is a member of the Chama Cha Mapinduzi political party.
