= Juma Luzio =

Tanzanian footballer

Personal information
- Full name: Juma Luzio
- Date of birth: 24 November 1997 (age 28)
- Place of birth: Morogoro, Tanzania
- Height: 1.78 m (5 ft 10 in)
- Position: Forward

Team information
- Current team: Mtibwa Sugar

Senior career*
Years	Team	Apps	(Gls)
2012–2014	Mtibwa Sugar		
2014–2016	ZESCO United		
2016–2018	Simba		
2018–2020	Mtibwa Sugar		

International career^{‡}
2013–	Tanzania	8	(1)
- * Club domestic league appearances and goals as of 22:47, 9 June 2020 (UTC) ‡ National team caps and goals as of 22:47, 9 June 2020 (UTC)

Juma Luzio (born 24 November 1997) is a Tanzanian football striker who plays for Mtibwa Sugar F.C.
