= Mwadini Abbas Jecha =

Tanzanian politician

Mwadini Abbas Jecha is a former Member of Parliament in the National Assembly of Tanzania.
