= Cyril Chami =

Tanzanian politician

Honourable Dr Cyril Chami MP

14th Minister of Industry and Trade
- In office 28 November 2010 – May 2012
- Preceded by: Mary Nagu
- Succeeded by: Abdallah Kigoda

Member of Parliament for Moshi Rural
- In office December 2005 – October 2015
- Preceded by: Thomas Ngawaiya
- Succeeded by: Anthony Komu

Personal details
- Born: 9 February 1964 Tanganyika
- Died: 5 November 2020 (aged 56) Dodoma
- Party: CCM
- Education: University of Dar es Salaam; University of Alberta (PhD)

Cyril August Chami (9 February 1964 – 5 November 2020) was a Tanzanian CCM politician and Member of Parliament for the Moshi Rural constituency from 2005 to 2015.

Chami was a Member of Parliament in the National Assembly of Tanzania, having won the seat of Moshi Rural as a Chama Cha Mapinduzi (CCM) candidate in the 2005 parliamentary election after the seat had been held by the opposition for ten years. Following this victory, he was appointed Deputy Minister for Foreign Affairs and International Cooperation on January 4, 2006. He was subsequently moved to the position of Deputy Minister for Trade Industries and Marketing on February 12, 2008. He also served as the Minister of Industry, Trade and Marketing from 2010 to 2012.
