= Mwajuma Hassan Khamis =

Tanzanian politician

Mwajuma Hassan Khamis was a Member of Parliament in the National Assembly of Tanzania.

== See also ==
- Politics of Tanzania
