= Lisa Daftari =

American investigative journalist

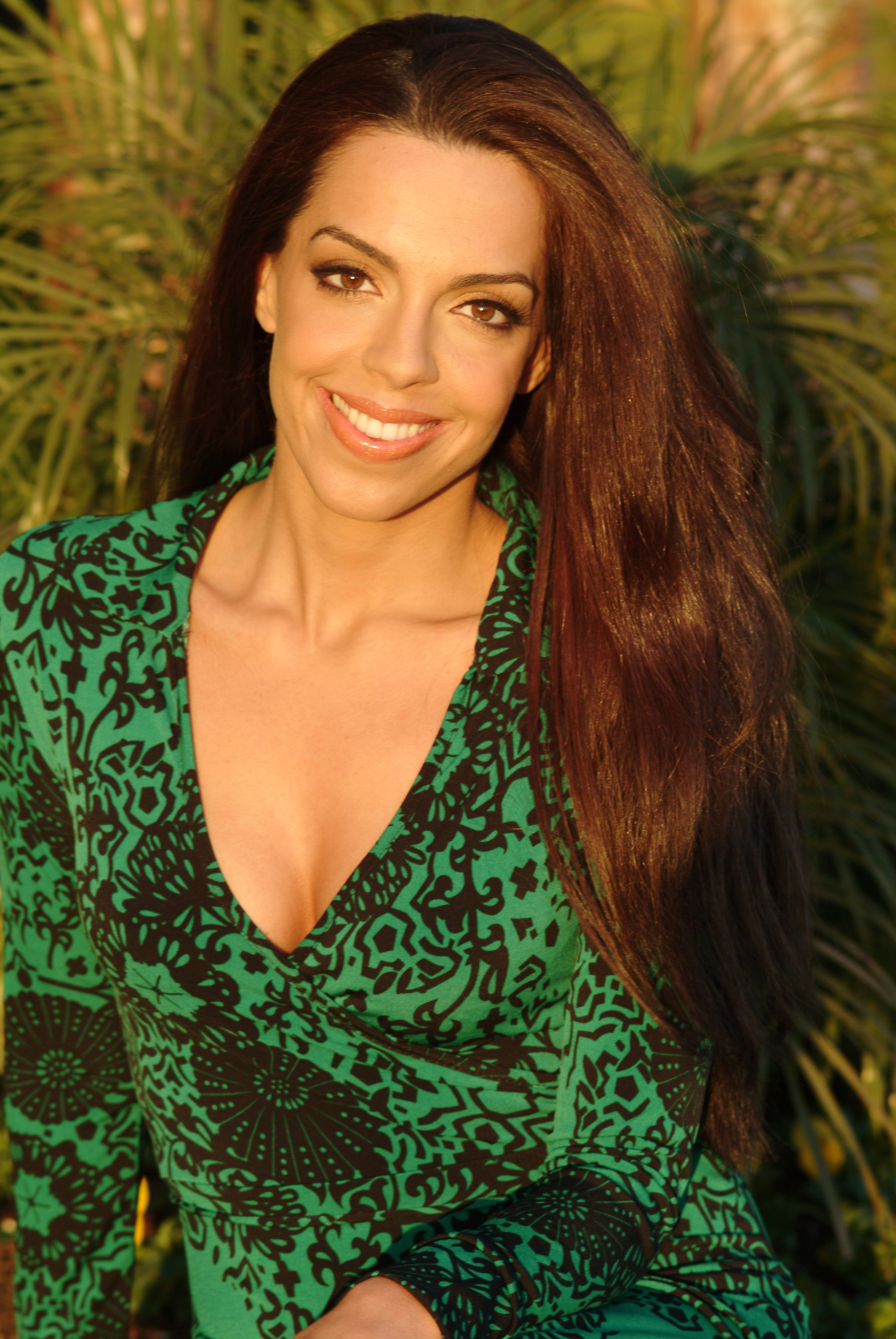
- Education: Rutgers University–New Brunswick (B.A.); University of Southern California (MA)
- Occupation: Journalist
- Employer: Fox News Channel
- Website: https://www.lisadaftari.com

Lisa Daftari is an American journalist. She works as an investigative journalist focusing on foreign affairs, with a specialization in Middle Eastern policy and counterterrorism. She regularly appears on television and radio with commentary and analysis, providing exclusive reporting on vital developments in the region. Currently, she is an on-air Fox News political analyst and has previously been featured on CBS, NBC, PBS, The Washington Post, NPR, ABC, Voice of America, and others. Daftari also serves as founder and editor-in-chief of The Foreign Desk, an international news and U.S. foreign policy news website. Daftari has been interviewed in Spanish, English, and Persian.

Her areas of expertise and coverage include the Middle East and North Africa, terrorism, national security, the Arab Spring, global Christian persecution, human rights, cyber security, and more. She was invited to show her documentary film about an Iranian underground political movement in Congress. She frequently is called upon to give briefs and expert testimony for government and private entities. Daftari has worked for a number of think tanks in Washington, where she has written exclusive reports for the Pentagon and other government groups.

== Early life ==
Daftari was born in New Jersey to Sean and Simin Daftari. Her father is a physician and medical scholar, and her mother has a background in language and accounting. Her parents are of Iranian Jewish ancestry who met in United States and married in Iran. She grew up in Bergen County, and is the second of the four Daftari children.

Daftari attended Frisch High School, a highly rated private school in New Jersey. She graduated from Rutgers University New Brunswick with a B.A. in Spanish, Middle Eastern studies, and vocal performance. She went on to receive her master's degree in broadcast journalism at the Annenberg School of Journalism at the University of Southern California, where she was awarded a Presidential Merit Scholarship. Using her grant, she delivered the exclusive story of four Iranian brothers detained in federal prison on charges connecting them to the MEK, a political organization opposed to the Iranian government. She delivered her report on PBS for a 9/11 anniversary show.

Daftari is fluent in English, Persian, Hebrew, and Spanish, and is an avid opera singer and pianist.

== Career ==
In 2006, while in graduate school, Daftari was invited to show her thesis documentary film about an underground Iranian political group, Marze Por Gohar, to Congress. During that time, she worked as an associate producer in the investigative unit at NBC in Los Angeles. While at NBC, she helped break the story about the 2005 Los Angeles bomb plot, in which Jamiyyat Ul-Islam Is-Saheeh, an Islamist prison gang, planned to bomb prominent Los Angeles sites.

In 2007, after graduating, Daftari left NBC to work as a researcher for several think tanks focusing on the Middle East and counterterrorism. She attended several hearings on Iran divestment in the California State Assembly. At the end of that year, she delivered a 100-page report about Iranian youth movements to the Pentagon.

In 2009, Daftari began appearing on the Fox News Channel commenting on developments in the Middle East and Iran, in particular. She appears frequently on the network on various television and radio programs.

In 2015, she launched "The Foreign Desk," a website dedicated to reporting stories from around the world with an emphasis on their impact on human rights, global security, and U.S. foreign policy.
