= Maua Abeid Daftari =

Tanzanian politician

Hon. Dr. Maua Abeid Daftari

Deputy Minister of Science, Technology and ICT Development
- In office 2008–2010
- President: Jakaya Kikwete

Deputy Minister of Infrastructure Development
- In office 2006–2008
- President: Jakaya Kikwete

Deputy Minister of Communication and Transport
- In office 2000–2005
- President: Benjamin Mkapa

Member of the Tanzanian Parliament
- In office 1990 – 2015
- Constituency: Special Seat

Personal details
- Born: 16 April 1953 (age 73) Tanganyika
- Party: CCM
- Education: Nanking Medical University (Medical Degree); Eastern and Southern African Management Institute; Washington International University (MD)
- Occupation: Politician
- Profession: Doctor

Maua Abeid Daftari was a Member of Parliament in the National Assembly of Tanzania.

== Sources ==
- Parliament of Tanzania website
- CV
