= Mgeni Jadi Kadika =

Tanzanian politician

Mgeni Jadi Kadika (born 1957) is a Tanzanian member of parliament for the Civic United Front.

== Life ==
Mgeni Kadika received her schooling in Pandani, Pemba North, leaving secondary school in 1976. From 1977 to 1980 she worked for Zanzibar Ministry of Trade, and from 1980 to 1988 was a manager at a cooperative shop.

She entered the National Assembly in 2005 as a Special Seats MP under Civic United Front party, and held her seat in the 2010 and 2015 elections.

In May 2016, Kadika asked if the government was going to provide public education and research on uterine fibroid disease. In April 2020 she expressed concern at the growing incidence of kidney disease in Tanzania, and asked the Health Minister, Ummy Mwalimu, to release regional statistics. In May 2020, she asked the Health Minister, Ummy Mwalimu, what actions the Tanzanian government was taking, beyond border screening, to protect Tanzanian citizens from COVID-19.

Mgeni Kadika was one of 21 MPs who defected from the CUF to join ACT-Wazalendo in June 2020.
