= Philip Marmo =

Tanzanian politician and diplomat

Tanzanian Ambassador to Germany
- Incumbent
- Assumed office 2013
- Appointed by: Jakaya Kikwete
- Preceded by: Ahmada Ngemera

Tanzanian Ambassador to China
- In office April 2012 – 2013
- Succeeded by: Abdulrahman Shimbo

Member of Parliament for Mbulu
- In office 1985–2010
- Succeeded by: Mustapha Akunaay

Personal details
- Born: 29 December 1951 (age 74) Tanganyika
- Party: CCM
- Children: 5
- Education: University of Dar es Salaam; Bangladesh Institute of Law

Philip Sang'ka Marmo (29 December 1951) is a Tanzanian politician and diplomat.
