= Abdullah Mwinyi =

Tanzanian politician (born 1974)

East African Legislative Assembly MP
- In office 2007–2017
- Constituency: Tanzania

Personal details
- Born: 10 October 1974 (age 52) Unguja, Zanzibar
- Party: Chama Cha Mapinduzi
- Spouse: Fatma Dahir (m. 18 January 2018)
- Relations: Hussein Mwinyi (brother)
- Children: 3
- Parents: Ali Hassan Mwinyi (father); Siti Mwinyi (mother)
- Education: University of Wales
- Website: www.abdullahmwinyi.com

Abdullah Ali Hassan Mwinyi is Tanzanian CCM politician, an Advocate of the High Court of Tanzania and High Court of Zanzibar.

He was a former member of the East African Legislative Assembly (EALA) from 2007 to 2017 where he served as Chairman of Legal, Privileges and Rules Committee and Regional Affairs and Conflict Resolution Committee.

== Early life and education ==
Mwinyi has a bachelor of laws (LLB) and a master's degree in Commercial Law (LLM - Commercial Law), both from the University of Wales, Cardiff. He completed his education in 2000.

== Political career ==
In 2007, Mwinyi was elected to represent Tanzania in the East African Legislative Assembly (EALA) during the second assembly (2007 - 2012), he was re-elected and continued to represent Tanzania constituency on the third assembly (2012 - 2017). During his tenure at EALA he chaired the Legal, Privileges and Rules Committee and Regional Affairs and Conflict Resolution Committee where he played a key role in resolving Burundi crisis in 2016 as part of the responsibilities of EALA to member states.

== Professional career ==
Founder of Asyla Attorneys, Mwinyi presently is managing director at Envision Consulting Ltd. He is also on the board of Swala Oil & Gas (Tanzania) Ltd. and Swala (PAEM) Ltd. In his past career he held the position of Associate at Mkono & Co. and Secretary of BP Tanzania Ltd.

== Personal life ==
He is the son of Ali Hassan Mwinyi, the second President of Tanzania.
