= Riziki Omar Juma =

Tanzanian politician

Riziki Omar Juma is a Member of Parliament in the National Assembly of Tanzania.
