= Abdalla Ali =

Tanzanian politician

Honourable Abdalla Ali MP

Member of Parliament for Kiwani
- In office November 2010 – 2020
- Preceded by: Omar Ali Mzee

Personal details
- Born: 1 January 1964 (age 62) Sultanate of Zanzibar
- Party: ACT Wazalendo

Abdalla Haji Ali (born 1 January 1964) is a Tanzanian ACT Wazalendo politician and Member of Parliament for Kiwani constituency since 2010 to 2020.
