= Ismail Jussa =

Zanzibari politician

Member of the Zanzibar House of Representatives
- Incumbent
- Assumed office November 2010

Personal details
- Born: 18 August 1971 (age 55) Unguja, Zanzibar
- Party: Alliance for Change and Transparency
- Education: University of Hull (LL.B)

Ismail Jussa Ladhu (born 18 August 1971) is a Zanzibari ACT Wazalendo politician serving the Stonetown constituency in the Zanzibar House of Representatives. He also served as a member of the Tanzanian Parliament in 2010 after being nominated by President Jakaya Kikwete.
