= Athumani S. Janguo =

Tanzanian politician

Athuman Saidi Minshehe Janguo

Member of the National Assembly of Tanzania
- Constituency: Kisarawe

Member of the Pan-African Parliament

Director General of Tanzania Harbour Authority

Personal details
- Born: 5 December 1936 (age 89)

Athuman Saidi Minshehe Janguo (born December 5, 1936) is a Tanzanian politician. He is a former member of both the National Assembly of Tanzania and the African Union's Pan-African Parliament. As a Tanzanian member of parliament, his constituency was Kisarawe and he was a member of the Parliamentary Privileges, Ethics and Powers Committee. Janguo is a former Director General of the Tanzania Harbour Authority (TPA).
