= Seif Ali Iddi =

Tanzanian politician

Hon. Seif Ali Iddi MP
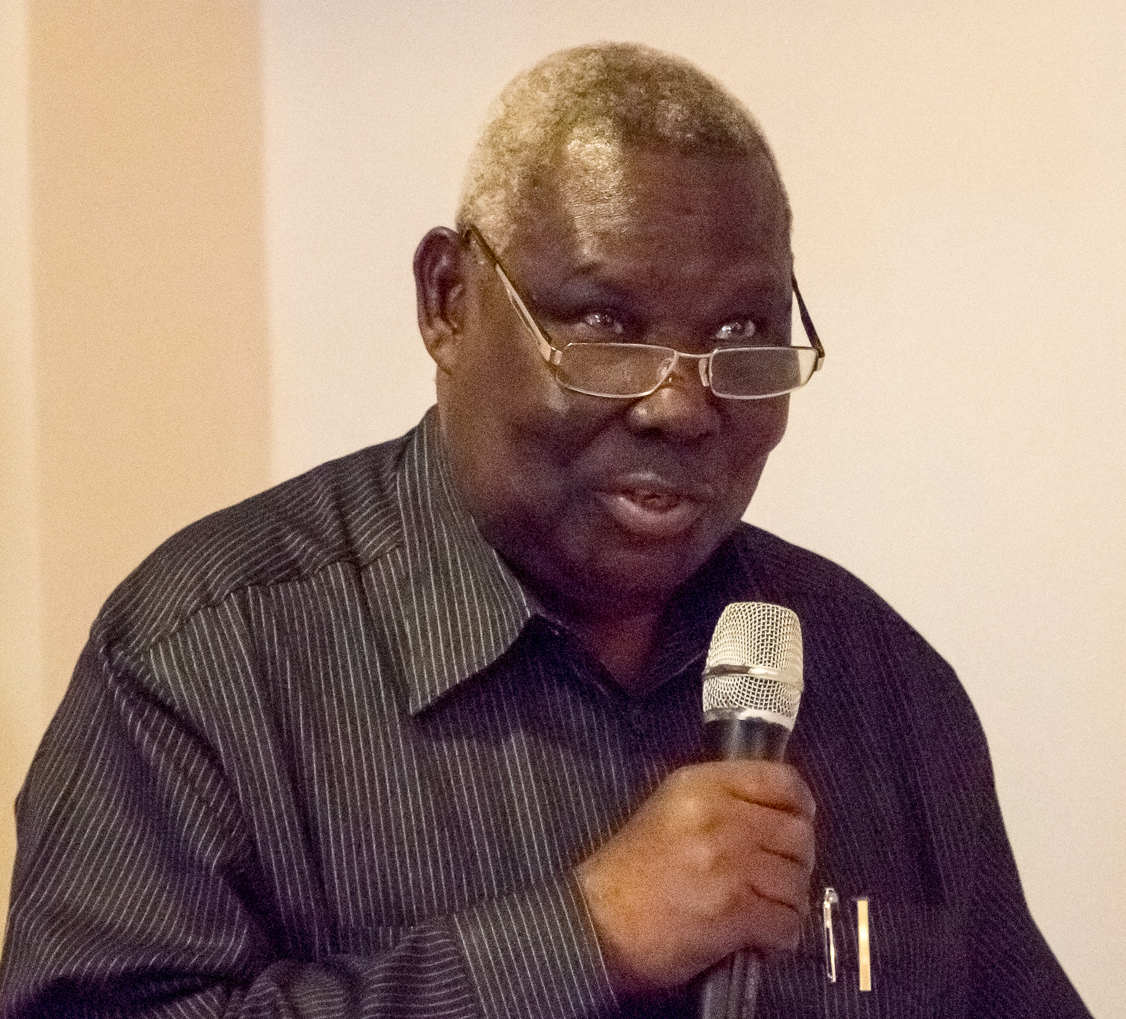

Second Vice President of Zanzibar
- In office November 2010 – November 2020
- President: Ali Mohamed Shein
- Succeeded by: Hemed Suleiman Abdalla

Member of Parliament for Kitope
- Incumbent
- Assumed office December 2005

Personal details
- Born: 23 February 1942 (age 84) Sultanate of Zanzibar, British protectorate (now in Tanzania)
- Party: CCM

Seif Ali Iddi (born 23 February 1942) is a Tanzanian politician (under CCM political party) and former 2nd Vice President of Zanzibar. He was a Member of Parliament for Kitope constituency from 2000 to 2010.
