= Juma Hassan Killimbah =

Tanzanian politician

Juma Hassan Killimbah (born 5 June 1966) is a Tanzanian politician and former member of the National Assembly between 2005 and 2010 representing the Iramba West constituency for the Chama Cha Mapinduzi (CCM). During the 2005-10 session, Killimbah was the sixth most active CCM member of the Assembly, in terms of parliamentary activities. In June 2008, he was a signatory to a petition of 500 parliamentarians world-wide calling for a United Nations Parliamentary Assembly. In the lead up to the 2010 general election, Killimbah was critical of government ministers from his own party who he claimed appeared more concerned with local constituents than with national issues.
