= Chambani =

National Historic Site of Tanzania

Chambani Ruins
- Location within Tanzania
- 5°19′40.8″S 39°47′4.56″E
- Type: Settlement
- Cultures: Swahili
- Location: Mkoani District, Pemba South Region, Tanzania

History
- Built: 12th century CE
- Abandoned: 14th century CE

Site notes
- Material: Coral rag
- Architectural styles: Swahili & Islamic
- Condition: Endangered
- Owner: Tanzanian Government
- Management: Antiquities Division, Ministry of Natural Resources and Tourism

National Historic Sites of Tanzania
- Official name: Chambani Historic Site
- Type: Cultural

Chambani (Magofu ya mji wa kale wa Chambani in Swahili ) is a historic site and village located in Mkoani District of Pemba South Region. Its one of several National Historic sites on the island of Pemba. The site is located nine kilometres south of Chake-Chake, close to several sets of ruins, notably the Pujini Ruins, a 15th-century citadel, located close to the village of Pujini, two kilometres to the north.

== See also ==
- Historic Swahili Settlements
