= 2011 Igunga by-election =

← 2010	2 October 2011	2015 →

The Igunga constituency in the Tanzanian Parliament
- Turnout: 53,672 (31.38%)
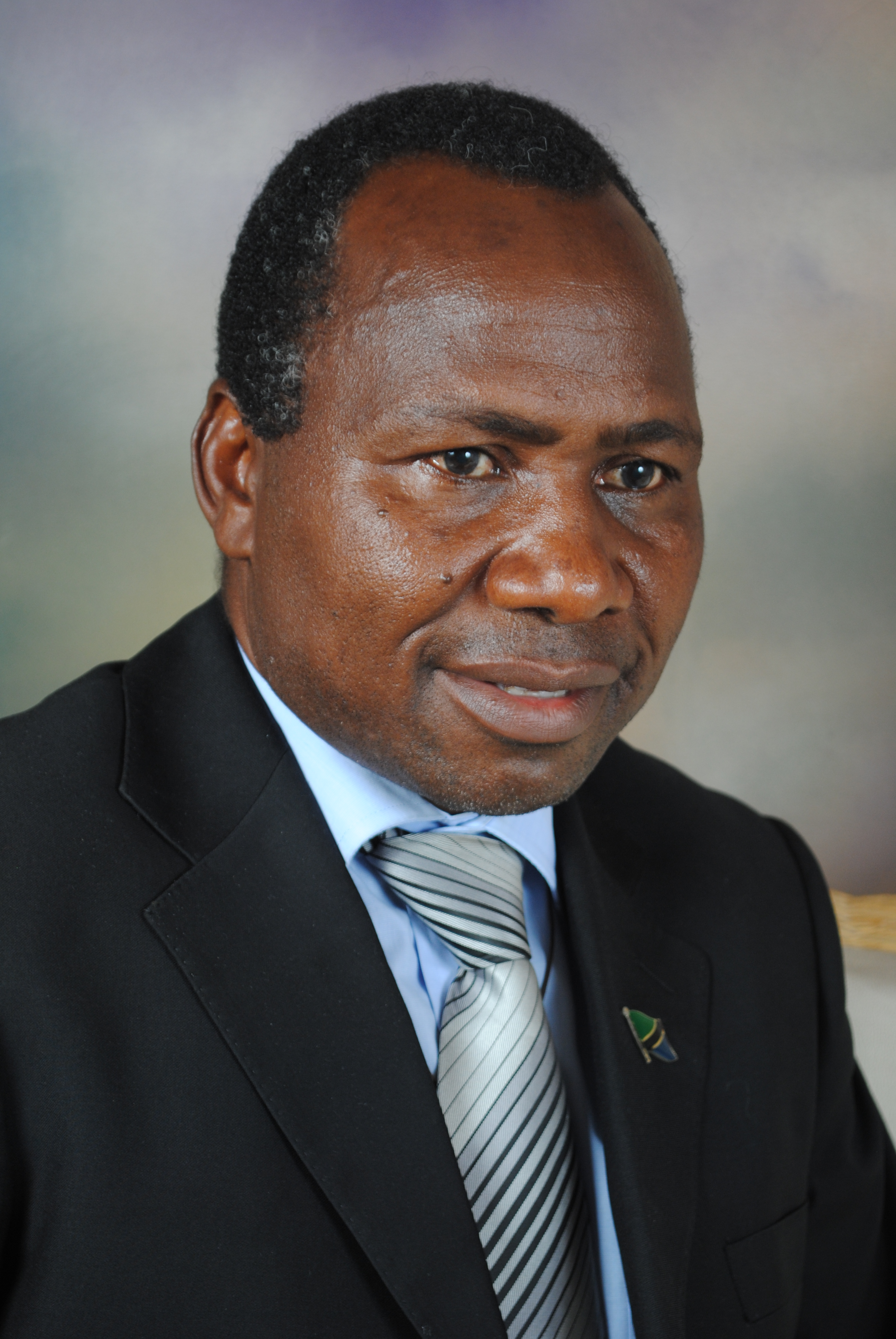

Candidate	Dalaly Kafumu	Kashindye Mwandu
Party	CCM	Chadema
Popular vote	26,484	23,260
Percentage	50.46	44.32
MP before election
Rostam Aziz
CCM
Elected MP
Dalaly Kafumu
CCM

The Igunga by-election was a by-election held for the Tanzanian parliamentary constituency of Igunga in Tabora Region. It was triggered by the resignation of Rostam Aziz, the previous Member of Parliament (MP) who had held the seat for the Chama Cha Mapinduzi since 1994. The by-election took place on 2 October 2011 and the CCM candidate won by 50.46%.

== Results ==
Election	Political result	Candidate	Party	Votes	%	±%
Igunga by-election, 2011; Resignation of Rostam Aziz; 1,185 spoilt votes Electorate: 171,019; Turnout: 53,672 (31.38%) +2.72	CCM hold Majority: 3,224 (6.14%)	Dalaly Kafumu	CCM	26,484	50.46	−22.32
Igunga by-election, 2011; Resignation of Rostam Aziz; 1,185 spoilt votes Electorate: 171,019; Turnout: 53,672 (31.38%) +2.72	CCM hold Majority: 3,224 (6.14%)	Kashindye Mwandu	Chadema	23,260	44.32	-
Igunga by-election, 2011; Resignation of Rostam Aziz; 1,185 spoilt votes Electorate: 171,019; Turnout: 53,672 (31.38%) +2.72	CCM hold Majority: 3,224 (6.14%)	Mahona Lucas	CUF	2,104	4.01	−19.09
Igunga by-election, 2011; Resignation of Rostam Aziz; 1,185 spoilt votes Electorate: 171,019; Turnout: 53,672 (31.38%) +2.72	CCM hold Majority: 3,224 (6.14%)	Steven Mahuvi	AFP	235	0.45	-
Igunga by-election, 2011; Resignation of Rostam Aziz; 1,185 spoilt votes Electorate: 171,019; Turnout: 53,672 (31.38%) +2.72	CCM hold Majority: 3,224 (6.14%)	Hassan Rutegema	CHAUSTA	182	0.35	-
Igunga by-election, 2011; Resignation of Rostam Aziz; 1,185 spoilt votes Electorate: 171,019; Turnout: 53,672 (31.38%) +2.72	CCM hold Majority: 3,224 (6.14%)	John Maguma	SAU	83	0.16	-
Igunga by-election, 2011; Resignation of Rostam Aziz; 1,185 spoilt votes Electorate: 171,019; Turnout: 53,672 (31.38%) +2.72	CCM hold Majority: 3,224 (6.14%)	Saidi Cheni	DP	76	0.15	-
Igunga by-election, 2011; Resignation of Rostam Aziz; 1,185 spoilt votes Electorate: 171,019; Turnout: 53,672 (31.38%) +2.72	CCM hold Majority: 3,224 (6.14%)	Hemedi Dedu	UPDP	63	0.12	+0.13
