= Kaliua District =

Kaliua Wilaya ya Kaliua
- District
- Kaluua District in Tabora Region
- Coordinates: 4.90775°S 31.689233°E
- Country: Tanzania
- Region: Tabora Region
- District: Kaliua
- Established: 2012
- Headquarters: Kaliua town

Government
  - Type: Council
  - Chairman: Japhael Masanja Lufungija
  - Director: Jerry Daimon Mwaga

Area
  - Total: 14,050 km^{2} (5,420 sq mi)
- Elevation: 1,105 m (3,625 ft)

Population (2022)
  - Total: 678,447
  - Density: 48.29/km^{2} (125.1/sq mi)
- Time zone: EAT
- Postcode: 45xxx
- Area code: 026
- Website: District Website

Kaliua District is one of the seven districts of the Tabora Region of Tanzania. It is bordered to the north by Kahama and Ushetu Districts, to the east by Uyui District and Urambo District, to the south by Katavi Region and to the west by Uvinza District and Geita Region. Its administrative seat is the town of Kaliua.

In 2016 the Tanzania National Bureau of Statistics report there were 442,182 people in the ward, from 393,358 in 2012. At the time of the 2022 census, 678,447 people were counted.

== Transport ==
Halfpaved Trunk road T18 from Tabora to Kigoma passes through the district.

The Tanzanian Central Line train - from Dar es Salaam to Kigoma - passes through the district. The train track to Mpanda branches off from the main line in Kaliua town.

== Administrative subdivisions ==
As of 2012, Kaliua District was administratively divided into 21 wards.

=== Wards ===
- Ichemba
- Igagala
- Igombe Mkulu
- Igwisi
- Kaliua
- Kamsekwa
- Kanindo
- Kanoge
- Kashishi
- Kazaroho
- Milambo
- Mwongozo
- Sasu
- Seleli
- Silambo
- Ugunga
- Ukumbisiganga
- Ushokola
- Usinge
- Usenye
- Uyowa
- Zugimlole
