= Uyui District =

District of Tabora Region, Tanzania

- District
- Country: Tanzania
- Region: Tabora Region

Area
  - Total: 11,966 km^{2} (4,620 sq mi)

Population (2022)
  - Total: 562,588
  - Density: 47.016/km^{2} (121.77/sq mi)

Uyui District is one of the seven districts of the Tabora Region of Tanzania. It is bordered to the north by Nzega District and Igunga District as well as by the Shinyanga Region, to the south by Sikonge District, to the west by Urambo District and Kaliua District, and to the east by the Singida Region. Tabora Urban District is an enclave within the Uyui District. Its administrative seat is the city of Tabora.

According to the 2002 Tanzania National Census, the population of the Uyui District was 281,101. The district includes the Mbola cluster of Millennium villages.

According to the 2012 Tanzania National Census, the population of Uyui District was 396,623. In 2022, the population was 562,588.

== Transport ==
Unpaved Trunk road T18 from Singida Region to Kigoma and unpaved trunk road T8 from Mbeya to Mwanza pass through the district.

The Tanzanian Central Line train - from Dar es Salaam to Kigoma - passes through the district.

== Administrative subdivisions ==
As of 2012, Uyui District was administratively divided into 24 wards.

=== Wards ===
- Bukumbi
- Goweko
- Ibelamilundi
- Ibiri
- Igalula
- Ikongolo
- Ilolanguru
- Isikizya
- Kigwa
- Kizengi
- Loya
- Lutende
- Mabama
- Magiri
- Miswaki
- Miyenze
- Ndono
- Nsimbo
- Nsololo
- Shitage
- Tura
- Ufuluma
- Upuge
- Usagari
