= Dalaly Kafumu =

Tanzanian politician

Honourable Dr Dalaly Peter Kafumu MP
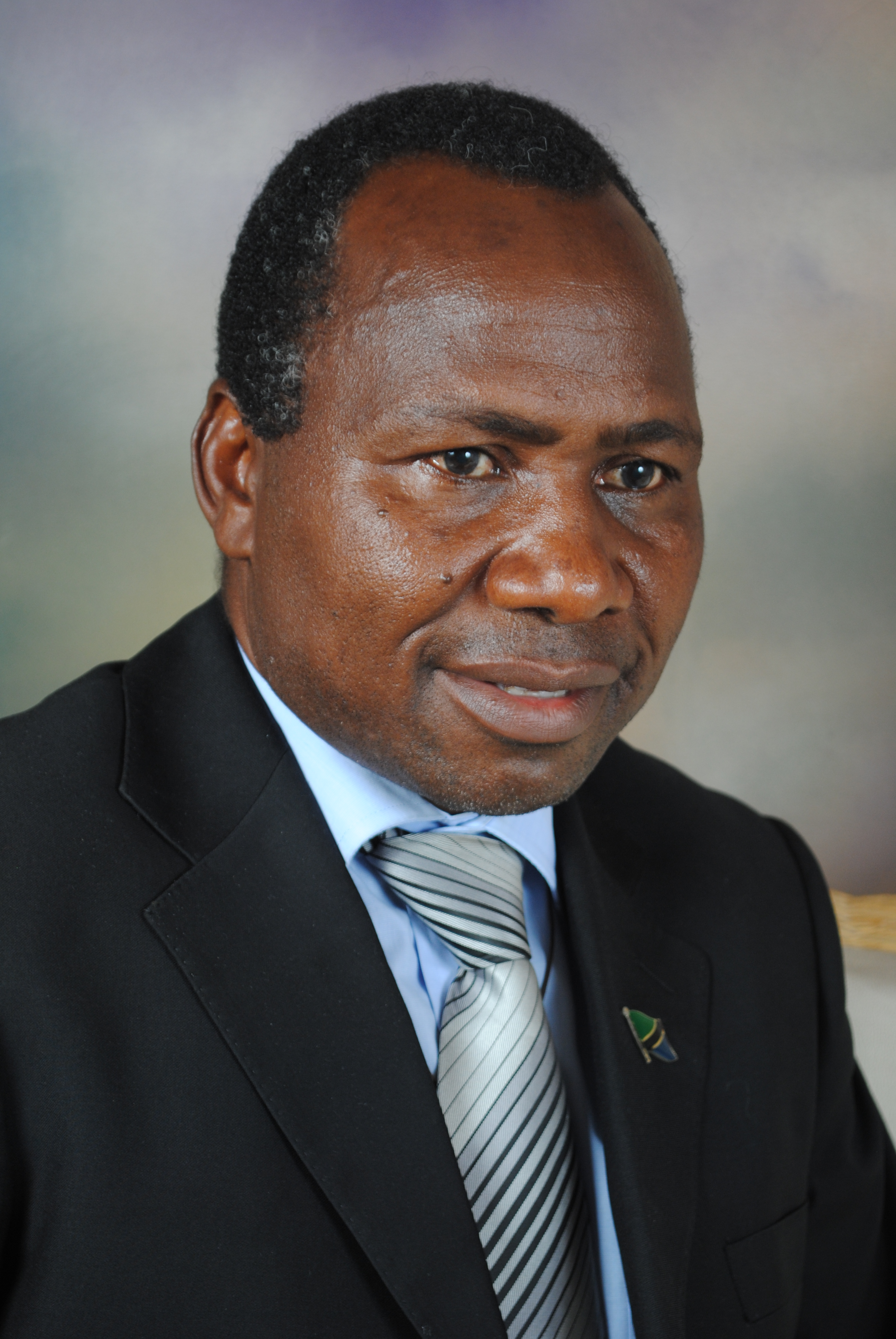

Member of Parliament for Igunga
- Incumbent
- Assumed office November 2011
- Preceded by: Rostam Aziz
- Majority: 26,484 (50.45%)

Personal details
- Born: 4 August 1957 (age 69) Itumba, Igunga, Tanganyika Territory
- Party: CCM
- Education: Milambo Secondary School; Mkwawa High School; University of Dar Es Salaam (Bsc), (PG Dip – Ed); Université libre de Bruxelles (Msc), DSc; Institute of Aeralspace Sciences (PG Dip – Mex)
- Profession: Geologist
- Committees: Energy and Minerals

Dr. Dalaly Peter Kafumu (born 4 August 1957) is a Tanzanian CCM politician and Member of Parliament for Igunga constituency since 2011.

== Early life and education ==
Kafumu was born on 4 August 1957 at Itumba Village in Igunga District. He was educated at the Itumba Primary School for Primary Education and Milambo Secondary School for his Ordinary Level Secondary Education. He attended Mkwawa High School for his Advanced Level Secondary Education. Kafumu obtained a B.Sc. Degree in Geology from the University of Dar es Salaam in 1983; and in 1987 Kafumu obtained a Postgraduate Diploma in Education from the University of Dar es Salaam. He also studied a Postgraduate Diploma in Mineral Exploration at the Institute of Aerospace Science in Delft, the Netherlands in 1991. He then obtained an M.Sc. and a Ph.D. Degrees in Geology from the Vrije Universiteit Brussel (Free University of Brussels) obtained in 1995 and 2000 respectively.

== Career ==
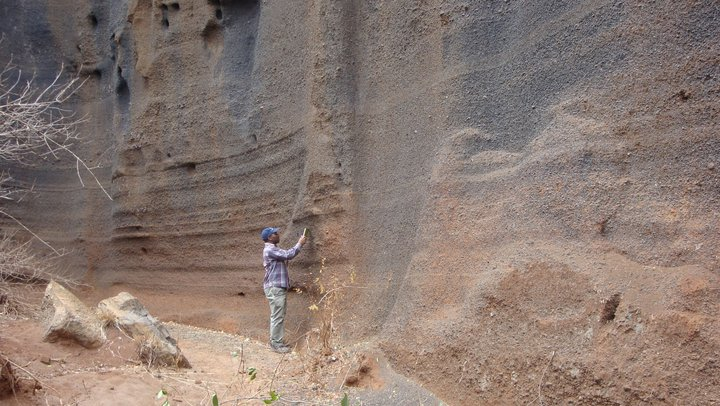
Dr Kafumu examining a geological section at Holili in northern Tanzania

He worked at the Geological Survey of Tanzania as an economic geologist responsible for mineral exploration and mining project evaluation, mapping and environmental management from 1983 until 1986. He became Vice Principal of the Mineral Resources Institute between 1986 and 1988 and went back to the Geological Survey of Tanzania as a Mineral Exploration Geologist until 2002. From 2002 to 2004 he worked as Head of Promotion and Statistics at the Ministry of Energy and Minerals, responsible for the promotion of investment in the Tanzania extractive industries sector. In 2004 he became the Communication Officer of the Ministry of Energy and Minerals with the responsibility of managing Government communication with stakeholders, partners and the public. In October 2006 he was appointed as the Commissioner for Minerals for the country to manage the fast-growing mineral sector, a post he held until August 2011 when he became a Member of Parliament.

=== Commissioner for Minerals ===
He became the Commissioner for Minerals in Tanzania for 6 years managing the mineral sector of Tanzania as per the Tanzania Mineral Policy of 2009 and the Mining Act of 2010 and its Regulations of 2010. Dr. Kafumu was responsible for issuing prospecting licenses, mines regulation and control and mining dispute resolutions while adhering to Government procedures and protocols. As a Commissioner for Minerals he acquired wide knowledge on how the extractive industries (particularly oil, gas and minerals) operate in Tanzania. This include policies and statues that govern the extractive industries; the programs implemented to develop the energy and mineral sectors; as well as the challenges encountered in executing governance, accountability and transparency in the extractive industries in promoting investment opportunities in the country. He was responsible for the establishment of the Tanzania Extractive Industries Transparency Initiative TEITI in Tanzania since its inception in 2008 and is proud to consider TEITI as one of his legacies. As part of the TEITI working Group he acquired knowledge, skills and insights on the EITI processes and activities. Kafumu was also a kingpin on advising the Government to review the Mineral Policy of Tanzania, 1997 and the Mining Act of 1998 into the Mineral Policy of Tanzania of 2009 and the Mining Act of 2010 and Mining Regulations of 2010, statutes that brought bigger benefits of mining industry in Tanzania. From 2006 to date at different times he was a Part-time lecturer in geology and environmental geomorphology at the Sokoine University of Agriculture and the University of Dodoma.

=== Political career ===
Ink point Stationery, Sinza Dar es salaam 0655152468 0785237381

== Selected publications ==
Books

- Macheyeki, A. S., Kafumu, P. D., Xiaohui, L., and Feng Y. (2020). Applied Geochemistry: Advances in Mineral exploration Techniques. 1st ed, Elsevier, 210p
- Kafumu, P. D. (2012a). Moyo Adili Dawa ya Rushwa: Ushairi wa Ngw’izukulushilinde; Graphic Solutions Ltd, 38p.
- Kafumu, P. D. (2012b). A Crying Voice: Personal Reflections. Graphic Solutions Ltd, 96p.

International journals, magazines and brochures

- Kafumu P. D. (2020.) The Geochemical Compositions and Origin of Sand Dunes in the Olduvai Gorge–Eastern Serengeti Plains, Northern Tanzania. Tanzania Journal of Science, 46 (2), 241-253.
- Kafumu, P. D., (2019). Invest in the Land of Tanzanite. 39th SADC Summit, Tanzania Magazine, August 17 – 18 2019, 33-34.
- Kafumu, P. D., (2005). Golden Returns for Tanzania: Mining Magazine 193(2) (pp20 – 30).
- Semkiwa, P. M., Kafumu, P. D., Ayub, S. Y., Petro, F. N., Kalemani, M. C., Nyelo, G. M., Rutaihwa, A. K., Ndonde, P. B., Ntulanalwo, V. B., Temu, E. B., Minde, A. B., and Salim, S. S., (Eds) (2005). Tanzania: – Opportunities for Mineral Resources Development. The Ministry of Energy and minerals; the United Republic of Tanzania. Dar es Salaam.
- Kafumu, P. D., (2004). Tanzania: Six mines in six years. Mining Journal, London, 4 June 2004; (pp18 – 20)
- Kafumu, P. D. (2004). Paleoclimatological significance of paleosol levels occurring in the Miocene – Pleistocene stratigraphy of the Manonga – WembereValley in Central Tanzania. Episodes 27(2), 107 – 111.
- Kafumu, P. D. and Paepe, R. (2003).The Quaternary stratigraphy and its associated fossil fauna and flora of the Holili area, NE Tanzania. Journal of African Earth Sciences 36, 245 – 250.
- Paepe, R., Van Overloop, E., Hoover, R. B., Nassopoulou, S., Kafumu, P. D. and Wang, D. (2003). Red Soils on Earth and their significance for Mars; In Richard B. Hoover, Alexei Yu Razanov and Roland Paepe (Eds) Instruments, Methods and Missions for Astrobiology; Proceedings of SPIE, Volume 4859, pp. 93 –107.
- Kafumu, P. D. (2002). Discussion: "Mineralogy and chemistry of bentonite(?) deposits of Minjingu, LakeManyara, North Tanzania" [By M K D Mutakyahwa, Vol 34(3–4) pp 213 – 221], Journal of African Earth Sciences 35(4) 523.
- Van Overloop, E., Paepe, R, Ilunga, L. P., Kaseba, S., Kafumu, P. D. and Musisi, J. (1998). The Quaternary geology around the Great Lakes in Central Africa: Pluvials and Interpluvials are not the equivalent of Glacials and Interglacials. In G. Demarree, J. Alexandre and M. De Dapper (eds); Climatology, Meteorology and hydrology in memory of Franz Bulton (1924–1995) pp 142 – 175. Brussels; Royal Meteorological Institute of Belgium and Royal Academy of Overseas Sciences, Brussels, Belgium.
- Muhongo, S., Kafumu, P. D. and Mfaume, P. (1996). Technical notes; List of geological sites (geo-sites) from East Africa; 9p: World Geological Heritage List: UNESCO,
