= Antoni Folkers =

Dutch architect, urbanist and researcher

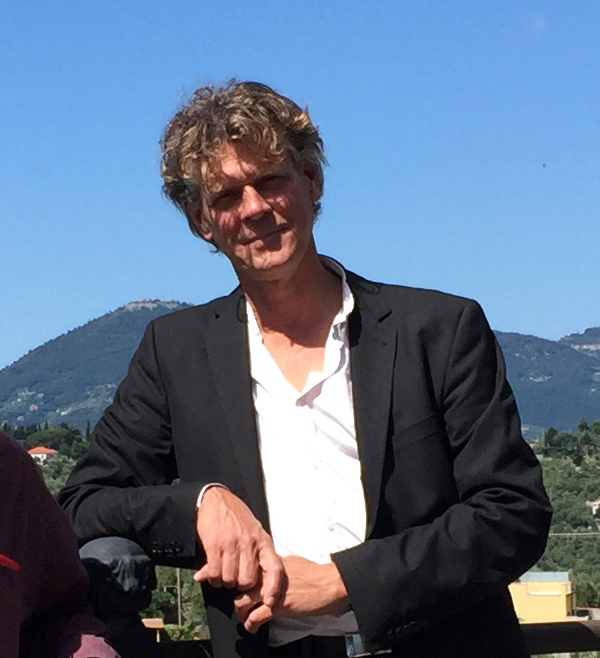
- Born: June 5, 1960 (age 66); Delft
- Education: TU Delft
- Occupation: Architect
- Years active: since 1987

Antoni Scholtens Folkers (born 1960) is a Dutch architect, urbanist and researcher. Folkers studied at the Faculty of Architecture and Urban Planning at Delft University of Technology where he also received his Ph.D. in 2011. His doctoral dissertation was later published as the book Modern Architecture in Africa. Folkers is one of the founding partners of the research and educational platforms ArchiAfrika and African Architecture Matters.

== Life and career ==
Antoni Folkers was born on 5 June 1960 in Delft, Netherlands. He commenced his education in Art and Art History at John Carroll University, Cleveland United States and Utrecht University in 1979. Folkers went on to study architecture and urban planning at TU Delft. During his years at the university, Folkers worked as a trainee at the office of the German architect Georg Lippsmeier – founder and owner of the L+P architects and the Institute for Tropical Building. An important turning-point in his early career as an architect and urban planner was his traineeship during the years 1984–1985 at the Direction Générale de l’Urbanisme et de la Topographie in Ouagadougou, Burkina Faso where he participated, among others, in the Wagadogo-Nossin District redevelopment and re-settlement project under the guidance of the Dutch urban planner Coen Beeker. After graduating from TU Delft, Folkers went on to work at the L+P architects' office in 1987 in Dar es Salaam, a city which also became his base for the next 25 years. In 1991 Folkers started an architectural partnership with Belinda van Buiten named as FBW after the British structural engineer Geoff Wilks joined the partnership in 1993. The company was divided in 2000 into FBW Group with its HQ in Uganda and Manchester and FBW Architects in the Netherlands. In years 1994 to 2014 Folkers collaborated closely with a project team including Belinda van Buiten, Thierry van Baggem and Saskia van Haren. Folkers continues to work in the Netherlands together with van Buiten as FBW Architects and as an independent architect and consultant in Africa.

=== Architecture and urban planning ===
Folkers’ work in the Netherlands focuses primarily on projects of socio-cultural nature and health care. Notable projects realized in the Netherlands are visitor centres in nature reserves, temporary shelter for homeless people Omnizorg in Apeldoorn and the restoration of Jongerius Villa in Utrecht. In Africa, Folkers’ works on projects primarily in Tanzania, Uganda, and Zanzibar. Notable architectural and urban projects are the Msasani Slipway complex in Dar es Salaam, Michenzani Green Corridors Plan and Mtoni Palace conservation project in Zanzibar.

=== ArchiAfrika and African Architecture Matters ===
In 2001 Folkers founded together with Berend van der Lans, Belinda van Buiten, Janneke Bierman and Joep Mol the NGO ArchiAfrika. The underlying aim of the NGO was to give Africa a more prominent place in the debate surrounding architecture. Early activities of the organization focused in particular on research concerning modern architecture in Africa.Together with ArchiAfrika, he initiated a series of conferences in years 2005-2009 known under the common name African Perspectives. Other notable ArchiAfrika projects are the documentary featuring the Tanzanian architect Anthony Almeida Many Words for Modern: Survey of Modern Architecture in Tanzania and Stars of Dar. After a decade of activity, the organization was handed over to a new Africa based team under the chairmanship of Joe Addo and has henceforth continued its operations from Ghana. In 2010 Folkers and van der Lans established the NGO African Architecture Matters (AAM).

=== Research ===
Folkers’ reflections on architecture and building in Africa were presented in the publication Modern Architecture in Africa. The book gives an account of Folkers' personal experience from work on the continent as an architect and urban planner and provides an outline, analysis, and comparison of a number of projects which are sat in the broader context of the history of African architecture.

In years 2006-2010 Folkers was involved in a research and conservation project on the Mtoni Palace located on the western coast of the Unguja Island (Zanzibar) which resulted in the publication Mtoni. Palace, Sultan & Princes of Zanzibar. His research on Zanzibar has also been concerned with the architecture and urban planning of Karume's Revolutionary Government. More recently, through the projects of AAM, he has also been involved in research on the urban history of Zanzibar Town.

== Notable projects ==
=== Masterplanning and urban planning ===
- Msasani Slipway, Dar es Salaam, Tanzania - redevelopment of the shipyard into a multiuse complex, encompassing retail, a hotel, restaurants, cafés, offices and studios, a mooring site and jetty (FBW Architects. Project architect: Antoni Folkers). 1989-ongoing .
- Ng’ambo Local Area Plan, Zanzibar Town, Zanzibar - Cooperation on the proposed urban development scheme for the Department of Urban and Rural Planning of the Government of Zanzibar, the City of Amsterdam and African Architecture Matters, commissioned by Rijksdienst voor Ondernemend Nederland (African Architecture Matters. Team leader, senior adviser and researcher: Antoni Folkers). 2013–2016.
- Butiama District Capital Structure Plan and Masterplan for the Julius Nyerere University for Science and Technology (FBW Architects. Project architect: Antoni Folkers). 2012–2015.

=== Restoration ===
- Jongerius Villa and Factory Complex, Utrecht, the Netherlands – restoration and adaptive re-use of the rundown factory complex in Utrecht including a villa, garden and an office (FBW Architects. Project architect: Antoni Folkers, restoration design: Belinda van Buiten, project team: Antoni Folkers, Belinda van Buiten, Saskia van Haren, Thierry van Baggem). 2007–2012.
- Rock-hewn Churches Lalibela, Ethiopia. Design of a protective shelter. International competition.not executed (FBW Architects. Design: van Buiten and Folkers. Engineering: ABT engineers Arnhem). 1999.
- St Joseph’ Cathedral, Dar es Salaam, Tanzania (L+P architects Dar es Salaam. Project architect: Antoni Folkers, design work: Belinda van Buiten). 1987–1991.

=== Health and education ===
- Centre Omnicare (Omnizorg), Apeldoorn, the Netherlands (FBW Architects. Project architect: Antoni Folkers, interior design: Belinda van Buiten). 2003–2008.
- Child Welfare Council offices, Almelo, the Netherlands (FBW Architects. Project architect: Antoni Folkers). 1999.
- The Phoenix, Park Bloeyendael, Utrecht, the Netherlands (FBW Architects. Project architect: Antoni Folkers). 1996–2000.
- St. Francis Turiani Hospital, Turiani, Tanzania (FBW Architects. Project architect: Antoni Folkers). 1992–2000.
- Tabora Deaf-Mute Institute, Tabora, Tanzania (FBW Architects. Project architect: Antoni Folkers). 1991–2000.
- Holy Family Virika Hospital, Fort Portal, Uganda (FBW Architects. Project architect: Antoni Folkers). 1991–2000.

== Prizes and awards ==
- 1st Prize spatial intervention province of Gelderland (project Omnizorg). On behalf of FBW Architects. 2010.
- 1st Prize bi-annual Dutch Daas Brick Award (project Omnizorg). On behalf of FBW Architects. 2010.
- 1st Prize Dutch environmental building (project BZC Veluwezoom). On behalf of FBW Architects. 2008.
- Honorary mention spatial intervention province of South Holland (project BZC Tenellaplas). On behalf of FBW Architects. 2006.
- Nomination for the master plan for the restoration of national cultural centre at Alden Biesen, Belgium (client Flemish Government). In close cooperation with van Buiten, Koen Ottenheym (architectural historian) and Gerrit Smienk (landscape design). 2002–2003.
- Honorary mention architectural prize Twente (project RvdK Almelo). On behalf of FBW Architects. 2001.
- Honorary mention national ideas competition on Royaal Wonen (project vdWel residence), On behalf of FBW Architects. 2000.
- Nomination for the master plan for Shelters for five rock-hewn churches in Lalibela, Ethiopia (client CCRHC, EC). In close cooperation with van Buiten (FBW) & ABT engineers. 1999–2000.
- Last round ideas competition on the Frederiksplein Amsterdam. In close cooperation with van Buiten. 1987.

== Major publications and articles ==
- Folkers, Antoni. Modern Architecture in Africa. Amsterdam: SUN Architecture, 2010.
- Folkers, Antoni, Abdul Sheriff, Anne-Katrien Denissen (ed.) Palace, Sultan & Princess of Zanzibar. Utrecht (ArchiAfrika).
- Folkers, Antoni and Heinz Kimmerle. Heer Bommel in Afrika – Religie en geloof in Marten Toonders universum en het Afrikaans animisme (2012).
- Folkers, Antoni, Berend van der Lans, Joep Mol (ed.) Proceedings: Conference Modern Architecture in Tanzania Around Independence. Utrecht (ArchiAfrika) 2005.
- “Architecture.” In Oxford Bibliographies in African Studies. Ed. Thomas Spear. New York: Oxford University Press.
- "Early Modern African Architecture. The House of Wonders Revisited." In: Docomomo, Journal 48, pp. 20–29.
- "Planning and Replanning Ng’ambo." In: South African Journal of Art History. Vol.29, Nr.1. pp. 35–49.
- "Urbanism in Africa." In: Kaleidoscope. Nr.15. pp. 64–70.
