= Sikonge =

- Town
- Sikonge
- Interactive map of Sikonge
- Coordinates: 05°38′S 032°46′E

Sikonge is a town and ward in Sikonge District, Tabora Region, Tanzania, East Africa. It is the administrative seat of Sikonge District. As of 2002, the ward had a population of 24,917.

The town of Sikonge falls into two main areas, the mission area and the shops. The Moravian Church (Christians) build their church and their mission adjacent to the town, but the area grew with the addition of schools, a hospital and a nursing college, as well as dwellings. On the shops side is where the Arab traders had their traditional market (bazaar), their warehouses and dwellings. On the shops side there is a government secondary school, a bank, the courts, and a Roman Catholic church.

== Administrative divisions ==
The ward of Sikonge is divided into the town of Sikonge and three villages: Mlogolo, Mkolye and Igalula

Langwa Secondary School is among the secondary schools in the district. This school was founded in 2007, April. Langwa secondary school is located at Kilolei, Mibono about 43 kilometers from Sikonge District Capital. Langwa was firstly headed by Mohamed Hamisi Saramba as an acting headmaster until September 2 when came a headmaster Ezekiel Rodon Machumu who headed it for almost one year until 2009 when he left the school with Mohamed Hamisi Saramba who headed it again until 201O when he went for studies at the University of Dar as Salaam at MUCE Campus in Iringa. He was succeeded by Jackson Mkaka as the headmaster for the school.
