= Sikonge District =

Coordinates: 05°38′S 032°46′E

- District
- Country: Tanzania
- Region: Tabora Region

Area
  - Total: 26,278 km^{2} (10,146 sq mi)

Population (2022 census)
  - Total: 335,686
  - Density: 12.774/km^{2} (33.086/sq mi)

Sikonge District is one of the seven districts of the Tabora Region of Tanzania. The town of Sikonge is the administrative seat. The district has an area of 27,873 square kilometres (10,762 sq mi), but 26,834 square kilometres (10,361 sq mi) of it is in forest and game reserves. It is bordered to the northwest by Urambo District, to the north by Uyui District, to the east by Manyoni District of Singida Region, to the south by Chunya District of Mbeya Region, and to the southwest by Mlele District of Katavi Region.

As of 2002, the population of Sikonge District was 133,388.

According to the 2012 Tanzania National Census, the population of Sikonge District was 179,883. By 2022, the population had increased to 335,686.

== History ==
Sikonge District was gazetted in July 1996, but didn't officially start to function as a district until 1997. The area had previously been the Sikonge Division of Tabora District.

== Transport ==
Unpaved Trunk road T8 from Tabora to Mbeya passes through the district. At the village of Ipole unpaved trunk road T23 to Mpanda branches off.

The Tanzanian Central Line train - from Dar es Salaam to Kigoma - passes through a small portion of the northern part of the district.

== Administrative divisions ==
Sikonge District is administratively divided into two divisions, Sikonge Division and Kiwere Division. Its eleven wards encompass the town of Sikonge, fifty-two villages and 230 hamlets. Sikonge District has a single electoral constituency, Sikonge Constituency, and thus only one member in the National Assembly.

As of 2012, Sikonge District was administratively divided into 17 wards.

=== Wards ===
- Chabutwa
- Igigwa
- Ipole
- Kaloleli
- Kiloli
- Kipanga
- Kipili
- Kisanga
- Kitunda
- Misheni
- Mole
- Mpombwee
- Ngoywa
- Pangale
- Sikonge
- Tutuo
- Usunga
