= Gongoni, Tabora =

Ward in Tabora Urban District, Tabora Region

Gongoni Kata ya Gongoni (Swahili)
- Ward
- Kata ya Gongoni, Jiji la Tabora
- Location within Tanzania
- Country: Tanzania
- Region: Tabora Region
- District: Tabora Urban District

Area
  - Total: 0.924 km^{2} (0.357 sq mi)
- Elevation: 1,206 m (3,957 ft)

Population (2012)
  - Total: 8,064
  - Density: 8,730/km^{2} (22,600/sq mi)

Gongoni is an administrative ward in Tabora Urban District of Tabora Region in Tanzania. The ward covers an area of 0.924 km^{2} (0.357 sq mi), and has an average elevation of 1,206 m (3,957 ft). According to the 2012 census, the ward has a total population of 8,064.
