= Cheyo, Tabora =

Ward in Tabora Urban District, Tanzania

Cheyo Kata ya Cheyo (Swahili)}
- Ward
- Kata ya Cheyo, Jiji la Tabora
- Location within Tanzania
- Country: Tanzania
- Region: Tabora Region
- District: Tabora Urban District

Area
  - Total: 12.94 km^{2} (5.00 sq mi)
- Elevation: 1,198 m (3,930 ft)

Population (2012)
  - Total: 11,399
  - Density: 880.9/km^{2} (2,282/sq mi)

Cheyo is an administrative ward in Tabora Urban District of Tabora Region in Tanzania. The ward covers an area of 12.94 km^{2} (5.00 sq mi), and has an average elevation of 1,198 m (3,930 ft). According to the 2012 census, the ward has a total population of 11,399.
