= Mbola, Tanzania =

Mbola
- Location within Tanzania
- Coordinates: 5.022905°S 32.610093°E
- Country: Tanzania
- Region: Tabora
- District: Uyui

Population (2011)
  - Total: 30,000

Mbola is a cluster of Millennium Village in the Uyui district of Tanzania, home to about 30,000 people as of 2011.
