= Isevya =

Ward in Tabora Urban District, Tabora Region

Isevya Ward Kata ya Isevya (Swahili)
- Ward
- Kata ya Isevya, Jiji la Tabora
- Location within Tanzania
- Country: Tanzania
- Region: Tabora Region
- District: Tabora Urban District

Area
  - Total: 2.90 km^{2} (1.12 sq mi)
- Elevation: 1,200 m (3,900 ft)

Population (2012)
  - Total: 13,507
  - Density: 4,660/km^{2} (12,100/sq mi)

Isevya is an administrative ward in Tabora Urban District of Tabora Region in Tanzania. The ward covers an area of 2.90 km^{2} (1.12 sq mi), and has an average elevation of 1,200 m (3,900 ft). According to the 2012 census, the ward has a total population of 13,507.
