= Yawkasakrom =

- Village
- Country: Ghana
- Region: Ashanti Region
- District: Amansie South District
- Time zone: GMT
  - Summer (DST): GMT

Yawkasakrom is a village in the Amansie South District in the Ashanti Region of Ghana. The village is known for its gold and shares boundary with Bonsaaso.

It has the Yawkasakrom D/A Primary School, a six-unit block donated by the Millennium Project. In 2014, a 3-room teachers quarters was donated to the people of Yawkasakrom by Awudra Ventures.
