= Mbugani, Tabora =

Ward in Tabora Urban District, Tabora Region

Mbugani Ward Kata ya Mbugani (Swahili)
- Ward
- Kata ya Mbugani, Jiji la Tabora
- Location within Tanzania
- Country: Tanzania
- Region: Tabora Region
- District: Tabora Urban District

Area
  - Total: 6.99 km^{2} (2.70 sq mi)
- Elevation: 1,191 m (3,907 ft)

Population (2012)
  - Total: 15,301
  - Density: 2,190/km^{2} (5,670/sq mi)

Mbugani is an administrative ward in Tabora Urban District of Tabora Region in Tanzania. The ward covers an area of 6.99 km^{2} (2.70 sq mi), and has an average elevation of 1,191 m (3,907 ft). According to the 2012 census, the ward has a total population of 15,301.
