= Rostam Aziz =

Tanzanian businessman and politician

- رستم عزیز

Member of Parliament (MP) for Igunga Constituency
- In office 1994 – 13 July 2011
- Succeeded by: Dalaly Kafumu

Personal details
- Born: 21 August 1960 (age 66) Tabora Region, Tanzania
- Party: Chama Cha Mapinduzi
- Children: 4
- Occupation: Businessman, Investor, Politician

Rostam Abdulrasul Aziz (sometimes spelled Azizi) is a Tanzanian businessman, economist and former politician. In 2013, according to Forbes Magazine he was the first Tanzanian dollar billionaire with a net worth of over 10 billion dollars, and according to Henley & Partners Africa wealth report 2022, was the only dollar billionaire in East Africa.

He represented the Igunga constituency in Tabora Region from 1994 until his resignation in 2011. He was the ruling party Chama Cha Mapinduzi (CCM) National Treasurer from 2005 to 2007 and member of the Politburo/Central Committee of CCM from 2006 to 2011. Some of the key achievements during his time as an MP include that he pioneered community health insurance in East Africa and every household in his constituency was provided with health insurance from the Community Health Fund. He also achieved access to water for every resident in his constituency and Igunga Constituency became the first district to have a dispensary in every village and electricity in every ward.

According to Forbes magazine Rostam Aziz of Tanzania owns nearly 18% of Vodacom Tanzania, the country's largest mobile phone company, with 15 million subscribers. Rostam, via Cavalry Holdings, previously owned 35% of the company, but, in May 2014 he sold 17.2% of Vodacom Tanzania to Vodacom Group of South Africa for an estimated $250 million. In 2019 he sold his remaining stake in Vodacom Tanzania through his investment vehicle Mirambo Holdings for US$220 million.

In March 2026, Nation Media Group announced that he had purchased 54% of the company from Aga Khan Development Network.

He also owns MIC Tanzania Plc (TIGO Tanzania and Zantel Ltd), Taifa Gas Group, Caspian mining, a contract mining firm in Tanzania, and real estate in Dubai and Oman. Aziz got his start in his family's trading business and then branched out on his own.

== Background ==
Rostam was born in Igunga District of Tabora Region, where he completed his schooling before proceeding to the United Kingdom for higher education. He completed his Bachelor in Economics from Exeter.

During his political career Rostam was appreciated by former Tanzanian president Benjamin William Mkapa in his memoir, for the formation of the National Health Insurance. He worked on improving the water supply in his constituency Igunga, which became the first district to have a dispensary in every village and electricity connection in every ward.

== Overview ==
Rostam investments range from telecoms, energy, mining, agriculture, media, real estate, port facilities and services.

His holdings include:

- Shareholding in Vodacom Tanzania, the leading mobile telephone network in the country, a subsidiary of Vodafone.
- Caspian Limited, the largest contract mining company in Tanzania. Mining contractor to DeBeers, Barrick Gold and others.
- MIC Tanzania Plc( TiGO Tanzania) together with Axian-Telecoms.
- Taifa Gas Group the leading LPG energy supplier in East and Southern Africa.
- Ace Leather Tanzania
- Nation Media Group, majority shareholder.
