= Urambo District =

District of Tabora Region, Tanzania

Coordinates: 5°00′S 31°55′E

Urambo
- District
- Etymology: named for King Mirambo
- Country: Tanzania
- Region: Tabora Region

Area
  - Total: 5,415 km^{2} (2,091 sq mi)

Population (2022)
  - Total: 260,322
  - Density: 48.07/km^{2} (124.5/sq mi)

Urambo is one of the seven districts of the Tabora Region of Tanzania. It is bordered to the north by the Kaliua District, to the east by the Uyui District, to the southeast by the Sikonge District, and to the southwest by the Katavi Region. Its administrative seat is the town of Urambo.

== Etymology ==
The name "Urambo" (Nyamwezi language: ) meaning Home of the Urambo, a 19th century kingdom of the Nyamwezi people.

== History ==
In the 19th century, Urambo was a kingdom. It came about under the leadership of King Mirambo, who united the territory of Uyowa, which had been ruler by his father, with Ulyankhulu.

== Geography ==
Southern Urambo district is the Ugalla River National Park

== Demographics ==
According to the 2002 Tanzania National Census, the population of the Urambo District was 260,322.

Between 2002 and 2012, Kaliua District was split off from Urambo District. That is why the population of Urambo District declined in this period. According to the 2012 Tanzania National Census, the population of Urambo District was 192,781.

== Economy ==
Unpaved Trunk road T18 from Tabora to Kigoma passes through the district.

The Tanzanian Central Line train - from Dar es Salaam to Kigoma - passes through the district. There is a train station in Urambo town.

== Government ==
In 2002, Urambo District was administratively divided into 26 wards. As of 2012, only 16 wards remained after Kaliua District was split off.

=== Wards ===
- Imalamakoye
- Kapilula
- Kasisi
- Kiloleni
- Muungano
- Nsenda
- Songambele
- Ugalla
- Ukondamoyo
- Urambo
- Usisya
- Ussoke
- Itundu
- Uyogo
- Uyumbu
- Vumilia (English meaning: tolerate)

== Sources ==
- Urambo District Homepage for the 2002 Tanzania National Census
