= Tabora Urban District =

- District
- Coordinates: 05°01′S 32°48′E
- Country: Tanzania
- Region: Tabora Region

Area
  - Total: 1,461 km^{2} (564 sq mi)

Population (2022 census)
  - Total: 308,741
  - Density: 211.3/km^{2} (547.3/sq mi)
- Area code: 026

Tabora Urban is one of the seven districts in the Tabora Region of Tanzania. This district is mostly the city of Tabora and its suburbs. It is bordered almost completely by the Uyui District. It has a small border with Nzega District to the north. Its administrative seat is the city of Tabora.

According to the 2002 Tanzania National Census, the population of the Tabora Urban District was 188,808.

According to the 2012 Tanzania National Census, the population of Tabora Urban District was 226,999.

== History ==
The history of Tabora town can be traced back to 1830 when it was called “Unyamwezi”. During the slave trade in mid-1840s, the Arabs constructed a base in the town.

Tabora Municipality is 800 km (500 mi) west of Dar es Salaam, 320 km (200 mi) east of Kigoma port on the shores of Lake Tanganyika, and 360 km (220 mi) south of Mwanza city. The climate of the district is generally hot (20 to 32 degrees), with relative humidity ranging from 25 to 65% and the rain fall ranges from 650 to 850 mm (26 to 33 in) per year.

The Municipality is projected to have a total population of 197,825 people according to the 2002 census and a growth rate of 2.36 annually; within the jurisdiction area of 1092.26 square kilometres.

The literacy rate of the population in Tabora Municipality is 56% which has implications for health awareness. The Municipality is reasonably well connected through rail, roads and air services, although the main means of transportation is the railway. Even though the roads cover a fairly large percentage of the municipality, the condition of the roads has been deteriorating due to lack of funds for maintenance and the building of new roads and this adversely impacts access to health care services.

In the Municipality, agriculture is the main economic activity, focusing on maize, rice, groundnuts, beans, cowpeas, cassava, sweet potatoes and tobacco. Tabora is also famous for beekeeping (honey and beeswax) and forest timbering activities. Livestock farming is also an important economic activity in the region.

Much of the arable land in Tabora Municipality has been degraded due to poor irrigation practices and an increasing demand for land for agriculture, grazing and firewood. The industrial sector employs about 8929 people, 13.5% of which are in the formal sector.

There are various commercial activities varying in size and encompassing various retail activities such as groceries, stationery, hotel, bars, guesthouses, restaurants, cinema, pharmacies etc. Commercial activities are mainly concentrated in the central area, while the rural areas are largely poorly serviced. In summary, the low incomes of the population, low productivity of land and the existence of poor infrastructure influences the low health quality of the population and their access to health services.

Tabora acquired a Township council status in 1958 and was raised to municipal council July 1988. Administratively, the Municipality is subdivided into 21 wards; 8 rural and 13 urban. The urban wards are subdivided into 116 streets, while the rural wards are subdivided into 24 villages that are further subdivided into 117 hamlets.

The Municipal council has 9 departments: health, finance, economic planning and trade, education, agriculture, livestock and cooperatives, community development, works, town planning and environment, and administration and personnel. Municipality's economic base depends on the services sector provided by both central and local governments. Other economic activities in the Municipality are public services, commerce, small enterprises, industry, small-scale agriculture and forestry.

== Industrial development ==
The climate of the Tabora region favours forestry, livestock and agriculture processing industries. In the 1960s and 1970s, Tabora was popular in timber processing industries and brands like Tabora Misitu was a common name. On the other hand, beekeeping industry was highly developed and Tabora Beekeepers Cooperative Union located at Kipalapala in Itetemia Ward was glorious with exports to West Germany, Britain, United States and other western countries reaching more than 200,000 tons in 1989. In 1992 Tabora Beekeepers won certification from the Soil Association and Organic Standards of Bristol, UK as producers of organic beeswax and honey. The famous blue label honey packs popularly called African Queen has now lost its glorious moments and the industry is in poor conditions following the liberalization of honey buying and selling business.

== Transport ==
=== Major road links ===
Unpaved Trunk road T18 from Singida Region to Kigoma and unpaved trunk road T8 from Mbeya to Mwanza pass through the district.

=== Railway links ===
The Tanzanian Central Line train - from Dar es Salaam to Kigoma - passes through the district. There is a main train station in the city of Tabora. The segment from Tabora to Mwanza branches off at this station.

=== Airport ===
Tabora Airport is located 7 kilometers south of the centre of Tabora town. Renovation of the airport was completed in 2015 and Precision Air started flying to the airport on Monday, Wednesday and Friday, from Dar es Salaam and Kigoma.

== Administrative subdivisions ==
As of 2012, Tabora Urban District was administratively divided into 25 wards.

=== Wards ===
1. Chemchem
2. Cheyo
3. Gongoni
4. Ifucha
5. Ikomwa
6. Ipuli
7. Isevya
8. Itetemia
9. Itonjanda
10. Kabila
11. Kakola
12. Kalunde
13. Kanyenye
14. Kiloleni
15. Kitete
16. Malolo
17. Mbugani
18. Misha
19. Mtendeni
20. Ndevelwa
21. Ng'ambo
22. Ntalikwa
23. Tambukareli
24. Tumbi
25. Uyui

== Sources ==
- Tabora Urban District Homepage for the 2002 Tanzania National Census
