= Chemchem, Tabora =

Ward in Tabora Region, Tanzania

Chemchem Kata ya Chemchem (Swahili)
- Ward
- Kata ya Chemchem, Jiji la Tabora
- Location within Tanzania
- Country: Tanzania
- Region: Tabora Region
- District: Tabora Urban District

Area
  - Total: 7.650 km^{2} (2.954 sq mi)
- Elevation: 1,200 m (3,900 ft)

Population (2012)
  - Total: 19,980
  - Density: 2,612/km^{2} (6,764/sq mi)

Chemchem is an administrative ward in Tabora Urban District of Tabora Region in Tanzania. The ward covers an area of 7.650 km^{2} (2.954 sq mi), and has an average elevation of 1,200 m (3,900 ft). According to the 2012 census, the ward has a total population of 19,980.
