= Ikomwa =

Ward in Tabora Urban District, Tabora Region

Ikomwa Kata ya Ikomwa (Swahili)
- Ward
- Kata ya Ikomwa, Jiji la Tabora
- Location within Tanzania
- Country: Tanzania
- Region: Tabora Region
- District: Tabora Urban District

Area
  - Total: 99.92 km^{2} (38.58 sq mi)
- Elevation: 1,147 m (3,763 ft)

Population (2012)
  - Total: 7,152
  - Density: 71.58/km^{2} (185.4/sq mi)

Ifucha is an administrative ward in Tabora Urban District of Tabora Region in Tanzania. The ward covers an area of 99.92 km^{2} (38.58 sq mi), and has an average elevation of 1,147 m (3,763 ft). According to the 2012 census, the ward has a total population of 7,152.
