= Ifucha =

Ward in Tabora Urban District, Tabora Region

Ifucha Kata ya Ifucha (Swahili)
- Ward
- Kata ya Ifucha, Jiji la Tabora
- Location within Tanzania
- Country: Tanzania
- Region: Tabora Region
- District: Tabora Urban District

Area
  - Total: 81.3 km^{2} (31.4 sq mi)
- Elevation: 1,232 m (4,042 ft)

Population (2012)
  - Total: 3,219
  - Density: 39.6/km^{2} (103/sq mi)

Ifucha is an administrative ward in Tabora Urban District of Tabora Region in Tanzania. The ward covers an area of 81.31 km^{2} (31.39 sq mi), and has an average elevation of 1,232 m (4,042 ft). According to the 2012 census, the ward has a total population of 3,219.
