= Grace Gobbo =

Botanist

- Born: 1974 (age 51–52); Tabora, Tanzania
- Known for: Ethnobotany

Grace Gobbo (born 1974 in Tabora, Tanzania) is an ethnobotanist studying traditional medicines used by healers in Tanzania. Gobbo works to interview healers and record the plants they use in an effort to identify indigenous plants for medicinal uses. Gobbo earned a Bachelor's degree in Development Studies from Kimmage Development Studies Centre and pursued further education at the Department of International Development at Maynooth University.

== Background ==
Growing up in a Christian family with a doctor for a father, Gobbo originally dismissed traditional healing as witchcraft. After her coursework in botany exposed her to new evidence, Gobbo began interviewing traditional healers who described their success using plants to treat a wide range of ailments.

== Career ==
Gobbo has worked on several projects for the Jane Goodall Institute. She has worked with the USAID-funded Gombe-Masito-Ugalla ecosystem program to work reintroduce sustainable agricultural techniques, including agroforestry, to the ecosystem and surrounding communities. Gobbo also developed and co-led workshops with Aristides Kashula on fire management trainings with villagers around the Greater Gombe Ecosystem for the Jane Goodall Institute. The workshops engage attendees in their own experiences with fire, explain basics of fire and fire management, and helps the villagers develop fire management plans. In the workshops, Gobbo highlights the environmental benefits of trees, and what is lost when trees are lost to fire. Gobbo has also worked with the Jane Goodall Institute's Gombe Stream Research Centre to gather information about traditional healers and the medicinal plants they use around the Gombe. She held workshops with traditional healers to share information about medicinal plants and show the value of conserving forests.

Gobbo has received several grants from the National Geographic Society for her efforts. To date, she has recorded information shared by more than 80 healers, entering notes and photographs about plants and their uses into a computer database. Gobbo co-wrote an ethnobotanical booklet about Ha plant use in the village of Bubango, Tanzania with Maria Fadiman, which promotes East African forest conservation through cultural connection to plants. The village borders the miombo woodland of Gombe Stream National Park and Lake Tanganyika. Gobbo has worked with the Bubango villagers for several years, and the villagers invited her and Fadiman to help them develop an ethnobotanical booklet about the local plants. The books is in Kiha but is designed so that it can be understood by people who do not understand Kiha or are illiterate. The booklet is helping preserve ethnobotanical knowledge that otherwise might be lost to time and declines in biodiversity. To ensure the continuation of their work, they are partnering with two local nonprofit organizations, Tanzania Botanical Research and Conservation Program and Cross Community Connect.

== Awards ==
Gobbo was the winner of the 2007 WINGS field research award. Gobbo received a grant from the National Geographic/Howard G. Buffett Fund for East Africa to create an ethnobotanical booklet. She has also received grants and support from the National Geographic/Catherine B. Reynolds Foundation Emerging Explorer program.
