= Tabora Deaf-Mute Institute =

Catholic school in Tanzania

Coordinates: 5.018894977°S 32.812339103°E

Information
- Established: 1963; 63 years ago

Tabora Deaf-Mute Institute was founded in 1963 by the Roman Catholic Mission in Tabora, Tanzania. It was the first school for the deaf in Tanzania.

Its programming is aimed at school-age children.

The building was designed by Dutch architect Antoni Folkers.
