= Kaliua =

- Location in Tanzania
- Coordinates: 5°3′38″S 31°47′37″E
- Country: Tanzania
- Region: Tabora
- Elevation: 3,648 ft (1,112 m)
- Time zone: UTC+3 (East Africa Time)
- Climate: Aw

Kaliua is a town in Tabora Region in western Tanzania.

== Transport ==
It lies on the Central Railway of Tanzania, at the junction of a branch line opened in 1949 to Mpanda.
