= ArchiAfrika =

ArchiAfrika is a non-profit organisation concerned with the architecture of Africa.

== History ==
ArchiAfrika was founded in 2001 by a group of Dutch architects, including Antoni Folkers, who had spent many years in Africa. When they returned to the Netherlands, they discovered that African architecture was relatively unknown in the Western world and wanted to do something in order to change this situation. After their experience in Africa, they were convinced that African architecture and African architectural history are rich in depth and variety and that the rest of the world has much to gain from a stronger position of African architects within the international architectural debate and more knowledge of African Architecture in general.

== Mission ==
ArchiAfrika's aim is to put African architecture on the map, to ensure that African Architecture is represented within the international architectural debate, to contribute to the understanding and development of African architecture by offering a platform for the exchange of knowledge and information on activities, people and projects dealing with architecture in Africa, and to stimulate the dialogue between Africa and the rest of the world on African architecture.

== Beneficiaries ==
ArchiAfrika's target group consists of architects, urban planners, teachers, students and academics involved in architecture and cultural, governmental and housing institutions.

== Strategy ==
ArchiAfrika aims to reach the above-mentioned goals by:

- collecting data on African architecture and making this data accessible to the target group through
  - a website
  - a search engine on African architecture
  - a newsletter on African architecture
- organizing conferences around different subjects linked to African architecture
- stimulating research on African architecture
- working on projects that introduce African contemporary architecture into the discussion and practice of Western Architecture.

== Projects ==
- African Perspectives
  - July 2005 – Dar es Salaam, Tanzania: Modern Architecture in East Africa around independence
  - June 2007 - Kumasi, Ghana: African Architecture Today\
  - December 2007 – Delft, The Netherlands: African Perspectives 2007 – Dialogues on Urbanism and Architecture
  - September 2009 – Pretoria/Tshwane, South Africa: African Perspectives 2009 – The African City CENTRE: (re)sourced
- The African House - Past, Present and Future
- Documentation centre on African Architecture
- Mtoni Palace Publication
- Searching African Architecture
