= Nzega District =

District of Tabora Region, Tanzania

Coordinates: 4°20′S 33°05′E

- District
- Nzega District of Tabora Region.
- Country: Tanzania
- Region: Tabora Region

Area
  - Total: 7,173 km^{2} (2,770 sq mi)

Population (2022)
  - Total: 574,498
  - Density: 80.09/km^{2} (207.4/sq mi)

Nzega District is one of the seven districts of the Tabora Region of Tanzania. It is bordered to the north by Shinyanga Region, to the south and southwest by Uyui District and to the east by Igunga District. Its administrative seat is the town of Nzega.

== Demographics ==
According to the 2002 Tanzania National Census, the population of Nzega District was 417,097.

According to the 2012 Tanzania National Census, the population of Nzega District was 502,252.

According to the 2022 Tanzania National Census, the population of Nzega District was 574,498.

== Transport ==
Paved Trunk road T3 from Morogoro to the Rwanda border and T8 from Tabora to Mwanza pass through the district. These roads meet in Nzega town.

The Tanzanian Central Line train - from Tabora to Mwanza - passes through the district from south to north. A train station is located in Bukene.

== Administrative subdivisions ==
As of 2012, Nzega District was administratively divided into 37 wards.

=== Wards ===
- Budushi
- Bukene
- Igusule
- Ijanija
- Ikindwa
- Isagenhe
- Isanzu
- Itilo
- Itobo
- Kahamanhalanga
- Karitu
- Kasela
- Lusu
- Magengati
- Mambali
- Mbogwe
- Miguwa
- Milambo Itobo
- Mizibaziba
- Mogwa
- Muhugi
- Mwakashanhala
- Mwamala
- Mwangoye
- Nata
- Ndala
- Nkiniziwa
- Nzega Mjini
- Nzegandogo
- Puge
- Semembela
- Shigamba
- Sigili
- Tongi
- Uduka
- Utwigu
- Wela

== Sources ==
- Nzega District Homepage for the 2002 Tanzania National Census
