= Millennium Villages Project =

Anti-poverty productivity booster demonstration program in Africa

The Millennium Villages Project (MVP) was a demonstration project headed by the American economist Jeffrey Sachs under the auspices of the Earth Institute at Columbia University, the United Nations Development Programme, and Millennium Promise with the goal of achieving the U.N.'s Millennium Development Goals in rural Africa by 2015.

The project, described by the MVP as "a bold, innovative model for helping rural African communities lift themselves out of extreme poverty," was intended to prove the merits of a holistic, integrated, approach to rural development as outlined in Sachs' bestselling 2005 book The End of Poverty. As described by Bill Gates, whose foundation considered contributing money to the Millennium Villages Project: "[Sachs'] hypothesis was that these interventions would be so synergistic that they would start a virtuous upward cycle and lift the villages out of poverty for good."

The first Millennium village was launched in 2005 in Sauri, Kenya. "This is a village that’s going to make history," is how Sachs described Sauri in The Diary of Angelina Jolie and Dr. Jeffrey Sachs in Africa, a 2005 MTV documentary. "It’s a village that’s going to end extreme poverty."

After expanding to 10 sites across rural Africa, the Millennium Village Project ended with a disappointing final evaluation in 2015. While acknowledging in The Lancet that the MVP was not entirely successful ("the project achieved around a third of the MDG-related targets and fell short on two-thirds"), Sachs argued that “the lessons learned from the MVP are highly pertinent." By contrast, critics have stated that "there is little scientific evidence that the project attained its goals," pronouncing it "a waste of hundreds of millions of dollars."

When asked if she considered the MVP a failure, journalist Nina Munk, who spent six years reporting on the MVP for her book The Idealist, said: "Well, no, I don't consider it to be a failure, because many people's lives, I believe, have been improved by the project itself.... In village after village I saw children who suffered from less malnutrition, for example; fewer incidence of malaria, quite clearly. There was higher agricultural production. There was improved hygiene in certain cases. But it also began to fall apart very quickly as the budgets ran low. In-fighting began. It was quite clear to me that it was neither sustainable and nor was it scalable."

== Description ==
The project was divided into two phases, from 2004 to 2010 for the first phase and 2011-2015 for the second phase. In the first phase, the project was focused at the following five stations: agriculture (seed and fertilizer support, farmer training and storage expansion, crop diversification, etc.), health (installation of mosquito nets, vaccine supply and pest control, etc.), education (Construction of schools, installation of water supply, etc.), infrastructure (sanitation, roads, etc.), business development (micro-credit, cooperative training, etc.). The main focus in the second phase of the MVP was to successfully enhance, strengthen, and complete the programs that started in Phase 1.

By improving access to clean water, primary education, basic health care, sanitation, and other science-based interventions such as improved seeds and fertilizer, Millennium Villages aimed to ensure that communities living in extreme poverty have a real, sustainable opportunity to lift themselves out of the poverty trap.

Millennium Villages are divided into different types. There are the original core villages which include different agro-ecological zones covering 14 sites in 10 countries in sub-Saharan Africa, including: Sauri and Dertu, Kenya; Koraro, Ethiopia; Mbola, Tanzania; Ruhiira, Uganda; Mayange, Rwanda; Mwandama and Gumulira, Malawi; Pampaida and Ikaram, Nigeria; Potou, Senegal; Tiby and Toya, Mali and Bonsaaso, Ghana.

There are additional Millennium Villages which are following the Millennium Village program but which are not directly supported through The Earth Institute at Columbia University. These additional villages are located in Liberia, Cambodia, Jordan, Mozambique, Haiti, Cameroon and Benin.

The project was originally funded through a combination of World Bank loans and private contributions, including $50 million from George Soros. Initially designed with a timeline of five years, the project was extended to ten years to allow more time to reach the intended goals. In her 2013 book about the project, The Idealist: Jeffrey Sachs and the Quest to End Poverty, journalist Nina Munk quotes Sachs saying: "The main thing is to add another block of time to really get the income levels significantly raised."

== Expansion ==
In 2012, the UK's Department for International Development (DfID) committed $18.1m (£11.5m) over five years to fund a new Millennium Village in Ghana.

On 13 August 2013, the Islamic Development Bank and the Earth Institute at Columbia University announced the expansion of an earlier partnership to work with African nations to support their efforts to end extreme poverty. Part of that partnership involved the Islamic Development Bank providing $104 million in interest-free loans to 8 countries towards ending extreme poverty, improving public health, and achieve more sustainable development. Of that sum, $29 million was to be used to scale-ups of the Millennium Villages Project in Mali, Senegal and Uganda.

In July 2013, the Ugandan government announced it would scale up the Millennium Villages Project in the original region around the Ruhiira Millennium Village through $US 9.75 million of funding from the Islamic Development Bank. However, the promised scale-up has not yet taken place.

In September 2013, the Rwandan government and the Millennium Villages Project announced a partnership to scale-up certain aspects of the Millennium Village approach, as part of Rwanda's Vision 2020 Umurenge Programme which addresses poverty nationwide.

The Millennium Villages Project has provided lessons and techniques for Nigeria's development programs designed to achieve the Millennium Development Goals.

== Guiding principles ==
- Promote sustainable, scalable, community-led progress toward the achievement of the Millennium Development Goals through the use of scientifically validated interventions—one village at a time
- Ensure African ownership of the Millennium Development Goals, and work in partnership with African governments and regional groups
- Increase capacity and community empowerment in Africa through training and knowledge sharing with local African governments, NGOs, and village communities.
- Partner with the public and private sectors, innovative NGOs, universities and leading experts, and the international donor community throughout Africa and the world to continually improve and coordinate development strategies.
- Transform rural sub-subsistence farming economies into small-scale enterprise development economies and promote diversified entrepreneurs

== Financing ==
The Government of Japan (through its Human Security Trust Fund) and private philanthropic donors (through the Earth Institute at Columbia University) provided the financing for the first set of Millennium Villages, reaching some 60,000 people.

A core aspect of the Millennium Villages is that the poverty-ending investments in agriculture, health, education, and infrastructure can be financed by donors at an incremental cost of just $60 per villager per year—$250,000 per village per year. The overhead costs of managing the project in each village is $50,000 per year.

On a per-person basis, the total village cost of $120 per person includes:

- $60 Donor funding through the Millennium Village program
- $30 Local and national governments (this is most likely to include funding for interventions themselves and the provision of agricultural and health extension workers in the villages)
- $20 Partner organizations (e.g., existing programs supported by official bilateral donors) and in-kind corporate giving (for example, Sumitomo Chemical Corporation recently agreed to donate insecticide-treated bednets for the Millennium Villages)
- $10 Village members, typically through in-kind contributions of their time and expertise

Critically, the external financing needs of $70 per capita are in line with the financial commitments made by the leaders of industrialized countries at the 2005 Summit in Gleneagles. G8 countries promised to raise their development assistance to Africa to the equivalent of $70 per capita by 2010.

== Prospects for increasing village-based interventions ==
In a review of the project undertaken by the Overseas Development Institute (ODI) crop yield increases of 85-350% were recorded as well as reductions in malaria incidence of over 50%. While agricultural surpluses are able to be channelled into school meals programmes, helping to increase enrolment, improvements in health status are reported to increase labour productivity.

According to ODI policy conclusions, in order for wider scale, more sustainable implementation to be achieved, village projects need to identify shared goals, seeking evidence-based, cost-effective interventions by governments and implementing agencies. They will also need to focus on addressing upstream investments such as training facilities for front-line staff.

== Critics ==
When compared to the Ekwendeni village of the Soils, Food and Healthy Communities (SFHC), the Millennium Villages obtain only similar achievements at far greater expense. This is a result of the Millennium Villages' use of artificial fertilizers and hybrids seeds (often of plants such as corn, which are not indigenous to the area). SFHC, on the other hand, uses diverse legume crops to improve soil health: "The SFHC research project attempts to improve child nutritional status, household food security and soil fertility through use of different legume options which can improve the quality and quantity of food available within the household as well as provide organic inputs to improve soil fertility."

According to Rachel Bezner Kerr, the use of fertilizers and genetically modified seeds can lead to dependence of the farmers on expensive products being marketed by large industrial companies. By contrast, the use of crop diversity to improve soil health is a low cost, and thus far more sustainable, solution. Note this comparison is only to one component of the Millennium Villages Project which works in many different sectors including agriculture, education, health, infrastructure and business development.

Journalist Nina Munk followed the progress of a group of Millennium Villages for several years, and in her 2013 book The Idealist: Jeffrey Sachs and the Quest to End Poverty, argued that a basic flaw of the Millennium Villages program was that it was developed by Western academics who were disconnected from rural Africa and failed to understand African practices and cultures. She cited such examples as promoting growing maize among people who had not historically eaten it or building a short-lived livestock market when there was no local demand.

== Evaluations ==
A rigorous evaluation of the MVP is considered impossible due to shortcomings in the project's evaluation design, including the "subjective choice of intervention sites, the subjective choice of comparison sites, the lack of baseline data on comparison sites, the small sample size, and the short time horizon". A self-published assessment comparing villages three years into the project to how they were initially estimated large impacts on health, agricultural yield, and a variety of other measures. As some of this may have been due to regional improvements unrelated to the MVP, an independent evaluation comparing the MV to surrounding areas finds the effects are much more modest. An additional independent evaluation found that while agricultural productivity increased, final household income was not increased by the MVP.

In 2012, the MVP published an assessment in the Lancet showing "reductions in poverty, food insecurity, stunting, and malaria parasitaemia". Objections were raised to some of these conclusions, and the authors later issued corrections : calculations of the under-5 child mortality rate were flawed and withdrawn as the rate appears to have improved less in the MVP sites than in the surrounding regions.

== See also ==
- Millennium Communities Programme
- Jeffrey Sachs
- Pedro Sanchez
