= Geological Survey of Tanzania =

Scientific agency of the Tanzanian government

Geological Survey of Tanzania (TGS)
Agency overview
- Formed: 26 June 2006; 20 years ago (Geological Survey)
- Jurisdiction: Tanzania
- Headquarters: Dodoma; Dodoma Region; Tanzania
- Employees: 145
- Agency executive: Mussa Daniel Budeba, Chief Executive Officer
- Website: GST

The Geological Survey of Tanzania or GST (Swahili: Uchiunguzi wa Jiolojia wa Tanzania) is a scientific department under the Tanzanian government. The scientists of the GST investigate the landscape of Tanzania, as well as its natural resources and potential hazards. The work of the organization is interdisciplinary and includes biology, geography, geology, and hydrology. The GST is a fact-finding scientific group without that works with the Ministry of Minerals. In 1925 the agency was established under the British colonial government. Mussa Daniel Budeba, a geologist, is the organization's current chief executive officer.

In accordance with The Executive Agency Act No. 30, [CAP 245] of 1997, establishment order, 2005, Government notice no: 418 released on 9/12/2005, the Geological Survey of Tanzania (GST) was created as a Government Executive Agency in October 2005. Through the Written Laws (Miscellaneous Amendments) Act, No. 7 of 2017, the Tanzanian government revised the Mining Act of 2010 in July 2017. In addition to the various GST functions outlined in the Mining Act of 2010, new ones were added by the modification.

== Departments ==
The organization is divided into four divisions: National Geoscientific and Minerals Database Directorate, the Laboratory Services and Export Permit Directorate, the Geology Services Directorate and the Business Support Services Directorate, and the chief executive officer (CEO) works together to manage the GST. There are ten Section Managers who support the Directors.

The Internal Audit, Information, Procurement, Management, and Legal Services Units all report directly to the CEO in accordance with the current government procedures. Additionally, a Board oversees GST performance and issues instructions and recommendations as necessary. GST now employs 145 people, of whom professionals and technicians with a variety of geoscientific specializations in the earth sciences make up 66% of the workforce. To carry out its tasks, GST now has a solid human resource foundation.

== History ==
The organization was established in 1925 by the British Overseas Management Authority (BOMA) administration under the name of Geological Survey Department (GSD) as an independent governmental department. The primary objective was to speed up the development of mineral resources of the Tanganyika Territory. In April 1926, the headquarters of GSD was set up in Dodoma by the first director, Dr. E.O.Teale. The main assignment of the GSD was to provide geological information acquired through geological mapping and reconnaissance mineral exploration in the country as well as prospecting for groundwater resources. The Minerals Laboratory was established in 1929 to support the geological mapping and mineral exploration.

Since its establishment, the Survey has undergone various re-organizational administrative changes under different Ministries including Ministry of Mines and Commerce (1935 to 1949), Ministry of Commerce and Industry (1960 to 1961), Ministry of Industries, Mineral Resources and Power (1964 to 1966), Ministry of Water, Power and Mineral Resources (1978 to1981), Ministry of Minerals (1981 to 1984), Ministry of Energy and Minerals (1986 to 1990), Ministry of Water, Energy and Minerals (1991 to 1996), Ministry of Energy and Minerals (1996 to7th October 2017) and Ministry of Minerals since October 2017 to present. Rumisha Kimambo became the first Tanzanian geologist to work for the Tanzanian government in 1965 at the Department of Mineral Resources, as it was called then.

== Achievements ==
Since the Geological Survey was founded around 80 years ago, it has accomplished a number of noteworthy things. The accomplishments comprise: 94% of the country has been geologically mapped, and quarter-degree sheets (QDS), which are published geological maps, are accessible at several scales. A large number of mineral occurrences were discovered, some of which became top-tier mines (such Kahama and Geita Gold Mines). The Mineral Sector's increased GDP contributions rose from 0.3% in the 1980s to 4.3% at the turn of the century. The government made several modifications to its economic policies in the late 1980s and early 1990s, which helped to foster growth.

Low-resolution aerial geophysical data at 1 km line spacing and 120 m ground clearance are available for the entire nation. High-resolution aerial geophysical data covering 16% of the whole nation (200–250 m line spacing and 45–70 m ground clearance) is available. Geochemical data are available for 19% of the country at various sampling densities and media. Modern lab equipment is accessible for chemical, mineralogical, geotechnical, and mineral processing laboratories availability of cutting-edge and dependable ICT infrastructure (speed internet, intranet, large storage servers, e-mail, public database web portal, website, fax, etc.). GMIS, or the Geological and Mineral Information System, is a centralized, standardized database management system and is available to the public.

There is availability of a current national database of mineral occurrences and the geological metadata it is associated with, which encourages additional investment and thereby expands the market and programs for GST. Rock library, existence core, and geological museum have been established. The agency is currently in possession of current field geological gear and equipment, including trucks, tents, generators, GPS, durable books, and archives with a wide range of geoscientific data (geotechnical reports, geological, geophysical, and geochemical data in digital and hard copies).
