= Ugalla River National Park =

Protected area in Tanzania

- IUCN category II (national park)
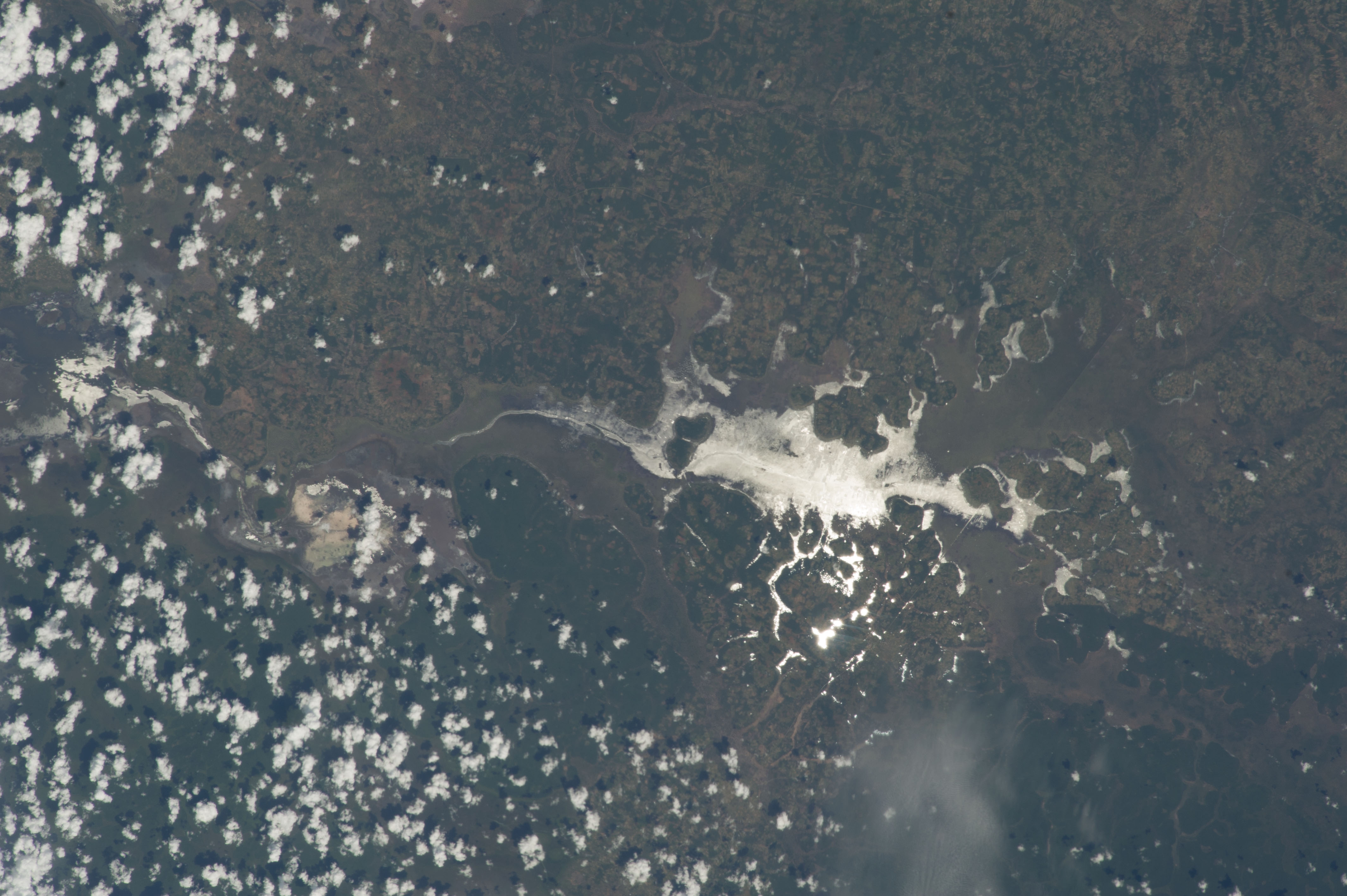
- Satellite view of Ugalla River system taken from ISS

- Location within Tanzania
- Location: Tabora Region; Tanzania
- Nearest city: Mpanda
- Coordinates: 5°48′37.3″S 31°54′6.5″E
- Area: 3,865 km^{2} (1,492 mi^{2})
- Designation: National Park
- Established: 2019
- Named for: Ugalla River
- Governing body: Tanzania National Parks Authority under the Ministry of Natural Resources and Tourism
- Website: Official Page

The Ugalla River National Park (Hifadhi ya Taifa ya Mto Ugalla, In Swahili) is a Tanzanian national park in Tabora Region, of west-central Tanzania. The park covers 3,865 square kilometres (1,492.28 sq mi). It is bounded on the south by the Ugalla River.

== Etymology ==
The Ugalla River, which during the dry season is the only source of permanent water for wildlife, inspired the park's name. The river gently meanders westward outside of the national park's boundaries into the intricate network of marshes and rivers known as the Moyowosi Swamps, which finally empty into Lake Tanganyika.

== History and attractions ==
The National Park was established in 2019 after the Tanzanian parliament separated part of the Ugalla River Game reserve to form a national park. It is located in the central-western part of Tanzania, in the eastern part of Lake Tanganyika.

The whole area is a spacious landscape dominated by Miombo forests and high grassy savannas inhabited by buffaloes, elephants, leopards, giraffes, zebras, etc. The average amount of rainfall is 600–750 mm per annum.
