= Bonsaaso =

Bonsaaso Bonsaiso
- Village
- Location within Ghana
- Coordinates: 6°14′07″N 1°59′53″W
- Country: Ghana
- Region: Ashanti Region
- District: Amansie South District
- Time zone: GMT
  - Summer (DST): GMT

Bonsaaso is a village in the Amansie South District in the Ashanti Region of Ghana. It is the only village in Ghana to benefit from the Millennium Villages Project.

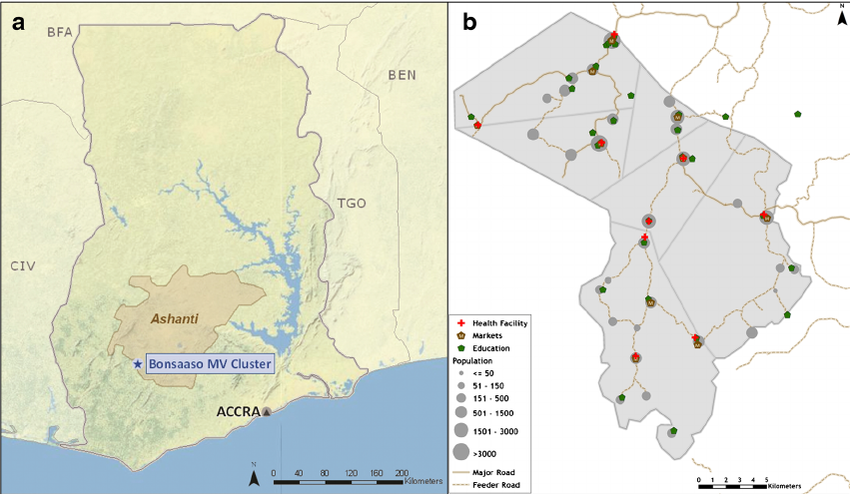
Map showing location of Bonsaaso
