= Igunga District =

Coordinates: 4°20′S 33°45′E

- District
- Country: Tanzania
- Region: Tabora Region

Area
  - Total: 7,064 km^{2} (2,727 sq mi)

Population (2022)
  - Total: 546,204
  - Density: 77.32/km^{2} (200.3/sq mi)

Igunga is one of the seven districts of the Tabora Region of Tanzania. It is bordered to the north by the Shinyanga Region, to the east by the Singida Region, to the south by the Uyui District and to the west by the Nzega District. Its administrative seat is the town of Igunga. Igunga is now divided into two constituencies: Igunga constituency and Manonga constituency, whereby Manonga town is Choma Chankola. Igunga is the second district in production

According to the 2002 Tanzania National Census, the population of the Igunga District was 325,547. .

According to the 2012 Tanzania National Census, the population of Igunga District was 399,727.

According to the 2022 Tanzania National Census, the population of Igunga District was 546,204 in 2022.

== Transport ==
Paved Trunk road T3 from Morogoro to Rwanda passes through the district from east to west.

== Administrative subdivisions ==
As of 2012, Igunga District was administratively divided into 35 wards.

=== Wards ===
- Igunga
- Bukoko
- Mtunguru
- Nanga
- Itumba
- Nguvumoja
- Mbutu
- Isakamaliwa
- Igurubi
- Kinungu
- Itunduru
- Kining'inila
- Mwamashiga
- Mwamashimba
- Mwamakona
- Choma Chankola
- Ngulu
- Ntobo
- Mwashiku
- Ziba
- Ibologero
- Nyandekwa
- Kitangiri
- Ndembezi
- Nkinga
- Ugaka
- Simbo
- Mwisi
- Chabutwa
- Sungwisi
- Kambi ya chupa
- Mwamala
- Uswaya
- Tambarale
- Igoweko

== Sources ==
- Igunga District Homepage for the 2002 Tanzania National Census
