= Tabora =

Capital city of Tabora Region, Tanzania

- City of Tabora Region
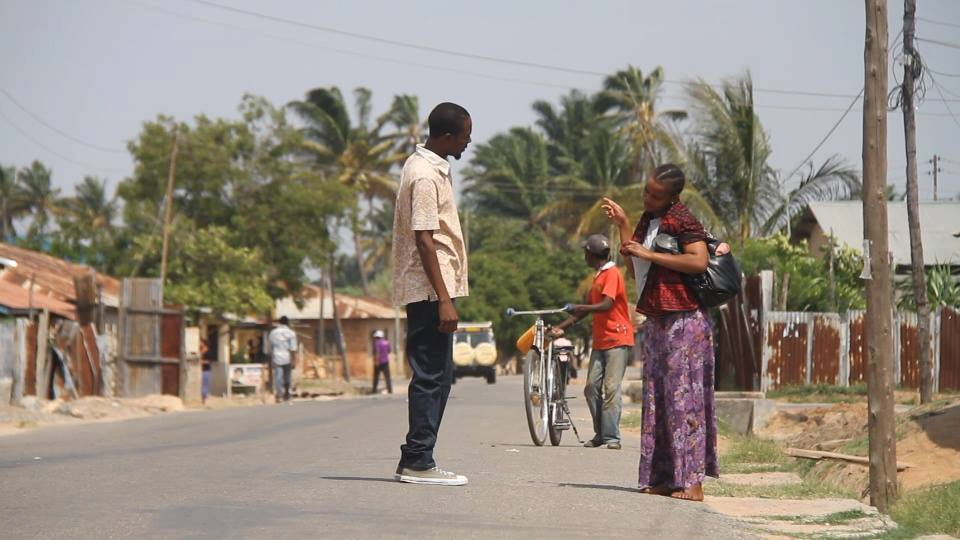
- Street scene in Tabora

- Location of Tabora.
- Coordinates: 5°1′S 32°48′E
- Country: Tanzania
- Region: Tabora Region
- District: Tabora Urban District

Area
  - City of Tabora Region: 564 sq mi (1,461 km^{2})

Population (2022 census)
  - City of Tabora Region: 308,741
  - Density: 547.3/sq mi (211.3/km^{2})
  - Urban: 221,466
- Time zone: UTC+3 (EAT)
  - Summer (DST): EAT
- Area code: 026
- Climate: Aw
- Website: Regional website

Tabora is the capital of Tanzania's Tabora Region and is classified as a municipality by the Tanzanian government. It is also the administrative seat of Tabora Urban District. According to the 2012 census, the district had a population of 226,999.

== History ==
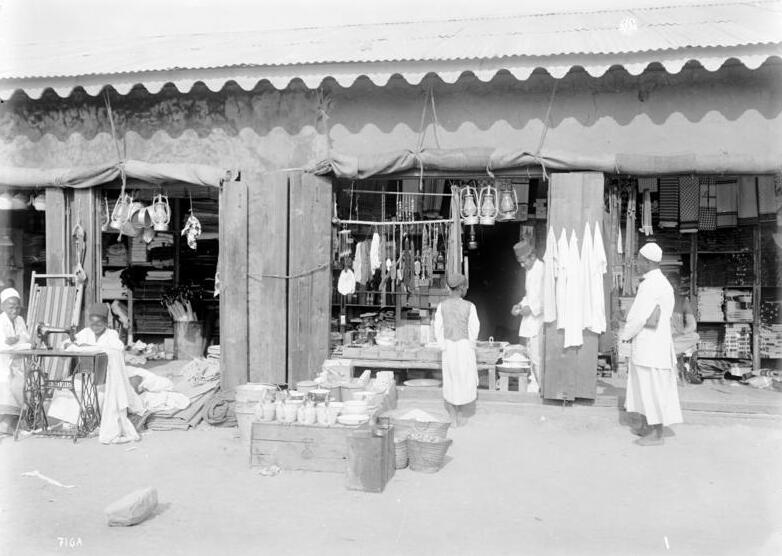
Indian shops in the year 1906 during the day time.

In the early 1830s, coastal traders increasingly settled in the region to take advantage of the ivory and slave caravan trade. Swahili and Omani traders established Kazeh, near present-day Tabora, in the 1850s. By 1870, Tabora was home to a population of 5,000-10,000 people living in roughly fifty large square houses. These homes accommodated up to several hundred people each and had inner courtyards, adjacent garden plots, store rooms, servant quarters, and outbuildings for slaves.

The town was surrounded by Nyamwezi villages, whose people provided produce and caravan labor. In this period the Sultan of Zanzibar appointed a representative there. It was part of the Kingdom of Unyanyembe. Tabora was a center of trade for traders from as far North as the Buganda Kingdom. By August 1871, one-quarter of the town was burned when the forces of the Nyamwezi ruler Mirambo sacked it.

Although the German East Africa protectorate was proclaimed over the region in 1885, as late as 1891 travellers reported it to be a lawless town. The German colonial administration did not gain control of it until later that year. As a major station on the Central Line, it became the most important administrative centre of central German East Africa.

In 1916 the colonial garrison had an emergency mint at Tabora, making some gold pieces as well as large numbers of crude copper and brass German East African rupie minor coins, Mint marked with a "T".

During the Tabora Offensive in the East African Campaign of World War I, colonial armed forces of the Belgian Congo (Force Publique) under the command of General Charles Tombeur captured the town on 19 September 1916 after 10 days and nights of heavy fighting.

== Socio-economic situation ==
Tabora and its people mainly rely on agricultural activities as either sustenance farmers or small-scale tobacco farmers. Tabora also hosts a ballast quarry.

Water supply is managed by the Tabora Urban Water Supply and Sanitation Authority (Tuwasa), sourced from Igombe and Kazima Dams. The Igombe River is a tributary of the Malagarasi River and the Malagarasi-Muyovozi Wetlands.

== Food and culture ==
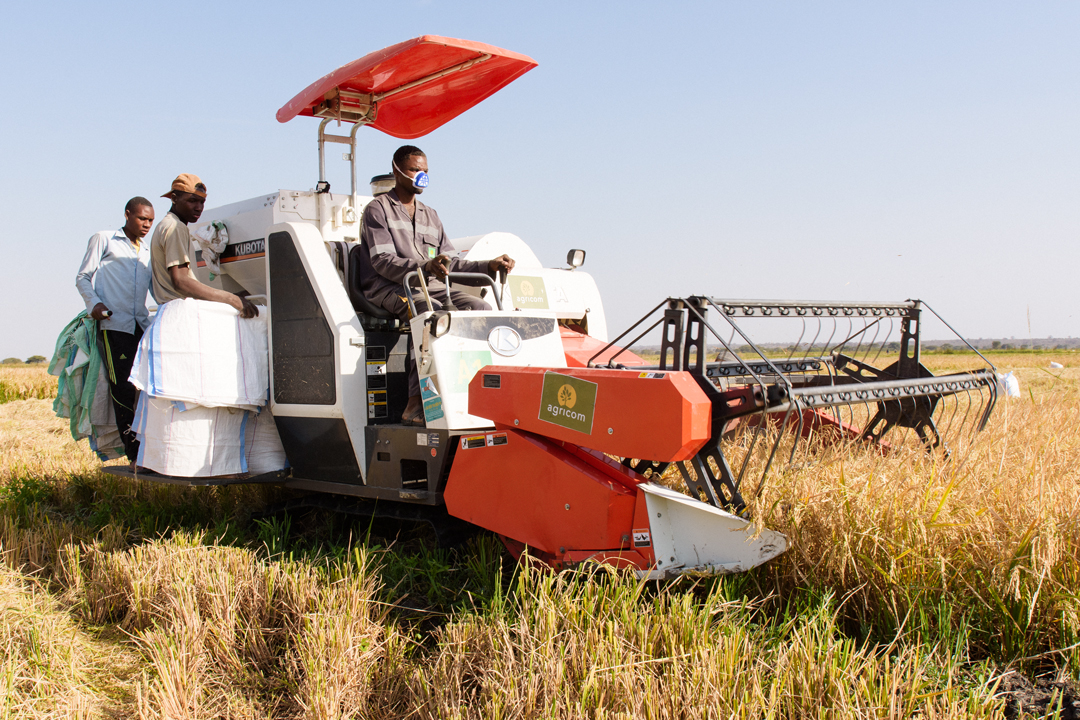
Rice harvest in Igunga, Tabora, Tanzania

Tabora's streets are lined with century-old mango trees planted by Omani traders. Tabora is known as the fruit capital of Western Tanzania, and markets are often filled with local produce.

Tabora has many small local restaurants offering typical Tanzanian restaurant food like Ugali (a thick maize porridge), chips, or rice with beans, beef or chicken. For breakfast or lunch, there is usually chipsi-mayai (chips and egg), which is basically a couple of eggs fried together with some chips. Although the food is bland, it is usually served with Tanzanian chili sauce, which gives the meal some character.

A local specialty is pumpkin in peanut butter sauce. This goes with the rice pilau served widely throughout the region.

For snacks there are local sambusa (samosa), some goat meat on a stick or some freshly roasted corn of the cob, all widely available in Tabora. There is a choice of fruit in the large regional market of Tabora, including pineapples, watermelons, and bananas.

== Climate ==
Tabora has a tropical savanna climate (Köppen Aw) with two seasons of approximately equal length. The wet season is from November to April and is followed by a dry season from May to October.

Climate data for Tabora (1991–2020)
Month	Jan	Feb	Mar	Apr	May	Jun	Jul	Aug	Sep	Oct	Nov	Dec	Year
Mean daily maximum °C (°F)	28.8 (83.8)	29.4 (84.9)	29.6 (85.3)	29.4 (84.9)	29.7 (85.5)	29.7 (85.5)	29.8 (85.6)	30.9 (87.6)	32.3 (90.1)	32.6 (90.7)	31.1 (88.0)	29.1 (84.4)	30.2 (86.4)
Daily mean °C (°F)	23.1 (73.6)	23.3 (73.9)	23.2 (73.8)	22.9 (73.2)	22.9 (73.2)	22.0 (71.6)	22.1 (71.8)	23.6 (74.5)	25.3 (77.5)	26.1 (79.0)	24.9 (76.8)	23.0 (73.4)	23.5 (74.4)
Mean daily minimum °C (°F)	18.3 (64.9)	18.0 (64.4)	17.9 (64.2)	17.6 (63.7)	16.5 (61.7)	14.7 (58.5)	14.6 (58.3)	16.5 (61.7)	18.3 (64.9)	19.4 (66.9)	19.1 (66.4)	18.6 (65.5)	17.5 (63.5)
Average precipitation mm (inches)	162.1 (6.38)	142.7 (5.62)	153.4 (6.04)	105.8 (4.17)	29.2 (1.15)	1.9 (0.07)	0.9 (0.04)	0.9 (0.04)	9.3 (0.37)	26.0 (1.02)	109.4 (4.31)	202.2 (7.96)	943.8 (37.16)
Average precipitation days (≥ 1.0 mm)	13.1	10.3	11.1	8.0	2.9	0.2	0.1	0.2	1.1	3.1	9.1	15.7	74.9
Source 1: NOAA
Source 2: Tokyo Climate Center (mean temperatures 1991–2020)

== Transport ==
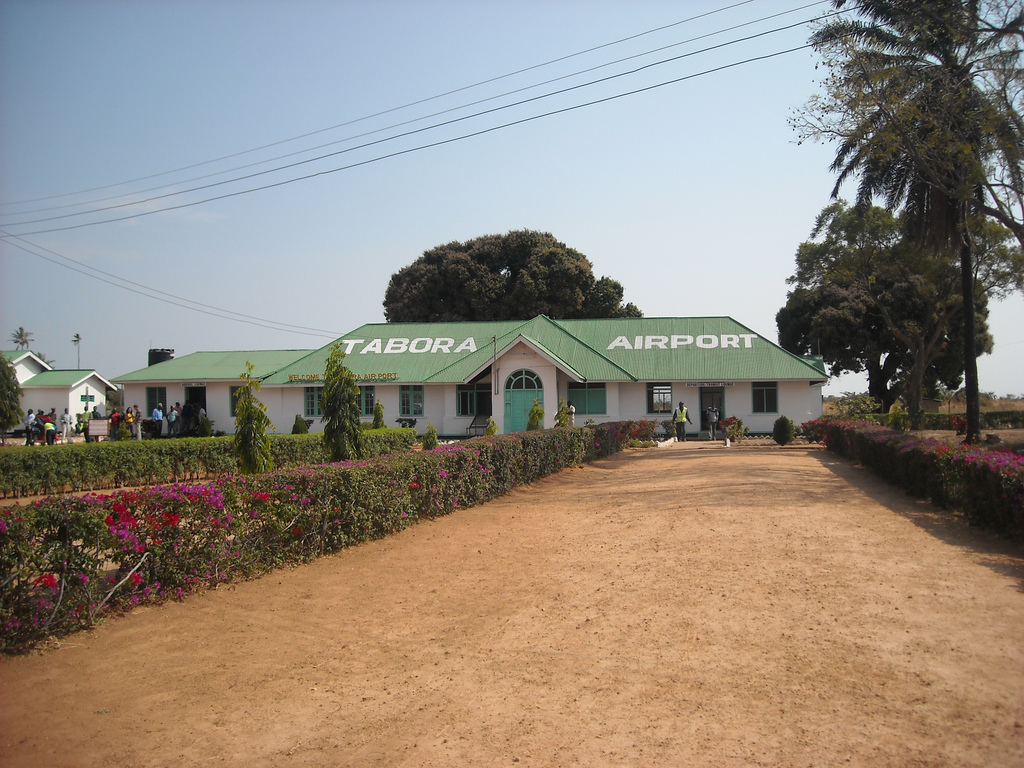
Tabora Airport

Tabora is small enough to walk from one side of town to the other. Bicycle taxis, motorbike taxis and regular taxis are available.

=== Road links ===
Tabora at the moment is served by mostly paved road T18 from Singida Region to Kigoma and partly unpaved road T8 from Mbeya to Mwanza passing through the district. Salt flats to the west prevent a direct road from connecting to Kigoma.

In January 2013, the Tanzanian government announced the commencement of work to upgrade to tarmac level the Tabora-Urambo road and the 127 kilometres (79 mi) Nyahua-Tabora-Ndono road. In December 2012, Prime Minister Mizengo Pinda stated the Tanzanian government's intent to upgrade the 359 kilometres (223 mi) Tabora-Inyonga-Mpanda road to tarmac level before 2015. In August 2011, Deputy Minister for Works Harrison Mwakyembe told the National Assembly that the government had begun to tarmac the 115 kilometres (71 mi) Tabora-Puge-Nzega road.

=== Railway links ===
Tabora is served and is a junction on the Central railway line, which goes east to Dar es Salaam, west to Kigoma on to the Lake Tanganyika and north to the port of Mwanza on Lake Victoria. Trains leave three times a week in any direction.

In 2017, a new station on the standard gauge railway is proposed.

=== Airport ===
Tabora is served by the Tabora Airport which is located 7 kilometres (4.3 miles) south of the centre of town. Renovation of the airport was completed in 2015.

Precision Air started flying to the airport three times a week on Monday, Wednesday and Friday, east from Julius Nyerere International Airport Dar es Salaam and west from Kigoma.

== Education ==
Tabora is home to a number of educational institutions, including:

=== Tabora Girls Secondary School ===
A public boarding school located in Tabora, Tanzania. It was established in 1928 by the British Colonial rulers. It is one of the oldest girls only school in Tanzania. The school was originally established to educate the daughters of local chiefs as prospective wives of other chiefs sons who were also educated around the same area at Tabora Boys Secondary School.

The school has produced students who were among the first women leaders in the country, such as Anna Abdallah one of the first woman district commissioners, Julie Manning the first woman to study law in Tanzania, Getrude Mongella the first President of the Pan-African Parliament.

=== Tabora Boys Secondary School ===
A public school in Tanzania founded in 1922. The school was established to educate sons of African Chiefs and wealthy tribesmen. The school first followed a tribal structure where students were assigned to dormitories based on their tribe, and received education on their respective tribal customs. In its early days the school was considered the 'Eton of Tanganyika'.

The first self-government cabinet in 1961 had eight ministers whose five were all from Tabora Boys.

Among the famous people who studied at this school are Rashidi Kawawa and the father of the Tanzanian nation, Mwalimu Julius Nyerere.

== See also ==
- Railway stations in Tanzania
- Tabora Deaf-Mute Institute
- Transport in Tanzania
