= Tabora Region =

Region of Tanzania

Tabora Region Mkoa wa Tabora (Swahili)
- Region
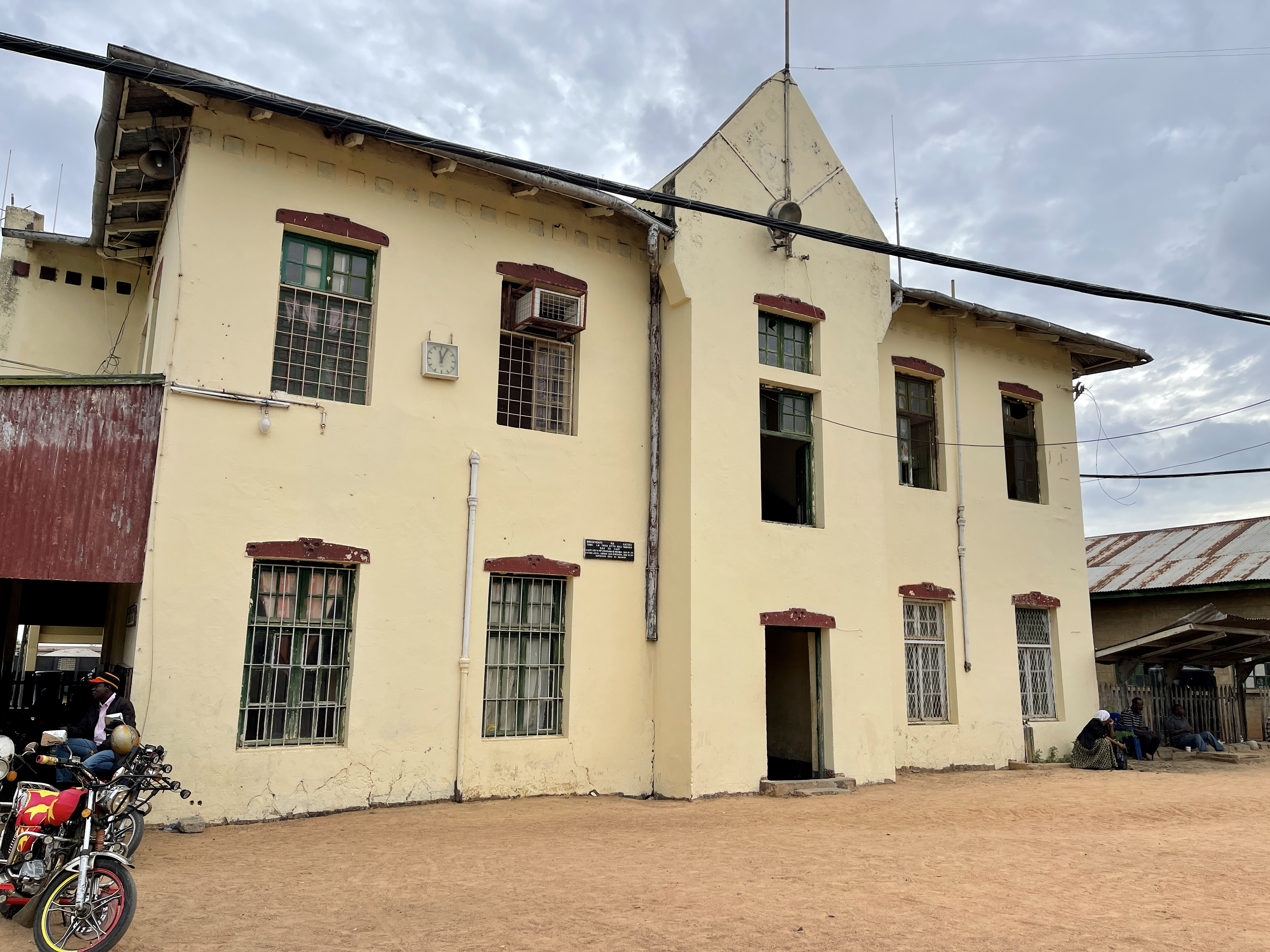
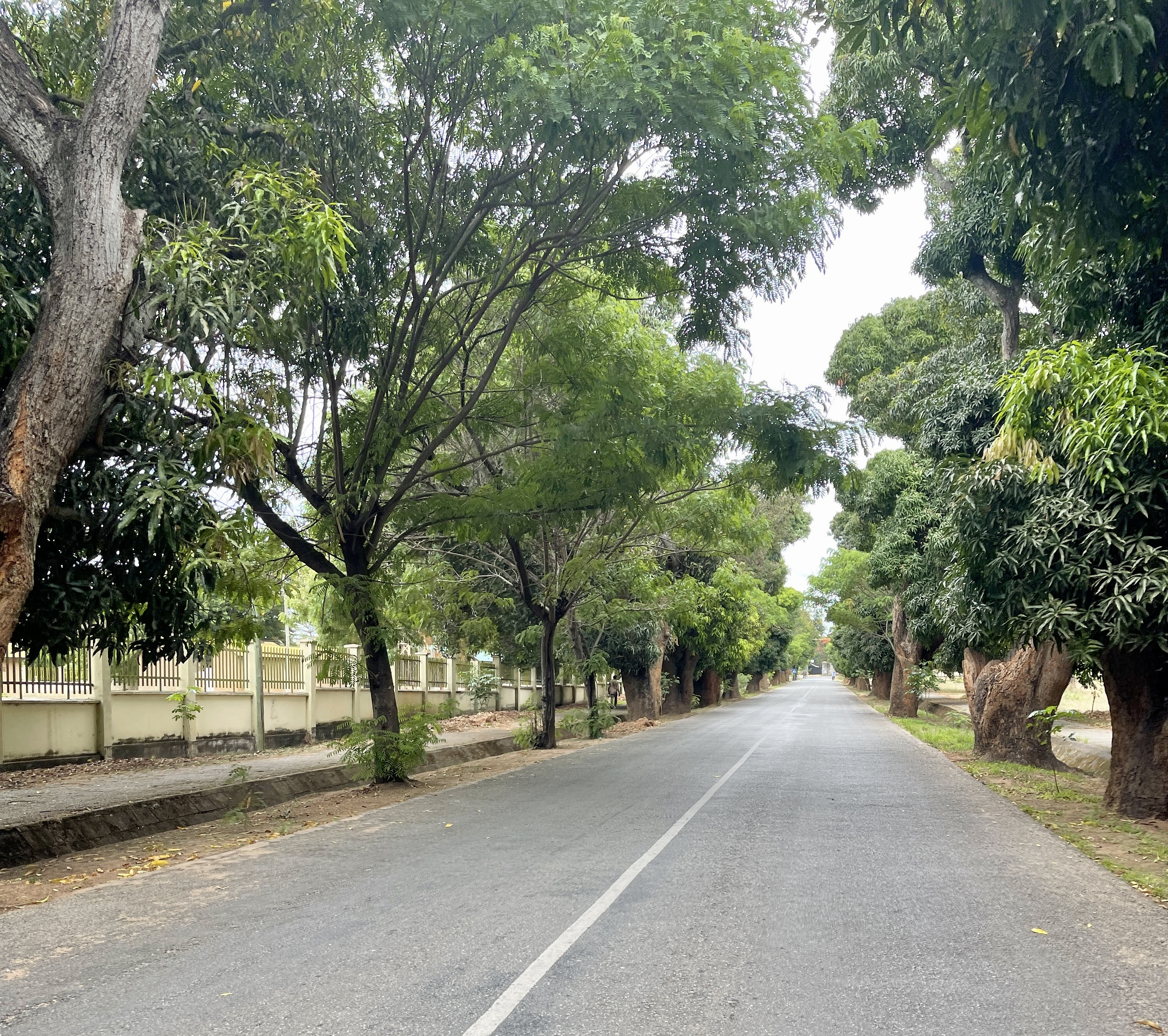
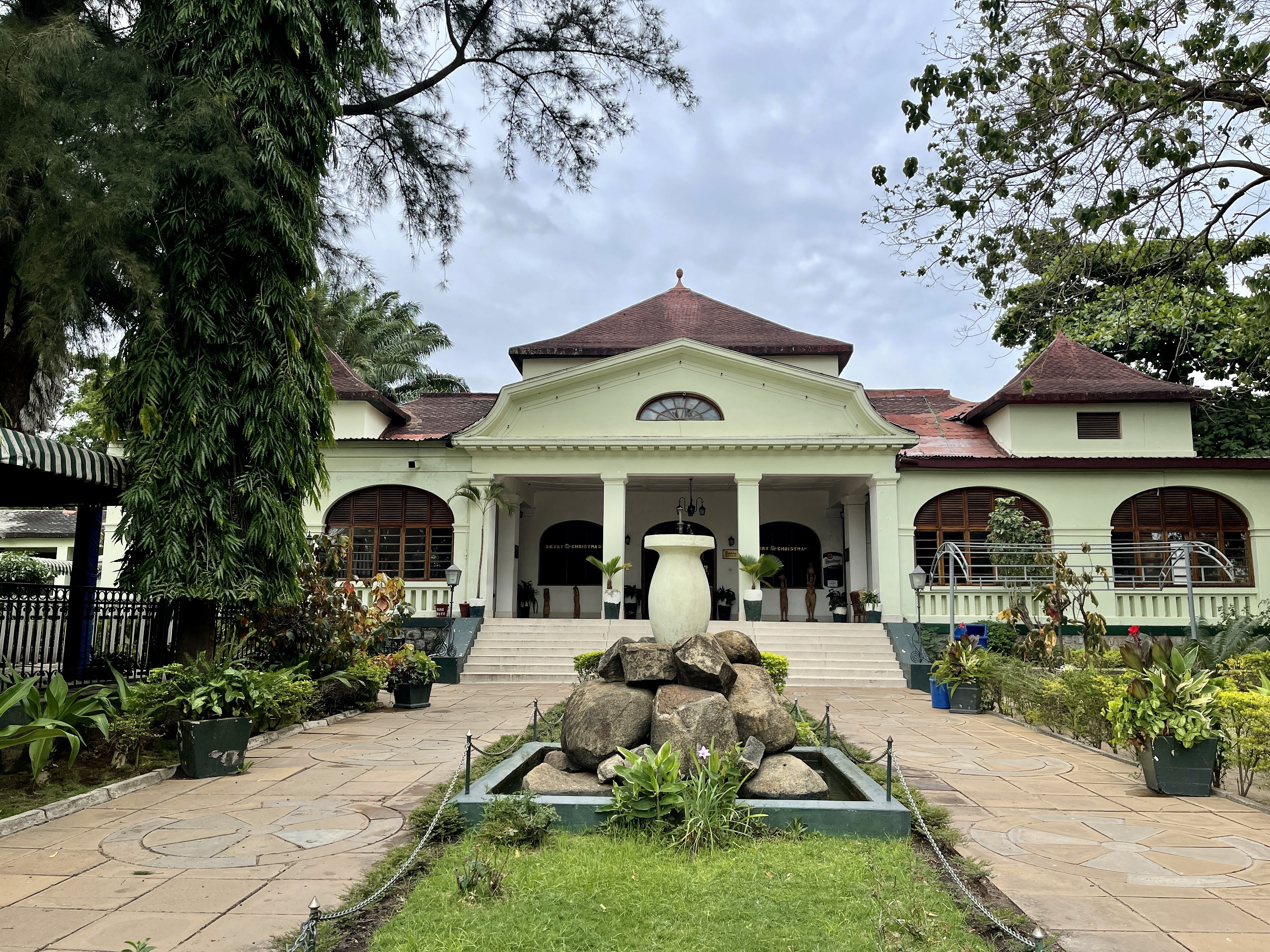
- From top to bottom: Tabora Railway Station, Avenue in Tabora and historic Tabora Hotel
- Etymology: Sweet potatoes
- Nickname: The Honey region
- Location in Tanzania
- Coordinates: 5°2′33″S 32°49′10.92″E
- Country: Tanzania
- Zone: Central
- Named for: The town of Tabora
- Capital: Tabora
- Districts: List: Igunga District; Kaliua District; Nzega District; Sikonge District; Tabora Municipal; Urambo District; Uyui District

Area
  - Total: 72,150 km^{2} (27,860 sq mi)
  - Rank: 1st
- Highest elevation (Mpunde): 1,627 m (5,338 ft)

Population (2022)
  - Total: 3,391,679
  - Rank: 3rd
  - Density: 47.01/km^{2} (121.8/sq mi)
- Demonym: Taboran

Ethnic groups
  - Settler: Swahili, Arabs
  - Native: Nyamwezi & Sukuma
- Time zone: UTC+3 (EAT)
- Postcode: 45xxx
- Area code: 026
- ISO 3166 code: TZ-24
- HDI (2018): 0.482 low · 25th of 25
- Website: Official website
- Symbols of Tanzania
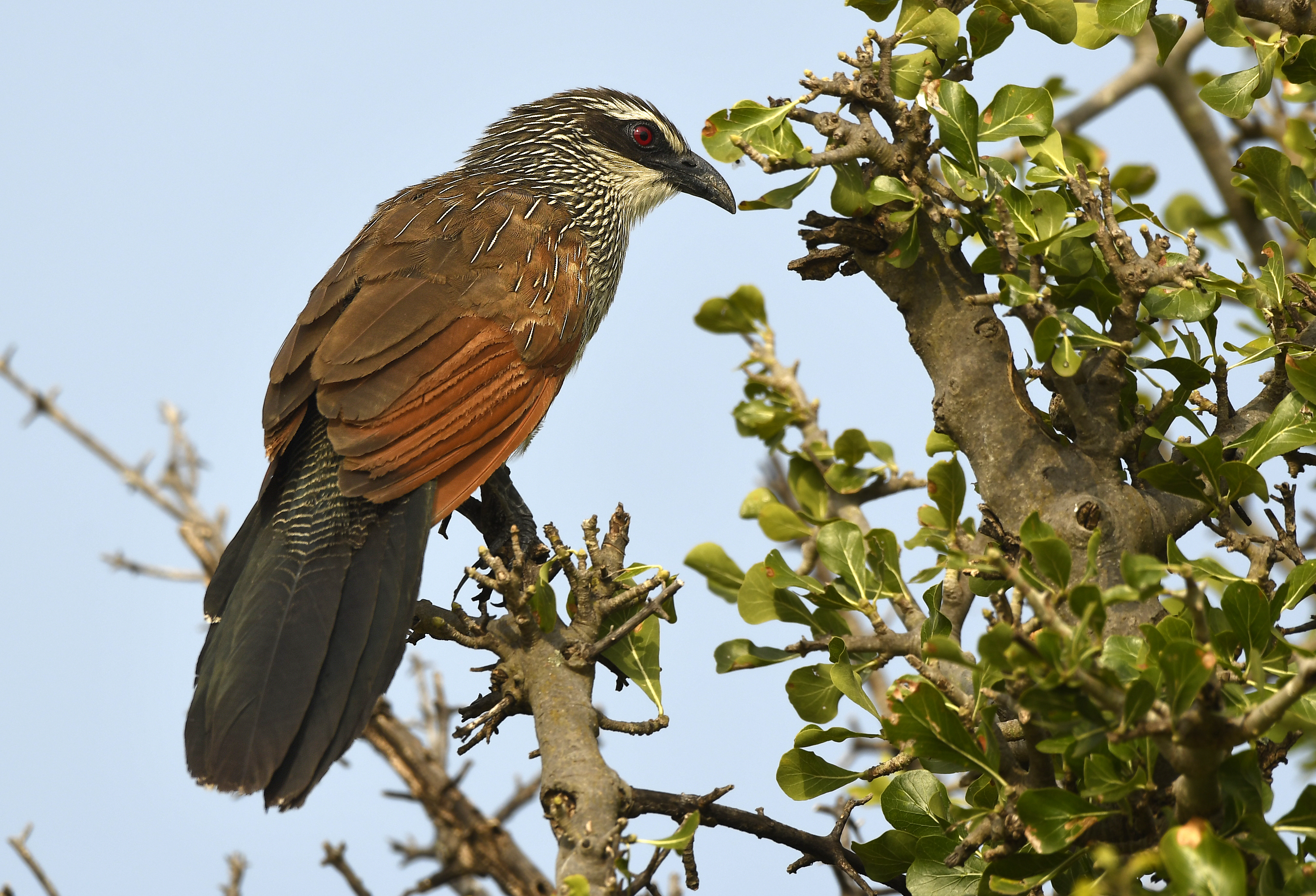
- Bird: White-browed Coucal

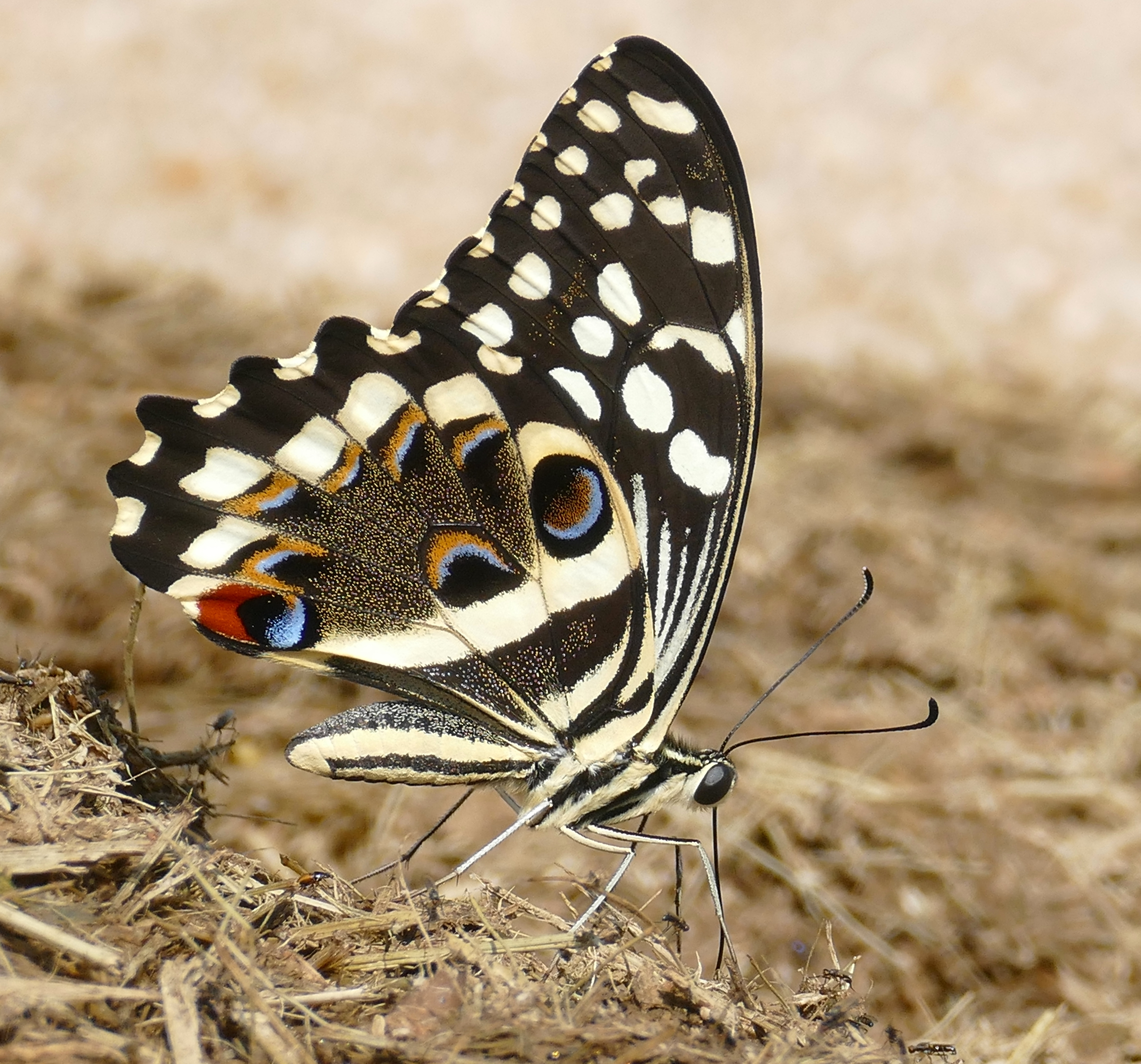
- Butterfly: Citrus Swallowtail
- Fish: Malagarasi sardine
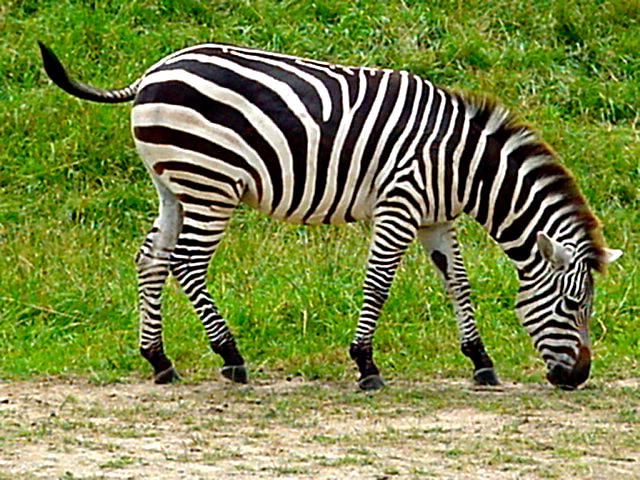
- Mammal: Zebra

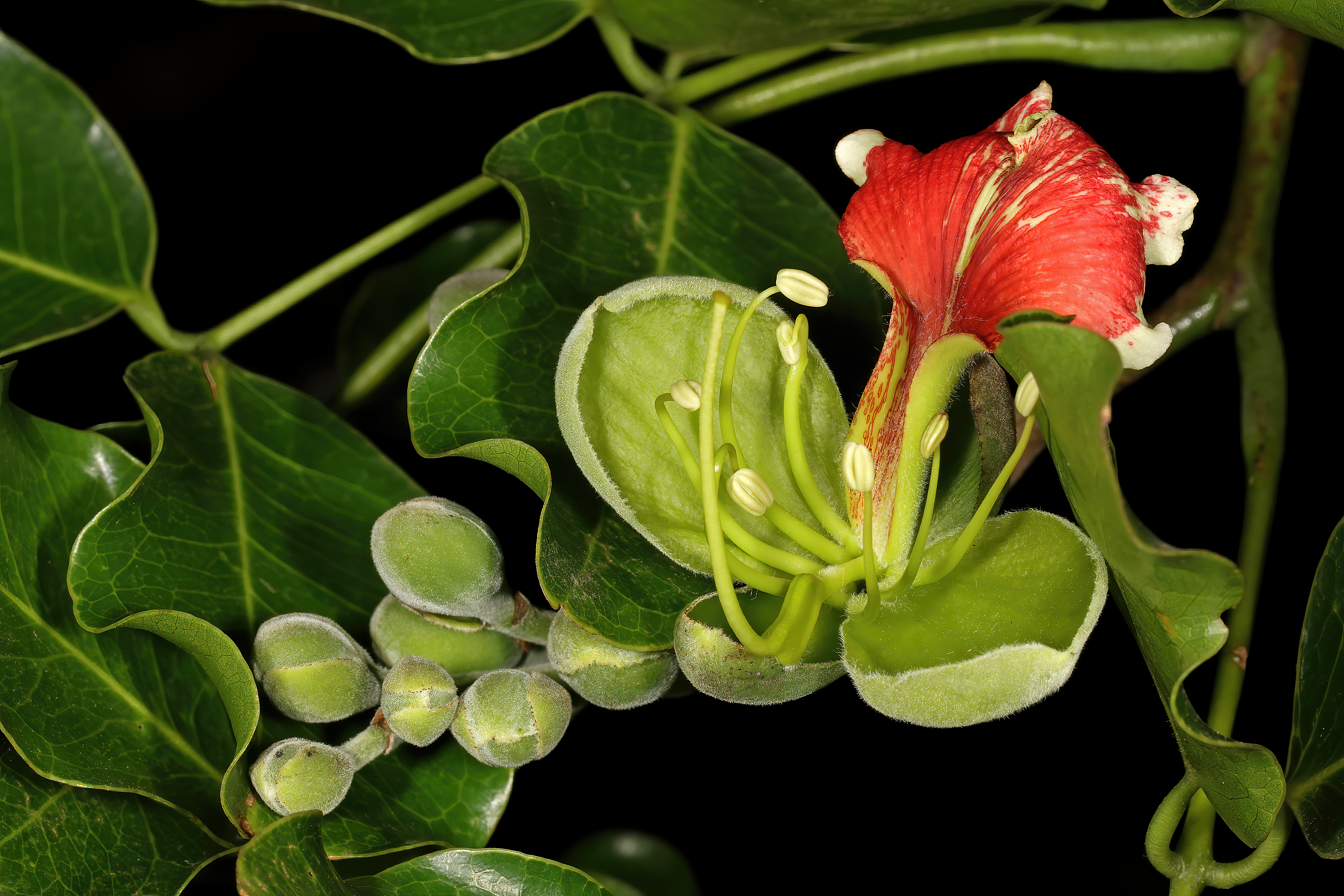
- Tree: Mahogany bean

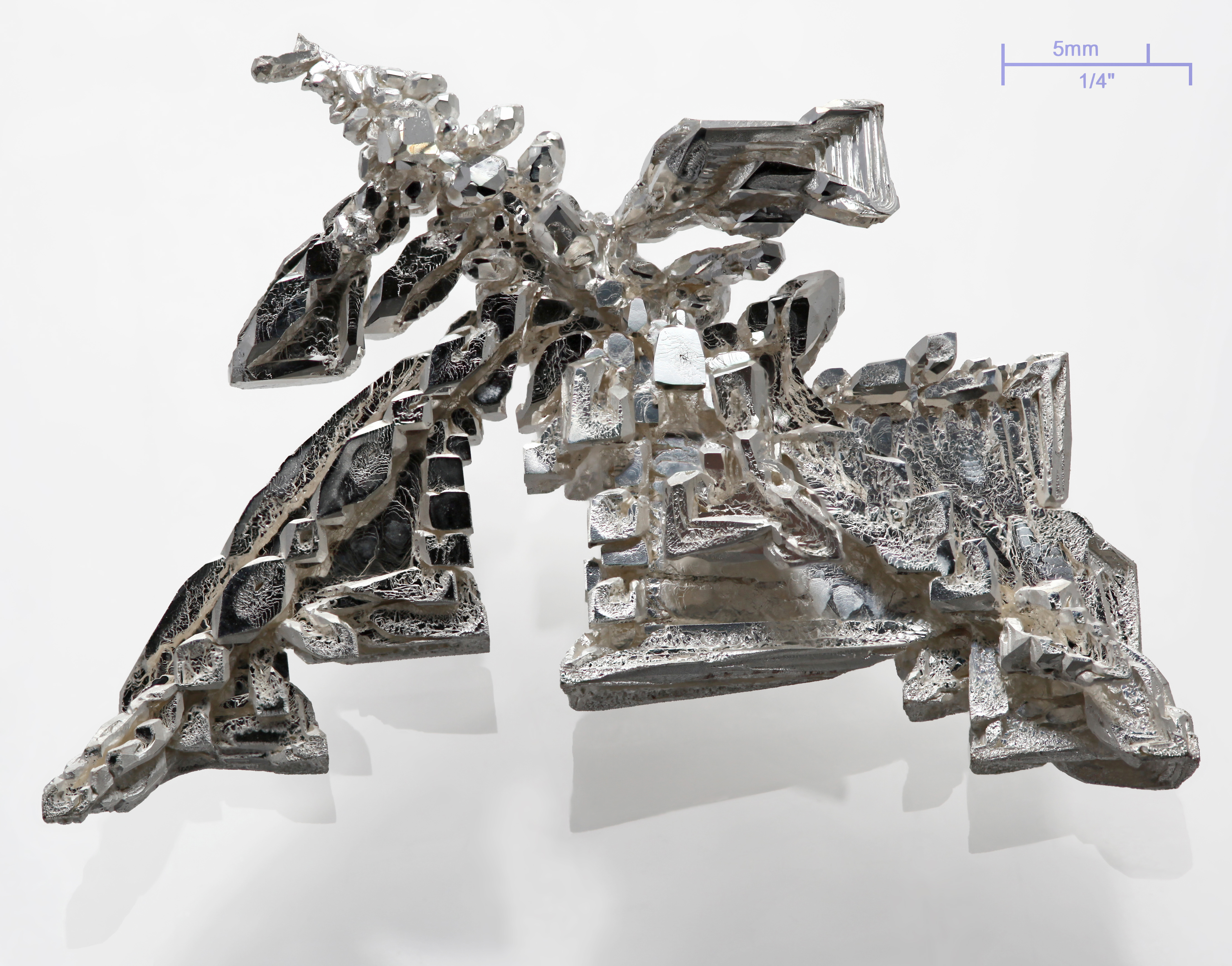
- Mineral: Silver

Tabora Region (Swahili: Mkoa wa Tabora) is one of Tanzania's 31 administrative regions located in mid-western part of Tanzania. The regional capital is the municipality of Tabora. Tabora is bordered by Shinyanga to the north, Singida to the east, Mbeya and Songwe to the south. lastly, Katavi, Kigoma and Geita, border Tabora to the west. Tabora is by far the largest region in Tanzania by area. Most of the population in the region is concentrated in the north in Nzega district. According to the 2022 national census, Tabora Region had a population of 3,391,679.

== Etymology ==
The name "Tabora" (Nyamwezi language: Matoborwa) meaning sweet potatoes, a common food ingredient among the Nyamwezi people. Foreigners corrupted the world " matoborwa" into Tobora and later turned it to Tabora, the name of the region today.

== Geography ==
=== Geology and terrain ===
Tabora Region is located on the central plateau of at the latitude between 4 and 7 degrees south of the equator, with majority of its land area lying between 1000m to 1500 m above sea-level. Tabora Region has an area of 76,151 square kilometres (29,402 sq mi), the region is slightly larger than the Central American country of Panama (75,417 square kilometres (29,119 sq mi)).

Tabora Region is in the central-western part of the country. The highest point in Tabora Region is Wumbo peak at 1395m located in eastern Sikonge District. The most prominent mountain is Mount Kizuge located in northern Tabora in Nzega District.

The longest river in Tabora Region is the Ugalla River which feeds in to the lake Tanganyika drainage basin. Other major rivers in Tabora territory are the Malagarasi River which forms the western border with Kigoma Region, in the north is the Wembere River and in the north is the Gombe River. Another prominent river is the Manonga River which drains east into lake Eyasi in Arusha Region. However, most of rivers in Tabora dry up during the dry season. The Malagarasi swamp is the largest Swamp in Tabora Region and one of the largest in Tanzania. Tabora borders a small eastern part of Lake Sagara.

=== Flora and fauna ===
Forest reserves cover 34,698 square kilometres (13,397 sq mi) (46% of the region), and game reserves cover 17,122 square kilometres (6,611 sq mi) (22% of the region). As of 2019, Two national Parks are now located in parts of Tabora Region. Ugalla River National Park is located in South western Tabora shared with northeast Katavi Region. Kigosi Game Reserve, which is officially a national park is located in north western Tabora, shared with southern Geita Region. The vegetation in Tabora is mostly Miombo woodland. however, there is a thick impenetrable shrub-land area in the northeast called the Itigi thicket. Tabora is home to birds like the White-browed coucal, which is also the regional bird.

=== Climate ===
Tabora Region has a tropical savanna climate with the Köppen climate classification of Aw. The total average annual precipitation in Western Tabora is 1010mm. While its 700mm or less in east Tabora towards the Singida border. The daily mean temperature is 23 degree Celsius.

== Demographics ==
=== Population ===
According to the 2012 national census, the region had a population of 2,291,623, which was lower than the pre-census projection of 2,539,715 . For 2002–2012, the region's 2.9 percent average annual population growth rate was the ninth-highest in the country. It was also the 24th-most-densely-populated region with 30 people per square kilometre. The region's average household size of 6.0 persons was the third-highest in the country.

| Census | Population |
|---|---|
| 1978 | 817,907 |
| 1988 | 1,036,150 |
| 2002 | 1,710,465 |
| 2012 | 2,291,623 |
| 2022 | 3,391,679 |

== Economy ==
Despite being the largest region in the country by area, Tabora Region was the 11th largest economy in Tanzania with a regional GDP of TSh 4.7 trillion in 2018, contributing 3.7% to the national economy. Tabora has a GDP per capita of US$2,185 (PPP), ranking 19/23 on the mainland.

=== Agriculture ===
Tabora Region's largest employer is agriculture at 64% of the economic activities in the region, mainly in commercial and food crops, together with livestock. Major crops grown in Tabora are maize, mainly for domestic consumption. Major cash crops are groundnuts, cassava, beans, tobacco, rice, sunflower oil and cotton. Cattle herding is not a major part of Tabora's economy, but a part of the resident's traditional lifestyle. Most of the cattle are the local Zebu breed, that is drought resistant and pest resistance compared to the imported European breeds in other regions. Lack of permanent rivers and lakes have further hindered the development of efficient agriculture in the region. However, Mwamapuli provides water for Igunga district and Igombe Dam provides water for Tabora City.

=== Forestry and honey production ===
Tabora is home to some of the largest miombo forests in Africa and the largest forest reserve in Tanzania. The region is one of the largest supplier of natural timber and the largest honey producer in Tanzania, producing 13,5000 tons in 2008. Tabora has a very productive bee keeping industry in the region, thus earning the nick name the honey region. Tabora produces half of all honey products in Tanzania. Tanzania is the second largest honey producer in Africa producing 27,000 tons in 2008, after Ethiopia which produces 44,000 Tons. Tabora produces unprocessed honey which is exported to Arusha City and Dar es Salaam City to be processed for export and domestic use. The Companies in Tabora honey production are Jempem Enterptises Ltd and Tabora Pure Honey.

== Government ==
As of 2021, the regional commissioner of Tabora is Batilda Buriani.

== Administrative divisions ==
=== Districts ===
Tabora Region is divided into seven districts, each administered by a council:

Districts of Tabora Region
| Map | District | Population (2012) | Population (2022) |
|---|---|---|---|
| | Igunga District | 399,727 | 546,204 |
| | Kaliua District | 393,358 | 678,447 |
| | Nzega District | 502,252 | 699,691 |
| | Sikonge District | 179,883 | 335,686 |
| | Tabora Municipal | 226,999 | 308,741 |
| | Urambo District | 192,781 | 260,322 |
| | Uyui District | 396,623 | 562,588 |
| | Total | 2,291,623 | 3,391,679 |

== Notable persons from Tabora Region ==
- Mirambo, Nyamwezi king
- Nyungu ya Mawe
- Msiri
- Grace Gobbo
- Hamisi Kigwangalla, Tanzanian politician
- Ibrahim Lipumba
- Edward Manyama
- Haruna Moshi
- Samuel Sitta, Tanzanian politician
