= Bitare (ward) =

Ward in Kibondo, Kigoma, Tanzania

Bitare Kata ya Bitare
- Ward
- Location within Tanzania Location within Africa
- Coordinates: 3.5526°S 30.7067°E
- Country: Tanzania
- Region: Kigoma Region
- District: Kibondo District
- Ward: Bitare

Government
  - MP: Atashasta Justus Nditiye
  - Chairman: Simon Kanguye Kagoli
  - Councilor: Julius Charles Kihuna

Population (2016)
  - Total: 11,553
- Time zone: UTC+3 (EAT)
- Postcode: 47202

Bitare, sometimes known as Kitale (Note: Bitare is the name used in official censuses and district planning/budgets. The Ki- and Bi- prefix is the same.) is an administrative ward within Muhambwe Constituency in Kibondo District of Kigoma Region in Tanzania. In 2016 the Tanzania National Bureau of Statistics report there were 11,553 people in the ward, from 10,496 in 2012.
