= Busunzu =

Ward in Kibondo, Kigoma, Tanzania

Busunzu Kata ya Busunzu
- Ward
- Location within Tanzania Location within Africa
- Coordinates: 3°56′S 30°34′E
- Country: Tanzania
- Region: Kigoma Region
- District: Buhigwe District
- Ward: Busunzu

Population (2016)
  - Total: 26,342
- Time zone: UTC+3 (EAT)
- Postcode: 47406

Busunzu is an administrative ward within Muhambwe Constituency in Kibondo District of Kigoma Region in Tanzania. In 2016 the Tanzania National Bureau of Statistics report there were 26,342 people in the ward, from 23,932 in 2012.

== Villages / neighborhoods ==
The ward has 2 villages and 19 hamlets.

- Busunzu
  - Kabegera
  - Kadida
  - Kazaroho
  - Kolimba
  - Mandela
  - Mbugani
  - Nyamuguruma A
  - Nyamuguruma B
  - Samora
- Nyakwi
  - Karume
  - Mandela
  - Mtakuja
  - Mtuntu
  - Nyarulanga
  - Nyerere
  - Samora
  - Sokoine
  - Songambele
  - Vumilia
