= Kagezi =

Ward in Kibondo, Kigoma, Tanzania

Kagezi Kata ya Kagezi
- Ward
- Location within Tanzania
- Coordinates: 3.788°S 30.499°E
- Country: Tanzania
- Region: Kigoma Region
- District: Kibondo District
- Ward: Kagezi
- Established: 2014

Government
  - MP: Atashasta Justus Nditiye
  - Chairman: Simon Kanguye Kagoli
  - Councilor: Saimon Kanguye Kagori

Population (2016)
  - Total: 9,375
- Time zone: UTC+3 (EAT)
- Postcode: 47410

Kagezi is an administrative Ward within Muhambwe Constituency in Kibondo District of Kigoma Region in Tanzania. In 2016 the Tanzania National Bureau of Statistics report there were 9,375 people in the ward.

Before 2014 Kagezi was a village in the Kumsenga Ward.

== Villages / neighborhoods ==
The ward has 10 hamlets.

- Bisako
- Kagezi
- Kigunga
- Maga
- Mikonko
- Mlange
- Ngoshi
- Nzizi
- Rungarunga
- Shuleni
