= Malagarasi Hydroelectric Power Station =

Hydroelectric power station in Tanzania

- Map of Tanzania showing the location of Malagarasi Hydroelectric Power Station
- Country: Tanzania
- Location: Igamba Falls, Malagarasi River, Kigoma Region
- Coordinates: 05°10′43″S 30°03′49″E
- Status: Proposed
- Owner: Tanesco

Dam and spillways
- Impounds: Malagarasi River

Reservoir
- Normal elevation: 1,200 m (3,900 ft)

Power Station
- Commission date: TBD
- Type: Run-of-the-river
- Installed capacity: 50 MW (67,000 hp)

Malagarasi Hydroelectric Power Station, is a planned 50 megawatts (67,000 hp) hydroelectric power station in Tanzania. The development is planned in the Igamba area, west of the Malagarasi swamps, at the site of the Igamba Falls.

== Location ==
The power station would be located on the Malagarasi River, west of the Malagarasi swamps, in the area called Igamba. This location is the location of the Igamba Falls, where the power station would be located. This location lies approximately 100 kilometres (62 mi), by road, southeast of the regional capital of Kigoma.

== Overview ==
Malagarasi Hydropower Station is intended to add 50 megawatts to the Tanzanian national electricity grid and to supply sustainable, renewable, green energy to the city of Kigoma and surrounding communities, including Uvinza, Kasulu and Buhigwe, which obtain their electricity from diesel sources. Any surplus electricity from this power station will be integrated into the national grid at an electric substation at Kidahwe, a suburb of Kigoma. A new 53 kilometres (33 mi) 132kV high voltage power line from the new power station to the substation at Kidahwe, is a component of this project.

According to the African Development Bank, the project has these additional benefits: 1. It will create approximately 700 jobs during the construction phase 2. It will reduce production costs of electricity in the Kigoma Region from US$0.33 to about US$0.04 per kilowatt-hour 3. It will reduce the use of fossil fuels and the attendant emission of greenhouse gases and 4. The cost of doing business is expected “to reduce because the industry will no longer need to maintain expensive back-up generators”.

== Construction costs and funding sources ==
As of November 2020, the total construction budget was US$144.14 million. The table below illustrates the sources of funding for the project. The loan documents were executed between the AfDB and the government of Tanzania, on 28 May 2021.

Malagarasi Hydroelectric Power Station Funding
Rank	Development Partner	US Dollars Invested	Percentage	Notes
1	African Development Bank	120.0 million	83.25	Loan
2	African Growth and Opportunity Fund	20.0 million	13.88	Loan
3	Government of Tanzania	4.14 million	2.87	Equity Investment
	Total	144.14 million	100.00	

== Technical consultant ==
Tanesco selected the Italian consulting engineering firm Studio Pietrangeli to oversee and supervise the technical aspects of the project, including review of the ESIA document, design of dam and powerhouse, design and supervision of tenders.

== See also ==
- Tanzania Power Stations
- Africa Dams
