= Kizazi =

Ward in Kibondo, Kigoma, Tanzania

Kizazi Kata ya Kizazi
- Ward
- Location within Tanzania
- Coordinates: 3.668°S 30.49°E
- Country: Tanzania
- Region: Kigoma Region
- District: Kibondo District
- Ward: Kizazi

Government
  - Type: Kibondo District Council
  - Leadership: Leader & Cabinet
  - MP: Atashasta Justus Nditiye
  - Chairman: Simon Kanguye Kagoli
  - Councilor: Mahori Bavuma Chiza

Population (2016)
  - Total: 19,520
- Time zone: UTC+3 (EAT)
- Postcode: 47409

Kizazi is an administrative ward within Muhambwe Constituency in Kibondo District of Kigoma Region in Tanzania. In 2016 the Tanzania National Bureau of Statistics report there were 19,520 people in the ward, from 17,734 in 2012.

== Villages / neighborhoods ==
The ward has 3 villages and 33 hamlets.

- Nyarugusu
  - Bugwana
  - Igambiliro
  - Kangeze
  - Kibhimba
  - Kizazi
  - Mutabo
  - Ngulilo
  - Rubali
  - Rusange
  - Samba
- Nyabitaka
  - Azimio
  - Ikaniko
  - Kasana
  - Kimanga
  - Majengo
  - Mshenyi
  - Mtakuja
  - Nchilakanyama
  - Nyabulimbi
  - Nyamayoka
- Kumshwabure
  - Kafwandi
  - Katovu
  - Kibimba
  - Kigarama
  - Kumshwabure
  - Kurusumu
  - Nyamigaye
  - Nyamikonko
  - Nyarugunga
  - Nyarunanga
