= Kumwambu =

Ward in Kibondo, Kigoma, Tanzania

Kumwambu Kata ya Kumwambu
- Ward
- Location within Tanzania
- Coordinates: 3.59298954°S 30.7146458°E
- Country: Tanzania
- Region: Kigoma Region
- District: Kibondo District
- Ward: Kumwambu

Government
  - Type: Kibondo District Council
  - Leadership: Leader & Cabinet
  - MP: Atashasta Justus Nditiye
  - Chairman: Simon Kanguye Kagoli
  - Councilor: Joyce Abinel Chuma

Population (2016)
  - Total: 6,689
- Time zone: UTC+3 (EAT)

Kumwambu is an administrative ward in Muhambwe Constituency in Kibondo District of Kigoma Region in Tanzania. In 2016 the Tanzania National Bureau of Statistics report there were 6,689 people in the ward.

== Villages / neighborhoods ==
The ward has 9 hamlets. Prior to 2014 Kumwambu was a village in the Kibondo Mjini ward.

- Kabwigwa
- Kibingo
- Kingoro
- Kumgarika
- Kumkenga
- Kumwambu
- Nakayuki
