= Busagara =

Ward in Kibondo, Kigoma, Tanzania

Busagara Kata ya Busagara
- Ward
- Location within Tanzania Location within Africa
- Coordinates: 3.8°S 30.6°E
- Country: Tanzania
- Region: Kigoma Region
- District: Buhigwe District
- Ward: Busagara

Government
  - MP: Atashasta Justus Nditiye
  - Chairman: Simon Kanguye Kagoli
  - Councilor: Michael Edwin Kapoli

Population (2016)
  - Total: 18,317
- Time zone: UTC+3 (EAT)
- Postcode: 47407

Busagara is an administrative ward in Muhambwe Constituency in Kibondo District of Kigoma Region in Tanzania. In 2016 the Tanzania National Bureau of Statistics report there were 18,317 people in the ward, from 30,722 in 2012.

== Villages / neighborhoods ==
The ward has 3 villages and 27 hamlets. Prior to 2014 Nyaruyoba was a village within the Busagara Ward.

- Kifura
  - Busagara A
  - Busagara B
  - Kasanda
  - Kibambo
  - Kihera A
  - Kihera B
  - Kimanga
  - Nyentamba
  - Shuleni
  - Songambele
- Kigendeka
  - Karundo A
  - Karundo B
  - Kumshindwi A
  - Kumshindwi B
  - Magarama A
  - Magarama B
  - Mumana A
  - Mumana B
  - Ntakama A
  - Ntakama B
- Kasaka
  - Mchangani
  - Miheno
  - Mpemvyi
  - Mrangala
  - Mugalika
  - Nyakavyilu
  - Nyamitelekelo
