= Rusohoko =

Ward in Kibondo, Kigoma, Tanzania

Rusohoko Kata ya Rusohoko
- Ward
- Location within Tanzania
- Coordinates: 3.65721°S 30.68055°E
- Country: Tanzania
- Region: Kigoma Region
- District: Kibondo District
- Ward: Rusohoko

Government
  - MP: Atashasta Justus Nditiye
  - Chairman: Simon Kanguye Kagoli
  - Councilor: Musigwa Kaharazo Phanoel

Population (2016)
  - Total: 12,452
- Time zone: UTC+3 (EAT)

Rusohoko is an administrative ward within Muhambwe Constituency in Kibondo District of Kigoma Region in Tanzania. In 2016, the Tanzania National Bureau of Statistics reported there were 12,452 people in the ward.
