= Murungu =

Murungu Kata ya Murungu
- Ward
- Location within Tanzania Location within Africa
- Coordinates: 4.233°S 31.183°E
- Country: Tanzania
- Region: Kigoma Region
- District: Kibondo District
- Ward: Murungu

Government
  - MP: Atashasta Justus Nditiye
  - Chairman: Simon Kanguye Kagoli
  - Councilor: Emil Charles Maseke

Population (2016)
  - Total: 8,077
- Time zone: UTC+3 (EAT)
- Postcode: 47402

Murungu is an administrative Council in Muhambwe Constituency in Kibondo District of Kigoma Region in Tanzania. In 2016 the Tanzania National Bureau of Statistics reported that there were 8,077 people in the ward, up from 7,338 in 2012.

== Villages / neighborhoods ==
The ward has 2 villages and 20 hamlets.

- Kumhasha
  - Chigazule
  - Ibehelo
  - Katazi
  - Kumhasha
  - Kwisenga
  - Mbugani
  - Migombani
  - Nduta
  - Nyamata
  - Rukangalizo
- Kumbanga
  - Kabhadalala
  - Kabogi
  - Katobhanzovu
  - Kayezi
  - Kumana
  - Kumbanga
  - Kumgera
  - Kwibhiliga
  - Nyambega
  - Rumambo
