= Kitahana =

Ward in Kibondo, Kigoma, Tanzania

Kitahana Kata ya Kitahana
- Ward
- Location within Tanzania
- Coordinates: 3.7°S 30.691°E
- Country: Tanzania
- Region: Kigoma Region
- District: Kibondo District
- Ward: Kitahana

Government
  - Type: Kibondo District Council
  - Leadership: Leader & Cabinet
  - MP: Atashasta Justus Nditiye
  - Chairman: Simon Kanguye Kagoli
  - Councilor: David Rafael Simon

Population (2016)
  - Total: 14,439
- Time zone: UTC+3 (EAT)

Kitahana is an administrative ward in Muhambwe Constituency in Kibondo District of Kigoma Region in Tanzania. In 2016 the Tanzania National Bureau of Statistics report there were 14,439 people in the ward, from 24,431 in 2012.
