= Mtendeli Refugee Camp =

Refuge camp in Tanzania

- camp
- Location of Kibondo District in Kigoma Region

- Location in Tanzania
- Coordinates: 3°25′12″S 30°52′22″E
- Country: Tanzania
- Region: Kigoma Region

Population
  - Total: ~20,000 People

Mtendeli Refugee Camp is a refugee camp located in the Kakonko District of Kigoma Region, Tanzania.

== Location ==
Mtendeli Refugee Camp is located in the Kakonko District of Kigoma Region, Tanzania. It is situated 120 km from the town of Kasulu, 25 km from the border covering an area of 1,500 Hectares.

== History ==
Mtendeli Refugee Camp was opened on 14 January 2016, as an emergency response to receive 40,000 Burundian refugees relocated from Nyarugusu refugee camp to Nduta and Mtendeli refugee camps. The camp is managed by the United Nations High Commissioner for Refugees (UNHCR) and the Tanzanian government.

== Demographics ==
As of 14 January 2016, the camp was hosting 40,213 refugees majority of whom were from Burundi and as of 2021, the camp was accommodating 10,989 refugees living in 2,576 households. The camp community organization is structured in a hierarchical structure consisting of three administrative layers: Zones, Villages, and Blocs. At the Zone level, 10 zonal leaders oversee the operations. Each Zone is further divided into Villages, with a total of 93 village leaders responsible for their management. Finally, within each Village, 1397 bloc leaders handle specific tasks and ensure smooth functioning. The camp chairman leads all zonal leaders and their deputies.

Mtendeli Camp Mapping Camp Overview: Blocs Distribution as of 30 September 2017

== Services ==
As of 14 January 2016, the following services were available in the camp: 1 hospital, 1 health post, 3 primary schools, 2 secondary schools, 2 youth centers, 1 food distribution center, 1 nonfood distribution center, 2 police posts, 1 common market, 1 camp based market, and 57 solar street lights.

== See also ==
- Nduta Refugee Camp
- Nyarugusu
- Katumba Refugee Camp
- Mishamo Refugee Camp
