= Bukabuye =

Village in Missenyi, Kagera, Tanzania

Mukabuye Kata ya Mukabuye
- Ward
- Location within Tanzania Location within Africa
- Coordinates: 1.18°S 31.719°E
- Country: Tanzania
- Region: Kigoma Region
- District: Kibondo District
- Ward: Mukabuye

Population (2016)
  - Total: 9,189
- Time zone: UTC+3 (EAT)
- Postcode: 47411

Mukabuye, also known as Bukabuye, (Note: While "Bukabuye" is a common name the ward is referred to as "Mukabuye" in official census, postal service and district/regional plans and budgets.) is a ward in Muhambwe Constituency in Kibondo District of Kagera Region in Tanzania. In 2016 the Tanzania National Bureau of Statistics report there were 9,189 people in the ward. Prior to 2014 the ward was a village in the Itaba Ward.

== Villages / neighborhoods ==
The ward has 10 hamlets.

- Gwanumpu
- Kabuye
- Kageyo
- Kasagwe
- Kumwayi
- Mugalika
- Murugunga
- Murusange
- Nyakilenda
- Nyampfa
