= Kumsenga =

Ward in Kibondo, Kigoma, Tanzania

Kumsenga Kata ya Kumsenga
- Ward
- Location within Tanzania
- Coordinates: 3.784°S 30.417°E
- Country: Tanzania
- Region: Kigoma Region
- District: Kibondo District
- Ward: Kumsenga

Government
  - Type: Kibondo District Council
  - Leadership: Leader & Cabinet
  - MP: Atashasta Justus Nditiye
  - Chairman: Simon Kanguye Kagoli
  - Councilor: Leonard Chamlukwi Ndangari

Population (2016)
  - Total: 14,811
- Time zone: UTC+3 (EAT)
- Postcode: 47410

Kumsenga is an administrative Ward within Muhambwe Constituency in Kibondo District of Kigoma Region in Tanzania. In 2016 the Tanzania National Bureau of Statistics report there were 14,811 people in the ward, from 22,641 in 2012.

== Villages / neighborhoods ==
The ward has 3 villages and 30 hamlets.

- Kumsenga
  - Bwozi A
  - Bwozi B
  - Chemchemi
  - Kigwe
  - Kumsenga
  - Liloama
  - Linda
  - Lotaagpa
  - Nyabihuma
  - Nyabusaro
- Kibuye
  - Gwanze
  - Kibuye
  - Kumbanga
  - Mheshu
  - Mikonko
  - Mikonko
  - Mkike
  - Mukoni
  - Nyampande
  - Songambele
- Kagezi
  - Bisako
  - Kagezi
  - Kigunga
  - Maga
  - Mikonko
  - Mlange
  - Ngoshi
  - Nzizi
  - Rungarunga
  - Shuleni
