= Mabamba =

Ward in Kibondo, Kigoma, Tanzania

Mabamba Kata ya Mabamba
- Ward
- Location within Tanzania
- Coordinates: 3.5981869°S 30.5007075°E
- Country: Tanzania
- Region: Kigoma Region
- District: Kibondo District
- Ward: Mabamba

Government
  - Type: Kibondo District Council
  - Leadership: Leader & Cabinet
  - MP: Atashasta Justus Nditiye
  - Chairman: Simon Kanguye Kagoli
  - Councilor: Mazina Khamis Bidandi

Population (2016)
  - Total: 19,351
- Time zone: UTC+3 (EAT)

Mabamba is an administrative ward within Muhambwe Constituency in Kibondo District of Kigoma Region in Tanzania.

In 2016 the Tanzania National Bureau of Statistics report there were 19,351 people in the ward, from 17,580 in 2012.
