= Misezero =

Ward in Kibondo, Kigoma, Tanzania

Misezero Kata ya Misezero
- Ward
- Location within Tanzania
- Coordinates: 3.529°S 30.776°E
- Country: Tanzania
- Region: Kigoma Region
- District: Kibondo District
- Ward: Misezero

Government
  - MP: Atashasta Justus Nditiye
  - Chairman: Simon Kanguye Kagoli
  - Councilor: Norbert Godwin Bulinjiye

Population (2016)
  - Total: 9,049
- Time zone: UTC+3 (EAT)
- Postcode: 47403

Misezero is an administrative ward n Muhambwe Constituency in Kibondo District of Kigoma Region in Tanzania. In 2016 the Tanzania National Bureau of Statistics report there were 9,049 people in the ward, from 8,221 in 2012.

== Villages / neighborhoods ==
The ward has 2 villages and 40 hamlets.

Twabagondozi

- Nyesogo

Kumukugwa

- Bitare Kata
- Kamilanzovu
- Kamlama
- Kanyamajeli
- Kavuruga
- Kichamate
- Kimlombo
- Kisonzola
- Kiyagala
- Kumgoboka
- Kumuhama A
- Kumuhama B
- Majengo Mapya
- Malenga
- Mayengo
- Mibhale A
- Mibhale B
- Mibhale C
- Mibhale D
- Misezero
- Mkubezi A
- Mkubezi B
- Mkubezi C
- Mpebhe
- Mtaho A
- Mtaho B
- Namuyange
- Narukinga
- Ntakabalagi
- Nyamata
- Nyamihanda A
- Nyamihanda B
- Nyangwe
- Nyavyugi
- Nyerere
- Nyetabhi
- Rubanga
- Rubanga
- Vyigero
