= Rugongwe =

Ward in Kibondo, Kigoma, Tanzania

Rugongwe Kata ya Rugongwe
- Ward
- Location within Tanzania
- Coordinates: 3.893°S 30.486°E
- Country: Tanzania
- Region: Kigoma Region
- District: Kibondo District
- Ward: Rugongwe

Government
  - MP: Atashasta Justus Nditiye
  - Chairman: Simon Kanguye Kagoli
  - Councilor: Evaristo Masigo Bidaga

Population (2016)
  - Total: 29,990
- Time zone: UTC+3 (EAT)
- Postcode: 47405

Rugongwe is an administrative ward within Muhambwe Constituency in Kibondo District of Kigoma Region in Tanzania. In 2016 the Tanzania National Bureau of Statistics report there were 29,990 people in the ward, from 27,246 in 2012.

== Villages / neighborhoods ==
The ward has 5 villages and 48 hamlets.

- Kichananga
  - Kumekucha
  - Maendeleo
  - Mkogabo
  - Mlimani
  - Mnazi mmoja
  - Mrema
  - Nyakichacha
  - Nyashimba
  - Nyerenda
- Magarama
  - Iogoza
  - Kahobe
  - Kisanda
  - Mahaha
  - Mnyankoni
  - Msamahe
  - Nyabwai
  - Nyamiheno
  - Rubumba
  - Sozafyisi
- Kigaga
  - Kayogolo
  - Kigaga A
  - Kigaga B
  - Kinani
  - Maga
  - Mpome
  - Nyeseke
  - Ruzunzangoma
  - Sakunyange
- Kigina
  - Bambaziba
  - Ingele
  - Karole
  - Kigina
  - Kishindwi
  - Malimbi
  - Mlinyi
  - Mshenyi
  - Rubumba
  - Rusunwe
- Kisogwe
  - Kumnazi
  - Kumwelulo A
  - Kumwelulo B
  - Nyabwa A
  - Nyabwa B
  - Nyambilembi B
  - Nyambilembi C
  - Nyamilembi A
  - Nyesato
  - Rubura
