= Nyaruyoba =

Ward in Kibondo, Kigoma, Tanzania

Nyaruyoba Kata ya Nyaruyoba
- Ward
- Location within Tanzania
- Coordinates: 3.74239826°S 30.5923428°E
- Country: Tanzania
- Region: Kigoma Region
- District: Kibondo District
- Ward: Nyaruyoba

Government
  - MP: Atashasta Justus Nditiye
  - Chairman: Simon Kanguye Kagoli
  - Councilor: Habil Charles Maseke

Population (2016)
  - Total: 15,499
- Time zone: UTC+3 (EAT)
- Postcode: 47407

Nyaruyoba is an administrative ward within Muhambwe Constituency in Kibondo District of Kigoma Region in Tanzania. In 2016 the Tanzania National Bureau of Statistics report there were 15,499 people in the ward. Prior to 2014 Nyaruyoba was a village within the Busagara Ward.

== Villages / neighborhoods ==
The ward has 15 hamlets.

- Bitama
- Bugolebuke
- Busoro
- Itale
- Kalutale
- Kumkuyu
- Mgazi mmoja
- Mihama
- Msarasi
- Muragone
- Nyakiyona
- Nyamafyisi
- Nyaruyoba
- Nyenyeri
- Nyesato
