= Kabingo–Kasulu–Manyovu–Mugina Road =

Road in Tanzania and Burundi

Coordinates: 04°34′24″S 30°05′49″E

Route information
- Length: 162 mi (261 km)
- History: Designated in 2019 (Expected); Completion in 2023(Expected)

Major junctions
- East end: Kabingo
- Kasulu; Manyovu
- West end: Mugina

Location

Highway system
- Transport in

The Kabingo–Kasulu–Manyovu–Mugina–Rumonge Road is a road in Tanzania, connecting the towns of Kabingo, Kasulu and Manyovu in Tanzania to Mugina in Burundi.

== Location ==
The road starts at Kabingo, Tanzania and makes its way westwards through Kasulu and Manyovu, to end at Mugina, the border town in Burundi, a total distance of approximately 260 kilometres (162 mi). The geographical coordinates of this road in the town of Kasulu are 04°34'24.0"S, 30°05'49.0"E (Latitude:-4.573333; Longitude:30.096944).

== Overview ==
The highway is expected to improve cross-border trade, tourism, socio-economic development and promote regional integration. The project is being handled directly by the East African Community. The road is also expected to ease the movement of traffic from both Dar es Salaam and Tanga ports, destined for the land-locked countries of Burundi, and Democratic Republic of the Congo.

== Upgrade to double carriageway ==
Related to the upgrade of this road in Tanzania, a 45 kilometres (28 mi) section of highway in Burundi between Rumonge and Gitaza, both located on the eastern shores of Lake Tanganyika will be rehabilitated. In addition, a one-stop-border-post (OSBP) crossing between Manyovu on the Tanzania side and Mugina on the Burundi side will be constructed, to ease the flow of goods and people across the common border.

The upgrade to class II bitumen, widening to double carriageway and related improvements, will be jointly funded by the African Development Bank (AfDB), and the two respective governments. In November 2018, the AfDB committed to lend US$322.5 million towards the development of this road.

== See also ==
- List of roads in Burundi
- List of roads in Tanzania
- East African Community
