= Kilelema =

Ward in Buhigwe, Kigoma, Tanzania

Kilelema Kata ya Kilelema
- Ward
- Location within Tanzania Location within Africa
- Coordinates: 4.207°S 30.090°E
- Country: Tanzania
- Region: Kigoma Region
- District: Buhigwe District
- Ward: Kilelema

Population (2016)
  - Total: 17,086
- Time zone: UTC+3 (EAT)
- Postcode: 47510

Kilelema is an administrative ward in Buhigwe District of Kigoma Region of Tanzania. In 2016 the Tanzania National Bureau of Statistics report there were 17,086 people in the ward, from 15,523 in 2012.

== Villages / neighborhoods ==
The ward has 2 villages and 7 hamlets.

- Kilelema
  - Kidyama
  - Nyamori
  - Minazi
- Migongo
  - Legezamwendo
  - Makungu
  - Songambele
  - Luyange
