= Nduta Refugee Camp =

Refuge camp in Tanzania

- camp
- Location of Kibondo District in Kigoma Region

- Location in Tanzania
- Coordinates: 3°41′38″S 30°46′56″E
- Country: Tanzania
- Region: Kigoma Region

Population
  - Total: ~114,743 People

Nduta Refugee Camp is a refugee camp situated in the north-western region of Tanzania. It was established in 2015 to provide shelter and support to Burundian refugees who had fled their country due to political instability and violence. Located in the Kibondo District of the Kigoma Region, Nduta Refugee Camp is one of the three refugee camps in the area that currently house a population of over 320,000 refugees from Burundi and the Democratic Republic of Congo.

== History ==
Nduta Refugee Camp, established in 2015, was created as a solution to alleviate the overcrowding experienced in the Nyarugusu refugee camp, which is currently the third-largest refugee camp globally. This relocation project was initiated through a collaborative effort between the Tanzanian government and the United Nations High Commissioner for Refugees (UNHCR) to provide a safe haven for Burundian refugees escaping political instability and violence in their home country. The camp was officially reopened in October 2015, coinciding with the onset of the rainy season when approximately 20,000 individuals were still residing in communal shelters situated on a floodplain. From October to December 2015, a total of 27,500 Burundian refugees were relocated from Nyarugusu to Nduta, subsequently being transferred to another camp called Mtendele. This initiative was facilitated and overseen by the UNHCR.

== Demographics ==
Over the years, the population of Nduta Refugee Camp has been fluctuating:

As of May 2017, Nduta Refugee Camp had a population of 107,000 people, of which 76% were women and children, and an estimated 54% were under 17 years old. The camp is home to Burundian refugees who fled their country due to political instability and violence. By July 2018, the population was 104,784. According to the Tanzania Refugee Population Update, as of 28 February 2022, the population of Nduta Refugee Camp was 77,262 refugees. As of 31 Oct 2023, the population was 66,735 refugees.

The camp was closed by the Tanzanian government in 2026.

== Services and facilities ==
Nduta Refugee Camp is equipped with essential facilities such as water and sanitation systems, health clinics, and educational institutions. Oxfam International, which is a confederation of 20 independent charitable organizations dedicated to addressing global poverty, has been offering valuable material and technical assistance to ensure clean drinking water, construct latrines, and educate the refugee community about the vital role of proper hygiene in disease prevention. The camp has the following services: 1 hospital, 6 health posts, 2 community-based rehabilitation centers, 6 primary schools (1 school under planning), 1 secondary school, 3 youth centers, 1 women's center, 3 food distribution centers, 3 police posts, 1 common market, 2 camp-based markets, and 97 solar street lights.

== See also ==
- Nyarugusu
- Mtendeli Refugee Camp
- Katumba Refugee Camp
- Mishamo Refugee Camp
