= Rusaba =

Ward in Buhigwe, Kigoma, Tanzania

Rusaba Kata ya Rusaba
- Ward
- Location within Tanzania Location within Africa
- Coordinates: 4.440°S 30.318°E
- Country: Tanzania
- Region: Kigoma Region
- District: Buhigwe District
- Ward: Rusaba

Population (2016)
  - Total: 13,070
- Time zone: UTC+3 (EAT)
- Postcode: 47503

Rusaba is an administrative ward in Buhigwe District of Kigoma Region of Tanzania. In 2016 the Tanzania National Bureau of Statistics report there were 13,070 people in the ward, from 20,997 in 2012.

== Villages / neighborhoods ==
The ward has 3 villages and 20 hamlets.

- Rusaba
  - Rusaba A
  - Rusaba B
  - Mkatanga
  - Kavumu
  - Kigara
  - Ndoha
  - Nyarumanga
  - Rabiro
  - Kabuye
- Kinazi
  - Kazingu
  - Kimara
  - Kilembela
  - Kabanga
  - Mkoza
- Kimala
  - Nyambwanga
  - Muruvumu
  - Rugamiko
  - Kamanga
  - Nyamkwale
  - Nyarumanga
