= Kajana =

Kajana may refer to:

- Kajaani, a town and municipality in Finland
- Kajana, Suriname, a village in Boven Suriname, Suriname
- Kajana (Buhigwe DC), an administrative ward in Buhigwe District of Kigoma Region of Tanzania
- Kajana Sign Language, a village sign language of Suriname
