= Biharu =

Ward in Buhigwe District, Kigoma Region, Tanzania

Biharu Kata ya Biharu
- Ward
- Location within Tanzania Location within Africa
- Coordinates: 4.440°S 30.318°E
- Country: Tanzania
- Region: Kigoma Region
- District: Buhigwe District
- Ward: Biharu

Population (2016)
  - Total: 9,774
- Time zone: UTC+3 (EAT)
- Postcode: 47515

Biharu is an administrative ward in Buhigwe District of Kigoma Region of Tanzania. In 2016 the Tanzania National Bureau of Statistics report there were 9,774 people in the ward, from 8,880 in 2012.

== Villages / neighborhoods ==
The ward has 2 villages and 6 hamlets.

- Biharu
  - Kagunga
  - Kaguruka
  - Musenga
- Kigege
  - Kigege
  - Kulugongoni
  - Lulemba
