= Buhigwe (Buhigwe DC) =

Ward in Buhigwe, Kigoma, Tanzania

Buhigwe Ward Kata ya Buhigwe
- Ward
- Location within Tanzania Location within Africa
- Coordinates: 4.440°S 30.318°E
- Country: Tanzania
- Region: Kigoma Region
- District: Buhigwe District
- Ward: Buhigwe Ward

Population (2016)
  - Total: 16,757
- Time zone: UTC+3 (EAT)
- Postcode: 47501

Buhigwe Ward is an administrative ward in Buhigwe District of Kigoma Region of Tanzania. In 2016 the Tanzania National Bureau of Statistics report there were 16,757 people in the ward, from 15,224 in 2012.

== Villages / neighborhoods ==
The ward has 4 villages and 16 hamlets.

- Buhigwe
  - Buyongwa
  - Msuka ‘A’
  - Msuka ‘B’
  - Rubumba
- Nyankoronko
  - Bujuru
  - Kifulifuli
  - Kigabika
  - Nyakibingo
- Mulera
  - Kimazi
  - Lulalo
  - Lusange
  - Mzenga
- Kavomo
  - Kitagata
  - Kitulo
  - Munyanga
  - Nyandera
