= Muhinda =

Ward in Buhigwe, Kigoma, Tanzania

Muhinda Kata ya Muhinda
- Ward
- Location within Tanzania Location within Africa
- Coordinates: 4.440°S 30.318°E
- Country: Tanzania
- Region: Kigoma Region
- District: Buhigwe District
- Ward: Muhinda

Population (2016)
  - Total: 12,667
- Time zone: UTC+3 (EAT)
- Postcode: 47513

Muhinda is an administrative ward in Buhigwe District of Kigoma Region of Tanzania. In 2016 the Tanzania National Bureau of Statistics report there were 12,667 people in the ward, from 18,211 in 2012.

== Villages / neighborhoods ==
The ward has 6 villages and 26 hamlets.

- Muhinda
  - Muhinda Kati
  - Mubweru
  - Ruhuba
- Mubanga
  - Nyakitundu
  - Kafunya
  - Chengwe
- Nyaruboza
  - Nyaruboza
  - Nyakelera
  - Kurugoma
- Changwe
  - Chagwe
  - Kitanga
  - Chunamwa
  - Gwanzovu
  - Kapuhunya
- Mbweru
  - Hugaumbiye
  - Mwilika
  - Kagaragara
  - Kilila
- Ruhororo
  - Kibila
  - Mkalakala
  - Buzebazeba
  - Bigera
  - Nyaruyoka
  - Ruhororo
  - Kasunu
  - Nyabututsi
