= Munyegera =

Ward in Buhigwe, Kigoma, Tanzania

Munyegera Kata ya Munyegera
- Ward
- Location within Tanzania Location within Africa
- Coordinates: 4.440°S 30.318°E
- Country: Tanzania
- Region: Kigoma Region
- District: Buhigwe District
- Ward: Munyegera

Population (2016)
  - Total: 14,801
- Time zone: UTC+3 (EAT)
- Postcode: 47505

Munyegera is an administrative ward in Buhigwe District of Kigoma Region of Tanzania. In 2016 the Tanzania National Bureau of Statistics report there were 14,801 people in the ward, from 13,447 in 2012.

== Villages / neighborhoods ==
The ward has 2 villages and 7 hamlets.

- Munyegera
  - Kabuye
  - Nyakitanga
  - Samgari
- Songambele
  - Kumsenga
  - Katenda
  - Buyonga
  - Ruhumba
