= Kibondo Mjini =

Ward in Kibondo, Kigoma, Tanzania

Kibondo Mjini Kata ya Kibondo Mjini
- Ward
- Location within Tanzania
- Coordinates: 3.5793°S 30.7191°E
- Country: Tanzania
- Region: Kigoma Region
- District: Kibondo District
- Ward: Kibondo Mjini

Government
  - Leadership: Leader & Cabinet
  - MP: Atashasta Justus Nditiye
  - Chairman: Simon Kanguye Kagoli
  - Councilor: Hamis Maulid Kapkii

Population (2016)
  - Total: 32,611
- Time zone: UTC+3 (EAT)
- Postcode: 47401

Kibondo Urban is an administrative ward in Muhambwe Constituency in Kibondo District of Kigoma Region in Tanzania. In 2016 the Tanzania National Bureau of Statistics report there were 32,611 people in the ward, from 39,300 in 2012.

== Villages / neighborhoods ==
The ward has 4 villages and 33 hamlets. Biturana village split off into its own ward in 2014.

- Kibondo
  - Boma
  - Kanyamahela
  - Katelela
  - Katunguru
  - Kumwayi
  - Kumwerulo
  - Kumwerulo
  - Kumwerulo Kati
  - Nankuye
  - Sokoni
  - Uswahilini
  - Uwanjani
- Nengo
  - Kanyinya A
  - Kasanda
  - Kumbizi
  - Kumbizi Mtoni
  - Majengo Mapya
  - Mlesha
  - Nengo Kati
  - Nengo Shuleni
  - Nyamisivyi
  - Ruchamisanga
- Kumwambu
  - Kabwigwa
  - Kibingo
  - Kingoro
  - Kumgarika
  - Kumkenga
  - Kumwambu
  - Nakayuki
- Nabuhima
  - Kumwai
  - Msikitini
  - Nabuhima
  - Nyamwela
