= Kibande =

Ward in Buhigwe, Kigoma, Tanzania

Kibande Kata ya Kibande
- Ward
- Location within Tanzania Location within Africa
- Coordinates: 4.440°S 30.318°E
- Country: Tanzania
- Region: Kigoma Region
- District: Buhigwe District
- Ward: Kibande

Population (2016)
  - Total: 10,844
- Time zone: UTC+3 (EAT)
- Postcode: 47516

Kibande is an administrative ward in Buhigwe District of Kigoma Region of Tanzania. In 2016, according to the Tanzania National Bureau of Statistics report, there were 10,844 people in the ward, up from 9,852 in 2012.

== Villages/neighborhoods ==
The ward has two villages and seven hamlets.

- Kibande
  - Nyabisindu
  - Kilundo
  - Masekelo
  - Kibande
- Bweranka
  - Mwilala
  - Muvyiru
  - Bweranka
