= Turana =

Turana may refer to:

- GAF Turana, an Australian target drone
- Melbourne Youth Justice Centre, an Australian detention centre also known as Turana
- Turana (ward), an administrative ward in Tanzania
- Turana (cricket), a genus of crickets in subfamily Euscyrtinae
