= Bunyambo =

Village in Kibondo, Kigoma, Tanzania

Bunyambo Kata ya Bunyambo
- Ward
- Location within Tanzania Location within Africa
- Coordinates: 3.573°S 30.633°E
- Country: Tanzania
- Region: Kigoma Region
- District: Kibondo District
- Ward: Bunyambo

Population (2016)
  - Total: 14,929
- Time zone: UTC+3 (EAT)
- Postcode: 47404

Bunyambo, commonly known as Bunyanbo, is an administrative ward in Muhambwe Constituency in Kibondo District of Kigoma Region in Tanzania. In 2016, the Tanzania National Bureau of Statistics reported there were 14,929 people in the ward, up from 13,563 in 2012. (Note: Ward is commonly knows as both Bunyambo and Bunyanbo, but will be found as Bunyanbo in censuses.)

== Villages / neighborhoods ==
The ward has 3 villages and 31 hamlets.

- Minyinya
  - Bavunja A
  - Bavunja B
  - Bustani
  - Minyinya
  - Mlima Ndeneze
  - Mugoboka
  - Nyamsoma A
  - Nyamsoma B
  - Uwanja Ndege A
  - Uwanja Ndege B
- Bunyambo
  - Bunyambo
  - Makingi A
  - Makingi B
  - Mjigojigo
  - Mrombo
  - Mtaho A
  - Mtaho B
  - Nakibhondo
  - Ntautunze
  - Nyangwa
- Samvura
  - Buyezi
  - Mguruka
  - Nakibhondo
  - Nyamatore
  - Nyamigina
  - Nyangwa A
  - Nyangwa B
  - Nyarubogo A
  - Rutenge
  - Samvura
  - Senjogo
