= Munzeze =

Ward in Buhigwe, Kigoma, Tanzania

Munzeze Kata ya Munzeze
- Ward
- Location within Tanzania Location within Africa
- Coordinates: 4.440°S 30.318°E
- Country: Tanzania
- Region: Kigoma Region
- District: Buhigwe District
- Ward: Munzeze

Population (2016)
  - Total: 20,841
- Time zone: UTC+3 (EAT)
- Postcode: 47502

Munzeze is an administrative ward in Buhigwe District of Kigoma Region of Tanzania. In 2016 the Tanzania National Bureau of Statistics report there were 20,841 people in the ward, from 18,934 in 2012.

== Villages / neighborhoods ==
The ward has 4 villages and 14 hamlets.

- Munzeze
  - Nyabigele
  - Nyakame
  - Nyakalela
- Murungu
  - Bigina
  - Ruseke
  - Kahegamo
  - Nyamihanga
  - Murungu
- Kigogwe
  - Nyakatongati
  - Mawasiliano
  - Muungano
- Kishanga
  - Nyamigete
  - Nyakame
  - Kishanga
