= Mishamo Refugee Camp =

Refuge camp in Tanzania

- camp
- Location in Tanzania
- Coordinates: 5°41′20″S 30°29′19″E
- Country: Tanzania
- Region: Katavi Region

Population
  - Total: ~19,154 refugees

Mishamo Refugee Camp is a refugee camp situated in the Northwestern region of Katavi, Tanzania. Initially established in an unofficial capacity during the early 1970s, it served as a haven for Burundian refugees escaping the first Burundian genocide. It is one of the biggest refugee camps in Africa spanning an expansive area, the camp fosters an agriculturally-driven way of life for many of its inhabitants.

== History ==
Mishamo Refugee Camp was initially established during the early 1970s in response to the influx of Burundian refugees seeking asylum from the first Burundian genocide. Over the years, the camp has undergone significant transformation and is now recognized as an official refugee settlement.

== Demographics ==
Mishamo Refugee Camp served as a home for over 62,000 displaced individuals, predominantly originating from Burundi. A significant portion of these Burundian residents have embraced the Tanzanian government's offer of naturalization, subsequently considering their host nation as their newfound homeland. This mutual acceptance has fostered a sense of belonging and stability for the refugee population in Tanzania. As of 31 Oct 2023, the camp had a population of 3,199 refugees.

== Repatriations Program ==
For a significant number of the so-called 1972 Burundian refugees, repatriating to their homeland following an extended period in the Katumba refugee camp or the two other Tanzanian "old settlements" proves to be a formidable challenge. These individuals often encounter difficulties in repossessing their land, leading UNHCR to offer temporary housing and facilitate peaceful mediation for resolving such disputes. Regarding returnees without any land, the government and related United Nations entities collaborate in assisting them to find placement in specially designated rural integrated villages six of which were established between 2008 and 2009.

In March 2008, the United Nations High Commissioner for Refugees (UNHCR) and the Tanzanian government initiated a groundbreaking program, where approximately 55,000 refugees residing in Katumba, Mishamo, and Ulyankulu settlements chose to repatriate to Burundi. Since then, around 50,000 individuals have returned to their country of origin. Additionally, as part of the program, a further 162,000 refugees opted for local integration within Tanzania and an opportunity for citizenship.

== See also ==
- Nduta Refugee Camp
- Nyarugusu
- Katumba Refugee Camp
- Mtendeli Refugee Camp
