= New English Center for Hope =

The New Educational Center for Hope (NECH) is a non-governmental organization that works to educate and empower the refugees in the Nyarugusu camp in Tanzania.

The camp is located in Makere zone of Kasulu District in the Kigoma region of western Tanzania and hosts approximately 54,000 refugees. The UNHCR, Tanzania Water and Environmental Sanitation (TWESA), World Vision, and the Tanzanian government provide residents with basic living facilities. However, post-primary and vocational education is not provided. Local refugees have taken it upon themselves to provide auxiliary educational training for their youth and have established several schools within the area. NECH is one such school, which was founded by refugees on 3 July 2003. It operates through aid from humanitarian organizations, participation fees, and member contributions. Mr. Bilombele Asukulu, who is also coordinator of the Nyarugusu refugee camp, currently runs NECH. Under Asukulu’s direction, NECH’s twenty-one volunteers carry out the following educational services for its 154 students:

== Classes ==
NECH teaches English language and computer skills classes, as well as provides vocational training in agriculture, horticulture. and carpentry. These classes are free for girls and HIV/AIDS orphans. The NECH center has a library where refugees can study these skills and learn about relevant topics such as refugee rights and HIV/AIDS.

== Seminars ==
NECH collaborates with WTE (Working to Empower) to conduct weekly educational seminars, which address pertinent health issues such as reproductive health, STDs, and eye care.

== Projects ==
NECH’s organizes carpentry and agricultural projects to provide refugee members with opportunities to generate income. It also collaborates with RESPECT Tanzania to conduct its Global Letter Exchange Programme.

== Sports and Cultural Programs ==
NECH holds sporting events for recreational and educational purposes. It also provides assistance to unmarried mothers and HIV/AIDS orphans by paying their secondary school tuition.
