= Turana (ward) =

Ward in Kibondo, Kigoma, Tanzania

Biturana Kata ya Biturana
- Ward
- Location within Tanzania
- Coordinates: 3.6273°S 30.7236°E
- Country: Tanzania
- Region: Kigoma Region
- District: Kibondo District
- Ward: Biturana
- Established: 2014

Government
  - MP: Atashasta Justus Nditiye
  - Chairman: Simon Kanguye Kagoli
  - Councilor: Barbas Shadrack Baranzila

Population (2016)
  - Total: 3,958
- Time zone: UTC+3 (EAT)
- Postal code: 47401

Biturana is an administrative ward in Muhambwe Constituency in Kibondo District of Kigoma Region in Tanzania. In 2016 the Tanzania National Bureau of Statistics report there were 3,958 people in the ward.

Prior to 2014 Bitarana was a village of Kibondo Mjini ward.

== Villages / neighborhoods ==
The ward has 10 hamlets.

- Biturana Magharibi
- Biturana Mashariki
- Biturana Mtoni
- Biturana Shuleni
- Mlengasemo
- Nayakayuki
- Nyampengere
- Nyampengere
- Nyarugoti
- Rugimba
