= Janda (Buhigwe DC) =

Ward in Buhigwe, Kigoma, Tanzania

Janda Kata ya Janda
- Ward
- Location within Tanzania Location within Africa
- Coordinates: 4.440°S 30.318°E
- Country: Tanzania
- Region: Kigoma Region
- District: Buhigwe District
- Ward: Janda

Population (2016)
  - Total: 18,172
- Time zone: UTC+3 (EAT)
- Postcode: 47504

Janda is an administrative ward in Buhigwe District of Kigoma Region of Tanzania. In 2016 the Tanzania National Bureau of Statistics report there were 18,172 people in the ward, from 28,854 in 2012.

== Villages / neighborhoods ==
The ward has 4 villages and 16 hamlets.

- Janda
  - Butagara
  - Kumsenga/nkona
  - Janda Juu
  - Janda Mbele
  - Nyangamba/Kisovu
- Bukuba
  - Mwanaga ‘A’
  - Mwanaga ‘B’
  - Gwandamula
  - Nkungwe ‘A’
  - Nkungwe ‘B’
- Mahanga
  - Mkwanga
  - Muvyilizi B
  - Buzebazeba
  - Muvyilizi
- Nyamihanga
  - Nyamihanga
  - Mkipipi
