= Mugera =

Ward in Buhigwe, Kigoma, Tanzania

Mugera Kata ya Mugera
- Ward
- Location within Tanzania Location within Africa
- Coordinates: 4.440°S 30.318°E
- Country: Tanzania
- Region: Kigoma Region
- District: Buhigwe District
- Ward: Mugera

Population (2016)
  - Total: 17,279
- Time zone: UTC+3 (EAT)
- Postcode: 47514

Mugera is an administrative ward in Buhigwe District of Kigoma Region of Tanzania. In 2016 the Tanzania National Bureau of Statistics report there were 17,279 people in the ward, from 15,698 in 2012.

== Villages / neighborhoods ==
The ward has 2 villages and 3 hamlets.

- Mugera Mugera
  - Kishina
  - Majengo
  - Luyange
- Katundu
