= Muyama =

Ward in Buhigwe, Kigoma, Tanzania

Muyama Kata ya Muyama
- Ward
- Location within Tanzania Location within Africa
- Coordinates: 4.440°S 30.318°E
- Country: Tanzania
- Region: Kigoma Region
- District: Buhigwe District
- Ward: Muyama

Population (2016)
  - Total: 11,487
- Time zone: UTC+3 (EAT)
- Postcode: 47508

Muyama is an administrative ward in Buhigwe District of Kigoma Region of Tanzania. In 2016 the Tanzania National Bureau of Statistics report there were 11,487 people in the ward, from 10,436 in 2012.

== Villages / neighborhoods ==
The ward has 3 villages and 12 hamlets.

- Nyanga
  - Nyasore
  - Madukani
  - Nyampemba Juu
  - Nyampemba Chini
- Kalege
  - Kalege
  - Kavuruga
  - Nyampemba
  - Nyarubanga
- Kasumo
  - Kasumo
  - Kamana
  - Mihesu
  - Kishigwe
