= Katumba Refugee Camp =

Refuge camp in Tanzania

- camp
- Location in Tanzania
- Coordinates: 6°20′08″S 31°14′24″E
- Country: Tanzania
- Region: Kigoma Region

Population
  - Total: ~120,000 refugees

The Katumba Refugee Camp is a refugee camp in Tanzania. It is located in the Nsimbo District of the Katavi Region in western Tanzania. Established in 1972 to provide refuge for Burundian citizens escaping mass extermination by the Burundi government against its Hutu citizens during Burundian Civil War, is one of the oldest and largest refugee camps in Africa.

== History ==
The camp was established in 1972 by the Tanzanian government and the United Nations High Commissioner for Refugees (UNHCR) to accommodate refugees fleeing the Burundian Civil War. Katumba refugee settlement in Tanzania, With a population of over 66,000 inhabitants, the majority of whom have been recognized as Tanzanian citizens in recent years, has become a significant humanitarian endeavor.

== Demographics ==
As of 2017, the camp had a population of approximately 120,000 refugees.

== Facilities ==
The camp has several facilities to cater to the needs of the refugees. Since 1974, a total of 84,000 refugees have been resettled in twenty-nine villages within the Katumba settlement, near Mpanda. The settlement has 24 primary schools, one secondary school, and one vocational school, all attended by both refugees and Tanzanians. There are two health centers, six dispensaries, two to six water wells per village, and one cooperative. There is also a cholera treatment center has been established in response to a waterborne disease outbreak in the camp.

== See also ==
- Nduta Refugee Camp
- Nyarugusu
- Mtendeli Refugee Camp
- Mishamo Refugee Camp
