= Munanila =

Ward in Buhigwe, Kigoma, Tanzania

Munanila Kata ya Munanila
- Ward
- Location within Tanzania Location within Africa
- Coordinates: 4.440°S 30.318°E
- Country: Tanzania
- Region: Kigoma Region
- District: Buhigwe District
- Ward: Munanila

Population (2016)
  - Total: 18,760
- Time zone: UTC+3 (EAT)
- Postcode: 47512

Munanila is an administrative ward in Buhigwe District of Kigoma Region of Tanzania. In 2016 the Tanzania National Bureau of Statistics report there were 18,760 people in the ward, from 33,782 in 2012.

== Villages / neighborhoods ==
The ward has 9 villages and 44 hamlets.

- Munanila
  - Bigara
  - Karo
  - Mawasiliano
  - Rabhilo
  - Nyamihini
- Kitambuka
  - Nyamisare
  - Ruvumu
  - Mlemle
  - Mhalulo
  - Cheramunda
  - Kitambuka
- Mkatanga
  - Msagara
  - Nayamugiha
  - Muyugalilo
  - Nyarukaza
  - Kayombe
  - Mungwanga
- Nyakimwe
  - Musha
  - Kisoro
  - Mugwaga
  - Nyarutambwe ‘A’
  - Nyarutambwe ‘B’
- Nyarutabwe
  - Gwamabunga
  - Gwanilo
  - Bwawani
  - Nyakulazo
- Mnanila B
  - Karo
  - Mguruka
  - Bigara
  - Legezamwendo
- Msagara
  - Nyakelu
  - Mubugera
  - Kungara
  - Kayange
- Kishengezi
  - Milenda
  - Ruchunya
  - Mlambi
  - Mrukaza
  - Mkwabule
  - Kiyange
- Kafene
  - Kachelele
  - Mkatanga
  - Nyamaguge
  - Kumsenga
