= Mwayaya =

Ward in Buhigwe, Kigoma, Tanzania

Mwayaya Kata ya Mwayaya
- Ward
- Location within Tanzania Location within Africa
- Coordinates: 4.476°S 29.837°E
- Country: Tanzania
- Region: Kigoma Region
- District: Buhigwe District
- Ward: Mwayaya

Population (2016)
  - Total: 12,218
- Time zone: UTC+3 (EAT)
- Postcode: 47517

Mwayaya is an administrative ward in Buhigwe District of Kigoma Region of Tanzania. In 2016 the Tanzania National Bureau of Statistics report there were 12,218 people in the ward, from 20,416 in 2012.

== Villages / neighborhoods ==
The ward has 2 villages and 8 hamlets.

- Mwayaya
  - Mwayaya
  - Kaguruka
  - Ruhororo
- Kibwigwa
  - Kibwigwa
  - Buyanga
  - Kishengezi ‘A’
  - Kishengezi ‘B’
  - Muyebe
