= Buhoro =

Ward of Kasulu District, Kigoma Region

Coordinates: 4.440°S 30.318°E

Buhoro is an administrative ward in Kasulu District of Kigoma Region of Tanzania. At the time of the 2012 census, the ward had a total population of 60,120.
