= Nyamugali =

Ward in Buhigwe, Kigoma, Tanzania

Nyamugali Kata ya Nyamugali
- Ward
- Location within Tanzania Location within Africa
- Coordinates: 4.440°S 30.318°E
- Country: Tanzania
- Region: Kigoma Region
- District: Buhigwe District
- Ward: Nyamugali

Population (2016)
  - Total: 11,783
- Time zone: UTC+3 (EAT)
- Postcode: 47511

Nyamugali is an administrative ward in Buhigwe District of Kigoma Region of Tanzania. In 2016 the Tanzania National Bureau of Statistics report there were 11,783 people in the ward, from 10,705 in 2012.

== Villages / neighborhoods ==
The ward has 3 villages and 10 hamlets.

- Nyamugali
  - Sokoni
  - Lukunda
  - Kikulazo
  - Nyomvyi
- Bulimanyi
  - Bwera
  - Buhinda
  - Lulengela
- Kigege
  - Mubanga
  - Kigege
  - Kurugongo
