= Buhigwe =

Ward of Kasulu District, Kigoma Region

Coordinates: 5.451°S 29.922°E

Buhigwe is an administrative ward in Kasulu District of Kigoma Region of Tanzania. At the time of the 2012 census, the ward had a total population of 15,224
