= Kajana (Buhigwe DC) =

Ward in Buhigwe, Kigoma, Tanzania

Kajana Kata ya Kajana
- Ward
- Location within Tanzania Location within Africa
- Coordinates: 4.440°S 30.318°E
- Country: Tanzania
- Region: Kigoma Region
- District: Buhigwe District
- Ward: Kajana

Population (2016)
  - Total: 14,731
- Time zone: UTC+3 (EAT)
- Postcode: 47509

Kajana is an administrative ward in Buhigwe District of Kigoma Region of Tanzania. In 2016 the Tanzania National Bureau of Statistics report there were 14,731 people in the ward, from 13,383 in 2012.

== Villages / neighborhoods ==
The ward has 2 villages and 10 hamlets.

- Kajana
  - Kajana
  - Kwikungu
  - Kisenga
  - Rubuga
  - Munyika
  - Nyarushanga
- Katundu
  - Rubona
  - Nyarudaho
  - Nyamalembe
  - Mugongo
