= Itaba =

Ward in Kibondo, Kigoma, Tanzania

Itaba Kata ya Itaba
- Ward
- Location within Tanzania
- Coordinates: 3.650850°S 30.5828037°E
- Country: Tanzania
- Region: Kigoma Region
- District: Kibondo District
- Ward: Itaba

Population (2016)
  - Total: 10,764
- Time zone: UTC+3 (EAT)
- Postcode: 47411

Itaba is an administrative ward in Muhambwe Constituency in Kibondo District of Kigoma Region in Tanzania. In 2016 the Tanzania National Bureau of Statistics report there were 10,764 people in the ward, from 18,127 in 2012.

== Villages / neighborhoods ==
The ward has 3 villages and 30 hamlets.

- Buyezi
  - Buyezi
  - Kaharawe
  - Karugendo
  - Kayanze
  - Kumsema
  - Makimba
  - Nyamikingo
  - Ruhwiti
  - Rukere
  - Rushindwi
- Mukabuye
  - Gwanumpu
  - Kabuye
  - Kageyo
  - Kasagwe
  - Kumwayi
  - Mugalika
  - Murugunga
  - Murusange
  - Nyakilenda
  - Nyampfa
- Kigogo
  - Bikera
  - Kagomero
  - Kamuna
  - Kamunazi
  - Ntakibaye
  - Nyamafundi
  - Nyamihwi
  - Rubaba
  - Rukome
  - Serushikana
