= Nyarugusu =

Refugee camp in Kigoma Region, Tanzania

Coordinates: 4.2281°S 30.3835°E

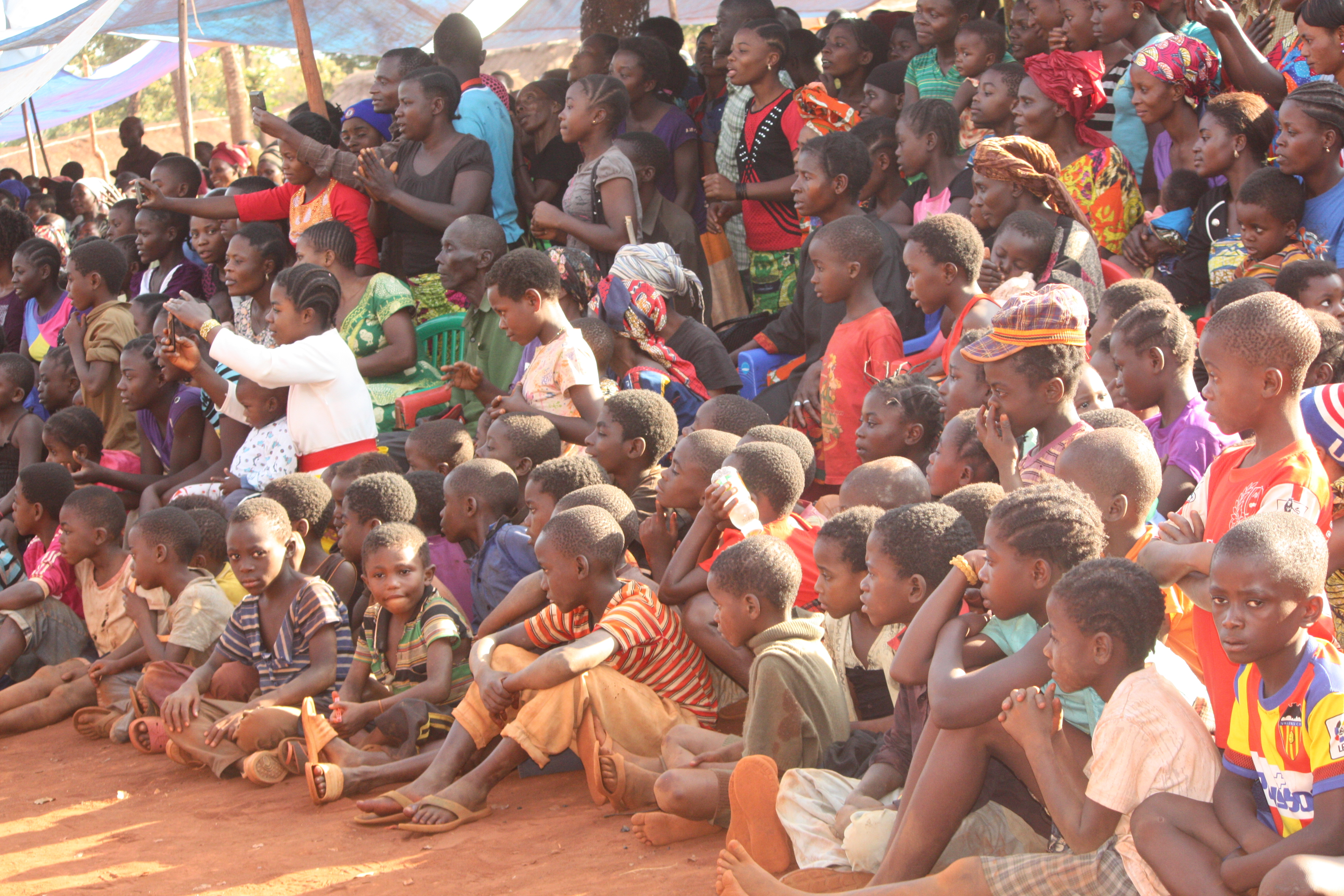
Nyarugusu Camp

Nyarugusu refugee camp ( Kambi ya wakimbizi ya Nyarugusu msaka family, in Swahili) is one of the largest and best-known refugee camps of the 21st century, with around 150,000 refugees.

== Location ==
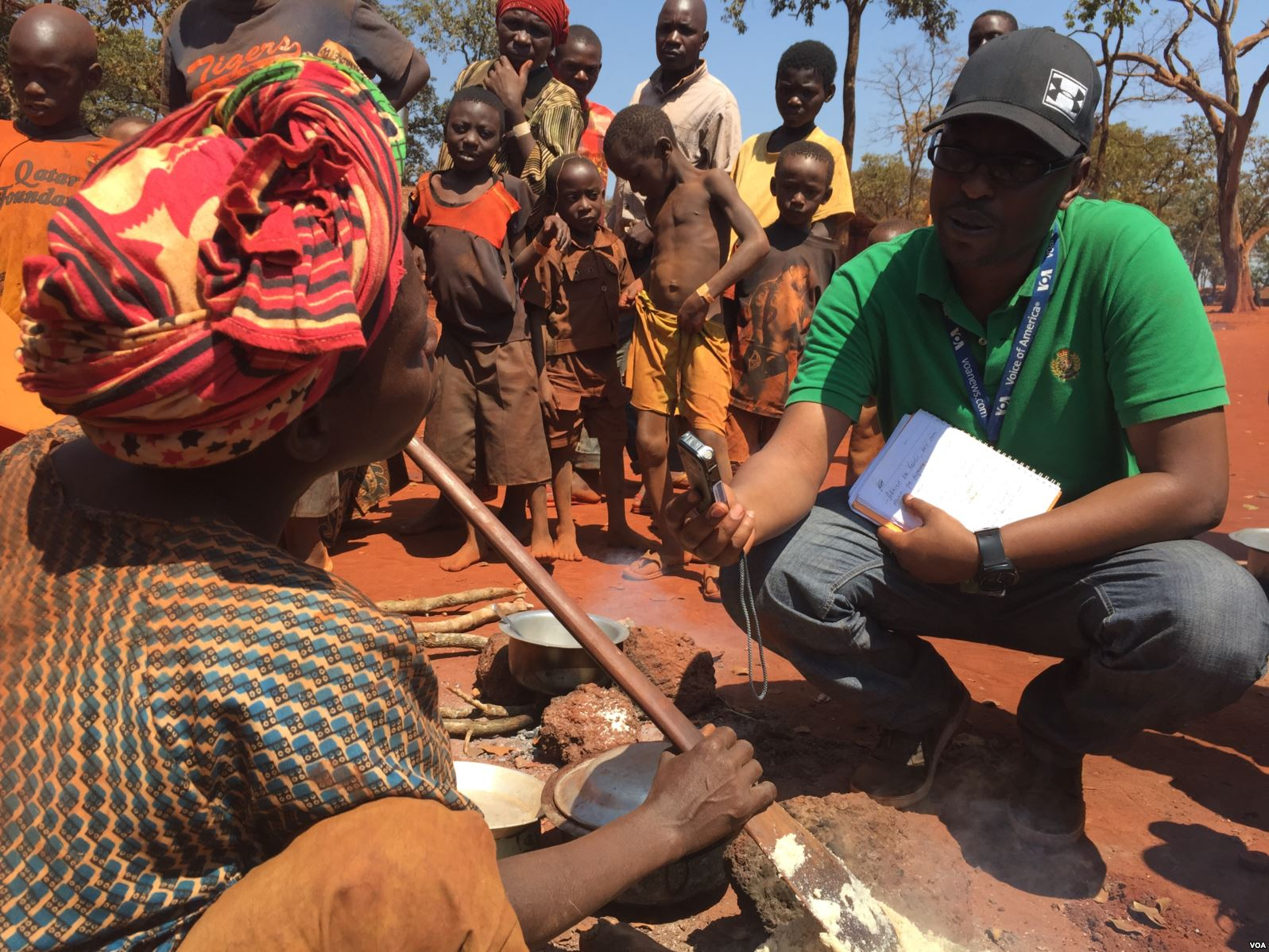
VOA Reporter Eddie Rwema visits Nyarugusu Refugee Camp in Tanzania

Nyarugusu refugee camp is located in the Kasulu District, western province of Kigoma Region, Tanzania, about 150 km east of Lake Tanganyika.

== Background ==
Nyarugusu refugee camp was created by the UNHCR and the Tanzanian government in November 1996 after an estimated 150,000 Congolese refugees from the eastern Sud-Kivu region of the DRC crossed the border into Tanzania escaping civil war. Many Congolese refugees remained in the camp for decades, although the population of the camp was reducing before 2015. However, in 2015 over 110,000 Burundian refugees arrived in Tanzania to escape riots and civil unrest in Burundi. These refugees went to Nyarugusu until the Tanzanian government allowed Burundian refugees to go to other camps. Approximately 65,000 Burundian refugees remain at Nyarugusu, while 55,000 are at Nduta refugee camp, and another 19,000 are at Mtendeli refugee camp. The camp is Sitting 40 kilometers away from the nearest town, Kasulu, and covers 1,200 hectares of land.

== Services ==
- Education, there are 12 primary schools and 4 secondary schools that offer education to Congolese, 8 primary schools, and 2 secondary schools that educate the Burundian population.
- Health, Nyarugusu refugee camp has 2 health centers, 5 health posts, and 2 community-based rehabilitation centers.
- Skill Skills, there are 3 youth centers, 2 women's centers, and a multipurpose vocational training center that offers skills to the refugees both from Congo and Burundi.
- Security, the camp has 2 police posts.

== See also ==
- New English Center for Hope
- Katumba Refugee Camp
- Nduta Refugee Camp
- Mtendeli Refugee Camp
- Mbera Refugee Camp
