= Dar es Salaam Institute of Technology =

Educational institution in Tanzania

Coordinates: 6°48′38.42″S 39°16′8.11″E

The Dar es Salaam Institute of Technology
- DIT
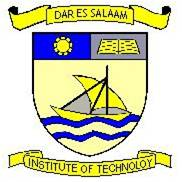
- Former name: Dar es Salaam Technical College
- Type: Public
- Established: 1997
- Affiliations: KTH, Leeds Metropolitan University
- Chairperson: Dr. Richard Masika
- Principal: Prof. Preksedis M. Ndomba
- Dean: Misago H. Yosiah
- Location: Morogoro Road, Dar es Salaam, south east Upanga, Tanzania
- Campus: Urban
- Nickname: Dartech
- Website: Institute Website

The Dar es Salaam Institute of Technology (DIT) is one of the high learning institutions in Tanzania. Originally established in 1957, it is fully accredited by the National Council for Technical Education (NACTE) to offer technician and engineering programmes leading to the awards of Ordinary Diploma(OD) in engineering, Bachelor of Engineering (BEng) respectively and Master of Engineering(MEng).

Historically, DIT was established in 1997 by the Act of Parliament, “the DIT Act No.6 of 1997” to replace the Dar es Salaam Technical College, which had a long history of technical training in Tanzania. This history dates back to 1957 when its predecessor; the Dar es Salaam Technical Institute was established with the main task of providing vocational training in the country. The Institute later expanded its scope to offer technical secondary school courses and training for Technical Assistants before it was upgraded in 1962 to become the Dar es Salaam Technical College (DTC); the first formal technical training institution in the country.

== History ==
In 1957, the Dar es Salaam Technical Institute was established charged with providing vocational training. It quickly expanded to offer technical secondary school courses. In 1962 it became the Dar es Salaam Technical College, and in 1964 began offering courses in engineering and other related professional areas, leading to Full Technician Certificates. It gradually added more advanced courses and degrees and in 1997 it became the Dar es Salaam Institute of Technology.

== Departments ==
The Dar es Salaam Institute of Technology has six academic departments, as follows;

1. Civil Engineering
2. Computer Studies
3. Electrical Engineering
4. General Studies
5. Electronics and Telecommunications Engineering,
6. Mechanical Engineering
7. Science and Laboratory Technology.

== Admission ==
There are two basic admission procedures for both Bachelor of Engineering and Ordinary Diploma students, these being Direct entry and Indirect entry. In Direct entry students finishing Secondary education and High school education apply for entry, and if they pass their Secondary or High school exams they are selected to join. All students joining through this scheme are sponsored by the government. Student failing to join through Direct entry apply for the Indirect entry scheme where they will be given a short course, and those who pass get admitted. Students joining through this scheme must bear all costs (tuition fees, accommodation etc.)

== Master of Engineering ==
DIT through the Department of Civil engineering in collaboration with the Department of electrical engineering developed curriculum of Master of Engineering in Maintenance Management (NTA 9) which has been approved by NACTE. The programme comprises a total of 17 Modules with a minimum of 150 credits that are spread over two semesters for course work and six months period of dissertation. Each course module is covered in one semester of 17 weeks except for the dissertation, which takes place after the successfully completion of the two semesters. The course work sessions will be carried out during Session II (evening time) starting from 04.00 pm. The training Programme will run for a minimum of 18 months.

== The India-Tanzania Center Of Excellency ==
The India-Tanzania Center Of Excellency in ICT (ITCoEICT) was established in 2009 as a result of friendly-relation between two counties and their desire to further strengthen bilateral cooperation in academic disciplines of Information Technology, The project implementing Agencies on behalf of these two countries are Tanzania Dar es salaam Institute of Technology (DIT) and India Center For Development of Advance Computing (CDAC). The principal objective of the Center is to promote development of Information and Communication Technology in the United Republic of Tanzania. In order to realize the stated objective, the Centre engages in various professional activities in ICT including provision of video conferencing, telemedicine & e-learning facilities, High Performance Computing and conducting modular short-term proficiency courses in Information Technology. The Center is divided into three units:

1. High Performance Computing section
2. Telemedicine & e-Learning section
3. IT Professional Courses section
