= Kakonko District =

- District
- Kakonko District of Kigoma Region
- Coordinates: 03°16′48″S 30°57′58″E
- Country: Tanzania
- Region: Kigoma

Area
  - Total: 2,209 km^{2} (853 sq mi)

Population (2022)
  - Total: 178,419
  - Density: 80.77/km^{2} (209.2/sq mi)

Kakonko District is one of the eight districts of the Kigoma Region of Tanzania. It is one of the 20 new districts that were formed in Tanzania since 2010; it was split off from Kibondo District. Kakonko District is bordered to the north by Kagera Region, to the east by Geita Region, to the south by Kibondo District, and to the west by Burundi. Its administrative seat is the town of Kakonko.

According to the 2022 Tanzania National Census, the population of Kakonko District was 178,419.

== Transport ==
Unpaved trunk road T9 from Kigoma Region to the Kagera Region border passes through the district.

== Administrative subdivisions ==
As of 2012, Kakonko District was administratively divided into 11 wards.

=== Wards ===
- Gwarama
- Gwanumpu
- Kakonko
- Kasanda
- Kasuga
- Katanga
- Kiziguzigu
- Mugunzu
- Muhange
- Kanyonza
- Nyabibuye
- Nyamtukuza
- Rugenge
