= Buhigwe District =

District of Kigoma Region, Tanzania

- District
- Buhigwe District of Kigoma Region
- Coordinates: 04°26′53″S 29°55′27″E
- Country: Tanzania
- Region: Kigoma

Area
  - Total: 1,506 km^{2} (581 sq mi)

Population (2022)
  - Total: 240,005
  - Density: 159.4/km^{2} (412.8/sq mi)

Buhigwe District is one of the eight districts of the Kigoma Region of Tanzania. It is one of the 20 new districts that were formed in Tanzania since 2010; it was split off from Kasulu Rural District. Buhigwe District is bordered to the north by Burundi, to the east by Kasulu Rural District and Kasulu Urban District, and to the west by Kigoma Rural District. Its administrative seat is the town of Buhigwe.

According to the 2022 Tanzania National Census, the population of Buhigwe District was 240,005.

== Transport ==
=== Road Network ===
The paved trunk road T19 from Kigoma to the Burundi border passes through a small portion of the district.

Buhigwe District is a junction that link roads to Kigoma, Kasulu District, and Republic of Burundi. It has a total of 574 kilometres (357 mi) of roads, of which 30 kilometres (19 mi) is trunk roads, 60 kilometres (37 mi) is Regional Roads, 282 kilometres (175 mi) is District Roads, and the remaining 202 kilometres (126 mi) is feeder roads. Generally, main regional roads and truck roads are passable throughout the year but feeder roads and District roads are traversed with difficulty during rain season.

=== Air Transport ===
Buhigwe has one airstrips located at Biharu. This airstrip is mainly used and maintained by missionaries’ freight.

== Administrative subdivisions ==
As of 2012, Buhigwe District was administratively divided into 20 wards.

=== Wards ===
- Biharu
- Buhigwe (Buhigwe DC)
- Janda (Buhigwe DC)
- Kajana (Buhigwe DC)
- Kibande
- Kilelema
- Mugera
- Muhinda
- Munanila
- Munyegera
- Munzeze
- Muyama
- Mwayaya
- Nyamugali
- Rusaba
- Kinazi

== Geography ==
Buhigwe natural geographical position is characterized by topography, soil fertility, favorable climatic conditions and reliable infrastructures and soon the District will be electrified by thermal power that will make Buhigwe best option for investors. The District council is proud of production in maize, beans, banana and cassava for food crops while coffee, oil palm and ginger is considered to be cash crop and opportunity of establishing sugar cane plantation along Malagarasi River. The topographical and favorable conditions found in Buhigwe may attract tourism activities. The area is characterized by attractive landscapes such as gullies and a number of valleys.

== Economy ==
=== Agriculture ===
Agriculture is the main income-generating activity in the District. Over 85% of the inhabitants depend on crop and animal husbandry. Total arable land is 1,277.796 square kilometres (493.360 sq mi) or 84.9% of the total District area. Out of that, only 50% of the land is actually cultivated, therefore there is a wide room for expansion.

The major farming mechanism in Buhigwe District is based on coffee, maize, bean, banana system in the highlands, maize-tobacco in the low lands and sugar cane and paddy along the river and water streams. Cash crops include Coffee, palm, Cotton, Tobacco, Ginger and Sugar cane while Maize, Cassava, Beans, Banana, Paddy are food crops. Coffee is the major source of income in the highlands and rolling hills area while maize and tobacco are the major sources of income in the lowland areas.

Farming activities are being conducted by using traditional implements such as hand hoes and it is family labor-based which results in low yield per area thus a need to invest in this sector

=== Livestock Production ===
Livestock keeping practiced in Buhigwe District is both traditional and commercial in nature. A large proportion of cattle, goats and sheep are indigenous dominated by pastoralists and agro-pastoralists. The District has about 29,665 cattle, 17,506 goats, 3,893 sheep, 852 pigs, 123,517 chicken and 9,220 ducks. The District is rich of cattle population due favorable weather condition as compared to other District in Kigoma Region. The District is on serious planning in controlling tsetse fly in cooperation with other stakeholder within and outside the District. However, the number and quality of the livestock kept has remained low compared to the high population growth of the District and demand.
