= Kibondo District =

District of Kigoma Region, Tanzania

Kibondo District Wilaya ya Kibondo (Swahili)
- District
- Kibondo District of Kigoma Region
- Coordinates: 4.08°S 31.01°E
- Country: Tanzania
- Region: Kigoma Region
- District: Kibondo District
- Established: 31 December 1983
- Headquarters: Kibondo

Government
  - Type: Council
  - Chairman: Habili Charles Maseke
  - Director: Diocles M. Rutema

Area
  - Total: 8,370 km^{2} (3,230 sq mi)
- Elevation: 1,800 m (5,900 ft)

Population (2016)
  - Total: 287,652
  - Density: 34.4/km^{2} (89.0/sq mi)
- Time zone: EAT
- Postcode: 474xx
- Area code: 028
- Website: District Website

Kibondo District is one of the six districts of Kigoma Region, Tanzania. It is bordered to the north by the Kakonko District, to the east by the Tabora Region, to the south by the Uvinza District, to the west by the Kasulu District and to the northwest by Burundi.

The population of Kibondo District in 2016 was 287,652, from 261,331 in 2012.

== Administrative Divisions ==
Kibondo District us administratively divided 3 divisions, 19 wards, 50 villages, and 420 hamlets. The three divisions are Kibondo, Muhambwe (also known as Mabamba), and Kifura.

=== Wards ===
The 19 Wards of Kibondo District.

- Bitare
- Biturana
- Busagara
- Bunyambo
- Busunzu
- Itaba
- Kagezi
- Kibondo Mjini
- Kitahana
- Kizazi
- Kumsenga
- Kumwambu
- Mabamba
- Misezero
- Mukabuye
- Murungu
- Nyaruyoba
- Rugongwe
- Rusohoko
