= Muhambwe =

Muhambwe Kata ya Muhambwe
- District Division
- Location within Tanzania Location within Africa
- Coordinates: 3.558°S 30.748°E
- Country: Tanzania
- Region: Kigoma Region
- District: Buhigwe District
- Division: Muhambwe

Government
  - MP: Atashasta Justus Nditiye
  - Chairman: Simon Kanguye Kagoli
  - Councilor: Julius Charles Kihuna

Population (2016)
  - Total: 287,652
- Time zone: UTC+3 (EAT)
- Postcode: 474xx

Muhambwe is an administrative division in Kibondo District of Kigoma Region in Tanzania. In 2016 the Tanzania National Bureau of Statistics report there were 287,652 people in the division.
