= Kasulu District =

District of Kigoma Region, Tanzania

Kasulu District Halmashauri ya Wilaya ya Kasulu (Swahili)
- District
- Kasulu District of Kigoma Region
- Coordinates: 4.3794°S 30.3642°E
- Country: Tanzania
- Region: Kigoma Region
- District: Kasulu District
- Established: 1983

Government
  - Type: Council
  - Chairman: Eliya Charles Kagoma
  - Director: Joseph Kashushura Rwiza

Area
  - Total: 5,324 km^{2} (2,056 sq mi)
- Elevation: 1,800 m (5,900 ft)

Population (2022)
  - Total: 537,767
  - Density: 101.0/km^{2} (261.6/sq mi)
- Time zone: EAT
- Postcode: 473xx
- Area code: 028
- Website: District Website

Kasulu District is one of the 8 districts of Kigoma Region, Tanzania. The Kasulu District is the rural district council to the Kasulu Town Council which separated from the Kasulu District Council in 2011. It is bordered to the north by Burundi, to the east by Kibondo District, to the south by Uvinza District, to the west by Kigoma District and to the northwest by Buhigwe District. The district consists of lowland forest, and highland grasslands.

== Demographics ==
In 2016 the Tanzania National Bureau of Statistics report there were 468,679 people in the district, from 425,794 in 2012. There are 240,367 females and 228,312 males in 56,026 households, with an average household size of 7.6 people. Life expectancy was estimated at 61 years in 2012. The largest ethnic groups are the Waha, Wahaya, and Wasukuma tribes.

The Kasulu district hosts several refugee camps, such as Nyarugusu.

== Economy ==
The main economic activity is subsistence farming and small and medium-scale businesses, especially in Kasulu town. There are a few "Wasukuma" ethnic group pastoralists who come into Kasulu with flocks of cattle in search of pastures. They normally purchase pieces of land for settlement for them and their cattle.

== Administrative divisions ==
Kasulu District is administratively divided into 21 wards:

=== Wards ===
The 21 wards of Kasulu District and their population.

- Asante Nyerere (7,950)
- Bugaga (15,853)
- Buhoro (66,175)
- Heru Ushingo (20,050)
- Kagera Nkanda (15,260)
- Kalela (10,511)
- Kigembe (14,600)
- Kitagata Ward (83,775)
- Kitanga (23,040)
- Kurugongo (24,014)
- Kwaga (10,602)
- Makere (32,025)
- Muzye (13,828)
- Msambara
- Nyachenda (15,745)
- Nyakitonto (21,449)
- Nyamidaho(20,034)
- Nyamnyusi (18,179)
- Rungwe Mpya (16,738)
- Rusesa (21,352)
- Shunguliba (4,911)
- Titye (12,589)
