= Kasulu =

Kasulu Town Kasulu Mjini
- District & City
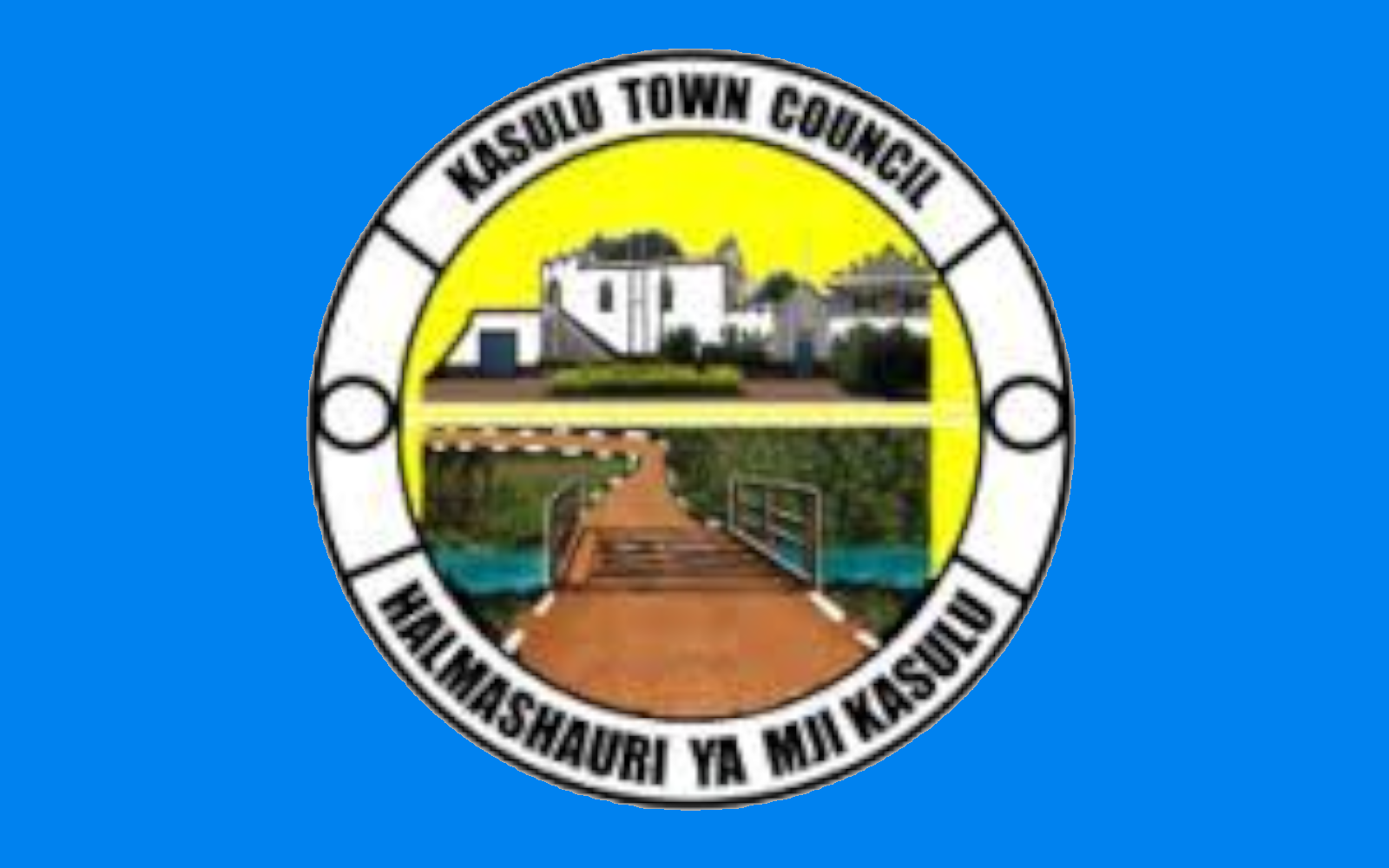
- Flag
- Nickname: Igasulo
- Kasulu Town District of Kigoma Region

- Location within Tanzania
- Coordinates: 04°34′48″S 30°06′00″E
- Country: Tanzania
- Region: Kigoma
- District: Kasulu
- Settled, Urban-ward, Township and Town-council: 1500s, 1972, 2009 and 2011

Government
  - Chairman and Director: Twallib S.Mangu Fatina H.Laay

Area
  - District & City: 911.8 km^{2} (352.0 sq mi)
- Elevation: 1,316 m (4,318 ft)

Population (2022 census)
  - District & City: 238,321
  - Density: 261.4/km^{2} (677.0/sq mi)
  - Urban: 238,321
- Time zone: UTC+3 (EAT)
- Climate: Aw
- Website: Town website

Kasulu Town is the largest city in Kigoma Region, and the fourteenth most populous city in Tanzania with a population of 238,321 as of 2022.

== Location ==
Kasulu is located in northwestern Tanzania, near the international border with the Republic of Burundi. The town lies at the centre of Kasulu District, Kigoma Region. It is located approximately 78 kilometres (48 mi), by road, northeast of Kigoma, the location of the regional headquarters. Kasulu lies approximately 800 kilometres (500 mi), by road, northwest of Dodoma, the capital of Tanzania. The coordinates of the town of Kasulu are:4° 34' 48.00"S, 30° 6' 0.00"E (Latitude:4.5800; Longitude:30.1000).

== Population ==
As of 1988, the population of the town was estimated at 19,324. as per 2012 national census, the population of Kasulu Town counted at 208,244, also in 2015 the population were counted at 224,880, while National Bureau of Statistics (NBS) estimated at 229,218 and 234,783 in 2016 and 2017 respectively. Spoken languages are Kiswahili and Ha.

== Economy ==
The town is the location of the headquarters of Kasulu District Administration. Agriculture is the main income-generating activity in the Council. Over 85% of inhabitants depend on crop and animal husbandry, while the remaining percentage depends on other economic activities such as Small and medium enterprise businesses (SMEs). The main food crops are maize, beans, cassava, sweet potatoes and banana. The main cash crops include coffee, tobacco and sugar cane. The per capita income of each individual in the council is estimated at Tshs. 685, 000/= per annum. Industrial contribution to the GDP of Kasulu Town is very minimal due to very little investment.

== Government ==
In 2011 Kasulu township became a town council. The highest decision body in Kasulu town is the Town Council under the leadership of the council chairman and town council director.

== Administrative divisions ==
Kasulu Town is administratively equal to a district and is divided into 2 divisions, 15 urban-level wards and 108 sub-ward (mitaa). Even though approximately every ward has its own centre, the real central business district (CBD) lies between Kumsenga and Murubona urban wards.

=== Wards ===
The 15 Wards and their population in 2016.

- Heru Juu (16,982)
- Kigondo (18,150)
- Kimobwa (3,744)
- Kumnyika (12,429)
- Kumsenga (14,811)
- Msambara (24,646)
- Muganza (16,003)
- Muhunga (19,160)
- Murubona (23,522)
- Murufiti (10,451)
- Murusi (17,510)
- Mwilamvya (6,250)
- Nyansha (14,756)
- Nyumbigwa (12,811)
- Ruhita (17,991)
