= Atashasta Justus Nditiye =

Tanzanian politician (1969–2021)

Honourable Atashasta J. Nditiye MP

Deputy Minister for Ministry of Works, Transport and Communication
- In office October 2015 – 2020
- President: John Magufuli
- Minister: Professor Makame Mbarawa

Member of Parliament
- In office 2015 – 12 February 2021
- Constituency: Muhambwe

Personal details
- Born: 17 October 1969
- Died: 12 February 2021 (aged 51) Dodoma, Tanzania
- Cause of death: Traffic collision
- Party: CCM
- Education: Dar es Salaam Institute of Technology (Bachelor in Engineering of Electronics and Telecommunication); University of Dar es Salaam (Master of Business Administration)

Atashasta Justus Nditiye (17 October 1969 – 12 February 2021) was a Tanzanian politician who had been involved in the industry since 1990 and had been a member of the ruling party Chama Cha Mapinduzi (CCM) to date. At the time of his death he was the Deputy Minister for Works, Transport and Communication Responsible for Communication and a Member of Parliament.

== Background and education ==
Nditiye started his schooling at Kabwigwa Primary School from 1975 to 1981, Dar es Salaam Technical College from 1984 to 1986 where he was awarded a certificate of General Course in Engineering, a Full Technician Certificate from 1987 to 1990 of Dar es Salaam Technical College, London School of management from 2003 to 2004 where he was awarded a certificate in Computer Repair, from 2005 to 2008 a Bachelor in Engineering of Electronics and Telecommunications at the Dar es Salaam Institute of Technology and a master's degree (MBA) at the Dar es Salaam University from 2011 to 2013.

== Working experience ==
Nditiye was first employed by the National Vocational Training Center in Kigoma Region branch as an Assistant Inter (Electrical) from 1991 to 1992, NIC (T) Limited, HQ from 1992 to 1995 where he was employed as an Electrical Technician Class (II). In 1995 to 2000, Atashasta Justus Nditiye was promoted to a head of Maintenance Team in the Estate Department NIC (T) Limited HQ, Acting Manager of the NIC (T) Limited HQ from 2000 to 2003. In 2004 engineer Atashasta Justus Nditiye was officially appointed an Assistant Technician and Estate manager where he served until 2008 before being appointed to the new post as a Senior administrative Officer from 2008 to 2010. From 2009 to 2010 he worked as a Telecommunication Engineer at the Radio Mlimani and in year 2010 Atashasta Justus Nditiye was appointed to the post of Technical Director for the Association of Southern Electrical Contractors.

== Political career ==
Nditiye became involved in politics while he was at Dar es Salaam Technical College from 1990. And he was a Member of Chama Cha Mapinduzi. In 2017 Atashasta Justus Nditiye was appointed by the President of the United Republic of Tanzania John Magufuli to the position of Deputy Minister for Works, Transport and Communication assisting Professor Makame Mbarawa the Minister of Works.

In 2015, he was elected to the Tanzanian Parliament, representing the Muhambwe constituency. He was named a deputy Minister in the Government of Tanzania in 2017.

== Death ==
Nditiye died at age 51 on 12 February 2021 at a hospital in Dodoma from injuries sustained in a traffic collision.
