= Kigoma Region =

Region of Tanzania

Kigoma Region Mkoa wa Kigoma (Swahili)
- Region
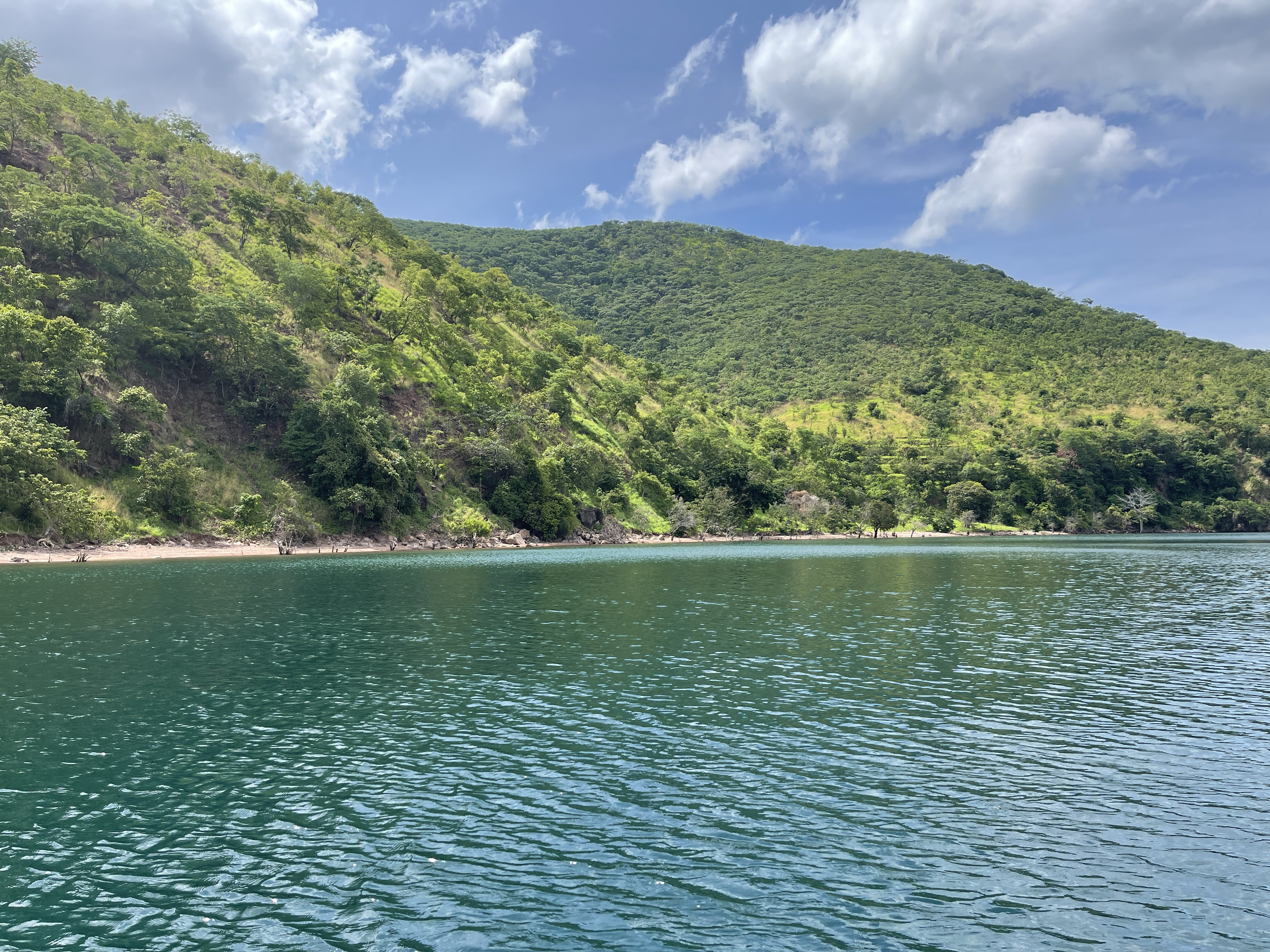
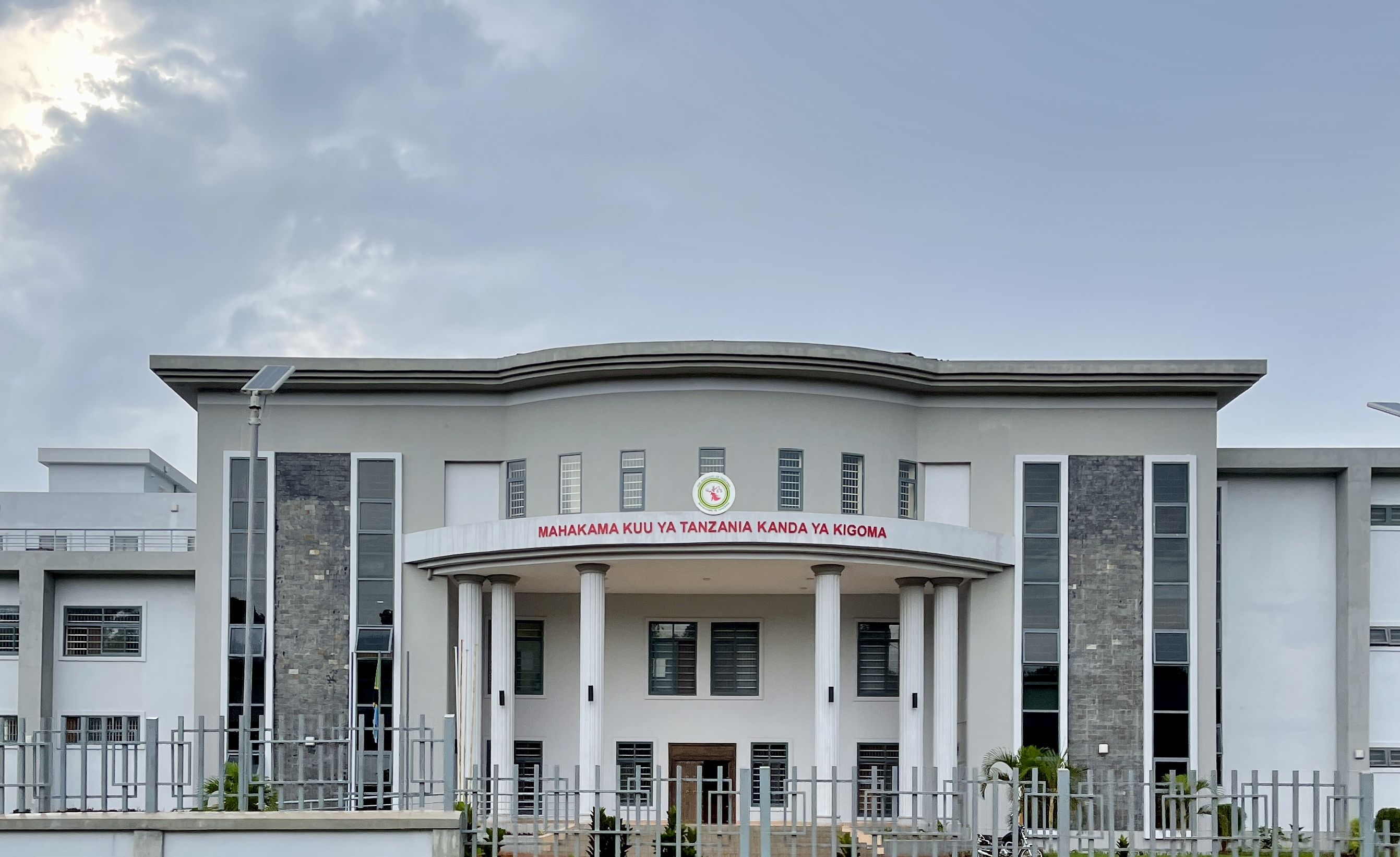
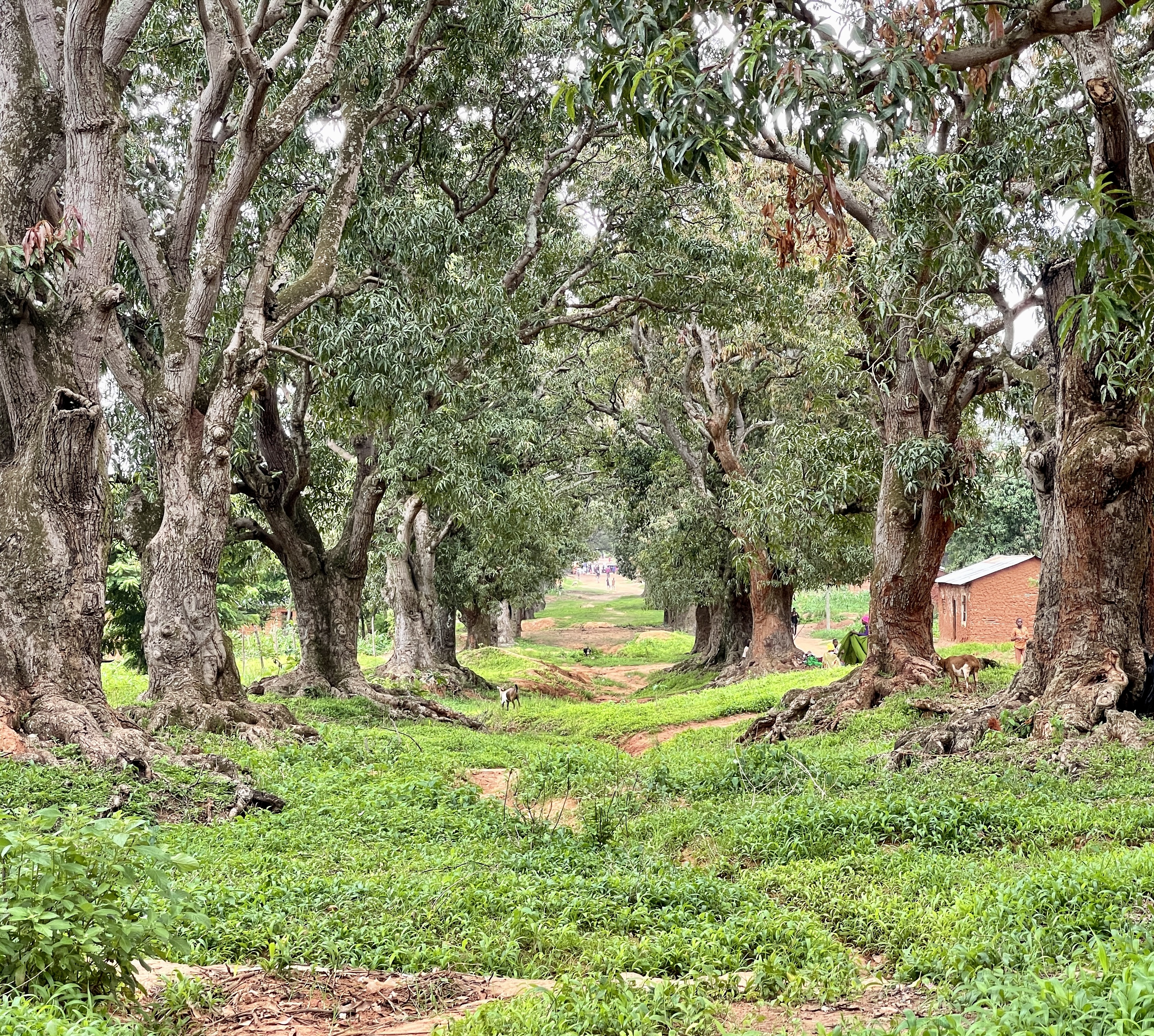
- From top to bottom: Lake Tanganyika in Kagongo Ward, Kigoma District, Kigoma High Court and Mango row in historic Ujiji
- Nickname: Tanzania's Sunset Region
- Location in Tanzania
- Coordinates: 4°52′56.64″S 29°39′41.4″E
- Country: Tanzania
- Zone: Western
- Named for: Kigoma
- Capital: Kigoma
- Districts: List: Kigoma-Ujiji District; Kasulu District; Kasulu Town Council; Buhigwe District; Kakonko District; Kibondo District; Uvinza District; Kigoma District

Government
  - Regional Commissioner: Thobias Andengenye

Area
  - Total: 37,040 km^{2} (14,300 sq mi)
  - Rank: 8th of 31
- Highest elevation (Kicherere): 1,917 m (6,289 ft)

Population (2022)
  - Total: 2,470,967
  - Rank: 10th of 31
  - Density: 66.71/km^{2} (172.8/sq mi)
- Demonym: Kigoman

Ethnic groups
  - Settler: Swahili, Arab, Congolese & Burundians
  - Native: Manyema Ha, Vinza, Tongwe, Jiji & Holoholo
- Time zone: UTC+3 (EAT)
- Postcode: 47xxx
- Area code: 028
- ISO 3166 code: TZ-05
- HDI (2021): 0.520 low · 19th of 25
- Website: Official website
- Symbols of Tanzania
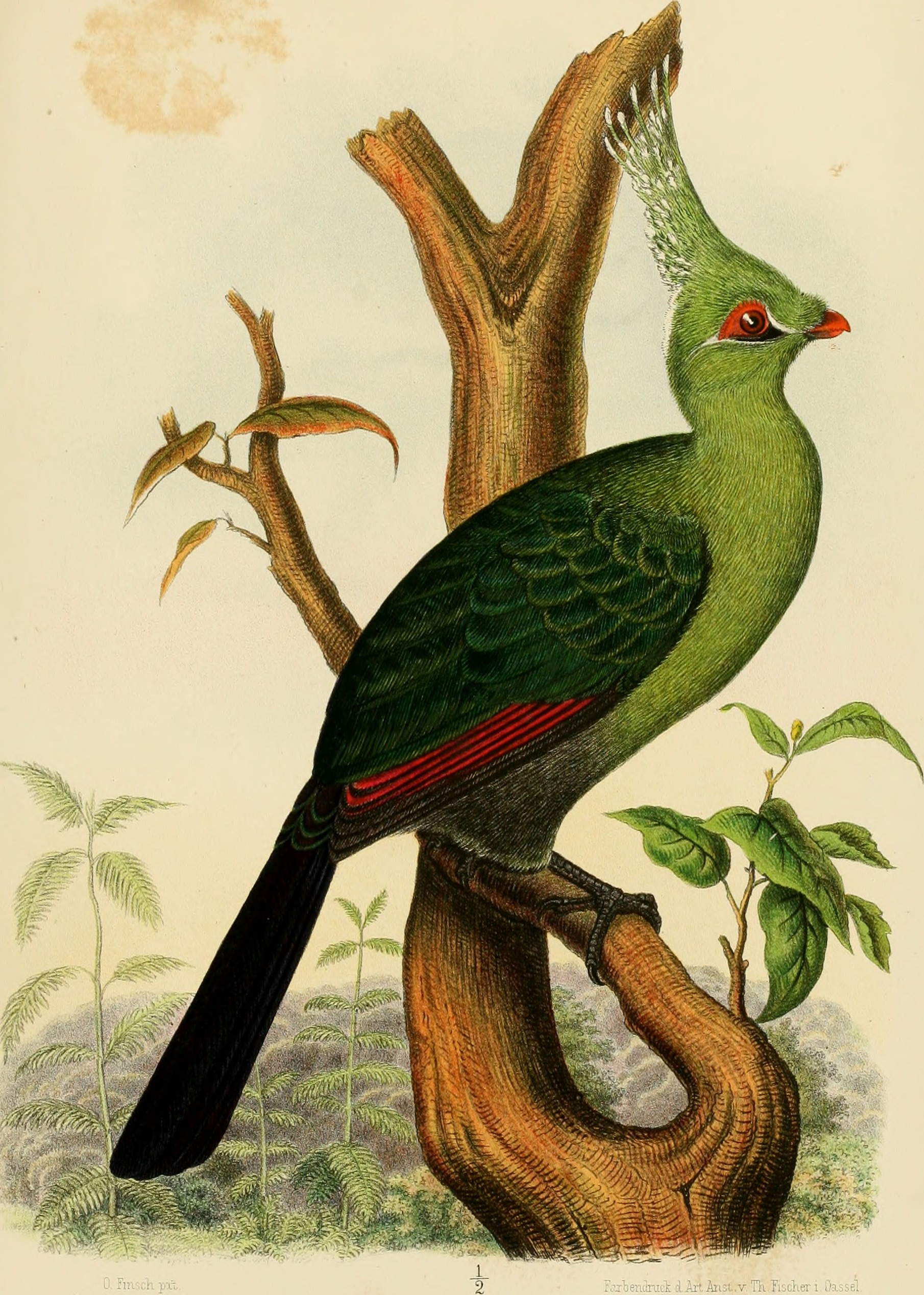
- Bird: Livingstone's turaco

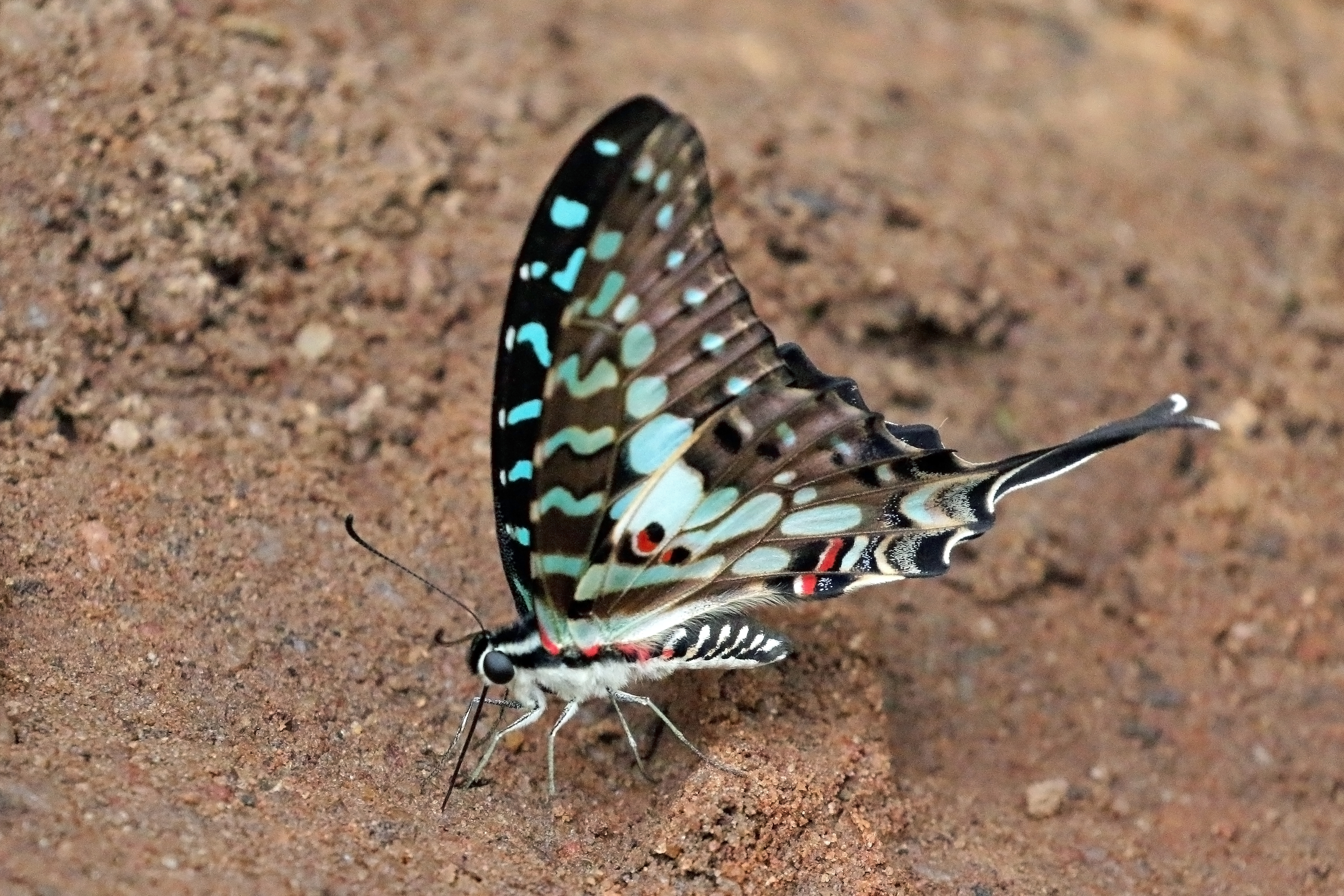
- Butterfly: Large striped swordtail

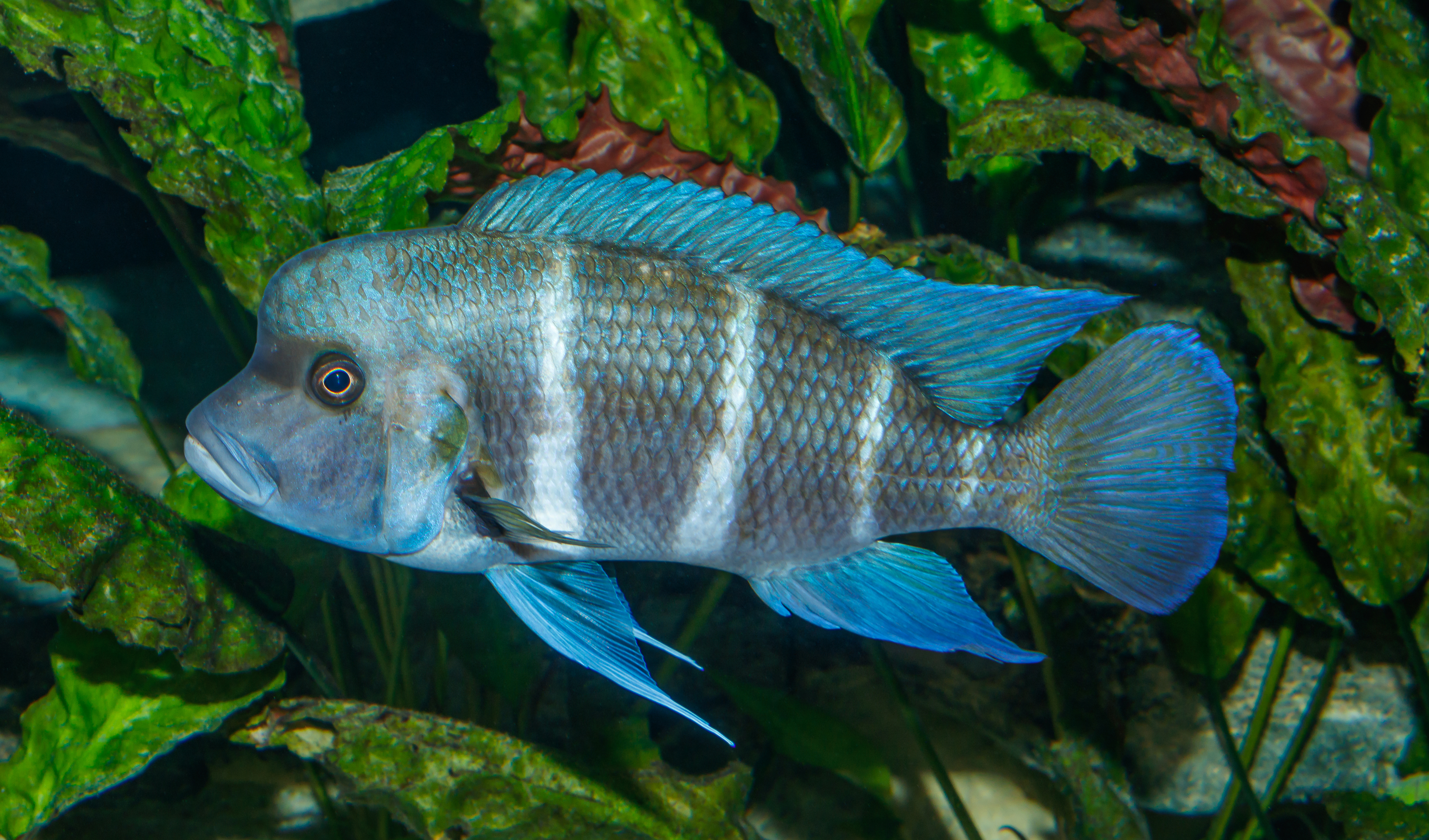
- Fish: Frontosa Kigoma

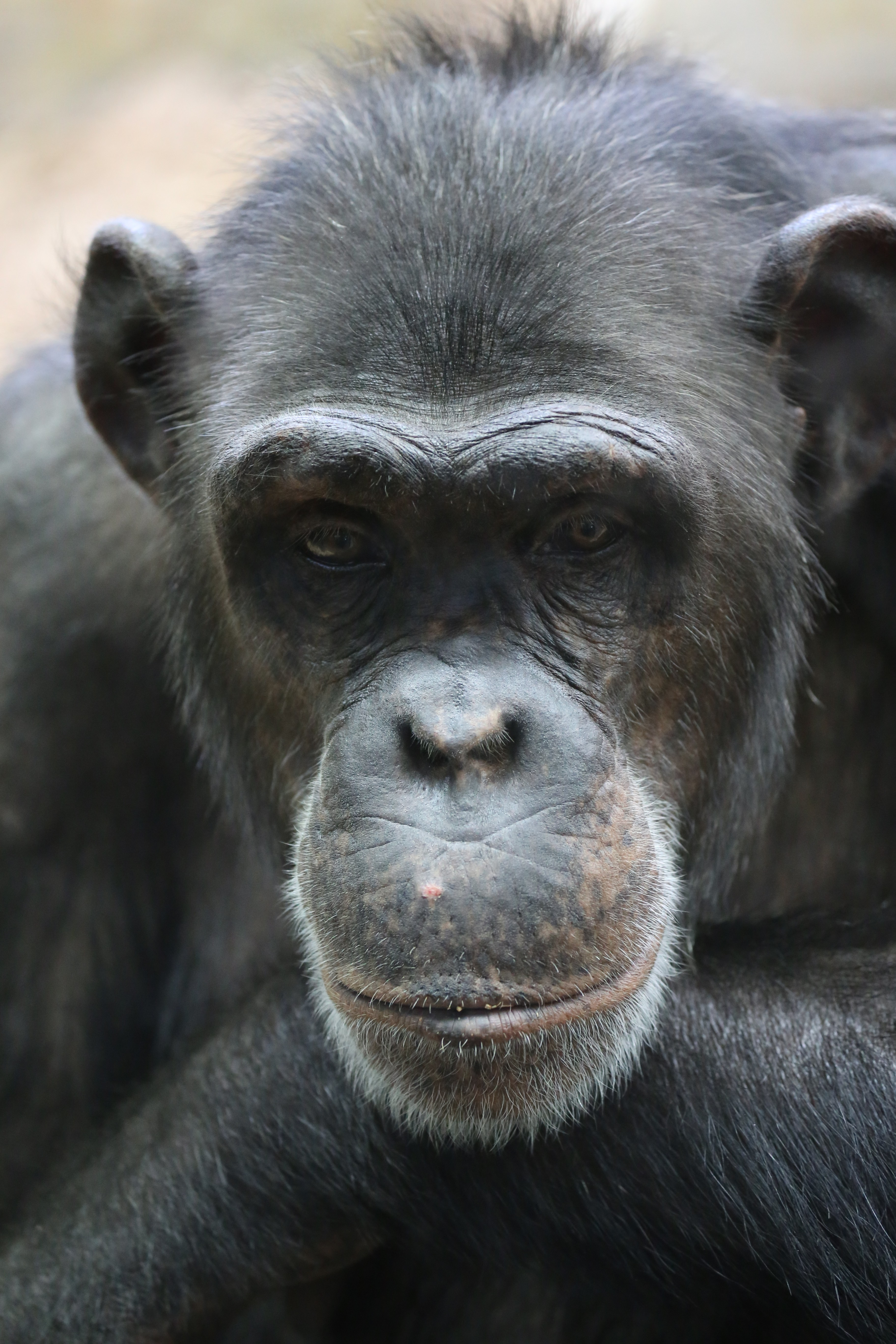
- Mammal: Chimpanzee

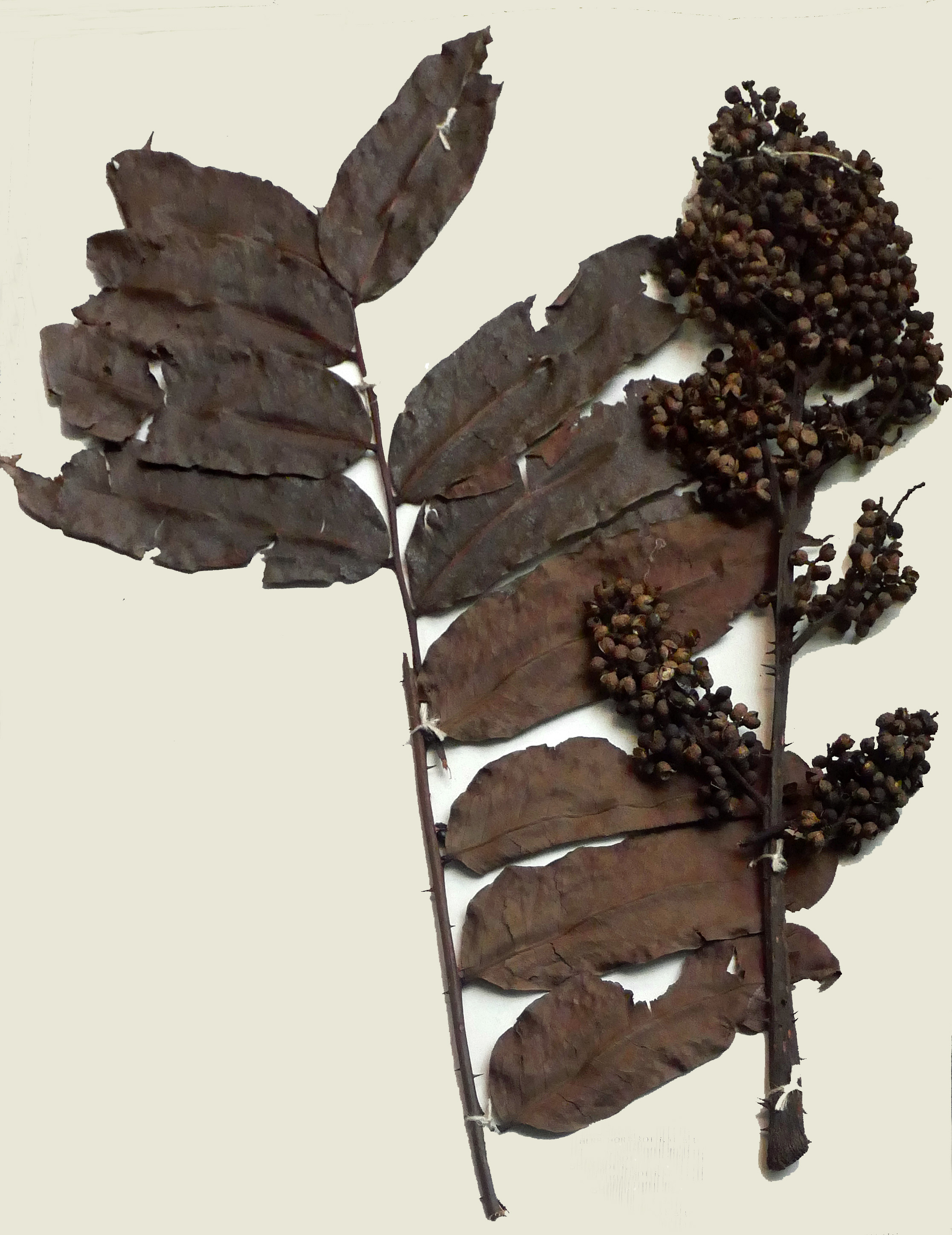
- Tree: East African Satinwood

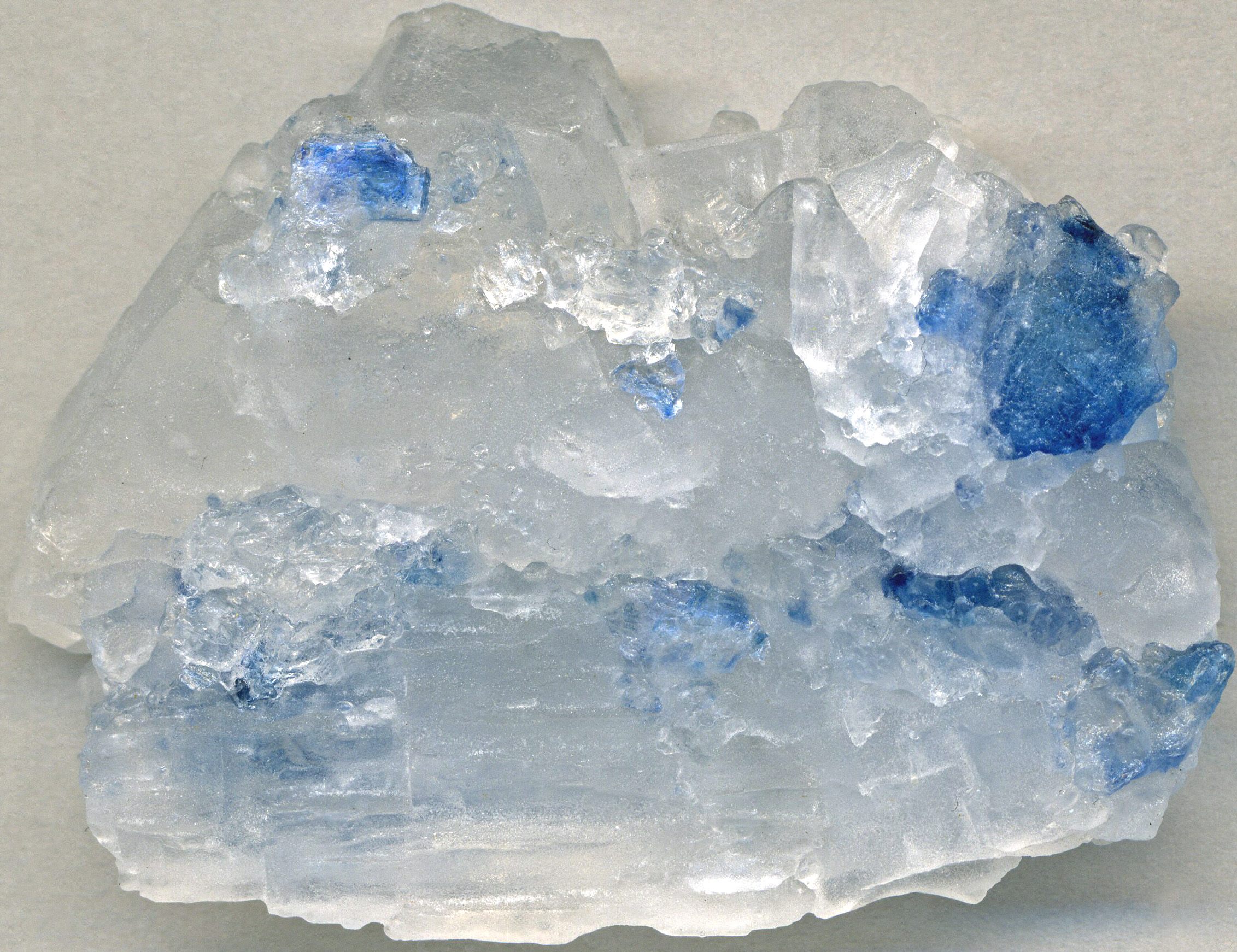
- Mineral: Halite

Kigoma Region (Swahili: Mkoa wa Kigoma) is one of Tanzania's 31 administrative regions, with the city of Kigoma as the regional capital. Kigoma Region borders Kagera Region, Geita Region, Katavi Region, Tabora Region, DRC and Burundi According to the 2012 national census, the region had a population of 2,127,930, which was higher than the pre-census projection of 1,971,332. For 2002–2012, the region's 2.4 percent average annual population growth rate was tied for the fourteenth highest in the country. It was also the sixteenth most densely populated region with 57 people per square kilometer. With a size of 45,066 square kilometres (17,400 mi^{2}), the region is slightly smaller than Estonia (45,227 square kilometres (17,462 mi^{2})).

== Geography ==
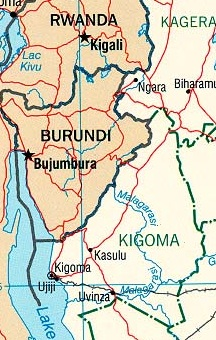
Most of Kigoma Region showing the Malagarasi River.

Kigoma Region resides in the northwestern corner of Tanzania, on the eastern shore of Lake Tanganyika. The region lies at about 5° south and 30° east of Greenwich and is bordered to the north by both Burundi and the Kagera Region. To the east, it is bordered by the Geita Region and Tabora Regions, to the south by the Katavi Region, and to the west by Lake Tanganyika, which forms a border with the Democratic Republic of the Congo.

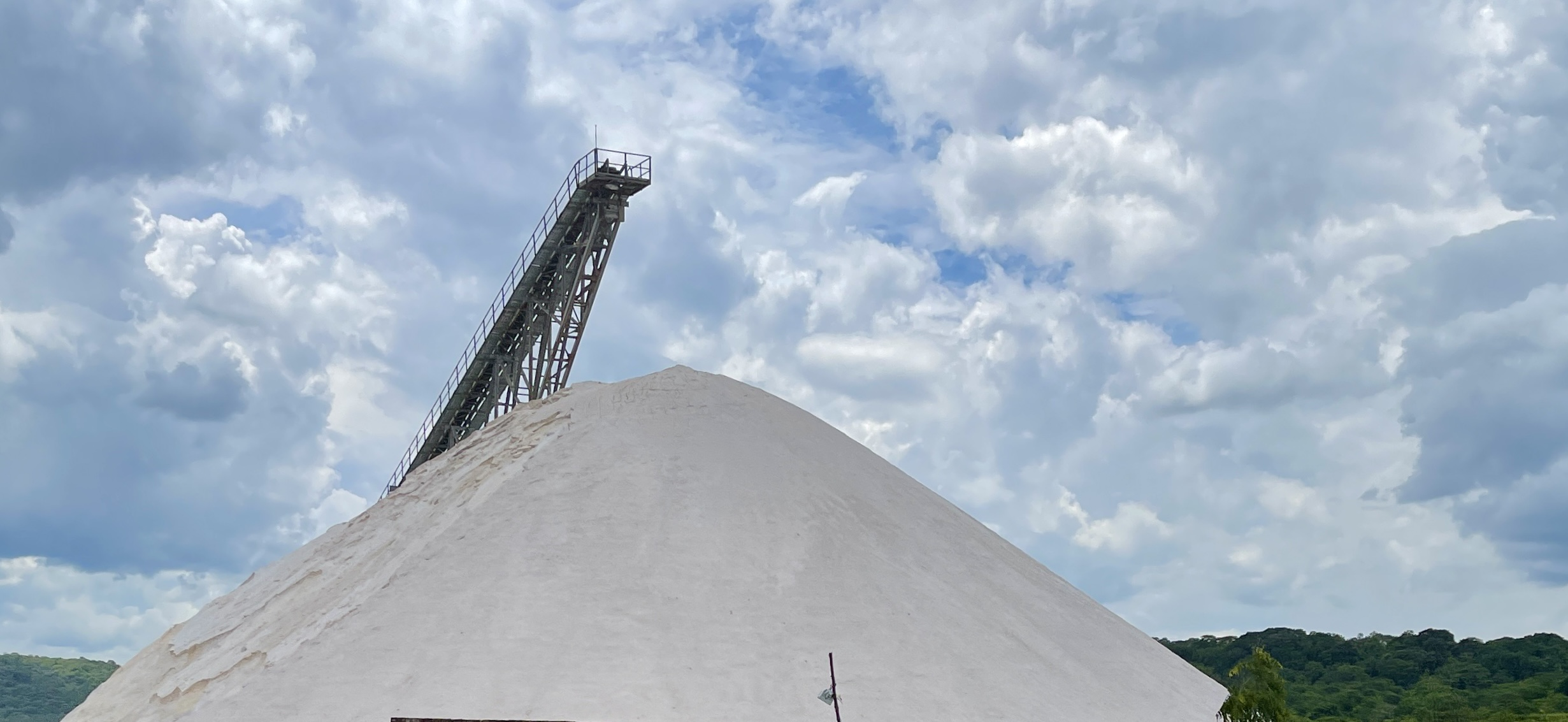
Uvinza Salt mined in Uvinza District.

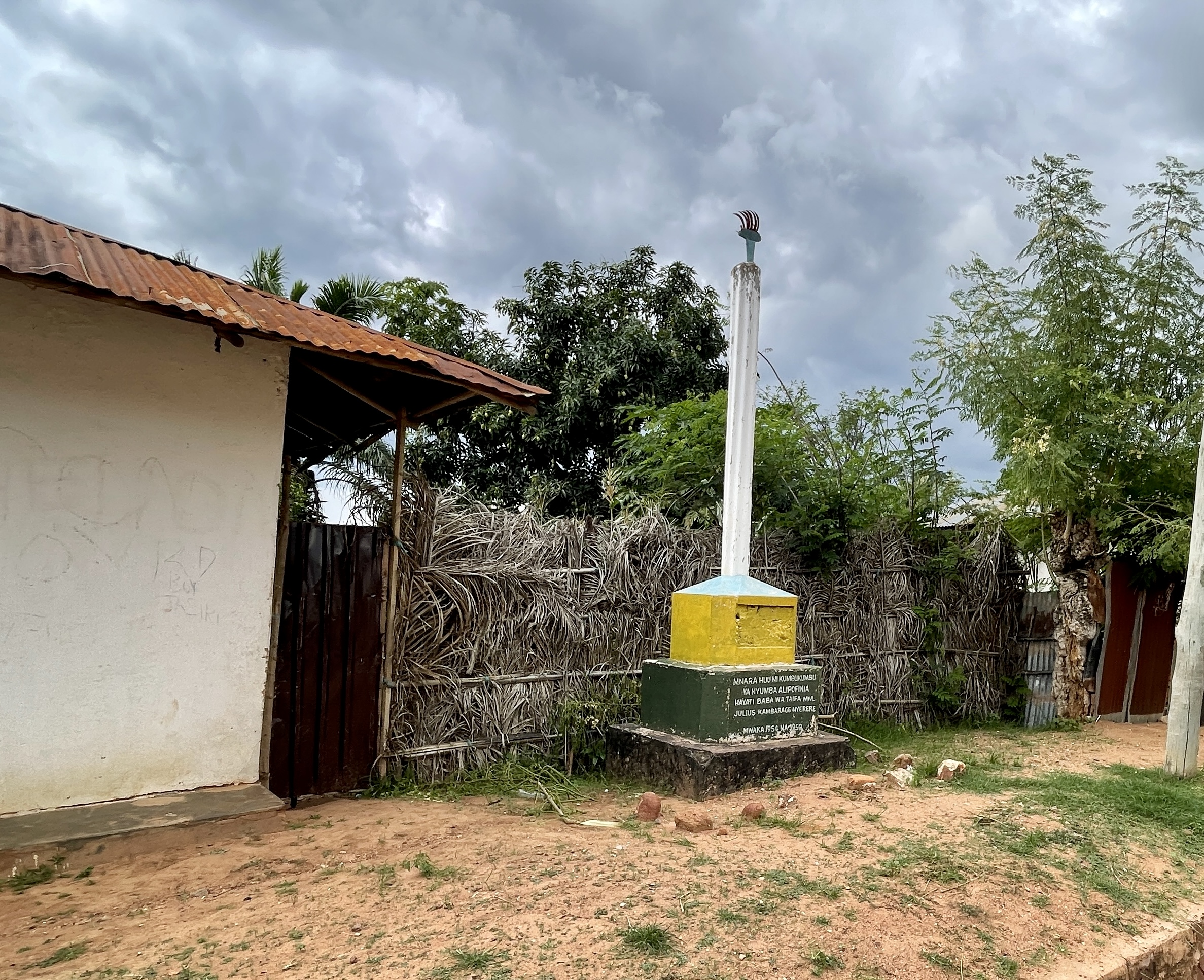
Nyerere's house marker in Kitongoni.

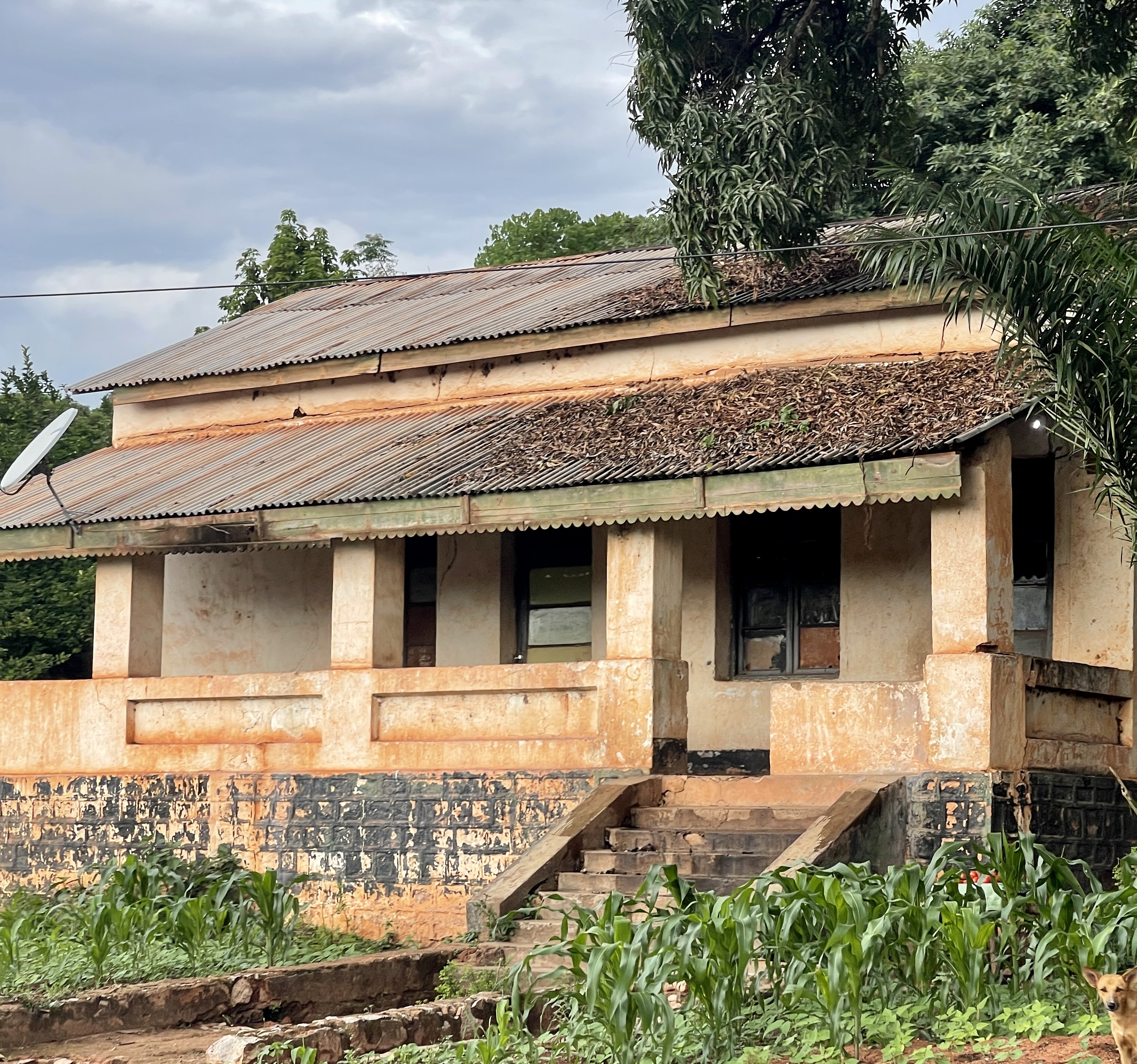
Swahili home in Kigoma.

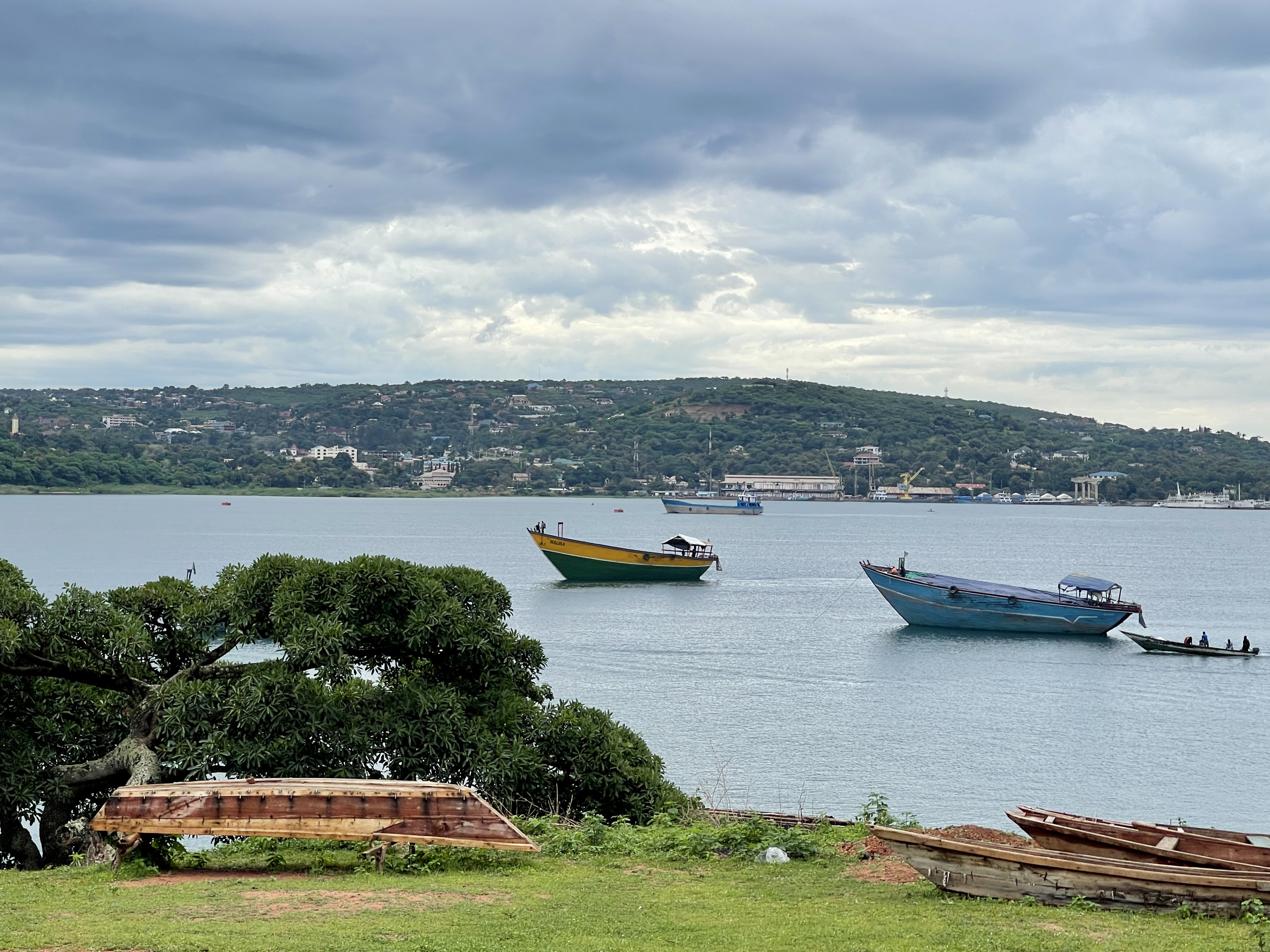
Kigoma harbor from Kibirizi

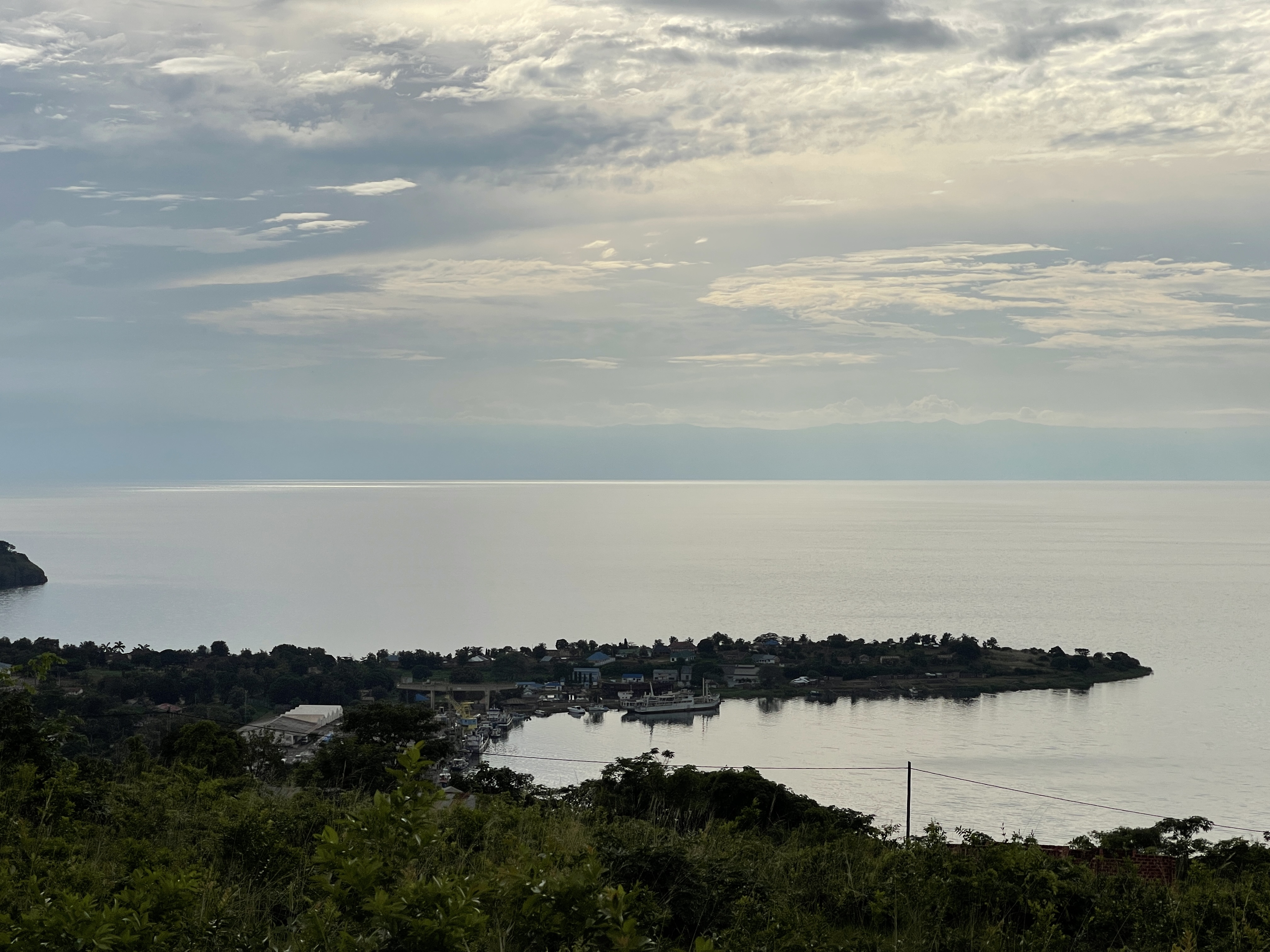
Lake Tanganyika view from Kigoma Ward

The region's total area is 45,066 square kilometres (17,400 sq mi), of which 37,037 square kilometres (14,300 sq mi) is land and 8,029 square kilometres (3,100 sq mi) is water. The region's total area is just 161 square kilometres (62 sq mi) less than that of Estonia. As of 1998, approximately 20,000 square kilometres (7,700 sq mi) was in forests and 12,000 square kilometres (4,600 sq mi) was suitable for grazing or farming.

Kigoma Region is on a plateau that slopes from the northeast at about 1,750 metres (5,740 ft) down to 800 metres (2,600 ft) at the shore of lake Tanganyika. The topography in the north and east is gently rolling hills that gradually become steeper as they get closer to the Albertine Rift margin. The most important river is the Malagarasi, with the Luiche and the Ruchugi being the two other major rivers draining the region.

== History ==
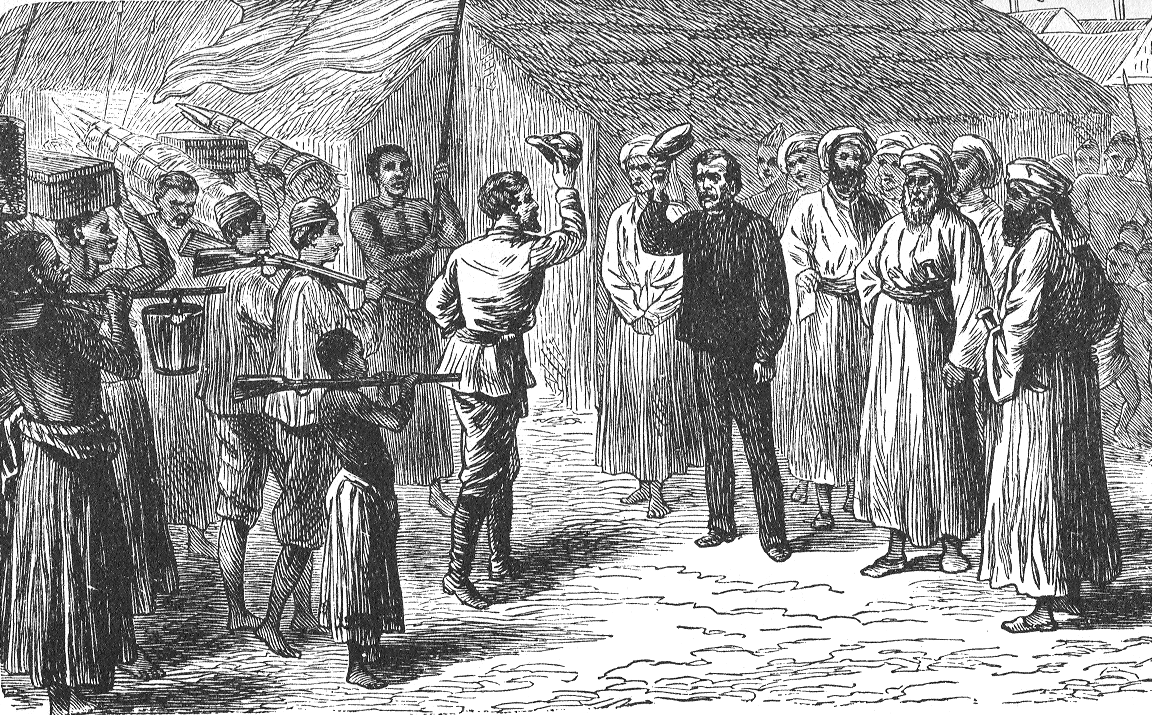
Stanley meeting Livingstone

In precolonial Africa the region was a source of ivory and slaves. Tabora and Ujiji were Arab staging areas for shipments to the coast. It was visited by the early European explorers Richard Burton, John Speke, David Livingstone, and Henry Morton Stanley. In fact, Stanley met Livingstone in Ujiji on the shores of Lake Tanganyika on 27 October 1871. In colonial times, the Kigoma area was known as the Western Region and the capital was Tabora.

== Administrative divisions ==
=== Districts ===
Kigoma Region is divided into six districts, each administered by a council except Kigoma and Kasulu which administered with two council each.:

Districts of Kigoma Region
Map	District		Population (2012)
	Buhigwe District	Buhigwe District Council	254,342
	Kakonko District	Kakonko District Council	167,555
	Kasulu District	Kasulu District Rural Council	425,794
		Kasulu District Urban Council	208,244
	Kibondo District	Kibondo District Council	261,331
	Kigoma District	Kigoma District Rural Council	211,566
		Kigoma-Ujiji Municipal Council	215,458
	Uvinza District	Uvinza District Council	383,640
	Total		2,127,930

== Demographics ==
Kigoma Region has a total population of 2,127,930.

Ha people are the largest ethnic group living here, alongside other significant populations are of the Wabembe, Wamanyema, Watongwe and Wavinza, Sukuma and Haya. Approximately 150,000 refugees from Burundi and almost another 80,000 refugees from the Democratic Republic of Congo reside in three refugee camps in the Kigoma Region, named Nyarugusu, Mtendeli and Nduta.

== Notable people from Kigoma Region ==
- Godfrey Mwakikagile, writer
- Ali Kiba, musician
- Diamond Platnumz, Musician
- Ommy Dimpoz, Musician
- Baba Levo, Musician,Politician
- Zitto Kabwe, Politician
