= Bafumbira =

Ugandan ethnic group

- Kisoro District

Total population
- 713,231

Regions with significant populations
- Uganda

Languages
- Rufumbira, English

Religion
- Christianity and Islam

Related ethnic groups
- Banyarwanda, Barundi and Other Rwanda-Rundi speakers

- Person: Mufumbira
- People: Bafumbira
- Language: (U)Rufumbira
- Country: Bufumbira

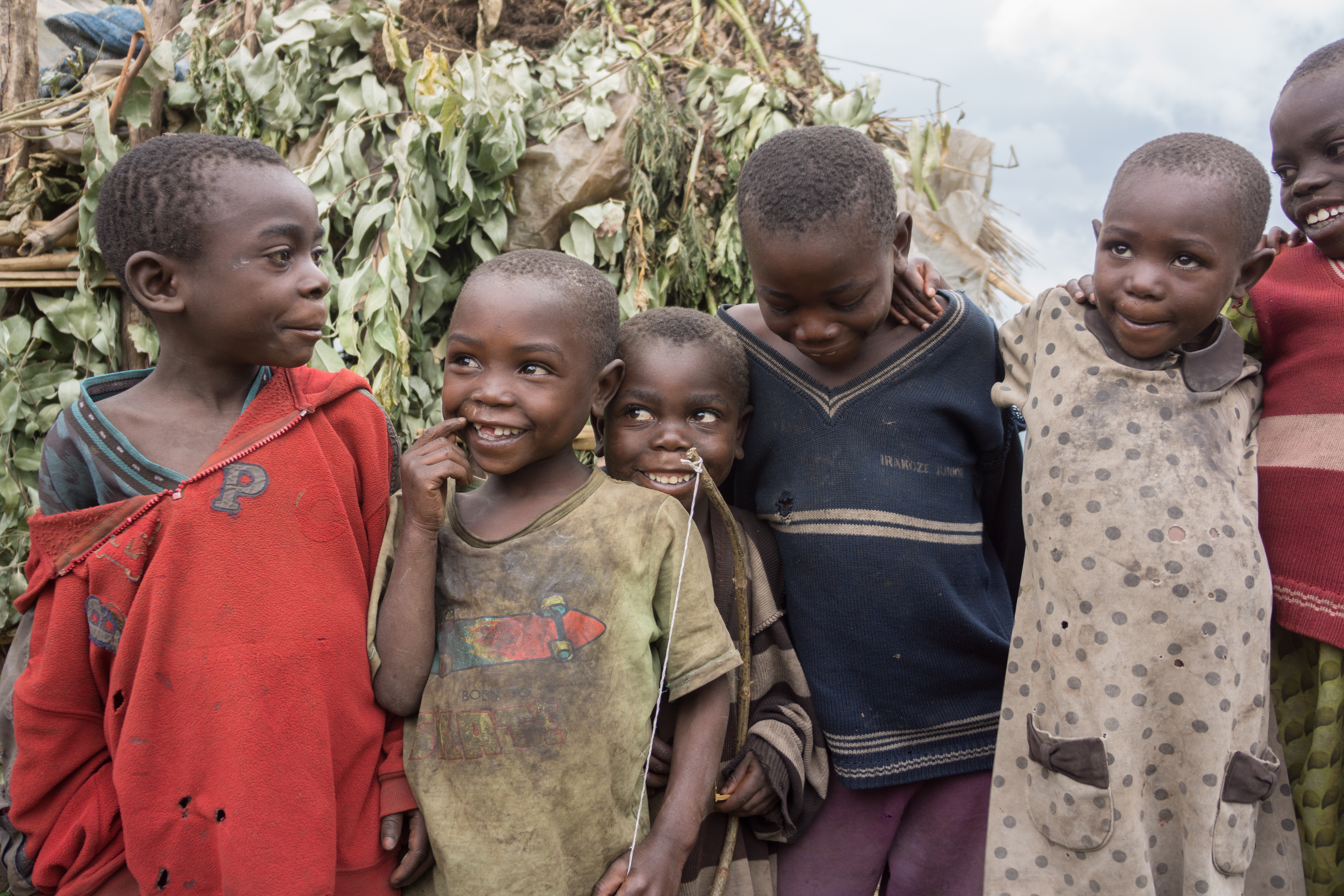
Batwa children - Kisoro, Uganda.

The Bafumbira (ethnonym: Bafumbira; singular Mufumbira), are a Bantu ethnic group from Kisoro District in South Western Uganda. They are of three indigenous groups: Bahutu, Batutsi and Batwa.

== History ==
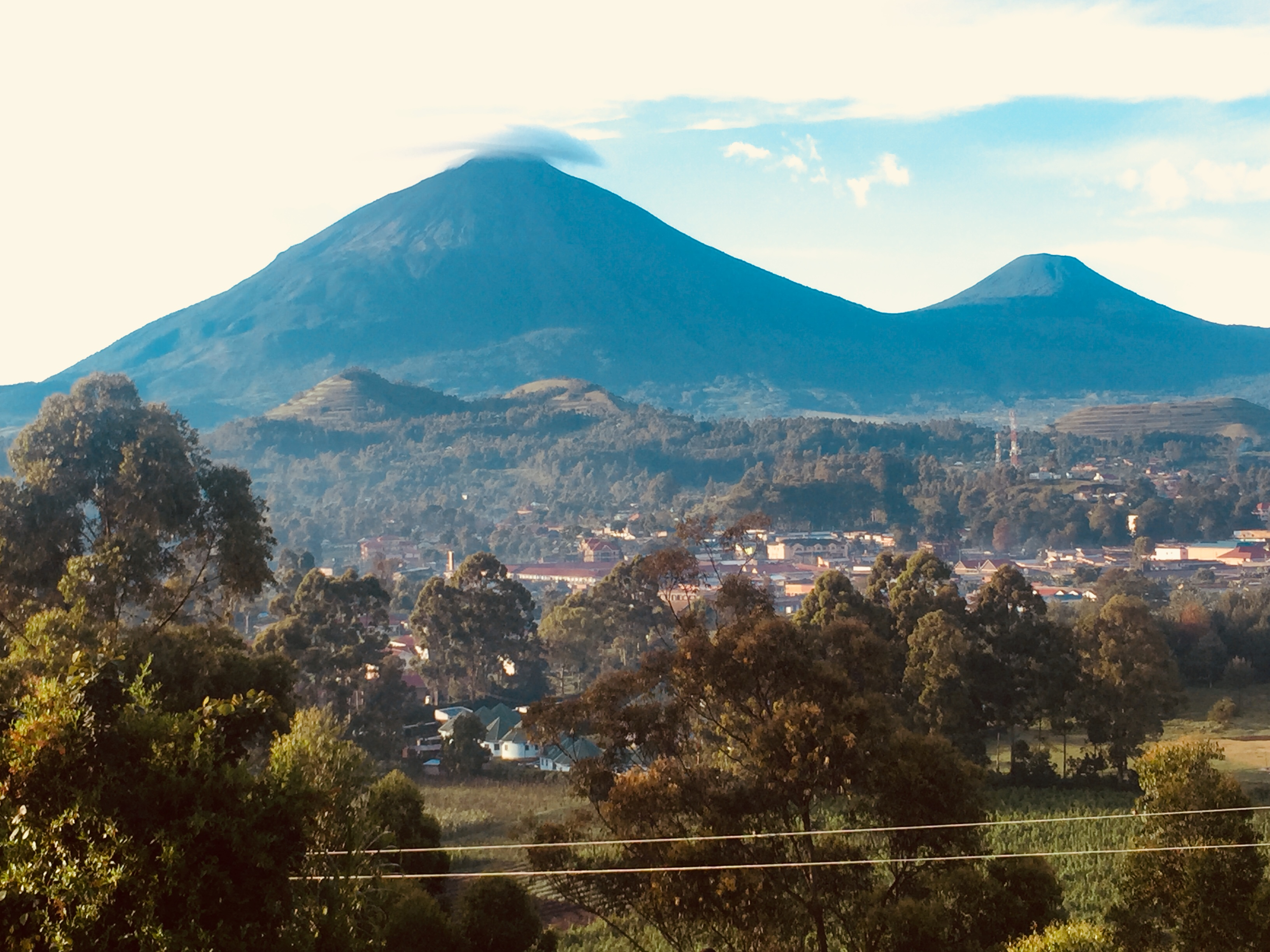
Mountain Muhavura

The Batwa are believed to have been the earliest inhabitants of East Africa together with the Bambuti of Mt.Rwenzori and Ndorobo of Kenya. They do not lead a permanent settled life. The Bahutu are Bantu and are believed to have migrated from the Congo around AD 1000. They entered Rwanda from the northwest. The Origin of Batutsi is part Nilotic/Cushitic assimilated in Bantu. Some say they migrated through Karagwe in northern Tanzania. Others say that their origin could have been either Sudan or Ethiopia. This is because of the Batutsi semblance to the Iraqw people and Masai people. However because of continuous intermarriages there are no clear distinctions between these groups as all live in harmony as Bafumbira. The Bahutu, Batutsi, and Batwa are the three indigenous groups that make up the Bafumbira, they are essentially Banyarwanda and speak Kinyarwanda.

The Bafumbira were part of the Kingdom of Rwanda until 1910 when Kigezi was annexed to Uganda by the colonialists. In Rwanda, they were governed by chiefs who were under the leadership of the Abami. The Mwami used the agency system to govern. He used respected Tutsis and Hutus to govern. Because of extensive agriculture and population growth, Bafumbira migrated in the 1960s to other parts of Uganda for employment, obtained land and made settlements there but have maintained the Rufumbira culture in the areas of; Kamwenge, Kihihi, Bukuya, Kasanda, Mubende, Mityana, Kyazanga, Masaka and Luwero where the Rufumbira language is spoken to date.

== Language ==
The Bafumbira speak a language called "Rufumbira". Rufumbira is a dialect of Kinyarwanda, The difference is in the accents and vocabulary used, as Uganda is an anglophone country and Rwanda was a francophone country.

== Culture ==
=== Clans ===
The Bafumbira are divided into clans. They have eight major clans. The clans were divided along different totems ranging from animals, plants and bird species. Each clan was identified by the hill they occupied. The Bafumbira do not name their children according to these clans. The clans include:

- Abasindi
- Abachaba
- Abasinga
- Abakyondo
- Abazigaba
- Abagahe
- Abagesera
- Abasigi
- Abagiri
- Abagara
- Abarihira
- Abungura
- Abatundu

The clans have subgroups. There are the Basinga under the Bagahe. Today, the Basinga are a clan like any other in Bufumbira.

=== Marriage ===
Marriage among the Bafumbira was organised by the parents of the bride and groom. The boy and girl were not aware of the arrangement to marry until the day of marriage. It was a marriage between strangers. They would meet in a room after the wedding. The bride price was a cow. The parents of the girl would respect those of the boy.

=== Burial ===
Once a Mufumbira died, he or she was buried on the same day of his or her death if they are of a lower class without wealth, if he was of a high class of wealth and or title he would be mourned for at least two days. They would be buried in mats.

=== Naming ===
The Bafumbira named their children depending on a family situation or the circumstances at hand. If a child was born in a period of brewing beer, that child was named "Senzoga". If the birth happened when the father of the child was on a journey, that child was named "Senzira". If there was a lot of food in the household at the time of the birth, the child was named "Nyirabakire".

== Architecture ==
The Bafumbira built huts. The roofs were thatched with sorghum and grass from swamps. The walls were circular and were built with mud and sticks. Today they build brick houses with either iron sheet roofs or tiled roofs.

== Religion ==
All Bafumbira worshipped one god, Imana (Rurema) as an all-loving, creator, provider and judge for all, a moral campus. Nyabingi and Lyangombe biheko were observed as mediums to Imana and received sacrifices in their shrines called indaro.

Today many Bafumbira have adopted Christianity and Islam, with most of them being Christians. According to the 2002 Census of Uganda, 41.5% of Bafumbira are Anglican (Church of Uganda), 37.7% are Roman Catholic, 7.4% are Pentecostal, 5.1% follow other religions, 4.5% are Seventh-day Adventist and 3.4% are Muslim.

== Food ==
The Bafumbira are cultivators. Their staple food is sorghum. sorghum grains can be cooked if harvested fresh or eaten raw if harvested dry. They can also be ground to make flour from which a variety of drinks are prepared. They also grow potatoes that do well in volcanic soils and legumes, mainly beans. The main foods are beans, peas, Irish potatoes, sweet potatoes, maize.
