= Rwanda-Rundi =

Bantu dialect continuum of Rwanda, Burundi, and neighbouring areas

- Region: Rwanda, Burundi, Uganda, Tanzania
- Ethnicity: Hutu, Tutsi, Twa, Ganwa, Ha, Shubi, Hangaza, Vinza
- Native speakers: (20 million cited 2001–2007)
- Language family: Niger–Congo?: Atlantic–Congo; Volta-Congo; Benue–Congo; Bantoid; Southern Bantoid; Bantu; Northeast Bantu; Great Lakes Bantu; Rwanda-Rundi
- Dialects: Kinyarwanda; Rundi (Kirundi); Ha; Shubi; Hangaza; Vinza

Official status
- Official language in: Rwanda (as Kinyarwanda); Burundi (as Kirundi)

Language codes
- ISO 639-3: Variously: kin – Kinyarwanda run – Rundi haq – Ha suj – Shubi han – Hangaza vin – Vinza
- Glottolog: rwan1241

Rwanda-Rundi or West Highlands Kivu is a group of Bantu languages, specifically a dialect continuum, spoken in Central Africa. Two dialects, Kirundi and Kinyarwanda, have been standardized as the national languages of Burundi and Rwanda respectively. These neighbouring dialects are mutually intelligible, but other dialects which are more distant ones may not be. The other dialects are spoken in the Democratic Republic of the Congo (Kinyabwisha in North Kivu), Uganda (Rufumbira, spoken by the Bafumbira in Kisoro District), and Tanzania; Ha, with one million speakers, is the most widely spoken.

== Comparison of Kinyarwanda and Kirundi ==
Kinyarwanda and Kirundi are very similar in many aspects, but differ in several ways as well.

=== Tonal marking ===
Both languages are tonal languages. High and low tones (or H and L) are the essential tones and, having a phonemic distinction on vowel length, when a long vowel changes from a low tone to a high tone it is marked as a rising tone and when a long vowel changes from a high tone to a low tone, it is marked as a falling tone. This is often illustrated in Kirundi in Meeussen's rule. Propositions have also been made that tones can shift by a metrical or rhythmic structure.

Symbol^{1}	Explanation	Kinyarwanda	Kirundi	Part of speech	English (definition)
Plain vowel (a, e, i, o, u)	Short vowel Low tone	(gu)saba		Verb	ask, request
Plain vowel (a, e, i, o, u)	Short vowel Low tone	umugezi		Noun	stream, river
Plain vowel (a, e, i, o, u)	Short vowel Low tone	(gu)shyika	(gu)shika	Verb	arrive
Plain vowel (a, e, i, o, u)	Short vowel Low tone	ikiraro		Noun	bridge
Plain vowel (a, e, i, o, u)	Short vowel Low tone	gusa		Incomparable adjective	only, just
Acute vowel (á, é, í, ó, ú)	Short vowel High tone	inká		Noun	cow
Acute vowel (á, é, í, ó, ú)	Short vowel High tone	intébe		Noun	chair
Acute vowel (á, é, í, ó, ú)	Short vowel High tone	igití		Noun	tree, stick, wood
Acute vowel (á, é, í, ó, ú)	Short vowel High tone	urugó		Noun	yard, corral
Acute vowel (á, é, í, ó, ú)	Short vowel High tone	urutúgu		Noun	shoulder
Circumflex vowel (Kinyarwanda) (â, ê, î, ô, û)	Short vowel High tone	inkâ	inká	Noun	cow
Circumflex vowel (Kinyarwanda) (â, ê, î, ô, û)	Short vowel High tone	intêbe	intébe	Noun	chair
Circumflex vowel (Kinyarwanda) (â, ê, î, ô, û)	Short vowel High tone	igitî	igití	Noun	tree, stick, wood
Circumflex vowel (Kinyarwanda) (â, ê, î, ô, û)	Short vowel High tone	urugô	urugó	Noun	yard, corral
Circumflex vowel (Kinyarwanda) (â, ê, î, ô, û)	Short vowel High tone	urutûgu	urutúgu	Noun	shoulder
Circumflex vowel (Kirundi) (â, ê, î, ô, û)	Short vowel High tone (on the accent vowel in Kinyarwanda)	amáazi	amâzi	Noun	water
Circumflex vowel (Kirundi) (â, ê, î, ô, û)	Short vowel High tone (on the accent vowel in Kinyarwanda)	(gu)téeka	(gu)têka	Verb	cook
Circumflex vowel (Kirundi) (â, ê, î, ô, û)	Short vowel High tone (on the accent vowel in Kinyarwanda)	izíiko	izîko	Noun	hearth
Circumflex vowel (Kirundi) (â, ê, î, ô, û)	Short vowel High tone (on the accent vowel in Kinyarwanda)	(ku)ryóoha	(ku)ryôha	Verb	taste good
Circumflex vowel (Kirundi) (â, ê, î, ô, û)	Short vowel High tone (on the accent vowel in Kinyarwanda)	(gu)kúunda	(gu)kûnda	Verb	love, like
macron vowel (Kirundi only) (ā, ē, ī, ō, ū)	Long vowel Low tone (both letters in low tone in Kinyarwanda)	igisaabo	igisābo	Noun	gourd
macron vowel (Kirundi only) (ā, ē, ī, ō, ū)	Long vowel Low tone (both letters in low tone in Kinyarwanda)	icyeegeera	icēgēra	Noun	plant
macron vowel (Kirundi only) (ā, ē, ī, ō, ū)	Long vowel Low tone (both letters in low tone in Kinyarwanda)	(ku)giisha	(ku)gīsha	Verb	make go
macron vowel (Kirundi only) (ā, ē, ī, ō, ū)	Long vowel Low tone (both letters in low tone in Kinyarwanda)	ingoona	ingōna	Noun	crocodile
macron vowel (Kirundi only) (ā, ē, ī, ō, ū)	Long vowel Low tone (both letters in low tone in Kinyarwanda)	uruuho	urūho	Noun	gourd (utensil)
Caron vowel (Kirundi only) (ǎ, ě, ǐ, ǒ, ǔ)	Long vowel High tone (on the accent vowel in Kinyarwanda)	ububaásha	ububǎsha	Noun	ability
Caron vowel (Kirundi only) (ǎ, ě, ǐ, ǒ, ǔ)	Long vowel High tone (on the accent vowel in Kinyarwanda)	Abeéga	Aběga	Plural noun	Tutsis, Tutsi clan
Caron vowel (Kirundi only) (ǎ, ě, ǐ, ǒ, ǔ)	Long vowel High tone (on the accent vowel in Kinyarwanda)	umuhiígi	umuhǐgi	Noun	hunter
Caron vowel (Kirundi only) (ǎ, ě, ǐ, ǒ, ǔ)	Long vowel High tone (on the accent vowel in Kinyarwanda)	umukoóbwa	umukǒbwa	Noun	girl
Caron vowel (Kirundi only) (ǎ, ě, ǐ, ǒ, ǔ)	Long vowel High tone (on the accent vowel in Kinyarwanda)	umuúnsi	umǔsi	Noun	day, date
Diaeresis vowel (Kirundi only) (ä, ë, ï, ö, ü)	Long vowel High tone	No equivalent tonal pattern	bäkoze	Verb	they did
Diaeresis vowel (Kirundi only) (ä, ë, ï, ö, ü)	Long vowel High tone	No equivalent tonal pattern	mwëse	Noun	all of you
Diaeresis vowel (Kirundi only) (ä, ë, ï, ö, ü)	Long vowel High tone	No equivalent tonal pattern	narï nzi	Verb	I thought, I knew
Diaeresis vowel (Kirundi only) (ä, ë, ï, ö, ü)	Long vowel High tone	No equivalent tonal pattern	böse	Noun	all of them
Diaeresis vowel (Kirundi only) (ä, ë, ï, ö, ü)	Long vowel High tone	No equivalent tonal pattern	warüzi	Verb	you thought, you knew
^{1} These symbols are only used in transcription, for example in a dictionary, but in other forms of writing, plain vowels are used and letters are not doubled (unless if the word itself is spelt in that way).

=== Spelling ===
Formation	Kinyarwanda	Kirundi	Part of speech	English (definition)
c+y	cyane	cane	Adverb	very
c+y	cyanjye	canje	Possessive pronoun, possessive adjective	mine, my
c+y	icyubahiro	icubahiro	Noun	respect
c+y	ntacyo	ntaco	Indefinite pronoun	nothing
j+y	-jya	-ja	Prefix, verb	go
j+y	njyewe	njewe	Object pronoun	me
j+y	yanjye	yanje	Possessive pronoun, possessive adjective	mine, my
sh+y	-shyira	-shira	Prefix, verb	put, place
sh+y	indeshyo	indesho	Noun	height
sh+y	nshya	nsha	Adjective	new
b+y v+y	umubyeyi	umuvyeyi	Noun	parent
b+y v+y	-gorobye	-gorovye	Prefix, verb	became evening
b+y v+y	-ibye	-ivye	Prefix, possessive pronoun, verb	his (multiple objects), stole

=== Word formation ===
There are many instances in which the two speech varieties of both languages have words that are slightly different. However, these differences do not continually recur. One has to memorize such differences as "-anga" in Kinyarwanda in contrast to "-anka" in Kirundi (meaning to dislike or hate), because the shift from "g" to "k" is extremely rare, with proof being words like "inka" (cow), "inkono" (pot) and many other words where "nk" is common in both dialects. Such minor variations involve different consonants, vowels or vowel lengths, tones or affixes.

Summary	Rwanda	Rundi	Part of speech	English (definition)
Consonants	impyisi	imfyisi	Plural noun	hyena, jackal
Consonants	(kw)anga	(kw)anka	Verb	dislike, hate
Consonants	amagambo	amajambo	Plural noun	words
Consonants	umunsi	umusi	Noun	day, date
Consonants	ijosi	izosi	Noun	neck
Vowels	ibiyobe	ibiyoba	Plural noun	peanuts
Vowels	(ku)yogoza	(ku)yogeza	Verb	annihilate
Vowels	(ku)reba	(ku)raba	Verb	see, look
Vowel length	/-riinganira/	/-ringanira/	Prefix, verb	be of equal length
Vowel length	/-pima/	/-piima/	Prefix, verb	measure, weigh
Vowel length	/-sáagura/	/-sáaguura/	Prefix, verb	be in excess
Tone	/umukonó/	/umukóno/	Noun	signature
Tone	/mugufí/	/mugúfi/	Adjective	short
Tone	/ikiguzí/	/ikigúzi/	Noun	price, value
Formation	nyirabukwe	inabukwe	Noun	mother-in-law
Formation	nyirakuru	inakuru	Noun	grandmother^{1}
Mixed	umugati	umukate	Noun	bread
^{1} In both Kinyarwanda and Kirundi, nyogokuru is more commonly used to mean "grandmother".
