= Burundi Bwacu =

National anthem of Burundi

Burundi bwacu
English: Our Burundi
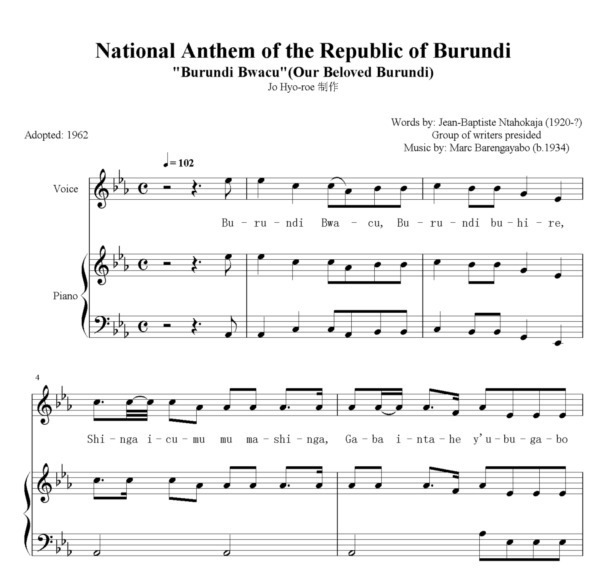
- Sheet music
- National anthem of Burundi
- Lyrics: Jean-Baptiste Ntahokaja and some others
- Music: Marc Barengayabo
- Adopted: 1962

Audio sample
- Instrumental version: file; help

"Burundi bwacu" (Kirundi pronunciation: [buɾúːndi bɡát͡ʃu]; "Our Burundi") is the national anthem of Burundi. Written in the Kirundi language by a group of writers led by Jean-Baptiste Ntahokaja, a Catholic priest, and composed by Marc Barengayabo, it was adopted upon independence in 1962.

== Lyrics ==
Kirundi original

Burundi bwacu, Burundi buhire,
Shinga icumu mu mashinga,
Gaba intahe y'ubugabo ku bugingo.
Warapfunywe ntiwapfuye,
Warahabishijwe ntiwahababuka.
Uhagurukana, uhagurukana, uhagurukana ubugabo urikukira.
Komerwa amashi n'amakungu,
Uhabwe impundu n'abawe,
Isamirane mu mashinga,
isamirane mu mashinga.

Burundi bwacu, ragi rya ba sokuru,
Ramutswa intahe n'ibihugu,
Ufatanije ishaka n'ubuhizi;
Vuza impundu wiganzuye uwakuganza uwakuganza.

Burundi bwacu, mpora mutima kuri twese,
Tugutuye amaboko, umutima n'ubuzima,
Imana yakuduhaye ikudutungire.

Horana ubumwe n'abagabo n'itekane.
Sagwa n'urweze, sagwa n'amahoro meza.

Kirundi original (with tonal diacritics – utwâtuzo)

Burŭndi bwâcu, Burŭndi buhĭre,
Shīnga icúmu mu mashīnga,
Gaba intăhe y'úbugabo ku bugīngo.
Warápfunywe ntiwapfûye,
Waráhabīshijwe ntiwahababuka,
Uhagurukana, uhagurukana, uhagurukana, ubugabo urîkūkira.
Komerwa amáshi n'ámakūngu,
Hābwa impŭndu n'âbâwé,
Isāmírane mu mashīnga,
isāmírane mu mashīnga.

Burŭndi bwâcu, rági ry'ábasôkúru,
Ramutswa intăhe n'íbihúgu,
Ufátanije ishaka n'ubúhizi;
Vuza impŭndu wĭgānzūye uwakúgānza uwakúgānza.

Burŭndi bwâcu, nkóramútima kurí twëse,
Tugutūye amabóko, umutíma n'úbuzima,
Imâna yakúduhāye ikudútūngire.

Horana ubúmwe n'ábagabo n'ítĕkāne.
Sāgwa n'úrwĕze, sāgwa n'ámahóro mēzá.

IPA transcription (Note: See Kirundi § Phonology and Rwanda-Rundi § Tonal marking.)

[bu.ɾúː.ndi bɡá.t͡ʃu bu.ɾúː.ndi bu.híː.ɾe]
[ʃiː.ŋg‿i.t͡ʃú.mu mu ma.ʃiː.ŋga]
[ga.b‿i.nháː.he jú.bu.ga.bo ku bu.giː.ŋgo]
[wa.ɾá.p͡fu.ɲŋwe nhi.wa.p͡fú.je]
[wa.ɾá.ha.biː.ʃi.ʒɡwe nhi.wa.ha.ba.bu.ka]
[u.ha.gu.ɾu.ka.n‿u.ha.gu.ɾu.ka.n‿u.ha.gu.ɾu.ka.n‿u.bu.ga.b‿u.ɾí.kuː.ki.ɾa]
[ko.me.ɾɡw‿a.má.ʃi ná.ma.kuː.ŋgu]
[haː.bɡ‿i.mhúː.ndu ná.bá.w‿]
[‿i.saː.mí.ɾa.ne mu ma.ʃiː.ŋg‿]
[‿i.saː.mí.ɾa.ne mu ma.ʃiː.ŋga]

[bu.ɾúː.ndi bɡá.t͡ʃu ɾá.gi ɾɟá.ba.só.kú.ɾu]
[ɾa.mu.t͡skw‿i.nháː.he ní.bi.hú.g‿]
[u.fá.ta.ni.ʒ‿i.ʃa.ka nu.bú.hi.zi]
[vu.z‿i.mhúː.ndu wíː.gaː.nzuː.j‿u.wa.kú.gaː.nz‿u.wa.kú.gaː.nza]

[bu.ɾúː.ndi bɡá.t͡ʃu ŋxó.ɾa.mú.ti.ma ku.ɾí tkwéː.se]
[tu.gu.tuː.j(e)‿a.ma.bó.ko u.mu.tí.ma nú.bu.zi.ma]
[i.má.na ja.kú.du.haː.je‿i.ku.dú.tuː.ngi.ɾe]

[ho.ɾa.n‿u.bú.mŋe ná.ba.ga.bo ní.téː.kaː.ne]
[saː.gwa nú.ɾɡwéː.ze saː.gwa ná.ma.hó.ɾo meː.zá]

French translation

Cher Burundi, ô doux pays,
Prends place dans le concert des nations.
En tout bien, tout honneur, accédé à l'indépendance.
Mutilé et meurtri, tu es demeuré maître de toi-même.
L'heure venue, tu t'es levé
Et fibrement tu t'es hissé au rang des peuples libres.
Reçois donc le compliment des nations,
Agrée l'hommage de tes enfants.
Qu'à travers l'univers retentisse ton nom,
Qu'à travers l'univers retentisse ton nom.

Cher Burundi, héritage sacré de nos aïeux,
Reconnu digne de te gouverner
Au courage tu allies le sentiment de l'honneur.
Chante la gloire de ta liberté reconquise.

Cher Burundi, digne objet de notre plus tendre armour,
A ton noble service nous vouons nos bras, nos cœurs et nos vies.
Veuille Dieu, qui nous a fait don de toi, te conserver à notre vénération.

Sous l'egide de l'Unité,
Dans la paix, la joie et la prospérité.

English translation

Our Burundi, gentle country,
Take your place in the concert of nations,
Acceding to independence with honourable intentions.
Wounded and bruised, you have remained master of yourself.
When the hour came, you arose,
Lifting yourself proudly into the ranks of free peoples.
Receive, then, the congratulations of the nations
And the homage of your sons and daughters.
May your name ring out through the universe,
May your name ring out through the universe.

Our Burundi, sacred heritage from our forefathers,
Recognised as worthy of self-government,
With your courage you also have a sense of honour.
Sing the glory of liberty conquered again.

Our Burundi, worthy of our tenderest love,
We vow to your noble service our hands and hearts and lives.
May God, who gave you to us, keep you for us to venerate,

Under the shield of unity,
In peace, joy and prosperity.
