= Ha people =

Ethnic group from Kigoma Region, Tanzania

Ha
Waha

Regions with significant populations
- Tanzania: 1.5 Million

Languages
- Ha; Tanzanian English

Religion
- Christianity 60% Islam 40%

Related ethnic groups
- Hangaza, Jiji, Sumbwa & other Bantu peoples

- People: Abaha
- Language: Igiha
- Country: Buha

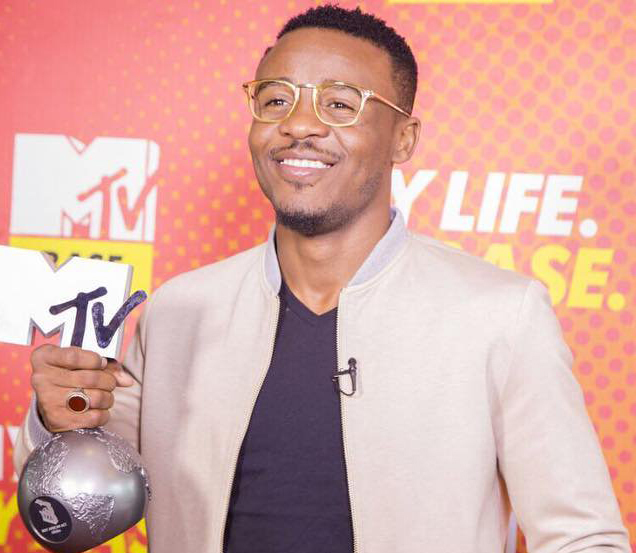
Ali Kiba is a famous Tanzanian musician of Ha descent

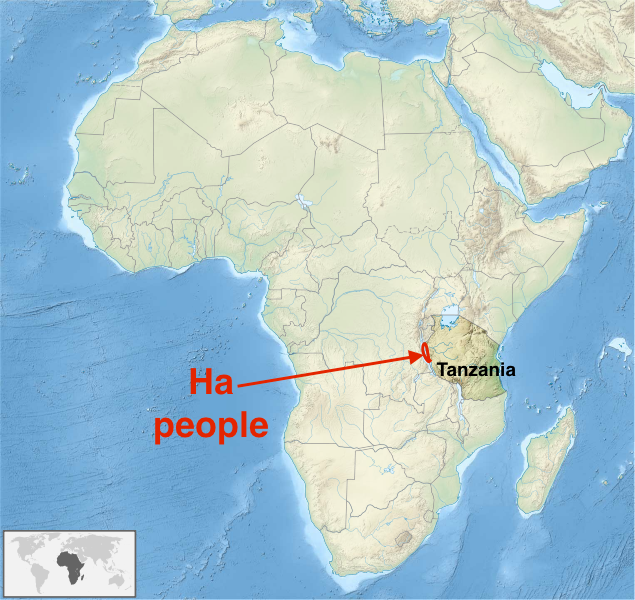
Geographic origins of the Ha people (approx.)

The Ha, also called Abaha (Waha in Swahili), are a Bantu ethnic group found in Kigoma Region in northwestern Tanzania bordering Lake Tanganyika. In 2001, the Ha population was estimated to number between 1 and 1.5 million, making them one of the largest ethnic groups in ethnically diverse Tanzania.

Their language is a Bantu language, and is called the Ha language, also called Kiha, Ikiha or Giha. It is closely related to the Kirundi and Kinyarwanda spoken in neighbouring Burundi and Rwanda, and belongs to the Niger-Congo family of languages.

== Society and culture ==
The Ha people call the lake bordering the area they live in Buha, and the region consists of grasslands and open woodlands. The Ha people share the northwestern part of Tanzania with the Sukuma, the Haya, the Zinza, the Hangaza and the Subi ethnic groups.

The Ha people grow sorghum, millet, corn (maize), cassava, yams, peanuts and other crops. Wherever the tse tse fly problem is minor, the Ha people raise cattle, goats and other livestock that are highly valued in Ha society and gifted at marriage. In the northern parts of their territories, where the tse tse fly problem is significant, they hunt and gather honey.

== Kingdoms ==
Historically, the Ha were considered politically as one tribe, divided into the following small kingdoms based on two districts; Kasulu District: Heru, Kunkanda, Nkalinzi or Manyovu and Bushingo Kingdoms. Kibondo District: Muhambwe Kingdom and Banyingu Kingdom. They use a common language and have similar cultural customs. Bujiji was geographically separated from Kasulu District and became part of Kigoma District. According to the 1948 Tanganyika census, the Ha were the third largest tribe in Tanganyika Territory.

=== Social structure ===
The Ha people live in dispersed homes, typically as a joint family whose male members are related by their lineage. Since about the 18th century, the Tutsi people have lived among the Ha people, but as a small minority (2%), but typically in an aristocratic role. The two ethnic groups substantially share language and culture and there is some intermarriage. The Ha women share some cultural traditions with neighboring ethnic groups, such as wearing the Kitindi, or coiled bracelets made of copper wire worn near the elbow.

The Ha people are animists who revere their ancestors as well as nature spirits. Their traditional religion includes the deity Imana as their supreme being and creator. They have witnessed Islamic missionary activity from the Arabs since the pre-colonial era and Christian missionary activity during the German and British colonial era thereafter from Roman Catholics, Anglicans, Lutherans, and others.

In later years, many men from the Ha people have gone to the Tanzanian coast to work at sisal plantations there.

== Notable Ha people ==
- Ali Kiba
- Philip Isdor Mpango
- Joyce Ndalichako
- Emmanuel Tutuba
- Paul Runangaza Ruzoka
- Peter Serukamba
- David Kafulila
- Christopher Ndizeye Nkoronko
- Moses Machali
- Felix Mkosamali

== Literature ==
- J.H. Scherer, Marriage and Bride-Wealth in the Highlands of Buha (Tanganyika). Diss. Utrecht University, 1965.

== See also ==
- Ha language
