= Western Lakes Bantu languages =

Subgroup of Great Lakes Bantu languages

Western Lakes Bantu
- Geographic distribution: Rwanda, Burundi, Kigoma Region, South Kivu, North Kivu, Kisoro District, Rwenzururu, Kagera Region
- Linguistic classification: Niger–Congo?: Atlantic–Congo; Volta-Congo; Benue–Congo; Bantoid; Southern Bantoid; Bantu; Northeast Bantu; Great Lakes Bantu; Western Lakes Bantu
- Proto-language: Proto-Western Lakes Bantu
- Subdivisions: Kabwari; Kivu; Rwenzori

Language codes
- Glottolog: west2842

The Western Lakes Bantu languages form a subgroup of the Great Lakes Bantu languages spoken in Rwanda, Burundi the DRC, Uganda and Tanzania.

== Classification ==
The Western Lakes Bantu languages are classified within the Glottolog database as follows:

- Kabwari
- Kivu
  - Forest Kivu
    - Fuliiric
      - Fuliiru-Vira
        - Fuliiru
        - Vira (also called Joba)
      - Nyindu
      - Nyindu
    - Hunde-Havu
      - Havu
      - Hunde
    - Shi
    - Tembo
  - West Highlands Kivu
    - Kinyarwanda
    - Rundic
      - Ha
      - Hangaza-Shubi
        - Hangaza
        - Shubi
      - Kirundi
    - Kitwa
    - Vinza
- Rwenzori
  - Konzo
  - Nande

== History ==
Proto-Western Lakes Bantu was developed in 400 AD by those who remained in the original Proto-Great Lakes Bantu homeland, which was in and on the hillsides of the Kivu Rift Valley.

Similar to the Okiek people in Kenya, the Great Lakes Twa played important roles as "outsiders" in the ritual and oral historiographic life of Western Lakes Bantu speaking societies.
