= Shubi =

Shubi may refer to:

- the Shubi people
- the Shubi language
