= Ujiji =

National Historic Site of Tanzania

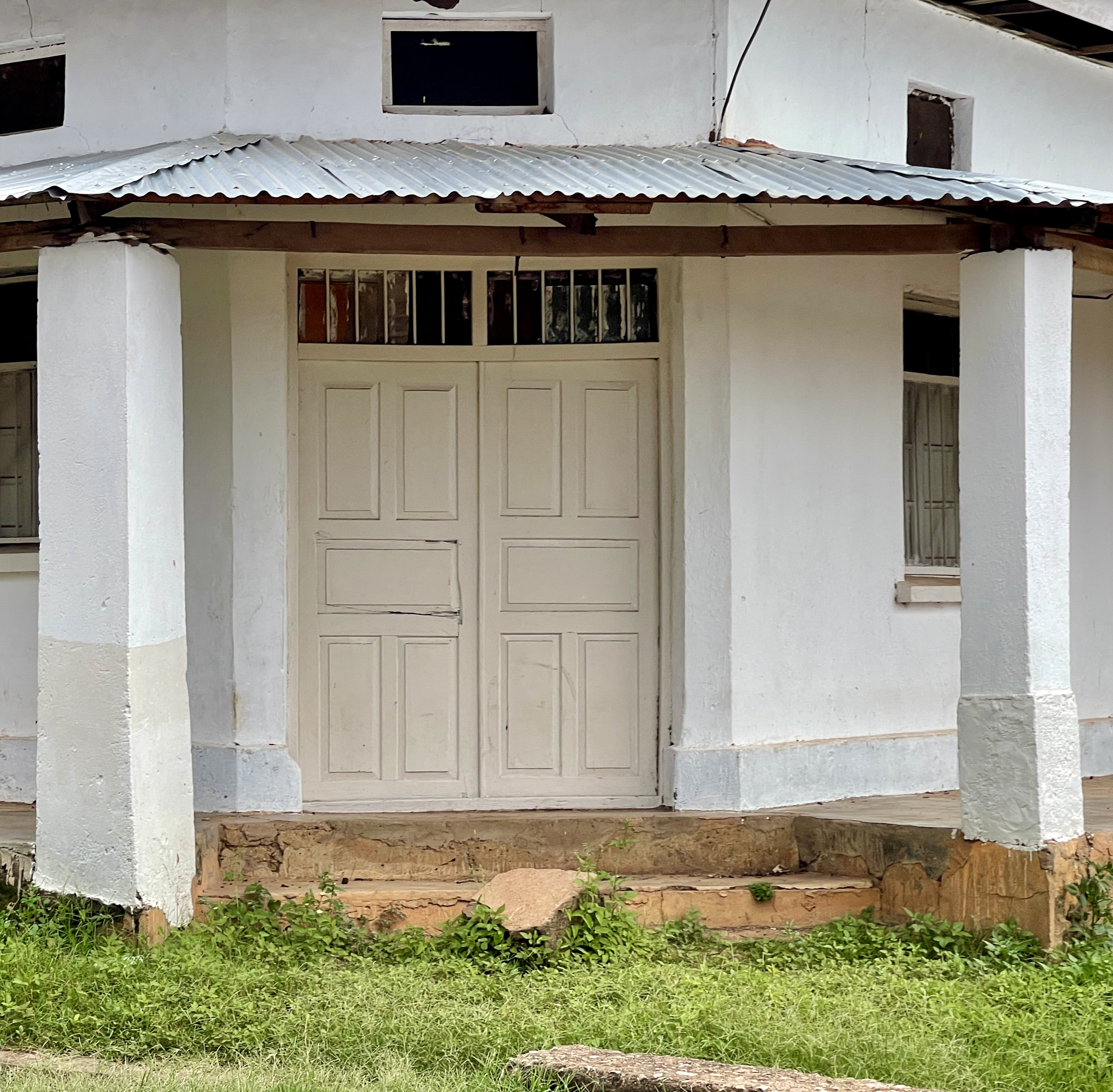
- Swahili house in Ujiji

- Location within Tanzania
- 4°54′40″S 29°40′30″E
- Type: Settlement
- Cultures: Manyema, Jiji, Ha, Swahili and Arab
- Location: Kigoma-Ujiji District, Kigoma Region, Tanzania

History
- Built: 18th Century

Site notes
- Architectural style: Swahili
- Condition: Endangered
- Owner: Tanzanian Government
- Management: Antiquities Division, Ministry of Natural Resources and Tourism

National Historic Sites of Tanzania
- Official name: Ujiji Historic Town
- Type: Cultural

Ujiji is the oldest town in western Tanzania and is located in Kigoma-Ujiji District of Kigoma Region. Originally a Swahili settlement and then an Arab slave trading post by the mid-nineteenth century nominally under the Sultanate of Zanzibar. In 1900, the population was estimated at 10,000 and in 1967 about 41,000. The site is a registered National Historic Site.

== History ==
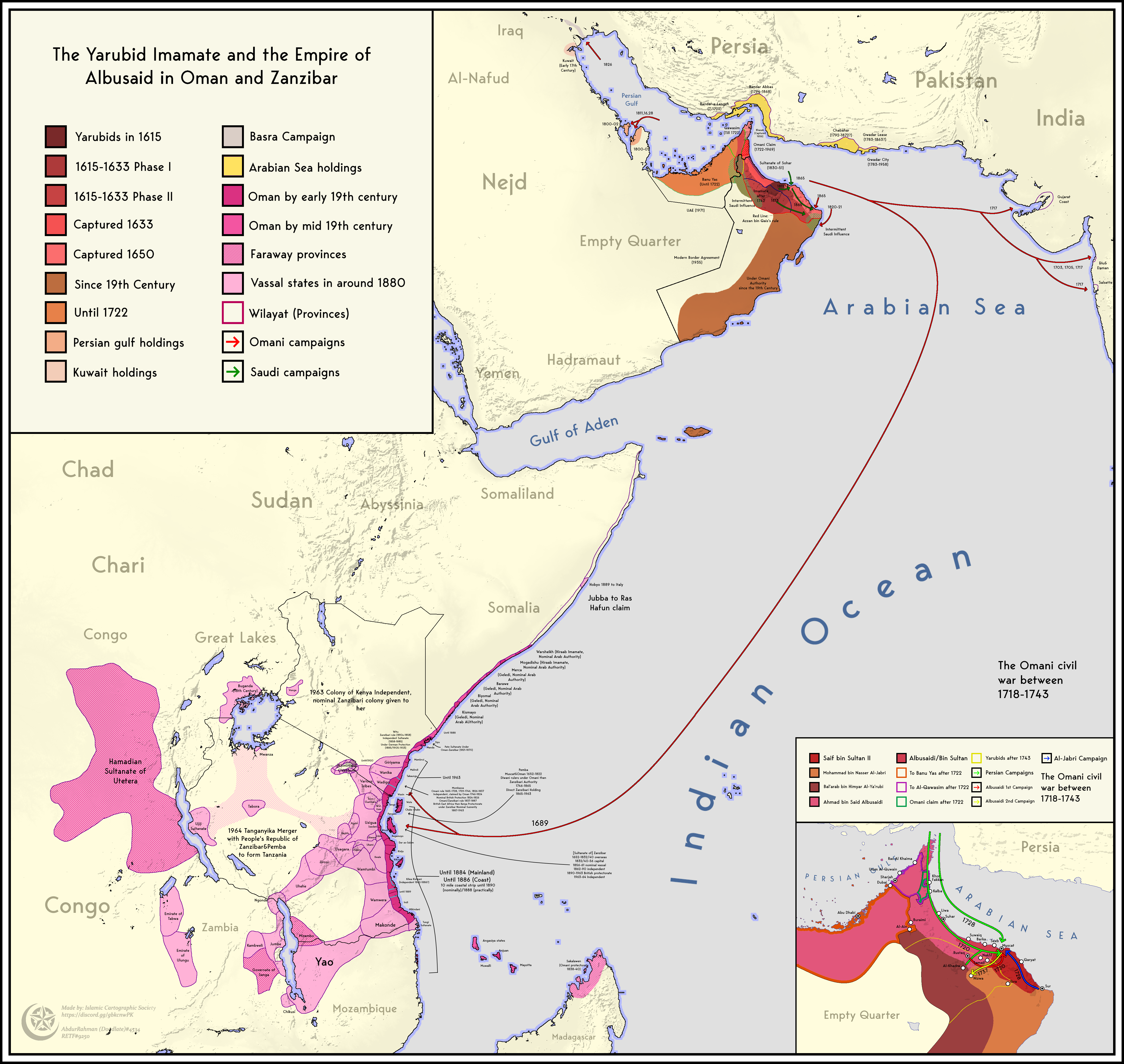
The "Ujiji Sultanate" in the mid-nineteenth century

Historically the town that is now Ujiji was the home of the Jiji people. The settlement has close connections with the Swahili community of Buyenzi north of Lake Tanganyika in Burundi. Ujiji is the place where Richard Burton and John Speke first reached the shore of Lake Tanganyika in 1858. It is the site of the famous meeting on 10 November 1871 when Henry Stanley found Dr. David Livingstone, and reputedly uttered the famous words "Dr. Livingstone, I presume?" Livingstone, whom many thought dead as no news had been heard of him for several years and who had only arrived back in Ujiji the day before, wrote "When my spirits were at their lowest ebb, the good Samaritan was close at hand, for one morning [my servant] Susi came running at the top of his speed and gasped out, 'An Englishman! I see him!' and off he darted to meet him. The American flag at the head of the caravan told of the nationality of the stranger. Bales of goods, baths of tin, huge kettles, cooking pots, tents, etc., made me think, 'This must be a luxurious traveller, and not one at his wits' end like me.'"

A monument known as the "Dr. Livingstone Memorial" was erected in Ujiji to commemorate the meeting. There is also a modest museum. There is a former slave route near the market. In 1878, the London Missionary Society established their first missionary post on the shore of Lake Tanganyika at Ujiji. Some in Burundi claim the location of the famous meeting is a few miles south of the former capital Bujumbura. However, the Livingstone-Stanley Monument in Mugere actually marks a visit the two men made 15 days later on their joint exploration of northern Lake Tanganyika.

== Culture ==
The culture of the people and town overall is Swahili in nature. Most residents are Muslim and of diverse ethnic backgrounds.

== Gallery ==
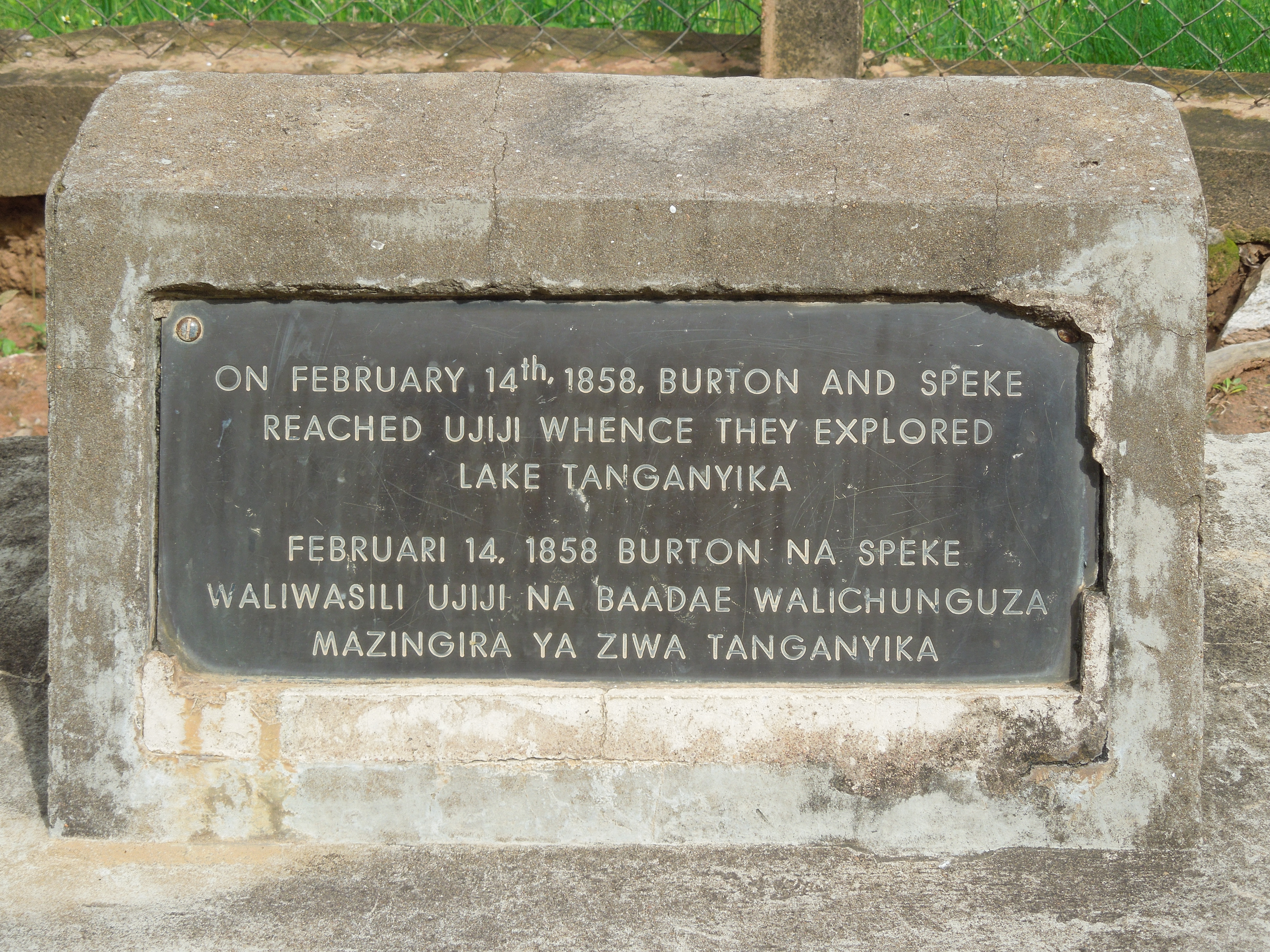
Burton and Speke Monument

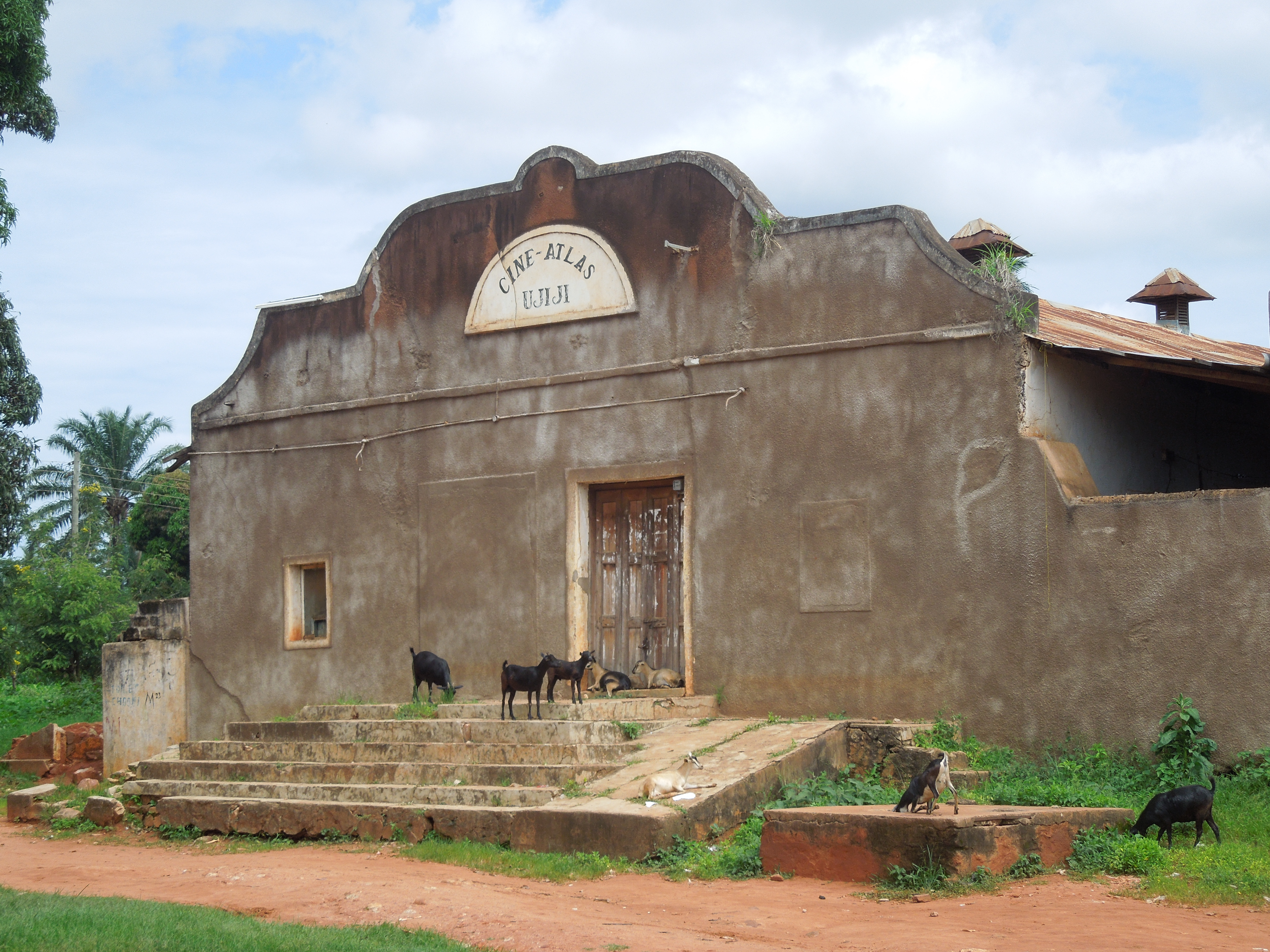
Cine Atlas

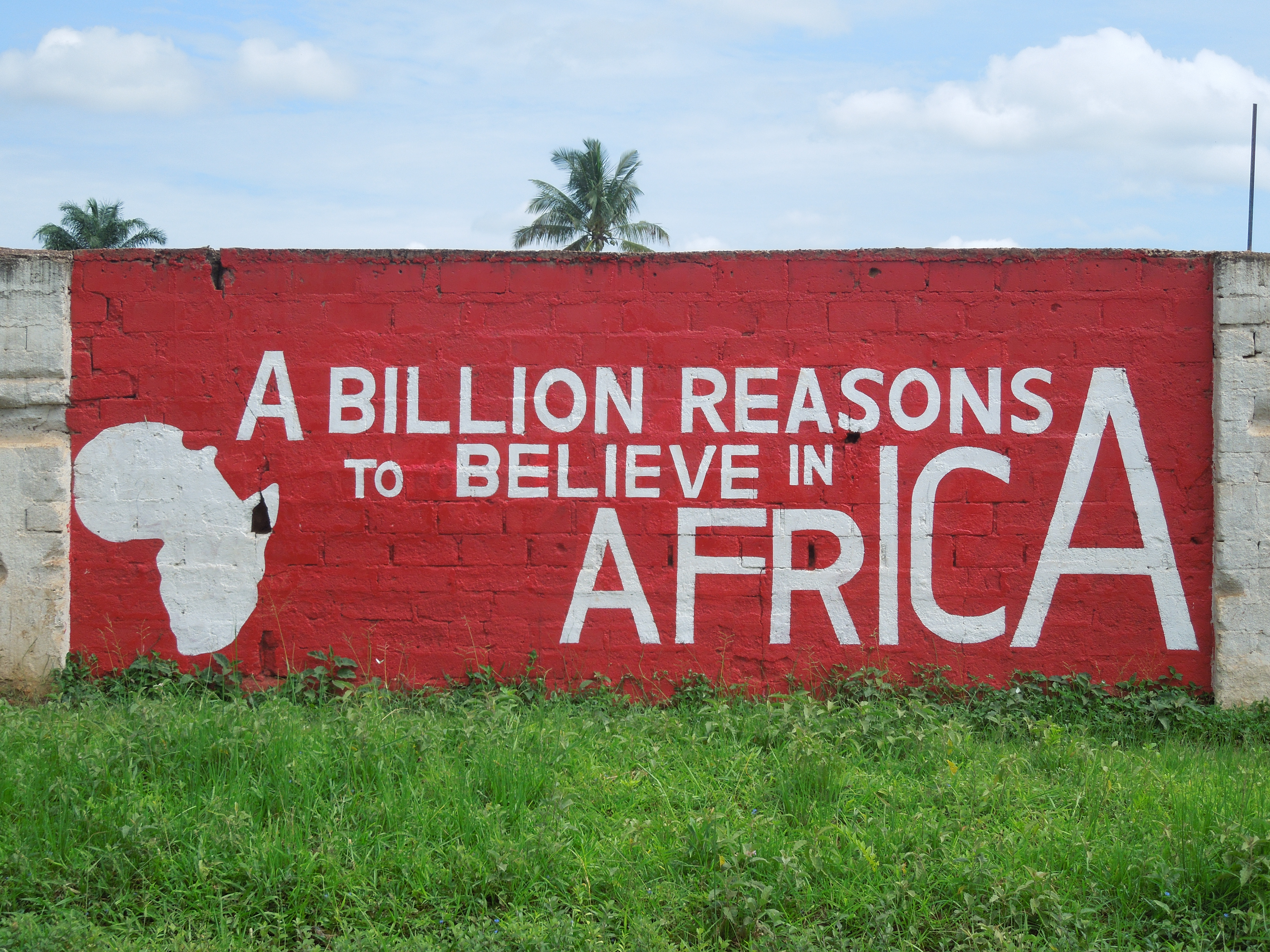
Pan Africanism mural

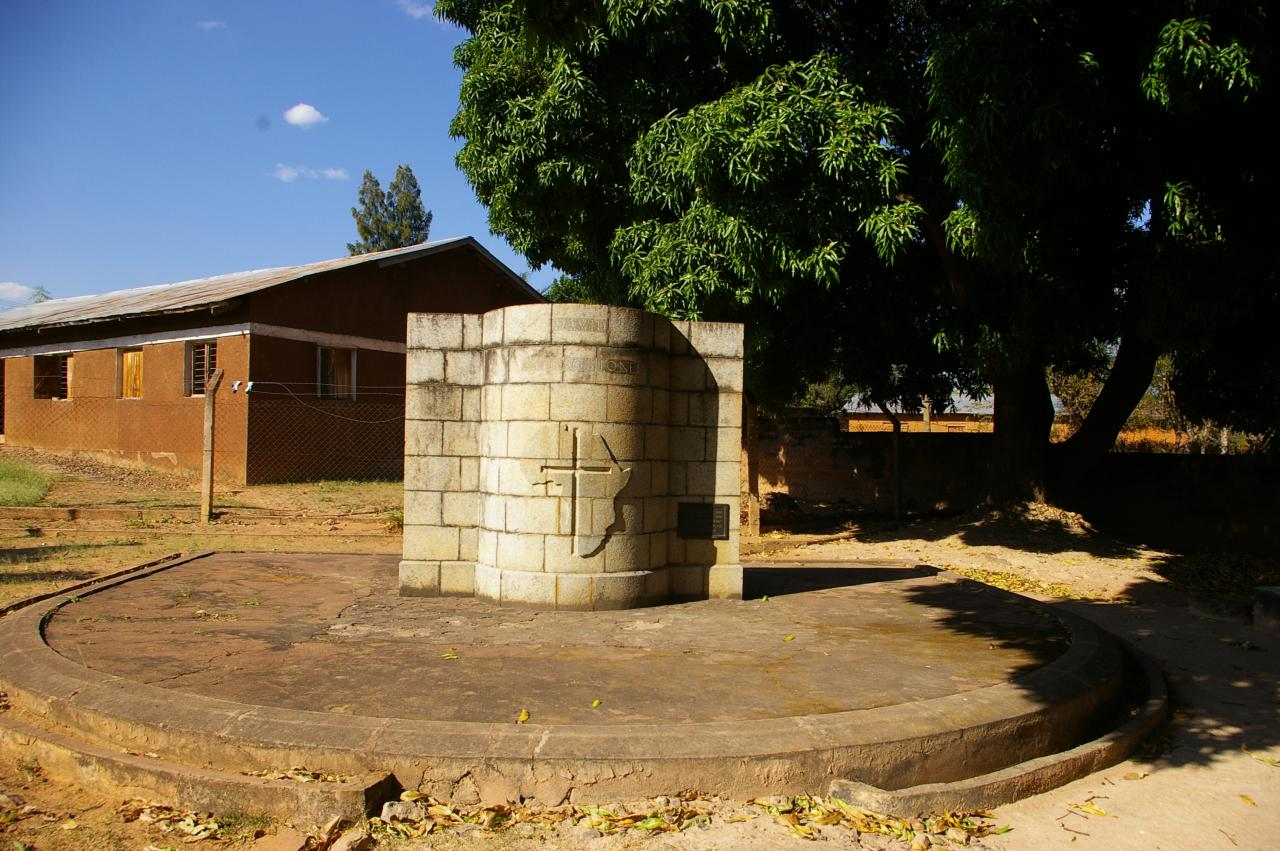
Livingstone Memorial
