= Jiji people =

Ethnic group from Kigoma Region of Tanzania

Jiji
Regions with significant populations

Languages
- Ha language

Religion
- Majority Islam, minority Christianity

Related ethnic groups
- Ha people & other Bantu peoples

Jiji people also known as Bajiji (Wajiji in Swahili) are a Bantu ethnic and linguistic group based in Kigoma Region, Tanzania. If tribes are classified by language and not by race, Bajiji (Jiji people) are part of Baha (Ha people) since their language is the same. Traditionally they were organized into a separate kingdom, Bujiji (Swahili Ujiji, same as the Swahili town of Ujiji near Kigoma), and formed part of Buha (Uha, Ha territory) with other kingdoms: Heru, Bushingo (Ushingo), Ruguru (Luguru), Muhambwe and Buyungu, all of them in Kigoma Region, Tanzania.

Most of the Jiji people are Muslim while a minority are Christian.
