= Hangaza language =

Bantu language of Tanzania

Hangaza
- Kihangaza
- Native to: Tanzania
- Ethnicity: Hangaza
- Native speakers: 155,000 (2009)
- Language family: Niger–Congo?: Atlantic–Congo; Volta-Congo; Benue–Congo; Bantoid; Southern Bantoid; Bantu; Northeast Bantu; Great Lakes Bantu; Rwanda-Rundi; Hangaza-Shubi; Hangaza

Language codes
- ISO 639-3: han
- Glottolog: hang1260
- Guthrie code: JD.65

Hangaza is a Bantu language spoken by the Hangaza people of Tanzania. It is closely related to and partially intelligible with the languages of Rwanda and Burundi.
