= Hutu =

Ethnic group of the African Great Lakes region

Hutu Abahutu
Regions with significant populations
- Rwanda: 11.1–12 million (84%–90% of the total population)
- Burundi: 10.4 million (85% of the total population)

Languages
- Kinyarwanda, Kirundi

Related ethnic groups
- Other Rwanda-Rundi peoples

The Hutu (/ˈhuːtuː/), also known as the Abahutu, are a Bantu ethnic group native to the African Great Lakes region. They primarily live in Rwanda, Burundi, Uganda, and the eastern parts of the Democratic Republic of the Congo, where they form one of the principal ethnic groups alongside the Tutsi and the Great Lakes Twa.

== Demographics ==
The Hutu is the largest of the three main population divisions in Burundi and Rwanda. Prior to 2017, the CIA World Factbook stated that 84% of Rwandans and 85% of Burundians are Hutu, with Tutsis being the second largest ethnic group at 15% and 14% of residents of Rwanda and Burundi, respectively. However, these figures were omitted in 2017 and no new figures have been published since then.

== Etymology ==
The idea that Hutu is etymologically derived from a word that signifies slave was advanced by Ernest Viaene (1910, p. 1047) and contradicted by René Bourgeois, who suggested that it originally meant "lords" in relation to the subordinate Twa pygmies. René Bourgeois reported that among the Mongo people of the DRC, Bantu people who ruled the local Twa were called "Bahoto" or "Bawoto", terms cognate to the “Bahutu” of Rwanda and Burundi, and which meant “lords” in the local language (not serfs) because they governed over the Pygmies.

== Origins ==
The Hutu are believed to have first emigrated to the Great Lake region from Central Africa in the great Bantu expansion. Various theories have emerged to explain the purported physical differences between them and their fellow Bantu-speaking neighbors, the Tutsi. The Tutsi were pastoralists and are believed to have established aristocratic control over the sedentary Hutu and Twa. Through intermarriage with the Hutu, the Tutsi were gradually assimilated, culturally, linguistically, and racially.

Others suggest that the two groups are related but not identical, and they also suggest that the differences between them were exacerbated by Europeans, or they were exacerbated by a gradual, natural split, as those who owned cattle became known as the Tutsi and those who did not own cattle became known as the Hutu. Mahmood Mamdani states that the Belgian colonial power designated people as Tutsi or Hutu on the basis of cattle ownership, physical measurements and church records.

The debate over the ethnic origins of the Hutu and Tutsi within Rwandan politics predates the Rwandan genocide, and it continues to the present day, with the government of Rwanda no longer using the distinction.

== Genetics ==
=== Y-DNA (paternal lineages) ===
Modern-day genetic studies of the Y-chromosome suggest that the Hutu, like the Tutsi, are largely of Bantu extraction (83% E1b1a, 8% E2). Paternal genetic influences associated with the Horn of Africa and North Africa are few (3% E1b1b and 1% R1b), and are ascribed to much earlier inhabitants who were assimilated. However, the Hutu have considerably fewer Nilo-Saharan paternal lineages (4.3% B) than the Tutsi (14.9% B).

=== Autosomal DNA (overall ancestry) ===
In general, the Hutu appear to share a close genetic kinship with neighboring Bantu populations, particularly the Tutsi. However, it is unclear whether this similarity is primarily due to extensive genetic exchanges between these communities through intermarriage or whether it ultimately stems from common origins:

[...] generations of gene flow obliterated whatever clear-cut physical distinctions may have once existed between these two Bantu peoples – renowned to be height, body build, and facial features. With a spectrum of physical variation in the peoples, Belgian authorities legally mandated ethnic affiliation in the 1920s, based on economic criteria. Formal and discrete social divisions were consequently imposed upon ambiguous biological distinctions. To some extent, the permeability of these categories in the intervening decades helped to reify the biological distinctions, generating a taller elite and a shorter underclass, but with little relation to the gene pools that had existed a few centuries ago. The social categories are thus real, but there is little if any detectable genetic differentiation between Hutu and Tutsi.

Tishkoff et al. (2009) found their mixed Hutu and Tutsi samples from Rwanda to be predominately of Bantu origin, with minor gene flow from Afro-Asiatic communities (17.7% Afro-Asiatic genes found in the mixed Hutu–Tutsi population).

== Language ==
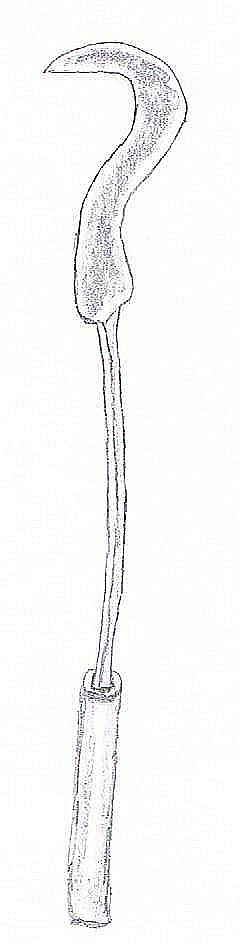
A traditional Hutu sickle.

Hutus speak Rwanda-Rundi as their native tongue, which is a member of the Bantu subgroup of the Niger–Congo language family. Rwanda-Rundi is subdivided into the Kinyarwanda and Kirundi dialects, which have been standardized as official languages of Rwanda and Burundi, respectively. It is also spoken as a mother tongue by the Tutsi and Twa.

Additionally, a small portion of Hutu speak French, the other official language of Rwanda and Burundi, as a lingua franca, although the population is dwindling given the poor relations between Rwanda and France.

== Post-colonial history ==
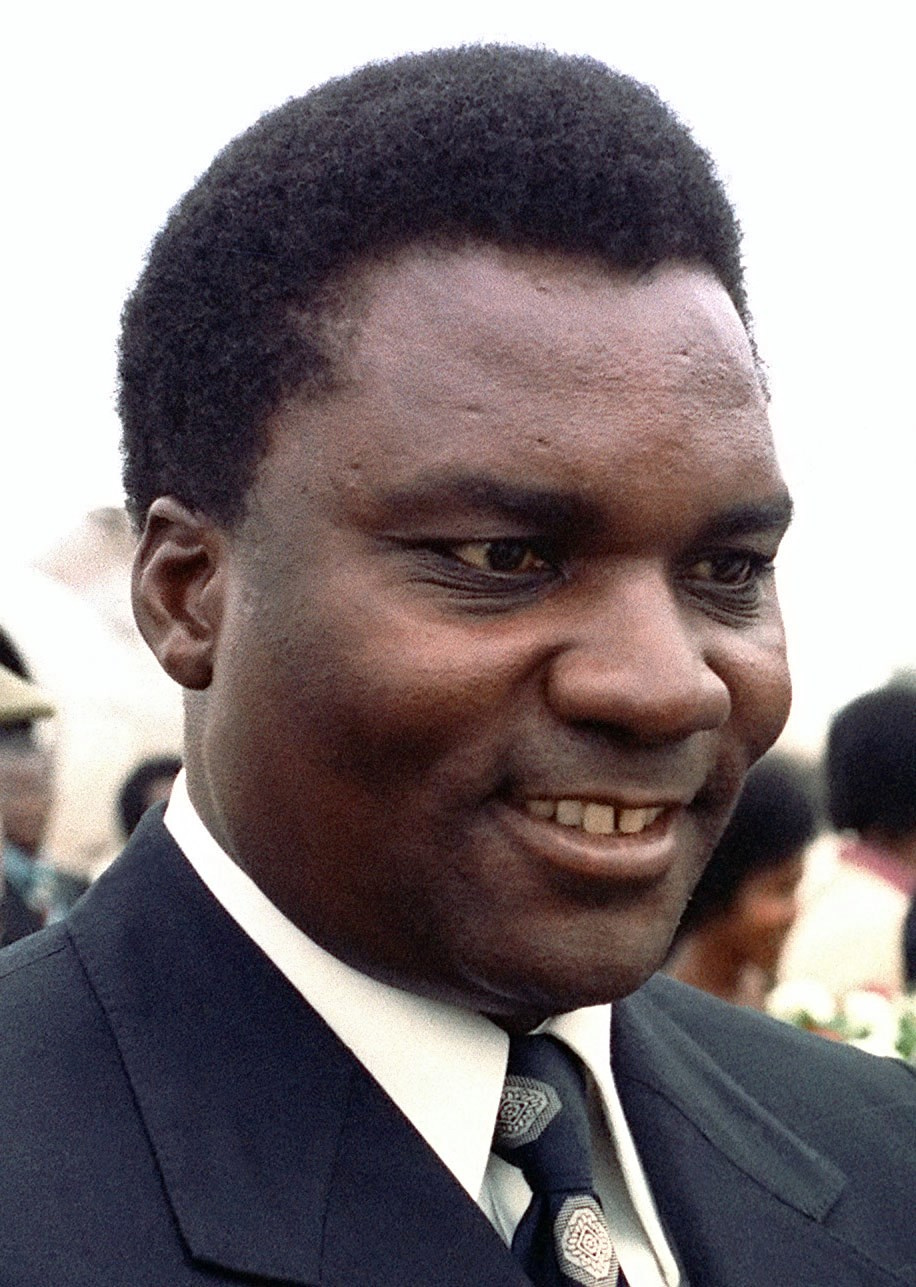
Juvénal Habyarimana, Hutu president of Rwanda from 1973 to 1994

The Belgian-sponsored Tutsi monarchy survived until 1959 when Kigeli V was exiled from the colony (then called Ruanda-Urundi). In Burundi, Tutsis, who are the minority, maintained control of the government and military. In Rwanda, the political power was transferred from the minority Tutsi to the majority Hutu.

In Rwanda, this led to the "Social revolution" and Hutu and Tutsis conflicts. Tens of thousands of Tutsis were killed, and many others fled to neighboring countries, such as Burundi, Uganda, and forming the Banyamulenge Tutsi ethnic group in the South Kivu region of the Belgian Congo. Later, exiled Tutsis from Burundi invaded Rwanda, prompting Rwanda to close its border to Burundi.

In Burundi, a campaign of genocide was conducted against the Hutu population in 1972, and an estimated 100,000 Hutus died. In 1993, Burundi's first democratically elected president, Melchior Ndadaye, who was Hutu, was believed to be assassinated by Tutsi officers, as was the person constitutionally entitled to succeed him. This sparked a counter-genocide in Burundi between Hutu political structures and the Tutsi military, in which an estimated 500,000 Burundians died. There were many mass killings of Tutsis and moderate Hutus; these events were deemed to be a genocide by the United Nations International Commission of Inquiry for Burundi.

A group of exiled Rwandan Tutsi rebels, the Rwandan Patriotic Front, invaded Rwanda from Uganda in 1990, which ignited hatred against the Tutsi people. A peace agreement was signed, but violence erupted again, culminating in the Rwandan genocide of 1994, when Hutu extremists killed an estimated 1,000,000 Rwandan Tutsis.

About 30% of the Twa pygmy population of Rwanda were also killed by the Hutu extremists. At the same time, the Rwandan Patriotic Front took control of the country and is still the ruling party as of 2020. Burundi is also currently governed by a former rebel group, the Hutu CNDD–FDD.

As of 2006, violence between the Hutu and Tutsi had subsided. However, the situation in both Rwanda and Burundi was still tense, with tens of thousands of Rwandans still living outside the country (see Great Lakes refugee crisis).

== See also ==
- Burundian Civil War
- History of Burundi
- History of Rwanda
- Rwandan Civil War
