= Tutsi =

Ethnic group of the African Great Lakes region

Tutsi Abatutsi
Regions with significant populations
- Burundi: 1.7 million (14% of the total population)
- Rwanda: 1–2 million (9%–15% of the total population)

Languages
- Kinyarwanda, Kirundi

Religion
- Christianity (80%), Islam (5%)

Related ethnic groups
- Other Rwanda-Rundi peoples and Hima people

The Tutsi (/ˈtʊtsi/ TUUT-see), also called Watusi, Watutsi or Abatutsi (Kinyarwanda pronunciation: [ɑ.βɑ.tuː.t͡si]), are an ethnic group established primarily in Rwanda and Burundi. They are a Bantu-speaking people and the second-largest of three main ethnic groups in Rwanda and Burundi, the other two being the Hutu and Twa.

Historically, the Tutsi were pastoralists and filled the ranks of the warrior caste. Before 1962, they controlled Rwandan society, which consisted of Tutsi aristocrats and Hutu commoners under a clientship structure, with Tutsi occupying dominant positions in the sharply stratified society, constituting the ruling class.

== Origins and classification ==
American historian Christopher Ehret believes that the Tutsi mainly descend from speakers of an extinct branch of South Cushitic he calls "Tale South Cushitic". The Tale Southern Cushites entered the African Great Lakes region sometime before 800 BC and were pastoralists who relied on their livestock and conceivably grew no grains themselves. They did not practice the hunting of wild animals and the consumption of fish was taboo and heavily avoided. The Tale Southern Cushitic way of life shows striking similarities to that of the Tutsi, who rely heavily on the milk, blood, and meat of their cattle and traditionally shun the cultivation and consumption of grains, look down on pottery and hunting, and avoid eating fish. A number of words related to pastoralism in the Rwanda-Rundi languages are Tale Southern Cushitic loanwords, such as "bull", "cow dung", and "lion". Some oral traditions and speculative narratives have occasionally attempted to link the origins of the Tutsi to groups from the Horn of Africa, such as Somali clans like the Gadabuursi. However, there is no widely accepted historical or academic evidence supporting these claims. Mainstream scholarship generally identifies the Tutsi as part of the populations of the African Great Lakes region, with a complex history shaped by long-term local and regional interactions.

This late continuation of Southern Cushites as important pastoralists in the southern half of the lacustrine region raises the intriguing possibility that the latter-day Tutsi and Hima pastoralism, most significant in the southern half of the region, is rooted in the Southern Cushitic culture and so derived from the east rather than the north.

— Christopher Ehret, UNESCO General History of Africa: Africa from the Twelfth to the Sixteenth Century,

The Tutsi also derive a significant amount of their ancestry from the Sog Eastern Sahelians, a long-extinct Nilo-Saharan group. The Sog were agro-pastoralists who entered Rwanda and Burundi around 2,000 BC, mostly settling in southern Rwanda and to the east and west of the Ruzizi River. According to Ehret, they spoke a Kir-Abbaian language that was related to, but distinct from, Nilotic and Surmic languages. The Western Lakes Bantu languages spoken by the Tutsi have many Sog Eastern Sahelian loanwords, such as the word for cow (inka), which originally meant "cattle camp" in the Sog language, demonstrating their contribution to Tutsi pastoralism.

Central Sudanic peoples likely form another part of the ancestry of the Tutsi. Central Sudanic farmers and herders entered Rwanda and Burundi around 3000 BC, and some of their cultural practices have remained following their assimilation by the Bantu. For example, in Central Sudanic–speaking societies, women are kept away from cattle. Among the Tutsi, and the neighbouring Hima to the north, women, especially if menstruating, are strictly forbidden to milk cows.

The definition of "Tutsi" has changed through time and location. Social structures were unstable throughout Rwanda, even during colonial times under Belgian rule. Generally, the Tutsi elite or aristocracy was distinguished from Tutsi commoners.

When the Belgian colonial administration conducted censuses, it identified the people throughout Rwanda-Burundi according to a simple classification scheme. "Tutsi" were defined as anyone owning more than ten cows or with physical features such as a longer, thin nose, high cheekbones, or being over six feet tall, all of which are common descriptions associated with the Tutsi.

In the colonial era, the Tutsi were hypothesized to have arrived in the Great Lakes region from the Horn of Africa, in accordance with the Hamitic hypothesis.

Tutsi are considered by some to be of Cushitic origin, although they do not speak a Cushitic language, and have inhabited the same areas for 400 years, leading to considerable intermarriage with Hutu in the area. Due to the history of intermingling and intermarrying of Hutu and Tutsi, some ethnographers and historians believe that the Hutu and Tutsi cannot be called distinct ethnic groups.

== Genetics ==
=== Y-DNA ===
A 2004 study which included Y-chromosome frequencies for Rwandan males, indicated that the Tutsi, like the Hutu, are largely of Bantu extraction (60% E1b1a, 20% B, 4% E-P2(xE1b1a)). Paternal genetic influences associated with the Horn of Africa and North Africa were few (under 3% E1b1b-M35), and are ascribed to much earlier inhabitants who were assimilated. However, the Tutsi have considerably more haplogroup B Y-DNA paternal lineages (14.9% B) than the Hutu (4.3% B).

Beniamino Trombetta in 2015 found 22.2% of E1b1b-M293 in a small sample of Tutsis from Burundi, with no bearers of the haplogroup found amongst the Burundian Hutu and Twa populations.

=== Autosomal DNA ===
According to the New Encyclopedia of Africa in 2008, the Tutsi appear to share a close genetic kinship with neighbouring Bantu populations, particularly the Hutu. However, it is unclear whether this similarity is primarily due to extensive genetic exchanges between these communities through intermarriage or whether it ultimately stems from common origins:

Again, generations of gene flow obliterated whatever clear-cut physical distinctions may have once existed between these two Bantu peoples—renowned to be height, body build, and facial features. With a spectrum of physical variation in the peoples, Belgian authorities legally mandated ethnic affiliation in the 1920s, based on economic criteria. Formal and discrete social divisions were consequently imposed upon ambiguous biological distinctions. To some extent, the permeability of these categories in the intervening decades helped to reify the biological distinctions, generating a taller elite and a shorter underclass, but with little relation to the gene pools that had existed a few centuries ago. The social categories are thus real, but there is little if any detectable genetic differentiation between Hutu and Tutsi.

In 2009, Sarah Tishkoff found their mixed Hutu and Tutsi samples from Rwanda to be predominantly in the Niger-Kordofanian cluster (orange), but with evidence of gene flow from Nilo-Saharan and Cushitic speaking clusters (purple).

=== Height ===
Their average height is 5 feet 9 inches (175 cm), although individuals have been recorded as being taller than 7 feet (210 cm).

== History ==
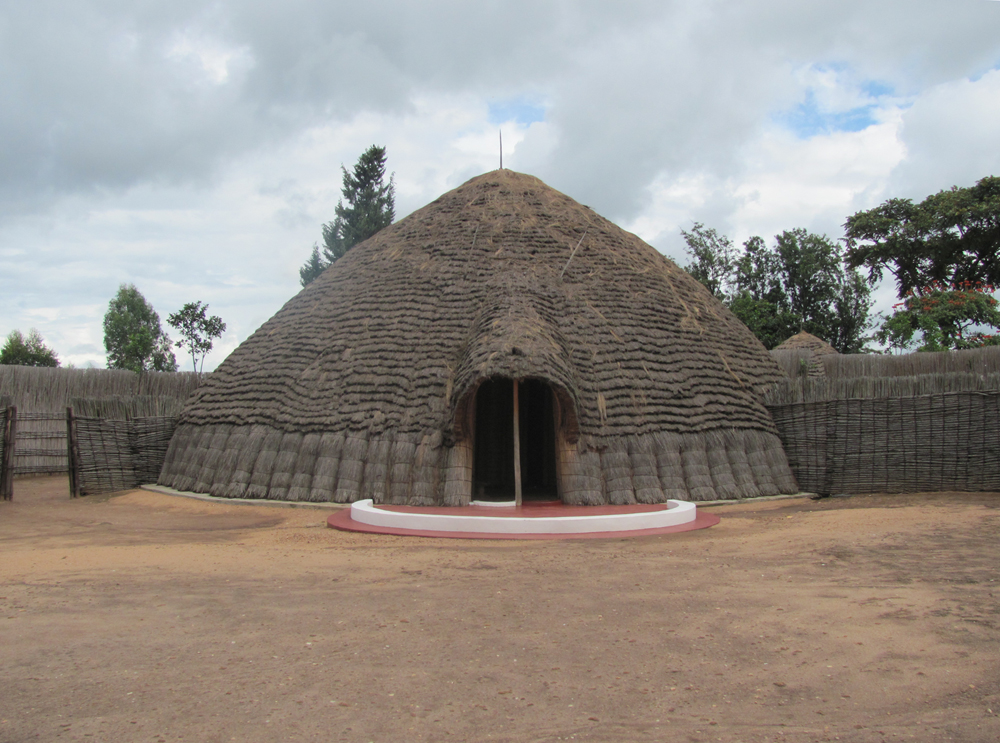

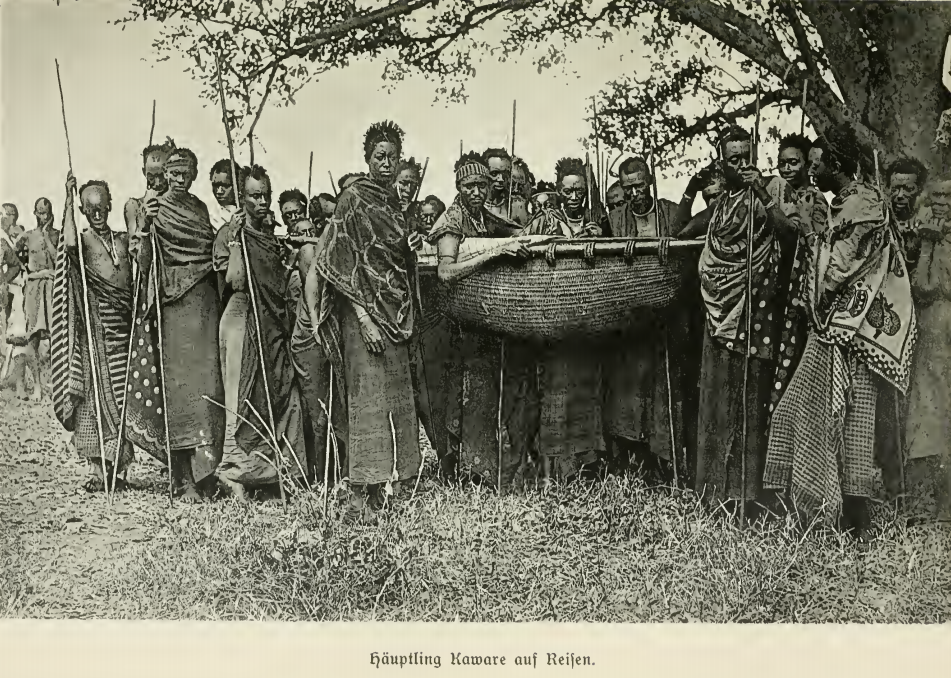
The traditional Tutsi king's palace in Nyanza (top) and Rwanda c. 1900, Tutsi Chief Kaware travelling (bottom)

Prior to the arrival of colonists, Rwanda had been ruled by a Tutsi-dominated monarchy since the 15th century. In 1897, Germany established a presence in Rwanda with the formation of an alliance with the king, beginning the colonial era. Later, Belgium took control in 1916 during World War I. Both European nations ruled through the Rwandan king and perpetuated a pro-Tutsi policy.

In Burundi, meanwhile, a ruling faction known as the ganwa emerged and quickly assumed effective control of the country's administration. The ganwa, who relied on support from both Hutu and Tutsi populations to rule, were perceived within Burundi as neither Hutu nor Tutsi.

Rwanda was ruled as a colony by Germany from 1897 to 1916, and by Belgium from 1922 to 1961. Both the Tutsi and Hutu had been the traditional governing elite, but both colonial powers allowed only the Tutsi to be educated and to participate in the colonial government. Such discriminatory policies engendered resentment.

When the Belgians took over, they believed the areas could be better governed if they continued to identify the different populations as they had been previously identified. In the 1920s, the Belgian authorities required the population to identify with a particular ethnic group and the authorities classified them accordingly in censuses.

In 1959, Belgium reversed its stance and allowed the majority Hutu to assume control of the government through universal elections after independence. This partly reflected internal Belgian domestic politics, in which the discrimination against the Hutu majority came to be regarded as similar to oppression within Belgium stemming from the Flemish-Walloon conflict, and the democratisation and empowerment of the Hutu was seen as a just response to Tutsi domination. Belgian policies wavered considerably during the period leading up to the independence of Rwanda and Burundi.

=== Independence of Rwanda and Burundi (1962) ===
The Hutu majority in Rwanda revolted against the Tutsi and was able to take power. Many Tutsi fled and created exile communities outside Rwanda, in Uganda and Tanzania.

Overt discrimination from the colonial period was continued by different Rwandan and Burundian governments, including identity cards that distinguished between Tutsi and Hutu.

=== Ethnic violence in Burundi (1993) ===
In 1993, Burundi's first democratically elected president, Melchior Ndadaye, a Hutu, was assassinated by Tutsi officers, as was the president of the National Assembly Pontien Karibwami, entitled to succeed him under the constitution, and several other key members of the government. This sparked ethnic violence in Burundi, in which "possibly as many as 25,000 Tutsi" – including military, civil servants, and civilians – were murdered by Hutu and "at least as many" Hutu were killed by Tutsi. Since the 2000 Arusha Accords, Burundi's Tutsi minority shares power in a more or less equitable manner with the Hutu majority. Traditionally, the Tutsi held more economic power and controlled the military.

=== 1994 genocide against the Tutsi in Rwanda ===
Flag of the Tutsi-led Rwandan Patriotic Front

A similar pattern of events took place in Rwanda, where the Hutu came to power in 1962. They in turn often oppressed the Tutsi, who fled the country. After the anti-Tutsi violence of the Rwandan Revolution (1959–1961), Tutsi fled in large numbers.

These Tutsi communities in exile gave rise to Tutsi rebel movements. The Rwandan Patriotic Front (RPF), mostly made up of exiled Tutsi living in Uganda, attacked Rwanda in 1990 with the intention of taking back power for the Tutsi. The RPF had experience in organised irregular warfare from the Ugandan Bush War and received support from the Ugandan government. The initial RPF advance was halted by a lift of French arms to the Rwandan government. Attempts at peace culminated in the 1993 Arusha Accords.

The agreement broke down after the assassination of the Rwandan and Burundian presidents, triggering a resumption of hostilities and the start of the Rwandan Genocide of 1994, in which the Hutu killed an estimated 500,000–600,000 people, mostly Tutsi. Victorious in the aftermath of the genocide, the Tutsi-led RPF came to power in July 1994.

== Culture ==
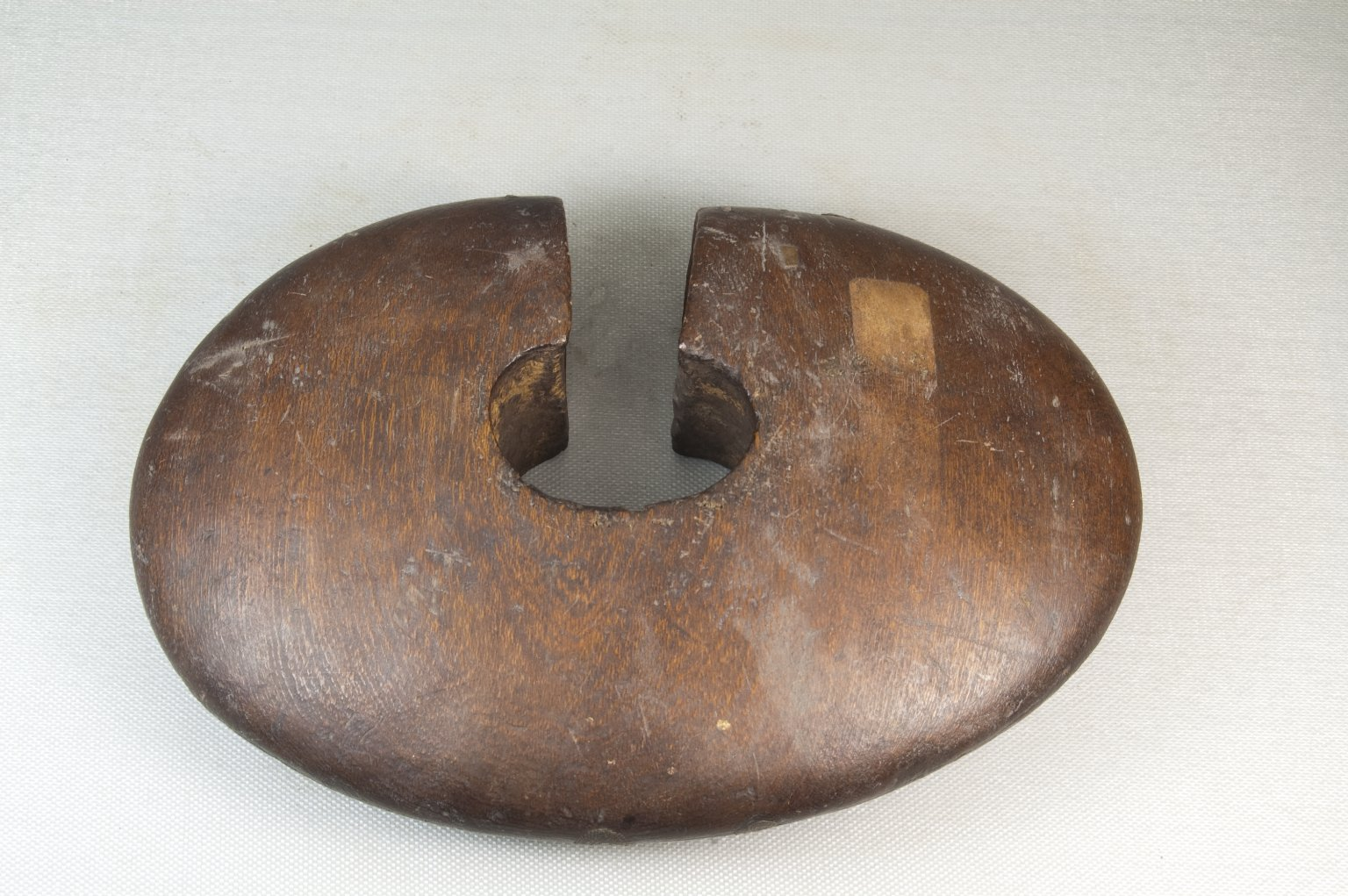
A traditional Tutsi wrist guard (igitembe)

In Rwanda, from the 15th century until 1961, the Tutsi were ruled by a king (the mwami). Belgium abolished the monarchy, following the national referendum that led to independence. By contrast, in the northwestern part of the country, which is predominantly Hutu, large landholders shared power, similar to the society of Buganda in present-day Uganda.

Under their king, Tutsi culture traditionally revolved around administering justice and government. They were the only proprietors of cattle, and sustained themselves on their own products. Additionally, their lifestyle afforded them plenty of leisure, which they spent cultivating poetry, weaving, and music. Due to the Tutsi's status as a dominant minority vis-a-vis the Hutu farmers and the other local inhabitants, this relationship has been likened to that between lords and serfs in feudal Europe.

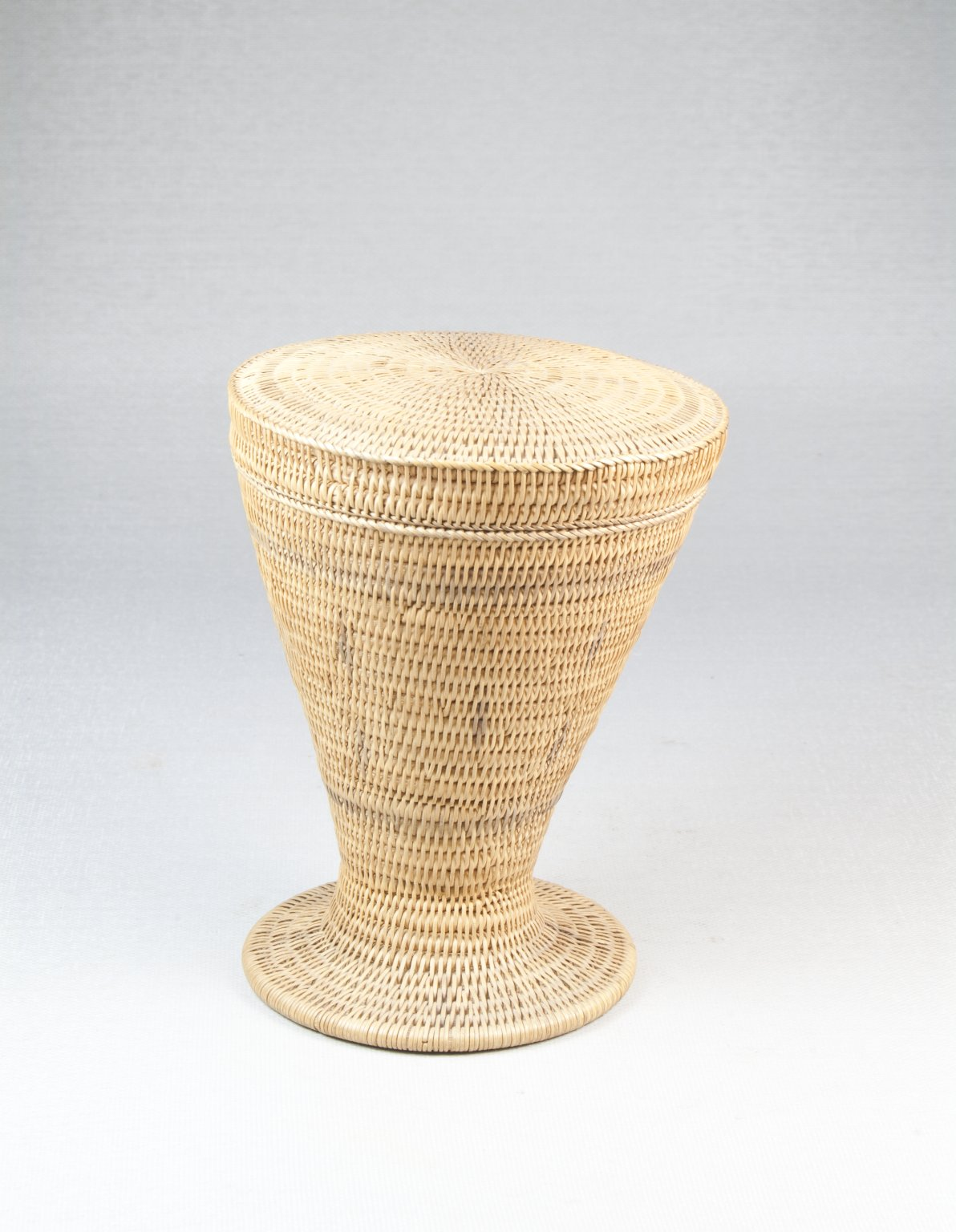
A traditional Tutsi basket

According to British historian John Fage, the Tutsi are serologically related to Bantu and Nilotic populations. This in turn rules out a possible Cushitic origin for the founding Tutsi-Hima ruling class in the lacustrine kingdoms. However, the royal burial customs of the latter kingdoms are quite similar to those practised by the former Cushitic Sidama states in the southern Gibe region of Ethiopia.

By contrast, Bantu populations to the north of the Tutsi-Hima in the Mount Kenya area, such as the Agikuyu, were until modern times essentially without a king, instead having a stateless age set system which they adopted from Cushitic peoples, while there were a number of Bantu kingdoms to the south of the Tutsi-Hima in Tanzania, all of which shared the Tutsi-Hima's chieftaincy pattern. Since the Cushitic Sidama kingdoms interacted with Nilotic groups, Fage proposes that the Tutsi may have descended from one such migrating Nilotic population. The Nilotic ancestors of the Tutsi would in earlier times have served as cultural intermediaries, adopting some monarchical traditions from adjacent Cushitic kingdoms and subsequently taking those borrowed customs south with them when they first settled amongst Bantu autochthones in the Great Lakes area.

However, little difference can be ascertained between the cultures today of the Tutsi and Hutu; both groups speak the same Bantu language. The rate of intermarriage between the two groups was traditionally very high, and relations were amicable until the 20th century. Many scholars have concluded that the determination of Tutsi was and is mainly an expression of class or caste, rather than ethnicity. Burundians and Rwandans have similar languages, Kirundi and Kinyarwanda. English, French and Swahili serve as additional official languages for different historic reasons, and are widely spoken by both Burundians and Rwandans as a second language.

== Tutsi in the Congo ==
Scholars have long recognised that the Tutsi presence in the modern Democratic Republic of the Congo (DRC) is best understood by distinguishing between two principal groups, whose histories have been significantly shaped—and often distorted—by colonial policies and later political struggles.

=== Banyarwanda in North and South Kivu ===
A second Tutsi presence is found among the broader Banyarwanda community in parts of North Kivu. This community, which includes both Tutsi and Hutu, is largely the result of multiple migratory waves from neighbouring Rwanda, occurring over the pre-colonial, colonial, and post-genocide periods. In particular, the mass exodus during and after the Rwandan Genocide of 1994 is well documented and has significantly reshaped the ethnic landscape in eastern Congo. The academic consensus holds that these migratory processes, far from being a single exogenous event, have complex historical antecedents that continue to influence regional politics.

=== Conflict and Contemporary Issues ===
The eastern DRC has been a hotspot of conflict for decades, involving numerous armed groups. Some of these, notably those evolving from the National Congress for the Defence of the People (CNDP) into what became known as the M23, have been led by individuals of Tutsi background. However, the portrayal of these groups solely through an ethnic lens oversimplifies the situation. Academic studies agree that the roots of the conflict lie in a mixture of colonial legacies, competition over valuable resources such as cobalt, and deep-seated political and social grievances. Reports from international organisations have documented serious human rights abuses—including the recruitment of child soldiers and illegal exploitation of mineral wealth—but these are best understood within the broader framework of state fragility and international economic pressures rather than as a straightforward ethnic conflict.

== Notable people ==
- Arielle Kayabaga
- Benjamin Sehene
- Cécile Kayirebwa
- Gaël Bigirimana
- Gaël Faye
- Jean Baptiste Bagaza
- Louise Mushikiwabo
- Michel Micombero
- Ncuti Gatwa
- Paul Kagame
- Pierre Buyoya
- Saido Berahino
- Stromae
