= Meeussen's rule =

Sound law

Meeussen's rule is a special case of tone reduction. It was first described in Bantu languages, but occurs in analyses of other languages as well, such as Papuan languages. The tonal alternation that it describes is the lowering, in some contexts, of the last tone of a pattern of two adjacent high tones (HH), resulting in the pattern HL. The phenomenon is named after its first observer, the Belgian Bantu specialist A. E. Meeussen (1912–1978). In phonological terms, the phenomenon can be seen as a special case of the obligatory contour principle.

The term "Meeussen's Rule" (the spelling with a capital R is more common) first appeared in a paper by John Goldsmith in 1981. It is based on an observation made by Meeussen in his 1963 article on the Tonga verb stating that "in a sequence of determinants, only the first is treated as a determinant". John Goldsmith reformulated that as the rule HH > HL (or, as he expressed it, H → L / H ), which later became well known as Meeussen's rule.

Meeussen's rule is one of a number of processes in Bantu languages by which a series of consecutive high tones is avoided. The processes result in a less tonal, more accentual character in Bantu tone systems and causes a situation in which there tends to be only one tone per word or morpheme.

== Examples ==
Here are some illustrations of the phenomenon in Kirundi, a Bantu language of Burundi (examples adapted from Philippson 1998).

=== In verb forms ===
- na-rá-zi-báriira (I-PAST-them.CL10-to sew) 'I was sewing them' (them refers to a class 10 plural)
- na-rá-bariira (I-PAST-to sew) 'I was sewing'

In the first sentence, both the tense marker rá and the verb form báriira (to sew) carry a high tone, signified by the acute accent. They are separated by the pronominal marker zi. In the second sentence, the pronominal marker zi is left out, resulting in two adjacent high tones. The phenomenon described by Meeussen's rule causes the second high tone to change into a low tone.

=== In noun forms ===
- bukéeye > umuɲábukéeye
- mwáaro > umuɲámwaaro

The examples show a way of deriving from place names nouns with the meaning 'a person originating from'. In the first example, the place name bukéeye has a high tone on the second syllable. The junction with umuɲá ('person from') has no influence on this tone. In the second example, a place name with a High tone on the first syllable is used. Like above, the second high tone of the resulting pattern of two adjacent high tones is changed into a low tone because of the phenomenon described by Meeussen's rule.

=== HHH > HLL ===
Just as HH (high tone + high tone) can become HL (high tone + low tone) by Meeussen's rule, HHH also often becomes HLL, and HHHH becomes HLLL. Thus in Luganda, a Bantu language of Uganda, the word *bá-lí-lába 'they will see', which theoretically has three High tones, is actually pronounced bálilabá with only one. (The tone on the last syllable is an automatically generated phrasal tone; see Luganda tones.)

This process does not operate in the same way in every language, however. For example, in Shona, a Bantu language of Zimbabwe, the similar verb *á-chá-téngá 'he will buy' transforms to á-cha-téngá, where only one syllable is lowered by Meeussen's rule.

== Exceptions ==
Spreading of a tone across two or more syllables is quite common in Bantu languages. Tones that derive from spreading (or from plateauing, the spreading of high pitch from one high tone to another) are not affected by Meeussen's rule. Thus, in the Chewa language of Malawi, for example, when the word kuphíka 'to cook' is followed by a direct object such as nyama 'meat', the tone on the penultimate syllable will spread: kuphíká nyama 'to cook meat'.

There are many other exceptions to Meeussen's rule. For example, Shona verbs, in certain circumstances, may have two high tones in adjacent syllables. In the subjunctive tí-téngésé 'we should sell', both tí and té- have underlying high tones (the high tones of -ngésé arise from tone spreading), yet the tone of té- is not deleted. Likewise, in the Chewa verb a-ná-ká-fótokoza 'he went and explained', the tone of ká 'go and' does not get lowered although it follows the high-toned tense-marker ná.

== Sources ==
- Goldsmith, John (1981). "Towards an Autosegmental Theory of Accent: The Case of Tonga", Indiana University Linguistics Club.
- Goldsmith, John (1984a) "Meeussen's Rule" in Aronoff, M. & Oehrle, R (eds.), Language Sound Structure, Cambridge, Mass., MIT.
- Goldsmith, John (1984b), "Tone and accent in Tonga", in Clements, G.N. & Goldsmith, J. (1984) Autosegmental Studies in Bantu Tone. Dordrecht.
- Hyman, Larry M. & Francis X. Katamba (1993). "A new approach to tone in Luganda", in Language. 69. 1, pp. 33–67.
- Kanerva, Jonni M. (1990). Focus and Phrasing in Chichewa Phonology. New York, Garland.
- Meeussen, A.E. (1963) "Morphotonology of the Tonga verb". Journal of African Languages, 2.72–92.
- Myers, Scott (1997) "OCP Effects in Optimality Theory", Natural Language & Linguistic Theory, Vol. 15, No. 4.
- Sharman, J.C. & A.E. Meeussen (1955) 'The representation of structural tones, with special reference to the tonal behaviour of the verb, in Bemba, Northern Rhodesia'. Africa, 25, 393-404.
- Philippson, Gérard (1998) Tone reduction vs. metrical attraction in the evolution of Eastern Bantu tone systems. Paris: INALCO. (online version)
