= Ha language =

Language spoken in Tanzania

Ha
- Igiha
- Native to: Tanzania
- Ethnicity: Abaha
- Native speakers: (990,000 cited 2001)
- Language family: Niger–Congo?: Atlantic–Congo; Volta-Congo; Benue–Congo; Bantoid; Southern Bantoid; Bantu; Northeast Bantu; Great Lakes Bantu; Rwanda-Rundi; Ha
- Writing system: Latin (proposed)

Language codes
- ISO 639-3: haq
- Glottolog: haaa1252
- Guthrie code: JD.66

- People: Abaha
- Language: Igiha
- Country: Buha

Ha, also known with the Bantu language prefix as Giha, Igiha, or Kiha, is a Bantu language spoken by the Ha people of the Kigoma Region of Tanzania, spoken on the eastern side of Lake Tanganyika up to the headwaters of the Mikonga. It is closely related to the languages of Rwanda and Burundi; neighboring dialects are reported to be mutually intelligible with Kirundi.

== Phonology ==
=== Consonants ===
		Bilabial	Labio- dental	Alveolar	Palatal	Velar	Glottal
Nasal		m		n	ɲ		
Plosive	voiceless	p		t		k	
Plosive	voiced	b		d	ɟ	ɡ	
Affricate			p͡f	t͡s	t͡ʃ		
Fricative	voiceless		f	s	ʃ		h
Fricative	voiced	(β)	v	z			
Tap				ɾ			
Approximant				(l)	j	w	

- /ɾ/ is heard as [l] among different dialects in free variation.
- /b/ can be heard as either [b] or [β] in complementary distribution.

=== Vowels ===
	Front	Central	Back
High	i iː		u uː
Mid	e eː		o oː
Low		a aː	
