= Shubi language =

Bantu language

Shubi
- Region: Kagera Region in Tanzania
- Ethnicity: Shubi people
- Native speakers: (153,000 cited 1987)
- Language family: Niger–Congo?: Atlantic–Congo; Volta-Congo; Benue–Congo; Bantoid; Bantu; Northeast Bantu; Great Lakes Bantu; Ruanda-Rundi; Hangaza-Shubi; Shubi

Language codes
- ISO 639-3: suj
- Glottolog: shub1238
- Guthrie code: JD.64

Shubi is a Bantu language spoken by the Shubi people in north-western Tanzania.

It may use labiodental plosives /p̪/, /b̪/ (sometimes written ȹ, ȸ) as phonemes, rather than as allophones of /p, b/. Peter Ladefoged wrote:

We have heard labiodental stops made by a Shubi speaker whose teeth were sufficiently close together to allow him to make an airtight labiodental closure. For this speaker this sound was clearly in contrast with a bilabial stop; but we suspect that the majority of Shubi speakers make the contrast one of bilabial stop versus labial-labiodental affricate (i.e. bilabial stop closure followed by a labiodental fricative), rather than bilabial versus labiodental stop.

== Vocabulary ==
Many Bantu languages have a large set of lexical items for expressing time-frames by days (similar to English's yesterday, today, tomorrow, day after tomorrow). However, Shubi has a small set compared to other Bantu languages:

Shubi time-frame words
Shubi	English gloss
nyenkilo	yesterday
mbwenu	today
nyencha	tomorrow
bukiile	the following day
kale	in the past
