= Hangaza people =

Ethnic group from Kagera Region of Tanzania

The Hangaza are a Bantu ethnolinguistic group based in Ngara District of Kagera Region in northwestern Tanzania. The Hangaza population is estimated to number 450,000.
