= Kirundi =

Bantu language of Burundi and adjacent states

Rundi
- Ikirundi
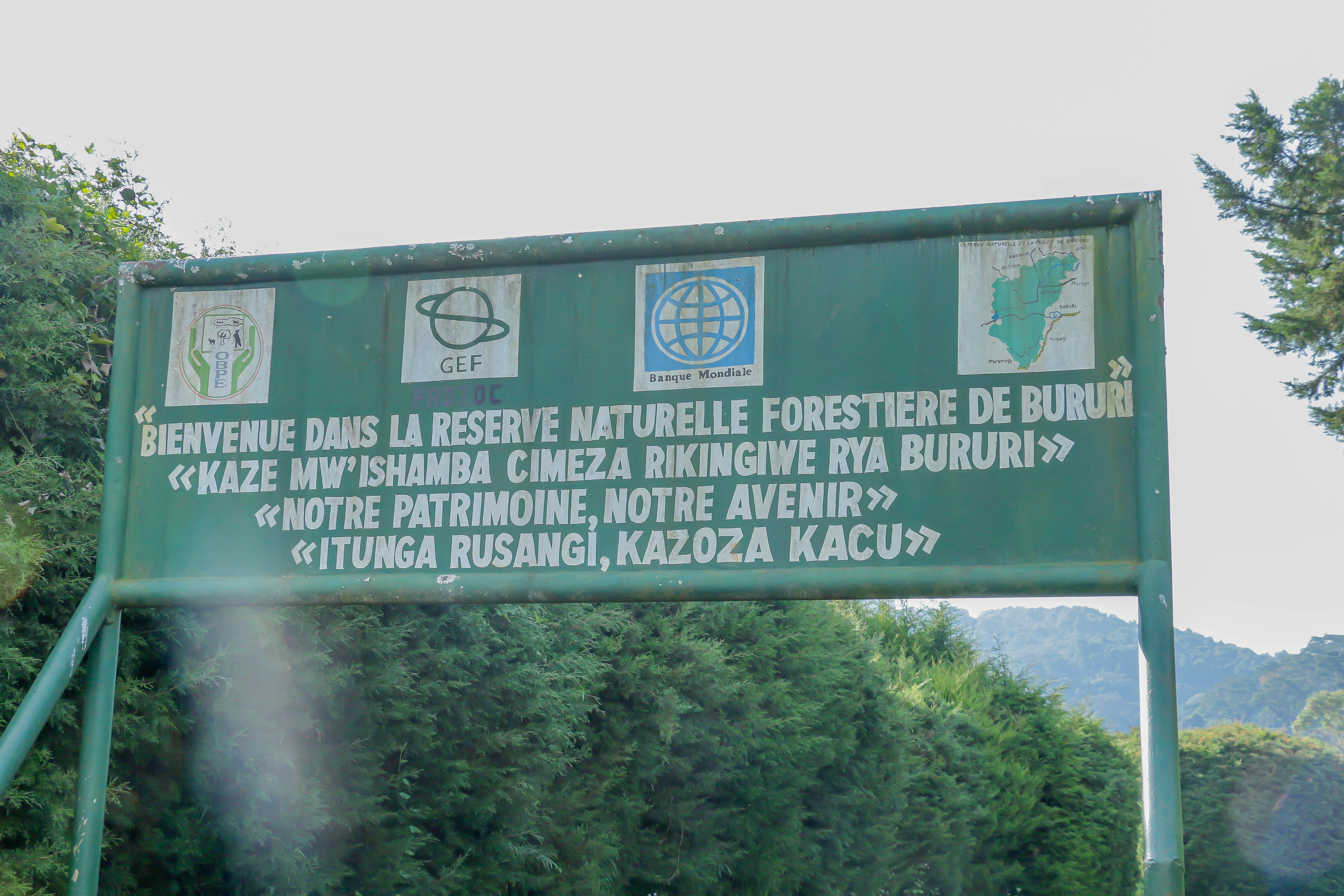
- The Kirundi text below welcomes visitors to the Bururi natural forrest reserve.
- Native to: Burundi
- Ethnicity: Hutu; Tutsi; Twa; Ganwa
- Native speakers: 13 million (2021)
- Language family: Niger–Congo?: Atlantic–Congo; Volta-Congo; Benue–Congo; Bantoid; Southern Bantoid; Bantu; Northeast Bantu; Great Lakes Bantu; Western Lakes Bantu; Rwanda-Rundi; Rundic; Rundi
- Dialects: Ikibo; Ikirundi; Ikiragane; Igisoni; Ikinyabweru; Ikiyogoma; Ikimoso
- Writing system: Latin

Official status
- Official language in: Burundi

Language codes
- ISO 639-1: rn Rundi
- ISO 639-2: run Rundi
- ISO 639-3: run Rundi
- Glottolog: rund1242 Rundi rund1241 Rundi-Kitwa
- Guthrie code: JD.62

- Person: Umurundi
- People: Abarundi
- Language: Ikirundi
- Country: u Burundi

Kirundi (/kɪˈrʊndi, -ˈrʌn-/), officially known as Ikirundi (also known as Rundi), is a Bantu language and the national language of Burundi. It is mutually intelligible with Kinyarwanda, the national language of Rwanda, and the two form parts of the Rwanda-Rundi dialect continuum spoken in Burundi, Rwanda, Tanzania, Democratic Republic of Congo, Uganda, and Kenya.

Kirundi is natively spoken by the Hutu (including the Bakiga), Tutsi, Twa, and the Hima people; other related ethnicities have also adopted Kirundi as their mother tongue. Neighbouring dialects of Kirundi are mutually intelligible with Ha, a language spoken in western Tanzania.

Kirundi is one of the languages where Meeussen's rule, a rule describing a certain pattern of tonal change in Bantu languages, is active.

In 2020, the Rundi Academy was established to help standardize and promote Kirundi.

== Phonology ==
=== Consonants ===
Although the literature on Rundi agrees on 5 vowels, the number of consonants can vary anywhere from 19 to 26 consonants. The table below is compiled from a survey of academic acceptance of Rundi consonants.

| | | Labial | Alveolar | Post- alveolar | Palatal | Velar | Glottal |
|---|---|---|---|---|---|---|---|
| Nasal | | m | n | | ɲ | ŋ | |
| Plosive | voiceless | p | t | | | k | |
| Plosive | voiced | b | d | | ɟ | ɡ | |
| Affricate | | p͡f | t͡s | t͡ʃ | | | |
| Fricative | voiceless | f | s | ʃ | | | h |
| Fricative | voiced | v | z | ʒ | | | |
| Approximant | | | | | j | w | |
| Flap | | | ɾ | | | | |
| Trill | | | r | | | | |

=== Vowels ===
The table below gives the vowel sounds of Rundi.

| | Front | Back |
|---|---|---|
| Close | i | u |
| Mid | e | o |
| Open | a | |

All five vowels occur in long and short forms. The distinction is phonemic.

=== Tone ===
Rundi is a tonal language. There are two essential tones in Rundi: high and low (or H and L). Since Rundi has phonemic distinction on vowel length, when a long vowel changes from a low tone to a high tone it is marked as a rising tone. When a long vowel changes from a high tone to a low tone, it is marked as a falling tone.

Rundi is often used in phonology to illustrate examples of Meeussen's rule In addition, it has been proposed that tones can shift by a metrical or rhythmic structure. Some authors have expanded these more complex features of the tonal system noting that such properties are highly unusual for a tone system.

=== Phonotactics ===
Syllable structure in Rundi is considered to be CV, that is having no clusters, no coda consonants, and no complex vowel nuclei. It has been proposed that sequences that are CVV in the surface realization are actually CV in the underlying deep structure, with the consonant coalescing with the first vowel.

=== Consonant harmony ===
Rundi has been shown to have properties of consonant harmony particularly when it comes to sibilants. Meeussen described this harmony in his essay and it is investigated further by others. One example of this harmony is triggered by /ʃ/ and /ʒ/ and targets the set of /s/ and /z/ in preceding adjacent stem syllables.

== Orthography ==
| Letter(s) | a | b | c | d | e | f | g | h | i | j | k | m | n | ny | o | p | pf | r | s | sh | t | ts | u | v | w | y | z | zh |
| IPA | a, aː | β, b | t͡ʃ | d | e, eː | f | ɡ, ɟ | h, ɦ | i, iː | ɟ | k, c | m | n, ŋ | ɲ | o, oː | p | p͡f | ɾ | s | ʃ | t | t͡s | u, uː | v | w | j | z | ʒ |

== Grammar ==
=== Nouns ===
Kirundi, similarly to Kinyarwanda, uses 16 of the Bantu noun classes. Sometimes these are grouped into 10 pairs so that most singular and plural forms of the same word are included in the same class. The table below shows the 16 noun classes and how they are paired in two commonly used systems.

| Prefix | Classification | | | Number | Typical words | Example |
| Prefix | Bantu | Cox | ??? | Number | Typical words | Example |
|---|---|---|---|---|---|---|
| umu- | 1 | 1 | | singular | humans | umuntu – person |
| aba- | 2 | 1 | | plural | humans | abantu – people |
| umu- | 3 | 2 | | singular | trees, shrubs and things that extend | umusozi – hill |
| imi- | 4 | 2 | | plural | trees, shrubs and things that extend | imisozi – hills |
| iri- | 5 | 5 | 3 | singular | things in quantities, liquids | iryinyo – tooth |
| ama- | 6 | 5/8/9 | 3/8/9 | plural (also substances) | things in quantities, liquids | amenyo – teeth |
| iki- | 7 | 4 | | singular | generic, large, or abnormal things | ikintu – thing |
| ibi- | 8 | 4 | | plural | generic, large, or abnormal things | ibintu – things |
| in- | 9 | 3 | 5 | singular | some plants, animals and household implements | inka – cow |
| in- | 10 | 3/6 | 5/6 | plural | some plants, animals and household implements | inka – cows |
| uru- | 11 | 6 | | singular | mixture, body parts | urugo – home |
| aka- | 12 | 7 | | singular | diminutive forms of other nouns | akantu – little thing |
| utu- | 13 | 7 | | plural | diminutive forms of other nouns | utuntu – little things |
| ubu- | 14 | 8 | | n/a | abstract nouns, qualities or states | ubuntu – generosity |
| uku- | 15 | 9 | | n/a | actions, verbal nouns and gerunds | ukuntu – means |
| aha- | 16 | 10 | | n/a | places, locations | ahantu – place |

== Official use ==
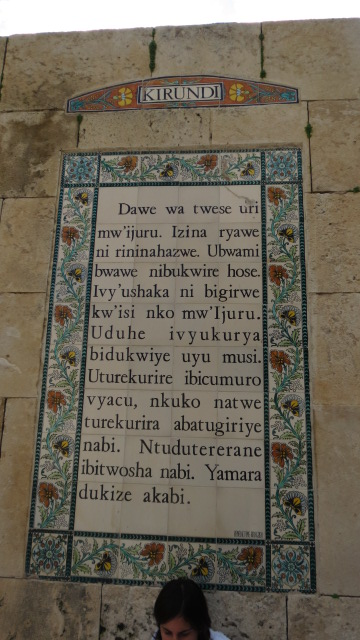
The Lord's Prayer in Kirundi (Church of the Pater Noster)

Kirundi was recognized an official language in Burundi by the 1962 Constitution of the Kingdom of Burundi. In accordance with the constitution, many Burundian government orders, especially those printed in the Bulletin Officiel du Burundi from 1962 to 1963, were written in both French and Kirundi. After the constitution was suspended in 1966, Kirundi remained a de facto official language in the country, though its use in government documents declined. In 1972, Kirundi was adopted as the official language of instruction in Burundian primary schools.
