= Shubi people =

Ethnic group from Kagera Region of Tanzania

The Shubi (also called Washubi) are a Bantu ethnic and linguistic group based in Ngara District of Kagera Region, Tanzania; that speak the Shubi language. In 1987 the Shubi population was estimated to number 153,000. They were traditionally hunters but now are predominantly agriculturalists.
