= Kinyarwanda =

Bantu language official in Rwanda

- Ikinyarwanda
- Pronunciation: /ˌkɪnjərəˈwɑːndə/
- Native to: Rwanda, Uganda
- Ethnicity: Banyarwanda
- Native speakers: 15 million (2014–2024)
- Language family: Niger–Congo?: Atlantic–Congo; Volta-Congo; Benue–Congo; Bantoid; Southern Bantoid; Bantu; Northeast Bantu; Great Lakes Bantu; Western Lakes Bantu; Rwanda-Rundi; Kinyarwanda
- Dialects: Bufumbwa; Ikinyabwishya; Igikiga; Ikinyamurenge; Ikirera; Urufumbira; Urutwatwa; Igifefeko; ikijomba; ikigogwe; ikinyakore
- Writing system: Latin

Official status
- Official language in: Rwanda

Language codes
- ISO 639-1: rw
- ISO 639-2: kin
- ISO 639-3: kin
- Glottolog: kiny1244
- Guthrie code: JD.61
- Linguasphere: 99-AUS-df

- Person: Umunyarwanda
- People: Abanyarwanda
- Language: Ikinyarwanda

Kinyarwanda, officially known as Ikinyarwanda, is a Bantu language and the national language of Rwanda. It is a dialect of the Rwanda-Rundi language that is also spoken in Uganda, where the dialect is known as Ikinyakore, Rufumbira, or Urufumbira. Kinyarwanda is universal among the native population of Rwanda and is mutually intelligible with Kirundi, the national language of neighbouring Burundi.

In 2010, the Rwanda Academy of Language and Culture (RALC) was established to help promote and sustain Kinyarwanda. The organization attempted an orthographic reform in 2014, but it was met with pushback due to their perceived top-down and political nature, among other reasons.

== Geographic distribution ==
Kinyarwanda is spoken in Rwanda, the Democratic Republic of the Congo and Uganda.

== Phonology ==
=== Consonants ===
The table below gives the consonants of Kinyarwanda.

| | | Bilabial | Labio- dental | Alveolar | Post- alveolar | Palatal | Velar | Glottal |
|---|---|---|---|---|---|---|---|---|
| Nasal | | m | | n | | ɲ | | |
| Plosive | voiceless | p^{1} | | t | | | k | |
| Plosive | voiced | | | d | | | ɡ | |
| Affricate | voiceless | | p͡f | t͡s | t͡ʃ | | | |
| Fricative | voiceless | | f | s | ʃ | ç | | h |
| Fricative | voiced | β | v | z | ʒ | | | |
| Approximant | | | | | | j | w | |
| Rhotic | | | | ɾ | | | | |

1. /p/ is only found in loanwords.

=== Vowels ===
The table below gives the vowel sounds of Kinyarwanda.

| | Front | | Central | | Back | |
| | short | long | short | long | short | long |
|---|---|---|---|---|---|---|
| Close | i | iː | | | u | uː |
| Mid | e | eː | | | o | oː |
| Open | | | a | aː | | |

=== Tone ===
Kinyarwanda is a tonal language. Like many Bantu languages, it has a two-way contrast between high and low tones (low-tone syllables may be analyzed as toneless). The realization of tones in Kinyarwanda is influenced by a complex set of phonological rules.

== Orthography ==
| Letter(s) | a | b | c | cy | d | e | f | g | h | i | j | jy | k | m | n | ny | o | p | pf | r | s | sh | shy | t | ts | u | v | w | y | z |
| IPA | a, aː | β, b | t͡ʃ | c | d | e, eː | f | ɡ, ɟ | h, ɦ | i, iː | ʒ | ɟ | k, c | m | n, ŋ | ɲ | o, oː | p | p͡f | ɾ | s | ʃ | ç | t | t͡s | u, uː | v | w | j | z |

Except in a few morphological contexts, the sequences 'ki' and 'ke' may be pronounced interchangeably as [ki] and [ke] or [ci] and [ce] according to speaker's preference.

The letters ⟨a, e, i⟩ at the end of a word followed by a word starting with a vowel often follows a pattern of omission in common speech (sandhi), though the orthography remains the same. Consider the following excerpt of the Rwandan anthem: Reka tukurate tukuvuge ibigwi wowe utubumbiye hamwe twese Abanyarwanda uko watubyaye berwa, sugira, singizwa iteka. would be pronounced as Reka tukurate tukuvug' ibigwi wow' utubumiye hamwe twes' abanyarwand' uko watubyaye berwa, sugira singizw' iteka.

There are some discrepancies in pronunciation from orthographic Cw and Cy. The glides /w j/ strengthen to stops in consonant clusters. For example, rw (as in Rwanda) is normally pronounced [ɾɡw]. The differences are the following:

| Orthography | Pronunciation |
|---|---|
| mw | [mŋ] |
| nw | [nŋw] |
| nyw | [ɲŋw] or [ŋwa] |
| pw | [pk] |
| fw | [fk] |
| pfw | [p͡fk] |
| bw | [bɡ] |
| vw | [vɡ] |
| tw | [tkw] |
| tsw | [t͡skw] |
| cw | [t͡ʃkw] |
| sw | [skw] |
| shw | [ʃkw] |
| dw | [dɡw] |
| zw | [zɡw] |
| jw | [ʒɡw] |
| rw | [ɾɡw] |
| my | [mɲ] |
| py | [pc] |
| ty | [tc] |
| sy | [sc] |
| by | [bɟ] |
| ndy | [ndɟ] |
| ry | [ɾɟ] |

These are all sequences; [bɡ], for example, is not labial-velar [ɡ͡b]. Even when Rwanda is pronounced [ɾwaːnda] rather than [ɾɡwaːnda], the onset is a sequence, not a labialized [ɾʷ].

== Grammar ==
=== Nouns ===
Kinyarwanda uses 16 of the Bantu noun classes. Sometimes these are grouped into 10 pairs so that most singular and plural forms of the same word are included in the same class. The table below shows the 16 noun classes and how they are paired in two commonly used systems.

| Prefix | Classification | | | Number | Typical words | Example |
| Prefix | Bantu | Cox | ??? | Number | Typical words | Example |
|---|---|---|---|---|---|---|
| umu- | 1 | 1 | | singular | humans | umuntu – person |
| aba- | 2 | 1 | | plural | humans | abantu – people |
| umu- | 3 | 2 | | singular | trees, shrubs and things that extend | umusozi – hill |
| imi- | 4 | 2 | | plural | trees, shrubs and things that extend | imisozi – hills |
| iri- | 5 | 5 | 3 | singular | things in quantities, liquids | iryinyo – tooth |
| ama- | 6 | 5/8/9 | 3/8/9 | plural (also substances) | things in quantities, liquids | amenyo – teeth |
| iki- | 7 | 4 | | singular | generic, large, or abnormal things | ikintu – thing |
| ibi- | 8 | 4 | | plural | generic, large, or abnormal things | ibintu – things |
| in- | 9 | 3 | 5 | singular | some plants, animals and household implements | inka – cow |
| in- | 10 | 3/6 | 5/6 | plural | some plants, animals and household implements | inka – cows |
| uru- | 11 | 6 | | singular | mixture, body parts | urugo – home |
| aka- | 12 | 7 | | singular | diminutive forms of other nouns | akantu – little thing |
| utu- | 13 | 7 | | plural | diminutive forms of other nouns | utuntu – little things |
| ubu- | 14 | 8 | | n/a | abstract nouns, qualities or states | ubuntu – generosity |
| uku- | 15 | 9 | | n/a | actions, verbal nouns and gerunds | ukuntu – means |
| aha- | 16 | 10 | | n/a | places, locations | ahantu – place |

=== Verbs ===
All Kinyarwanda verb infinitives begin with ku- (morphed into k(w)- before vowels, and into gu- before stems beginning with a voiceless consonant due to Dahl's Law). To conjugate, the infinitive prefix is removed and replaced with a prefix agreeing with the subject. Then a tense marker can be inserted.

| | Singular | | | Plural | | |
| | Corresp. Noun Class | before consonants | before vowels | Corresp. Noun Class | before consonants | before vowels |
|---|---|---|---|---|---|---|
| 1st person | | n-/m- | n- | | tu-/du- | tw- |
| 2nd person | | u- | w- | | mu- | mw- |
| I | 1 | a- | y- | 2 | ba- | b- |
| II | 3 | u- | w- | 4 | i- | y- |
| III | 5 | ri- | ry- | 6 | a- | y- |
| IV | 7 | ki- | cy- | 8 | bi- | by- |
| V | 9 | i- | y- | 10 | zi- | z- |
| VI | 11 | ru- | rw- | 10 | zi- | z- |
| VII | 12 | ka- | k- | 13 | tu- | tw- |
| VIII | 14 | bu- | bw- | 16 | bu- | bw- |
| IX | 15 | ku- | k(w)- | 16 | a- | y- |
| X | 16 | ha- | h- | 16 | ha- | h- |

The class I prefixes y-/a- and ba- correspond to the third person for persons. The personal prefix n- becomes m- before a labial sound (p, b, f, v), while personal prefix tu- becomes du- under Dahl's Law.

| | Singular | | Plural | |
| | Full pronoun | Subject prefix | Full pronoun | Subject prefix |
|---|---|---|---|---|
| 1st person | njye(we) | n-/m- | mwe(bwe) | tu-/du- |
| 2nd person | wowe | u-/w- | twe(bwe) | mu-/mw- |
| 3rd person | we | a-/y- | bo | ba- |

Every regular verb has three stems: the imperfective (ending in the morpheme -a), the perfective (ending in the morpheme -:ye, which may trigger a variety of morphophonological changes in the preceding segment) and the subjunctive (ending in the morpheme -e).

According to Botne (1983), a verb may belong to any of eight Aktionsart categories, which may be broadly grouped into stative and dynamic categories. In the immediate tense, dynamic verbs take the imperfective stem while stative verbs take the perfective stem, while both use the imperfective stem in the habitual or gnomic tense.

Simple tense/mood markers include the following:

- With the present stem:
  - Present ('I do'): - (no infix)
  - Present Progressive ('I am doing'): -ra- (assimilates to -da- when preceded by n)
  - Habitual Past ('I used to do/was doing'): -a- plus -ga suffixed to the verb
  - Future ('I will do'): -za-
- With the past stem:
  - Polite Imperative ('Let me do'; 'please do'): - (no infix)
  - Perfect ('I have done/I did'): -a-
  - Near Past ('I just did'): -ra- (assimilates to -da- when preceded by n)
  - Preterite ('I did'): -ara-
  - Subjunctive ('that I do/did'): -za-

Object affixes corresponding to the noun classes of an object may be placed after the tense marker and before the verb stem:

| | Singular | | | Plural | | |
| | Corresp. Noun Class | before consonants | before vowels | Corresp. Noun Class | before consonants | before vowels |
|---|---|---|---|---|---|---|
| 1st person | | -n-/-m- | -ny- | | -tu-/-du- | -tw- |
| 2nd person | | -ku-/-gu- | -kw- | | -ba- | -b- |
| I | 1 | -mu- | -mw- | 2 | -ba- | -b- |
| II | 3 | -wu- | -w- | 4 | -yi- | -y- |
| III | 5 | -ri- | -ry- | 6 | -ya- | -y- |
| IV | 7 | -ki- | -cy- | 8 | -bi- | -by- |
| V | 9 | -yi- | -y- | 16 | -zi- | -z- |
| VI | 11 | -ru- | -rw- | 10 | -zi- | -z- |
| VII | 12 | -ka-/-ga- | -k- | 13 | -tu-/-du- | -tw- |
| VIII | 14 | -bu- | -bw- | 16 | -ya- | -y- |
| IX | 15 | -ku-/-gu- | -kw- | 16 | -ya- | -y- |
| X | 16 | -ha- | -h- | 16 | -ha- | -h- |

The personal object affixes are as follows:

| | Singular | | Plural | |
| | Full pronoun | Object affix | Full pronoun | Object affix |
|---|---|---|---|---|
| 1st person | njye(we) | -n-/-m- (cons.) -ny- (vowel) | mwebwe | tu-/du- (cons.) -tw- (vowel) |
| 2nd person | wowe | -ku-/-gu- (cons.) -kw- (vowel) | twe(bwe) | -ba- (cons.) -b- (vowel) |
| 3rd person | we | -mu- (cons.) -mw- (vowel) | bo | -ba- (cons.) -b- (vowel) |

=== Causatives ===
Kinyarwanda employs the use of periphrastic causatives, in addition to morphological causatives.

The periphrastic causatives use the verbs -teer- and -tum-, which mean cause. With -teer-, the original subject becomes the object of the main clause, leaving the original verb in the infinitive (just like in English):

Ábáana b-a-gii-ye.
children they-PST-go-ASP
"The children left."

Umugabo y-a-tee-ye ábáana ku-geend-a.
man he-PST-cause-ASP children INF-go-ASP
"The man caused the children to go.

In this construction, the original S can be deleted.

Abantu ba-rá-bon-a.
people they-PRES-see-ASP
"People see"

Ku-geenda gu-teer-a (abaantu) ku-bona.
INF-go it-cause-ASP (people) INF-see
"To travel causes to see."

With -túm-, the original S remains in the embedded clause and the original verb is still marked for person and tense:

N-a-andits-e amábárúwa meênshi.
I-PST-write-ASP letters many
"I wrote many letters."

Umukoôbwa y-a-tum-ye n-á-andik-a amábárúwa meênshi.
girl she-PST-cause-ASP I-PST-write-ASP letters many
"The girl caused me to write many letters."

Derivational causatives use the instrumental marker -iish-. The construction is the same, but it is instrumental when the subject is inanimate and it is causative when the subject is animate:

Umugabo a-ra-andik-iish-a umugabo íbárúwa.
man he-PRES-write-CAUS-ASP man letter
"The man is making the man write a letter."

Umugabo a-ra-andik-iish-a íkárámu íbárúwa.
man he-PRES-write-INSTR-ASP pen letter
"The man is writing a letter with the pen."

This morpheme can be applied to intransitives (3) or transitives (4):

Ábáana ba-rá-ryáam-ye.
children they-PRES-sleep-ASP
"The children are sleeping."

Umugóre a-ryaam-iish-ije ábáana
woman she-sleep-CAUS-ASP children
"The woman is putting the children to sleep."

Ábáana ba-ra-som-a ibitabo.
children they-PRES-read-ASP books
"The children are reading the books."

Umugabo a-ra-som-eesh-a ábáana ibitabo.
man he-PRES-read-CAUS-ASP children books
"The man is making the children read the books."

However, there can only be one animate direct object. If a sentence has two, one or both is deleted and understood from context.

The suffix -iish- implies an indirect causation (similar to English have in "I had him write a paper), while other causatives imply a direct causation (similar to English make in "I made him write a paper").

One of these more direct causation devices is the deletion of what is called a "neutral" morpheme -ik-, which indicates state or potentiality. Stems with the -ik- removed can take -iish, but the causation is less direct:

| -mének- | "be broken" | -mén- | "break" | -méneesh- | "have (something) broken" |
| -sáduk- | "be cut" | -sátur- | "cut" | -sátuz- | "have (something) cut" |

Another direct causation maker is -y- which is used for some verbs:

Ámáazi a-rá-shyúuh-a.
water it-PRES-warm-ASP
"The water is being warmed."

Umugóre a-rá-shyúush-y-a ámáazi.
woman she-PRES-warm-CAUS-ASP water
"The woman is warming the water."

Umugabo a-rá-shyúuh-iish-a umugóre ámáazi
man he-PRES-warm-CAUS-ASP woman water
"The man is having the woman warm the water.
