= Kagera =

Kagera may refer to:

- Kagera Region in Tanzania
- Kagera River, originating in Burundi and flowing into Lake Victoria
- Kagera, Kigoma-Ujiji, a ward in Kigoma-Ujiji District, Tanzania
- Kagera, Ukerewe, a ward in Ukerewe District, Tanzania
- Akagera National Park in Rwanda
