= Rusimbi =

Ward in Kigoma-Ujiji District, Kigoma Region

Rusimbi Kata ya Rusimbi (Swahili)
- Ward
- Kata ya Rusimbi, Wilaya ya Kigoma-Ujiji
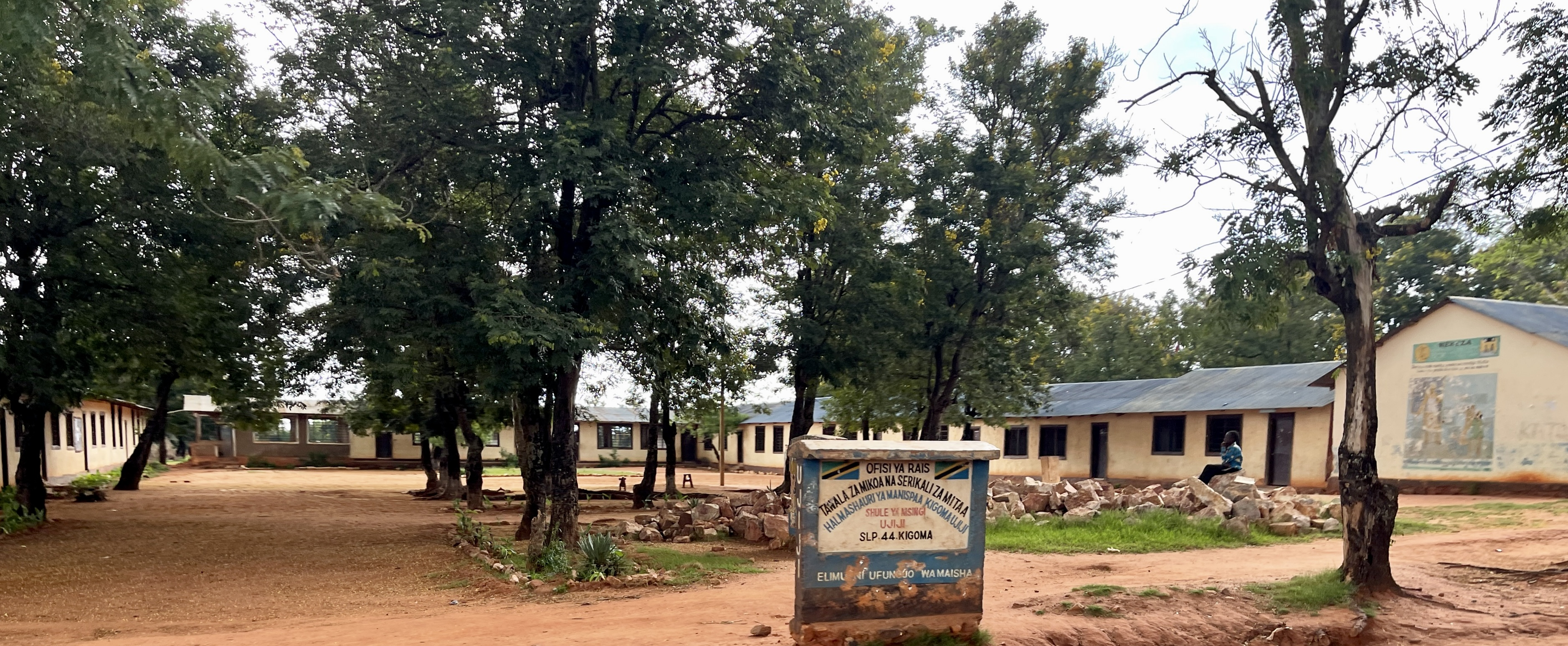
- Ujiji Primary School in Rusimbi Ward, Kigoma-Ujiji

- Location within Tanzania
- Country: Tanzania
- Region: Kigoma Region
- District: Kigoma-Ujiji District

Area
  - Total: 0.7 km^{2} (0.27 sq mi)
- Elevation: 783 m (2,569 ft)

Population (2016)
  - Total: 7,462
  - Density: 11,000/km^{2} (28,000/sq mi)
- Tanzanian Postal Code: 47114

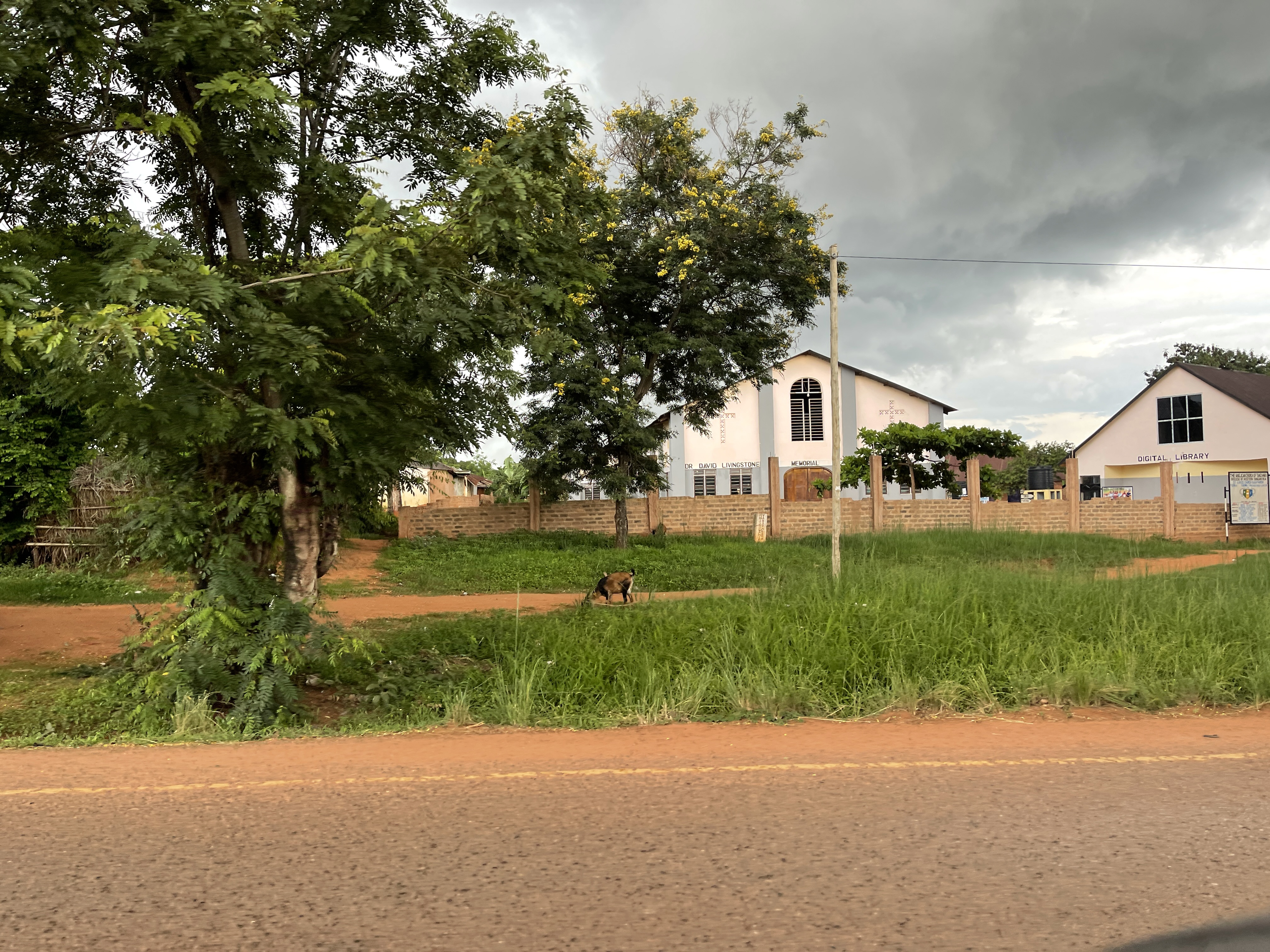
Scene in Rusimbi Ward, Kigoma-Ujiji

Rusimbi is an administrative ward in Kigoma-Ujiji District of Kigoma Region in Tanzania. The ward covers an area of 0.7 km^{2} (0.27 sq mi), and has an average elevation of 783 m (2,569 ft). In 2016 the Tanzania National Bureau of Statistics report there were 7,462 people in the ward, from 6,779 in 2012.

== Villages / neighborhoods ==
The ward has 5 neighborhoods.

- Burega
- Kawawa
- Lake Tanganyika
- Sokoine
- Taifa
