= Kigoma-Ujiji District =

District of Kigoma Region, Tanzania

Kigoma-Ujiji Wilaya ya Kigoma-Ujiji (Swahili)
- District
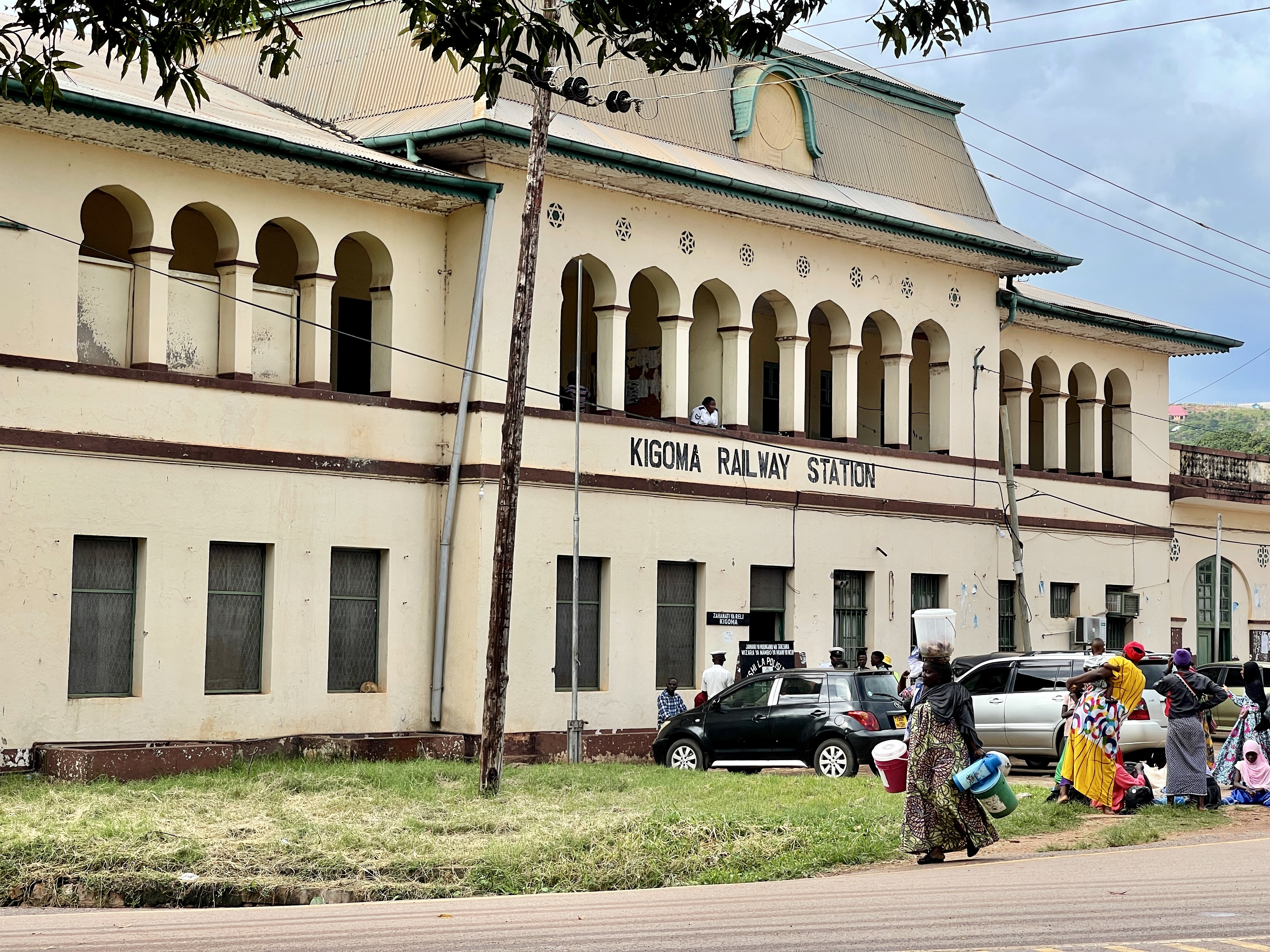
- Kigoma Railway Station, Kigoma Ward, Kigoma-Ujiji District

- Kigoma-Ujiji District location within Kigoma Region
- Coordinates: 04°52′56.64″S 29°39′41.4″E
- Country: Tanzania
- Region: Kigoma Region
- Capital: Kigoma

Area
  - Total: 92.7 km^{2} (35.8 sq mi)

Population (2012)
  - Total: 215,458
  - Density: 2,320/km^{2} (6,020/sq mi)
- Demonym: Kigoma-Ujijian

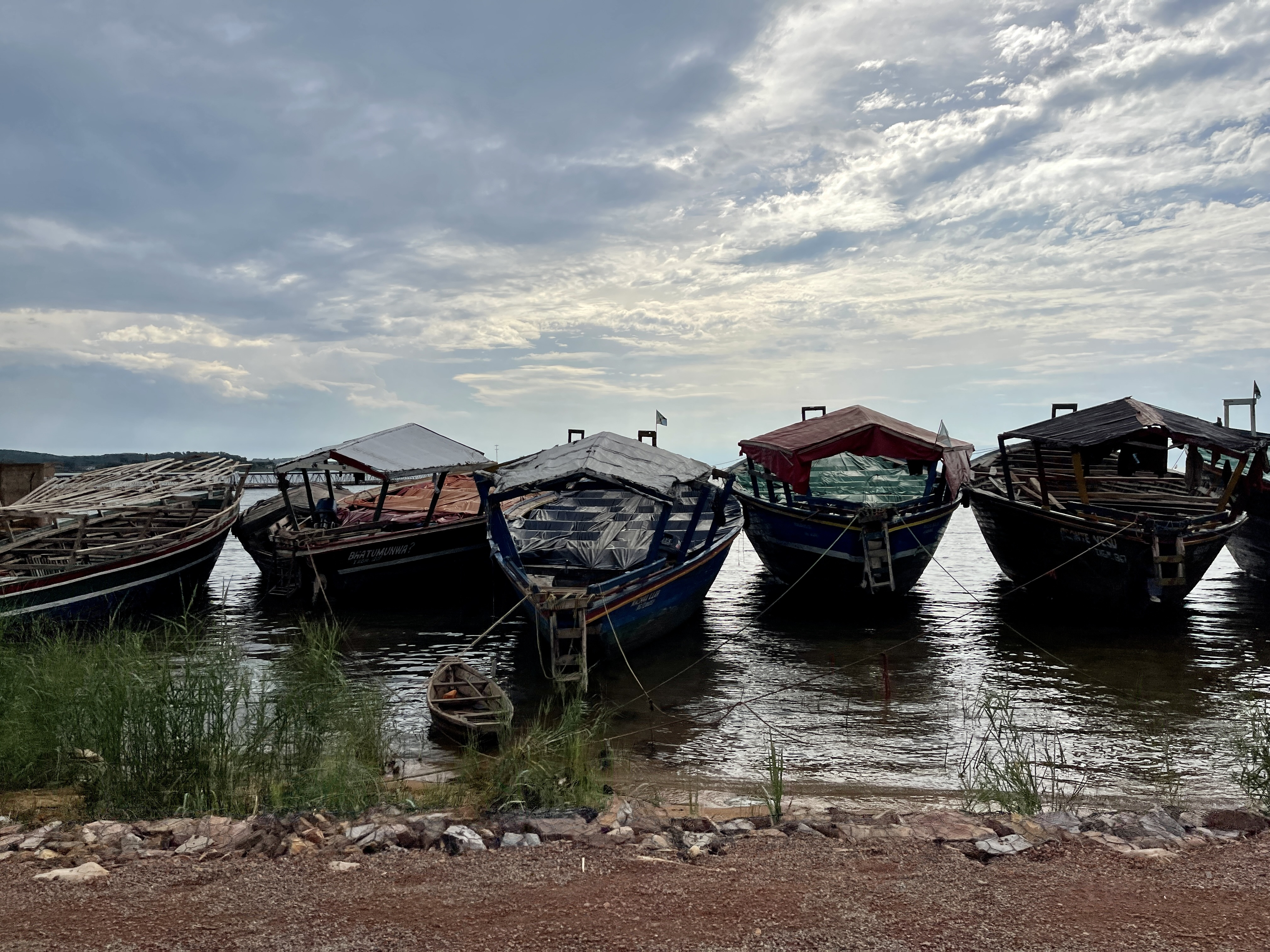
Fishing Boats in Kibirizi Ward

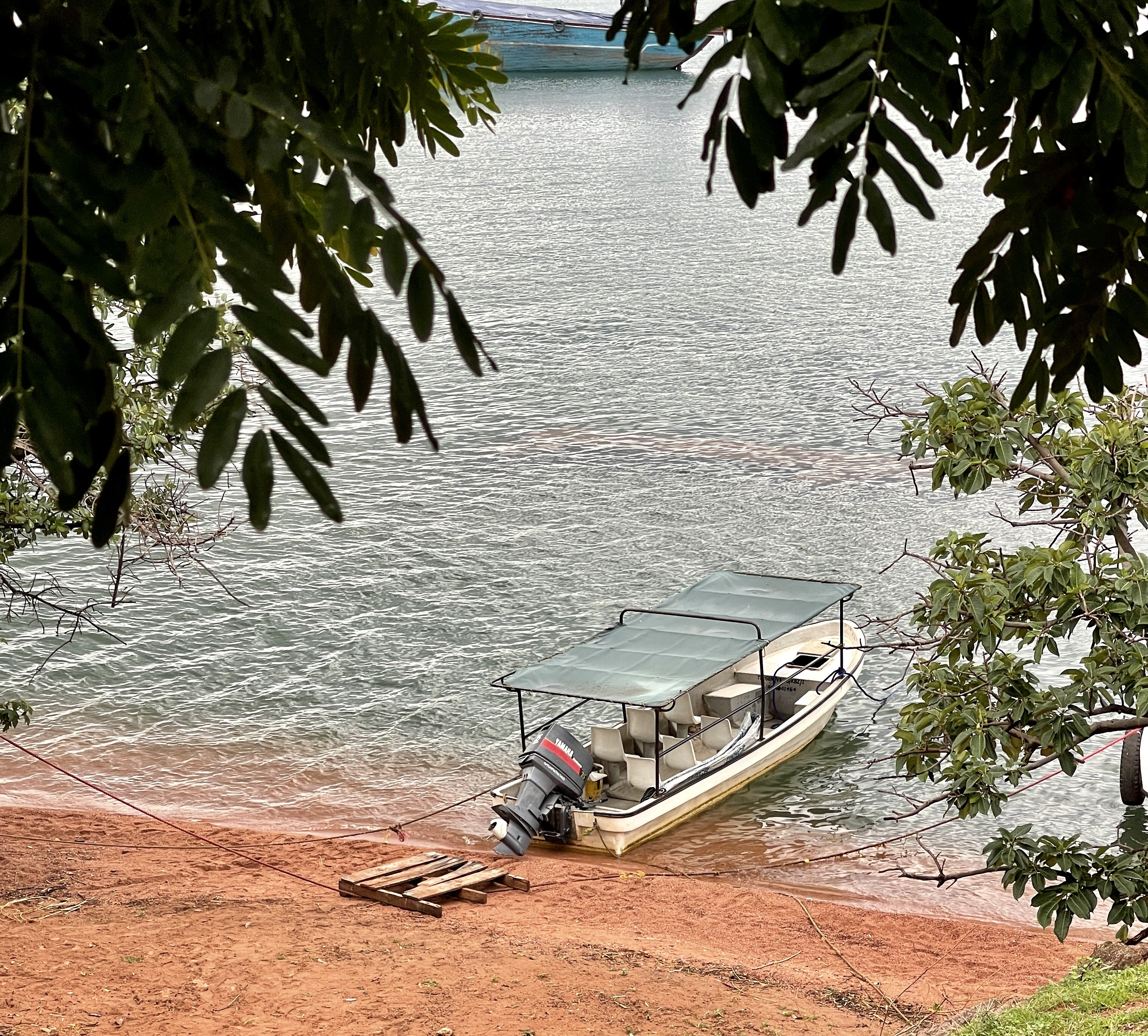
Gombe boats in Kibirizi Ward, Kigoma-Ujiji

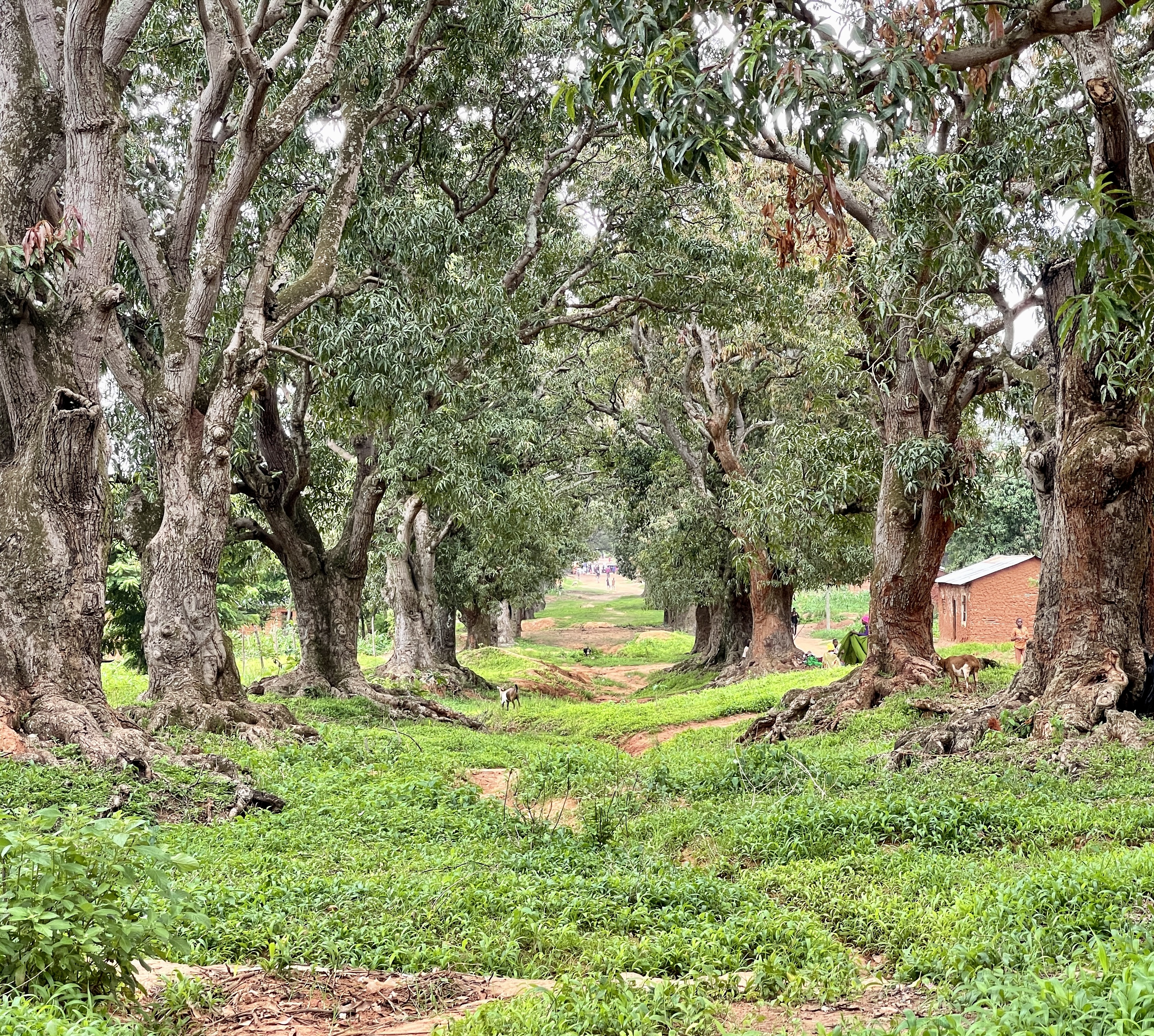
Mango Row, Kagera Ward, Kigoma-Ujiji

Kigoma-Ujiji District is one of the eight administrative districts of Kigoma Region in Tanzania. The District covers an area of 92.7 km^{2} (35.8 sq mi). It is bordered to the west by Uvinza District in the south east and to the north by Kigoma District. The western shore of lake Tanganyika surrounds the district on the west. According to the 2012 census, the district has a total population of 215,458.

== Administrative subdivisions ==
As of 2012, Kigoma-Ujiji District was administratively divided into 19 wards.

=== Wards ===
- Bangwe
- Buhanda
- Businde
- Buzebazeba
- Gungu
- Kagera
- Kasimbu
- Kasingirima
- Katubuka
- Kibirizi
- Kigoma
- Kipampa
- Kitongoni
- Machinjioni
- Majengo
- Mwanga Kaskazini
- Mwanga Kusini
- Rubuga
- Rusimbi
