= Majengo, Kigoma =

Ward in Kigoma-Ujiji District, Kigoma Region

Majengo Kata ya Majengo (Swahili)
- Ward
- Kata ya Majengo, Wilaya ya Kigoma-Ujiji
- Location within Tanzania
- Country: Tanzania
- Region: Kigoma Region
- District: Kigoma-Ujiji District

Area
  - Total: 0.5 km^{2} (0.19 sq mi)
- Elevation: 784 m (2,572 ft)

Population (2016)
  - Total: 4,765
  - Density: 9,500/km^{2} (25,000/sq mi)
- Tanzanian Postal Code: 47110

Majengo is an administrative ward in Kigoma-Ujiji District of Kigoma Region in Tanzania. The ward covers an area of 1.1 km^{2} (0.42 sq mi), and has an average elevation of 784 m (2,572 ft). In 2016 the Tanzania National Bureau of Statistics report there were 4,765 people in the ward, from 4,329 in 2012.

== Villages / neighborhoods ==
The ward has 4 neighborhoods.

- Bogogwa
- Bonde
- Katonyanga
- Rusimbi
