= Katubuka =

Ward in Kigoma-Ujiji District, Kigoma Region

Katubuka Kata ya Katubuka (Swahili)
- Ward
- Kata ya Katubuka, Wilaya ya Kigoma-Ujiji
- Location within Tanzania
- Country: Tanzania
- Region: Kigoma Region
- District: Kigoma-Ujiji District

Area
  - Total: 3 km^{2} (1.2 sq mi)
- Elevation: 814 m (2,671 ft)

Population (2016)
  - Total: 27,287
  - Density: 9,100/km^{2} (24,000/sq mi)
- Tanzanian Postal Code: 47115

Katubuka is an administrative ward in Kigoma-Ujiji District of Kigoma Region in Tanzania. The ward covers an area of 3 km^{2} (1.2 sq mi), and has an average elevation of 814 m (2,671 ft). In 2016 the Tanzania National Bureau of Statistics report there were 27,287 people in the ward, from 24,790 in 2012.

== Villages / neighborhoods ==
The ward has 3 neighborhoods.

- Katubuka
- Mwanga sokoni
- Uwanja ndege
