= Businde =

Ward in Kigoma-Ujiji District, Kigoma Region

Businde Kata ya Businde (Swahili)
- Ward
- Kata ya Businde, Wilaya ya Kigoma-Ujiji
- Location within Tanzania
- Country: Tanzania
- Region: Kigoma Region
- District: Kigoma-Ujiji District

Area
  - Total: 7.8 km^{2} (3.0 sq mi)
- Elevation: 808 m (2,651 ft)

Population (2012)
  - Total: 2,436
  - Density: 310/km^{2} (810/sq mi)
- Tanzanian Postal Code: 47119

Businde is an administrative ward in Kigoma-Ujiji District of Kigoma Region in Tanzania. The ward covers an area of 7.8 km^{2} (3.0 sq mi), and has an average elevation of 808 m (2,651 ft). In 2016 the Tanzania National Bureau of Statistics report there were 2,681 people in the ward, from 2,436 in 2012.

== Villages / neighborhoods ==
The ward has 9 villages and neighborhoods.

- Bidyoha
- Kirugu
- Kitwalo
- Mnazimoja
- Msikitini
- Mwanzini
- Pima
- Rubabi
- Toro
