= Kasingirima =

Ward in Kigoma-Ujiji District, Kigoma Region

Kasingirima Kata ya Kasingirima (Swahili)
- Ward
- Kata ya Kasingirima, Wilaya ya Kigoma-Ujiji
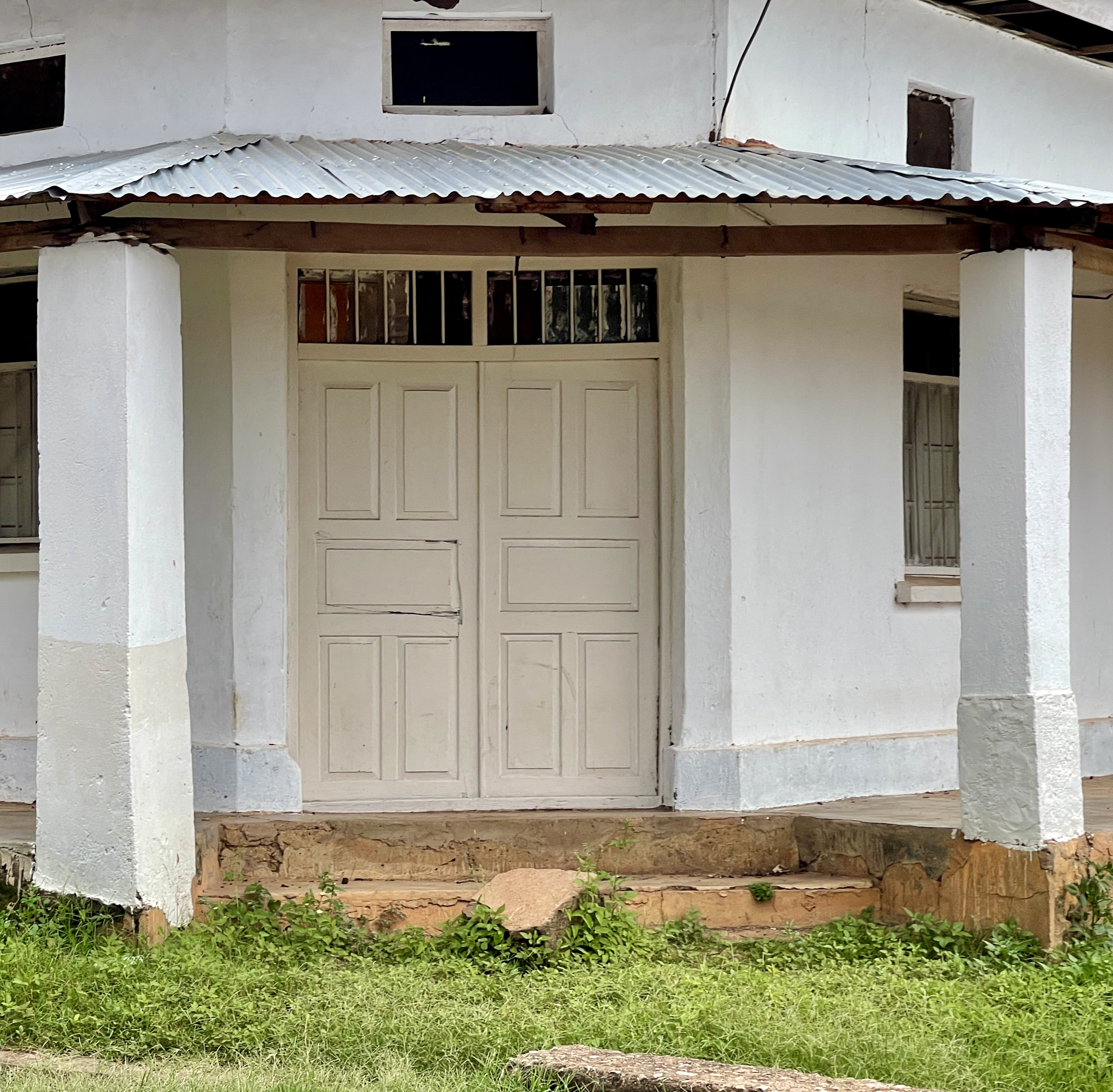
- Swahili House in Kasingirima Ward, Kigoma-Ujiji

- Location within Tanzania
- Country: Tanzania
- Region: Kigoma Region
- District: Kigoma-Ujiji District

Area
  - Total: 0.2 km^{2} (0.077 sq mi)
- Elevation: 799 m (2,621 ft)

Population (2016)
  - Total: 3,156
  - Density: 16,000/km^{2} (41,000/sq mi)
- Tanzanian Postal Code: 47108

Kasingirima is an administrative ward in Kigoma-Ujiji District of Kigoma Region in Tanzania. The ward covers an area of 0.2 km^{2} (0.077 sq mi), and has an average elevation of 799 m (2,621 ft). In 2016, the Tanzania National Bureau of Statistics report there were 3,156 people in the ward, from 2,867 in 2012.

== Villages / neighborhoods ==
The ward has 4 neighborhoods.

- Livingstone
- Matofalini
- Kasuki
- Mgombewa
