= Buzebazeba =

Ward in Kigoma-Ujiji District, Kigoma Region

Buzebazeba Kata ya Buzebazeba (Swahili)
- Ward
- Kata ya Buzebazeba, Wilaya ya Kigoma-Ujiji
- Location within Tanzania
- Country: Tanzania
- Region: Kigoma Region
- District: Kigoma-Ujiji District

Area
  - Total: 4.2 km^{2} (1.6 sq mi)
- Elevation: 792 m (2,598 ft)

Population (2016)
  - Total: 20,304
  - Density: 4,800/km^{2} (13,000/sq mi)
- Tanzanian Postal Code: 47119

Buzebazeba is an administrative ward in Kigoma-Ujiji District of Kigoma Region in Tanzania. The ward covers an area of 7.8 km^{2} (3.0 sq mi), and has an average elevation of 792 m (2,598 ft). In 2016 the Tanzania National Bureau of Statistics report there were 20,304 people in the ward, from 18,446 in 2012.

== Villages / neighborhoods ==
The ward has 15 villages and neighborhoods.

- Burega
- Jumbe
- Karuta
- Lake tanganyika
- Lumumba
- Mandela
- Mikoroshini
- Ngwandu
- Samora
- Shindika
- Sokoine
- Tanu
- Vamia
