= Kipampa =

Ward in Kigoma-Ujiji District, Kigoma Region

Kipampa Kata ya Kipampa (Swahili)
- Ward
- Kata ya Kipampa, Wilaya ya Kigoma-Ujiji
- Location within Tanzania
- Country: Tanzania
- Region: Kigoma Region
- District: Kigoma-Ujiji District

Area
  - Total: 1.8 km^{2} (0.69 sq mi)
- Elevation: 777 m (2,549 ft)

Population (2016)
  - Total: 8,714
  - Density: 4,800/km^{2} (13,000/sq mi)
- Tanzanian Postal Code: 47118

Kipampa is an administrative ward in Kigoma-Ujiji District of Kigoma Region in Tanzania. The ward covers an area of 1.8 km^{2} (0.69 sq mi), and has an average elevation of 777 m (2,549 ft). In 2016 the Tanzania National Bureau of Statistics report there were 8,714 people in the ward, from 7,917 in 2012.

== Villages / neighborhoods ==
The ward has 4 neighborhoods.

- Boiharo
- Kawawa
- Kazaroho
- Rutale
