= Kitongoni =

Ward in Kigoma-Ujiji District, Kigoma Region

Kitongoni Kata ya Kitongoni (Swahili)
- Ward
- Kata ya Kitongoni, Wilaya ya Kigoma-Ujiji
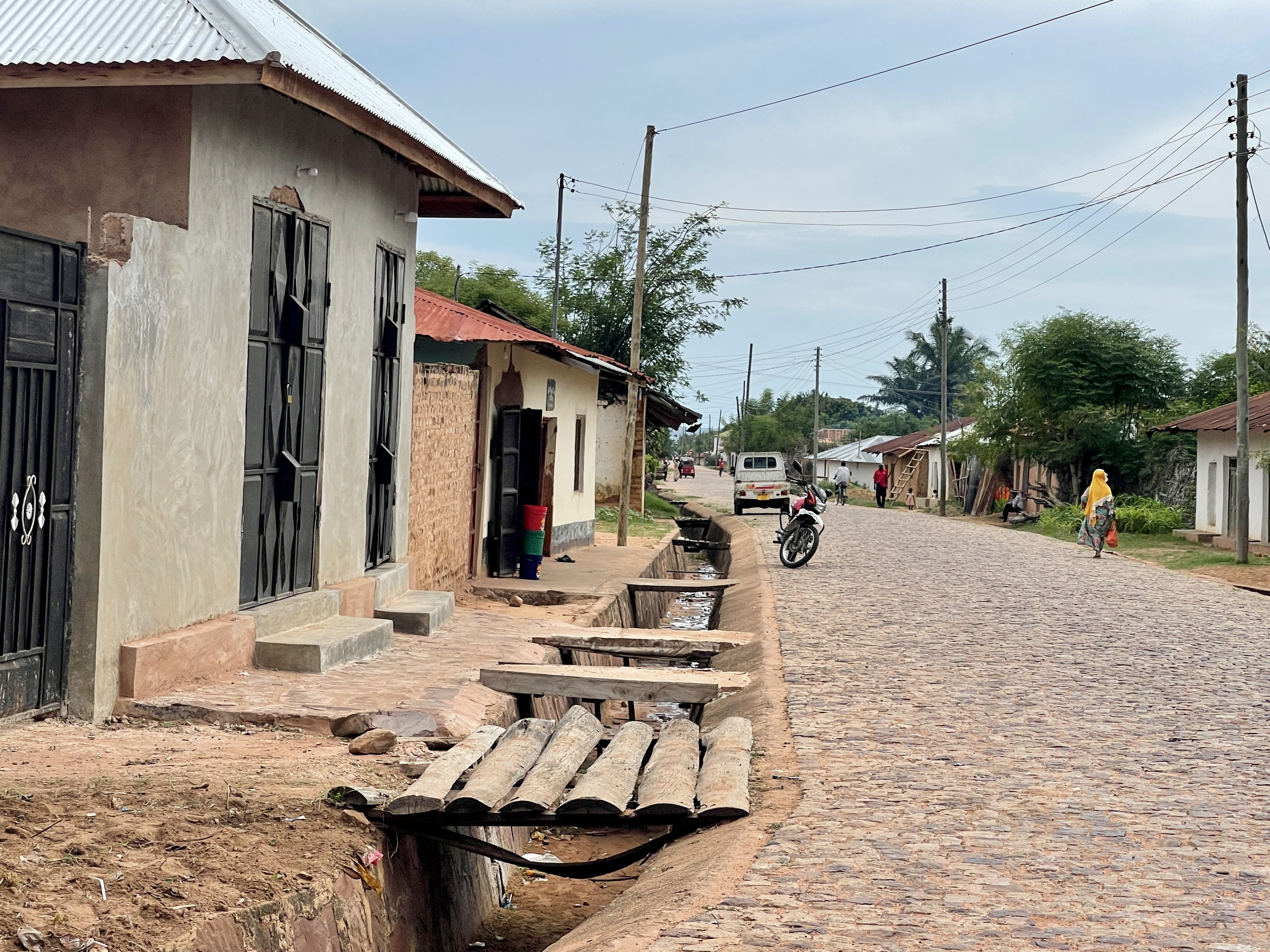
- Old cobble street in Kitongoni Ward, Kigoma-Ujiji

- Location within Tanzania
- Country: Tanzania
- Region: Kigoma Region
- District: Kigoma-Ujiji District

Area
  - Total: 1.2 km^{2} (0.46 sq mi)
- Elevation: 773 m (2,536 ft)

Population (2016)
  - Total: 7,675
  - Density: 6,400/km^{2} (17,000/sq mi)
- Tanzanian Postal Code: 47107

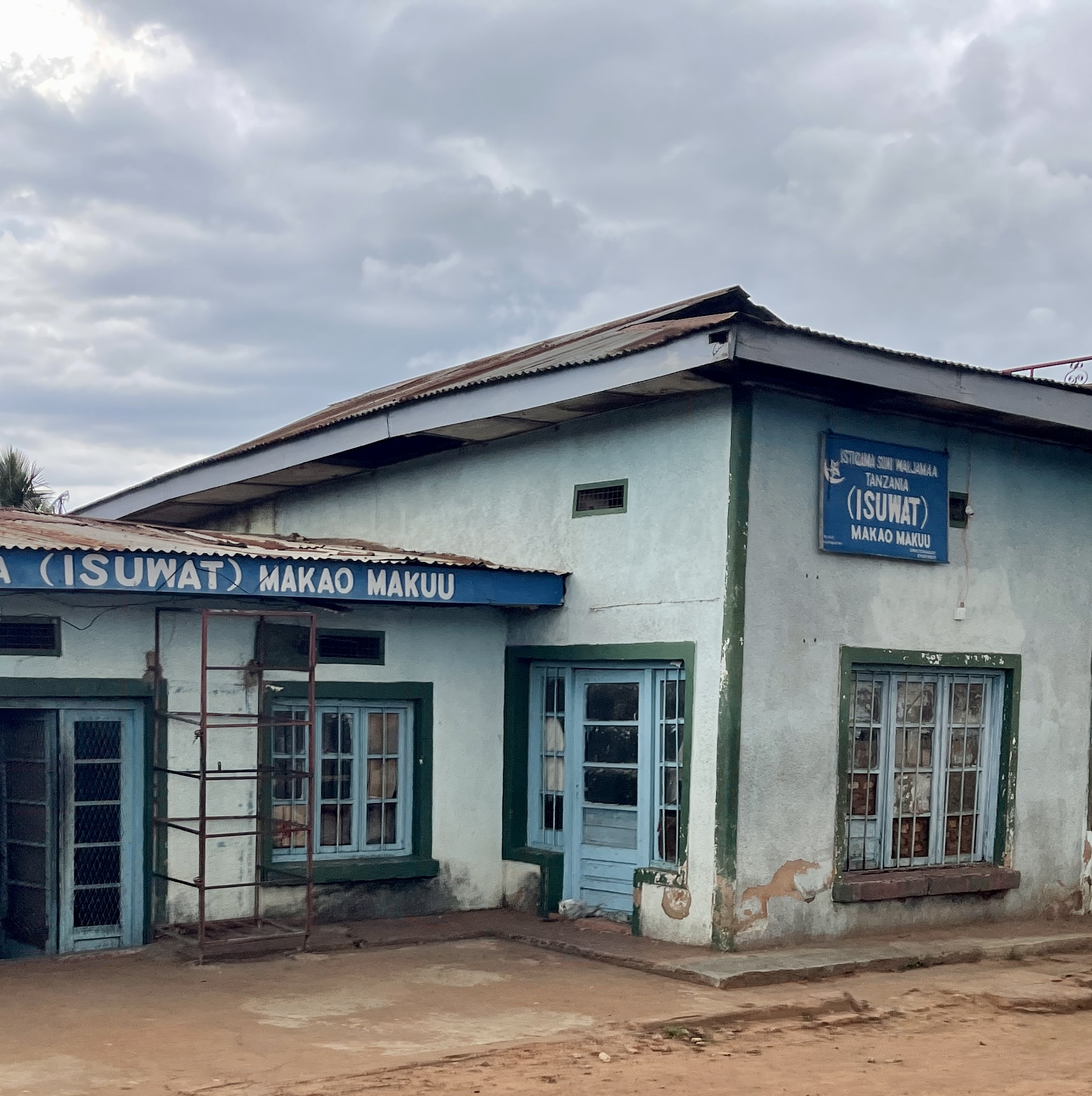
Old Building in Kitongoni Ward, Kigoma-Ujiji

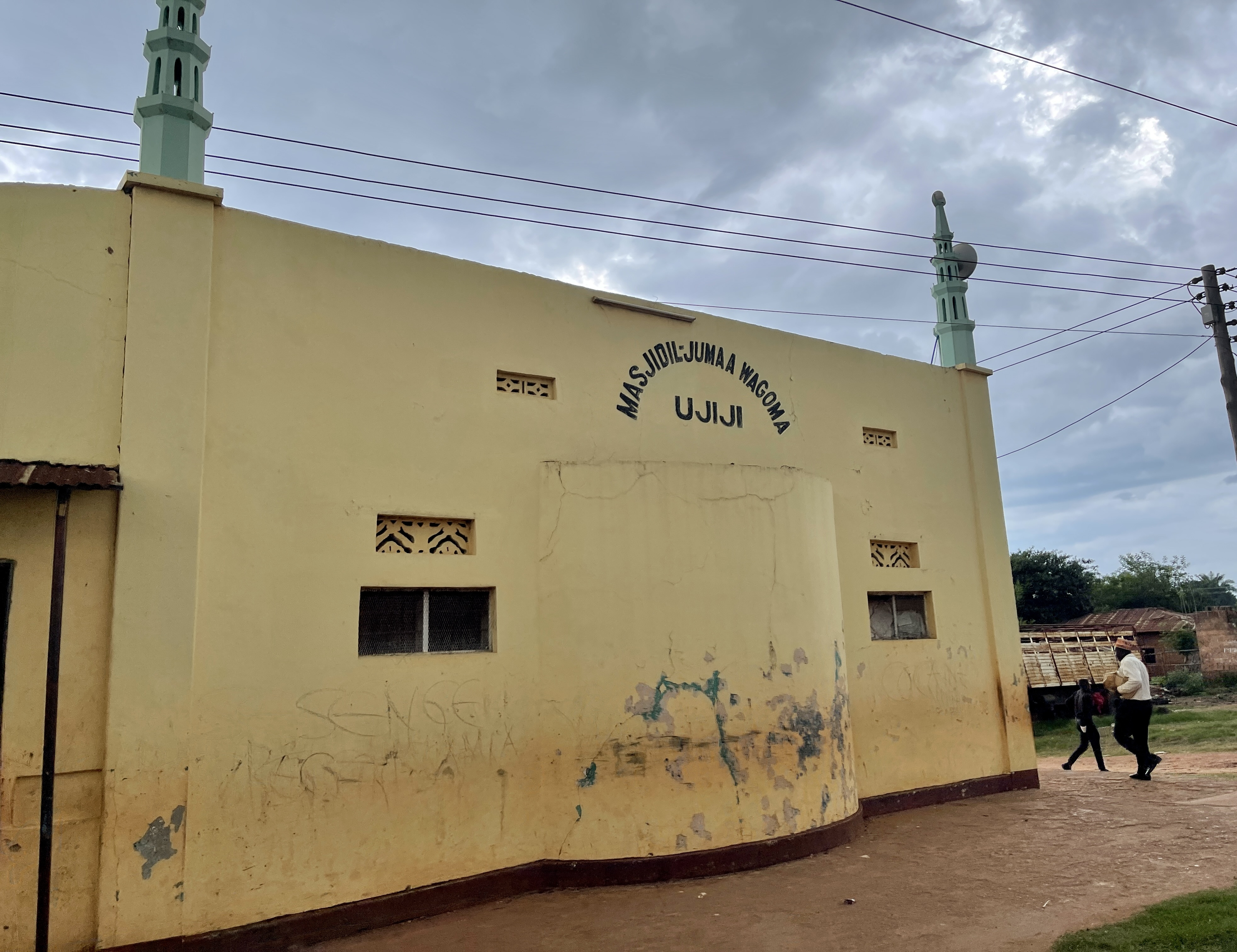
Old Mosque in Kitongoni Ward, Kigoma-Ujiji

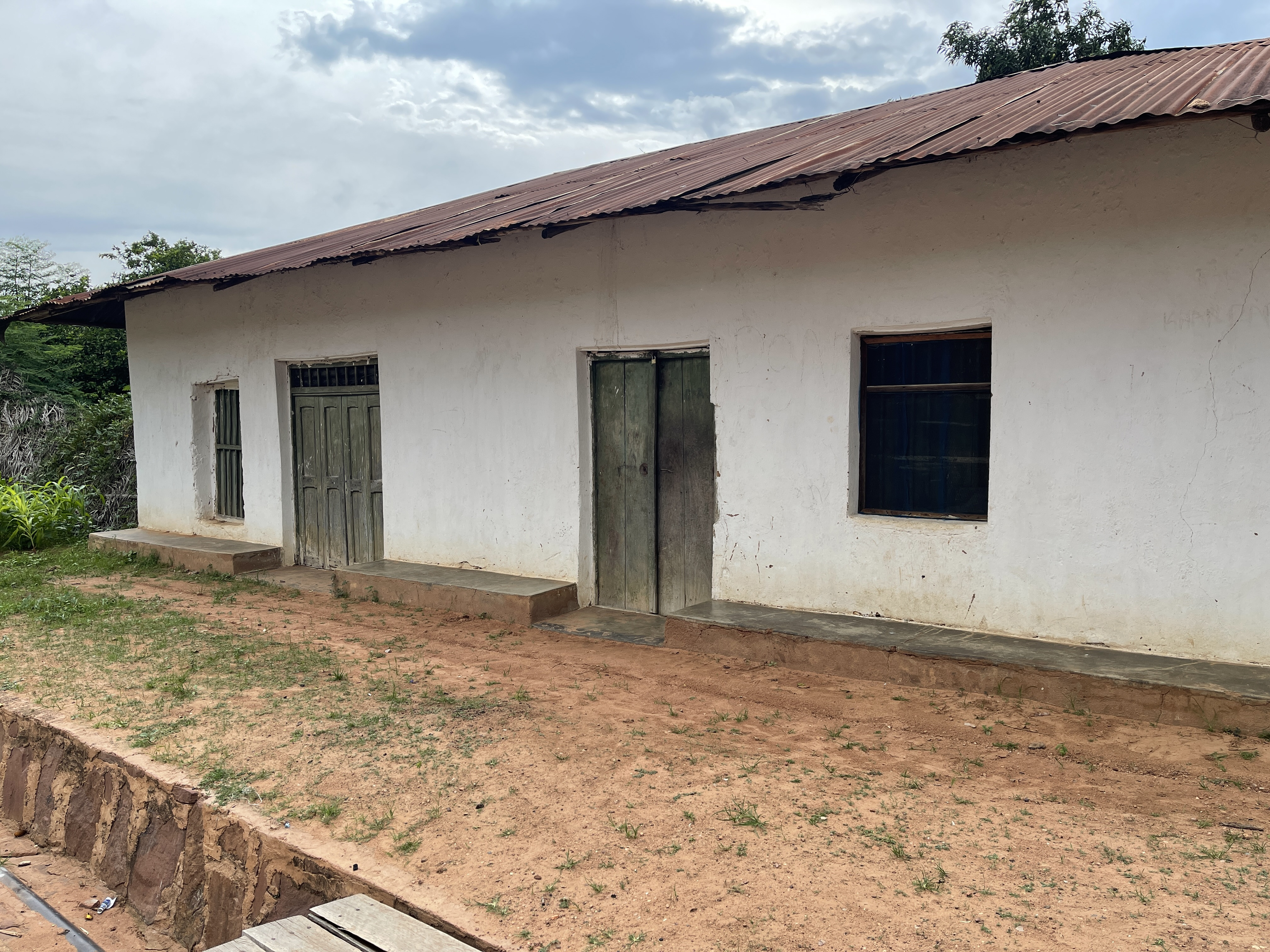
Old Nyerere House in Kitongoni Ward, Kigoma-Ujiji

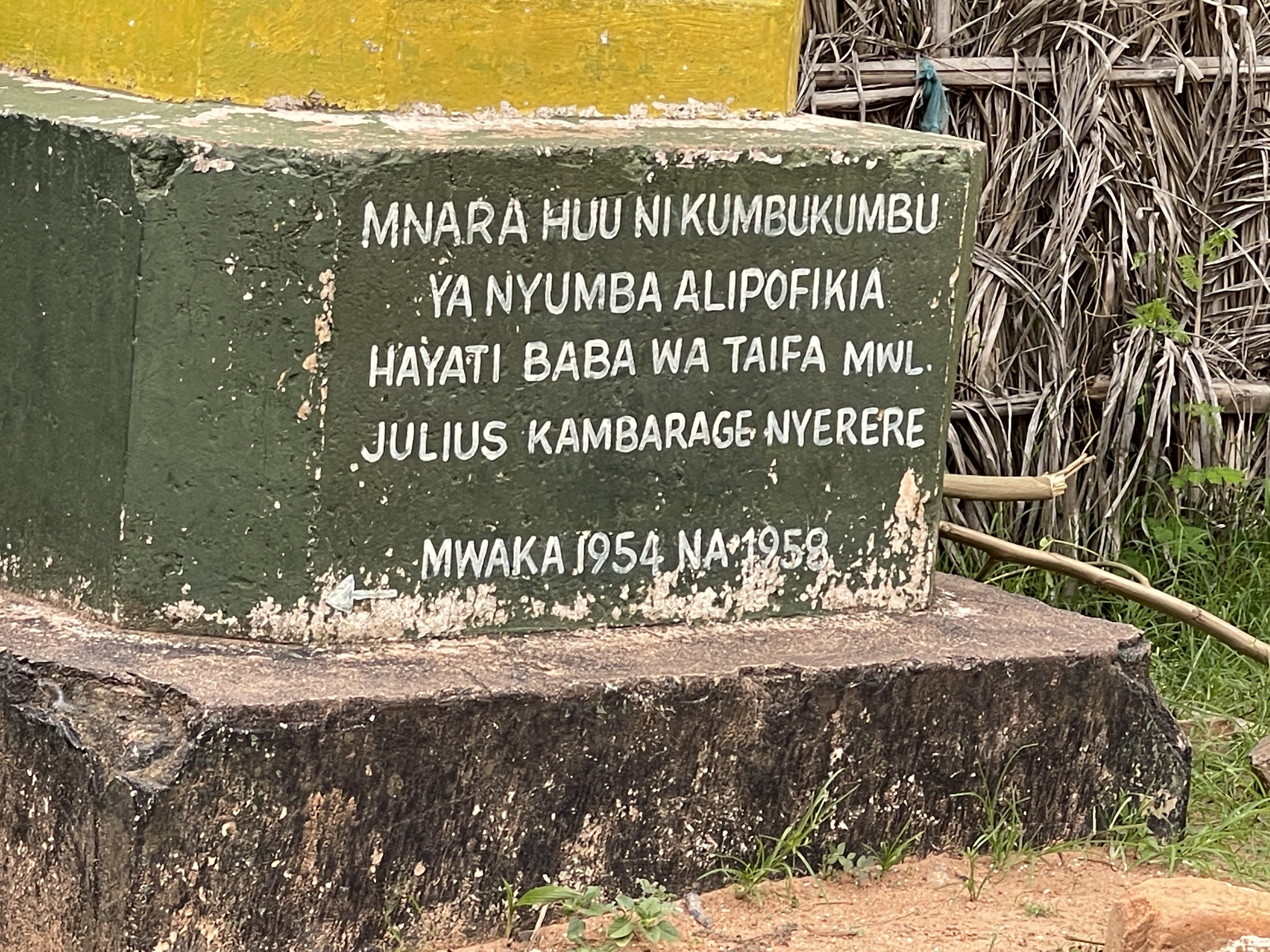
Nyerere House Plank in Kitongoni Ward, Kigoma-Ujiji

Kitongoni is an administrative ward in Kigoma-Ujiji District of Kigoma Region in Tanzania. The ward covers an area of 1.2 km^{2} (0.46 sq mi), and has an average elevation of 773 m (2,536 ft). In 2016 the Tanzania National Bureau of Statistics report that there were 7,675 people in the ward, up from 6,973 in 2012.

== Villages / neighborhoods ==
The ward has 5 neighborhoods.

- Kabondo
- Kawawa
- Mnazi Mmoja
- Rutale
- Wafipa
