= Mwanga Kusini =

Ward in Kigoma-Ujiji District, Kigoma Region

Mwanga Kusini Kata ya Mwanga Kusini (Swahili)
- Ward
- Kata ya Mwanga Kusini, Wilaya ya Kigoma-Ujiji
- Location within Tanzania
- Country: Tanzania
- Region: Kigoma Region
- District: Kigoma-Ujiji District

Area
  - Total: 3.5 km^{2} (1.4 sq mi)
- Elevation: 787 m (2,582 ft)

Population (2016)
  - Total: 17,976
  - Density: 5,100/km^{2} (13,000/sq mi)
- Tanzanian Postal Code: 47104

Mwanga Kusini is an administrative ward in Kigoma-Ujiji District of Kigoma Region in Tanzania. The ward covers an area of 3.5 km^{2} (1.4 sq mi), and has an average elevation of 787 m (2,582 ft). In 2016 the Tanzania National Bureau of Statistics report there were 17,976 people in the ward, from 16,331 in 2012.

== Villages / neighborhoods ==
The ward has 10 neighborhoods and villages.

- Game
- Kilima Hewa
- Lumumba
- Msikiti
- Muhogwe
- Rusimbi
- Shaurimoyo
- Simu
- Vamia
- Yusufu
