= Kigoma Ward =

Ward in Kigoma-Ujiji District, Kigoma Region

Kigoma Kata ya Kigoma (Swahili)
- Ward
- Kata ya Kigoma, Wilaya ya Kigoma-Ujiji
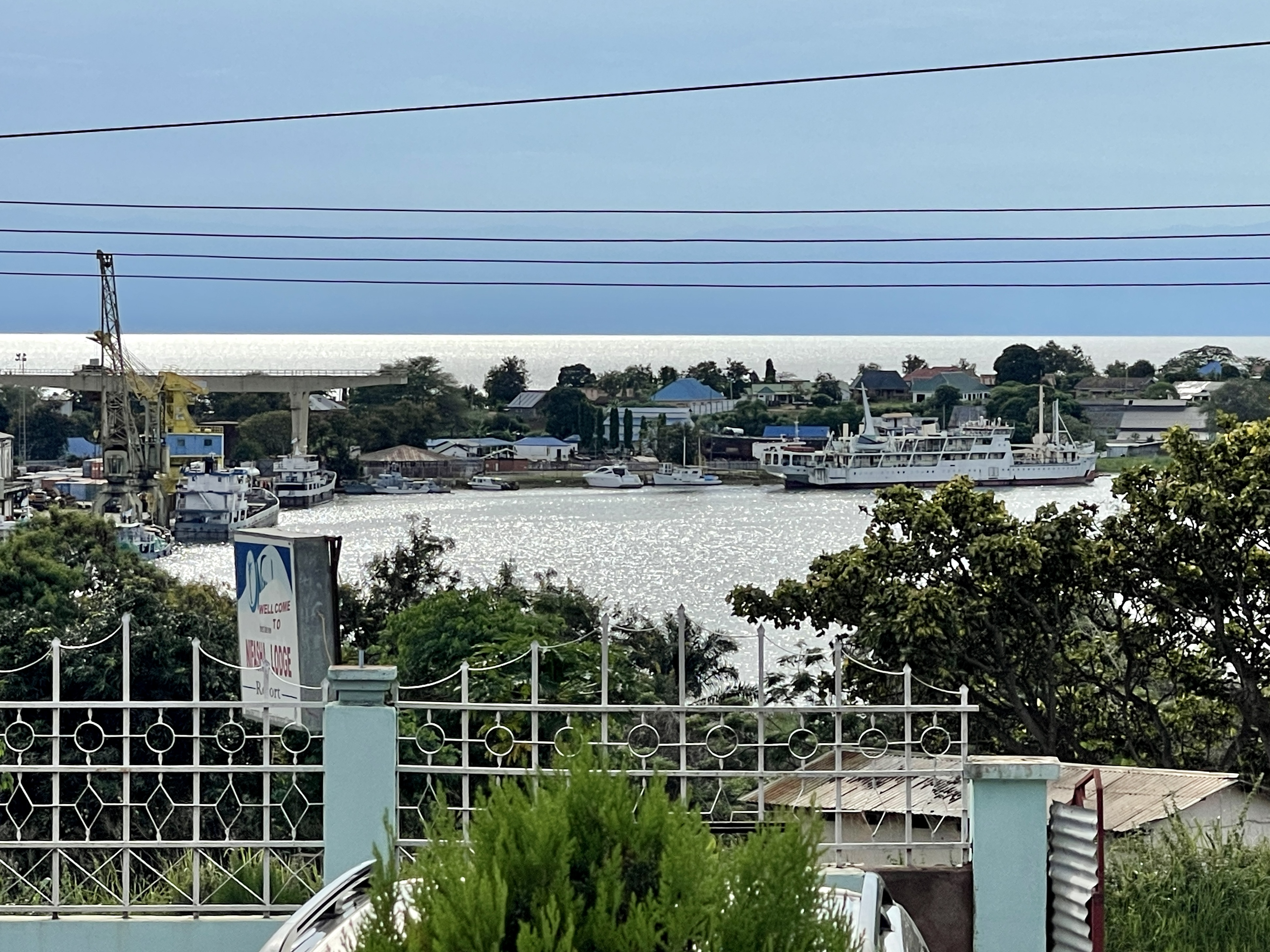
- Kigoma Harbor, Kigoma Ward, Kigoma-Ujiji District

- Location within Tanzania
- Country: Tanzania
- Region: Kigoma Region
- District: Kigoma-Ujiji District

Area
  - Total: 4 km^{2} (1.5 sq mi)
- Elevation: 789 m (2,589 ft)

Population (2016)
  - Total: 7,604
  - Density: 1,900/km^{2} (4,900/sq mi)
- Tanzanian Postal Code: 47101

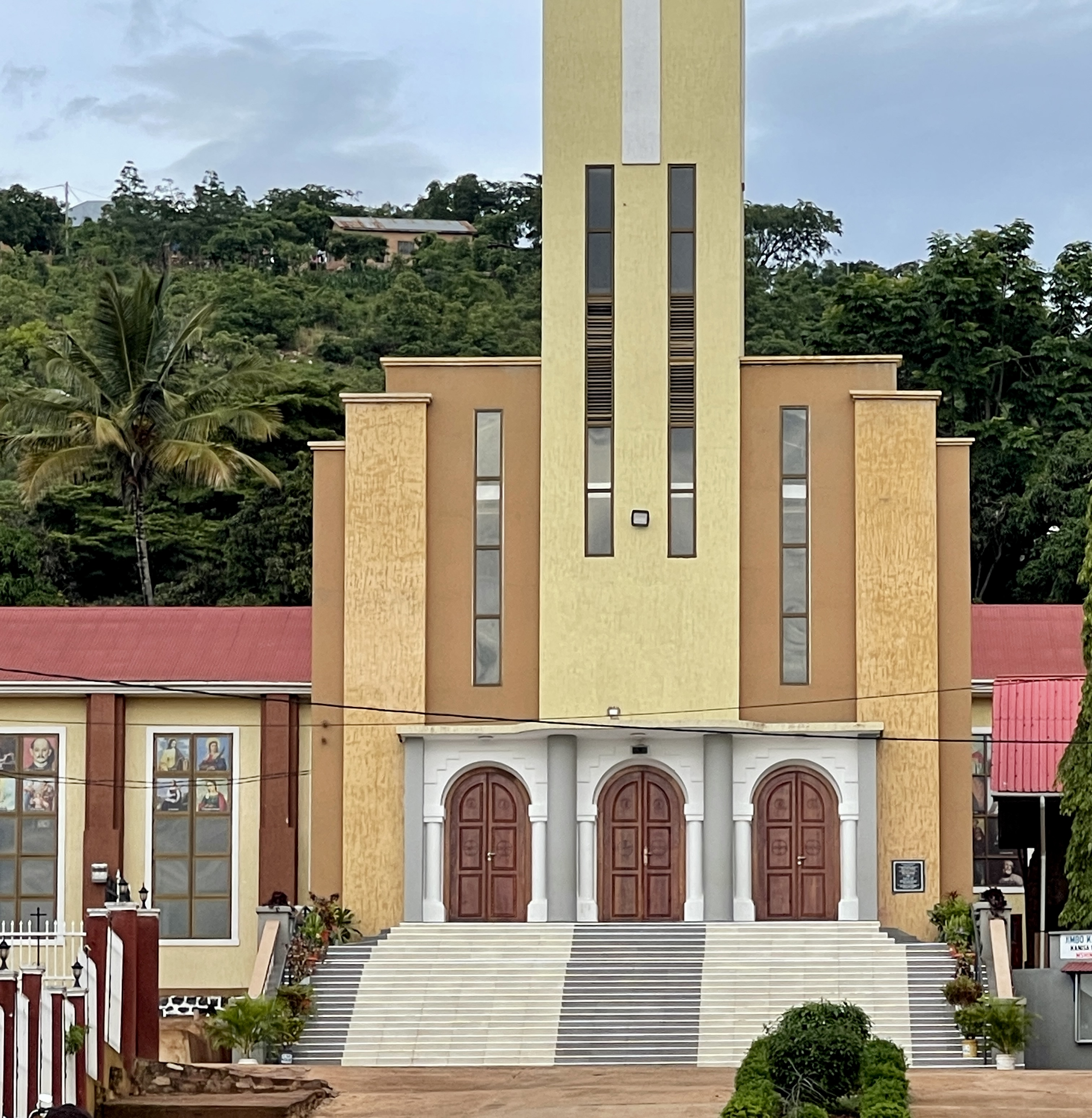
Church in Kigoma Ward, Kigoma-Ujiji District

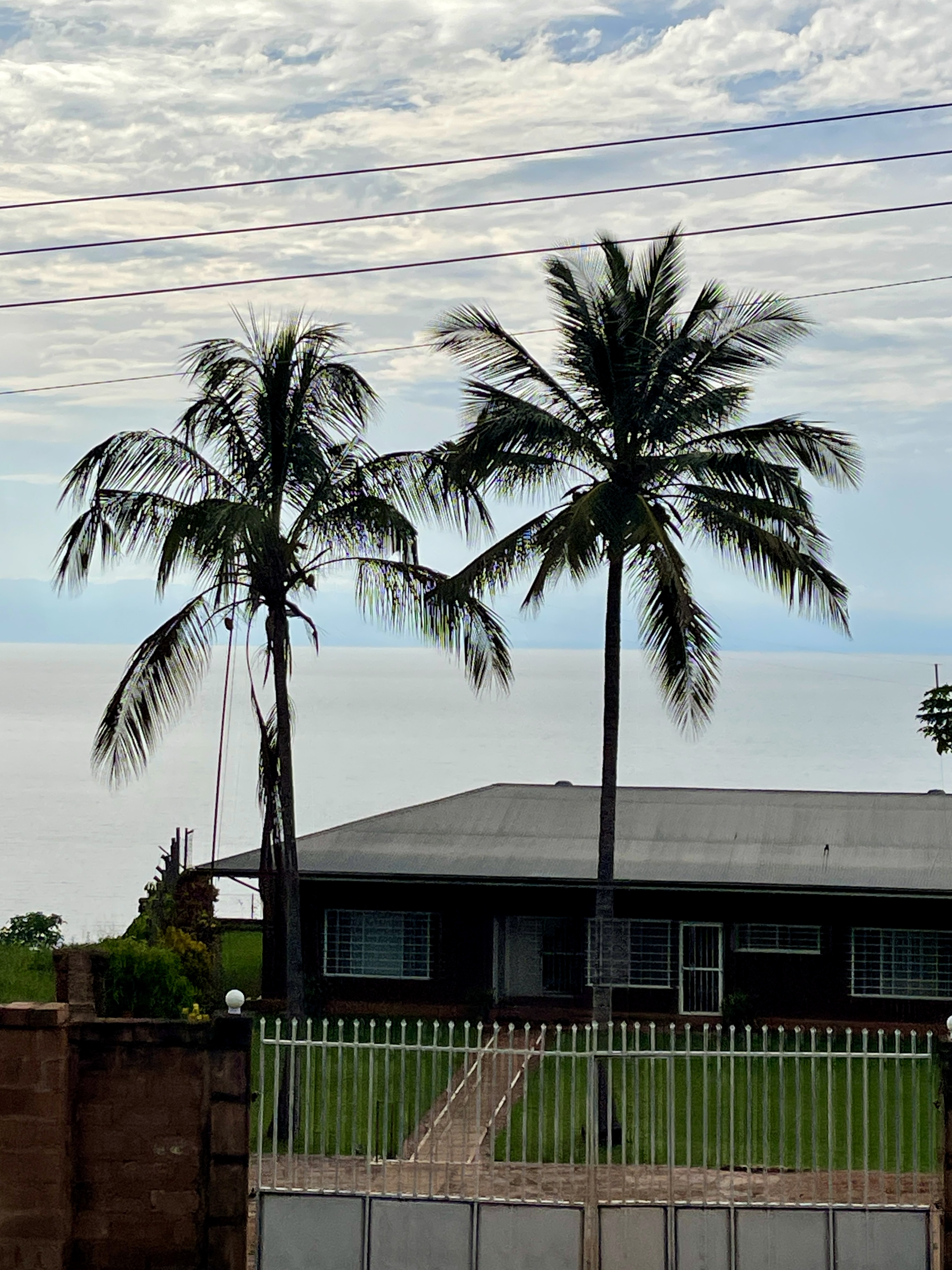
Sunrise and Coconuts in Kigoma Ward, Kigoma-Ujiji District

Kigoma is an administrative ward in Kigoma-Ujiji District of Kigoma Region in Tanzania. The ward covers an area of 4 km^{2} (1.5 sq mi), and has an average elevation of 789 m (2,589 ft). In 2016 the Tanzania National Bureau of Statistics report there were 7,604 people in the ward, from 6,908 in 2012.

== Villages / neighborhoods ==
The ward has 4 neighborhoods.

- Katonga
- Lumumba
- Mji Mwema
- Shede
