= Kibirizi =

Ward in Kigoma-Ujiji District, Kigoma Region

Kibirizi Kata ya Kibirizi (Swahili)
- Ward
- Kata ya Kibirizi, Wilaya ya Kigoma-Ujiji
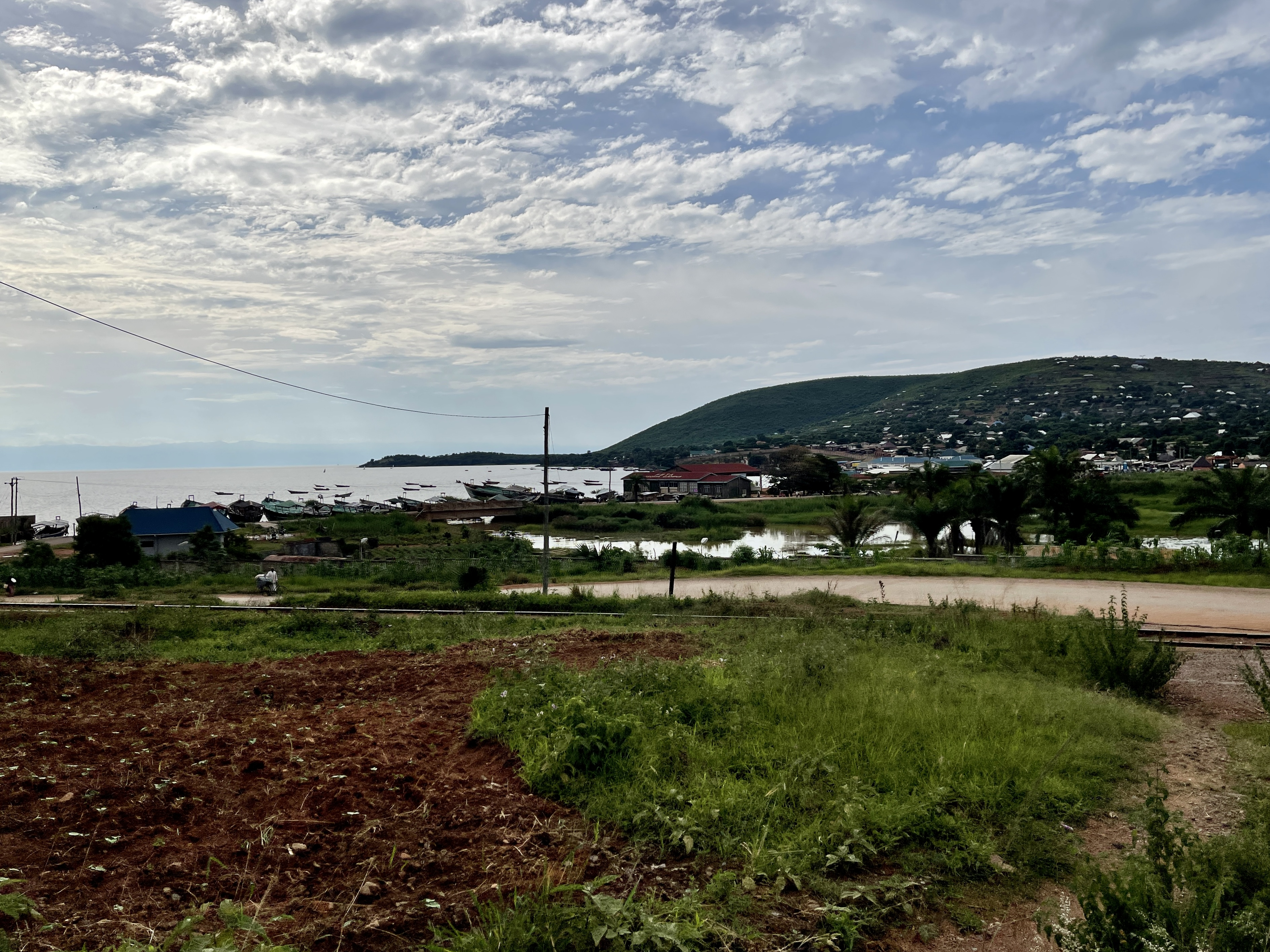
- Railway crossing in Kibirizi Ward

- Location within Tanzania
- Country: Tanzania
- Region: Kigoma Region
- District: Kigoma-Ujiji District

Area
  - Total: 12.5 km^{2} (4.8 sq mi)
- Elevation: 826 m (2,710 ft)

Population (2016)
  - Total: 27,675
  - Density: 2,210/km^{2} (5,730/sq mi)
- Tanzanian Postal Code: 47116

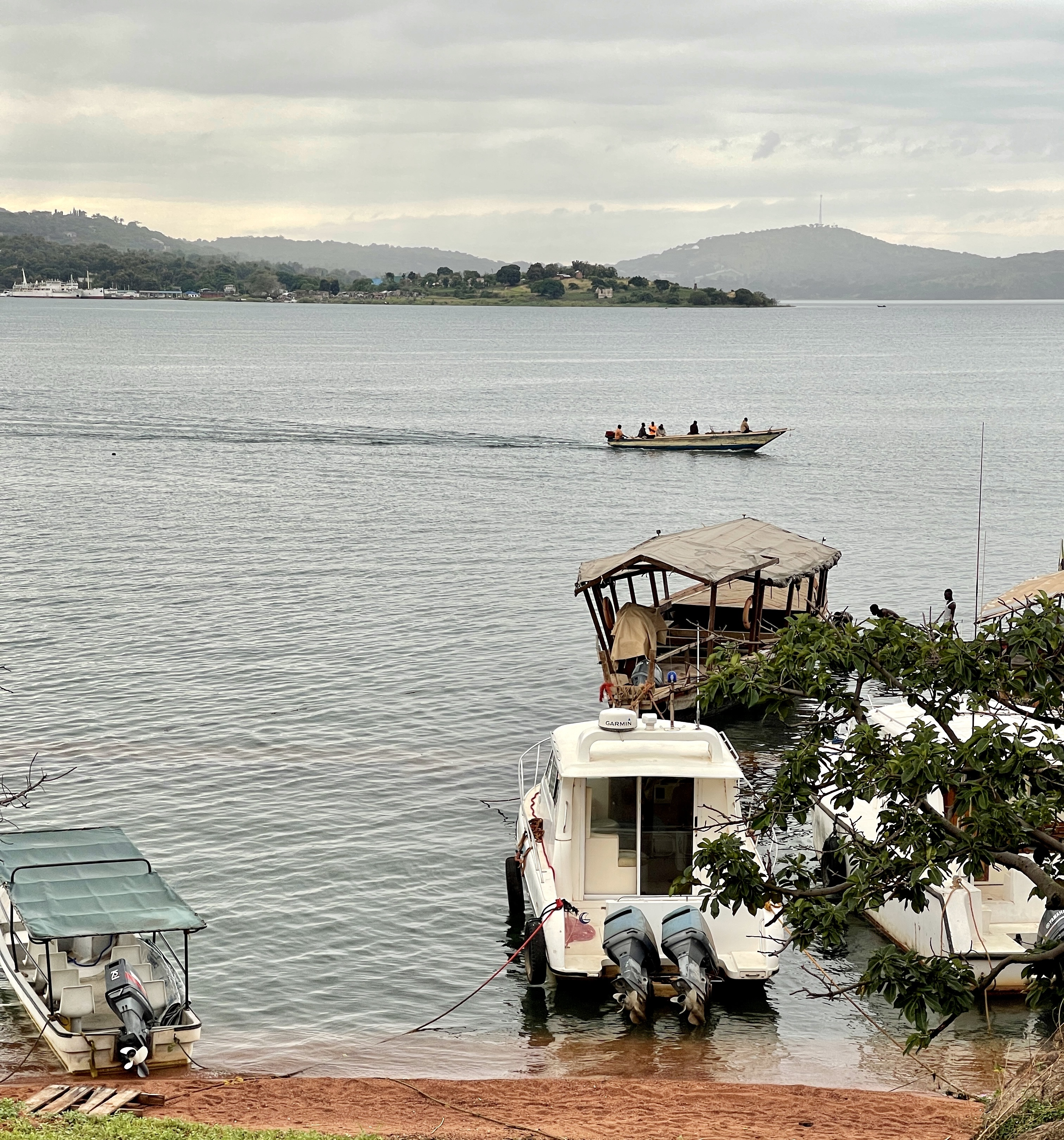
Tourism boats in Kibirizi Ward, Kigoma-Ujiji

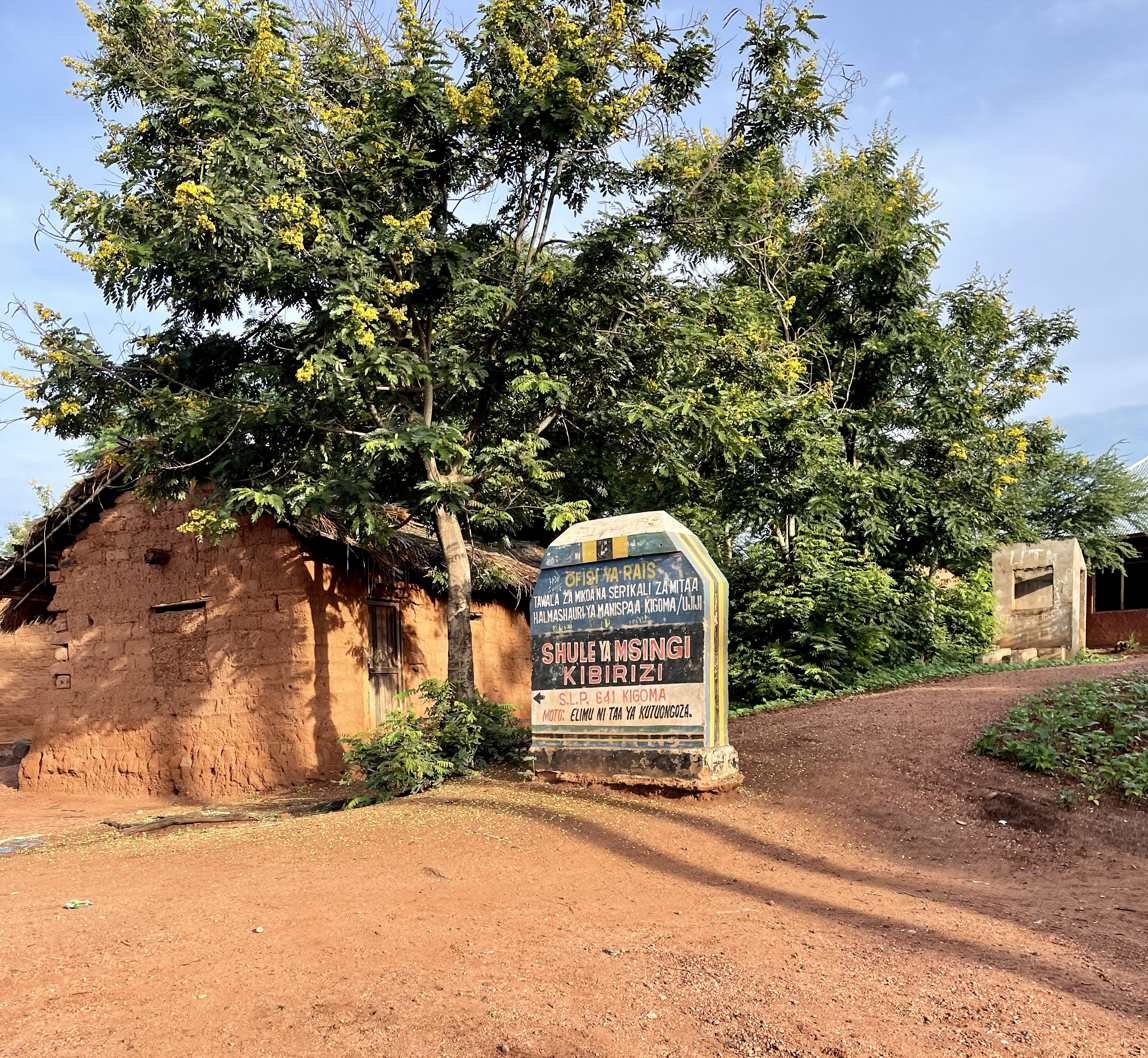
Kibirizi Primary School n Kibirizi Ward, Kigoma-Ujiji

Kibirizi is an administrative ward in Kigoma-Ujiji District of Kigoma Region in Tanzania. The ward covers an area of 12.5 km^{2} (4.8 sq mi), and has an average elevation of 826 m (2,710 ft). In 2016 the Tanzania National Bureau of Statistics report there were 27,675 people in the ward, from 25,143 in 2012.

== Villages / neighborhoods ==
The ward has 11 neighborhoods.

- Buronge
- Bushabani
- Butunga
- Kahabwa
- Katandala
- Kibirizi B
- Kibirizii A
- Kichwele
- Mgombewa
- Mtolele
- Rasini
