= Mwanga Kaskazini =

Ward in Kigoma-Ujiji District, Kigoma Region

Mwanga Kaskazini Kata ya Mwanga Kaskazini (Swahili)
- Ward
- Kata ya Mwanga Kaskazini, Wilaya ya Kigoma-Ujiji
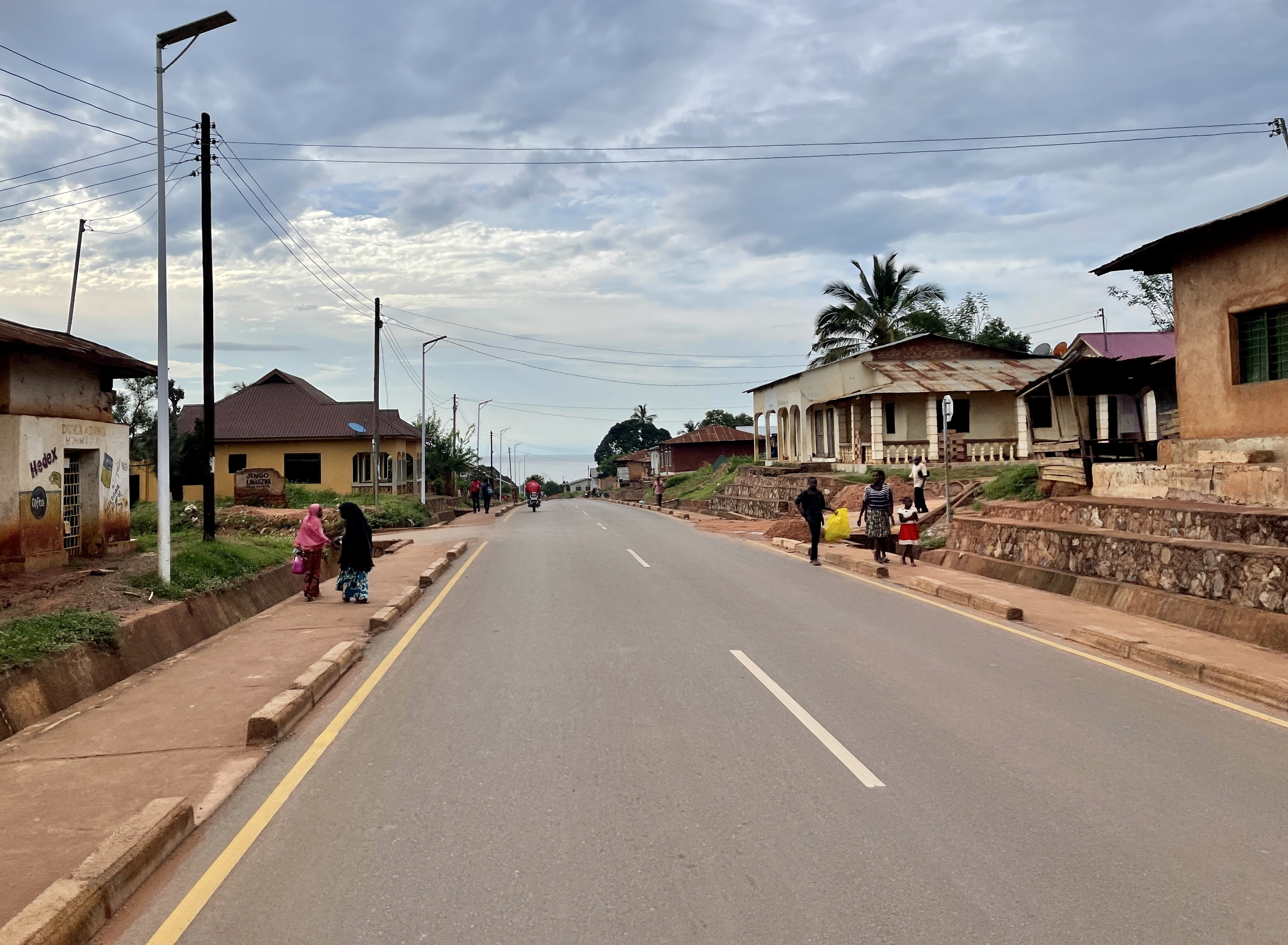
- Street Scene Mwanga Kaskazini Ward, Kigoma-Ujiji

- Location within Tanzania
- Country: Tanzania
- Region: Kigoma Region
- District: Kigoma-Ujiji District

Area
  - Total: 3.7 km^{2} (1.4 sq mi)
- Elevation: 803 m (2,635 ft)

Population (2016)
  - Total: 26,620
  - Density: 7,200/km^{2} (19,000/sq mi)
- Tanzanian Postal Code: 47103

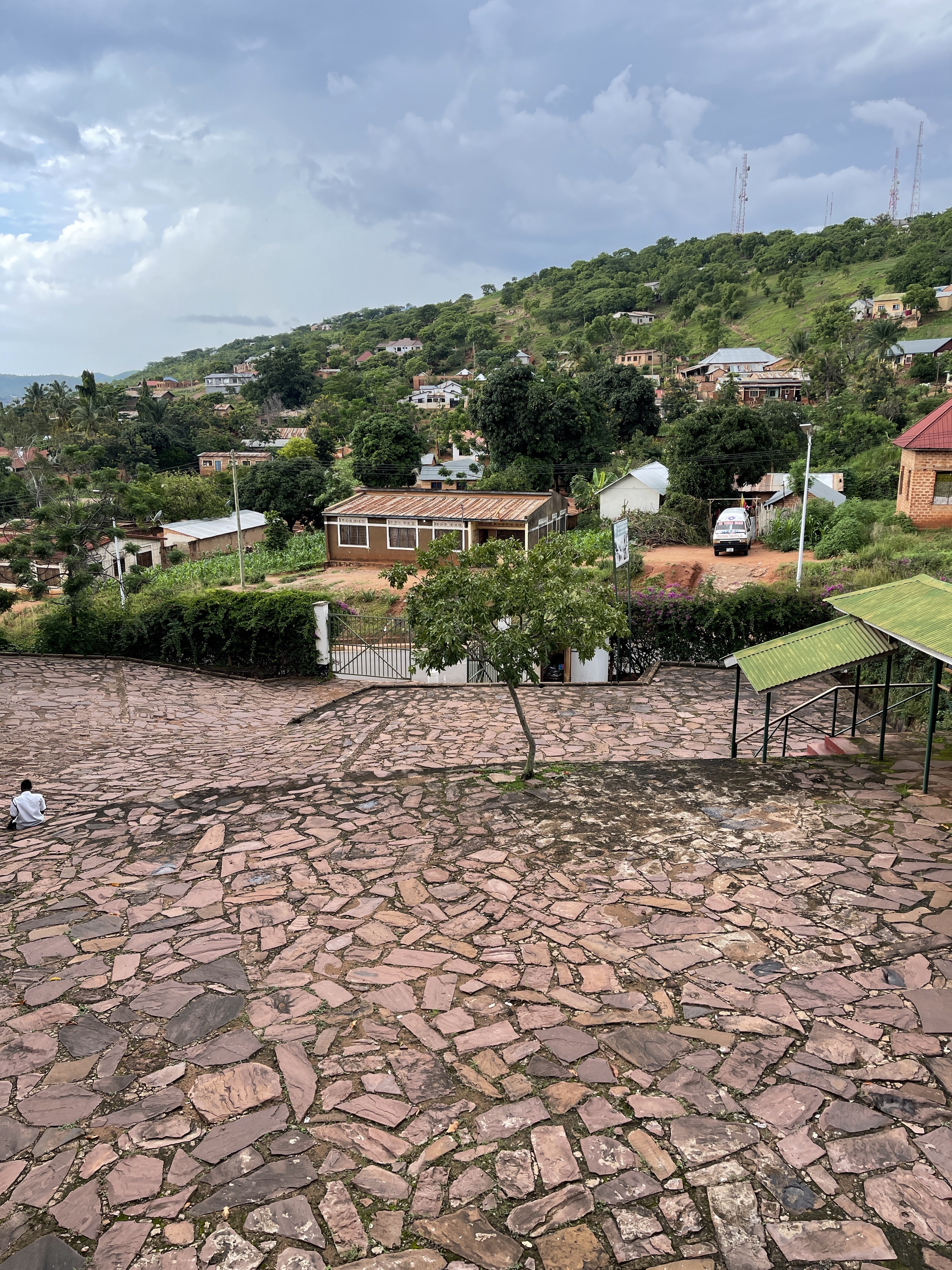
Landscape in Mwanga Kaskazini Ward, Kigoma-Ujiji

Mwanga Kaskazini is an administrative ward in Kigoma-Ujiji District of Kigoma Region in Tanzania. The ward covers an area of 3.7 km^{2} (1.4 sq mi), and has an average elevation of 803 m (2,635 ft). In 2016 the Tanzania National Bureau of Statistics report there were 26,620 people in the ward, from 24,184 in 2012.

== Villages / neighborhoods ==
The ward has 3 neighborhoods.

- Kisangani
- Mlole
- Ujenzi
