= Machinjioni =

Ward in Kigoma-Ujiji District, Kigoma Region

Machinjioni Kata ya Machinjioni (Swahili)
- Ward
- Kata ya Machinjioni, Wilaya ya Kigoma-Ujiji
- Location within Tanzania
- Country: Tanzania
- Region: Kigoma Region
- District: Kigoma-Ujiji District

Area
  - Total: 1.1 km^{2} (0.42 sq mi)
- Elevation: 839 m (2,753 ft)

Population (2016)
  - Total: 3,814
  - Density: 3,500/km^{2} (9,000/sq mi)
- Tanzanian Postal Code: 47109

Machinjioni is an administrative ward in Kigoma-Ujiji District of Kigoma Region in Tanzania. The ward covers an area of 1.1 km^{2} (0.42 sq mi), and has an average elevation of 839 m (2,753 ft). In 2016 the Tanzania National Bureau of Statistics report there were 3,814 people in the ward, from 3,465 in 2012.

== Villages / neighborhoods ==
The ward has 4 neighborhoods.

- Kiruga
- Kitenge
- Ukumbi
- Wakuha
