= Bangwe, Kigoma =

Ward in Kigoma-Ujiji District, Mtwara Region

Bangwe Kata ya Bangwe (Swahili)
- Ward
- Kata ya Bangwe, Wilaya ya Kigoma-Ujiji
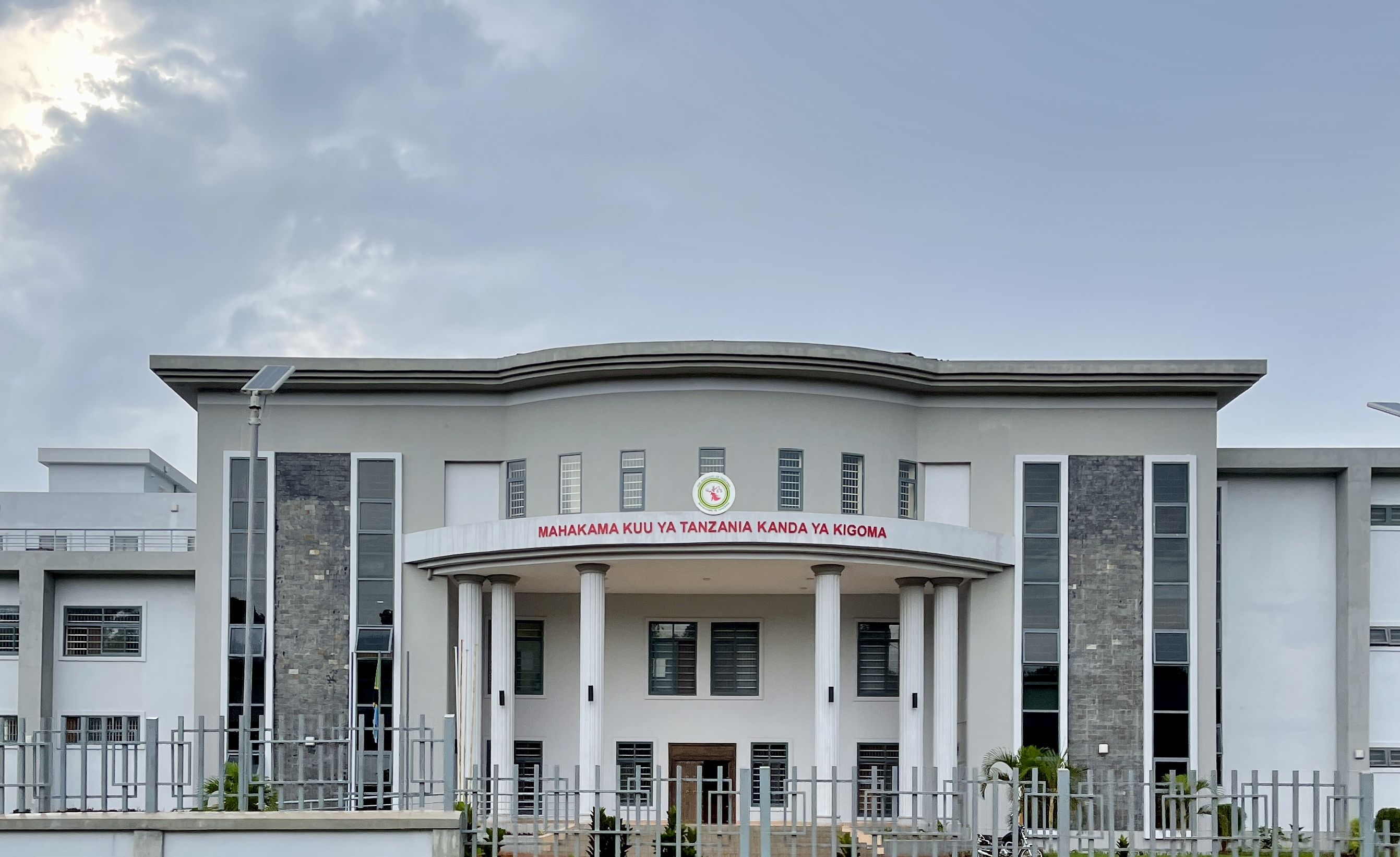
- Kigoma High Court, Bangwe Ward, Kigoma- Ujiji District

- Location within Tanzania
- Country: Tanzania
- Region: Kigoma Region
- District: Kigoma-Ujiji District

Area
  - Total: 10.2 km^{2} (3.9 sq mi)
- Elevation: 770 m (2,530 ft)

Population (2016)
  - Total: 17,009
  - Density: 1,670/km^{2} (4,320/sq mi)
- Time zone: UTC+3
- Tanzanian Postal Code: 47102

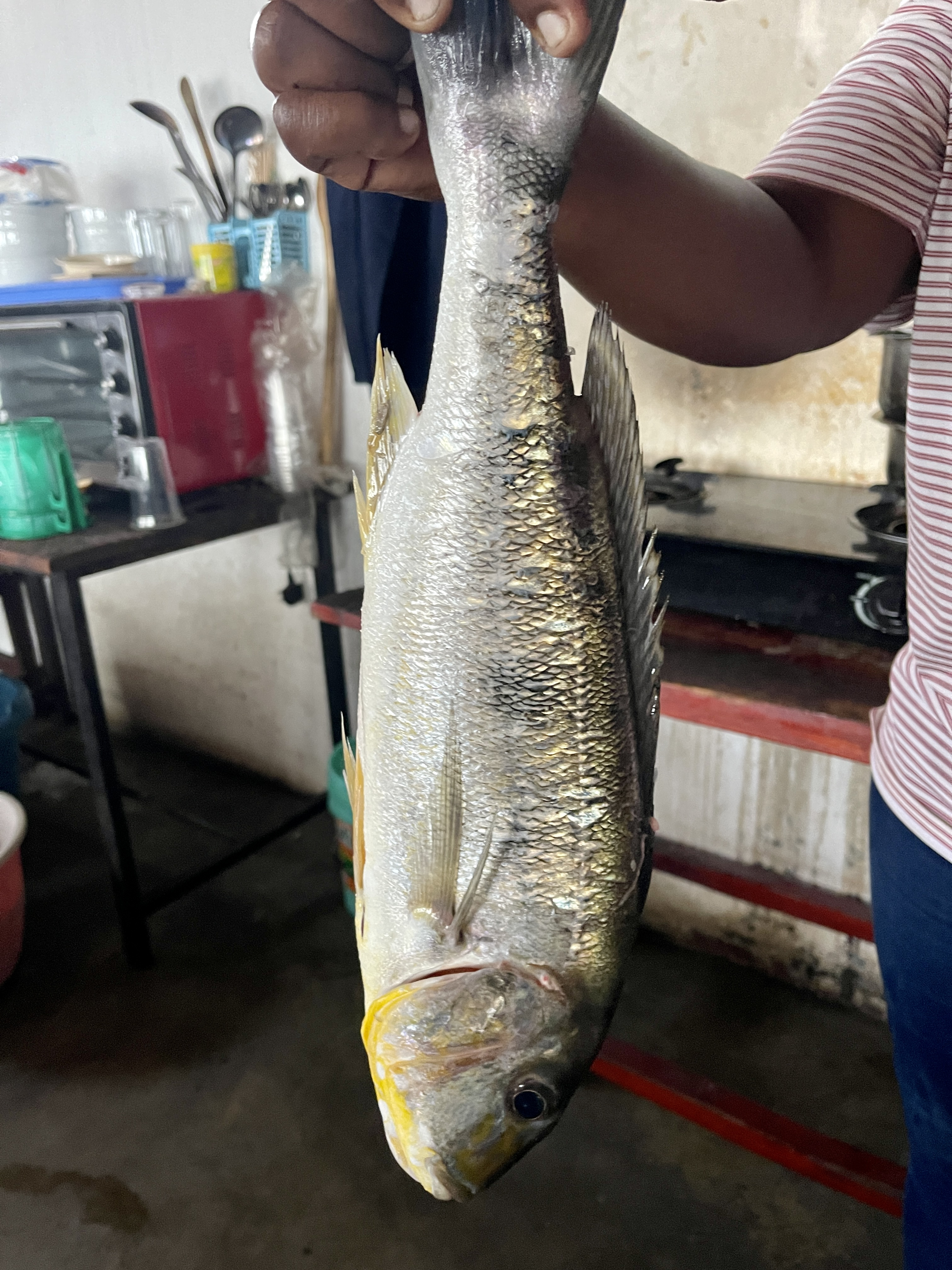
Lake Tanganyika fish in Bangwe Ward, Kigoma

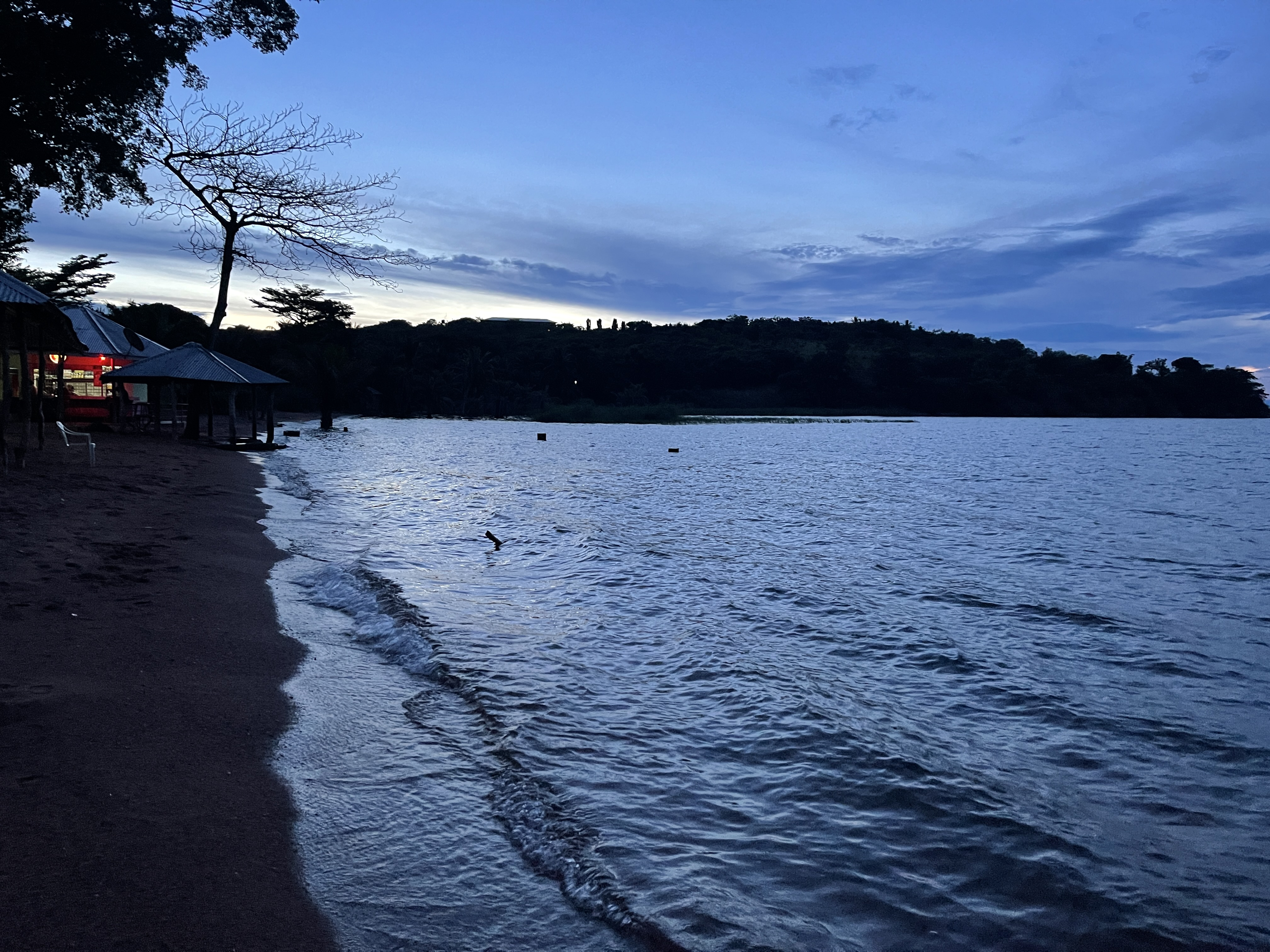
Beach at night Bangwe Ward, Kigoma-Ujiji

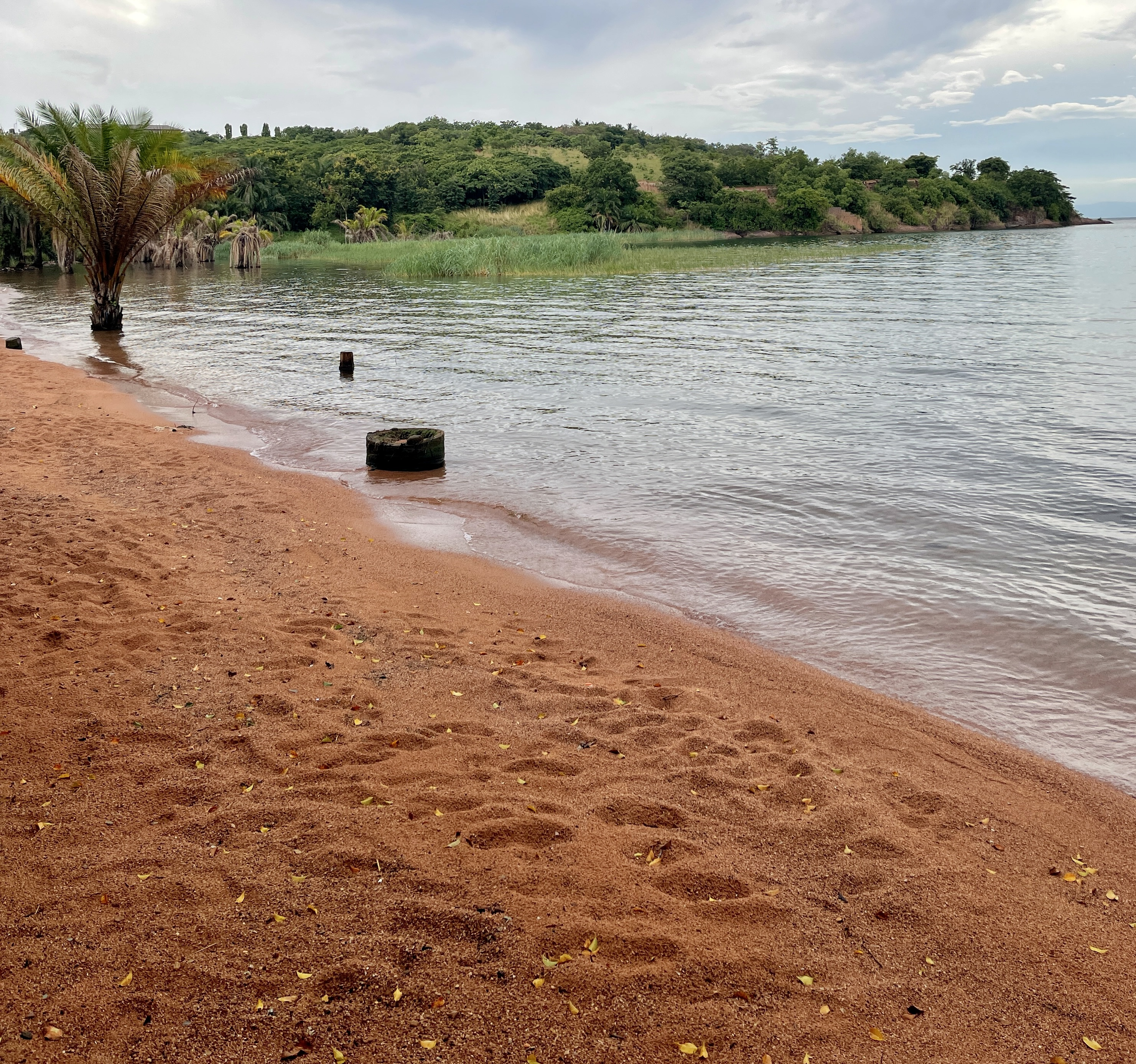
Beach at day Bangwe Ward, Kigoma-Ujiji

Bangwe is an administrative ward in Kigoma-Ujiji District of Kigoma Region in Tanzania. The ward covers an area of 10.2 km^{2} (3.9 sq mi), and has an average elevation of 770 m (2,530 ft). The Tanzania National Bureau of Statistics reported 17,009 people in the ward in 2016, up from 15,453 in 2012.

== Villages / neighborhoods ==
The ward has 8 villages and neighborhoods.

- Buteko
- Kamala Kati
- Kamala Kisiwani
- Kamala Magharibi
- Kamala Mashariki A
- Kamala Mashariki B
- Katonga Magharibi
- Katonga Mashariki
