= Kasimbu =

Ward in Kigoma-Ujiji District, Kigoma Region

Kasimbu Kata ya Kasimbu (Swahili)
- Ward
- Kata ya Kasimbu, Wilaya ya Kigoma-Ujiji
- Location within Tanzania
- Country: Tanzania
- Region: Kigoma Region
- District: Kigoma-Ujiji District

Area
  - Total: 1.9 km^{2} (0.73 sq mi)
- Elevation: 783 m (2,569 ft)

Population (2016)
  - Total: 5,405
  - Density: 2,800/km^{2} (7,400/sq mi)
- Tanzanian Postal Code: 47112

Kasimbu is an administrative ward in Kigoma-Ujiji District of Kigoma Region in Tanzania. The ward covers an area of 1.9 km^{2} (0.73 sq mi), and has an average elevation of 783 m (2,569 ft). In 2016 the Tanzania National Bureau of Statistics report there were 5,405 people in the ward, from 4,910 in 2012.

== Villages / neighborhoods ==
The ward has 4 neighborhoods.

- Busomero
- Lumumba
- Mashine
- Ndahiriyo
