= Rubuga =

Ward in Kigoma-Ujiji District, Kigoma Region

Rubuga Kata ya Rubuga (Swahili)
- Ward
- Kata ya Rubuga, Wilaya ya Kigoma-Ujiji
- Location within Tanzania
- Country: Tanzania
- Region: Kigoma Region
- District: Kigoma-Ujiji District

Area
  - Total: 1.2 km^{2} (0.46 sq mi)
- Elevation: 784 m (2,572 ft)

Population (2016)
  - Total: 2,899
  - Density: 2,400/km^{2} (6,300/sq mi)
- Tanzanian Postal Code: 47111

Rubuga is an administrative ward in Kigoma-Ujiji District of Kigoma Region in Tanzania. The ward covers an area of 1.2 km^{2} (0.46 sq mi), and has an average elevation of 784 m (2,572 ft). In 2016 the Tanzania National Bureau of Statistics report there were 2,899 people in the ward, from 2,634 in 2012.

== Villages / neighborhoods ==
The ward has 4 neighborhoods.

- Kipande
- Ndarabu
- Rubuga
- Wahombo
