= Gungu, Kigoma-Ujiji =

Ward in Kigoma-Ujiji District, Kigoma Region

Gungu Kata ya Gungu (Swahili)
- Ward
- Kata ya Gungu, Wilaya ya Kigoma-Ujiji
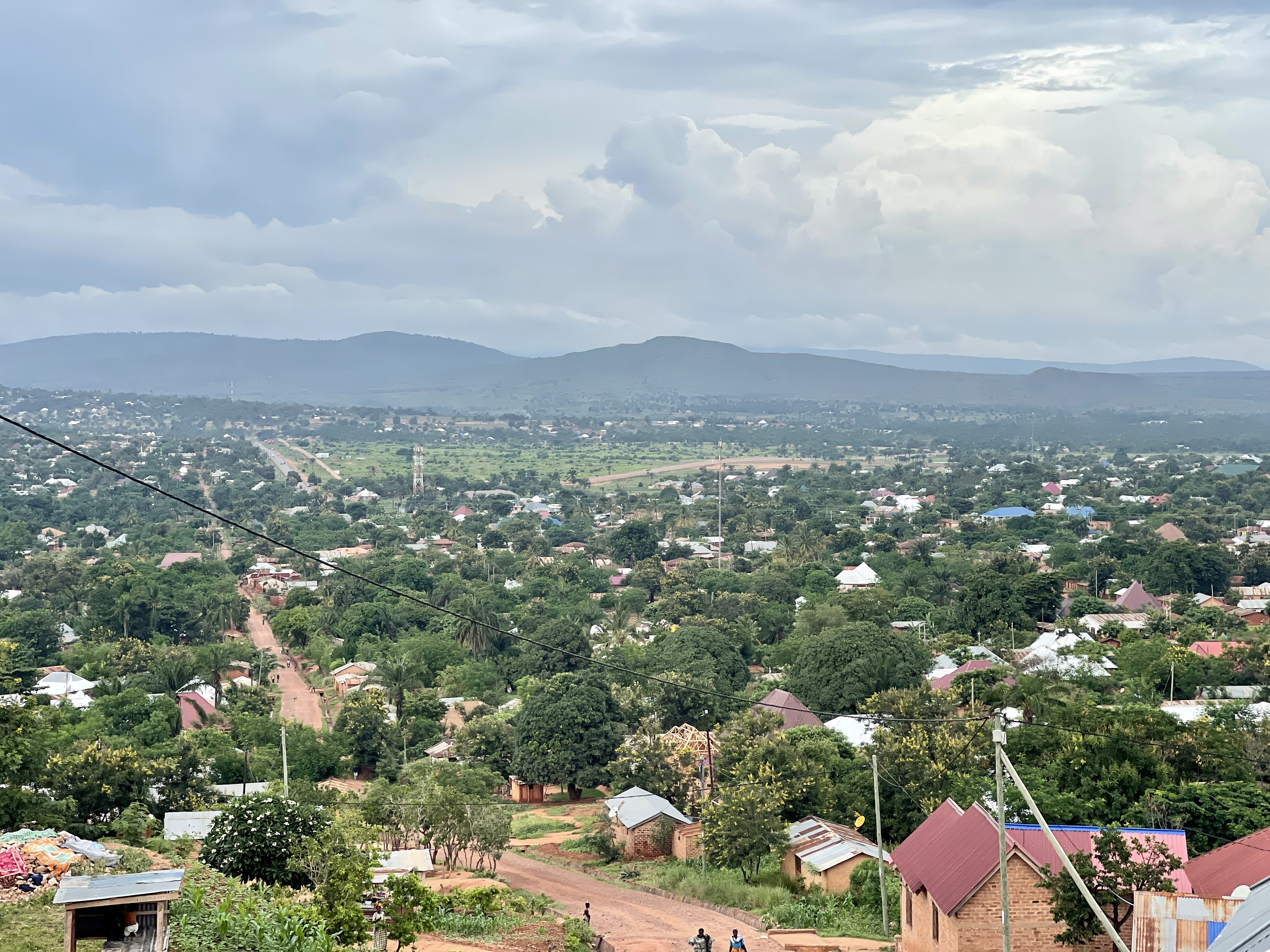
- East view in Gungu Ward, Kigoma-Ujiji

- Location within Tanzania
- Country: Tanzania
- Region: Kigoma Region
- District: Kigoma-Ujiji District

Area
  - Total: 4.7 km^{2} (1.8 sq mi)
- Elevation: 818 m (2,684 ft)

Population (2016)
  - Total: 27,764
  - Density: 5,900/km^{2} (15,000/sq mi)
- Time zone: UTC+3 (EAT)
- Tanzanian Postal Code: 47105

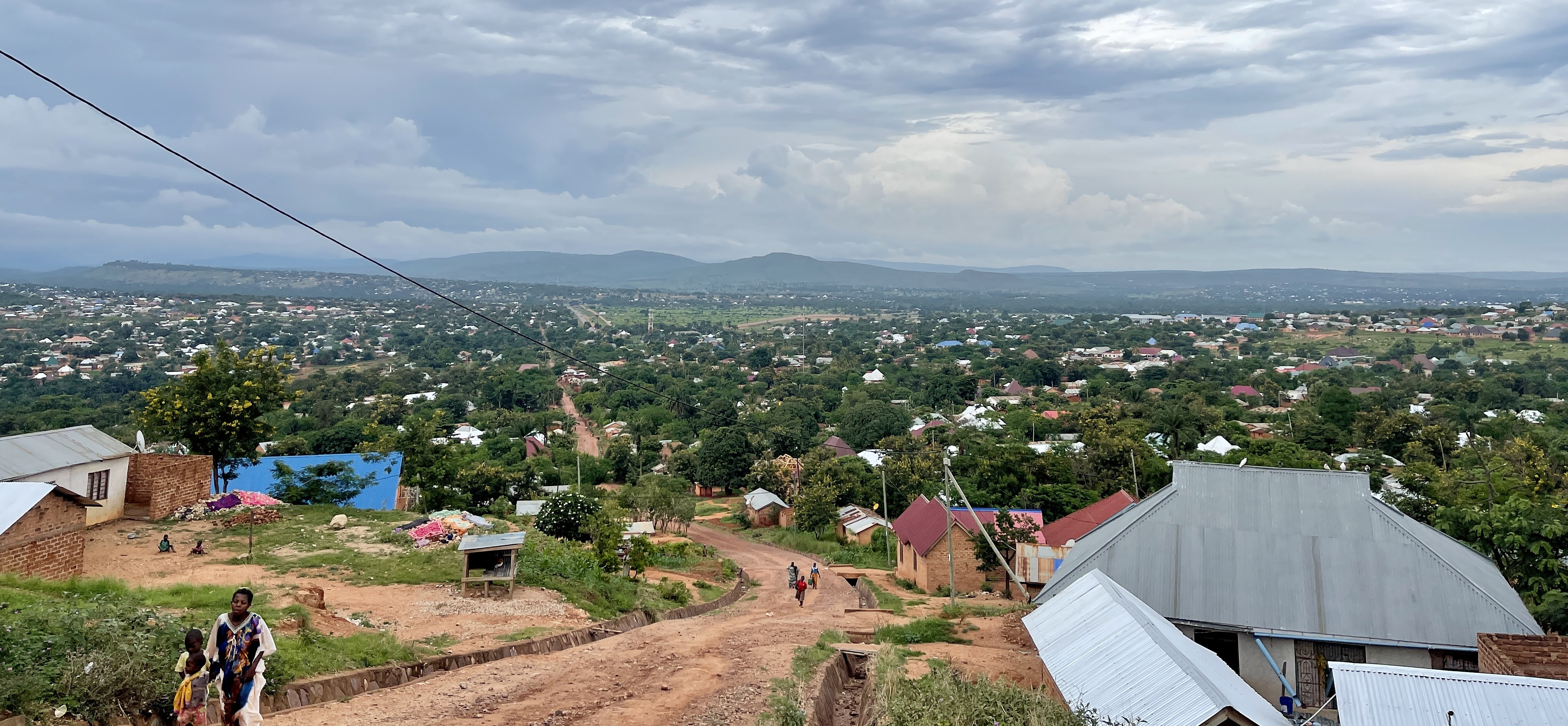
Scene in Gungu Ward, Kigoma-Ujiji

Gungu is an administrative ward in Kigoma-Ujiji District of Kigoma Region in Tanzania. The ward covers an area of 10.2 km^{2} (3.9 sq mi), and has an average elevation of 818 m (2,684 ft). In 2016 the Tanzania National Bureau of Statistics report there were 27,764 people in the ward, from 25,224 in 2012.

== Villages / neighborhoods ==
The ward has 7 villages and neighborhoods.

- Buronge
- Bushabani
- Butunga
- Gezaulole
- Kikungu
- Masanga
- Mwenge
- Mlole
- Nyakageni
- Sango
- Barabara ya Senga
- Mzalendo
- Barabara ya Rusimbi
- Msulula
- Kichwere
- Ubembeni
- Ufipani
- Soko la zamani
- Zulu
