= Buhanda =

Ward in Kigoma-Ujiji District, Kigoma Region

Buhanda Kata ya Buhanda (Swahili)
- Ward
- Kata ya Buhanda, Wilaya ya Kigoma-Ujiji
- Location within Tanzania
- Country: Tanzania
- Region: Kigoma Region
- District: Kigoma-Ujiji District

Area
  - Total: 5.5 km^{2} (2.1 sq mi)
- Elevation: 864 m (2,835 ft)

Population (2016)
  - Total: 8,397
  - Density: 1,500/km^{2} (4,000/sq mi)
- Time zone: UTC+3 (EAT)
- Tanzanian Postal Code: 47106

Buhanda is an administrative ward in Kigoma-Ujiji District of Kigoma Region in Tanzania. The ward covers an area of 5.5 km^{2} (2.1 sq mi), and has an average elevation of 864 m (2,835 ft). In 2016 the Tanzania National Bureau of Statistics reported there were 8,397 people in the ward, from 7,629 in 2012.

== Villages / neighborhoods ==
The ward has 4 villages and neighborhoods.

- Masanga
- Mgeo
- Msufini
- Mungonya
