= Kagera, Kigoma-Ujiji =

Ward in Kigoma-Ujiji District, Kigoma Region

Kagera Kata ya Kagera (Swahili)
- Ward
- Kata ya Kagera, Wilaya ya Kigoma-Ujiji
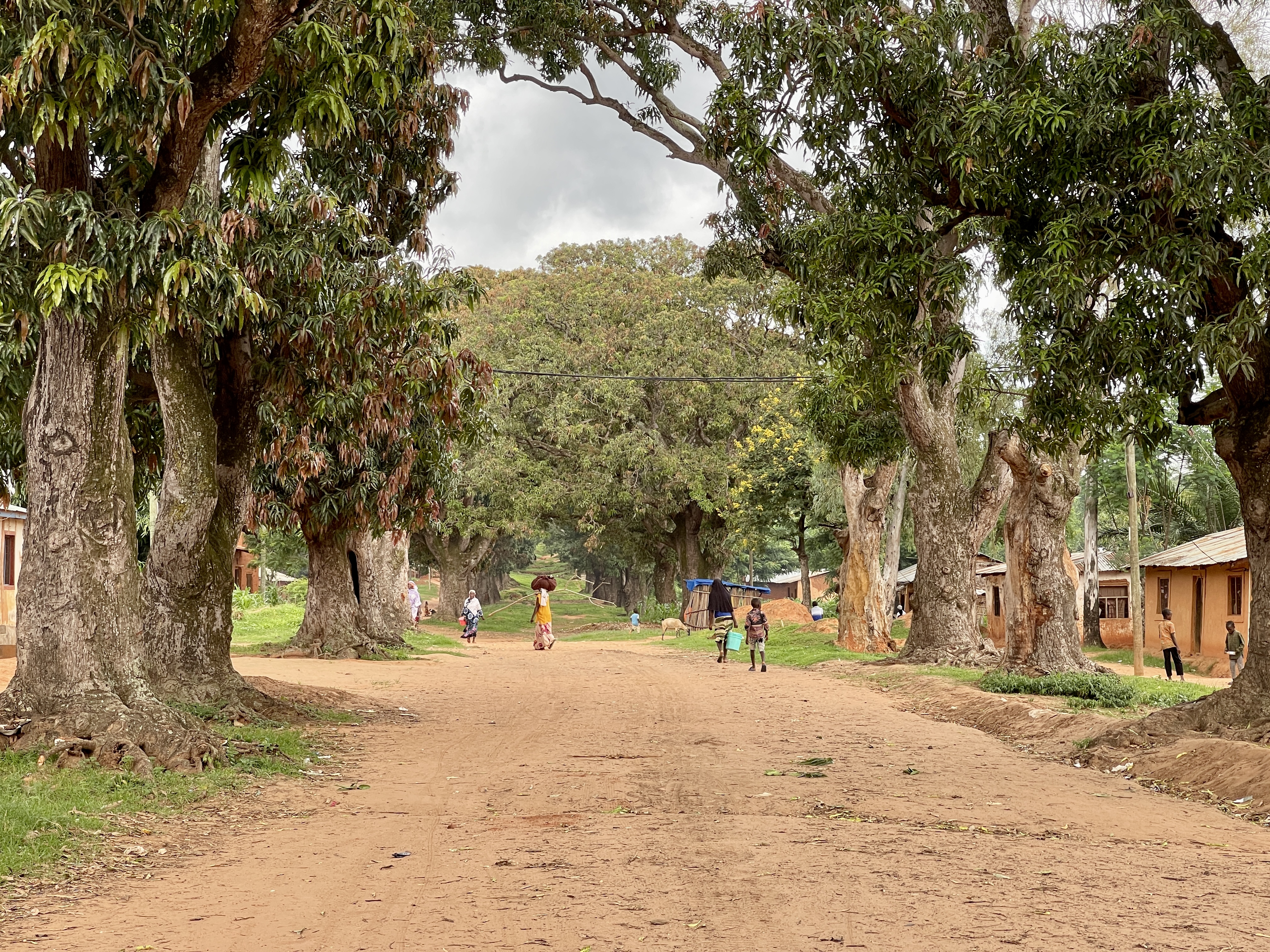
- Entry to Mango Row, Kagera Ward, Kigoma-Ujiji

- Location within Tanzania
- Country: Tanzania
- Region: Kigoma Region
- District: Kigoma-Ujiji District

Area
  - Total: 24.3 km^{2} (9.4 sq mi)
- Elevation: 786 m (2,579 ft)

Population (2016)
  - Total: 9,950
  - Density: 409/km^{2} (1,060/sq mi)
- Tanzanian Postal Code: 47113

Kagera is an administrative ward in Kigoma-Ujiji District of Kigoma Region in Tanzania. The ward covers an area of 24.3 km^{2} (9.4 sq mi), and has an average elevation of 786 m (2,579 ft). In 2016 the Tanzania National Bureau of Statistics report there were 9,950 people in the ward, from 9,040 in 2012.

== Villages / neighborhoods ==
The ward has 4 villages and neighborhoods.

- Kanswa
- Kibwe
- Mkese
- Mgumile
