= Zitto Kabwe =

Tanzanian politician

Zitto 'Mwami Ruyagwa' Kabwe
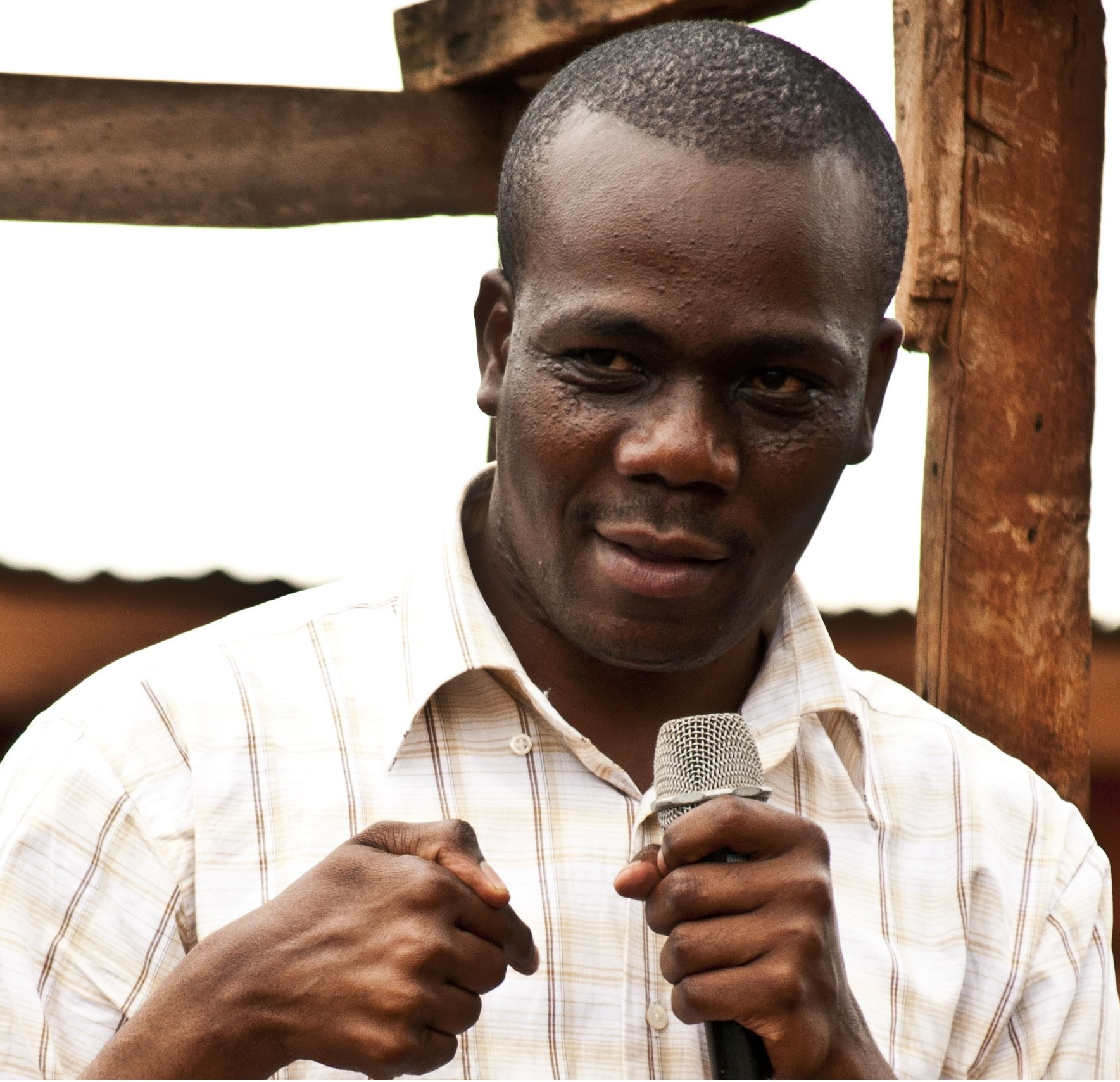

Leader of the Alliance for Change and Transparency Party
- In office March 2015 – March 2024
- Preceded by: Post established
- Succeeded by: Doeothy Manka Jonas Semu

Member of Parliament for Kigoma Urban/Kigoma Ujiji
- In office December 2005 – 20 March 2015(Kigoma North)

Personal details
- Born: 24 September 1976 (age 50) Mwandiga, Kigoma District, Tanzania
- Party: ACT Wazalendo (2015–); CHADEMA (1992–2015)
- Spouse: Anna Bwana
- Children: 4
- Education: University of Dar es Salaam; Bucerius Law School (MLB)
- Website: Office Holder Website

Zitto Zuberi Ruyagwa Kabwe (born 24 September 1976), popularly known as Zitto Kabwe, is a Tanzanian politician and party leader of ACT-Wazalendo.

He was a member of the opposition party, Chadema, from 1992 until his expulsion in March 2015. He served as a two term Member of Parliament for the Kigoma North constituency from 2005 to 2015.

He was also the Chairman of the parliamentary Public Accounts Committee (PAC) as well as the chair of the parliamentary standing committee where he oversaw more than 250 State-Owned Companies.

On 19 March 2015, he officially co-founded the Alliance for Change and Transparency and serves as its leader.

== Biography ==
=== Personal life ===
Zitto Kabwe was born in Mwandiga, Kigoma. His mother, Shida Salum Mohammed had 10 children, six girls and 4 boys. On June 1, 2014, Kabwe's mother died in Dar es Salaam after years of suffering from cervical cancer. At the time of her death, she was the chairperson for Chama cha Watu Wenye Ulemavu wa Viungo (CHAWATA). Now married to Ms. Anna Bwana, Kabwe is the father of a son named Wiza-Chachage and daughters Josina-UmmKulthum and Alaa-Angelika . His son is named after a public intellectual Prof. Chachage S. Chachage of the Universality of Dar es Salaam who was a close friend of Zitto. The daughters are named after a Mozambican Liberation Heroine Josina Machel and Zitto's much-loved auntie Mama Mhonga and who takes care of him as a mother after the death of Hajjat Shida Salum. Alaa is named after Alaa Salah, The Lady Liberty of the Sudanese Revolution, of 2019 and Zitto's mother-in-law Mrs. Angelika Bwana.

=== Education ===
Kabwe joined Kigoma Primary School in 1984 and sat for the CPEE in 1990. He went on to advance to Kigoma Secondary School in 1991 and was enrolled there until 1994. In 1994 he transferred to Kibohehe Secondary School where he sat for his CSEE in 1995 and went on to proceed to Galanos Secondary School for the 1996 academic year. In 1997 he joined Tosamaganga Secondary School and sat for his ACSEE in 1998.

In 1999 Kabwe joined the University of Dar es Salaam and earned a Bachelor of Arts degree in Economics in 2003. After working for 6 years, Zitto enrolled at Bucerius Law School located in Hamburg, Germany where he graduated with a Master of Law and Business degree (MLB) in 2010.

In 2011 Zitto Kabwe enrolled as a Ph.D. student at the Otto Beisheim School of Management in Vallendar, Germany.

=== Career ===
As the Chairman of the Public Accounts Committee, Mr. Kabwe campaigned for a strong conflict of interest code as a measure to fight corruption by public officeholders. He served as a bridge between political parties, parliamentarians and civil society organizations so that they could act together on matters of national interests.

=== The Mining Act of 2010 ===
Zitto Kabwe is strongly associated with the passage of the Mining Act, 2010, Cap 123. Kabwe was involved in cross-party negotiation and consultation with civil society as the law was drafted and considered. The act came in the wake of public concerns that Tanzania was getting meager royalties from the mining sector. The act places mining rights in the hands of Tanzanian nationals and required mining companies to list with the Dar es Salaam Stock Exchange. The mining act also restricted participation of non-Tanzanians in small scale mining, dealing in minerals and gemstone operations.
