= Simbo, Kigoma =

Ward in Kigoma District, Kigoma Region

Simbo Kata ya Simbo (Swahili)
- Ward
- Kata ya Simbo, Wilaya ya Kigoma
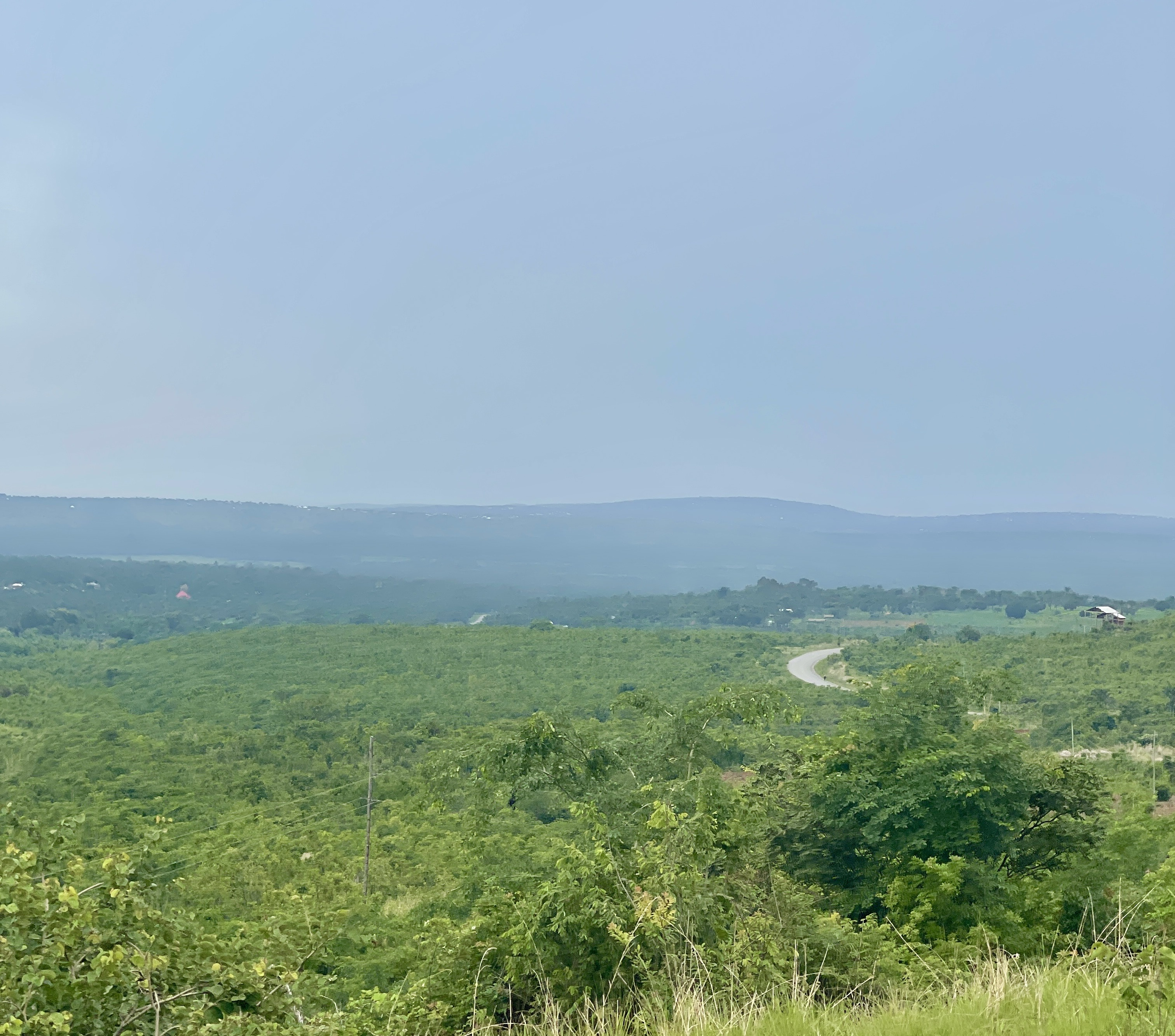
- Landscape in Simbo Ward, Kigoma District

- Location within Tanzania
- Country: Tanzania
- Region: Kigoma Region
- District: Kigoma Rural District

Area
  - Total: 172 km^{2} (66 sq mi)
- Elevation: 862 m (2,828 ft)

Population (2016)
  - Total: 34,838
  - Density: 203/km^{2} (525/sq mi)
- Tanzanian Postal Code: 47606

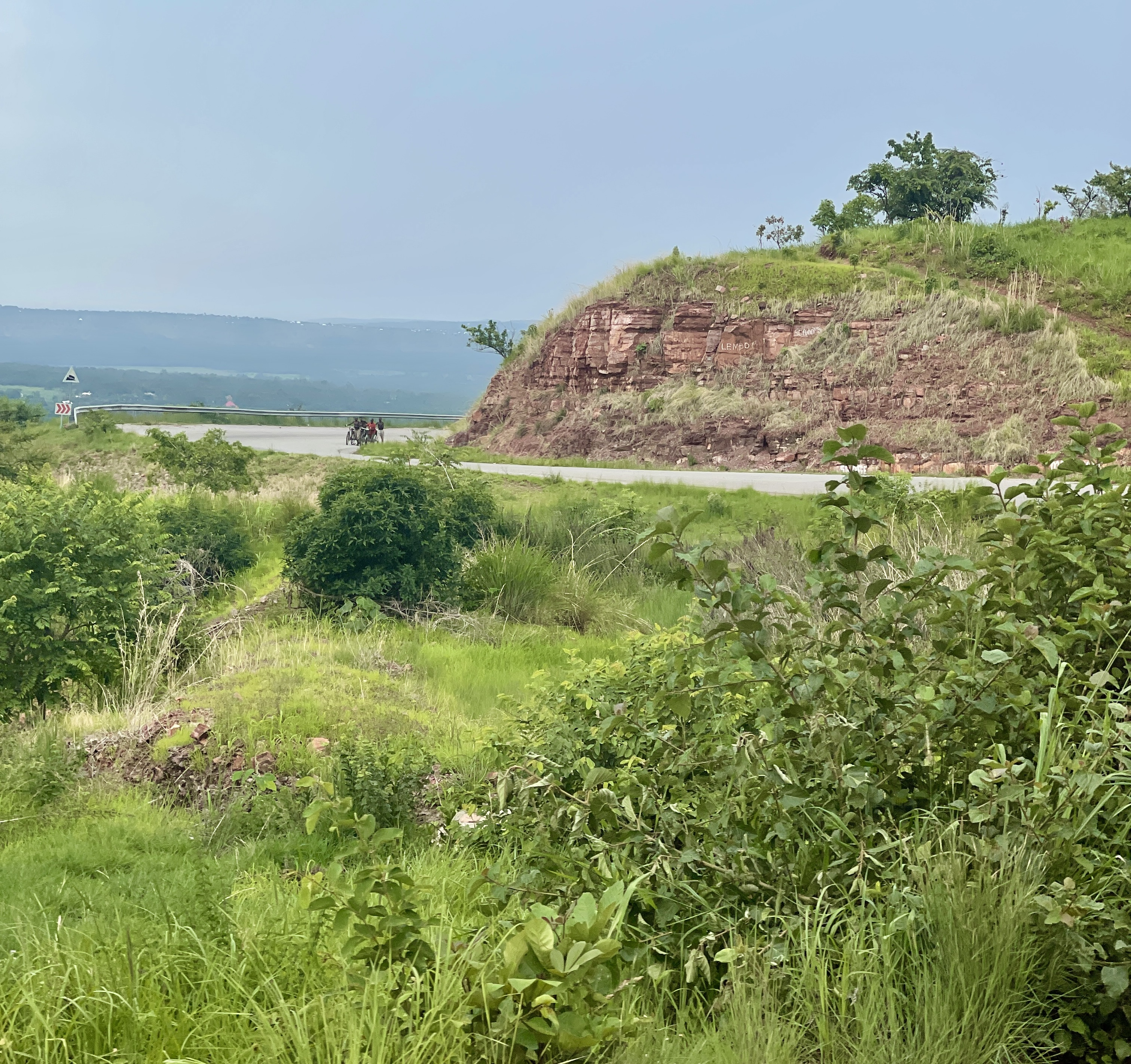
Landscape in Simbo Ward, Kigoma District

Simbo is an administrative ward in Kigoma Rural District of Kigoma Region in Tanzania. Prior to 2014 the ward was in the Uvinza District before moving to the Kigoma District.

The ward covers an area of 172 km^{2} (66 sq mi), and has an average elevation of 862 m (2,828 ft). In 2016 the Tanzania National Bureau of Statistics report there were 34,838 people in the ward, from 31,650 in 2012.

== Hamlets ==
The ward has 7 hamlets.

- Machazo A
- Machazo B
- Machazo C
- Mizizini A
- Mizizini B
- Simbo A Kati
- Simbo B Kati
