= Uvinza–Musongati–Gitega Railway =

Railway line in East Africa

Coordinates: 03°43′56″S 30°05′49″E

Overview
- Status: Under construction
- Termini: Uvinza, Tanzania; Gitega, Burundi

Service
- Type: Heavy rail
- Operator: Tanzania–Burundi Railway Authority

History
- Opened: 2027 (Expected)

Technical
- Line length: 240 km (150 mi)
- Track gauge: 1,000 mm (3 ft 3 3/8 in) metre gauge

The Uvinza–Musongati–Gitega Railway is a planned railway line linking the town of Uvinza in Tanzania to the city of Gitega in Burundi, passing through the town of Musongati, Burundi, close to the common border between the two countries.

== Location ==
The railway line would start at the town of Uvinza in Uvinza District in the Kigoma Region of Tanzania. The line would travel in a general northwesterly direction to the town of Musongati, in Musongati Commune, Rutana Province, in Burundi, approximately 242.5 kilometres (151 mi), from Uvinza. From there the line would continue northwestwards, an estimated 51 kilometres (32 mi) through Burundi, to end at Gitega, the capital city of the country. The total length of the railway line, which does not always follow the road is estimated at 241 kilometres (150 mi).

== Overview ==
This proposed 1000 mm (3 ft 3 3/8 in) metre gauge railway line is intended to ease the transfer of goods between the port of Dar es Salaam and the city of Gitega. Emphasis is being placed on minerals, especially nickel, which is found in significant quantities in Burundi. Other mineral deposits in the country include vanadium, gold, rare earth minerals, phosphates, kaolin, quartzite and limestone.

Although plans to build a standard gauge railway on this route have been considered, with the possibility of extending the line to Bujumbura and eastern DR Congo, a narrow gauge railway is envisaged to reduce costs.

== Related matters ==
In addition to a narrow gauge railway line, the governments of Burundi and Tanzania are planning to build a nickel refinery in Gitega. The new railway would transport the mineral ore from Musongati, where most of the deposits are located, to the refinery in the capital city. The refined metal would then be transported by rail to Uvinza, for onward transmission to the port of Dar es Salaam for export.

Both governments have set up high level committees to plan and coordinate the implementation of the railway line and related infrastructure projects.

== See also ==
- Metre-gauge railway
