= Buhingu =

Ward in Uvinza District, Kigoma Region

Buhingu Kata ya Buhingu (Swahili)
- Ward
- Kata ya Buhingu, Wilaya ya Uvinza
- Location within Tanzania
- Country: Tanzania
- Region: Kigoma Region
- District: Uvinza District

Area
  - Total: 1,657 km^{2} (640 sq mi)
- Elevation: 901 m (2,956 ft)

Population (2012)
  - Total: 18,682
  - Density: 11.27/km^{2} (29.20/sq mi)
- Tanzanian Postal Code: 47603

Buhingu is an administrative ward in Uvinza District of Kigoma Region in Tanzania. The ward covers an area of 1,673 km^{2} (646 sq mi), and has an average elevation of 901 m (2,956 ft). In 2016 the Tanzania National Bureau of Statistics report there were 18,682 people in the ward, from 16,973 in 2012.

== Villages / neighborhoods ==
The ward has 4 villages and 15 hamlets.

- Kalilani
  - Kabukuyungu
  - Kalolwa
  - Katumba
  - Mahasa
- Nkonkwa
  - Kashela
  - Katembwe
- Katumbi
  - Kariakoo
  - Minago
  - Mteme
  - Tunde
- Buhingu
  - Buhingu A
  - Buhingu B
  - Madukani
  - Rubundui
  - Vilongwa
