= Kandaga, Uvinza =

Ward in Uvinza District, Kigoma Region

Kandaga Kata ya Kandaga (Swahili)
- Ward
- Kata ya Kandaga, Wilaya ya Uvinza
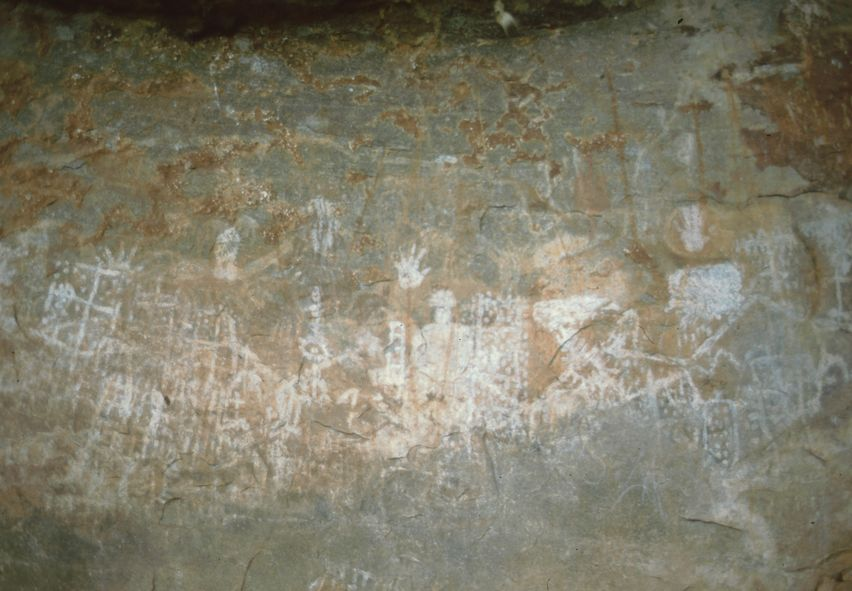
- Rock art in Kandaga

- Location within Tanzania
- Country: Tanzania
- Region: Kigoma Region
- District: Uvinza District

Area
  - Total: 168.7 km^{2} (65.1 sq mi)
- Elevation: 954 m (3,130 ft)

Population (2016)
  - Total: 26,083
  - Density: 154.6/km^{2} (400.4/sq mi)
- Time zone: UTC+3
- Tanzanian Postal Code: 47607

Kandaga is an administrative ward in Uvinza District of Kigoma Region in Tanzania. The ward covers an area of 168.7 km^{2} (65.1 sq mi), and has an average elevation of 954 m (3,130 ft). In 2016 the Tanzania National Bureau of Statistics report there were 26,083 people in the ward, from 23,696 in 2012.

== Villages / hamlets ==
The ward has 5 villages and 37 hamlets.

- Kalenge
  - Hudumani
  - Kibingwe
  - Kilemba
  - Kinombe
  - Majengo
  - Nyanzali
  - Shuza
- Kandaga
  - Hudumani
  - Kafunzo
  - Kagunga A
  - Kagunga B
  - Kalinzi A
  - Kalinzi B
  - Nyamponda
- Kazuramimba
  - Kidea
  - Kilelema A
  - Kilelema B
  - Kilelema C
  - Rubona A
  - Rubona B
  - Rubona C
  - Tambukareli Magharibi
  - Tambukareli Mashariki
- Mlela
  - Bitale A
  - Bitale B
  - Ibolelo
  - Kataragusa
  - Kayana
  - Kitelema
  - Nyamabuye
- Nyanganga
  - Hudumani
  - Majengo
  - Mibangani A
  - Mibangani B
  - Mzungwe
  - Nyabulamba
