= Mkongoro =

Ward in Kigoma District, Kigoma Region

Mkongoro Kata ya Mkongoro (Swahili)
- Ward
- Kata ya Mkongoro, Wilaya ya Kigoma
- Location within Tanzania
- Country: Tanzania
- Region: Kigoma Region
- District: Kigoma District

Area
  - Total: 77.8 km^{2} (30.0 sq mi)
- Elevation: 1,182 m (3,878 ft)

Population (2012)
  - Total: 18,656
  - Density: 240/km^{2} (621/sq mi)
- Tanzanian Postal Code: 47203

Mkongoro is an administrative ward in Kigoma District of Kigoma Region in Tanzania. The ward covers an area of 77.8 km^{2} (30.0 sq mi), and has an average elevation of 1,182 m (3,878 ft). According to the 2012 census, the ward has a total population of 18,656.
