= Kagongo, Kigoma =

Ward of Kigoma District, Kigoma Region

Kagongo Kata ya Kagongo (Swahili)
- Ward
- Kata ya Kagongo, Wilaya ya Kigoma
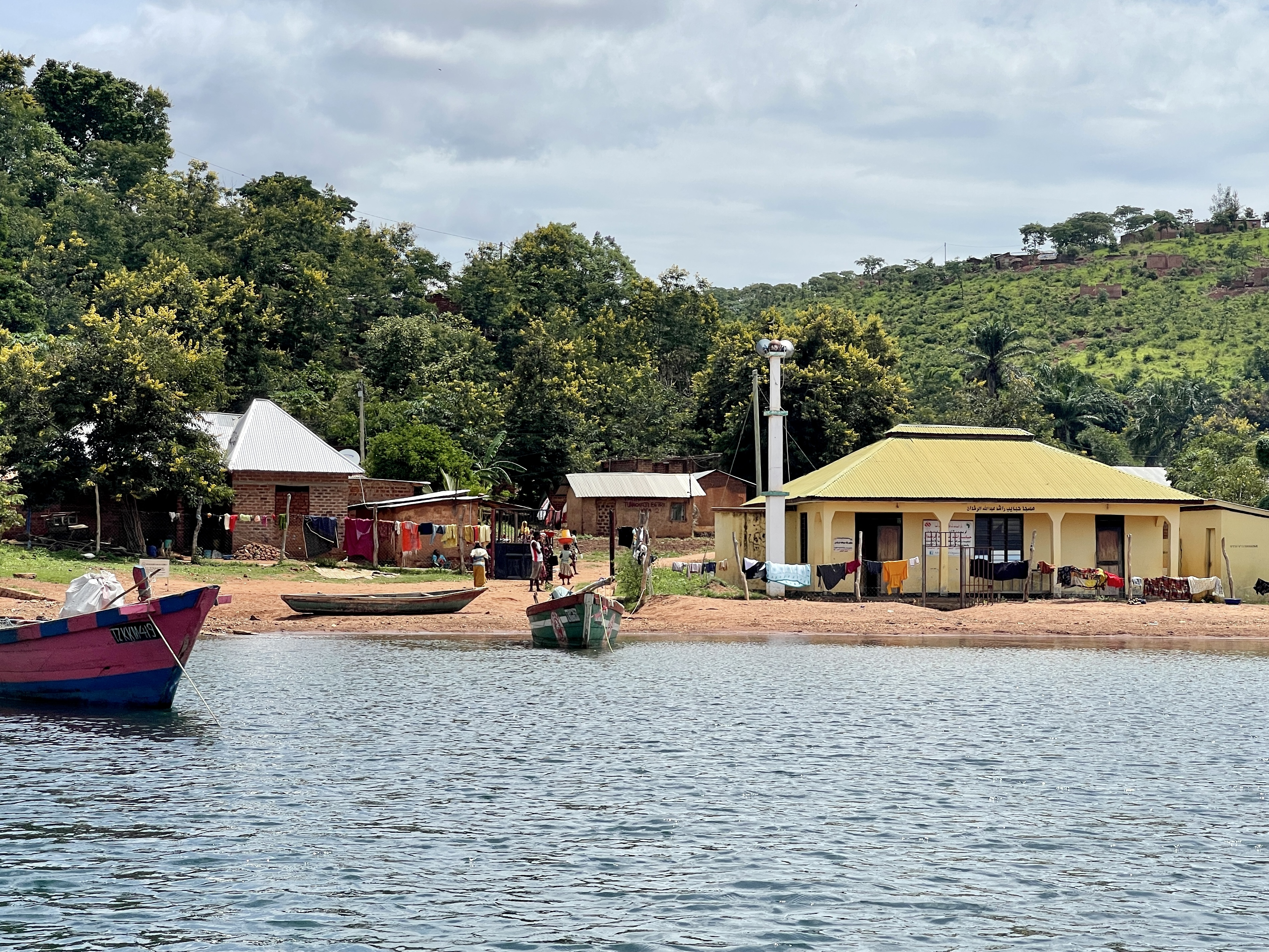
- Masjid in Kalalangabo village, Kagongo Ward, Kigoma District

- Location within Tanzania
- Country: Tanzania
- Region: Kigoma Region
- District: Kigoma District

Area
  - Total: 114.1 km^{2} (44.1 sq mi)
- Elevation: 1,034 m (3,392 ft)

Population (2016)
  - Total: 19,407
  - Density: 170.1/km^{2} (440.5/sq mi)
- Tanzanian Postal Code: 47209

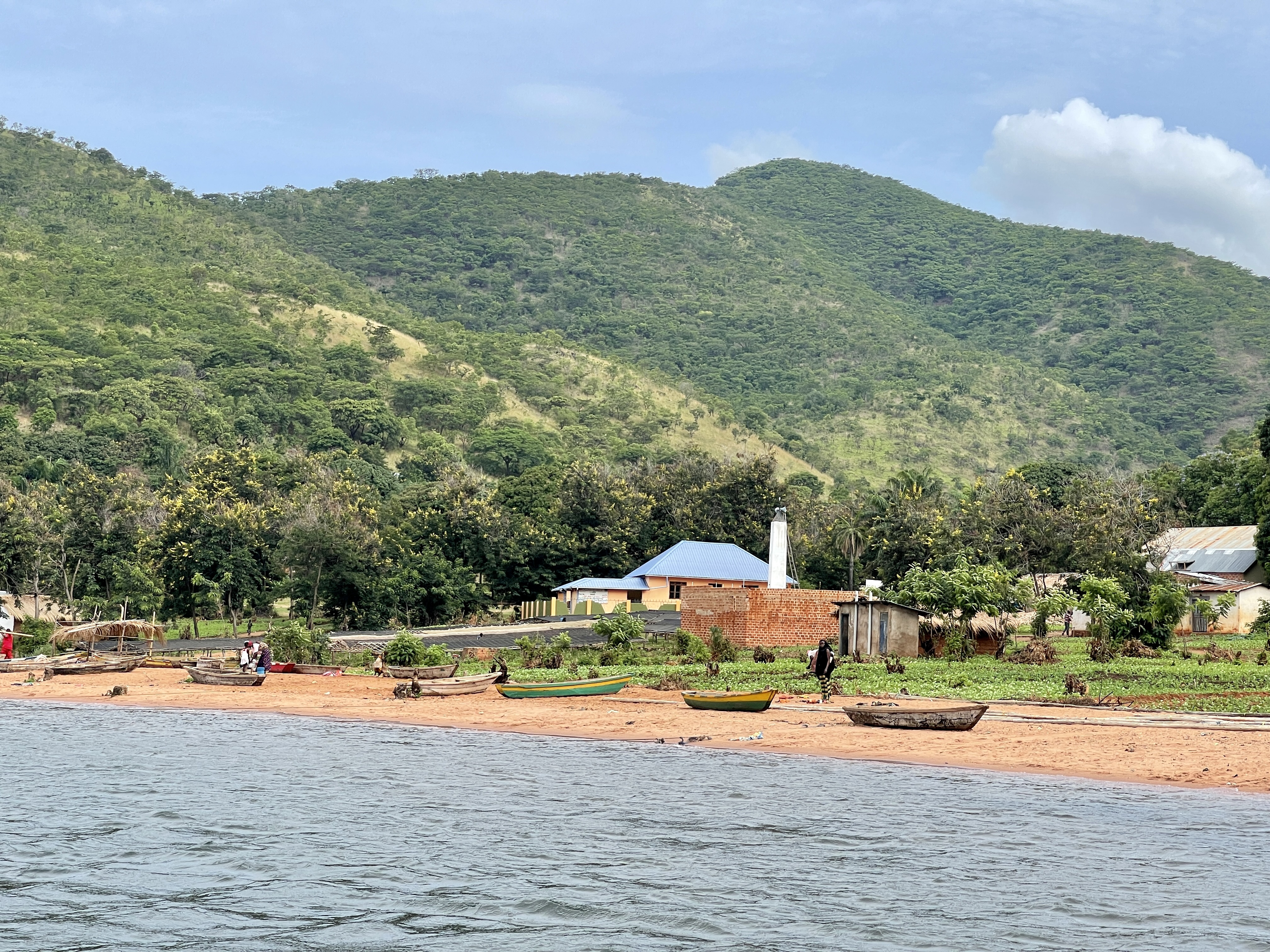
Mtatanga village, Kagongo Ward, Kigoma District

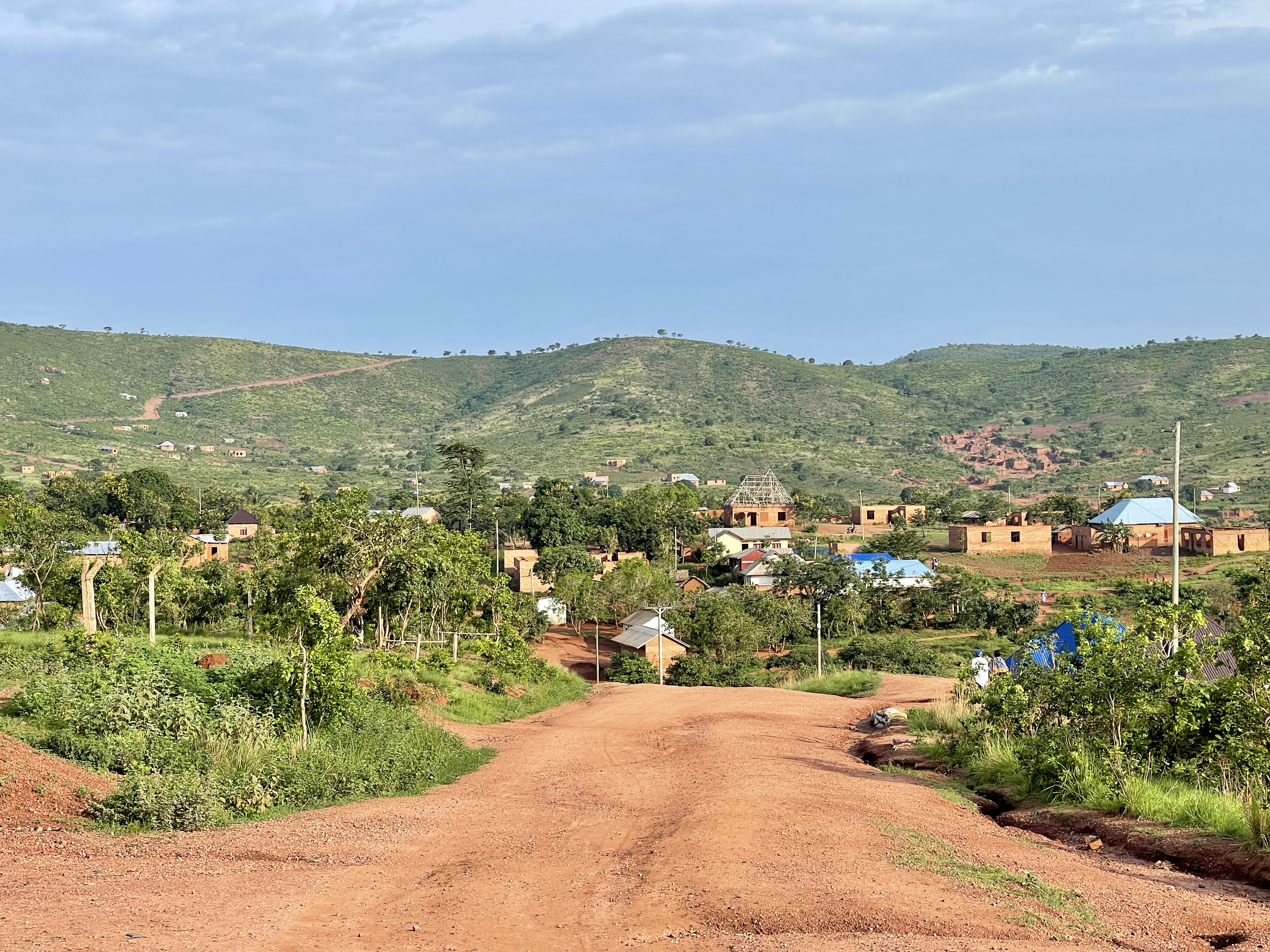
Landscape in Kagongo Ward, Kigoma District

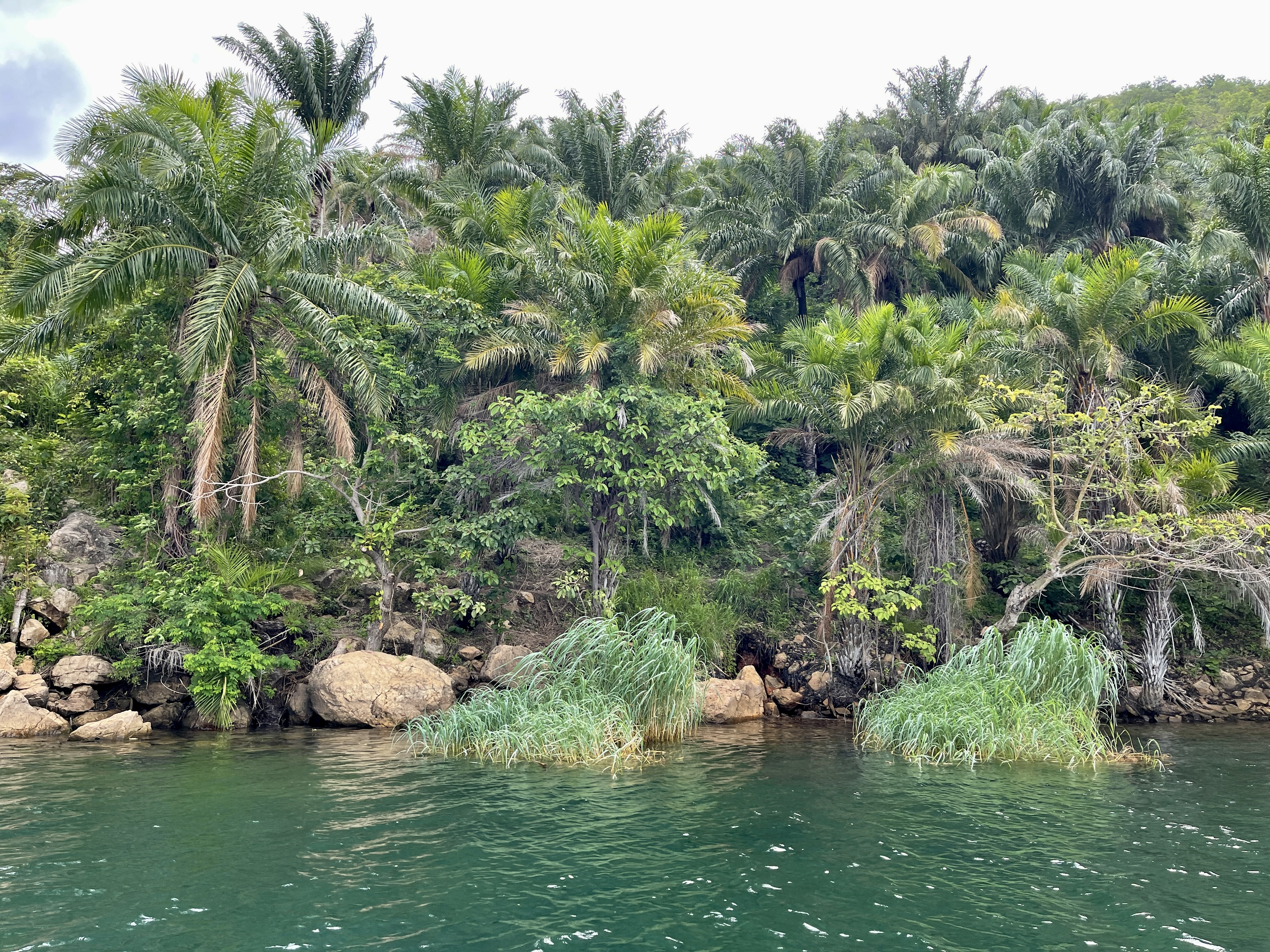
Swamp in Kagongo Ward, Kigoma District

Kagongo is an administrative ward in Kigoma District of Kigoma Region in Tanzania. The ward covers an area of 114.1 km^{2} (44.1 sq mi), and has an average elevation of 1,034 m (3,392 ft). In 2016 the Tanzania National Bureau of Statistics report there were 10,252 people in the ward, from 19,407 in 2012. Prior to 2014 Ziwani Ward was villages in the Kagongo Ward before splitting off to its own new ward.

== Villages / neighborhoods ==
The ward has 5 villages and 26 hamlets.

- Kigalye
  - Kagongo Ziwani
  - Kahamiye
  - Kigalye
  - Nyantore
- Kagongo
  - Bulunda
  - Bungu
  - Burombo
  - Kalukozi
  - Kitakata
  - Sanze
- Kalalangabo
  - Kalalangabo
  - Kichangani
  - Lugongoni
  - Ziwani B
- Mgaraganza
  - Kagina
  - Katombo
  - Kilembela
  - Mgaraganza
  - Mlati
  - Msela
- Mtanga
  - Kazinga
  - Kizuka
  - Miramba
  - Mtanga A
  - Mtanga B
  - Ngelwa
