= Matendo =

Ward of Kigoma District, Kigoma Region

Matendo Kata ya Matendo (Swahili)
- Ward
- Kata ya Matendo, Wilaya ya Kigoma
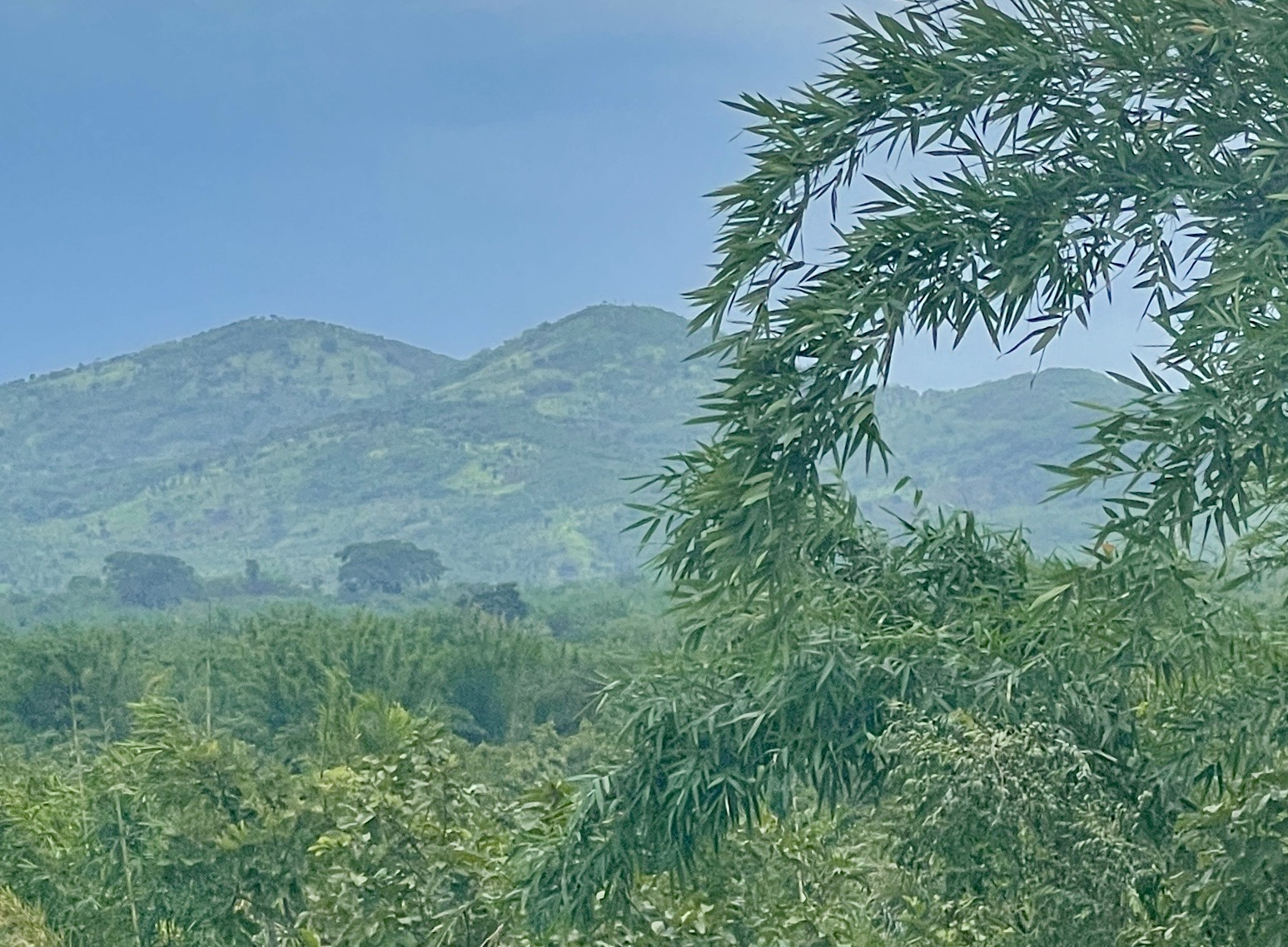
- Landscape in Matendo Ward, Kigoma District

- Location within Tanzania
- Country: Tanzania
- Region: Kigoma Region
- District: Kigoma District

Area
  - Total: 175.4 km^{2} (67.7 sq mi)
- Elevation: 969 m (3,179 ft)

Population (2016)
  - Total: 14,306
  - Density: 81.56/km^{2} (211.2/sq mi)
- Tanzanian Postal Code: 47209

Matendo is an administrative ward in Kigoma District of Kigoma Region in Tanzania. The ward covers an area of 175.4 km^{2} (67.7 sq mi), and has an average elevation of 969 m (3,179 ft). In 2016, according to the Tanzania National Bureau of Statistics report, there were 14,306 people in the ward, from 22,458 in 2012. Prior to 2014 Kidahwe Ward was a village in the Matendo Ward before splitting off to form its won new ward.

== Villages / neighborhoods ==
The ward has 3 villages and 12 hamlets.

- Matendo
  - Kibalini
  - Kibumba
  - Kinogodo
  - Kumuhama
  - Majengo
- Samwa
  - Mkuti
  - Nyamiaga
  - Tunguruza Shuleni
- Pamila
  - Mibangani
  - Pamila
  - Rukaranka
  - Samwa
