= Igalula =

Ward in Uvinza District, Kigoma Region

Igalula Kata ya Igalula (Swahili)
- Ward
- Kata ya Igalula, Wilaya ya Uvinza
- Location within Tanzania
- Country: Tanzania
- Region: Kigoma Region
- District: Uvinza District

Area
  - Total: 1,228 km^{2} (474 sq mi)
- Elevation: 1,089 m (3,573 ft)

Population (2016)
  - Total: 26,272
  - Density: 21.39/km^{2} (55.41/sq mi)
- Tanzanian Postal Code: 47610

Igalula is an administrative ward in Uvinza District of Kigoma Region in Tanzania. The ward covers an area of 1,228 km^{2} (474 sq mi), and has an average elevation of 1,089 m (3,573 ft). In 2016 the Tanzania National Bureau of Statistics report there were 26,272 people in the ward, from 23,868 in 2012.
