= Kazuramimba =

Ward in Uvinza District, Kigoma Region

Kazuramimba Kata ya Kazuramimba (Swahili)
- Ward
- Kata ya Kazuramimba, Wilaya ya Uvinza
- Location within Tanzania
- Country: Tanzania
- Region: Kigoma Region
- District: Uvinza District

Area
  - Total: 670.6 km^{2} (258.9 sq mi)
- Elevation: 1,030 m (3,380 ft)

Population (2016)
  - Total: 37,551
  - Density: 56.00/km^{2} (145.0/sq mi)
- Tanzanian Postal Code: 47611

Kazuramimba is an administrative ward in Uvinza District of Kigoma Region in Tanzania. The ward covers an area of 670.6 km^{2} (258.9 sq mi), and has an average elevation of 1,030 m (3,380 ft). In 2016 the Tanzania National Bureau of Statistics report there were 37,551 people in the ward, from 34,115 in 2012.

== Hamlets ==
The ward has 9 hamlets.

- Kidea
- Kilelema A
- Kilelema B
- Kilelema C
- Rubona A
- Rubona B
- Rubona C
- Tambukareli Magharibi
- Tambukareli Mashariki
