= Bitale, Kigoma =

Ward in Kigoma District, Kigoma Region

Bitale Kata ya Bitale (Swahili)
- Ward
- Kata ya Bitale, Wilaya ya Kigoma
- Location within Tanzania Location within Africa
- Coordinates: 4°46′0.12″S 29°40′59.88″E
- Country: Tanzania
- Region: Kigoma Region
- District: Kigoma District

Area
  - Total: 48.2 km^{2} (18.6 sq mi)
- Elevation: 1,035 m (3,396 ft)

Population (2016)
  - Total: 22,482
  - Density: 466/km^{2} (1,210/sq mi)
- Tanzanian Postal Code: 47202

Bitale is an administrative ward in Kigoma District of Kigoma Region in Tanzania. The ward covers an area of 48.2 km^{2} (18.6 sq mi), and has an average elevation of 1,035 m (3,396 ft). In 2016 the Tanzania National Bureau of Statistics report there were 22,482 people in the ward, from 20,425 in 2012.

== Villages / neighborhoods ==
The ward has 6 villages and 38 hamlets.

- Kizenga
  - Kaseke
  - Katandala
  - Kizenga Kati
  - Kumnege
  - Nyakiga Stoo
  - Uzinza
- Bitale
  - Bitale Shuleni
  - Bitale Sokoni
  - Bolelo
  - Kisangarani
  - Mlege
  - Nkuruba
  - kayogoro
- Mkongoro
  - CCM Centre
  - Kasagamba
  - Kaseke
  - Majengo A
  - Majengo B
  - Nyamweha Chini
  - Nyamweha Juu
  - Nyete Juu
- Nyamhoza
  - Mlwanga
  - Nyabigufa
  - Nyamhoza Hill
  - Nyamhoza Shuleni
  - Sumpa
- Chankele
  - Buhagala
  - Hwazi
  - Kitelama
  - Mbalizi
  - Mlambi
- Bubango
  - Hwazi
  - Kabasaka
  - Kirundo
  - Kumsenga
  - Mwigogi
  - Nyachanga
  - Nyahande
