= Mungonya =

Ward in Kigoma District, Kigoma Region

Mungonya Kata ya Mungonya (Swahili)
- Ward
- Kata ya Mungonya, Wilaya ya Kigoma
- Location within Tanzania
- Country: Tanzania
- Region: Kigoma Region
- District: Kigoma District

Area
  - Total: 40.2 km^{2} (15.5 sq mi)
- Elevation: 852 m (2,795 ft)

Population (2012)
  - Total: 12,644
  - Density: 315/km^{2} (815/sq mi)
- Tanzanian Postal Code: 47203

Mungonya is an administrative ward in Kigoma District of Kigoma Region in Tanzania. The ward covers an area of 40.2 km^{2} (15.5 sq mi), and has an average elevation of 852 m (2,795 ft). According to the 2012 census, the ward has a total population of 12,644.
