= Vinza language =

Language

Vinza
- Native to: Tanzania
- Ethnicity: Vinza
- Native speakers: (10,000 cited 1987)
- Language family: Niger–Congo?: Atlantic–Congo; Benue–Congo; Bantoid; Bantu; Northeast Bantu; Great Lakes Bantu; Ruanda-Rundi; Vinza

Language codes
- ISO 639-3: vin
- Glottolog: vinz1238
- Guthrie code: JD.67
- ELP: Vinza

- People: Wavinza
- Language: Kivinza
- Country: Uvinza

Vinza is a Bantu language spoken by the Vinza people of Tanzania, approximately in the area of the town of Uvinza. It is closely related to the languages of Rwanda and Burundi, including the Ha language of the northeastern shores of Lake Tanganyika.
