= Kagunga =

Ward in Kigoma District, Kigoma Region

Kagunga Kata ya Kagunga (Swahili)
- Ward
- Kata ya Kagunga, Wilaya ya Kigoma
- Location within Tanzania
- Country: Tanzania
- Region: Kigoma Region
- District: Kigoma District

Area
  - Total: 65 km^{2} (25 sq mi)
- Elevation: 1,035 m (3,396 ft)

Population (2016)
  - Total: 18,681
  - Density: 290/km^{2} (740/sq mi)
- Tanzanian Postal Code: 47207

Kagunga is an administrative ward in Kigoma District of Kigoma Region in Tanzania. The ward covers an area of 65 km^{2} (25 sq mi), and has an average elevation of 1,058 m (3,471 ft). In 2016 the Tanzania National Bureau of Statistics report there were 18,681 people in the ward, from 16,972 in 2012.

== Villages / neighborhoods ==
The ward has 2 villages and 11 hamlets.

- Zashe
  - Mibombo
  - Misemele
  - Mkwale
  - Mwibona
  - Ngonya
- Kagunga
  - Kagunga Na. 1
  - Makombe
  - Mkwale
  - Mramakahono
  - Nyamirambo
  - Rusolo
