= Kalinzi =

Ward in Kigoma District, Kigoma Region

Kalinzi Kata ya Kalinzi (Swahili)
- Ward
- Kata ya Kalinzi, Wilaya ya Kigoma
- Location within Tanzania
- Country: Tanzania
- Region: Kigoma Region
- District: Kigoma District

Area
  - Total: 101.5 km^{2} (39.2 sq mi)
- Elevation: 1,311 m (4,301 ft)

Population (2016)
  - Total: 30,188
  - Density: 297.4/km^{2} (770.3/sq mi)
- Tanzanian Postal Code: 47206

Kalinzi is an administrative ward in Kigoma District of Kigoma Region in Tanzania. The ward covers an area of 101.5 km^{2} (39.2 sq mi), and has an average elevation of 1,311 m (4,301 ft). In 2016 the Tanzania National Bureau of Statistics report there were 30,188 people in the ward, from 27,426 in 2012.

== Villages / neighborhoods ==
The ward has 3 villages and 25 hamlets.

- Kalinzi
  - Businde
  - Kabale
  - Kalinzi
  - Kisozi
  - Kivumu A
  - Kivumu B
  - Mganza
  - Mlangala
  - Mlesi
  - Rusuviwe
- Matyazo
  - Busingo
  - Kibisa
  - Lamiya
  - Lukinzo
  - Matyazo A
  - Matyazo B
  - Mshenyi
- Mkabogo
  - Bugale
  - Kiliabila
  - Kinyabwami
  - Milinzi
  - Mkabogo
  - Msenga
  - Ruhinga A
  - Ruhinga B
