= Mwamgongo =

Ward in Kigoma District, Tanzania

Mwamgongo Kata ya Mwamgongo (Swahili)
- Ward
- Kata ya Mwamgongo, Wilaya ya Kigoma
- Location within Tanzania
- Country: Tanzania
- Region: Kigoma Region
- District: Kigoma District

Area
  - Total: 87.1 km^{2} (33.6 sq mi)
- Elevation: 1,309 m (4,295 ft)

Population (2012)
  - Total: 15,657
  - Density: 180/km^{2} (466/sq mi)
- Tanzanian Postal Code: 47203

Mwamgongo is an administrative ward in Kigoma District of Kigoma Region in Tanzania. The ward covers an area of 87.1 km^{2} (33.6 sq mi), and has an average elevation of 1,309 m (4,295 ft). According to the 2012 census, the ward has a total population of 15,657.
