= Sunuka =

Ward in Uvinza District, Kigoma Region

Sunuka Kata ya Sunuka (Swahili)
- Ward
- Kata ya Sunuka, Wilaya ya Uvinza
- Location within Tanzania
- Country: Tanzania
- Region: Kigoma Region
- District: Uvinza District

Area
  - Total: 799 km^{2} (308 sq mi)
- Elevation: 930 m (3,050 ft)

Population (2012)
  - Total: 39,651
  - Density: 49.6/km^{2} (129/sq mi)
- Tanzanian Postal Code: 47608

Sunuka is an administrative ward in Uvinza District of Kigoma Region in Tanzania. The ward covers an area of 799 km^{2} (308 sq mi), and has an average elevation of 930 m (3,050 ft). In 2016 the Tanzania National Bureau of Statistics report there were 39,651 people in the ward, from 36,023 in 2012.

== Villages / neighborhoods ==
The ward has 5 villages and 24 hamlets.

- Kirando
  - Kirando
  - Msehezi
  - Nyamamba
  - Nyamkima
  - Nyamsimbi
- Lyabusende
  - Kabongo
  - Lyabusende
  - Mtakuja
- Karago
  - Kitekati
  - Kitentakuja
  - Legezamwendo
  - Mviga
  - Mwamko
- Sunuka
  - Kinyaba
  - Lulinga
  - Mafundikani
  - Msombwezi
  - Sunuka
- Songambele
  - Anzerani
  - Gagwe
  - Gambazi
  - Ilolo
  - Nyandiga
- Kanywangili
  - Kanywangili A
  - Kanywangili B
  - Kamigunga
