= Mkigo =

Ward in Kigoma District, Kigoma Region

Mkigo Kata ya Mkigo (Swahili)
- Ward
- Kata ya Mkigo, Wilaya ya Kigoma
- Location within Tanzania
- Country: Tanzania
- Region: Kigoma Region
- District: Kigoma District

Area
  - Total: 80 km^{2} (31 sq mi)
- Elevation: 1,594 m (5,230 ft)

Population (2016)
  - Total: 7,478
  - Density: 93/km^{2} (240/sq mi)
- Tanzanian Postal Code: 47201

Mkigo is an administrative ward in Kigoma District of Kigoma Region in Tanzania. The ward covers an area of 80 km^{2} (31 sq mi), and has an average elevation of 1,594 m (5,230 ft). In 2016 the Tanzania National Bureau of Statistics report there were 7,478 people in the ward, from 16,252 in 2012. Prior to 2014 Nyarubanda village and its hamlets were are part of the Mikigo Ward until they split off to for their own new ward.

== Villages / neighborhoods ==
The ward has 8 hamlets.

- Katonyanga
- Kibimba
- Kilemba
- Kumsasa
- Msenga A
- Msenga B
- Mtikamba
- Nyamshisha
