= Uvinza Ward =

Ward in Uvinza District, Kigoma Region

Uvinza
- Ward and Town
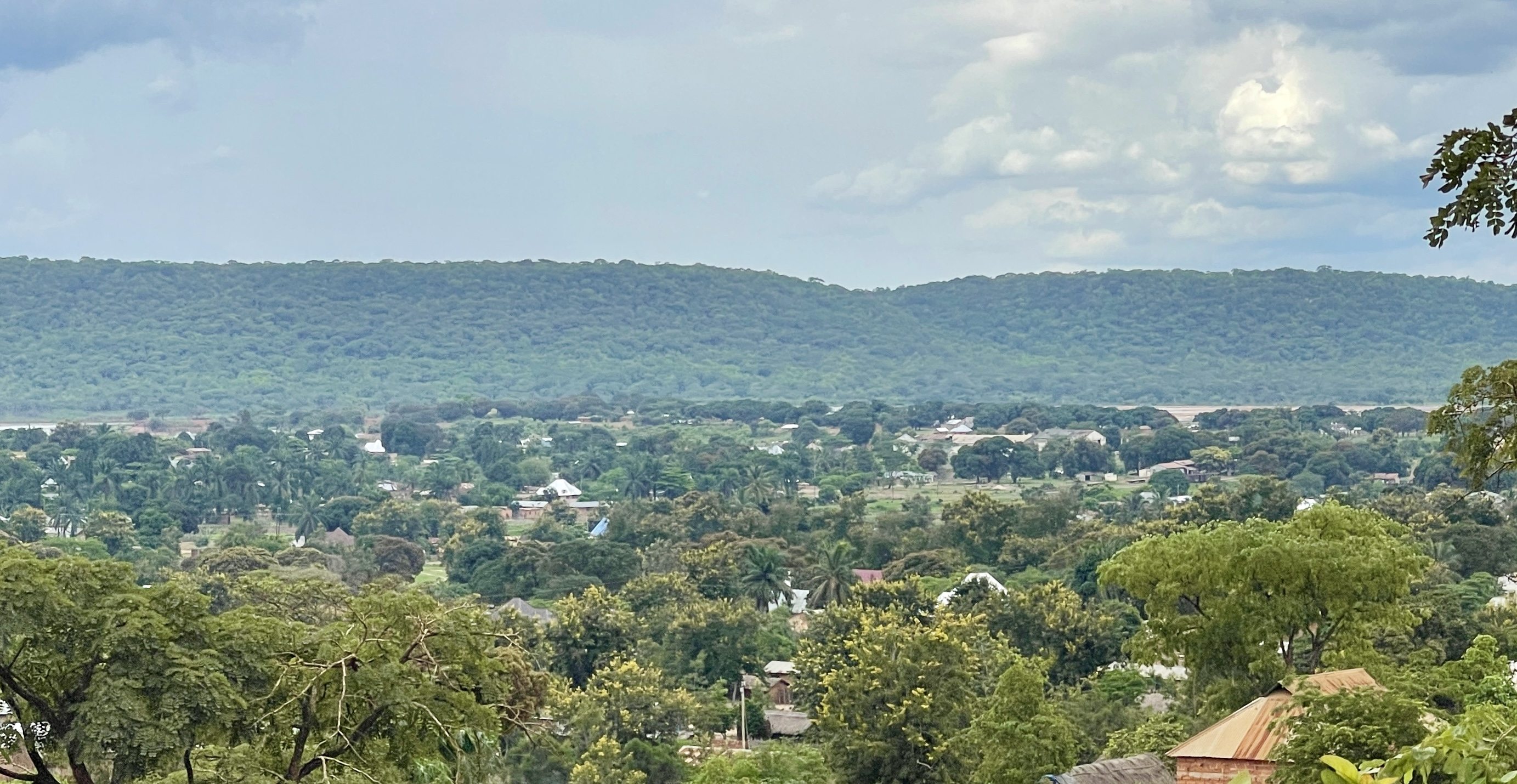
- Panorama of Uvinza Ward, Uvinza District

- Location within Tanzania
- Country: Tanzania
- Region: Kigoma Region
- District: Uvinza District

Area
  - Total: 1,502 km^{2} (580 sq mi)
- Elevation: 1,073 m (3,520 ft)

Population (2016)
  - Total: 24,122
  - Density: 16.06/km^{2} (41.60/sq mi)
- Tanzanian Postal Code: 47601

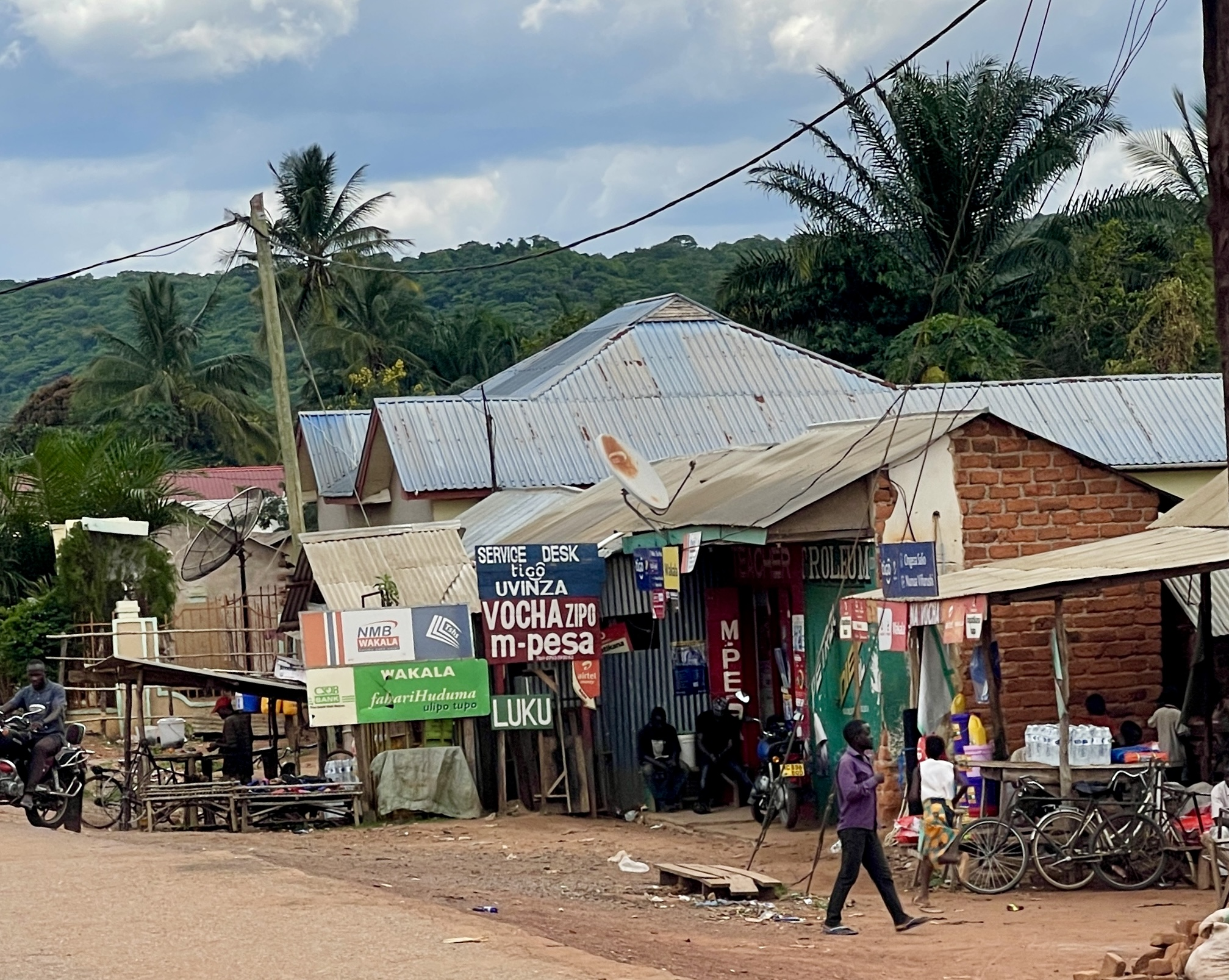
Street Scene in Uvinza Town, Uvinza District.

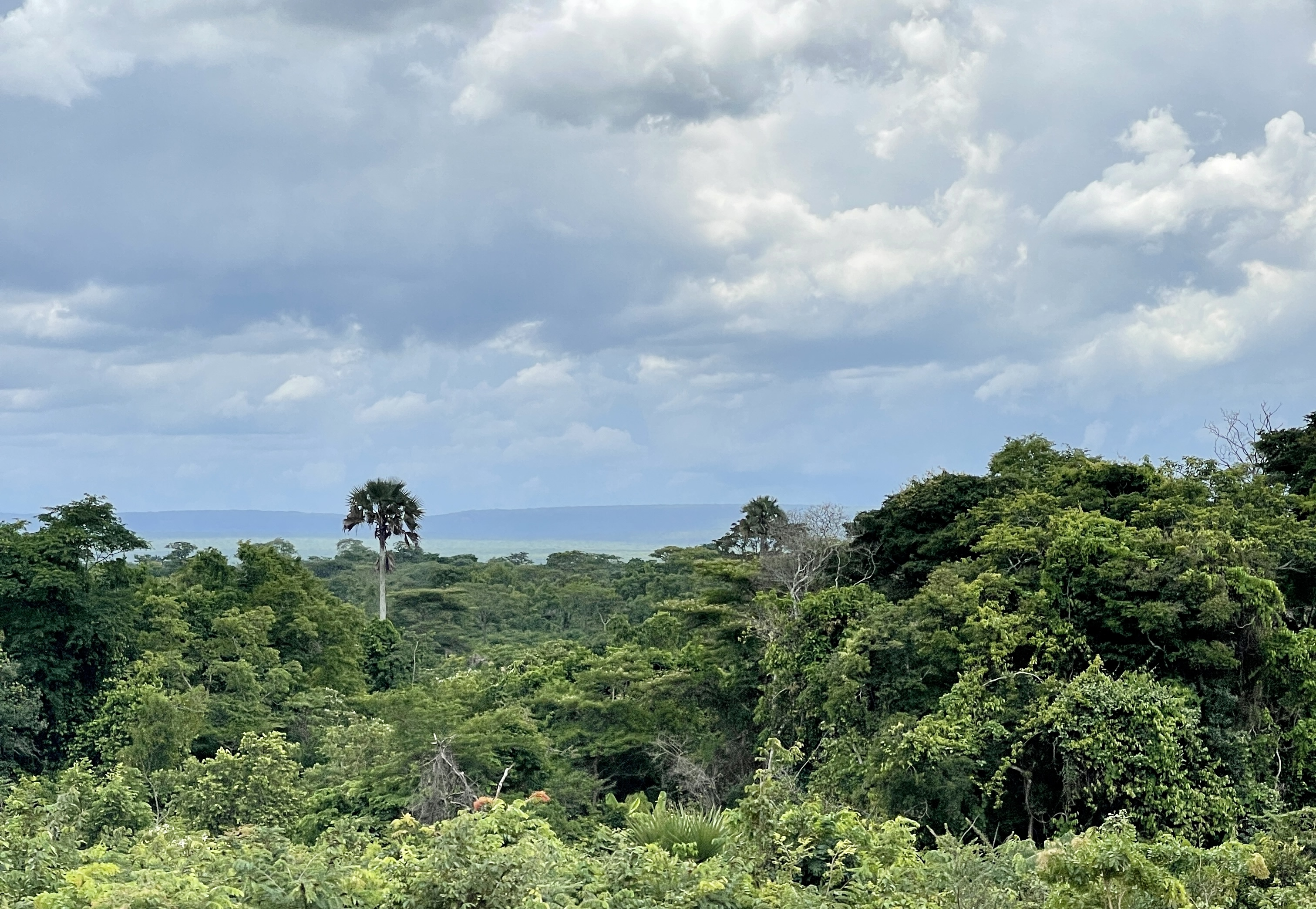
Landscape in Uvinza Ward, Uvinza District

Uvinza is an administrative ward and town in Uvinza District of Kigoma Region in Tanzania. The town is the district capital of Uvinza District. The ward covers an area of 1,502 km^{2} (580 sq mi), and has an average elevation of 1,073 m (3,520 ft). The town is home to salt mining industry in Kigoma region. Uvinza town is situated between where the Ruchugi River and Malagarasi Rivers merge. In 2016, the Tanzania National Bureau of Statistics report there were 24,122 people in the ward, from 35,231 in 2012. Prior to 2014, the Basanza was a village in the Uvinza Ward before splitting off to form its own ward.

== Villages / hamlets ==
The ward has 3 villages and 21 hamlets.

- Chakulu
  - Chakulu
  - Ilunde
  - Kagembe
  - Kitali
  - Rukaki
- Mwamila
  - Kazaroho
  - Mibangani
  - Mtakuja
  - Songambele
- Uvinza
  - Gungu
  - Jumuiya
  - Kansibu
  - Kashari
  - Kasulu Road
  - Kazaroho
  - Logongoni
  - Majengo
  - Msimba
  - Nyanza
  - Ruchugi
  - Uvinza Kati
