= Ilagala =

Ward in Uvinza District, Kigoma Region

Ilagala Kata ya Ilagala (Swahili)
- Ward
- Kata ya Ilagala, Wilaya ya Uvinza
- Location within Tanzania
- Country: Tanzania
- Region: Kigoma Region
- District: Uvinza District

Area
  - Total: 570 km^{2} (220 sq mi)
- Elevation: 975 m (3,199 ft)

Population (2012)
  - Total: 29,333
  - Density: 51/km^{2} (130/sq mi)
- Tanzanian Postal Code: 47609

Ilagala is an administrative ward in Uvinza District of Kigoma Region in Tanzania. The ward covers an area of 570 km^{2} (220 sq mi), and has an average elevation of 975 m (3,199 ft). In 2016 the Tanzania National Bureau of Statistics report there were 29,333 people in the ward, from 47,026 in 2012. Prior to 2014 the village of Mwakizega was in the Igalula Ward before splitting off to become the Mwakizega Ward.

== Villages / neighborhoods ==
The ward has 2 villages and 11 hamlets.

- Ilagala
  - Kabuyange
  - Katete
  - Lugogoni
  - Lugongoni
  - Machazo
  - Mahanga
  - Msambara
- Kajeje
  - Kajeje A
  - Kajeje B
  - Mkanga
  - Tundegambazi
