= Sigunga =

Ward in Uvinza District, Kigoma Region

Sigunga Kata ya Sigunga (Swahili)
- Ward
- Kata ya Sigunga, Wilaya ya Uvinza
- Location within Tanzania
- Country: Tanzania
- Region: Kigoma Region
- District: Uvinza District

Area
  - Total: 770.7 km^{2} (297.6 sq mi)
- Elevation: 1,156 m (3,793 ft)

Population (2016)
  - Total: 12,335
  - Density: 16.00/km^{2} (41.45/sq mi)
- Tanzanian Postal Code: 47604

Sigunga is an administrative ward in Uvinza District of Kigoma Region in Tanzania. The ward covers an area of 770.7 km^{2} (297.6 sq mi), and has an average elevation of 1,156 m (3,793 ft). In 2016 the Tanzania National Bureau of Statistics report there were 12,335 people in the ward, from 20,455 in 2012. Prior to 2014 the Herembe village was a part of Siguna Ward before it split off to form the Herembe Ward.

== Villages / neighborhoods ==
The ward has 2 villages and 16 hamlets.

- Kaparamsenga
  - Itiga Mashariki
  - Itigi/Kapara Kaskazini
  - Itigi/Kapara Magharibi
  - Itigi/Kapara Magharibi
  - Kaparamsenga Kusini
  - Kaparamsenga Mashariki
  - Lusambo
  - Pungu
- Sigunga
  - Kagwena
  - Kahama
  - Kahwibili
  - Katale
  - Kiboko
  - Kichangani
  - Mgangasima
  - Sigoma
