= Vinza people =

Ethnic group in Kigoma Region, Tanzania

Wavinza

Regions with significant populations
- Tanzania: 19,000

Languages
- Vinza language

Religion
- Majority Islam (70%) significant minority Christianity (30%)

- People: Wavinza
- Language: Kivinza
- Country: Uvinza

The Vinza (Wavinza in Swahili) are a Bantu ethnic and linguistic group based in Uvinza District of Kigoma Region, Tanzania. In 1987 the Vinza population was estimated to be 10,000. The Vinza people speak the Vinza language, also known as Kivinza, which belongs to the Central Bantu language family. Many Vinza people also speak the Swahili language. The Vinza are also sometimes called Binza and Mabinza.

Uvinza, the homeland of the Vinza people

== History ==
=== Early history ===
The Vinza people are thought to have migrated from Cameroon, but this is not certain. However, they definitely migrated from Central Africa approximately 2,000 BCE. As the Vinza journeyed to modern-day Tanzania, they picked up aspects of different cultures and societies they encountered. Eventually, the Vinza settled in the northwestern area of the Great Lakes in Tanzania as a mixed people group.

=== Establishment of Uvinza ===
After settling in Tanzania, the Vinza founded Uvinza as a small salt mining village and the main home for the Vinza. Nearby Uvinza, there were multiple brine springs, which made the location strategic for salt mining. The Vinza expertly used these springs to their advantage in the salt trade, but salt mining remained as a small scale operation. In the 1800s, the Vinza had adopted a chief as their ruler, which strengthened the salt mining operation in the Uvinza. Soon after, Arab immigrants traveling east across Tanzania spread Islam to the Vinza.

=== Arrival of the Germans and German Conquest of Uvinza ===
In the late 1800s, spreading hostilities with the Germans began to adversely impact the salt trade. These hostilities were caused by the Nyamwezi, Hehe, among other ethnicities who had rebellious battles with Germany at the time. Eventually, the Germans and Vinza started having a hostile relationship with each other too. As a result, Germany defeated the chief of Uvinza, chief Rulenege. Due to his defeat, chief Rulenenge fled Uvinza, so his death circumstances remain unknown. In 1885, Germany successfully conquered Uvinza along with its brine springs. Under German control, Uvinza was known as Neu Gottorp.

=== Twentieth Century ===
After German conquest, Uvinza and Tanganyika (German East Africa) remained under German rule until 1918. Vinza communities were massacred under German colonial rule. Additionally, Germany actively exploited the numerous natural resources of Uvinza, especially salt. As a result, the Vinza people were forced to in salt operations for long periods of the day with little revenue. However, German colonialism of Uvinza left behind important infrastructure such as a railway, which is still used to this day. German occupation also left behind the Nyanza salt mine L.T.D Industry.

After 1918, Germany was punished for their role in World War I, so their colony of German East Africa was given to the United Kingdom. This meant that Uvinza was now controlled by Britain. Later on, The Mandate Territory of Tanganyika gained its independence from Britain in 1961.

== Society and Culture ==
=== Religion ===
Due to the historical, Islamic influence of Arab immigrants, most Vinza are Muslims. There is also a significant number Vinza Christians as a result of Tanzania being influenced by Christian missionaries.
