= Nguruka =

Ward in Uvinza District, Kigoma Region

Nguruka Kata ya Nguruka (Swahili)
- Ward
- Kata ya Nguruka, Wilaya ya Uvinza
- Location within Tanzania
- Country: Tanzania
- Region: Kigoma Region
- District: Uvinza District

Area
  - Total: 138 km^{2} (53 sq mi)
- Elevation: 1,062 m (3,484 ft)

Population (2016)
  - Total: 29,916
  - Density: 217/km^{2} (561/sq mi)
- Tanzanian Postal Code: 47602

Nguruka is an administrative ward in Uvinza District of Kigoma Region in Tanzania. The ward covers an area of 138 km^{2} (53 sq mi), and has an average elevation of 1,062 m (3,484 ft). In 2016 the Tanzania National Bureau of Statistics report there were 29,916 people in the ward, from 27,179 in 2012.

== Villages / neighborhoods ==
The ward has 4 villages and 22 hamlets.

- Bweru Bweru
  - Bweru Kusini
  - Kaguruka
  - Kaskazini
  - Majengo
  - Ruhama
- Itebula
  - Itebula
  - Kalemela
  - Kamfuba
  - Lugongoni
  - Songati A
  - Songati B
- Nguruka
  - Chemchem
  - Mkoronga
  - Nguruka Kaskazini
  - Nguruka Kusini
- Nyangabo
  - Bulilang’ombe
  - Humule
  - Nyangabo Kaskazini
  - Nyangabo Kati
  - Nyangabo Kusini
  - Reli Mpya
  - Zegi
