= Kalya, Uvinza =

Ward in Uvinza District, Kigoma Region

Kalya Kata ya Kalya (Swahili)
- Ward
- Kata ya Kalya, Wilaya ya Uvinza
- Location within Tanzania
- Country: Tanzania
- Region: Kigoma Region
- District: Uvinza District

Area
  - Total: 534.5 km^{2} (206.4 sq mi)
- Elevation: 822 m (2,697 ft)

Population (2016)
  - Total: 24,751
  - Density: 46.31/km^{2} (119.9/sq mi)
- Tanzanian Postal Code: 47605

Kalya is an administrative ward in Uvinza District of Kigoma Region in Tanzania. The ward covers an area of 534.5 km^{2} (206.4 sq mi), and has an average elevation of 822 m (2,697 ft). In 2016 the Tanzania National Bureau of Statistics report there were 24,751 people in the ward, from 22,486 in 2012.

== Villages / neighborhoods ==
The ward has 3 villages and 18 hamlets.

- Sibwesa
  - Katobelo
  - Mtakuja
  - Songambele
  - Tujitegemee
  - Tupendane
- Kalya
  - Kagwila
  - Kankuba
  - Kapama
  - Katunka
  - Mlela
  - Tumbushe
- Kashughulu
  - Kampisa
  - Kisinsa
  - Lufubu
  - Mjimwema
  - Mpanga
  - Ubanda
  - Ugalaba
