= Itebula =

Ward in Uvinza District, Kigoma Region

Itebula Kata ya Itebula (Swahili)
- Ward
- Kata ya Itebula, Wilaya ya Uvinza
- Location within Tanzania
- Country: Tanzania
- Region: Kigoma Region
- District: Uvinza District

Area
  - Total: 459 km^{2} (177 sq mi)
- Elevation: 1,083 m (3,553 ft)

Population (2016)
  - Total: 27,305
  - Density: 59.5/km^{2} (154/sq mi)
- Tanzanian Postal Code: 47614

Itebula is an administrative ward in Uvinza District of Kigoma Region in Tanzania. The ward covers an area of 459 km^{2} (177 sq mi), and has an average elevation of 1,083 m (3,553 ft). In 2016 the Tanzania National Bureau of Statistics report there were 27,305 people in the ward, from 24,807 in 2012.

== Hamlets ==
The ward has 6 hamlets.

- Itebula
- Kalemela
- Kamfuba
- Lugongoni
- Songati A
- Songati B
