= Mtego wa Noti =

Ward in Uvinza District, Kigoma Region

Mtego wa Noti Kata ya Mtego wa Noti (Swahili)
- Ward
- Kata ya Mtego wa Noti, Wilaya ya Uvinza
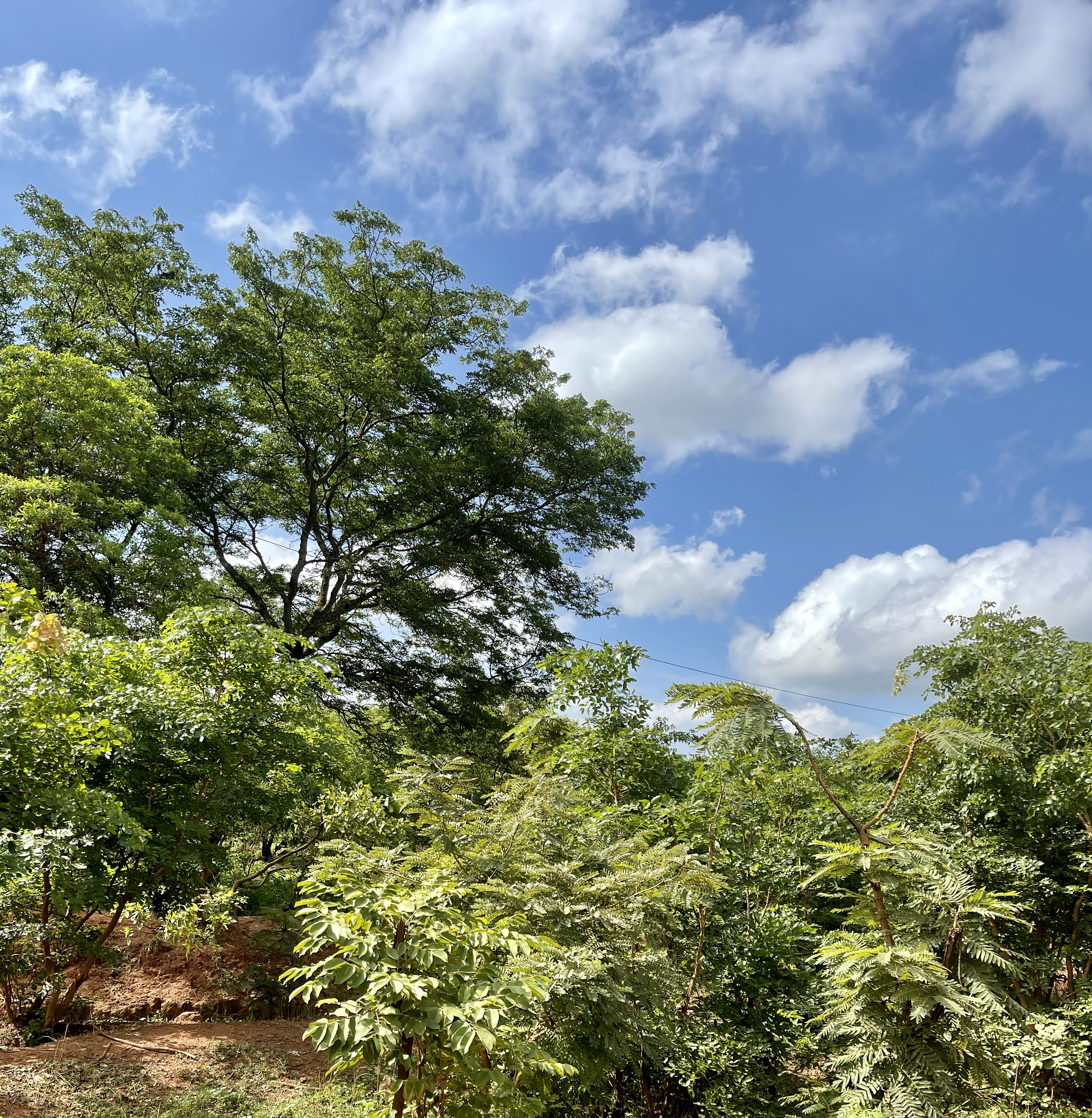
- Landscape in Mtego wa Noti Ward, Uvinza District

- Location within Tanzania
- Country: Tanzania
- Region: Kigoma Region
- District: Uvinza District

Area
  - Total: 293 km^{2} (113 sq mi)
- Elevation: 1,061 m (3,481 ft)

Population (2016)
  - Total: 16,850
  - Density: 57.5/km^{2} (149/sq mi)
- Tanzanian Postal Code: 47613

Mtego wa Noti is an administrative ward in Uvinza District of Kigoma Region in Tanzania. The ward covers an area of 293 km^{2} (113 sq mi), and has an average elevation of 1,061 m (3,481 ft). In 2016 the Tanzania National Bureau of Statistics report there were 16,850 people in the ward, from 15,308 in 2012.
