= Musongati =

Town in Burundi

- Location in Burundi
- Coordinates: 3.72828°S 30.09311°E
- Country: Burundi
- Province: Rutana Province
- Elevation: 1,524 m (5,000 ft)

Musongati is a town in the Commune of Musongati, Rutana Province, in south-eastern Burundi.

== Location ==
Musongati is located in Musongati Commune, Rutana Province, approximately 177 kilometres (110 mi), by road, south-east of Bujumbura, the financial capital and largest city in Burundi. This is approximately 78.5 kilometres (49 mi), by road, south-east of Gitega, the capital city of Burundi.

== Overview ==
Musongati is the location of significant deposits of nickel, platinum, palladium, copper, gold and iron. The minerals are developed by Burundi Musongati Mining (BMM), a public-private-partnership company, co-owned by Kermas Corporation (85 percent) and by the Government of Burundi (15 percent).

== Transport ==
It is on the route of the proposed railway from Tanzania to the Burundi capital Gitega. Therefore, there are unlimited contentions whether they should change the route since Musongati has Nickel deposit and has also numerous chutes of water.

== See also ==
- Transport in Burundi
- Rwanda Standard Gauge Railway
