= Mganza =

Ward in Uvinza District, Kigoma Region

Mganza Kata ya Mganza (Swahili)
- Ward
- Kata ya Mganza, Wilaya ya Uvinza
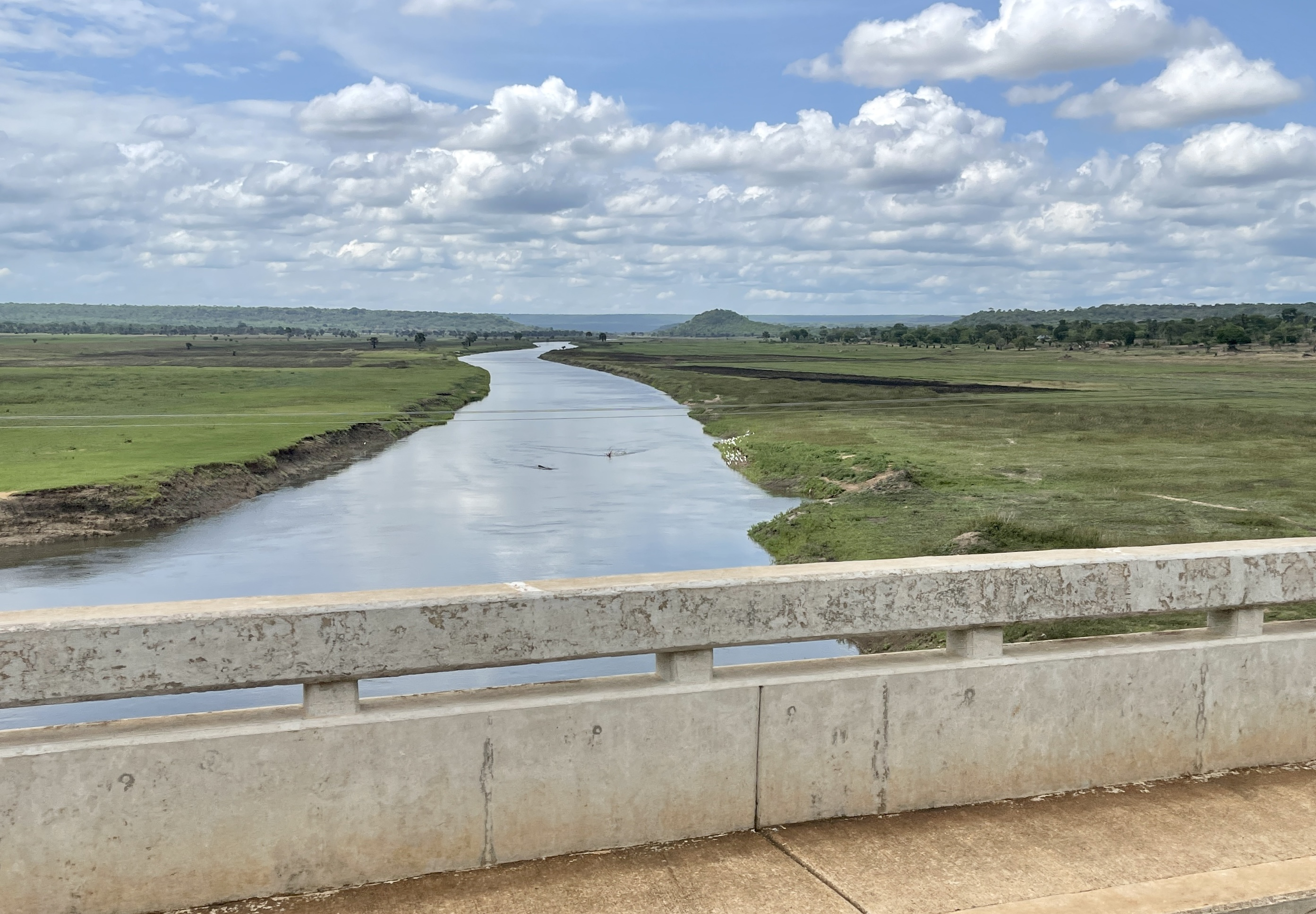
- Malagarasi River in Mganza Ward, Uvinza District

- Location within Tanzania
- Country: Tanzania
- Region: Kigoma Region
- District: Uvinza District

Area
  - Total: 1,090 km^{2} (420 sq mi)
- Elevation: 1,103 m (3,619 ft)

Population (2016)
  - Total: 27,323
  - Density: 25.1/km^{2} (64.9/sq mi)
- Tanzanian Postal Code: 47612

Mganza is an administrative ward in Uvinza District of Kigoma Region in Tanzania. The ward covers an area of 1,090 km^{2} (420 sq mi), and has an average elevation of 1,103 m (3,619 ft). In 2016 the Tanzania National Bureau of Statistics report there were 27,323 people in the ward, from 24,823 in 2012.
