= Mahembe =

Ward in Kigoma District, Kigoma Region

Mahembe Kata ya Mahembe (Swahili)
- Ward
- Kata ya Mahembe, Wilaya ya Kigoma
- Location within Tanzania
- Country: Tanzania
- Region: Kigoma Region
- District: Kigoma District

Area
  - Total: 137.8 km^{2} (53.2 sq mi)
- Elevation: 941 m (3,087 ft)

Population (2016)
  - Total: 14,435
  - Density: 104.8/km^{2} (271.3/sq mi)
- Tanzanian Postal Code: 47201

Mahembe is an administrative ward in Kigoma District of Kigoma Region in Tanzania. The ward covers an area of 137.8 km^{2} (53.2 sq mi), and has an average elevation of 941 m (3,087 ft). In 2016 the Tanzania National Bureau of Statistics report there were 14,435 people in the ward, from 22,763 in 2012. Prior to 2014 Nkungwe was a village in the Mahembe Ward before splitting off into is own ward.

== Villages / neighborhoods ==
The ward has 2 villages and 11 hamlets.

- Mahembe
  - Kagulwe
  - Kaloleni
  - Kaseke
  - Kwisamilo
  - Mahembe
  - Ndelembela A
  - Ndelemela B
- Chankabwimba
  - Chankabwimba
  - Kabanga
  - Kichangachui
  - Mshingisha
