= Commune of Musongati =

Coordinates: 3°42′05″S 30°06′36″E

- Commune
- Interactive map of Commune of Musongati
- Country: Burundi
- Province: Rutana Province
- Administrative center: Musongati
- Time zone: UTC+2 (Central Africa Time)

The commune of Musongati is a commune of Rutana Province in southeastern Burundi. The capital lies at Musongati.
