= Kigoma Rural District =

District of Kigoma Region, Tanzania

Kigoma Wilaya ya Kigoma (Swahili)
- District
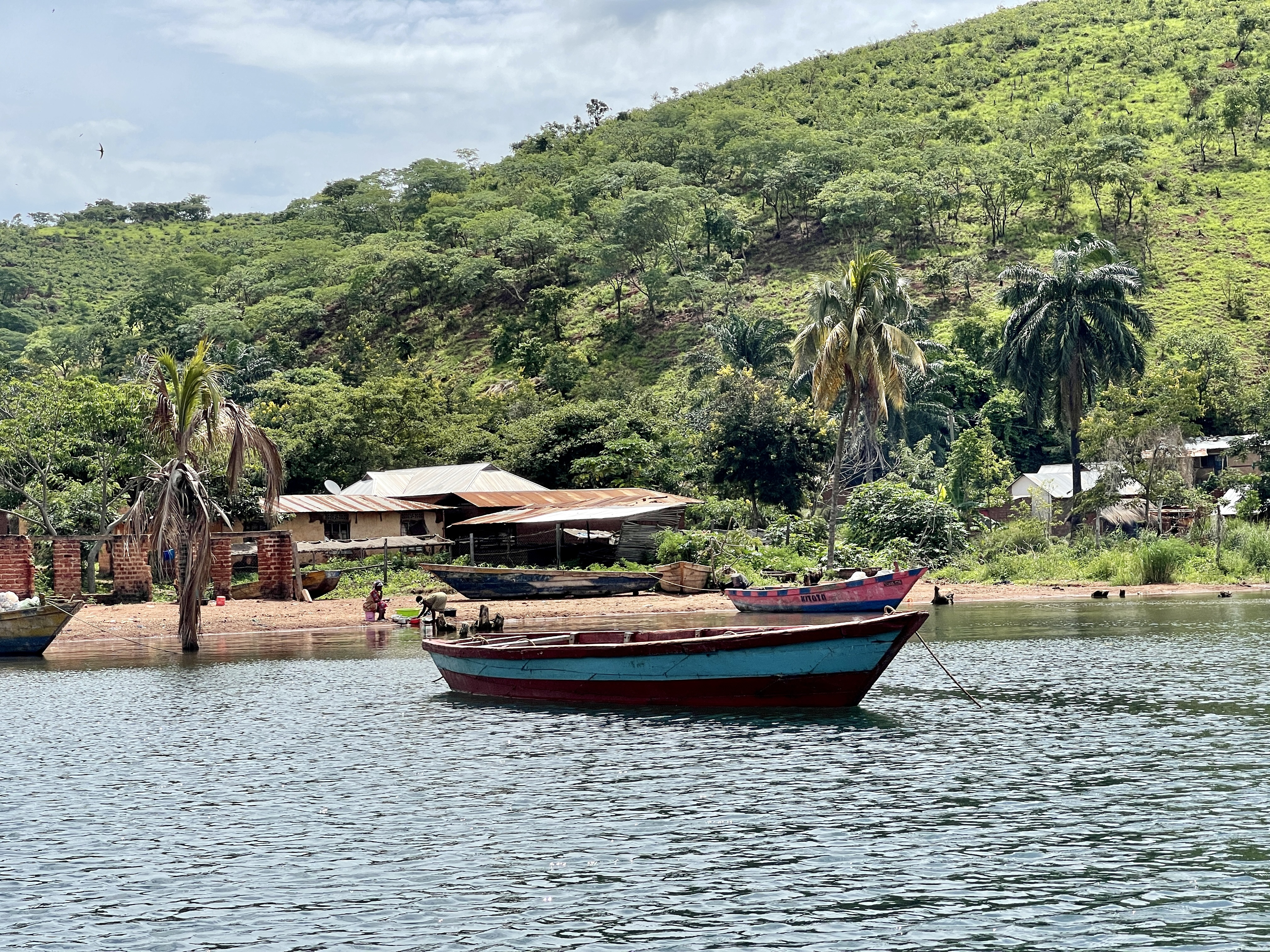
- Fishing boat in Kalalangabo village, Kagongo Ward, Kigoma District
- Nickname: Home to Gombe National Park
- Kigoma District in Kigoma Region
- Coordinates: 04°41′26.88″S 29°42′49.68″E
- Country: Tanzania
- Region: Kigoma Region

Area
  - Total: 967.7 km^{2} (373.6 sq mi)

Population (2016)
  - Total: 267,712
  - Density: 276.6/km^{2} (716.5/sq mi)
- Demonym: District Kigoman
- Postcode: 472xx
- Area code: 028
- Website: District Website

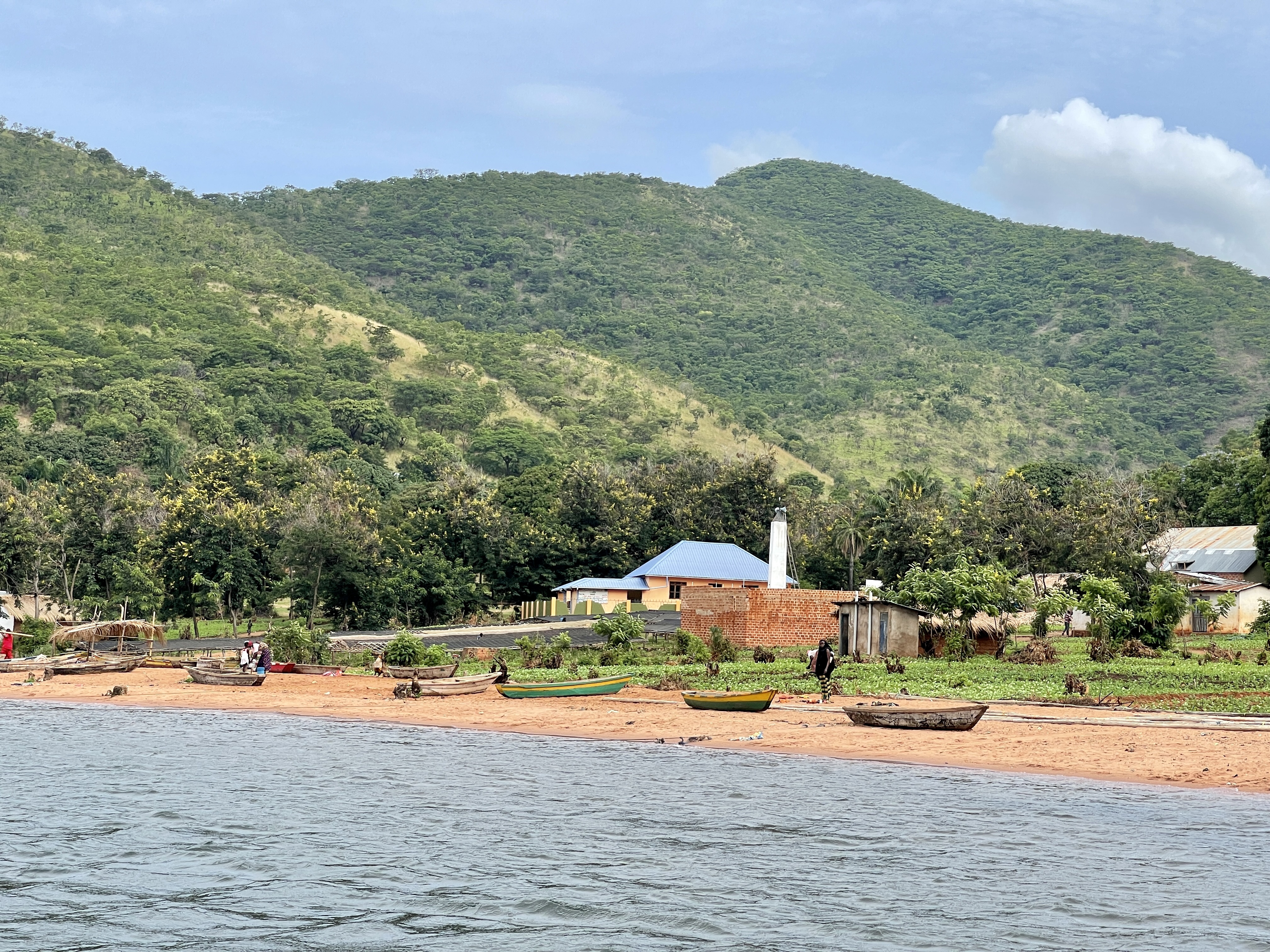
Mtatanga village, Kagongo Ward, Kigoma District

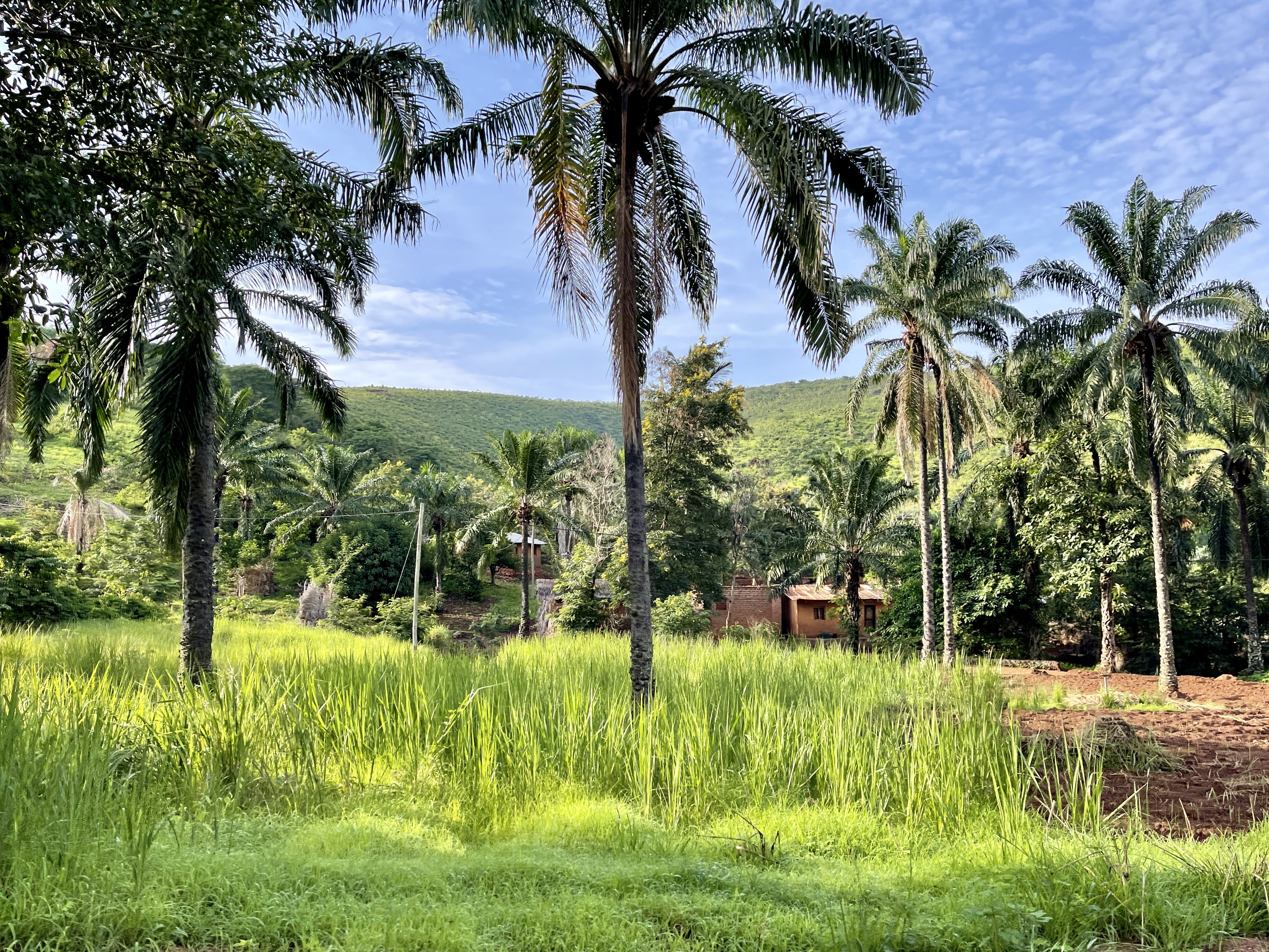
Farms in Kagongo Ward

Kigoma District is one of the eight administrative districts of Kigoma Region in Tanzania. The district lies north of the city of Kigoma-Ujiji. Uvinza District, to the west and south of Ujiji, was split off from the Kigoma District in 1 July, 2013.

== Geography ==
The District covers an area of 967.7 km^{2} (373.6 sq mi), which is about 20.8% of the region's total area. It is bordered to the west by Lake Tanganyika. The district is bordered by Buhigwe District and Kasulu District to the east; Kigoma-Ujiji District and Uvinza District to the south.

== Demographics ==
In 2016 the Tanzania National Bureau of Statistics report there were 267,712 people in the district, from 211,566 in 2012.

The district is of the tribes of Waha, Wabembe, Goma people, Wabwari, and Watongwe. Waha are the largest tribe, making up 95% of the people.

== Administrative subdivisions ==
Kigoma District was administratively divided into 16 wards, 46 villages, and 212 hamlets.

=== Wards ===
- Bitale (22,482)
- Kagongo (10,252)
- Kagunga (18,681)
- Kalinzi (30,188)
- Kidahwe (10,414)
- Mahembe (14,435)
- Matendo (14,306)
- Mkigo (7,478)
- Mkongoro (20,535)
- Mungonya (13,917)
- Mwamgongo (17,234)
- Mwandiga (20,810)
- Nkungwe (10,621)
- Nyarubanda (10,411)
- Simbo (34,838)
- Ziwani (11,110)
