= Uvinza =

District of Kigoma Region, Tanzania

Uvinza Wilaya ya Uvinza (Swahili)
- District
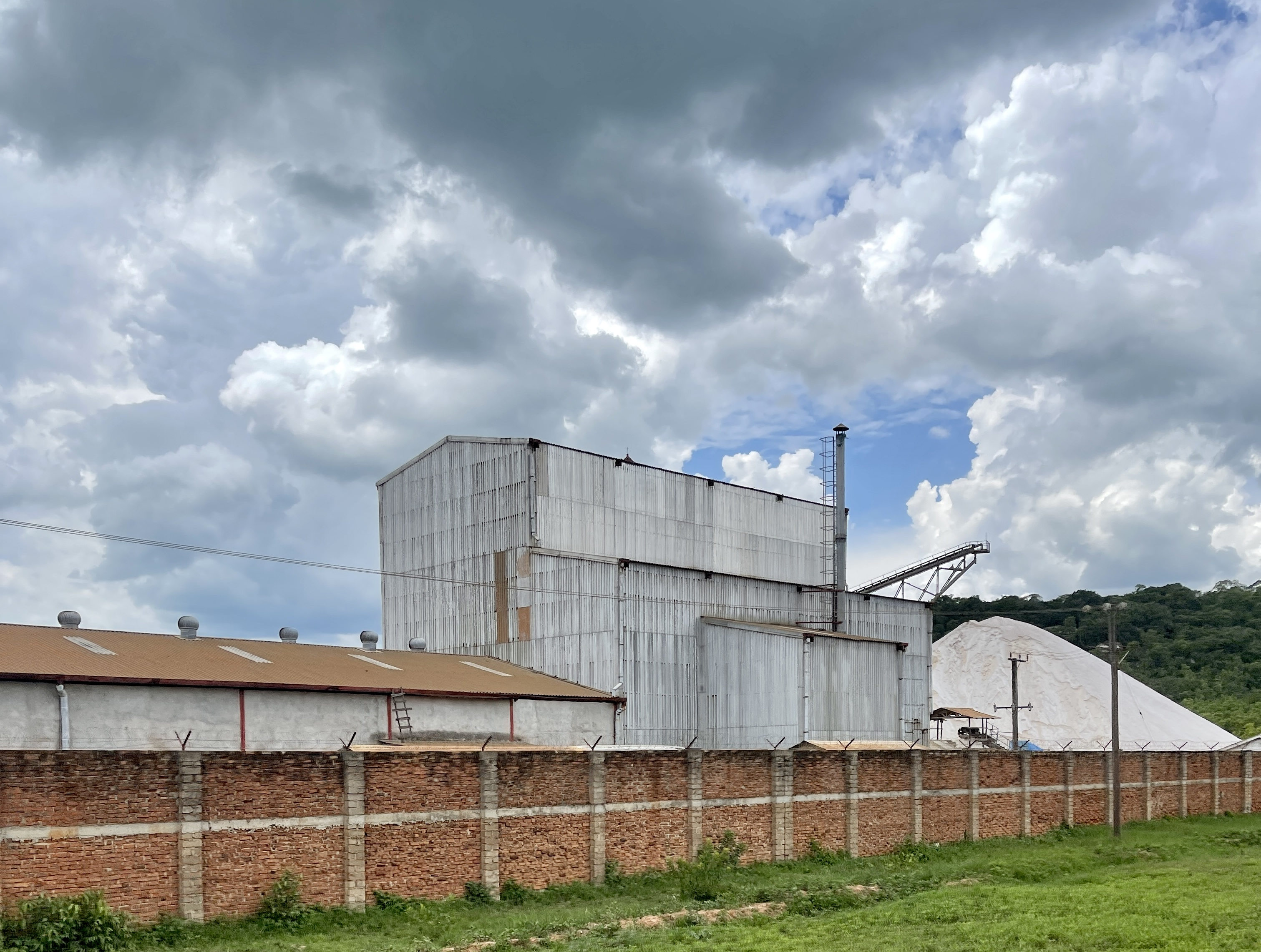
- Salt Factory, Uvinza Ward, Uvinza District

- Coordinates: 5°6′24.84″S 30°23′2.04″E
- Country: Tanzania
- Region: Kigoma Region
- Established: 2011
- Capital: Uvinza

Government
  - Type: Council
  - Chairman: Jackson Mateso
  - Director: Zainabu Suleiman Mbunda

Area
  - Total: 10,058 km^{2} (3,883 sq mi)

Population (2012)
  - Total: 387,442
  - Density: 38.521/km^{2} (99.768/sq mi)
- Demonym: Uvinzan
- Time zone: EAT
- Postcode: 476xx
- Area code: 028
- Website: District Website

- People: Wavinza
- Language: Kivinza
- Country: Uvinza

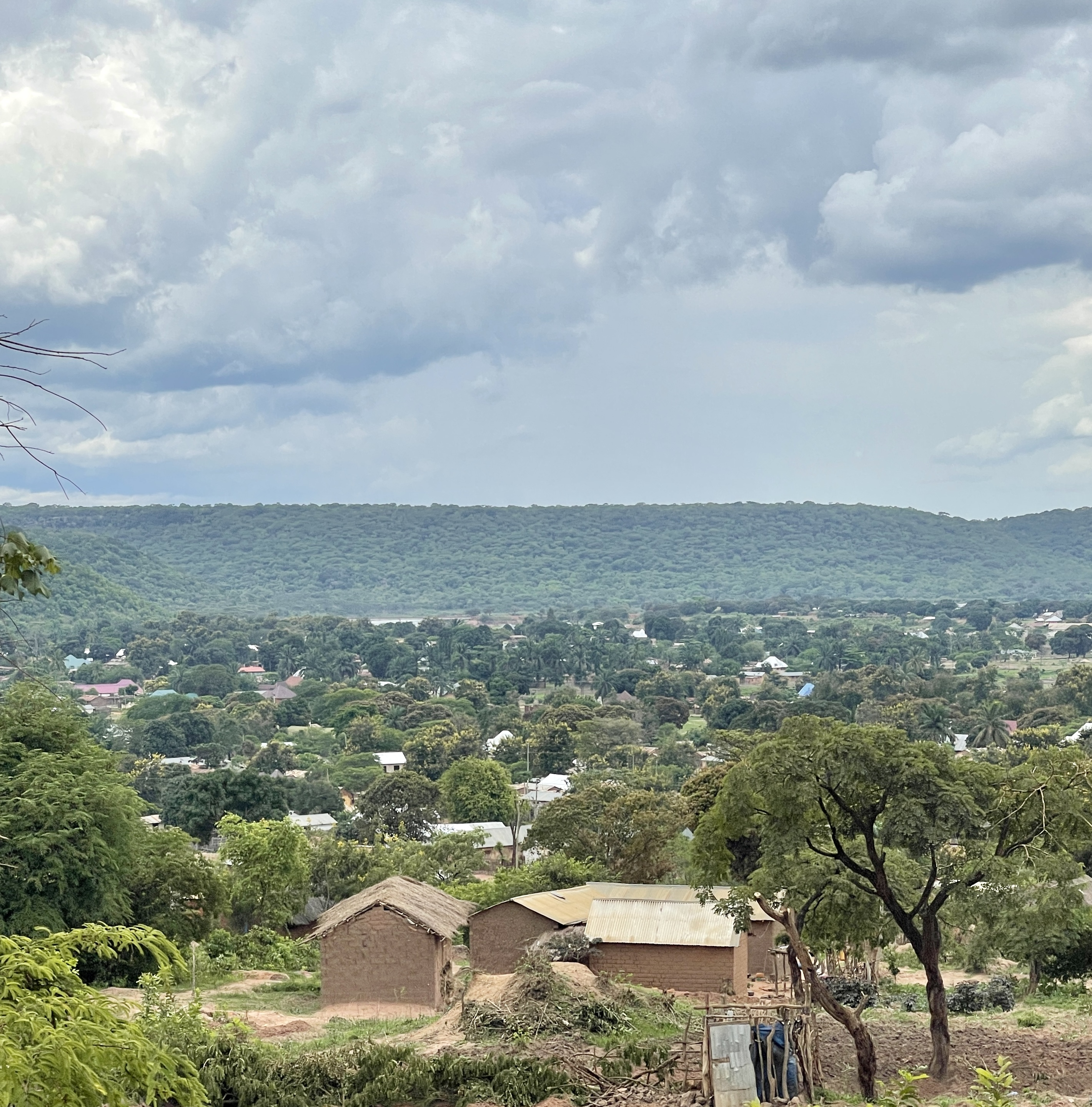
Landscape in Uvinza Town, Uvinza Ward

Uvinza is one of the eight administrative districts of Kigoma Region in Tanzania. Uvinza is bordered to the northwest by Kigoma District and Kigoma-Ujiji District. North of the district is bordered by Kasulu District . Lake Tanganyika borders the district on the west. Mpanda District in Katavi Region borders the district to the south and Kaliua District in Tabora Region borders the district to the east. The district is named in honor of the Vinza people whom the western part of district was their historic kingdom. Southern Uvinza District is home to the Mahale Mountains National Park. A unique park that is home to both Chimpanzees and lions in the same habitat.

== History ==
The area that is currently Uvinza district is historically known for its salt production in Tanzania. Uvinza was ruled by the Vinza people for hundreds of years. During the German colonial period the town was named Neu Gottorp and under their occupation a railway line was built in the 1900s linking it to Dar es Salaam. The district council was created from the Kigoma District on 1 July 2013.

== Geography and Climate ==
Due to its immense size, Uvinza district has diverse geography. It covers an area of 10,058 km^{2} (3,883 sq mi). Thus making it the largest district in the Kigoma region. The district is home to Mahale Mountains National Park and shares the largest coastline to Lake Tanganyika in Kigoma Region. The climate is tropical savanna climate (Köppen climate classification Aw).

== Demographics ==
In 2016 the Tanzania National Bureau of Statistics report there were 387,442 people in the district, from 383,640 in 2012. Average household estimates in 2017 were 5.6, and 4.1% growth a year.

== Economy ==
Uvinza town is the economic heart of Uvinza district. The town has a station on the Tanzanian Railways. The region is dominated by salt production, forestry, and agriculture. Fishing is also one of the economic activities, with the most prominent fish across the country the Nguruka fish. In October 2007, it was proposed to build a branch railway to Bujumbura in Burundi junctioning off from there. It is also served by Uvinza Airport, which is located around 2 miles (3.2 km) northeast of the town center. The airport consists of a single, non-paved airstrip which is approximately 3,000 feet (910 m) long.

There is currently a railway that will go from Uvinza to Gitega planned to be completed in 2027.

== Administrative subdivisions ==
Uvinza District is administratively divided into 16 wards, 61 villages and 328 hamlets. The district's headquarter is at Lubufu. In 2014 the Simbo ward was moved from Uvinza District to the Kigoma District.

=== Wards ===
- Basanza (14,657)
- Buhingu (18,682)
- Herembe (10,181)
- Igalula (26,272)
- Ilagala (29,333)
- Itebula (27,305)
- Kalya (24,751)
- Kandaga (26,083)
- Kazuramimba (37,551)
- Mganza (27,323)
- Mtego wa Noti (16,850)
- Mwakizega (22,429)
- Nguruka (29,916)
- Sigunga (12,335)
- Sunuka (39,651)
- Uvinza (24,122)
