= Mwandiga =

Ward in Kigoma District, Kigoma Region

Mwandiga Kata ya Mwandiga (Swahili)
- Ward
- Kata ya Mwandiga, Wilaya ya Kigoma
- Location within Tanzania
- Country: Tanzania
- Region: Kigoma Region
- District: Kigoma District

Area
  - Total: 40.5 km^{2} (15.6 sq mi)
- Elevation: 860 m (2,820 ft)

Population (2016)
  - Total: 20,810
  - Density: 514/km^{2} (1,330/sq mi)
- Tanzanian Postal Code: 47211

Mwandiga is an administrative ward in Kigoma District of Kigoma Region in Tanzania. The ward covers an area of 40.5 km^{2} (15.6 sq mi), and has an average elevation of 860 m (2,820 ft). In 2016 the Tanzania National Bureau of Statistics report there were 20,810 people in the ward, from 18,906 in 2012.

== Villages / neighborhoods ==
The ward has 3 villages and 21 hamlets.

- Mwandiga
  - Majengo
  - Mgera A
  - Mgera B
  - Mwandiga Kaskazini
  - Mwandiga Magharibi
  - Mwandiga Mashariki
  - Sokoni
  - Uwanjani
- Kibingo
  - Bigabiro A
  - Bigabiro B
  - Kasesa
  - Kibingo A
  - Kibingo B
- Kiganza
  - Bukemba
  - Bweru A
  - Bweru B
  - Kaziba
  - Kiganza CCM
  - Kiganza Kati
  - Kiganza Senta
  - Kitobe
