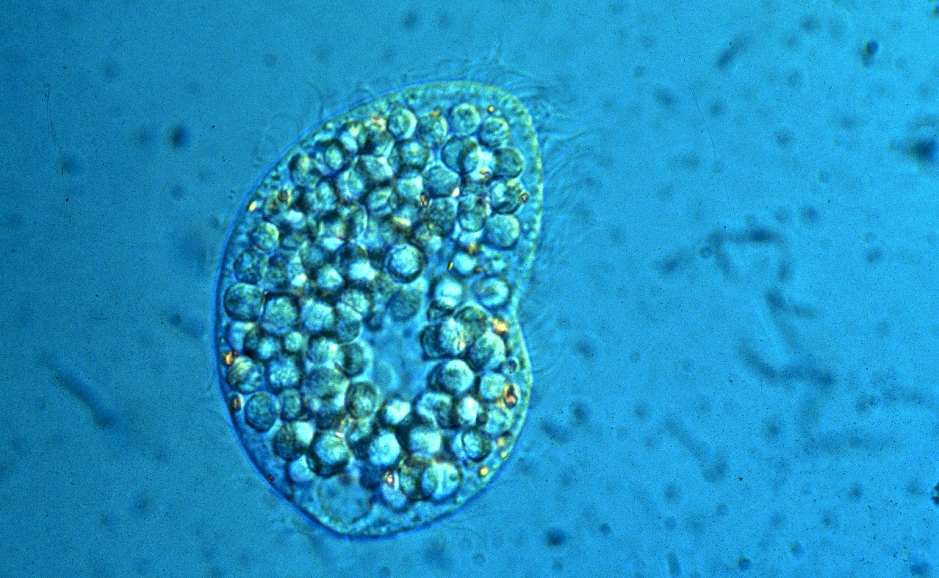

Scientific classification
- Domain: Eukaryota
- Clade: Sar
- Superphylum: Alveolata
- Phylum: Ciliophora
- Class: Colpodea
- Order: Colpodida
- Family: Colpodidae
- Genus: Colpoda
- Species: C. inflata

Binomial name
- Colpoda inflata Stokes, 1884

= Colpoda inflata =

Species of single-celled organism

Colpoda inflata (sometimes called Tillina inflata or Colpoda rouxi) is a unicellular organism, belonging to the genus Colpoda. Colpodeans are eucaryotic protozoans, that mainly feed on bacteria (bacteriophagous), vary a lot in size and have a funnel-shaped vestibule.

== Description ==
Colpoda inflata is 30-90 μm long and is characteristically L-shaped with its oral opening, the vestibule, lying in the corner of the "L". Very well-nourished individuals can also appear reniform. C. inflata has a macronucleus to which a micronucleus is attached, contractile vacuoles, an excretory pore and several extrusomes, although populations without extrusomes have been observed. The ciliature of C. inflata is holotrichous, meaning that it is regularly distributed over the whole cell surface in slightly spiralling lines. With the help of its ciliature, C. inflata alternates between gliding rather clumsily and resting in one spot, circling jerkily.

C. inflata feeds almost exclusively on bacteria, in rare cases on flagellates. Digestion takes place within its 4-8 μm-sized food vacuoles.

== Habitat ==
The species has been found in many different terrestrial habitats like animal dunghills, sewages, meadow puddles, intestines of various reptiles and amphibians, algal coatings on tree-bark, caves and rivers.

== Distribution ==
C. inflata is distributed world-wide and has been described in the USA, Mexico and South America, Central Europe, Africa, Japan, Australia and New Zealand.

== Reproduction ==
Conjugation in Colpodeans has rarely been observed, which is why they are often assumed to reproduce strictly asexual.

Colpoda inflata proliferates by mitosis, resulting in cells that can either form fully developed division cysts (trophonts) or resting cysts. Resting cysts are globular and differ from division cysts by their mucous layer containing many yellow globules and their tolerance for harsh environmental conditions like low nutrient levels. The encystment process lasts about 120–160 hours.

== Relevance in Science ==
Due to the universal distribution and its cultivability C. inflata is an ideal organism for ecological comparisons and can serve as bioindicator. Furthermore, a study has shown, that C. inflata is able to maintain great populations in highly polluted environments, which is why it could play an important role in biofilter technology.
