= Unicellular organism =

Organism that consists of only one cell

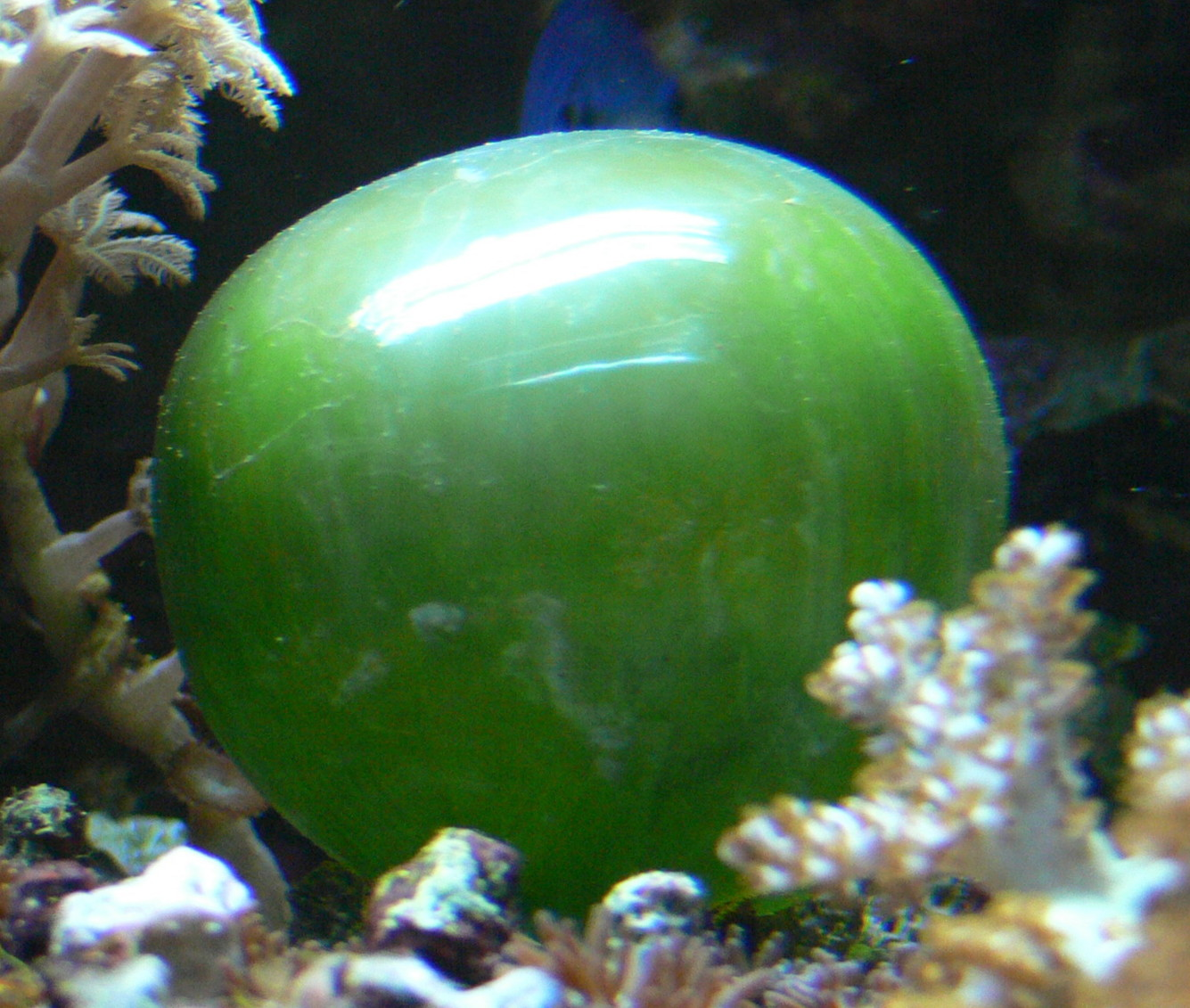
- Valonia ventricosa, a species of alga with a diameter that ranges typically from 1 to 4 centimetres (0.4 to 1.6 in), is among the largest unicellular species

Unicellular organisms, also known as a single-celled organism, is an organism that consists of a single cell, unlike a multicellular organism that consists of multiple cells. Organisms fall into two general categories: prokaryotic organisms and eukaryotic organisms. Most prokaryotes are unicellular and are classified into bacteria and archaea. Many eukaryotes are multicellular, but some are unicellular such as protozoa, unicellular algae, and unicellular fungi. Unicellular organisms are thought to be the oldest form of life, with early organisms emerging 3.5–3.8 billion years ago.

Although some prokaryotes live in colonies, they are not specialised cells with differing functions. These organisms live together, and each cell must carry out all life processes to survive. In contrast, even the simplest multicellular organisms have cells that depend on each other to survive.

Most multicellular organisms have a unicellular life-cycle stage. Gametes, for example, are reproductive unicells for multicellular organisms.

Some organisms are partially unicellular, like Dictyostelium discoideum. Additionally, unicellular organisms can be multinucleate, like Caulerpa, Plasmodium, and Myxogastria.

== Evolutionary hypothesis ==
Life timeline
← / Earth formed; ← / Earliest water; ← / LUCA; ← / Earliest fossils; ← / Great Oxygenation Event; ← / Sexual reproduction; ← / Earliest fungi; ← / Neoproterozoic oxygenation event; ← / Ediacaran biota; ← / Cambrian explosion; ← / Earliest tetrapods; ← / Earliest hominoid
(million years ago)

The origin of life is largely still a mystery. Primitive protocells are thought to be the precursors to today's unicellular organisms.

In one theory, known as the RNA world hypothesis, early RNA molecules would have been the basis for catalyzing organic chemical reactions and self-replication.

Compartmentalization was necessary for chemical reactions to be more likely as well as to differentiate reactions with the external environment. For example, an early RNA replicator ribozyme may have replicated other replicator ribozymes and different RNA sequences if not kept separate. Such hypothetic cells with an RNA genome instead of the usual DNA genome are called 'ribocells' or 'ribocytes'.

When amphiphiles like lipids are placed in water, the hydrophobic tails aggregate to form micelles and vesicles, with the hydrophilic ends facing outwards. Primitive cells likely used self-assembling fatty-acid vesicles to separate chemical reactions and the environment. Because of their simplicity and ability to self-assemble in water, it is likely that these simple membranes predated other forms of early biological molecules.

== Prokaryotes ==
Prokaryotes lack membrane-bound organelles, such as mitochondria or a nucleus. Instead, most prokaryotes have an irregular region that contains DNA, known as the nucleoid. Most prokaryotes have a single, circular chromosome, which is in contrast to eukaryotes, which typically have linear chromosomes. Nutritionally, prokaryotes have the ability to utilize a wide range of organic and inorganic material for use in metabolism, including sulfur, cellulose, ammonia, or nitrite. Prokaryotes are relatively ubiquitous in the environment and some (known as extremophiles) thrive in extreme environments.

=== Bacteria ===
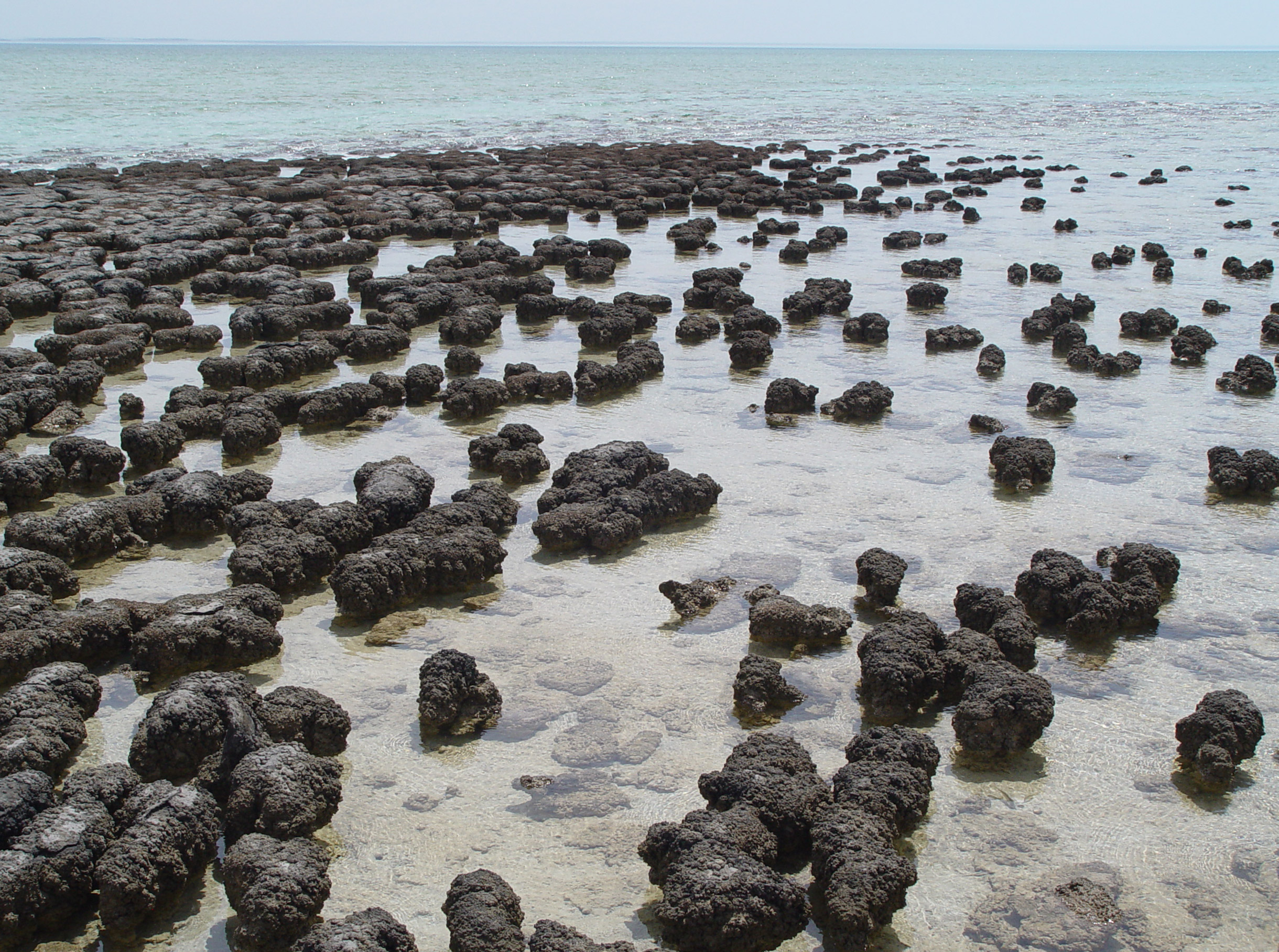
Modern stromatolites in Shark Bay, Western Australia. It can take a century for a stromatolite to grow 5 cm.

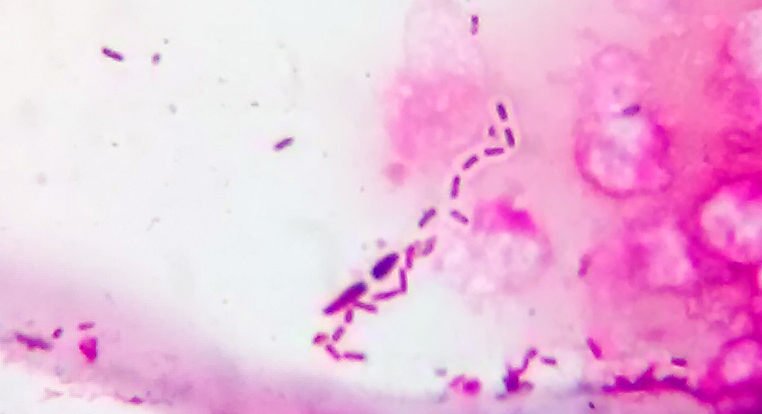
Bacteria in a capsule

Bacteria are one of the world's oldest forms of life, and are found virtually everywhere on Earth. Many common bacteria have plasmids, which are short, circular, self-replicating DNA molecules that are separate from the bacterial chromosome. Plasmids can carry genes responsible for novel abilities, of current critical importance being antibiotic resistance. Bacteria predominantly reproduce asexually through a process called binary fission. However, about 80 different species can undergo a sexual process referred to as natural genetic transformation. Transformation is a bacterial process for transferring DNA from one cell to another, and is apparently an adaptation for repairing DNA damage in the recipient cell. In addition, plasmids can be exchanged through the use of a pilus in a process known as conjugation.

The photosynthetic cyanobacteria are arguably the most successful bacteria, and changed the early atmosphere of the Earth by oxygenating it. Stromatolites, structures made up of layers of calcium carbonate and trapped sediment left over from cyanobacteria and associated community bacteria, left behind extensive fossil records. The existence of stromatolites gives an excellent record as to the development of cyanobacteria, which are represented across the Archaean (4 billion to 2.5 billion years ago), Proterozoic (2.5 billion to 540 million years ago), and Phanerozoic (540 million years ago to present day) eons. Much of the fossilized stromatolites of the world can be found in Western Australia. There, some of the oldest stromatolites have been found, some dating back to about 3,430 million years ago.

Clonal aging occurs naturally in bacteria, and is apparently due to the accumulation of damage that can happen even in the absence of external stressors.

=== Archaea ===
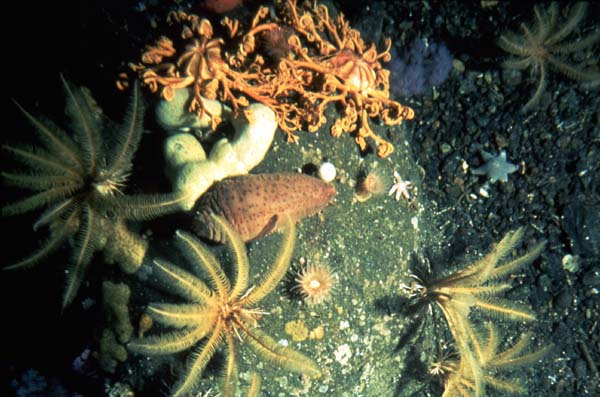
A bottom-dwelling community found deep in the European Arctic.

Hydrothermal vents release heat and hydrogen sulfide, allowing extremophiles to survive using chemolithotrophic growth. Archaea are generally similar in appearance to bacteria, hence their original classification as bacteria, but have significant molecular differences most notably in their membrane structure and ribosomal RNA. By sequencing the ribosomal RNA, it was found that the Archaea most likely split from bacteria and were the precursors to modern eukaryotes, and are actually more phylogenetically related to eukaryotes. As their name suggests, Archaea comes from a Greek word archaios, meaning original, ancient, or primitive.

Some archaea inhabit the most biologically inhospitable environments on earth, and this is believed to in some ways mimic the early, harsh conditions that life was likely exposed to. Examples of these Archaean extremophiles are as follows:

- Thermophiles, optimum growth temperature of 50 °C-110 °C, including the genera Pyrobaculum, Pyrodictium, Pyrococcus, Thermus aquaticus and Melanopyrus.
- Psychrophiles, optimum growth temperature of less than 15 °C, including the genera Methanogenium and Halorubrum.
- Alkaliphiles, optimum growth pH of greater than 8, including the genus Natronomonas.
- Acidophiles, optimum growth pH of less than 3, including the genera Sulfolobus and Picrophilus.
- Piezophiles, (also known as barophiles), prefer high pressure up to 130 MPa, such as deep ocean environments, including the genera Methanococcus and Pyrococcus.
- Halophiles, grow optimally in high salt concentrations between 0.2 M and 5.2 M NaCl, including the genera Haloarcula, Haloferax, Halococcus.

Methanogens are a significant subset of archaea and include many extremophiles, but are also ubiquitous in wetland environments as well as the ruminant and hindgut of animals. This process utilizes hydrogen to reduce carbon dioxide into methane, releasing energy into the usable form of adenosine triphosphate. They are the only known organisms capable of producing methane. Under stressful environmental conditions that cause DNA damage, some species of archaea aggregate and transfer DNA between cells. The function of this transfer appears to be to replace damaged DNA sequence information in the recipient cell by undamaged sequence information from the donor cell.

== Eukaryotes ==
Eukaryotic cells contain membrane bound organelles. Some examples include mitochondria, a nucleus, or the Golgi apparatus. Prokaryotic cells probably transitioned into eukaryotic cells between 2.0 and 1.4 billion years ago. This was an important step in evolution. In contrast to prokaryotes, eukaryotes reproduce by using mitosis and meiosis. Sex appears to be a ubiquitous and ancient, and inherent attribute of eukaryotic life. Meiosis, a true sexual process, allows for efficient recombinational repair of DNA damage and a greater range of genetic diversity by combining the DNA of the parents followed by recombination. Metabolic functions in eukaryotes are more specialized as well by sectioning specific processes into organelles.

The endosymbiotic theory holds that mitochondria and chloroplasts have bacterial origins. Both organelles contain their own sets of DNA and have bacteria-like ribosomes. It is likely that modern mitochondria were once a species similar to Rickettsia, with the parasitic ability to enter a cell. However, if the bacteria were capable of respiration, it would have been beneficial for the larger cell to allow the parasite to live in return for energy and detoxification of oxygen. Chloroplasts probably became symbionts through a similar set of events, and are most likely descendants of cyanobacteria. While not all eukaryotes have mitochondria or chloroplasts, mitochondria are found in most eukaryotes, and chloroplasts are found in all plants and algae. Photosynthesis and respiration are essentially the reverse of one another, and the advent of respiration coupled with photosynthesis enabled much greater access to energy than fermentation alone.

=== Protozoa ===
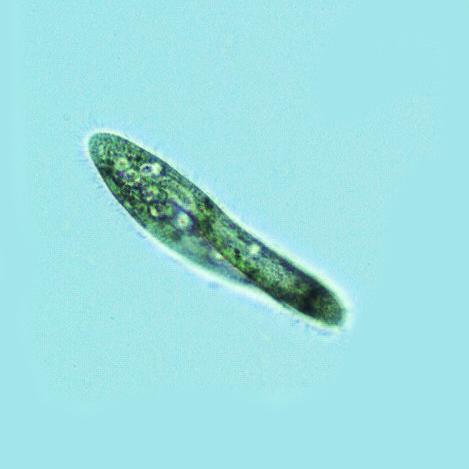
Paramecium tetraurelia, a ciliate, with oral groove visible

Protozoa are largely defined by their method of locomotion, including flagella, cilia, and pseudopodia. While there has been considerable debate on the classification of protozoa caused by their sheer diversity, in one system there are currently seven phyla recognized under the kingdom Protozoa: Euglenozoa, Amoebozoa, Choanozoa sensu Cavalier-Smith, Loukozoa, Percolozoa, Microsporidia and Sulcozoa. Protozoa, like plants and animals, can be considered heterotrophs or autotrophs. Autotrophs like Euglena are capable of producing their energy using photosynthesis, while heterotrophic protozoa consume food by either funneling it through a mouth-like gullet or engulfing it with pseudopods, a form of phagocytosis. While protozoa reproduce mainly asexually, some protozoa are capable of sexual reproduction. Protozoa with sexual capability include the pathogenic species Plasmodium falciparum, Toxoplasma gondii, Trypanosoma brucei, Giardia duodenalis and Leishmania species.

Ciliophora, or ciliates, are a group of protists that utilize cilia for locomotion. Examples include Paramecium, Stentors, and Vorticella. Ciliates are widely abundant in almost all environments where water can be found, and the cilia beat rhythmically in order to propel the organism. Many ciliates have trichocysts, which are spear-like organelles that can be discharged to catch prey, anchor themselves, or for defense. Ciliates are also capable of sexual reproduction, and utilize two nuclei unique to ciliates: a macronucleus for normal metabolic control and a separate micronucleus that undergoes meiosis. Examples of such ciliates are Paramecium and Tetrahymena that likely employ meiotic recombination for repairing DNA damage acquired under stressful conditions.

The Amebozoa utilize pseudopodia and cytoplasmic flow to move in their environment. Entamoeba histolytica is the cause of amebic dysentery. Entamoeba histolytica appears to be capable of meiosis.

=== Unicellular algae ===
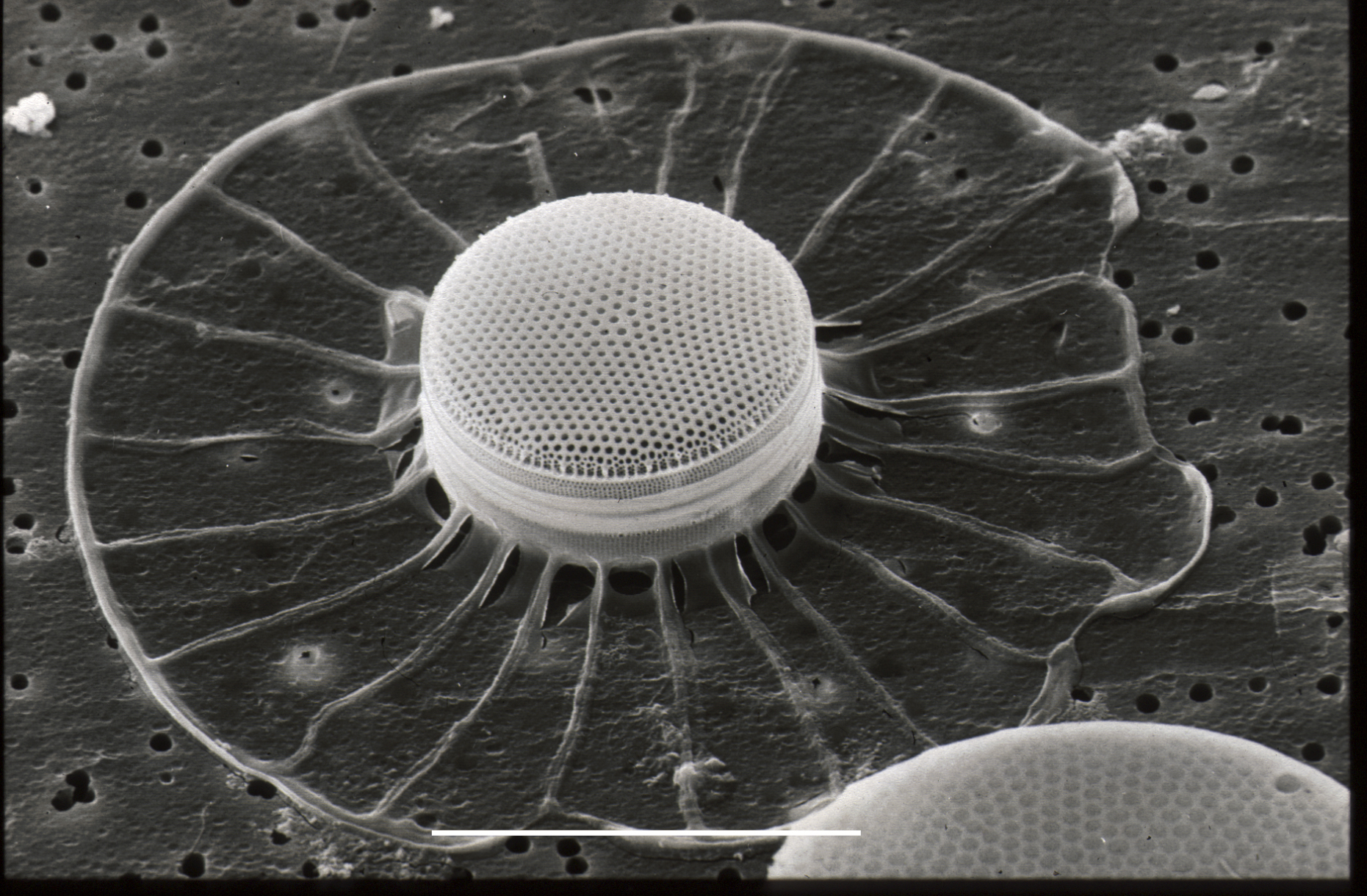
A scanning electron microscope image of a diatom

Unicellular algae are plant-like autotrophs and contain chlorophyll. They include groups that have both multicellular and unicellular species:

- Euglenophyta, flagellated, mostly unicellular algae that occur often in fresh water. In contrast to most other algae, they lack cell walls and can be mixotrophic (both autotrophic and heterotrophic). An example is Euglena gracilis.
- Chlorophyta (green algae), mostly unicellular algae found in fresh water. The chlorophyta are of particular importance because they are believed to be most closely related to the evolution of land plants.
- Diatoms, unicellular algae that have siliceous cell walls. They are the most abundant form of algae in the ocean, although they can be found in fresh water as well. They account for about 40% of the world's primary marine production, and produce about 25% of the world's oxygen. Diatoms are very diverse, and comprise about 100,000 species.
- Dinoflagellates, unicellular flagellated algae, with some that are armored with cellulose. Dinoflagellates can be mixotrophic, and are the algae responsible for red tide. Some dinoflagellates, like Pyrocystis fusiformis, are capable of bioluminescence.

=== Unicellular fungi ===
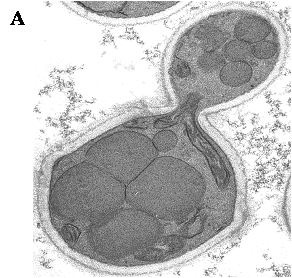
Transmission electron microscope image of budding Ogataea polymorpha

Unicellular fungi include the yeasts. Fungi are found in most habitats, although most are found on land. Yeasts reproduce through mitosis, and many use a process called budding, where most of the cytoplasm is held by the mother cell. Saccharomyces cerevisiae ferments carbohydrates into carbon dioxide and alcohol, and is used in the making of beer and bread. S. cerevisiae is also an important model organism, since it is a eukaryotic organism that is easy to grow. It has been used to research cancer and neurodegenerative diseases as well as to understand the cell cycle. Furthermore, research using S. cerevisiae has played a central role in understanding the mechanism of meiotic recombination and the adaptive function of meiosis. Candida spp. are responsible for candidiasis, causing infections of the mouth and/or throat (known as thrush) and vagina (commonly called yeast infection).

=== Unicellular animals ===
Some parasitic cnidarians in the clade myxozoa experience unicellular life phases. The feeding stage of these organisms is a superficially worm-like unicellular plasmodium; within these cells, multicellular spores develop. The group experiences alternation of generations and is not truly unicellular.

== Macroscopic unicellular organisms ==
Most unicellular organisms are of microscopic size and are thus classified as microorganisms. However, some unicellular protists and bacteria are macroscopic and visible to the naked eye. Examples include:

- Brefeldia maxima, a slime mold, examples have been reported up to a centimetre thick with a surface area of over a square metre and weighed up to around 20 kg
- Xenophyophores, protozoans of the phylum Foraminifera, are the largest examples known, with Syringammina fragilissima achieving a diameter of up to 20 cm (7.9 in)
- Nummulites, foraminiferans
- Valonia ventricosa, an alga of the class Chlorophyceae, can reach a diameter of 1 to 4 cm (0.4 to 2 in)
- Acetabularia, algae
- Caulerpa, algae, may grow to 3 metres long
- Gromia sphaerica, amoeba, 5 to 38 mm (0.2 to 1 in)
- Thiomargarita magnifica is the largest bacterium, reaching a length of up to 20 mm
- Epulopiscium fishelsoni, a bacterium
- Stentor, ciliates nicknamed trumpet animalcules
- Bursaria, largest colpodean ciliates.

== See also ==
- Abiogenesis
- Asexual reproduction
- Colonial organism
- Individuality in biology
- Largest organisms
- Modularity in biology
- Multicellular organism
- Sexual reproduction
- Superorganism
