= Stentor amethystinus =

Scientific classification
- Domain: Eukaryota
- Supergroup: Alveolata
- Phylum: Ciliophora
- Class: Heterotrichea
- Order: Heterotrichida
- Family: Stentoridae
- Genus: Stentor
- Species: S. amethystinus

Binomial name
- Stentor amethystinus Leidy, 1880

Species of single-celled organism

Stentor amethystinus is a single-celled eukaryote. It is often 0.5 millimetres (0.02 in) long and is found in freshwater ponds and lakes. Algae live in symbiosis with Stentor amethystinus, providing food for the ciliate, which then protects the algae. Unlike many of its relatives, Stentor amethystinus is red-violet in color, due to the chemical amethystin. The chemical amethystin is structurally similar to the chemical stentorin, which belongs to Stentor coeruleus. Stentor amethystinus tends to be more pyriform in shape, not stretching out like its relatives Stentor coeruleus. It has one large circular macronucleus in the cell, unlike the moniliform macronucleus found in some of its relatives. It also has many micronuclei, somewhere around the 20 mark, each being pigmented.
