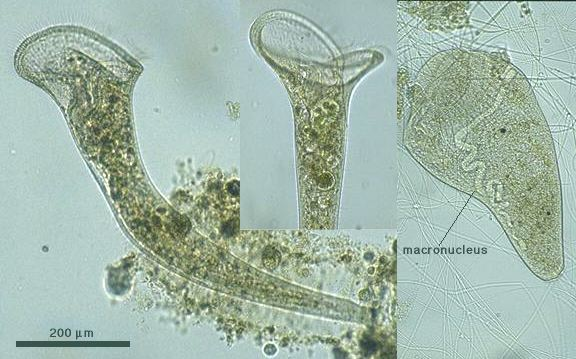
- Stentor roeselii

Scientific classification
- Domain: Eukaryota
- Clade: Sar
- Clade: Alveolata
- Phylum: Ciliophora
- Class: Heterotrichea
- Order: Heterotrichida
- Family: Stentoridae
- Genus: Stentor
- Species: S. roeselii

Binomial name
- Stentor roeselii Ehrenberg 1835

= Stentor roeselii =

Species of single-celled organism

Stentor roeselii is a free-living ciliate species of the genus Stentor, in the class Heterotrichea. It is a common and widespread protozoan, found throughout the world in freshwater ponds, lakes, rivers and ditches.

== Appearance and Characteristics ==
S. roeselii is found in still or slow-moving bodies of water, where it feeds on bacteria, flagellates, algae, and other ciliates. When feeding, the cell is fixed in place (sessile), attached by a posterior "holdfast" organelle to a firm surface such as plant stem or submerged detritus. Attached specimens are trumpet-shaped, and very contractile. When swimming freely, cells are compactly ovoid. Fully stretched out specimens are usually between 500 and 1200 micrometres in length, but size is extremely variable.

It is a colourless species, with no pigmentation in the cell cortex. The body of the organism is covered with 40-80 longitudinal rows of cilia, and the oral region is encircled by a long spiraling row of specialized ciliary structures called membranelles which are mainly used for brushing prey into the cell mouth (cytostome). The cytoplasm is transparent, and contains no symbiotic algae (zoochlorellae). When the organism is fully extended, its macronucleus is long and worm-like. In contraction, the macronucleus may show distinct nodules separated by constricted areas, giving it the appearance of a string of beads. Cells have a single contractile vacuole, located to the left of the cell mouth (cytostome).

The tail end of feeding organisms may be surrounded by a loose, mucilaginous lorica filled with debris and excreted matter. The presence or absence of this lorica is not considered a diagnostic character of the genus.

Although only a single-celled ciliate, Stentor roeselii expresses a sort of "behavioral hierarchy" and can 'change its mind' if its response to an irritant does not relieve the irritant, implying a very speculative sense of 'cognition'.
