= Microscopic scale =

Objects too small to be seen unaided

The microscopic scale (from Ancient Greek μικρός (mikrós) 'small' and σκοπέω (skopéō) 'to look (at); examine, inspect') is the scale of objects and events smaller than those that can easily be seen by the naked eye, requiring a lens or microscope to see them clearly. In physics, the microscopic scale is sometimes regarded as the scale between the macroscopic scale and the quantum scale. Microscopic units and measurements are used to classify and describe very small objects. One common microscopic length scale unit is the micrometre (also called a micron) (symbol: μm), which is one millionth of a metre.

== History ==
Whilst compound microscopes were first developed in the 1590s, the significance of the microscopic scale was only truly established in the 1600s when Marcello Malphigi and Antonie van Leeuwenhoek microscopically observed frog lungs and microorganisms. As microbiology was established, the significance of making scientific observations at a microscopic level increased.

Published in 1665, Robert Hooke's book Micrographia details his microscopic observations including fossils insects, sponges, and plants, which was possible through his development of the compound microscope. During his studies of cork, he discovered plant cells and coined the term 'cell'.

Prior to the use of the micro- prefix, other terms were originally incorporated into the International metric system in 1795, such as centi- which represented a factor of 10^{−2}, and milli-, which represented a factor of 10^{−3}.

Over time the importance of measurements made at the microscopic scale grew, and an instrument named the Millionometre was developed by watch-making company owner Antoine LeCoultre in 1844. This instrument had the ability to precisely measure objects to the nearest micrometre.

The British Association for the Advancement of Science committee incorporated the micro- prefix into the newly established CGS system in 1873.

The micro- prefix was finally added to the official SI system in 1960, acknowledging measurements that were made at an even smaller level, denoting a factor of 10^{−6}.

== Biology ==
By convention, the microscopic scale also includes classes of objects that are most commonly too small to see but of which some members are large enough to be observed with the eye. Such groups include the Cladocera, planktonic green algae of which Volvox is readily observable, and the protozoa of which Stentor can be easily seen without aid. The submicroscopic scale similarly includes objects that are too small to see with an optical microscope.

== Thermodynamics ==
In thermodynamics and statistical mechanics, the microscopic scale is the scale at which we do not measure or directly observe the precise state of a thermodynamic system – such detailed states of a system are called microstates. We instead measure thermodynamic variables at a macroscopic scale, i.e. the macrostate.

== Levels of microscopic scale ==
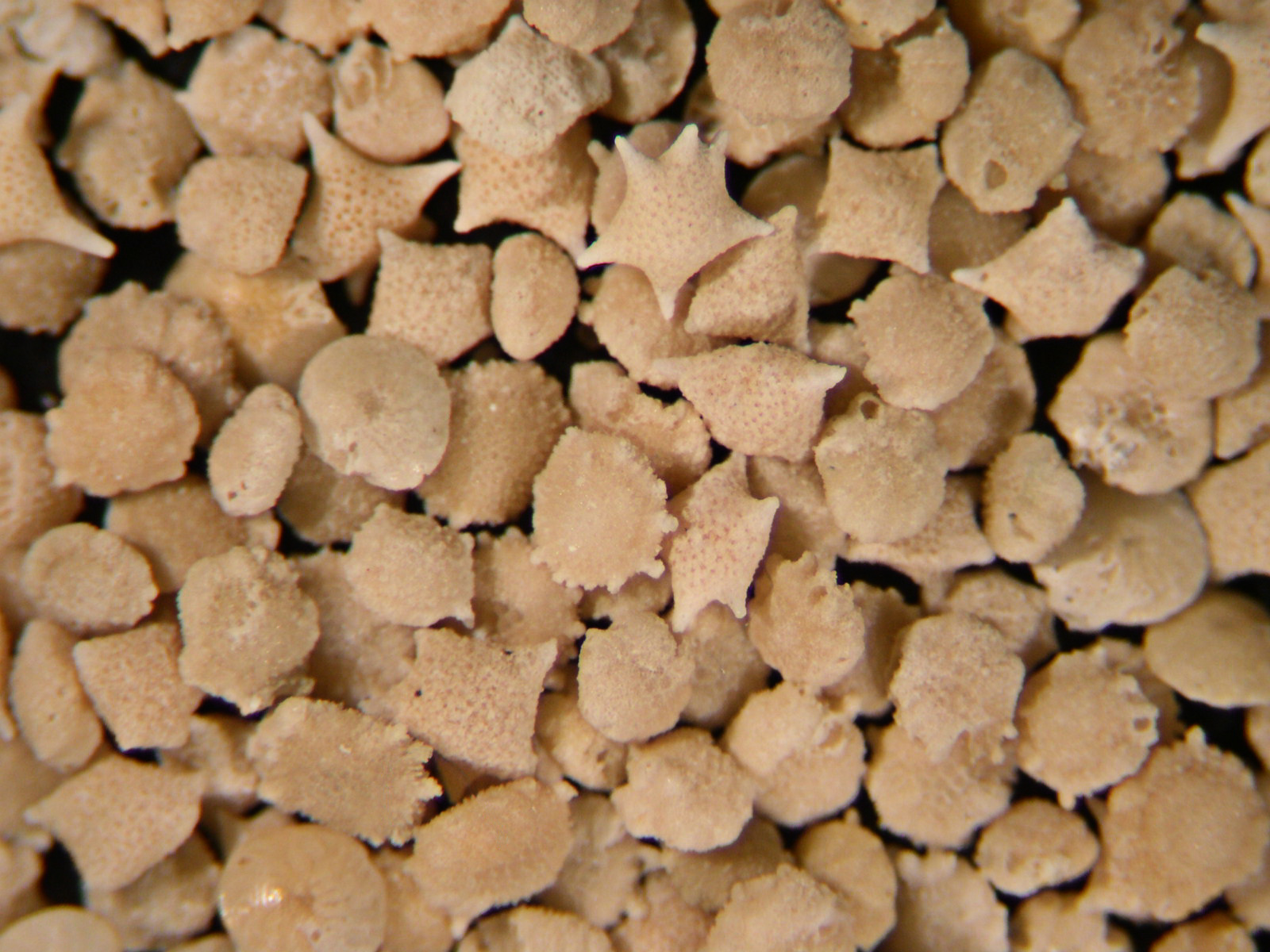
Cay foraminifera sand from Warraber Island Torres Strait, under a light microscope. The shape and texture in each individual grain is made visible through the microscope.

As the microscopic scale covers any object that cannot be seen by the naked eye, yet is visible under a microscope, the range of objects that fall under this scale can be as small as an atom, visible underneath a transmission electron microscope. Microscope types are often distinguished by their mechanism and application, and can be divided into two general categories.

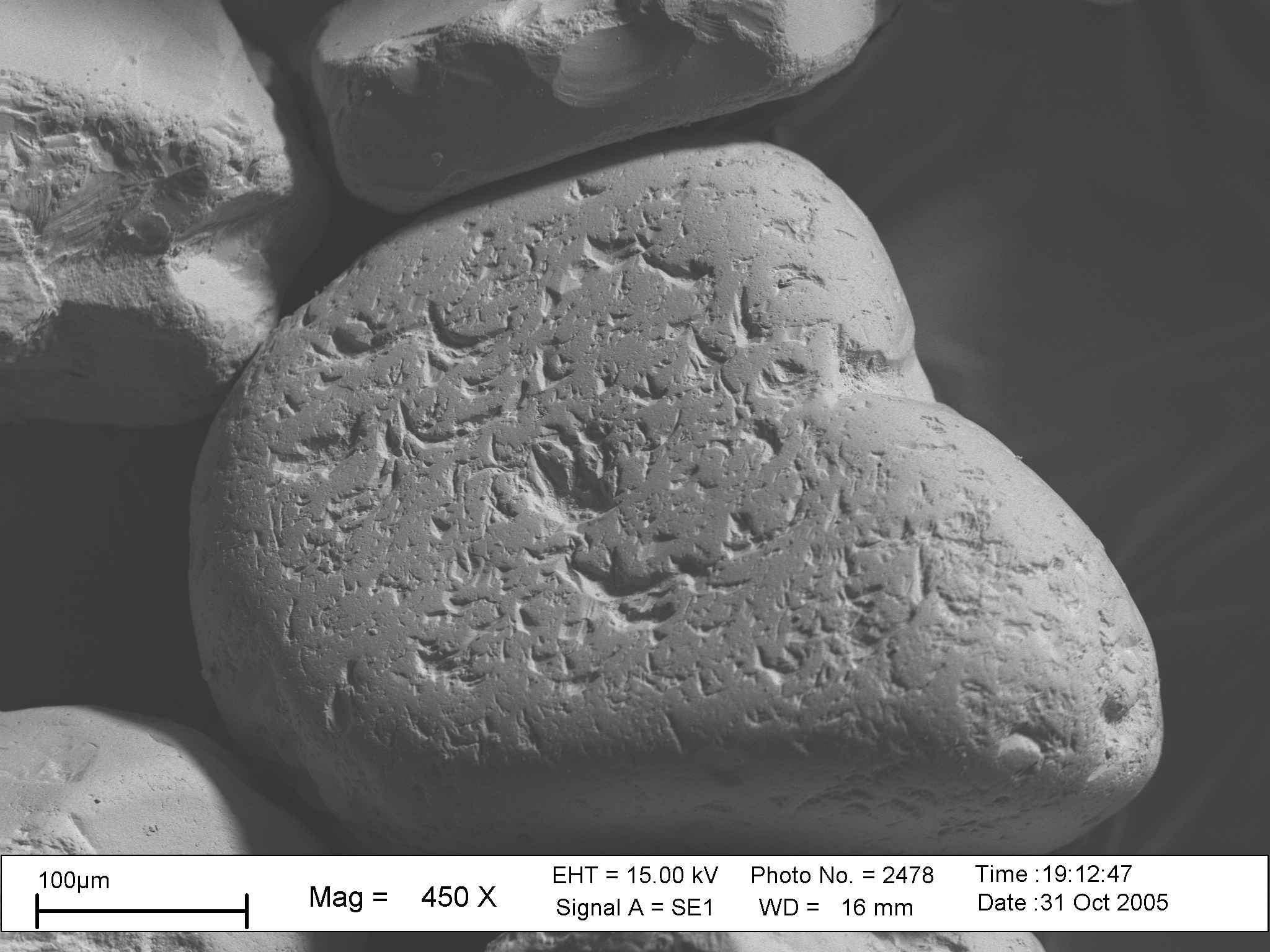
The impact marks and features on this single grain of sand can be clearly viewed through an electron microscope.

=== Light microscopes ===
Amongst optical microscopes, the utilised objective lens dictates how small of an object can be seen. These varying objective lenses can change the resolving power of the microscope, which determines the shortest distance that somebody is able to distinguish two separate objects through that microscope lens. The resolution between two objects varies from individual to individual, but the strength of the objective lenses can be quantified.

In the 1660s, Antonie van Leeuwenhoek devised a simple microscope utilising a single spherical lens mounted between two thin brass plates. Depending on the quality of the lens, magnifications of between 70x and 250x were possible. The specimen to be examined was mounted on a point on a finely threaded rod.

Compound light microscopes have a short focal length objective lens which produces a real image which is examined using a longer focal length eyepiece. The ratio of the focal length of the objective and the eyepiece, when mounted in a standard tube length, gives an approximate magnification of the system. Due to their design, compound microscopes have improved resolving power and contrast in comparison to simple microscopes, and can be used to view the structure, shape and motility of a cell and its organisms, which can be as small as 0.1 micrometres.

=== Electron microscopes ===
While electron microscopes are still a form of compound microscope, their use of electron beams to illuminate objects varies in mechanism significantly from compound light microscopes, allowing them to have a much higher resolving power, and magnification approximately 10,000 times more than light microscopes. These can be used to view objects such as atoms, which are as small as 0.001 micrometres.

== Uses ==
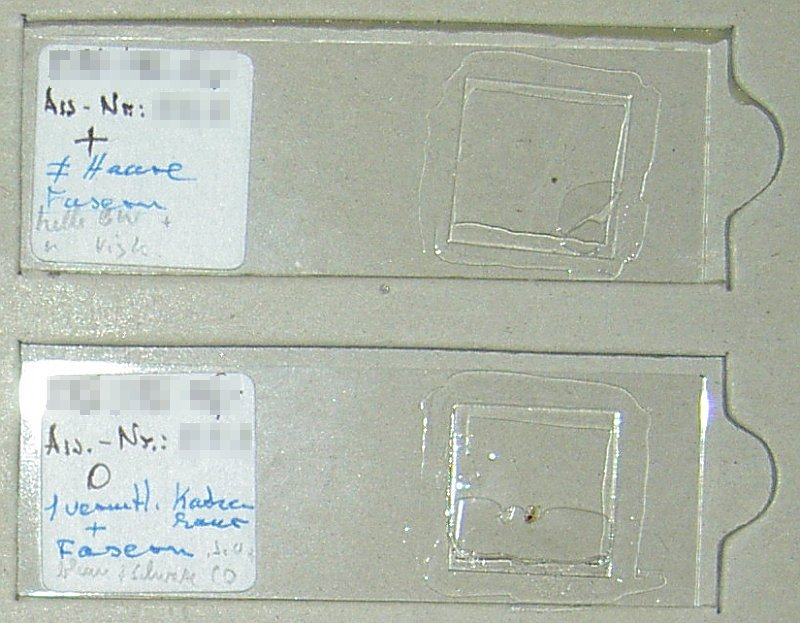
Slides with preserved pieces of hair under the coverslip. These samples were microscopically analysed for their condition, followed by DNA analysis, as a part of an animal forensics investigation.

=== Forensics ===
During forensic investigations, trace evidence from crime scenes such as blood, fingerprints and fibres can be closely examined under microscopes, even to the extent of determining the age of a trace. Along with other specimens, biological traces can be used to accurately identify individuals present at a location, down to cells found in their blood.

=== Gemology ===
When the monetary value of gems is determined, various professions in gemology require systematic observation of the microscopic physical and optical properties of gemstones. This can involve the use of stereo microscopes to evaluate these qualities, to eventually determine the value of each individual jewel or gemstone. This can be done similarly in evaluations of gold and other metals.

=== Infrastructure ===
When assessing road materials, the microscopic composition of the infrastructure is vital in determining the longevity and safety of the road, and the different requirements of varying locations. As chemical properties such as water permeability, structural stability and heat resistance affect the performance of different materials used in pavement mixes, they are taken into consideration when building for roads according to the traffic, weather, supply and budget in that area.

=== Medicine ===
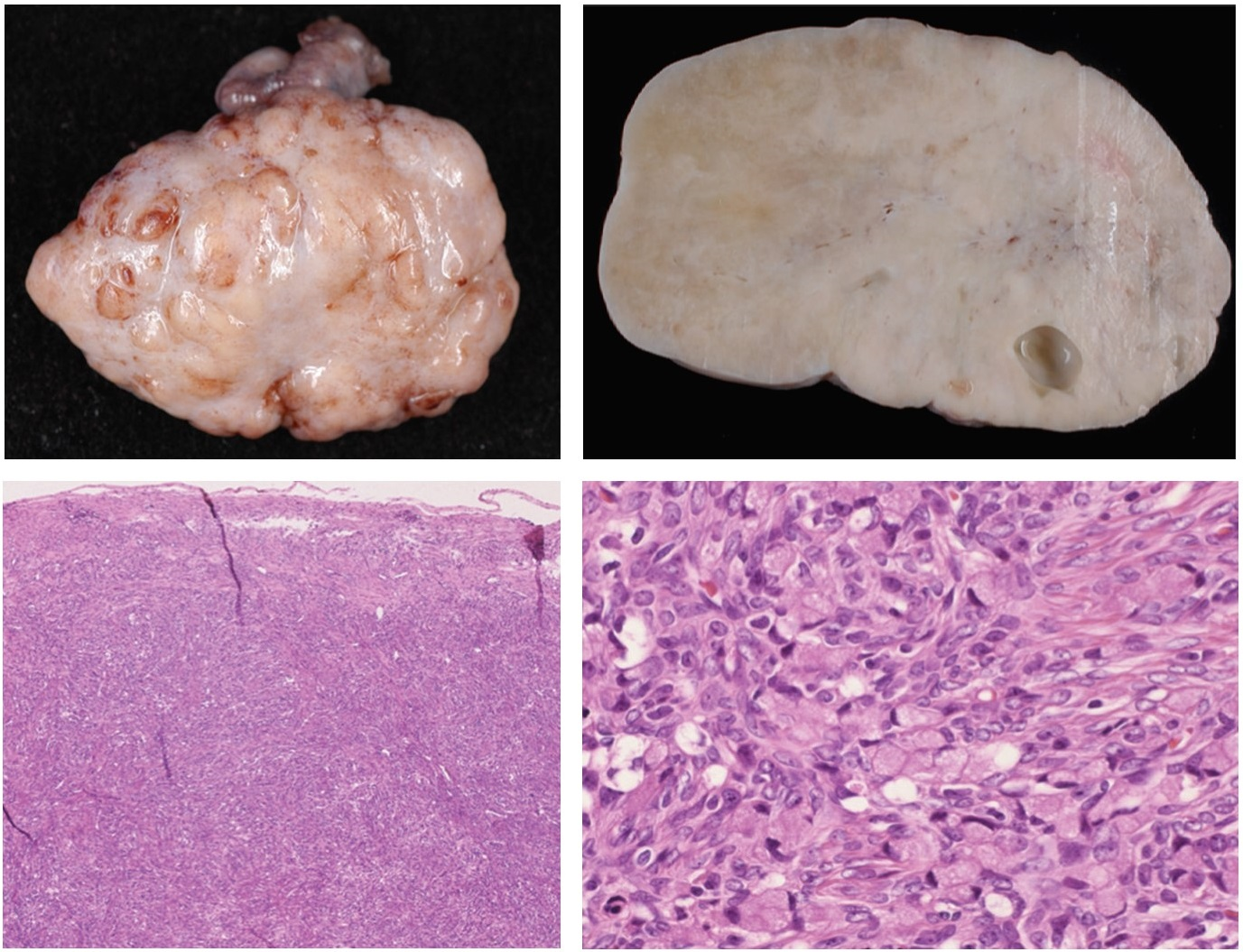
A sample can be cross-sectioned from these ovary Krukenberg tumours to microscopically observe their histopathological appearance. Under the different magnification levels, a microscope can zoom in on the invasive proliferation of signet-ring cells with a desmoplastic stroma.

In medicine, diagnoses can be made with the assistance of microscopic observation of patient biopsies, such as cancer cells. Pathology and cytology reports include a microscopic description, which consists of analyses performed using microscopes, histochemical stains or flow cytometry. These methods can determine the structure of the diseased tissue and the severity of the disease, and early detection is possible through identification of microscopic indications of illness.

== Microscopic scale in the laboratory ==
Whilst use of the microscopic scale has many roles and purposes in the scientific field, there are many biochemical patterns observed microscopically that have contributed significantly to the understanding of how human life relies on microscopic structures to function and live.

=== Founding experiments ===
Antonie van Leeuwenhoek was not only a contributor to the invention of the microscope, he is also referred to as the "father of Microbiology". This is due to his significant contributions in the initial observation and documentation of unicellular organisms such as bacteria and spermatozoa, and microscopic human tissue such as muscle fibres and capillaries.

=== Biochemistry ===
==== Human cells ====
Genetic manipulation of energy-regulating mitochondria under microscopic principles has also been found to extend organism lifespan, tackling age-associated issues in humans such as Parkinson's, Alzheimer's and multiple sclerosis. By increasing the amount of energy products made by mitochondria, the lifespan of its cell, and thus organism, increases.

==== DNA ====
Microscopic analysis of the spatial distribution of points within DNA heterochromatin centromeres emphasise the role of the centromeric regions of chromosomes in nuclei undergoing the interphase part of cell mitosis. Such microscopic observations suggest nonrandom distribution and precise structure of centromeres during mitosis is a vital contributor to successful cell function and growth, even in cancer cells.

=== Chemistry and physics ===
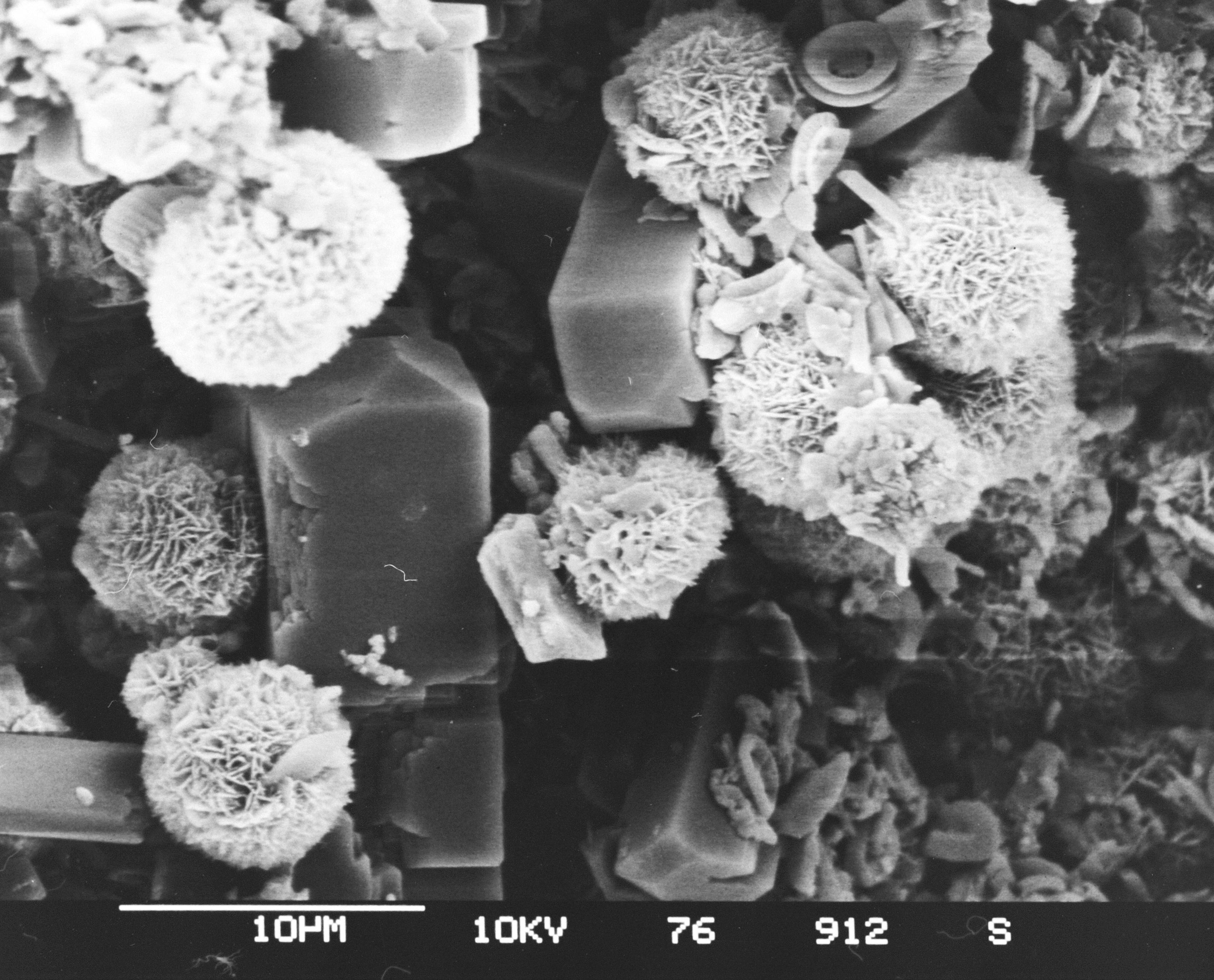
Photomicrograph of Arnager Kalk ("Arnager Limestone"), taken with a Scanning Electron Microscope. From the Upper Cretaceous of Bornholm, Denmark: a microscopic view of prismatic crystals and spheroidal aggregates of unidentified authigenic minerals.

The entropy and disorder of the universe can be observed at a microscopic scale, with reference to the second and third law of thermodynamics. In some cases, this can involve calculating the entropy change within a container of expanding gas molecules and relating it to the entropy change of its environment and the universe.

=== Ecology ===
Ecologists monitor the state of an ecosystem over time by identifying microscopic features within the environment. This includes the temperature and CO_{2} tolerance of microorganisms such as ciliates, and their interactions with othrt Protozoa. Additionally, microscopic factors such as movement and motility can be observed in water samples of that ecosystem.

=== Geology ===
Branches of geology involve the study of the Earth's structure at a microscopic level. Physical characteristics of rocks are recorded, and in petrography there is a specific focus on the examination of microscopic details of rocks. Similar to scanning electron microscopes, electron microprobes can be used in petrology to observe the condition that allows rocks to form, which can inform the origin of these samples. In structural geology, petrographic microscopes allow the study of rock microstructures, to determine how geologic features such as tectonic plates affect the likelihood of earthquakes and groundwater movement.

== Current research ==
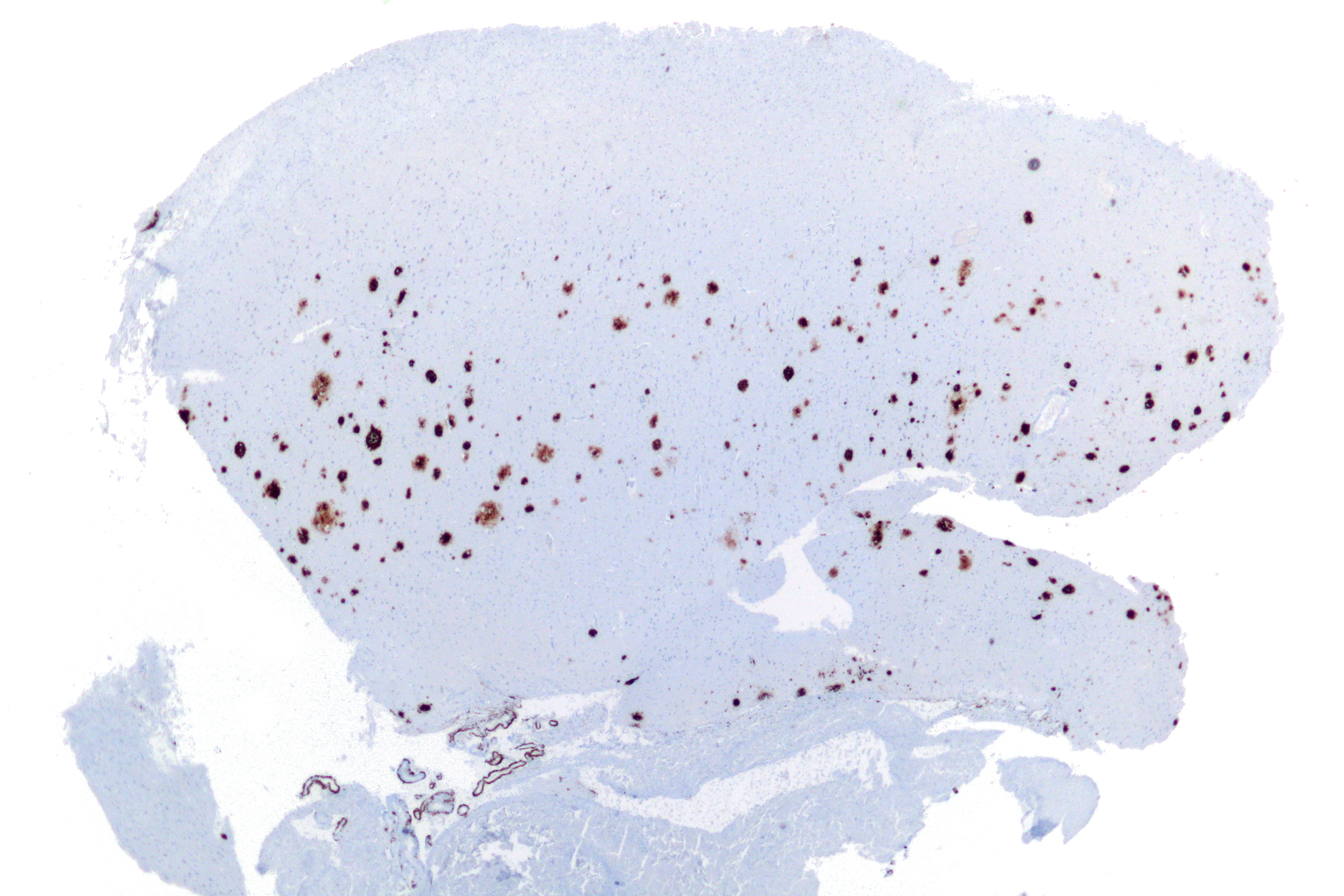
A low magnification microscopic view of cerebral amyloid angiopathy, with brown-stained senile plaque visible in the cerebral cortex, characteristic of Alzheimer's Disease.

There have been both advances in microscopic technology, and discoveries in other areas of knowledge as a result of microscopic technology.

=== Alzheimer's and Parkinson's disease ===
In conjunction with fluorescent tagging, molecular details in singular amyloid proteins can be studied through new light microscopy techniques, and their relation to Alzheimer's and Parkinson's disease.

=== Atomic force microscopy ===
Other improvements in light microscopy include the ability to view sub-wavelength, nanosized objects. Nanoscale imaging via atomic force microscopy has also been improved to allow a more precise observation of small amounts of complex objects, such as cell membranes.

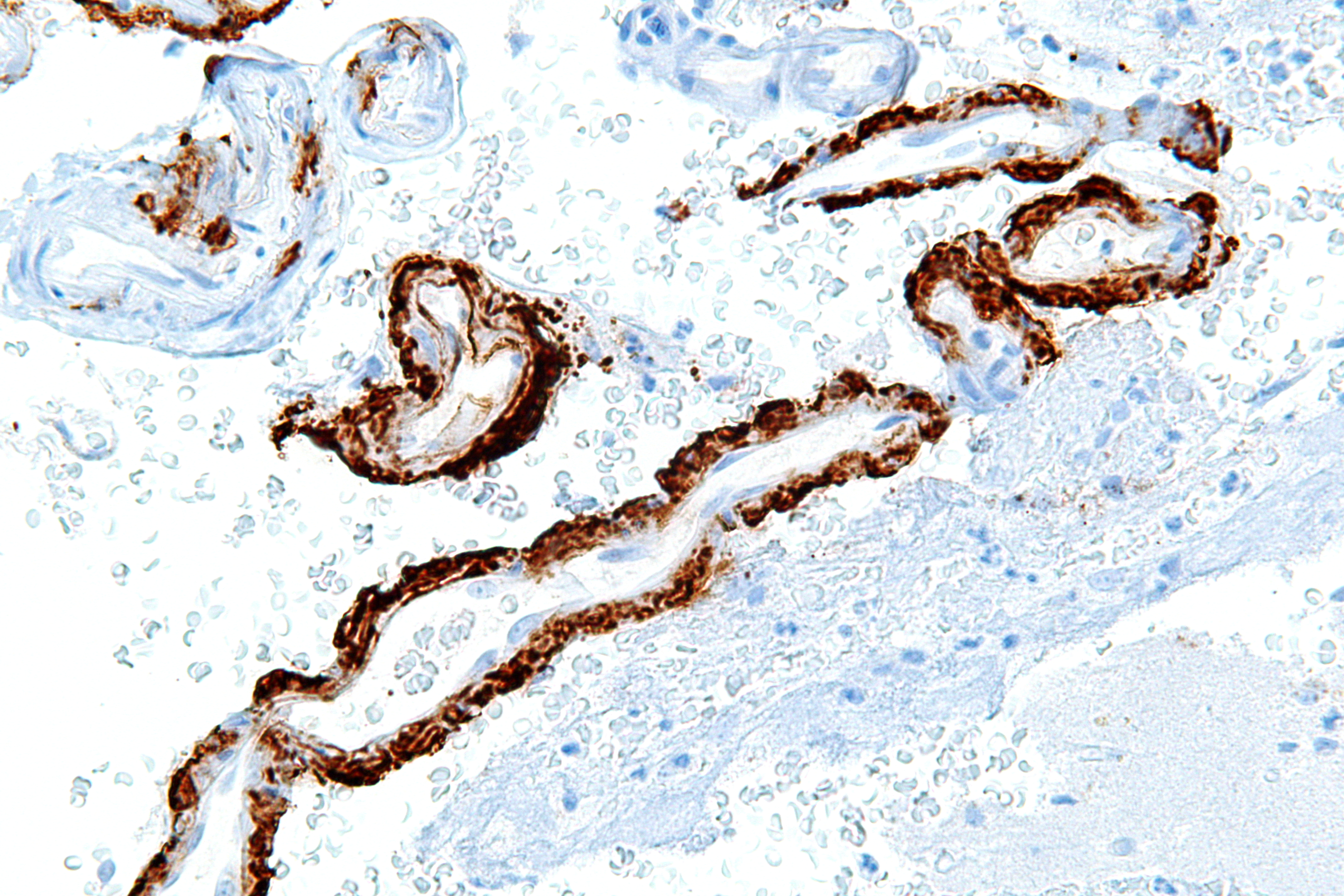
A very high magnification microscopic view of the exact same slide, zooming in on the brown staining caused by amyloid beta in senile plaques, contributing to symptoms of Alzheimer's disease.

=== Renewable energy ===
Coherent microscopic patterns discovered in chemical systems support ideas of the resilience of certain substances against entropic environments. This research is being utilised to inform the productions of solar fuels, and the improvement of renewable energy.

=== Microscopic musical instrument - Micronium ===
A microscopic musical instrument called the Micronium has also been developed through micromechanics, consisting of springs the thickness of human hair being plucked by microscopic comb drives. This is a very minimal movement that produces an audible noise to the human ear, which was not previously done by past attempts with microscopic instruments.

== See also ==
- Macroscopic scale
- Microorganism
- Van Leeuwenhoek's microscopes
- Van Leeuwenhoek's microscopic discovery of microbial life (microorganisms)
