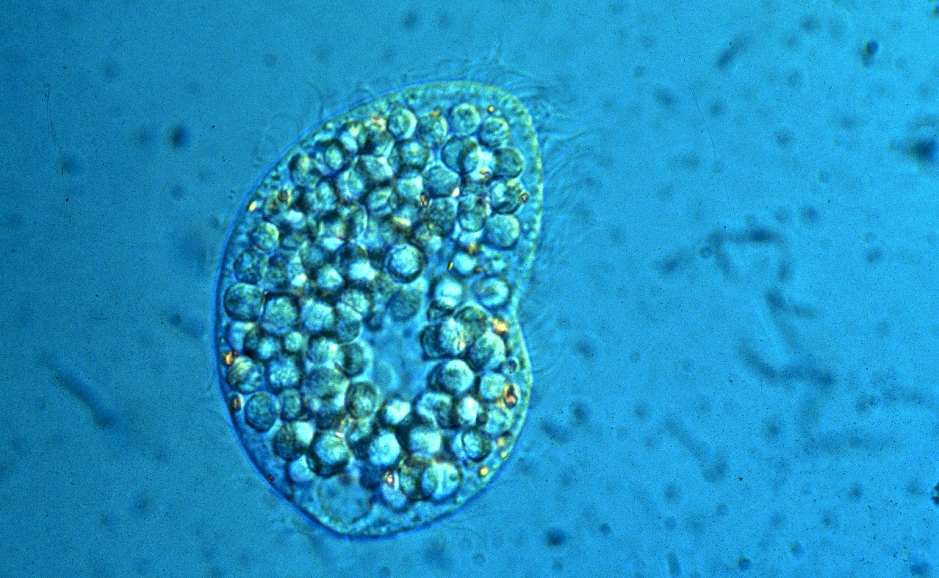
- Colpoda inflata

Scientific classification
- Domain: Eukaryota
- Clade: Sar
- Clade: Alveolata
- Phylum: Ciliophora
- Class: Colpodea
- Order: Colpodida
- Family: Colpodidae
- Genus: Colpoda; O. F. Müller, 1773

Species
- Colpoda aspera Kahl, 1926; Colpoda cucullus O.F. Müller, 1786; Colpoda steinii Maupas, 1883

= Colpoda =

Genus of single-celled organisms

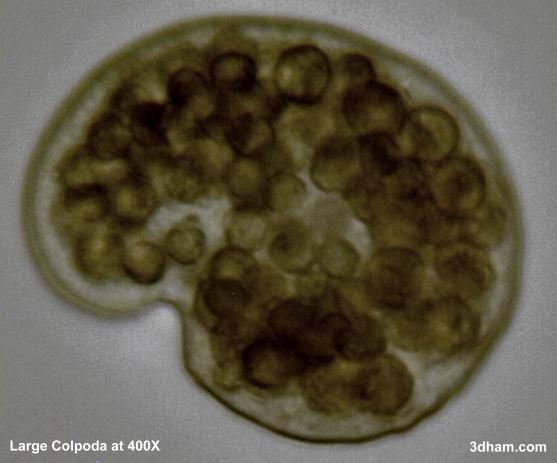
Typical large Colpoda @ 400X

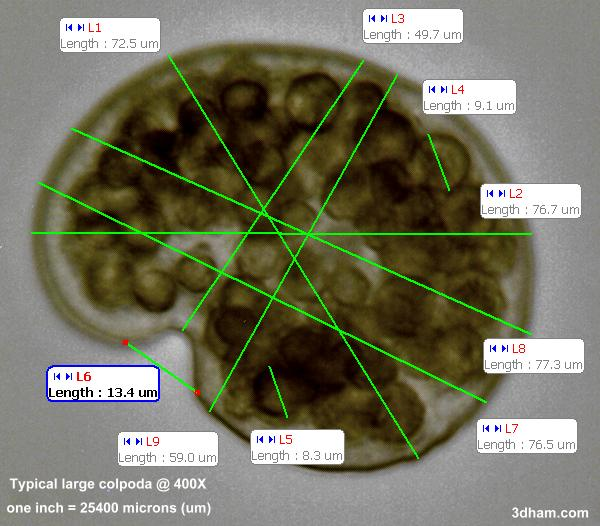
Measurements of large Colpoda in micrometres

Colpoda is a genus of ciliates in the class Colpodea, order Colpodida, and family Colpodidae.

== Description ==
Colpoda are distinctly reniform (kidney-shaped) and are strongly convex on one side, and concave on the other. The concave side often looks like a bite was taken out of it. Although they are not as well known as the paramecium, they are often the first protozoa to appear in hay infusions, especially when the sample does not come from an existing mature source of standing water.

== Habitat ==
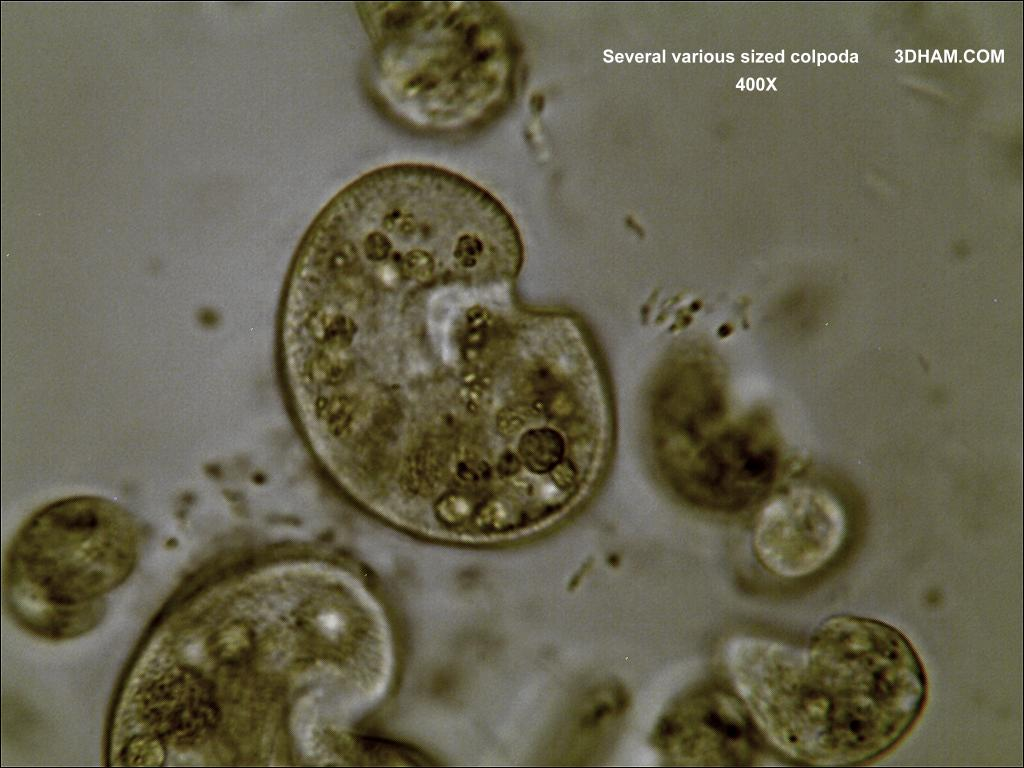
More detailed image of various sized Colpoda at 400X

Colpoda are often found in moist soil and because of their ability to readily enter protective cysts will quite frequently be found in desiccated samples of soil and vegetation as well as in temporary natural pools such as tree holes. They have also been found in the intestines of various animals, and can be cultured from their droppings.

Colpoda cucullus has been found inhabiting the surface of plants and seems to dominate the microfauna there. Several species of Colpoda have been found in the pitcher plant Sarracenia purpurea, despite the presence of protease digestive enzymes in the liquid.

Colpoda also tends to be found in abundance where increased levels of bacteria offer an enriched food source. In commercial chicken houses, for example, they seemed to be ubiquitous but the species found vary widely from one location to the next, suggesting that these populations represent local soil and aquatic populations which migrated into the new habitat.

In addition to inhabiting a wide variety of microclimates, Colpoda can be found almost everywhere around the world where there is standing water or moist soil, even where these conditions are only ephemeral. Colpoda brasiliensis for example was discovered in Brazilian floodplains in 2003. Colpoda irregularis has been found in the high desert region of Southwest Idaho. Colpoda aspera has been found in the Antarctic. Colpoda are also found in the arctic where warmer temperatures and longer summers lead to greater density and species diversity.

Not only is the genus widespread, but there are also several species that have nearly global distribution, and, indeed, it has been suggested this may be true of all species, a fact that could be borne out by better investigation. Though Colpoda are not normally found in the marine environment, there are many ways they can travel from one continent to another. For example, cysts can become lodged in the plumage of migratory birds, becoming dislodged hundreds or even thousands of miles away. Also, because cysts are so small and light, they can be swept by air currents into the upper atmosphere, and then come down on another continent.

== Reproduction and conjugation ==
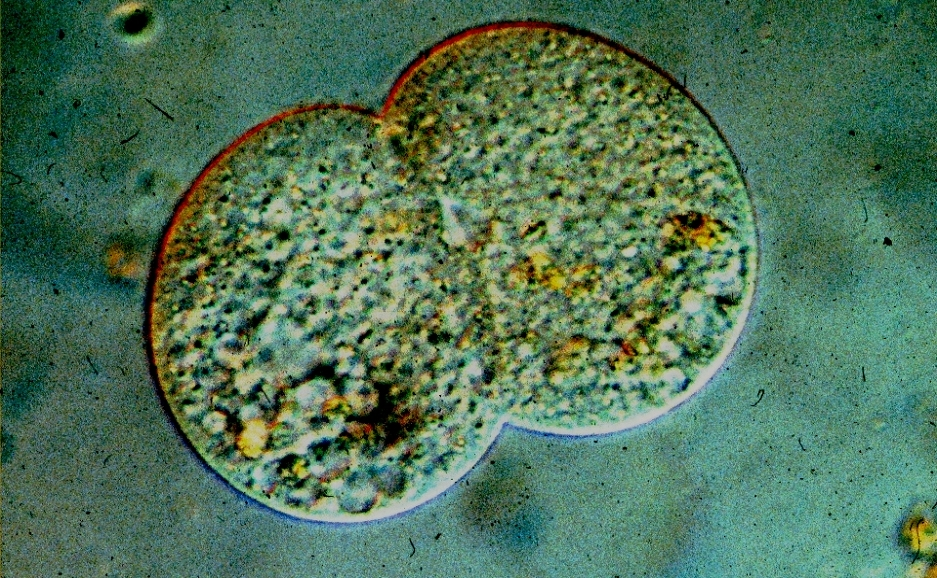
Colpoda conjugation

Colpoda normally divides into cysts, from which two to eight individuals emerge, four being the most common number. This produces genetically identical individuals. The rate at which such reproduction occurs and how it is affected by various environmental conditions has been the subject of a great deal of scientific research.

On rare occasions, Colpoda have been observed to divide into 4 individuals without producing a cyst wall. It has been suggested that cyst less reproduction was the normal mode of reproduction for Colpoda under optimum conditions and that the formation of cysts was a reaction to adverse environmental conditions. However, the knowledge gained by many years of culturing Colpoda in hay infusions has shown that this mode of reproduction remains rare despite what would seem to be ideal environmental conditions.

As in other ciliates, division in Colpoda may be preceded by a sexual phenomenon known as conjugation. This involves two Colpoda joining at the oral groove and exchanging DNA. Following conjugation, the Colpoda divides, redistributing the DNA of the two original cells to produce numerous genetically distinct offspring.

== Ecological role ==
Most Colpoda species are either primarily or exclusively bacterivores feeding on a wide variety of bacteria, which include Moraxella. Several scientific studies have been made on the effect of different bacterial diets on the rate of Colpoda reproduction. Much has been written on the ecological role that Colpoda fulfill in the soil.

In addition to their role as predators of bacteria, Colpoda are themselves prey to a large variety of species. This includes other protozoans as well as small animals such as mosquito larva, other insect larva, and waterfleas.

== Uses by humans ==
In addition to their use in education and in a wide variety of scientific studies, Colpoda have at times been suggested for more practical uses. Colpoda steinii has been suggested as a means to assess the toxicity of soil treated with sewage sludge and as a means to detect chemical contamination in general, possibly in the wake of a terrorist attack.

== Species ==
- Colpoda acuta - Found in central Europe, it was first described in a paper published in 1977.
- Colpoda aspera - A fairly small species, 12-42 micrometres, noted for being less reniform than other species. Found in Antarctic, Subantarctic.
- Colpoda brasiliensis - A small species, 18-33 micrometres, noted for its mineral envelope which acts as a passive defense against predators. Named for the country in which it was discovered.
- Colpoda californica
- Colpoda cavicola
- Colpoda cucullus - A fairly widespread species noted for being the dominant protozoan on the surface of plants.
- Colpoda discoidea
- Colpoda duodenaria - A small to medium-sized species, first described by Charles Vincent Taylor and Waldo Furgason and widely studied for the effects of various chemicals on its excystment process.
- Colpoda ecaudata
- Colpoda elliotti - A small species, 15-28 micrometres, noted as having been cultured from deer droppings.
- Colpoda eurystoma
- Colpoda fastigata
- Colpoda formisanoi
- Colpoda fragilis
- Colpoda henneguyi - Widespread medium to large species, 30-80 micrometres, noted for its habit of staying perfectly still for long periods of time, making it easy to photograph live.
- Colpoda inflata - Possibly one of the best known and most common species, noted for its fitful resting stage in which it jerks around in a tight circle, frustrating microscopists trying to photograph it live.
- Colpoda irregularis - This species is noted for a prominent post oral sac and was cultured from moss and soil crust from rocks near desert sagebrush of southwest Idaho.
- Colpoda lucida
- Colpoda magna - A large species, 120-400 micrometres long. Appears dark at lower powers because of dark structures near the contractile vacuole. Often completely packed with food vacuoles.
- Colpoda maupasi - Once thought to be a variety of Colpoda steinii, later recognized as a separate species. Classically it was believed to produce only reproductive cysts containing 8 offspring. One strain, however, the Bensonhurst strain, was found to also produce reproductive cysts containing 4 offspring.
- Colpoda ovinucleata
- Colpoda patella
- Colpoda penardi
- Colpoda praestans
- Colpoda quinquecirrata
- Colpoda reniformis
- Colpoda rotunda
- Colpoda simulans - A medium-sized Colpoda with the classic "bite taken out of it" Colpoda shape.
- Colpoda spiralis - A very unusual species with a large overhang that gives it an almost snail-like appearance. It was first found in Arizona and has since been reported in New Mexico and Nevada, with a possible sighting in Northern California.
- Colpoda steinii - A widely distributed small to mid-sized species, 14-60 micrometres, usually free living but capable of being parasitic to land slugs.
- Colpoda tripartita
- Colpoda variabili

== Videos ==
Click on images before playing them to see full size (reload (F5) if you already hit play)

several dozen various sized Colpoda representing at least 3 species with other ciliates 100X

Large Colpoda amongst many smaller ones with other ciliates 100X

Detailed video of Colpoda in resting stage 400X

Another view of Colpoda in resting stage, showing relative sizes 400X

Unusual Colpoda, possibly Colpoda spiralis 400X

Unusual Colpoda, possibly Colpoda spiralis From when it was first spotted.

Several colpoda, seemingly stuck to debris 100X

Active Colpoda seems to harass a resting Colpoda Magnified 400 times
