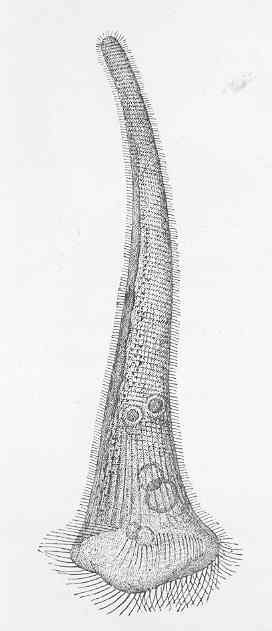

Scientific classification
- Domain: Eukaryota
- Supergroup: Alveolata
- Phylum: Ciliophora
- Class: Heterotrichea
- Order: Heterotrichida
- Family: Stentoridae
- Genus: Stentor
- Species: S. muelleri

Binomial name
- Stentor muelleri (Bory St. Vincent, 1824) Ehrenberg, 1838

Synonyms
- Stentor mulleri

= Stentor muelleri =

Species of single-celled organism

Stentor muelleri, also called a trumpet ciliate, is a single-celled eukaryote which feeds on algae. It has a horned-shaped body and is usually 0.5–1.0 millimetre (0.02–0.04 in) long (exceptionally up to 3 mm or 0.12 in) and is found in freshwater bodies of water and sometimes estuaries. Stentor muelleri is a heterotrich.
