= Stentor (disambiguation) =

Stentor is a figure from Greek mythology.

Stentor can also refer to:

- Stentor Alliance, alliance of telecommunications companies in Canada
- Stentor, genus of large, unicellular, ciliate protozoa
- 2146 Stentor, an asteroid
- Armstrong Siddeley Stentor, liquid-fuelled rocket engine used in the Blue Steel missile
- STENTOR (satellite), a French communications satellite
- Les Stentors, a French vocal music group
- De Stentor, a Dutch newspaper
- USS Stentor, a US Navy ship
- Stentor (1814 ship), a British merchant ship
- The Stentor, Lake Forest College's student newspaper since 1887

== Others ==
- a newsreader for the 19th century Austro-Hungarian Telefon Hírmondó (telephone news service), who would need a loud voice to communicate over unamplified signals.
- Stentor, a PACS in the US Health industry.
- Stentor has also been used in organs for a type of very loud flue stop, and for a department of such stops as in the "Stentor Division" in the Wanamaker Organ.
