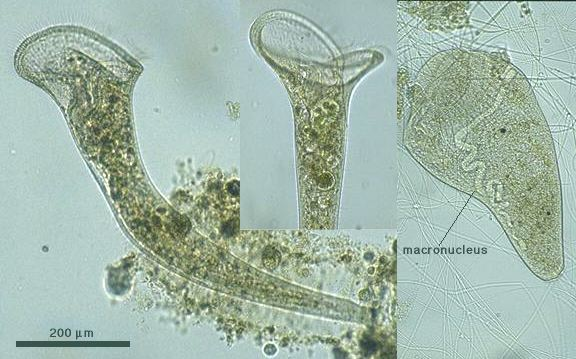
- Stentor roeselii

Scientific classification
- Domain: Eukaryota
- Supergroup: Alveolata
- Phylum: Ciliophora
- Class: Heterotrichea
- Order: Heterotrichida
- Family: Stentoridae; Carus, 1863
- Genus: Stentor; Oken, 1815

Species
- Stentor amethystinus; Stentor araucanus; Stentor baicalius (syn. Stentor pygmaeus); Stentor barretti; Stentor caudatus; Stentor coeruleus; Stentor cornutus; Stentor elegans; Stentor fuliginosus; Stentor igneus; Stentor introversus; Stentor katashimai; Stentor loricatus; Stentor magnus; Stentor muelleri (syn. Stentor felici); Stentor multiformis (syn. Stentor gallinulus, =Stentor nanus); Stentor multimicronucleatus; Stentor niger; Stentor polymorphus (syn. Stentor pediculatus); Stentor pyriformis; Stentor roeselii

= Stentor (ciliate) =

Genus of single-celled organisms

Stentor (previously known as "trumpet animalcules") is a genus of trumpet-shaped, ciliated protists common to most of the world. This group has been thoroughly studied by a small collection of dedicated micro-zoologists since the late 1800s, with multiple revisions occurring among their taxa since.

Members of this genus all share the same general morphology of a wide anterior feeding end and a tapered posterior tail end where they commonly adhere themselves to substrate. They are very large cells, ranging from approximately 0.4 to 2 millimeters (although this varies with species). They also have very fine control over their large bodies and can squeeze into a ball one-sixth of their total size or extend upward, widening their anterior feeding side. Species can have unique pigments due to the colouration of their ectoplasm's cortical granules and can organize distinct configurations of their large macronuclei.

They are heterotrophic and feed using their many cilia to create a water current, pulling prey into their large oral opening. Many species of this genus also have endosymbiotic algae, allowing them to gain nutrients from both prey and sunlight. They are most found in freshwater habitats, but certain species can be found in marine or even terrestrial habitats.

Members of Stentor also have remarkable regenerative abilities. If even a small fraction of the cell remains it can regenerate into a whole organism. This ability has made them a notable point of study and could possibly contribute to understanding of large-scale animal healing.

== Etymology ==
The name Stentor is a reference to the trumpet like shape of the organism, specifically its widened "mouth" or oral apparatus. It is derived from a herald in Greek mythology, who used his booming voice to motivate the Greek soldiers in the Trojan war.

== Type species ==
S. muelleri was the first species described in detail as a member of the genus by Christian Gottfried Ehrenberg in 1831. It is found commonly in freshwater habitats and occasionally estuaries, dispersed around the world. It is characterized by its moniliform macronucleus (containing 10-20 macronuclear nodes) and unpigmented cortical granules. Despite lacking pigments like other species, S. muelleri is not colourless but appears brown due to the thickness of the cell. It is typically 0.5 to 2 millimeters in length but can rarely stretch up to 3 millimeters.

== Description ==
Stentor can grow up to two millimeters in length, large enough for individuals to be seen by the naked eye. This size combined with their highly motile nature gives Stentor a complex interconnected physiology. The surface of the cell is covered with a protective layer called the pellicle. This layer is secreted by the cell and can be shed and reformed if the organism is stressed.

=== Cortical granules ===
Under this pellicle are alternating raised granular lines and indented clear lines both running longitudinally. Granular lines increase in thickness from left to right, so that the thickest bands lay adjacent to the thinnest where they are split by the anterior formation of a new clear band. These granular lines contain the cell's characteristic cortical granules, which give the stripes their unique pigmentation. These endogenous pigments vary greatly in appearance, with red, green, and blue-green (Stentorin in S. coeruleus) being the most common. In research, these pigments are commonly used as a morphological trait to group species. For the organism, cortical granules serve a defensive function and are excreted in high volumes when the cell is under predation. The pigments released from the extrusion of these cortical granules have toxic properties that ward off, or sometimes even kill, attacking protists.

=== Cilia and motility ===
Diagram of the internal structures of a Stentor, highlighting the key organelles involved in its locomotion, feeding, and regeneration. 1 - cilia, 2 - oral pouch, 3 - micronucleus, 4 - macronuclear nodes, 5 - holdfast, 6 - peristome, 7 - gullet, 8 - food vacuole, 9 - contractile vacuole

The clear bands of the ectoplasm are where cilia are located. Each clear band houses a kinety, with numerous adjacent cilia longitudinally along the organism. These somatic cilia are shorter and often more stiff than membranellar (mouth) cilia located in polykinetid bunches throughout the oral apparatus. These clear bands and their associated cilia are most numerous where the granular bands are thinnest and are especially abundant at the membranellar bands to ensure proper feeding.

The nature of Stentor's fine body control and contractions are associated with fibres under the clear bands. There are two types of these fibres: km fibres made of microtubules and M bands made of microfilaments. The km fibres are long and connect directly to the kinetids. They are most likely responsible for maintaining structure and assisting in extension. M bands are bundles of microfilaments, lying underneath the km fibres. These bands control contraction and shorten/straighten depending on the contortion of the ectoplasm. These cytoskeletal fibres are highly specific and can cause localized contractions and extensions, allowing for the organism to conform to a variety of shapes. The cell also has numerous alveoli under the membrane to support its large and contorting surface. Stentor also has a contractile vacuole and associated pore at its left anterior side to expel excess intracellular water.

=== Feeding apparatus ===
The most specialized structure in Stentor is its feeding apparatus. The surface of the buccal (feeding) cavity is called the frontal field, which houses cilia and myonemes. Granular lines in this section can be as thin as one row of cortical granules, allowing for the dense packing of feeding cilia. These membranellar cilia connect in sheets down to the endoplasm, where they are packed into a root bundle and secured via a strengthened basal fibre. The frontal field spirals and condenses into the gullet, which is specialized to force food into the cell's cytostome. At the other end of the cell, the holdfast sticks to the substrate via secreted mucous and myoneme contractions.

Once Stentor has captured its prey, it corrals the prey into the oral pouch which then partially encloses. It is roughly around this point in which the feeding Stentor decides whether to consume the captured prey (although it is worth noting that food can still be rejected as late as the upper gullet). If the prey is rejected it will be ejected and passed down along the outside of the cell's body cilia towards the tail as to ensure it doesn't end up being accidentally consumed again. Long dead prey and non-organic material such as toxins or glass are more likely to be rejected, especially if the Stentor is otherwise well fed. Food is then passed into the gullet, an invaginated feeding apparatus lined with cilia and myonemes to aid in the passage of food items. The gullet's myonemes do a sort of peristalsis with rhythmic contractions forcing larger food items into an ectoplasmic food vacuole. Food vacuoles can also be formed inside the cytoplasm if prey escapes/ bursts its containing vesicle.

Not all prey can be wholistically phagocytized, especially large prey like other Stentor. In these cases, the buccal cavity will expand to fit part of the prey (the tail end if it's eating another Stentor) and will subsequently close, cleaving part of the prey off like taking a chunk from a piece of meat. This smaller food chunk will then be ingested as outlined above. Cannibalism has been observed in multiple species of Stentor, with planktonic individuals being drawn in to the vortex of secured and feeding individuals.

=== Nuclei and cell division ===
Like other ciliates, the nuclei of Stentor are split into a macronucleus and micronucleus. The macronucleus is highly polyploid and any one fragment can contain many copies of the entire transcriptionally active genome. The micronucleus is much smaller and contains information necessary for the formation of the macronucleus and is essential for the process of conjugation. Macronuclear shape is diverse in Stentor, with many species having moniliform (bead like), variform (tube like), and condensed (resembling an enlarged single nucleus) macronuclei. Conjugation is relatively rare, with most organisms dividing asexually by fission.

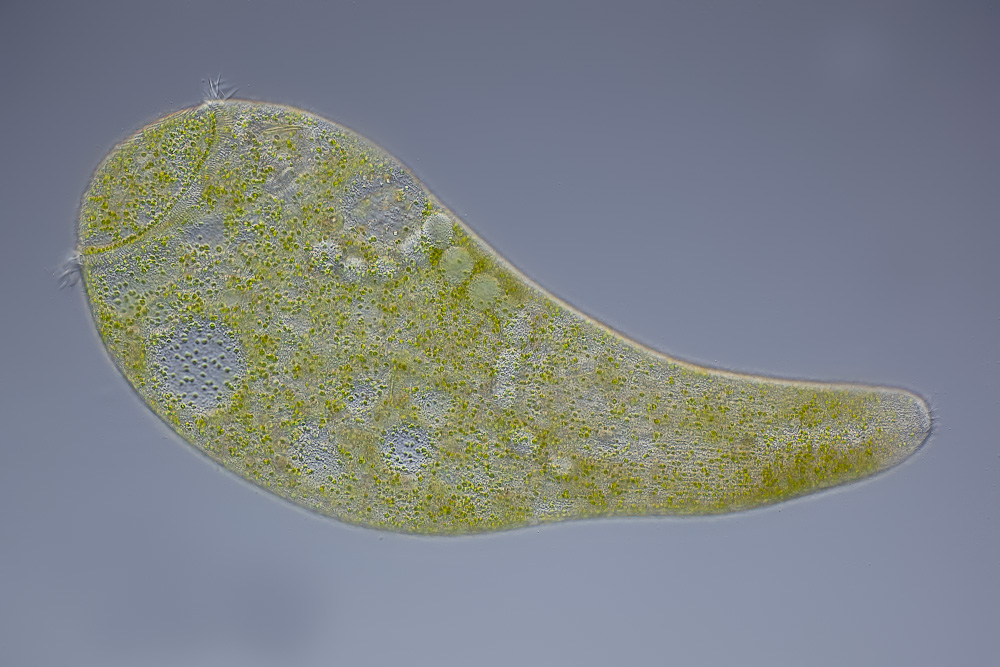
Stentor polymorphus with algal symbionts

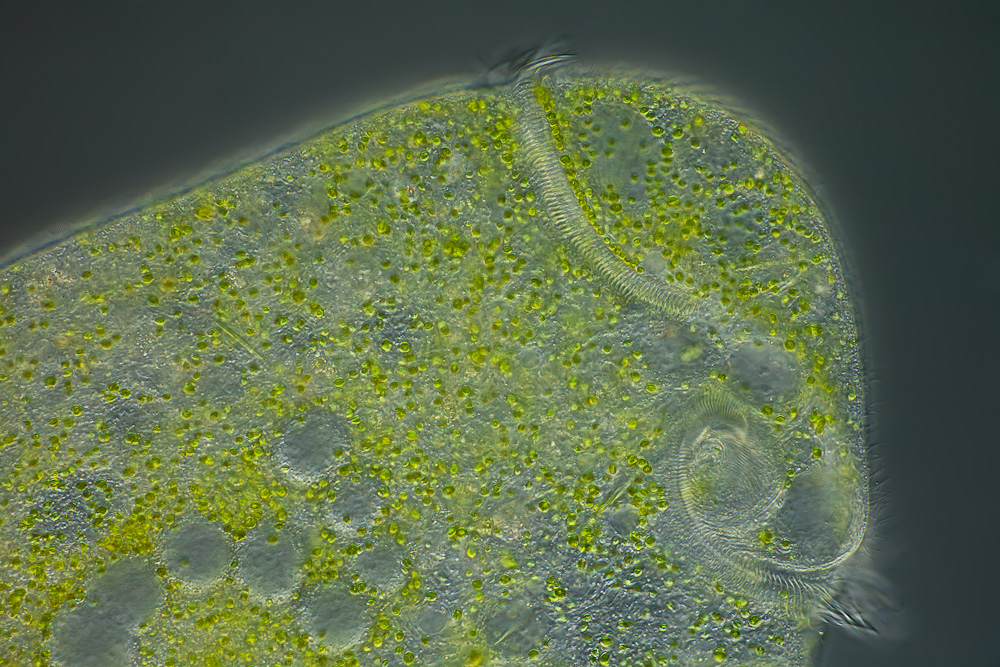
Stentor polymorphus with algal symbionts

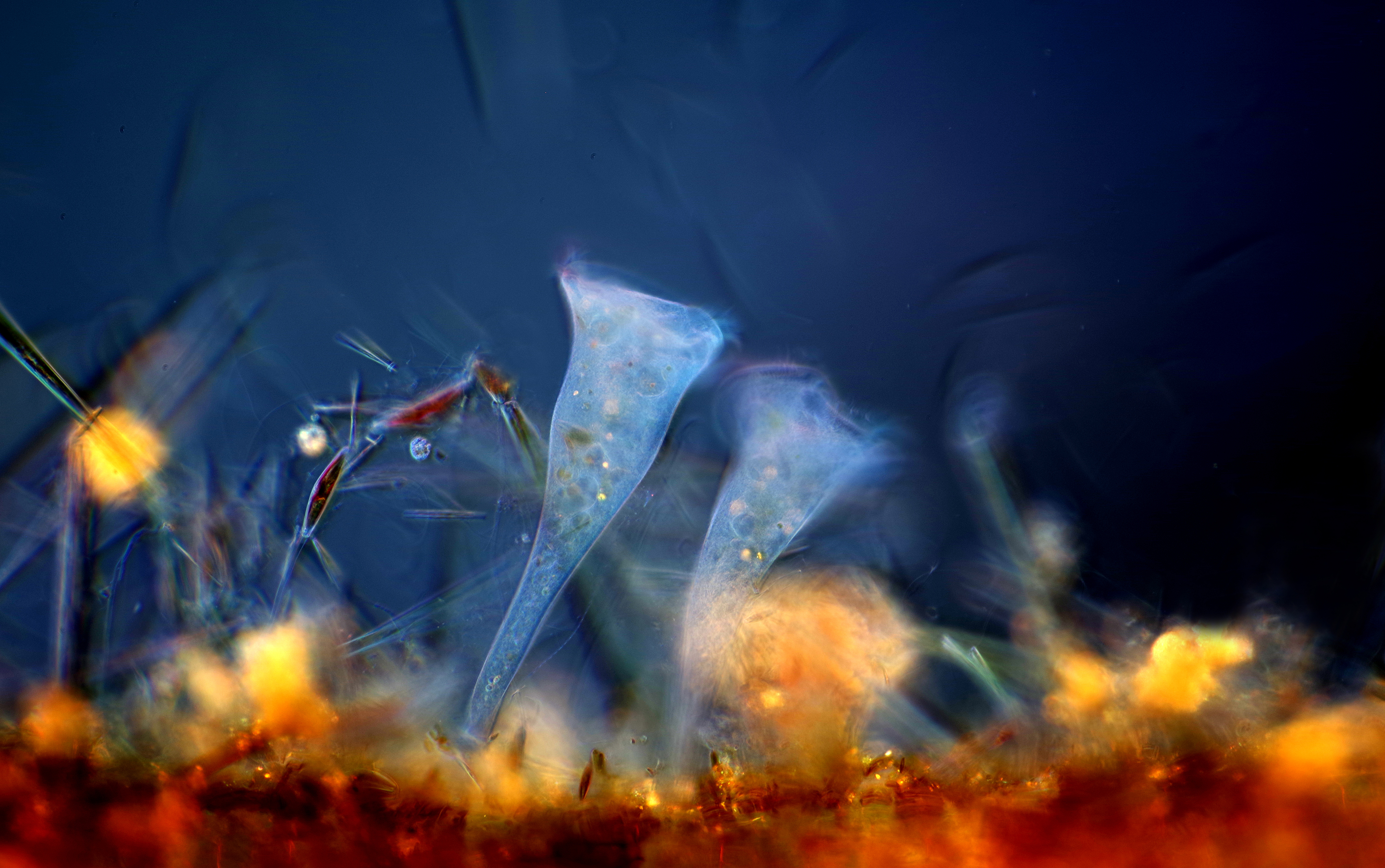
Stentors settled on water milfoil leaf

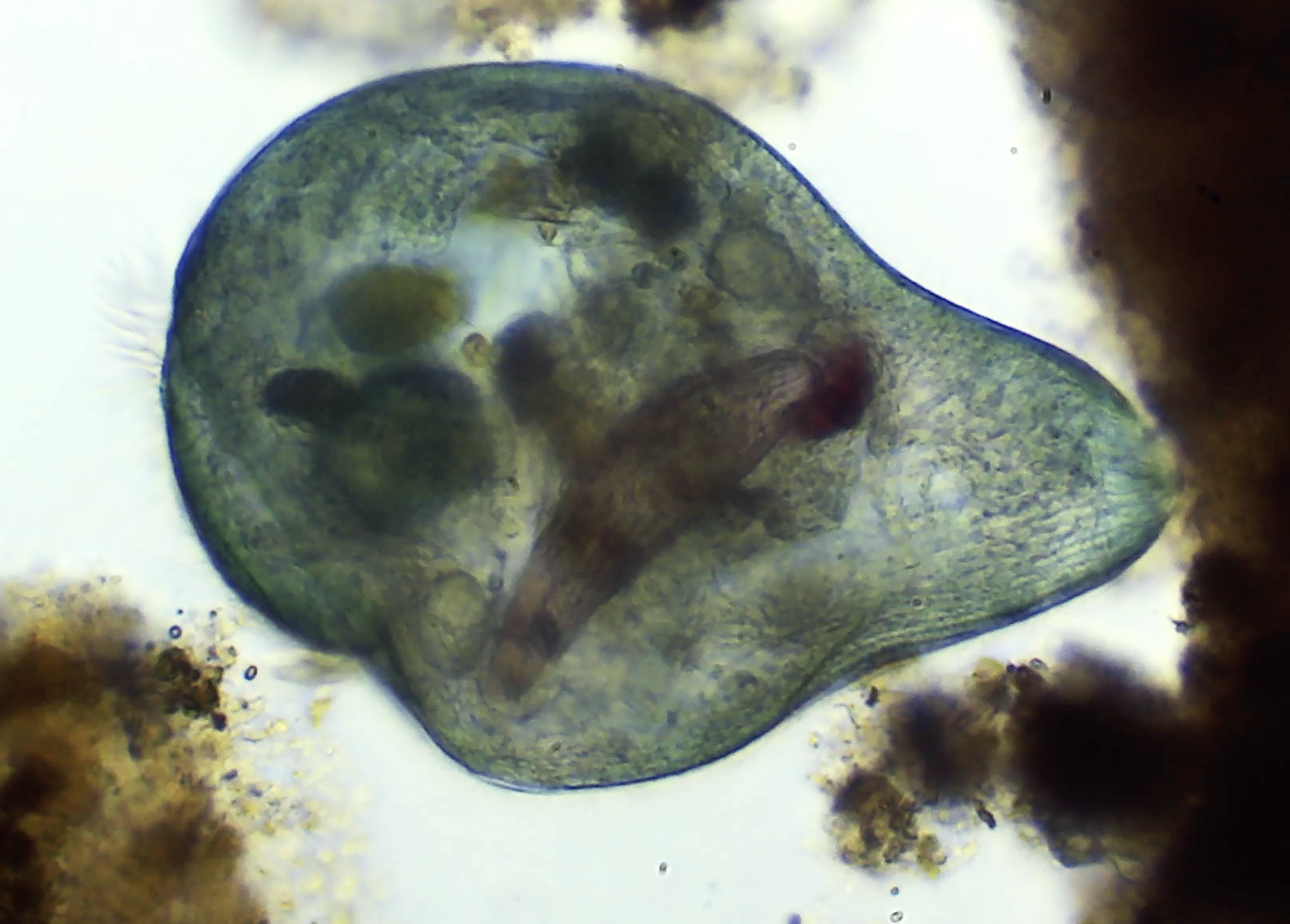
Stentor coeruleus digesting Blepharisma sp.

== Ecology ==
Although certain species of Stentor (S. multiformis) have been shown to live in marine and terrestrial habitats, the genus primarily lives within bodies of freshwater. However, many species are also found in more dystrophic or brackish freshwater environments. In a given pond the population of Stentor is roughly split 10:1, with the majority of individuals secured to the bottom substrate (such as algal filaments or detritus) by a tight adhesion of the holdfast and a small fraction of individuals planktonic, swimming along the current with body cilia.

=== Response to disturbance ===
When an environment becomes unsuitable, either by an increase in harmful toxins/predators or by a decrease in necessary resources, individuals will detach from the substrate and become planktonic. This detaching behaviour is a last resort, with numerous stress avoidance steps being taken by the individual before this. With a light physical stimulus, the Stentor will either ignore the source or bend towards it in search of food. Given further stressing via prodding or exposure to toxins, the cell will bend downwards in random directions until the stress ceases. If the stressing does not cease the individual may then reverse its cilia to push water away from itself or contract into a ball. Only after these avoidance measures are attempted will the organism detach its holdfast and seek a better feeding ground, though occasionally forceful attempts at removal will cause the cell itself to be ripped in half, rather than be removed from the surface. In this state their body becomes spheroid (up to six times shorter than their extended form) and swims until a more suitable environment is found, where it will sink down and secrete mucus to attach once again.

=== Feeding ===
Individuals conduct their feeding when attached to substrate, stretching their bodies lengthwise to more than two millimeters and opening their buccal cavities. Stentor feeds by synchronously beating the tightly bundled cilia (polykinetids) in the membranellar band surrounding the buccal cavity. This creates a vortex of water that pulls other planktonic protists towards its buccal cavity, after which buccal cilia pull the prey further inside (see morphology section for details on feeding). Certain species are known to have resting cysts.

=== Symbiosis ===
Similar to other aquatic organisms, many species of Stentor have developed a close association with endosymbiotic green algae (specifically Chlorella). When present, endosymbiotic Chlorella are densely scattered throughout the endoplasm. The endosymbionts provide sugars to sustain their host and feed on the Stentor's waste while benefiting from the protection of the ciliate. Stentors with symbionts can live without food for much longer than other individuals, although no species has become fully autotrophic. This endosymbiosis in Stentor is not obligate (except for S. polymorphus, which likely is dependent on its symbiont for an unknown specific vitamin). If the host Stentor dies and its cellular structure dissolves, the Chlorella will continue to persist as free-living algae. This association is naturally dissolved in complete darkness, where almost all Chlorella symbionts will disappear from the host Stentor (although some always persist, particularly in the posterior end of the Stentor). Complete dissociation has been accomplished in a lab setting, when Stentors were deprived of sunlight with ample food and heat they were able to divide rapidly enough that some did not carry their endosymbionts into the next generation. This mutualism is always beneficial for the Stentor, with individuals supported by Chlorella being able to outperform Stentors lacking symbionts.

=== Blooms ===
Many species of Stentor have also been known to cause blooms, where up to 90% of all ciliate biomass in the ecosystem belongs to the specific blooming Stentor. This is most frequent in the smaller and commonly planktonic species, which bear a stronger association with endosymbiotic algae. The blooming Stentor will cover the surface of a lake or pond giving it the coloured appearance of the species' cortical granules. The limiting nutrient that causes Stentor blooms is not commonly known, although certain cases have been studied and found to correlate with increased rainfall which can provide vitamin B_{12} producing bacteria or increased phosphorus. Although Stentor blooms have shown some evidence of damage to fish life and water purity, they are considerably less toxic than more typical algal blooms.

== Practical importance ==
Although their large size and robust endoplasm make Stentor good subjects of study, their difficulty to culture and low sex frequency has kept them from being more widely studied. The strength of Stentor as a model for research lies with its remarkable regenerative abilities. If it contains a fragment of macronucleus and some membrane/cortex, any small piece of an organism can regenerate into a fully formed Stentor. This regeneration maintains proper polarity and arrangement. If an individual is cut into many pieces it will first align its ectoplasmic bands. Aligned and fused sections of ectoplasm are nucleation sites where more patches attach onto. Once the somatic features are restored the frontal field will regenerate. Because of this, Stentor is often the subject of a wide range of grafting experiments. Separate individuals can exchange nuclei, cytoplasm, and fuse together all while maintaining function. If two individuals are grafted together, they can even persist as a doublet dividing as one. Stentor can therefore provide insight into cellular specificity at multiple levels. The regenerative properties of Stentor can also be usefully applied to larger models of healing in order to understand the origin and cellular mechanisms behind healing in animals.

== Systematics ==
Stentor was first described by the influential Genevan naturalist Abraham Trembley in 1744. Trembley initially misidentified the organism as a type of freshwater Hydra and in a letter addressed to the Royal Society described it as "Polypus", a "minute water animal". This initial description of the organism focused on its trumpet shape (with descriptions of both the buccal cavity and holdfast), circular like movement of its oral cilia, partial planktonic behaviour, and vortex feeding. The first use of the name "Stentor" was by German naturalist Lorenz Oken in 1815, although it referred to a much larger taxonomically unspecific group compared to today's genus.

The first major organization of the genus was done by another German naturalist, Christian Gottfried Ehrenberg in 1831. He published a review containing the known species of Stentor and defined the type species of the genus as S. muelleri, a freshwater Stentor with a moniliform macronucleus and colourless cortical granules (see type species section). Further reviews and revisions were made in the following century by micro-zoologists Friedrich Stein (1867), William Saville-Kent (1881), Herbert Johnson (1893), Alfred Kahl (1932), and Vance Tartar (1961), all of which are integrated into Willhelm Foissner and S. Wölfl's 1994 review and revision of the genus. Foissner and Wölfl arranged the genus by the presence of endosymbionts, the shape of the macronucleus, and the pigmentation of the pellicular cortical granules, delineating nineteen species of Stentor with twenty-seven indeterminate species or species that were incorrectly listed as distinct from other taxa.

Since this revision there has been further tinkering to the genus. In 2002, Hideo Kumazawa used his extensive notes and descriptions of the freshwater Stentor species around Hiroshima, Japan to further classify the genus and define a novel species (S. cornutus). He focused on characters not covered in the Foissner and Wölfl review, such as the characteristics of the oral pouch, orientation of stiff (somatic) cilia, and grafting experiments. Finally in 2006, Ying-Chun Gong constructed a clade using small subunit ribosomal rRNA from three Stentor species, indicating they are sister to the genus Blepharisma.

== Video gallery ==
Stentor muelleri in mucous lorica

Stentor coeruleus dividing (binary fission)

Stentor muelleri, magnified 1000X

== See also ==
- Stentor (disambiguation)
