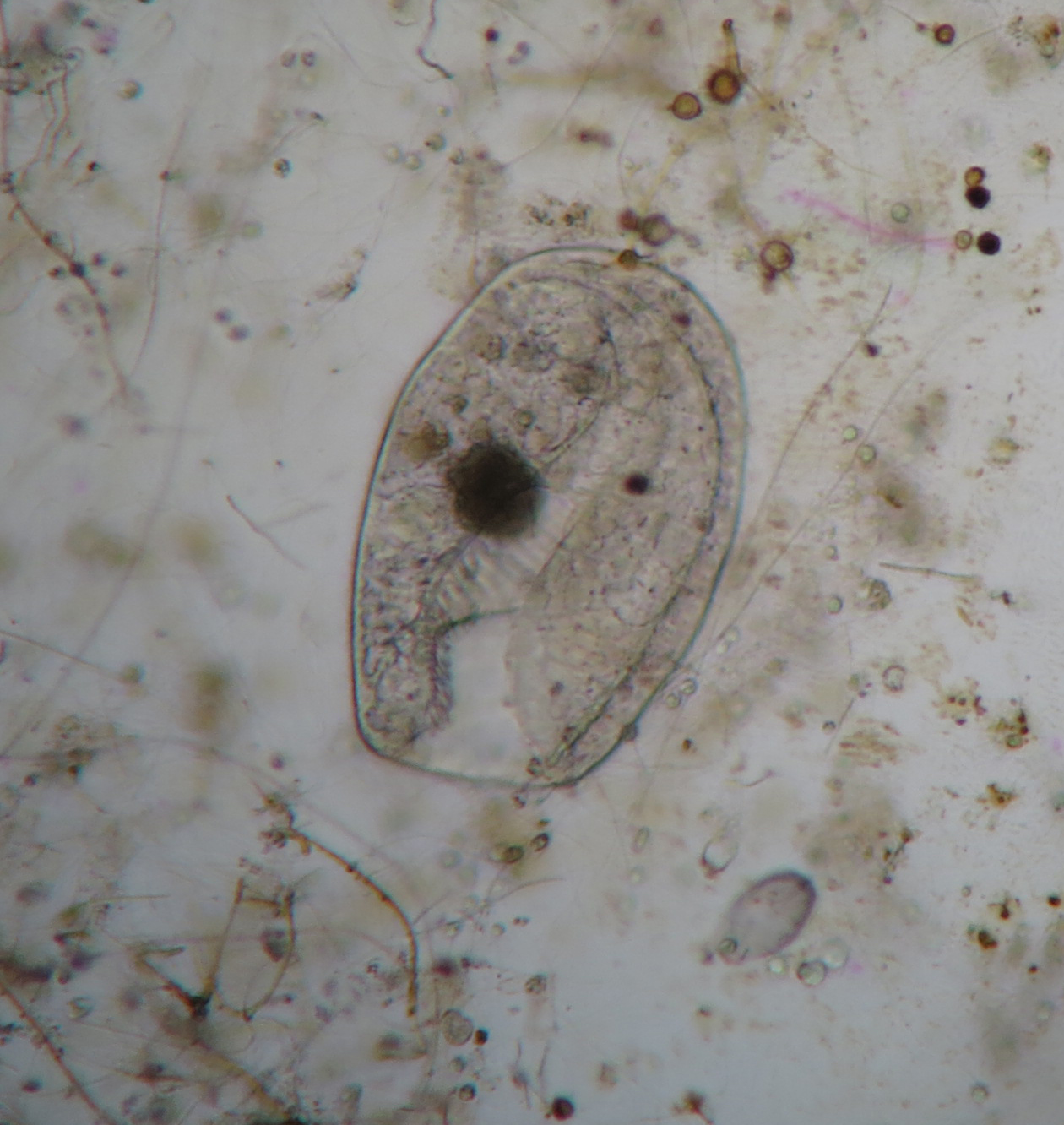
- Bursaria ovata

Scientific classification
- Domain: Eukaryota
- Clade: Sar
- Superphylum: Alveolata
- Phylum: Ciliophora
- Class: Colpodea
- Order: Bursariomorphida
- Family: Bursariidae
- Genus: Bursaria; O. F. Müller, 1773

= Bursaria (ciliate) =

Genus of single-celled organisms

Bursaria is a genus of ciliates in the class Colpodea. They are relatively large and feed on other protists in freshwater habitats.

== Description ==
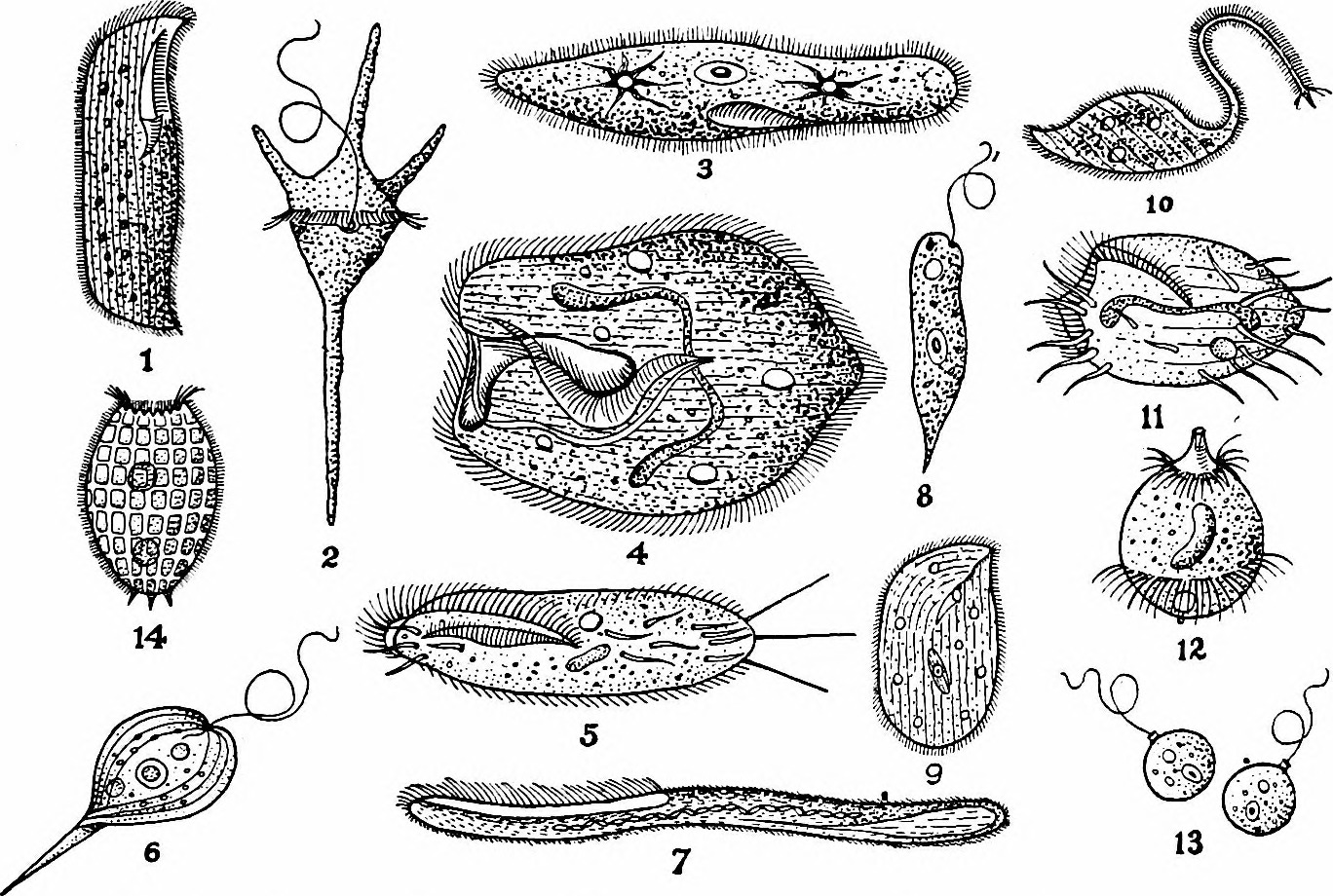
Bursaria sp. (no. 4) and other common aquatic protists. The oral end of the cell is shown pointing to the left.

The cell body of Bursaria is scoop-shaped, and can be up to 1 mm long. Their oral region is crescent-shaped, and there is a band of membranelles (compound structures composed of multiple cilia) leading into the mouth. They live in the plankton of freshwater environments and ingest other protists, including algae and other ciliates. Bursaria are the largest-sized colpodean ciliates.

== Systematics ==
Bursaria is the sole genus in the family Bursariidae. The genus was originally described by O. F. Müller in 1773, with B. hirundinella as the type species. It was formerly classified as a heterotrich, but is now classified as a member of the class Colpodea, based on the development of its oral structures (stomatogenesis) and its ultrastructure.
