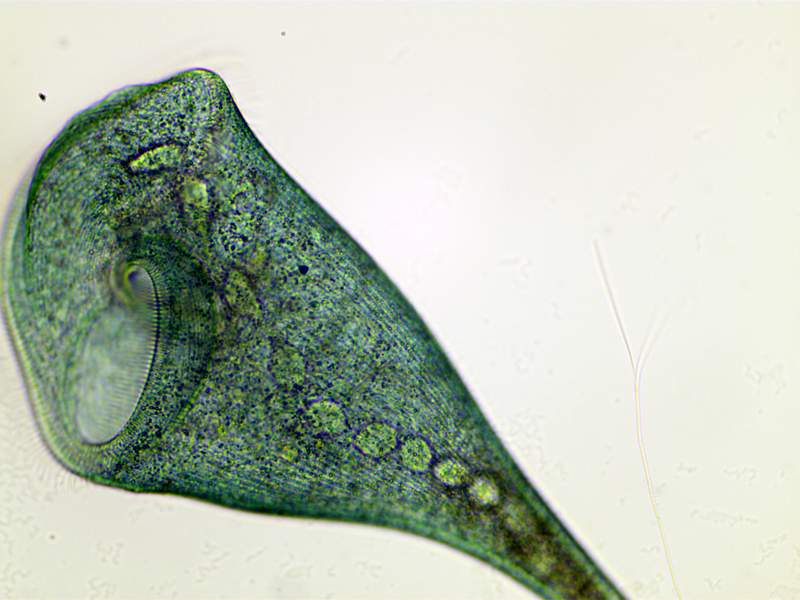

Scientific classification
- Domain: Eukaryota
- Supergroup: Alveolata
- Phylum: Ciliophora
- Class: Heterotrichea
- Order: Heterotrichida
- Family: Stentoridae
- Genus: Stentor
- Species: S. coeruleus

Binomial name
- Stentor coeruleus Ehrenberg, 1830

= Stentor coeruleus =

Species of single-celled organism

Stentor coeruleus ( (Note: The pronunciation of S. coeruleus is counterintuitive because the "oe" is actually the Latin character œ and is pronounced as if it were just an E.)) is a protist in the family Stentoridae which is characterized by being a very large ciliate that measures 0.5 to 2 millimetres when fully extended.

S. coeruleus specifically appears as an elongated trumpet. It contains a macronucleus that looks like a string of beads that are contained within a ciliate that is blue to blue-green in color. It has the ability to contract into a ball through the contraction of its many myonemes .

Stentor coeruleus is known for its regenerative abilities. When this organism is cut in half, each half is able to regenerate a cell that has its normal anatomy provided that each cut part includes some of the macro-nucleus. It feeds by means of cilia that carry food into the gullet.

== DNA ==
The genetic code is the standard code, and not the usual form for ciliates. The introns are unusually small, only 15 or 16 nucleotides long.

== Reproduction ==
S. coeruleus is capable of sexual reproduction, or conjugation, but primarily reproduces asexually by binary fission.

== Gallery ==
Diagram in a 1907 edition of Popular Science Monthly.

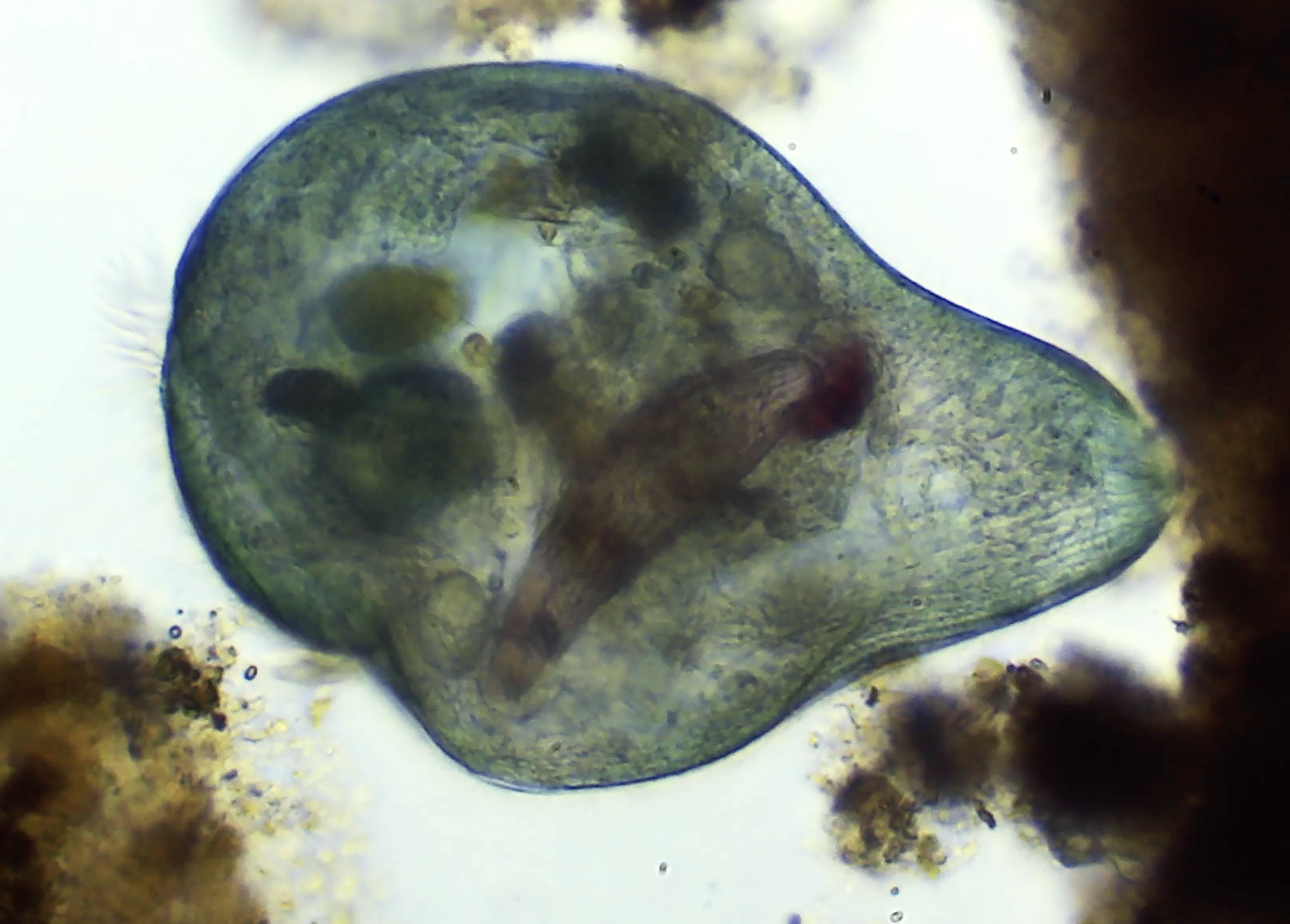
Stentor coeruleus digesting Blepharisma sp.

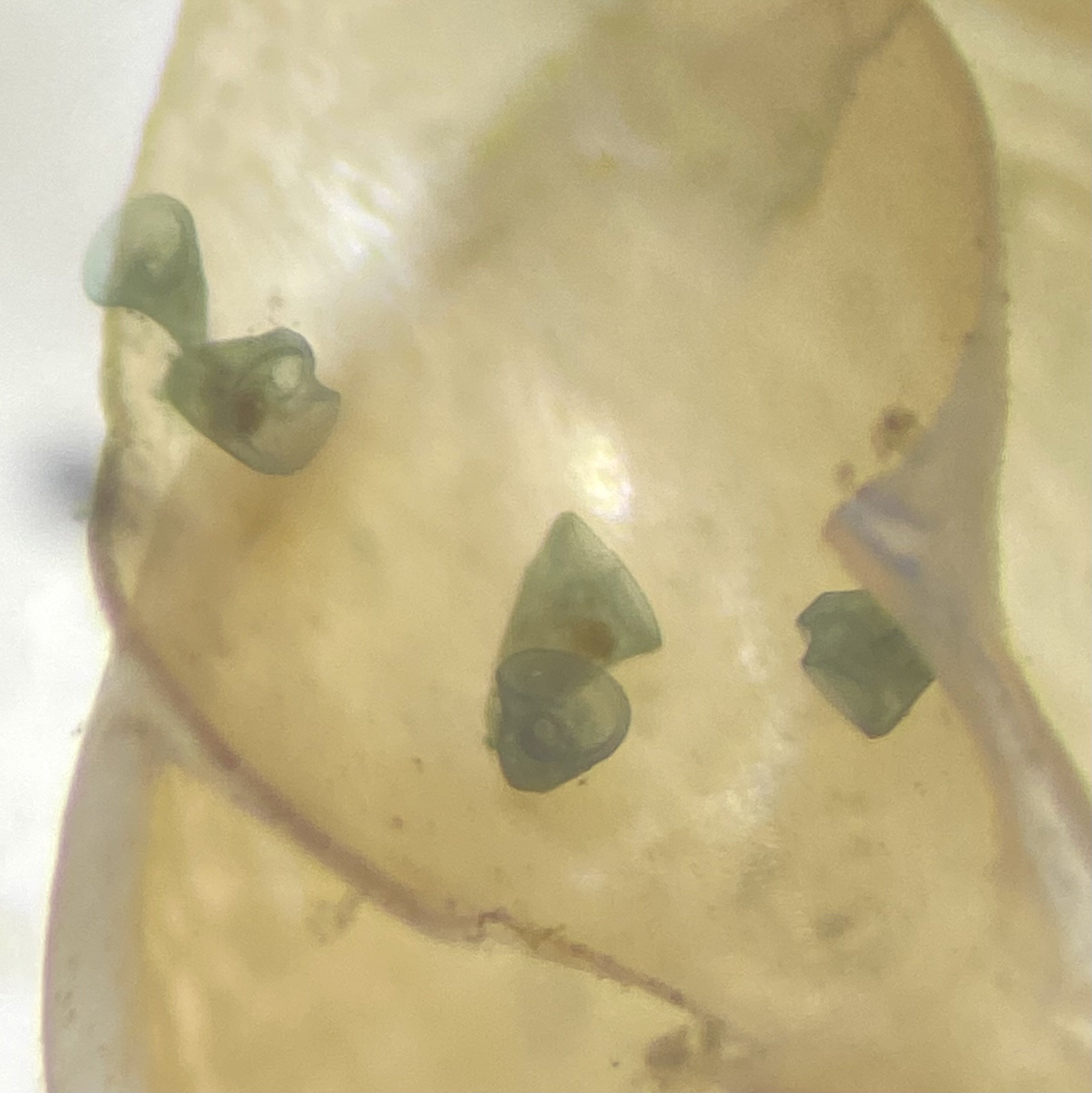
Large S. coeruleus specimens from a fish tank, viewed using a stereo microscope. The ciliates are attached to a small shell, likely that of an ostracod.

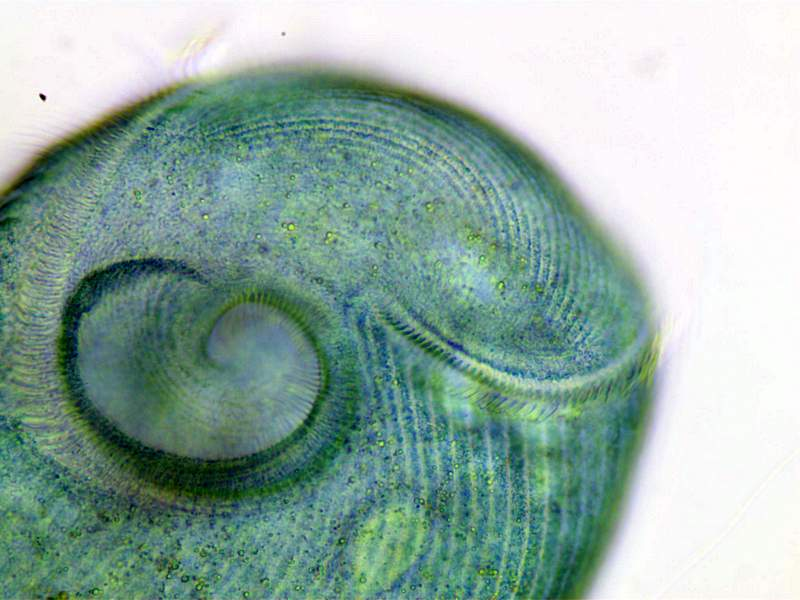
Stentor coeruleus mouth
