= Macronucleus =

Nucleus in ciliates, involved in non-reproductive cell functions

A macronucleus (formerly also meganucleus) is the larger type of nucleus in ciliates. Macronuclei are polyploid and undergo direct division without mitosis. It controls the non-reproductive cell functions, such as metabolism. During conjugation, the macronucleus disintegrates, and a new one is formed by karyogamy of the micronuclei.

Macronuclei contain hundreds to thousands of chromosomes, each present in many copies. There is no mechanism to precisely partition this complex genome equally during nuclear division; thus, how the cell manages to maintain a balanced genome after generations of divisions is unknown.

== See also ==
- Micronucleus
