= Chimpanzee violence =

Violence is a pervasive feature of chimpanzee communities

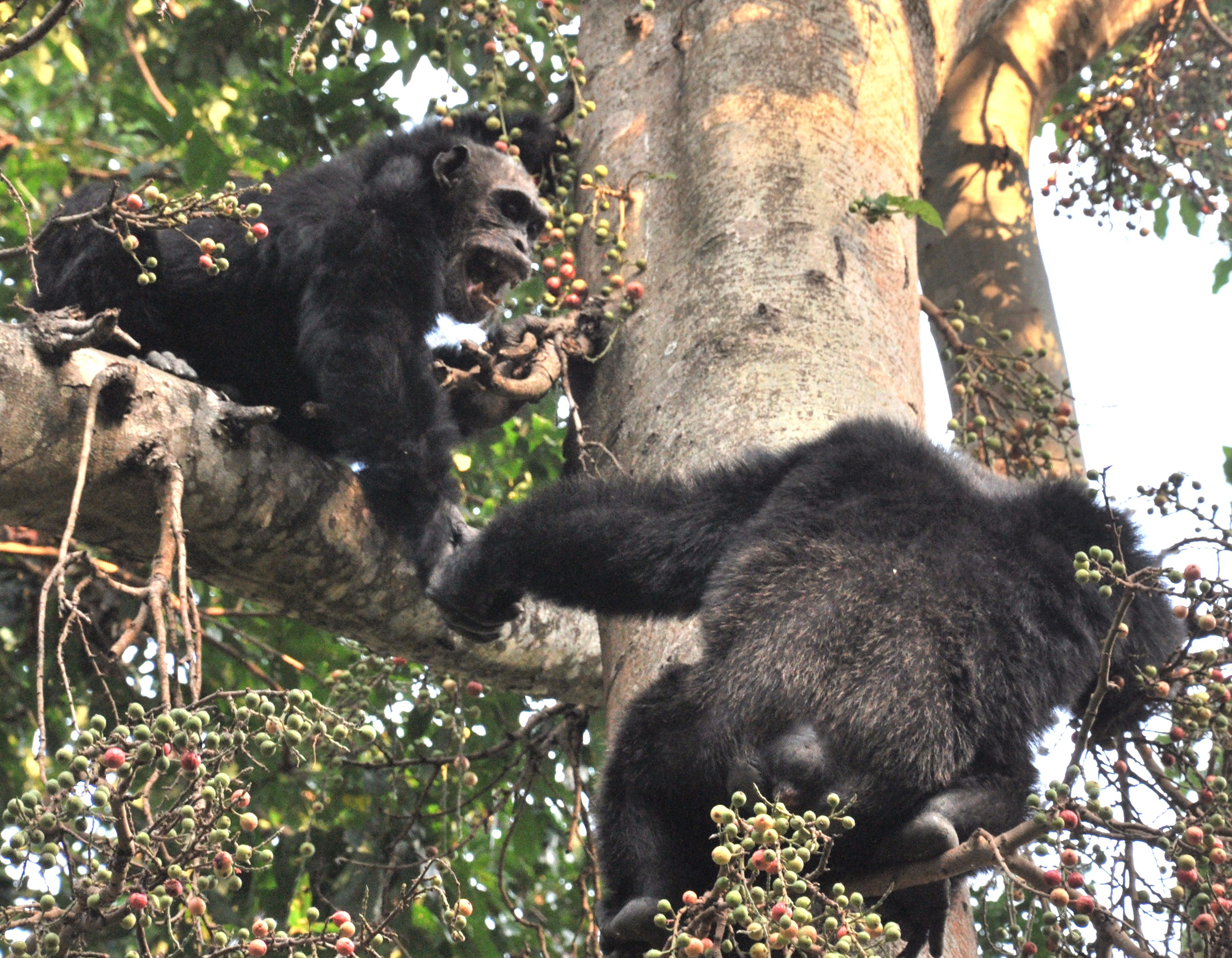
Males in Mahale National Park, Tanzania

Primatologists have been observing and recording chimpanzee violence for decades. Beginning in the 1960s, primatologist Jane Goodall documented extensive violence among wild chimpanzees in Tanzania. Her observations overturned earlier views that chimpanzees were uniformly peaceful animals. Shortly thereafter, a team of Japanese primatologists, led by Toshisada Nishida, confirmed Goodall's finding of lethal intergroup aggression among chimpanzee communities. Subsequent field studies have provided further insights into the nature of chimpanzee violence, which includes violence within a community (for example, infanticide, sexual coercion and killing of adults) and across communities (including lethal attacks that, over time, have culminated in the extermination of neighboring chimpanzee communities).

This violence exists side by side with rituals of cooperation and affiliation that play a role in male affiliation and coalition building. The picture of chimpanzee violence that emerges from these field studies is a complex one; it consists of conflict, cooperation and cooperation in conflict.

Primatologists have compared these findings with those of field studies of bonobos (a closely related species). This comparison shows that even small genetic differences can be associated with striking differences in behavior across species. It also shows that both violent aggression and peaceful cooperation can take place without a supporting role of complex cultures and social norms typically associated with humans.

== Overview ==
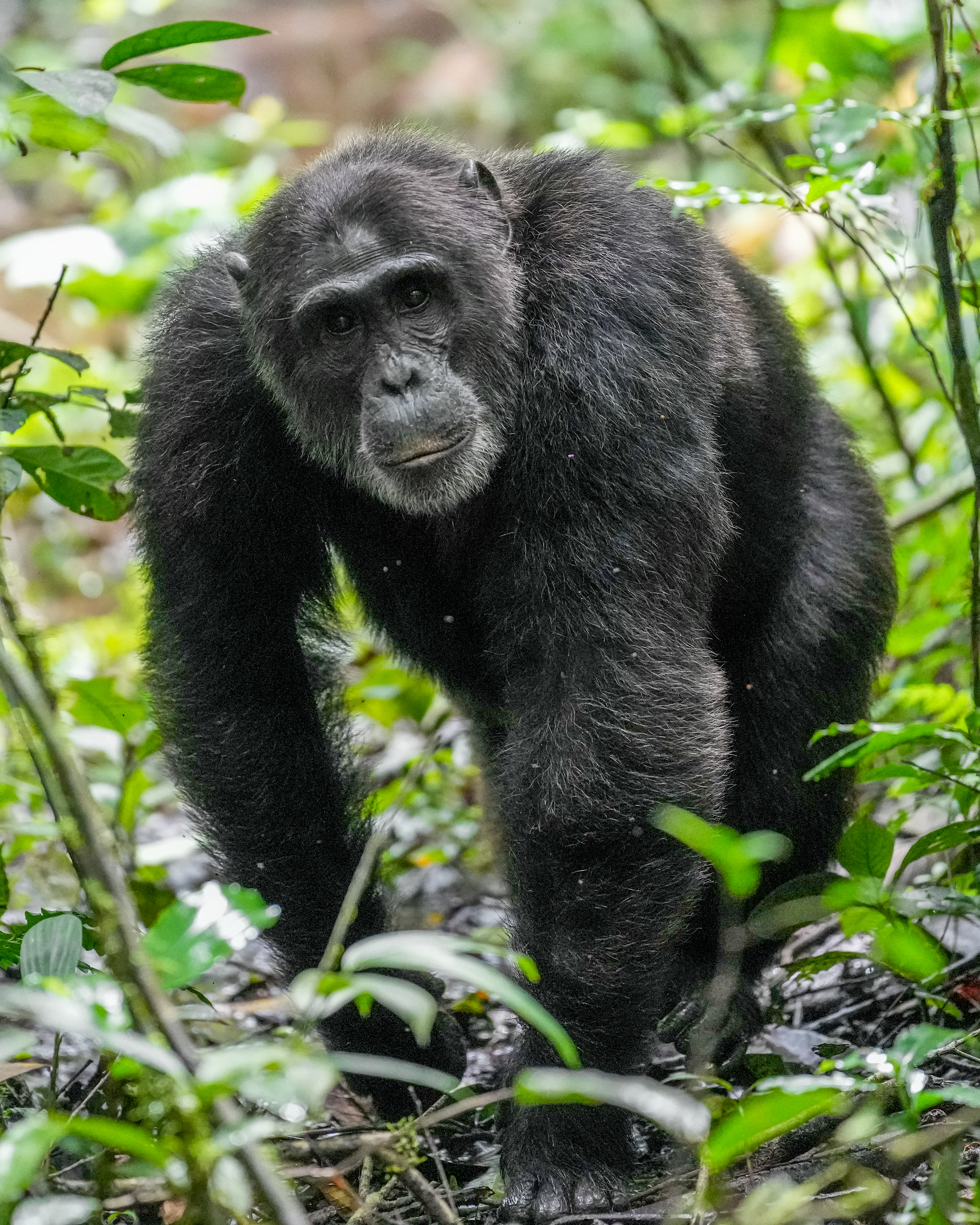
Alpha male walking in Kibale National Park

Chimpanzee societies are characterized by male dominance hierarchies, coalition formation, territorial patrols, and occasional lethal violence between neighboring communities. Inter-group relations between chimpanzee communities are "predictably hostile." Each community has a clear alpha male and high ranking males gain clear reproductive benefits in the form of greater access to fertile females.

Males cooperate in defending the group's territory and may attack isolated members of rival groups. Attacks are always one-sided and only occur when the attacking party has clear numerical superiority. Such conflicts can result in serious injury or death. These physical struggles have clear physiological costs for the males.

Within the same community, males compete for mating opportunities and high ranking males have preferential access to fecundable females. Although most mating occurs through social interactions within the group, coercive sexual behavior has been observed. Males are described as "gregarious" and spend significant amount of time in activities that contribute to group cohesion and affiliation. They also form coalitions (often dyadic) of varying stability with other males, especially males of the same age group and rank. Building affiliations is accomplished through such behaviours as mutual grooming, meat sharing and maintaining physical proximity. Kinship is found to have only a "limited" impact on the pattern of male cooperation and affiliation.

Female chimpanzees leave their natal group at the onset of sexual maturity. They are described as being "relatively asocial" and are "aggressive primarily in the context of feeding competition. Mother chimpanzees spend much of their time alone with their offspring or in nursery parties with other mothers and young." Females with young tend to use an individual foraging range which is smaller than the range defended by males. Females also have a hierarchical ranking that confers fitness benefits. Infanticides perpetrated by coalitions of females have been observed. Despite evidence that female rank has important effects on reproduction, aggression by parous females against other parous females is rare, and female dominance ranks are stable over long periods of time." Thus, the propensity for violence is primarily, but not exclusively, a characteristic of male chimpanzees.

Field research conducted over decades shows not only that chimpanzee societies engage in conspecific killings, but they do this more often than many other mammalian species. According to Aaron Sandal and David Watts, many “animals engage in aggression, but chimpanzees stand out in terms of fatal attacks on adults of their own species.” Observations from three long-term field sites — Gombe Stream National Park, Mahale Mountains National Park, and Kibale National Park — played a central role in establishing that violence between neighboring chimpanzee communities is a natural, adaptive feature of chimpanzee behavior. Specifically, a compilation of long term field studies found the following:

.... we compiled information from 18 chimpanzee communities and 4 bonobo communities studied over five decades. Our data include 152 killings (n = 58 observed, 41 inferred, and 53 suspected killings) by chimpanzees in 15 communities and one suspected killing by bonobos. We found that males were the most frequent attackers (92% of participants) and victims (73%); most killings (66%) involved intercommunity attacks; and attackers greatly outnumbered their victims (median 8:1 ratio).

== Field studies ==
Scientific understanding of lethal intergroup aggression in chimpanzees developed gradually over several decades. When Jane Goodall first reported organized, lethal warfare among chimpanzees in the early 1970s — what became known as the Gombe Chimpanzee War — many scientists simply didn't believe her. At the time, there was a widespread view that humans had invented warfare and that our chimpanzees lived in fundamentally peaceful societies. Goodall's observations gradually convinced the scientific community that coalitionary killing was not exclusively human. Field studies have been conducted at at least 40 sites across Africa and these show conclusively that violence is a "pervasive feature of chimpanzee societies", as is cooperation.

=== Gombe Stream National Park ===
The first documented evidence of sustained lethal aggression and, in particular, of intergroup aggression among wild chimpanzees came from Gombe Stream National Park in Tanzania, where primatologist Jane Goodall began field studies in 1960.

Between 1974 and 1978, researchers observed a prolonged conflict between two communities that had formed following the division of a previously unified group. During what later became known as the Gombe Chimpanzee War, adult males from the larger Kasakela community systematically attacked members of the smaller Kahama community. Several males were killed, females disappeared or joined the victorious community, and the Kahama community eventually ceased to exist.

Goodall's observations challenged the prevailing view that chimpanzees were fundamentally peaceful animals and suggested that organized coalitionary violence was not unique to humans. Initially, many primatologists questioned her finding that the violence reflected natural chimpanzee behavior. Some suggested that provisioning—the practice of supplying food to habituate chimpanzees to human observers—may have increased competition and artificially promoted aggression. However, subsequent field studies’ findings confirmed Goodall's results. By the late twentieth century, evidence from multiple field sites had persuaded many researchers that coalitionary aggression between neighboring communities formed part of the normal behavioral repertoire of wild chimpanzees, although the frequency and intensity of such aggression varied among sub-populations.

=== Mahale Mountains National Park ===
In 1966, a team of Japanese primatologists, led by Toshisada Nishida, began a field study of chimpanzees in Mahale Mountains National Park, also in Tanzania. The research project provided important confirmation that lethal intergroup aggression was not confined to Gombe. The researchers' observations documented territorial patrols, coalitionary attacks, and occasional lethal encounters between neighboring chimpanzee communities under ecological conditions that differed from those at Gombe.

Over a long period of time, the study documented the disappearance of what researchers named the K-group of chimpanzees, which numbered about 30 individuals in 1974. The last member died in 1982. Researchers attributed this decline to "attacks by the larger M-group, studied from 1968 to the present." These findings weakened the argument that the Gombe conflict resulted primarily from food provisioning by the research group or other unusual local circumstances.

=== Ngogo, Kibale National Park ===
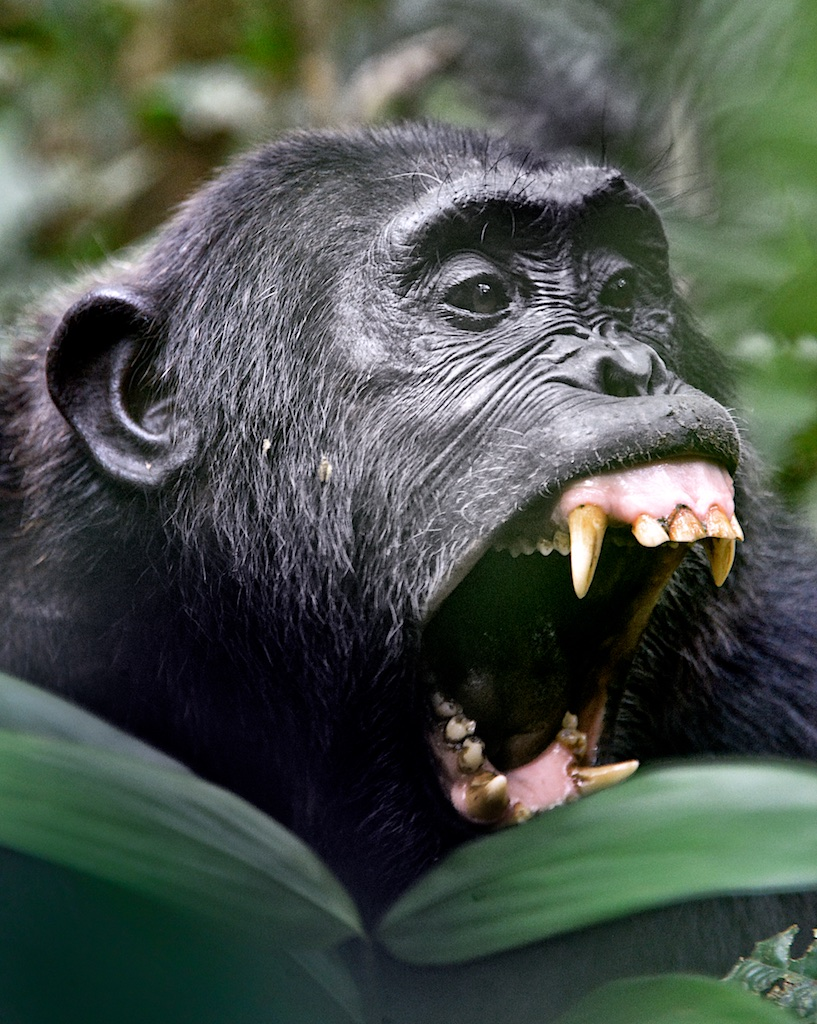
The large canine teeth of a male chimpanzee in Kibale National Park

Another long term field study of wild chimpanzees not only supported earlier findings, but also provided evidence for the adaptive significance of inter-community violence. This study observed the Ngogo chimpanzee community in Kibale National Park, Uganda, one of the largest and most-studied chimpanzee populations. Since 2015, the Ngogo chimpanzee community has fractured into rival factions which have engaged in a protacted violent conflict, known as the Ngogo chimpanzee war.

The Ngogo observations differed from those at Gombe in several important respects. They were recorded by multiple researchers using systematic behavioral observations over many years and involved an unusually large chimpanzee community. These observations showed measurable ecological benefits in the form of increased access to food resources and territory, a finding that the authors interpret as supporting the adaptive value of inter-community violence.

These findings have been interpreted as supporting the imbalance-of-power hypothesis, which proposes that chimpanzees preferentially attack neighboring individuals when numerical superiority minimizes the risk of injury to the attackers. Under this hypothesis, coalitionary killing can increase reproductive success by expanding territory and improving access to resources at relatively low cost for the attacker.

Some researchers caution that the exceptional size of the Ngogo community and the favorable ecological conditions at Kibale National Park may limit the extent to which these observations can be generalized to all chimpanzee populations. Nevertheless, the Ngogo findings offer evidence that lethal coalitionary aggression can produce long-term fitness advantages (that is, greater food availability).

== Types of aggression ==
=== Within-community aggression ===
- Dominance aggression. This type an aggression in pursuit of and maintenance of hierarchical rank is part of the everyday “politics” of chimpanzee society. Adult males compete for status and, relatedly, for access to fertile females. They do this by charging, biting, dragging and intimidating rivals. Displays include branch shaking, throwing rocks or sticks, piloerection (hair standing on end) and loud vocalisations. Serious injuries are relatively uncommon during this type of aggression because opponents usually submit before the fights escalate. Though this competition for rank inflicts high physiological costs, the dominant males gain clear reproductive benefits by monopolizing access to fertile females. In contrast, females are aggressive mainly in the context of feeding competition. High ranking females clearly gain important fitness benefits from their rank, but dominance aggression among females is rare and female dominance ranks are stable over long periods of time.
- Aggressions involving coalitions. Cooperating in order to engage more effectively in conflict is another hallmark of chimpanzee society. Rather than fighting one-on-one, males (and, more rarely, females) recruit allies. Two three or even ten males may gang up on a single individual. Coalitionary aggression has been shown to confer fitness benefits in the form of ascension in the rank hierarchy and improved mating opportunities. Females also form coalitions in order to engage in aggression. One example occurred in an infanticide where a mother and daughter cooperated in the killing and eating of three chimpanzee infants over a two year period.
- Infanticide and cannibalism. Both male and female chimpanzees engage in infanticide. These acts can be accompanied by cannibalism — the infant is wholly or partially consumed. When a female is the aggressor she often acts in coalition with another female. Intergroup aggression also can involve the killing and consumption of neighbouring infants. Explanations for such behavior include: accelerating the mother's return to fertility, eliminating future competition, nutritional benefit if the infant is eaten, and social competition.
- Sexual coercion. Males frequently intimidate esterous females. Behaviours include: chasing, hitting, biting, preventing females from leaving, and aggressive harassment before or after copulation.

=== Inter-community aggression ===
==== Patrols ====
Territorial boundary control patrols have been observed in three field studies and are known to be an important activity in chimp society. The patrols leave the main group in a single file and seek out Patrolling is mainly an activity of males, but infertile females may also participate. More males in the group tends to translate into higher frequency of patrols. During the patrols, the group may kill chimpanzees from neighbouring communities.

==== Ambush attacks ====
If the patrol discovers a lone neighboring chimpanzee, the males (sometimes accompanied by females) may rush the chimpanzee as a group. As a general rule, victims consist of isolated males or occasionally females, adolescents or infants separated from their group. The attackers always enjoy overwhelming numerical superiority. At times, these attacks are associated with cannibalism.

==== Territorial conquest ====
During the Ngogo field study, researchers were able to document not merely isolated killings, but an apparent longer term pursuit of territorial conquest. They observed repeated patrols associated with occasional, but repeated killings. In the Ngogo study, this led to the progressive disappearance of the neighboring community and to the occupation of the newly vacant territory. This, in turn, increased food resources for the conquering group and led to more females within the enlarged range. This observation provided stronger support than Gombe for the idea that coalitionary killing can yield measurable fitness benefits.

== Scientific views on chimpanzee violence ==
Findings of field studies of chimpanzees increasingly point toward violence, cooperation and cooperation in violence as being adaptive traits inherent to the species. With regard to in-group aggression related to the dominance ranking, the fitness benefits conferred by preferential access to food and mating opportunities are clear. For the more complicated question of inter-group aggression, some researchers now view such aggression as an evolutionarily evolved strategy that chimpanzees can employ when the costs of aggression are comparatively low and the benefits high. Costs include the energy used in aggression, the opportunity costs of time spent patrolling and attacking (which could instead be used to acquire food) and the risk of injury. For benefits, the field studies suggest that violent domination or even annihilation of neighbouring groups can result in expansion of territory (and presumably improved access to food) and transfers of fertile females to the dominant group.

Researchers continue to debate the ecological and evolutionary factors that influence the frequency of aggressive behavior in specific locations. Although lethal intergroup aggression is now recognized as a recurrent feature of chimpanzee behavior, it is not observed with equal frequency in all populations, suggesting that environmental and demographic factors also play an important role in determining when such behavior occurs. Variables proposed as possible influences on rates of intercommunity violence include population density, food availability, the number of adult males within a community, opportunities for territorial expansion, and local habitat characteristics. However, it is easier to evoke a general evolutionary explanation for why violence exists than it is to explain specific events in specific locations.

== Comparison with bonobos and relevance for humans ==
Chimpanzees and bonobos are sister species, together forming the genus Pan. Humans belong to the genus Homo, which diverged from the lineage leading to Pan roughly 6–7 million years ago. Chimpanzees and bonobos diverged from each other much more recently, probably around 1–2 million years ago, after the formation of the Congo River separated ancestral populations. Genetically, the three species have much in common: human DNA is 98.7% identical to that of both chimpanzees and bonobos. Chimpanzees and bonobos, however, share more than 99.6% of their DNA.

=== Bonobos ===
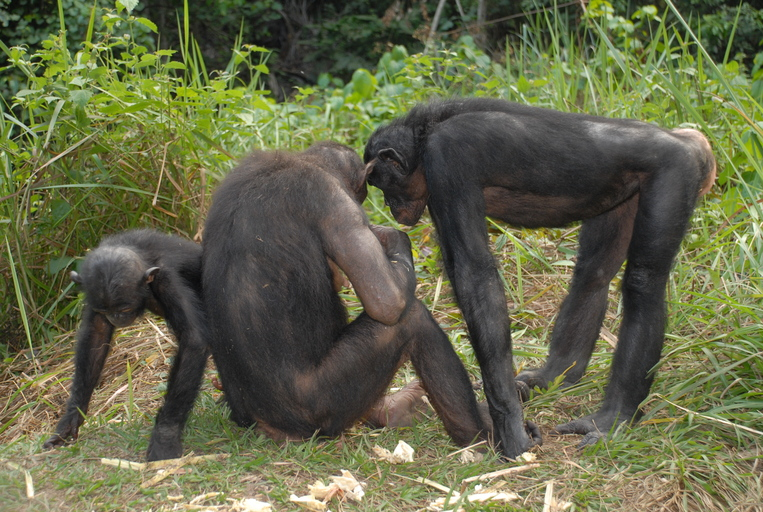
Group of bonobos

The discovery that chimpanzees regularly engage in coalitionary aggression and, under some circumstances, lethal intercommunity violence has prompted comparisons with bonobos (Pan paniscus), the only other living species of the genus Pan. The comparison between chimpanzees and bonobos has become a central topic in primatology because it demonstrates that closely related species can evolve strikingly different patterns of aggression, cooperation, and social organization. Despite their close genetic relationship, the two species differ markedly in their social organization. Bonobo societies, in contrast to chimpanzees, are characterized by female-led hierarchies and stronger female alliances. At the top of the hierarchy is a coalition of high-ranking females and males typically headed by an older, experienced matriarch who acts as the decision-maker and leader of the group.

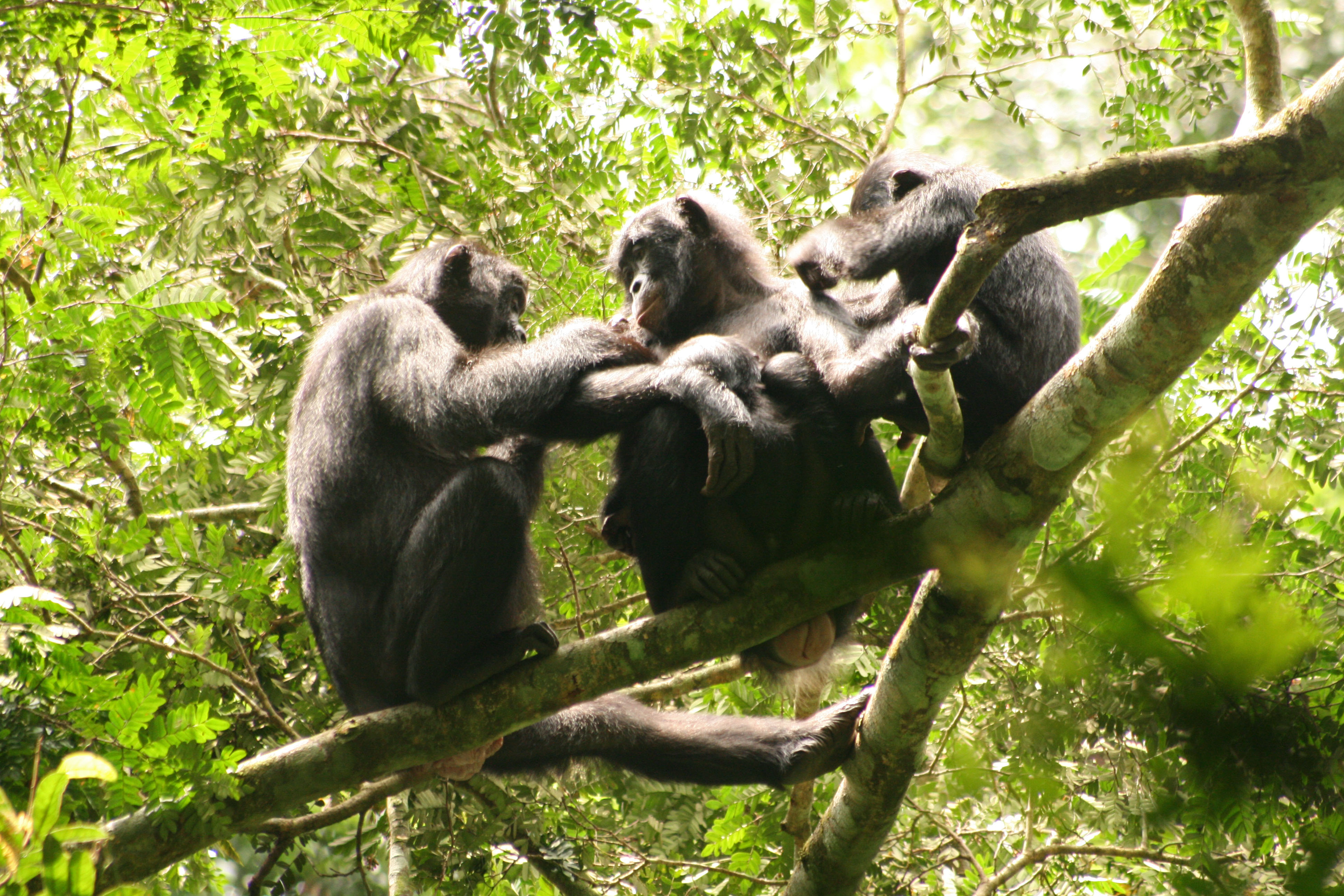
Grooming reinforces of social bonds in bonobo communities

Although aggression is present in wild bonobo societies and serious conflicts do occur, long-term field studies have not documented the sustained patterns of lethal violence observed in chimpanzee populations. Lethal inter-group violence, as observed in the chimpanzee ‘wars’, appears to be entirely absent in bonobo communities. Most within-group aggression among bonobos involve displays and mild charges; escalated conflicts and physical violence are exceptional. Aggression is often led by coalitions of females against males. Field researchers have observed only one attack in the wild that was assumed to be lethal — this involved 5 females attacking an 20-year-old male who sustained severe injuries that the researchers assumed were fatal, though they were unable to locate his body. The attack appeared to have been motivated by threatening moves the male made towards an infant while he was copulating with the infant's mother.

Researchers have also noted differences in the social functions of sexual behavior and food sharing. In bonobos, sexual interactions occur in a wider range of social contexts than in chimpanzees and have been associated with broader processes of social bonding, reconciliation after conflict, tension reduction, and alliance formation. Food sharing, even with unrelated individuals, is a common bonobo practice.

=== Humans ===
The contrasting social systems of chimpanzees and bonobos have informed discussions of human evolution. Their comparative study can help to shed light on the evolutionary origins of human social behavior. Because humans share a more distant common ancestor with both species, neither chimpanzees nor bonobos are regarded as a direct model for the behavior of early humans. However, comparison may serve “as a lens to understand which human aspects are natural rather than socially conditioned.” The similarities and differences among humans, chimpanzees, and bonobos illustrate the diversity of group dynamics that have evolved within closely related African primates.

The diversity of traits of social interaction that both species share with humans — aggression, social conflict, harmony and cooperation — suggests that these traits have at least a partial genetic basis. They can emerge “without the heavy influence of complex cultures and social norms.” These cultural markers are often thought necessary for inter-group hostility in humans, but the chimpanzee model suggests that such violence can occur in a closely related species even in their absence. Further comparative study of these three species may provide insights into “the multiple evolutionary pathways to managing social relationships.”
