= Gombe Chimpanzee War =

1974–1978 event in Tanzania

| Date | 7 January 1974 – 5 June 1978 (4 years, 4 months, 4 weeks and 1 day) |
| Location | Gombe National Park, Kigoma Region, Tanzania 4°40′S 29°38′E |
| Result | Kasakela victory: Kahama chimpanzee clan eradicated; Kasakela clan enters into conflict with Mitumba and Kalande clans |
| Territorial changes | Kasakela regain control over most of the former Kahama territory |

Belligerents
| Kahama chimpanzees | Kasakela chimpanzees |

Commanders and leaders
| Hugh (MIA); Charlie † | Figan |

Strength
| 6 males | 8 males 1 female |

Casualties and losses
| 6 killed, 4 (PKIA), 3 females beaten and reïntegrated (including non-combatants) | 1 missing and presumed dead |
- Location within Tanzania

The Gombe Chimpanzee War, also known as the Four-Year War, was a violent conflict between two communities of chimpanzees in Gombe Stream National Park in the Kigoma region of Tanzania between 1974 and 1978. The two groups were once unified in the Kasakela community. By 1974, researcher Jane Goodall noticed the community splintering. Over a span of eight months, a large party of chimpanzees separated themselves into the southern area of Kasakela and were renamed the Kahama community. The separatists consisted of six adult males, three adult females and their young. The Kasakela was left with eight adult males, twelve adult females and their young.

During the four-year conflict, all males of the Kahama community were killed, effectively disbanding the community. The victorious Kasakela then expanded into further territory but were later repelled by two other communities of chimpanzees.

== Background ==
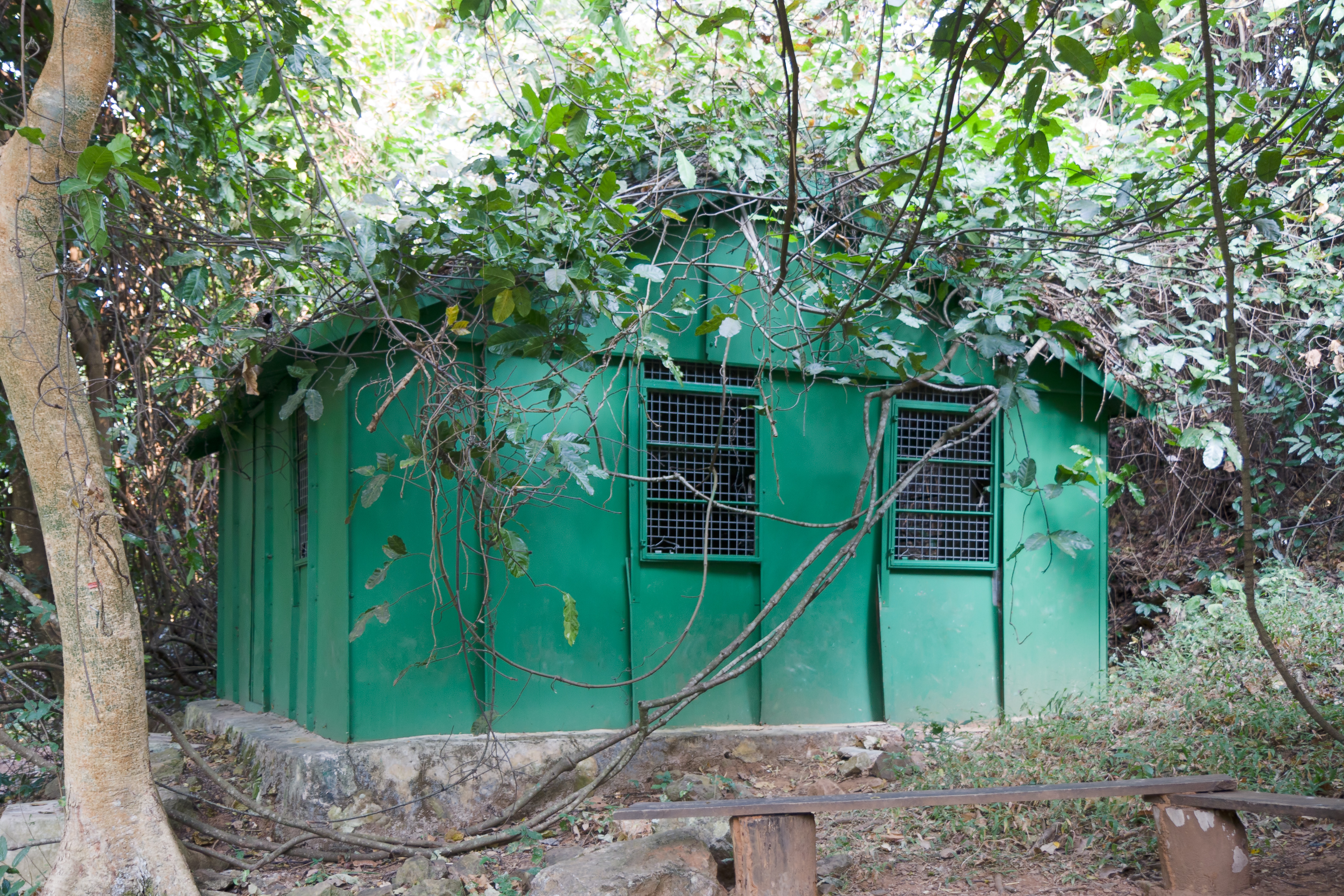
Feeding station where Goodall would feed the Gombe chimpanzees

In the years prior to the four-year war, Gombe Stream National Park was the Gombe Stream Research Centre, founded and directed by primate researcher Jane Goodall. The park is located in the lower region of the Kakombe Valley, and is known for its primate research opportunities. The site has steep slopes of open woodland rising above stream valleys lush with riverine forest.

The chimpanzees roamed across these hills in territorial communities numbering from 1-40 members. The central valley was divided into three research areas, Kasakela in the north, and Kakombe and Mkenke in the south. Goodall followed the chimpanzees in their feeding, noting their aggressive territorial behaviour. Chimpanzee males would patrol their territories and occasionally raid the areas of other communities. Violence during these patrols usually occurred against isolated females and infants; the male patrols would mostly avoid each other or, if they met in equal numbers, limit themselves to noisy shows of force instead of seeking battle. Accordingly, Goodall did not foresee the upcoming full-scale conflict between the two communities in Gombe.

The conflict began to emerge during the end of the tenure of Kasakela's long-term alpha, Mike. There were 14 adult males among the Kasakela community, and six of them increasingly spent time in the community's southern territory. Goodall and her colleagues began to refer to this section as the "southern sub-group", while the much more numerous remainder was termed the "northern sub-group". Over several months, the males of the two sub-groups reacted with increasing hostility toward each other. The northerners initially avoided the southerners' areas, whereas the southern males, led by the brothers Hugh and Charlie, made forays into northern territory. The brothers were described as "fearless" by Goodall, and the northern males generally avoided confronting them. Despite the growing tensions, some peaceful contacts between the sub-groups were maintained by two older northern males, Mike and Rodolf, with a southern male, Goliath.

Two years after the division, the factions had developed into fully separate communities. The northern faction was now considered the Kasakela community, whereas the southern faction was termed the Kahama community. At this point, the Kahama had given up the northernmost border areas of their range to the Kasakela, but the separatists still controlled an area where the Kasakela had previously "roamed at will". The two communities' patrols would make shows of force when encountering each other, though there was no open fighting. This continued for about a year. By 1974, the Kahama were still led by Hugh and Charlie, with the other males being Godi, De, Goliath, and the young Sniff. The Kasakela males, led by the newly dominant Figan, included Satan, Sherry, Evered, Rodolf, Jomeo, Mike, and Humphrey.

== War ==
First blood was drawn by the Kasakela community on 7 January 1974, when a party of six adult Kasakela males consisting of Humphrey, Figan, Jomeo, Sherry, Evered, and Rodolf ambushed the isolated Kahama male Godi while he was feeding on a tree. The Kasakela males were accompanied by one female, Gigi, who "charged back and forth around the melee". Despite Godi's attempt to flee, the attackers seized him, threw him on the ground and beat him until he stopped moving. Afterwards, the victorious chimpanzees celebrated boisterously, throwing and dragging branches with hoots and screams, and retreated. Once the Kasakela group had left, Godi stood up again, but probably died of his injuries soon after. This was the first time male chimpanzees had been seen to deliberately attempt to kill a fellow male chimpanzee.

After Godi fell, the Kasakela ambushed and maimed De. In the attack on De, the female Gigi actually fought alongside the Kasakela males. As with Godi, De was badly wounded and probably died soon after. The third Kahama victim was the elderly Goliath. Throughout the leadup to the war and its initial stage, Goliath had been relatively friendly with the Kasakela neighbors when encounters occurred. However, his kindness was no longer reciprocated when a Kasakela patrol consisting of Figan, Faben, Humphrey, Satan, and Jomeo ambushed him. The researcher who observed this attack was shocked by the brutality and fury displayed by the Kasakela group, with Faben twisting Goliath's leg as if he was trying to tear it off. The elderly chimpanzee probably died soon after the attack. Around this point, Hugh also vanished, with Goodall assuming that he too had been killed by the Kasakela. This left only three Kahama males; Charlie, Sniff, and Willy Wally, who was crippled from polio. In 1975, Faben disappeared despite previously appearing healthy; Goodall suspected that he had been killed, though anthropologist R. Brian Ferguson cautioned that the disappearance of chimpanzee males was not unusual even in peaceful times.

Charlie was the next victim among the Kahama. His death was not directly observed, but fishermen reported hearing "sounds of fierce conflict"; three days later, his corpse was found with "terrible injuries" at the Kahama Stream. Next, the Kasakela chimpanzees attacked an elderly Kahama female, Madam Bee; she died four days later. After Charlie's death, Willy Wally disappeared and was never found. The last remaining Kahama male, Sniff, survived for over a year. For some time it seemed as if he might escape into a new community or be welcomed back to the Kasakelas, but this did not occur. Sniff, too, was killed by the Kasakela war band. Of the females from Kahama, one was killed, two went missing, and three were beaten and kidnapped by the Kasakela males. Conversely, Ferguson argued that at least some of the missing Kahama may have survived the war by escaping the Gombe area, as the Kahama community had friendly contacts with an unstudied chimpanzee community to the east who could have accepted them into their ranks.

The Kasakela thus succeeded in taking over the Kahama's former territory, and spent the time after their victory moving through and feeding in this area. Temporarily, the community's territory increased from 12 to over 15 square kilometres (5.8 mi^{2}).

== Aftermath ==
These territorial gains were not permanent, however. With the Kahama gone, the Kasakela territory now butted up directly against the territory of the Kalande chimpanzee community. Goodall reasoned that the Kahama had functioned as a buffer, and the Kalande now began expanding northward into Kasakela areas. Cowed by the superior strength and numbers of the Kalande, as well as a few violent skirmishes along their border, the Kasakela quickly gave up much of their new territory. They also lost at least two males, Humphrey and Sherry, presumably killed by the Kalande. Furthermore, when the Kasakela group moved back northward, they were harassed by foragers of the Mitumba chimpanzee community, who also outnumbered the Kasakela. Beset from north and south, the Kasakela territory shrank to 5 square kilometres (1.9 mi^{2}) by 1981, barely sufficient to feed them.

In 1982, Kalande and Mitumba males invaded the Kasakela core area, and began to interact with each other. The Kasakela community's complete collapse was averted by their unusual number of young males growing up at the time. Though they were neither strong nor experienced enough to actually fight the Kalande and Mitumba, their noisy displays alongside the older males succeeded in intimidating their rivals, and the Kasakela regained some territory. Eventually, hostilities died down, restoring the status quo ante.

According to Ferguson, it is possible that the Gombe Chimpanzee War contributed to transgenerational violence, specifically in the case of Frodo, a later alpha male of the Kasakela chimpanzees who was known for his exceptional aggression. Frodo was born in early 1976 and spent his first years experiencing the Four-Year War and a simultaneous "infanticide streak" by two Kasakela females. As a teenager, he witnessed the violent overthrow and group beating of an alpha male, Goblin. Ferguson further pointed out that almost all of the severe attacks by Kasakela males on other chimpanzee communities over the next decades were carried out by eight males, including Frodo, who had been born between 1971 and 1979.

== Effects on Goodall ==
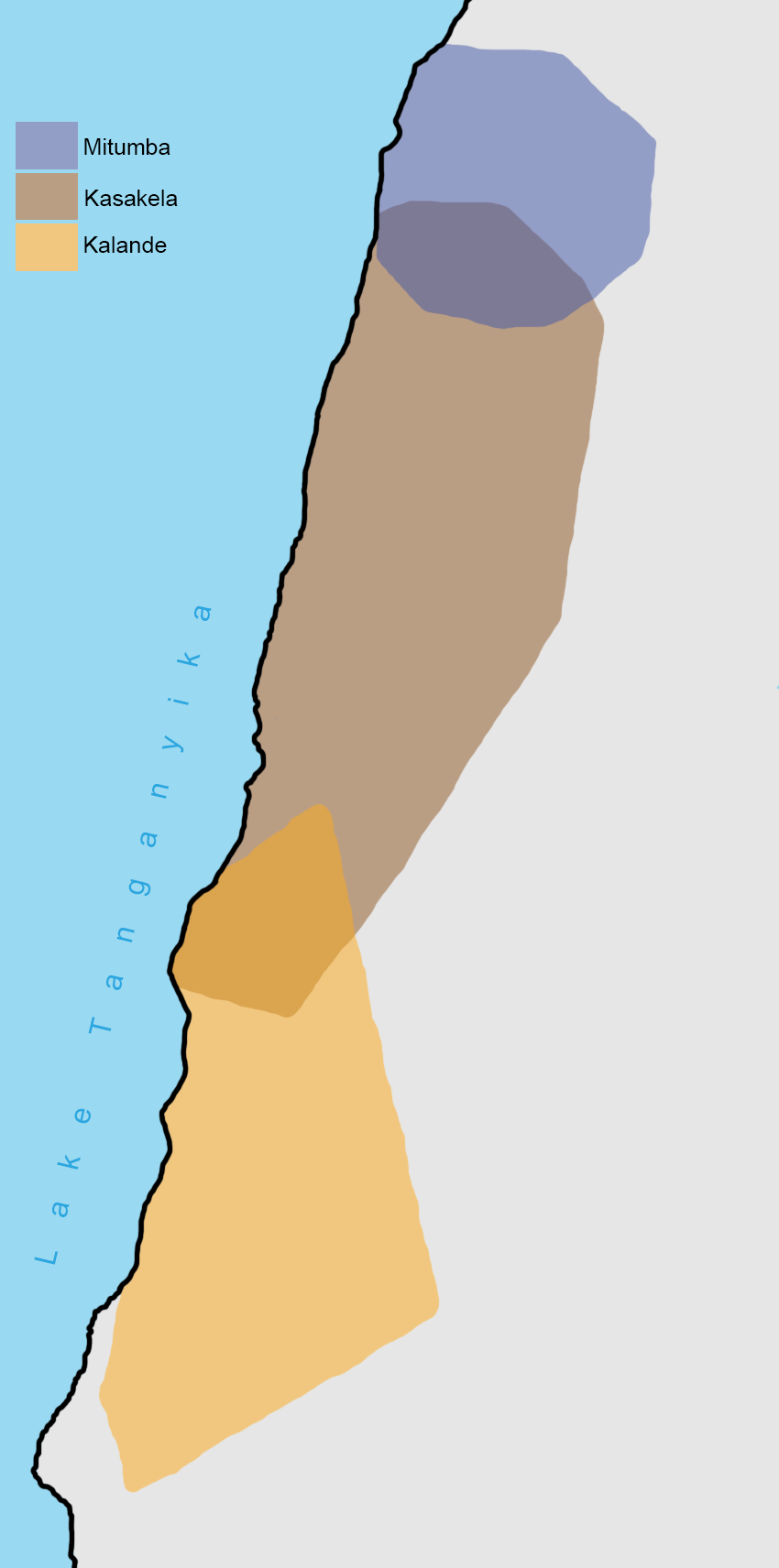
Gombe chimpanzee populations in 2007

Jane Goodall was known for her research on chimpanzees. The outbreak of the war shocked her, as she had previously considered chimpanzees to be, although similar to human beings, "rather 'nicer'". Coupled with her 1975 observation of cannibalistic infanticide by a high-ranking female in the community, the Gombe war revealed the "dark side" of chimpanzee behaviour. In her 1990 memoir Through a Window: My Thirty Years with the Chimpanzees of Gombe, she wrote:

For several years I struggled to come to terms with this new knowledge. Often when I woke in the night, horrific pictures sprang unbidden to my mind—Satan [one of the apes], cupping his hand below Sniff's chin to drink the blood that welled from a great wound on his face; old Rodolf, usually so benign, standing upright to hurl a four-pound [1.8 kg] rock at Godi's prostrate body; Jomeo tearing a strip of skin from Dé's thigh; Figan, charging and hitting, again and again, the stricken, quivering body of Goliath, one of his childhood heroes.

== Legacy ==
When Goodall reported on the events of the Gombe War, her account of a naturally occurring war between chimpanzees was not universally believed. At the time, scientific models of human and animal behaviour virtually never overlapped. Some scientists accused her of excessive anthropomorphism; others suggested that her presence, and her practice of feeding the chimpanzees, had created violent conflict in a naturally peaceful society. However, later research using less intrusive methods confirmed that chimpanzee societies, in their natural state, indeed wage war. A 2018 study published in the American Journal of Physical Anthropology concluded that the Gombe War was most likely a consequence of a power struggle between three high-ranking males, which was exacerbated by an unusual scarcity of fertile females. Conversely, some research has suggested that the casualties of the war may have been smaller than initially reported, as a leopard had been active in Gombe at the time of the war and might have taken some of the missing chimpanzees. Later research also revealed that violence was generally more common within chimpanzee communities than between different groups. From 2015, scientists also observed the unusually brutal Ngogo Chimpanzee War, when the Ngogo chimpanzee community fractured into two factions, resulting in years-long fighting and at least 28 deaths by 2026.

In literature, the Gombe Chimpanzee War became the topic of a philosophical poem "The First Civil War in Gombe 1974–1978" by Katarzyna Zechenter, a Polish poet, where the speaking persona concludes: "Still, I don't understand, were these chimps so human, or are we such animals?"

== See also ==
- Killer ape theory, proposed by Raymond Dart in 1953
- Ngogo chimpanzee war
- Chimpanzee violence

== Bibliography ==
- Ferguson, R. Brian (2023). Chimpanzees, War, and History: Are Men Born to Kill?. Oxford University Press. ISBN 978-0197506752.
- Frankenberry, Nancy K. (2008). The Faith of Scientists: In Their Own Words. Princeton University Press. ISBN 978-0691134871.
- Goodall, Jane (2010) [1st pub. 1990]. Through a Window: My Thirty Years with the Chimpanzees of Gombe. Houghton Mifflin Harcourt. ISBN 978-0547488387.
- Morris, Ian (2014). War! What Is It Good For?: The Role of Conflict and the Progress of Civilisation from Primates to Robots. Macmillan. ISBN 978-1847654540.
