= Four Years' War =

The Four Years' War may refer to:

- The Four Years' War (307-303 BC) between Athens and Macedon under Cassander
- Italian War of 1521–1526
- King George's War (1744–1748)
- Gombe Chimpanzee War (1974-1978)
