= Kahama chimpanzee community =

Former Tanzanian community of eastern chimpanzees

The Kahama chimpanzee community was a habituated community of eastern chimpanzees that lived in Gombe National Park near Lake Tanganyika in Tanzania. The community was dismantled after the events of the Gombe Chimpanzee War.

== See also ==
- Kasakela chimpanzee community
- Gombe Chimpanzee War – 1974–1978 event in Tanzania
