= Toshisada Nishida =

Professor Toshisada Nishida
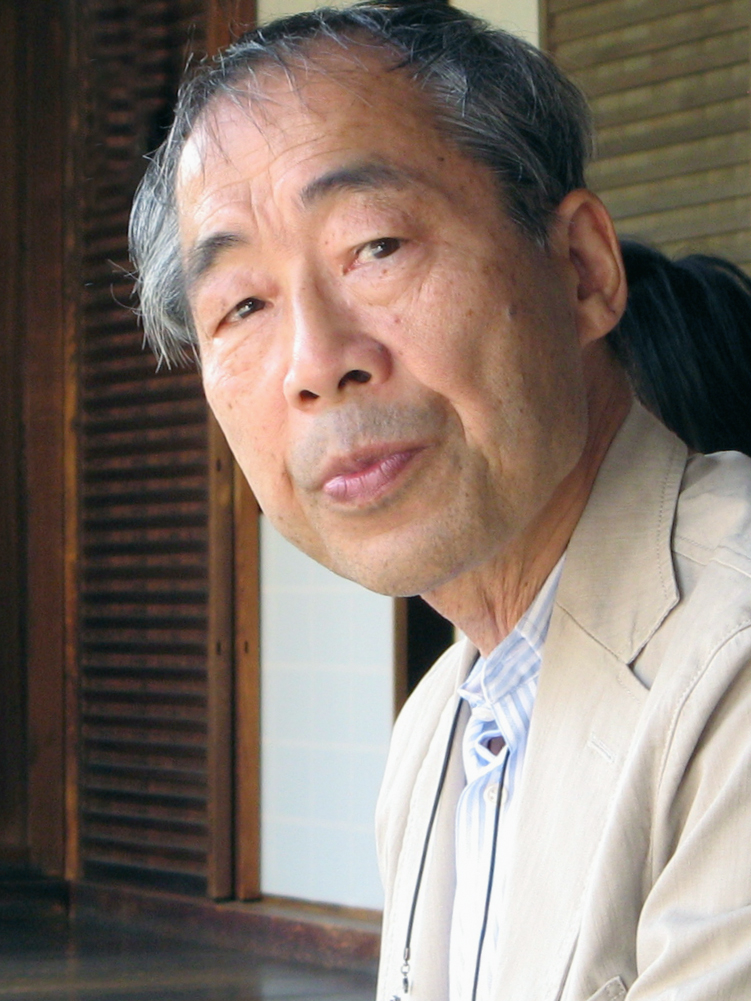
- Toshisada Nishida (Photo: Frans de Waal, 2007)
- Born: 3 March 1941; Japan
- Died: 7 June 2011 (aged 70)
- Scientific career
- Fields: Zoology, Zoopharmacognosy, Primatology
- Workplaces: Kyoto University; International Primatological Society

Toshisada Nishida (3 March 1941 – 7 June 2011) was a Japanese primatologist who established one of the first long term chimpanzee field research sites. He was the first to discover that chimpanzees, instead of forming nuclear family-like arrangements, live a communal life with territorial boundaries. His discoveries of the medicinal use of plants by wild chimpanzees helped form the basis of the field of zoopharmacognosy.

Nishida was a full professor of Zoology at Kyoto University, the President of the Primate Society of Japan, the President of the International Primatological Society, and the Editor-in-Chief of the journal Primates. In 2008, he was a recipient of the Leakey Prize for his accomplishments in human evolutionary science.

== Scientific career ==
=== Early career ===
As a graduate student, Toshisada Nishida studied primatology at Kyoto University under Junichiro Itani, a successor of Japanese primatologist Kinji Imanishi. Nishida studied Japanese macaques with Imanishi from 1963 to 1965 before traveling to Tanzania to study chimpanzees.

=== Chimpanzee research ===
Despite being more genetically distant from humans than chimpanzees, in the 1960s baboons were considered the best model of human evolution as they had descended from the trees to become savanna-dwellers as early humans did. However, baboons did not possess many of the characteristics deemed important for human evolution, such as tool technology, cooperative hunting, food sharing, territoriality, cultural traditions, and certain cognitive capacities, such as planning and theory-of-mind. Chimpanzees, however, show all characteristics.

Early primatologists had observed chimpanzees traveling through trees, eating fruits at their leisure, but rarely noted anything of interest in their behaviour. In the 1960s, there were only two field sites studying chimpanzee behaviour: one led by Jane Goodall in the Gombe Stream, and another located in the foothills of the Mahale Mountains at Lake Tanganyika, which was staffed by Japanese scientists and led by Nishida. Nishida's team planted sugarcane to attract the chimpanzees, who began to consistently visit the site after only six months. Based on his field observations, Nishida defended his dissertation at Kyoto University in 1968.

==== Discoveries regarding chimpanzees ====
"Chimpanzees are always new to me."

— Toshisada Nishida

During Nishida's first visit to Mahale, he observed chimpanzees living in communities with territorial boundaries, noting the existence of hostility between neighbouring groups. As chimpanzees are often encountered alone or in small groups in the forest, and due to the difficulty of determining community relations between chimpanzees, this challenged the existing scientific belief that chimpanzees lived in nuclear family-like groups.

At the Mahale site, scientists followed Kinji Imanishi's methods to identify and name individual chimpanzees, following them over a long period of time in order to understand relationships within the community. The Mahale scientists habituated themselves to the chimpanzees through food provisioning: first with sugar cane, and later with bananas. Nishida developed a "mobile provisioning" technique in which a random site was chosen to distribute food, then scientists would announce their presence by imitating the chimpanzees' hooting calls, allowing the apes to approach and obtain food. As the scientists never used a fixed feeding site, the chimpanzees normal roaming patterns remained intact.

Since the 1960s, the Mahale field site has been important to chimpanzee research. There, scientists have learned that chimpanzees medicate themselves with plants, that they have complex tool skills that differ from group to group, they hunt and eat meat, they raid neighbouring territories, and that males engage in power politics while competing over status and females.

In 1982, at the same time that Frans de Waal wrote Chimpanzee Politics on apes in captivity, Nishida and his students were documenting very similar power struggles among wild chimpanzees, including one by a male named Kalunde. Kalunde played a game that Nishida called "allegiance-fickleness", which allows elderly males to maintain a key position in the group by regularly switching sides in alliances with younger males.

==== Cultural differences in chimpanzees ====
Nishida collaborated frequently with Western scientists. In 1975, he invited William McGrew and Caroline Tutin, primatologists familiar with the chimpanzees at Gombe National Park, to Mahale. They had no reason to expect major behavioural differences in the same subspecies of chimpanzee with the same ecology; however, McGrew and Tutin observed the Mahale chimpanzees frequently engaging in handclasp grooming, a behavior that had not been observed in the Gombe chimpanzees. Based on their visit, McGrew and Tutin were the first to seriously question the assumption of "typical" chimpanzee behaviour, an important step towards culture studies on the great apes.

==== Zoopharcognosy ====
While at the Mahale site in the early 1970s, Nishida observed wild chimpanzees consuming Aspilia leaves, which have no nutritional value and are not digested. He noticed the chimpanzees consuming them very slowly in the morning, swallowing the leaves without chewing. Nishida, along with primatologist Richard Wrangham, published their observations of the potentially medicinal use of plants by wild chimpanzees in 1971. De Waal believes that this paper, along with later studies conducted on self-medication among animals, became the foundations of the field of zoopharmacognosy, or the study of self-medication by animals through the ingestion of plants, insects, or soils.

=== Published works ===
Nishida was listed as the first author or editor on 17 books and volumes, two of which were in English. His body of work, which featured some of the first papers published in English by Japanese primatologists, (Note: a complete list can be found in Yamagiwa, J. (2011), "Professor Toshisada Nishida (1941-2011)", Primates, 52 (3): 291–300, doi:10.1007/s10329-011-0261-7, PMID 21961138, S2CID 20095533) often featured great attention to detail, resulting in comprehensive catalogues of behaviour patterns. His final book, Chimpanzees of the Lakeshore, was published posthumously in 2012 by Cambridge University Press.

== Conservation work ==
Nishida was a patron of the United Nations Environment Programme's Great Ape Survival project, and worked with UNESCO in an attempt to establish the great apes as a "World Heritage Species". In 1985, he successfully lobbied the Tanzanian government to protect the Mahale Mountains, forming the Mahale Mountains National Park. In 1994, he founded the Mahale Wildlife Conservation Society.

== Recognition ==
In 2008, Toshisada Nishida and primatologist Jane Goodall were made co-recipients of Leakey Prize, which recognizes accomplishments in human evolutionary science. That year, Nishida also received the International Primatological Society lifetime achievement award.

== Retirement and death ==
In March 2004, Nishida retired from Kyoto University. De Waal, who attended his lectures often, stated that they were "riveting, especially given the historical details of how our knowledge has grown over the years and the critical role Japanese scientists have played in modern primatology".

After his retirement, Nishida stayed focused on primatology and chimpanzee conservation. In 2004, he became Director of the Japan Monkey Centre, serving as Editor-in-Chief of its journal, Primates, until his death. He made his last field trip to Mahale in the summer of 2009. In 2011, Nishida asked two of his colleagues to ensure the Mahale project would continue for at least another century. Nishida died from cancer later that year, in June 2011.

== See also ==
- Chimpanzee violence
