= Kasakela chimpanzee community =

Community of wild eastern chimpanzees in Tanzania

The Kasekela chimpanzee community (formerly spelled Kasakela) is a habituated community of wild eastern chimpanzees that lives in Gombe National Park near Lake Tanganyika in Tanzania. The community was the subject of Jane Goodall's pioneering study that began in 1960, and studies have continued ever since, becoming the longest continuous study of any animals in their natural habitat. As a result, the community has been instrumental in the study of chimpanzees and has been popularized in several books and documentaries. The community's popularity was enhanced by Goodall's practice of giving names to the chimpanzees she was observing, in contrast to the typical scientific practice of identifying the subjects by number. Goodall generally used a naming convention in which infants were given names starting with the same letter as their mother, allowing the recognition of matrilineal lines.

One of the most important discoveries that was learned by observing the Kasekela chimpanzee community was the use of tools. On 4 November 1960, Goodall observed a chimpanzee that she had named David Greybeard using a grass stalk as a tool to extract termites from a termite hill. Later, she observed David Greybeard and another chimpanzee named Goliath stripping leaves off twigs to create termite fishing tools. Previously, tool use in chimpanzees was only rarely observed, and tool creation by non-human animals had never been observed. Until then, tool making was considered one of the defining characteristics of being human. Another important observation occurred a few days earlier, on 30 October 1960. On that day Goodall observed the community's chimpanzees eating meat, dispelling the notion that chimpanzees are vegetarians. A third observation by Goodall in the early 1960s was that male chimpanzees perform a "rain dance," charging, calling, slapping the ground and trees and dragging branches in the rain. In the early 1970s the chimpanzees of the community were observed to engage in ongoing coordinated attacks against the chimpanzees of the neighbouring Kahama Chimpanzee Community, ultimately wiping it out. According to historian Ian Morris, this "Four Year War" represented the first time scientists had observed chimpanzees "deliberately seek out, attack and leave for dead" chimps from another community, and it has been described as "the first record of lasting 'warfare' among [non-human] primates."

Several families within the Kasekela chimpanzee community have been particularly prominent in books and documentaries. The F-family has produced five alpha males for the community, and the matriarch, Flo, played a particularly important role in acknowledging Goodall's acceptance as a human observer by the community. The G-family has produced at least one alpha male, and also the birth of several twins, which are rare among chimpanzees. There are other families as well which include the T-family and S-family (which has produced one alpha male).

== F-family ==
=== Flo ===
Flo (c. 1919 – 1972) was the matriarch of the F-family, so named because she and all her matrilineal descendants were given names beginning with the letter "F". In 1962, Flo was one of the first chimpanzees to approach Goodall's camp, along with her infant daughter Fifi. Video of Flo approaching Goodall and allowing Fifi to reach out to touch Goodall's forehead, letting Goodall know she had been accepted, is shown in the IMAX film Jane Goodall's Wild Chimpanzees. Later she brought her sons Figan and Faben, who would later become prominent members of the community to the camp, and when she came into estrus in 1963 she attracted the community's males to Goodall's camp.

From the time Dr. Jane Goodall first observed her, Flo appeared to be the highest-ranking female in the whole Kasekela chimp community, who, although portrayed as an affectionate, playful and tolerant individual when interacting with her offspring, did not hesitate to aggressively dominate other females. She was a successful mother and fierce defender of her offspring, all of whom grew up with self-confidence because of her dominant status. Fifi, raised by her confident mother Flo, grew to be a popular female in Gombe, not only because of her high-ranking family but also from her close ties with the adult males. She inherited her mother's superior status and because her older brothers Faben and Figan were among the top big males, she grew up with enormous confidence. Flo had at least five known offspring, three sons (Faben, Figan and Flint) and two daughters (Fifi and Flame). Flo was 28 years old when she gave birth to Faben. Most female chimpanzees have their first infant when 12–14 years of age, so it is possible that Flo had at least one infant prior to Faben that either died or, if it was a female, would have transferred to one of the other communities prior to Goodall's arrival to Gombe in 1960. When Flo died in 1972, she was given an obituary in Britain's Sunday Times. Flo's descendants make up a third of the Kasekela chimpanzee community, with individuals that have risen to power over the years. Her daughter Fifi reigned supreme after her and produced more offspring than any other female in Gombe history until 2004. Her grandsons, Freud, Frodo and Ferdinand were alpha males in the community, which as of 2025, is headed by her great-grandson, Fudge.

=== Faben ===
Faben (c.1947 – 1975) was Flo's oldest known offspring. He was a powerful male, but lost the use of one arm in a polio epidemic that ravaged the community in 1966. Despite his disability, he learned to create spectacular bipedal charging displays, which allowed him to regain a high rank within the community. His support was critical to Humphrey's ascension to alpha male rank in 1969, and to his brother Figan's ascension to alpha male in 1972. Faben also participated in the conflicts with the rival Kahama community (which was formed by former Kasekela members) that occurred between 1973 and 1975, and was a leader in the killing of several Kahama males, including former Kasekela alpha male Goliath. Faben himself died in 1975, possibly as a result of further conflicts with the Kahama community. Following Faben's death, Figan had difficulty maintaining his alpha male position for several months and eventually lost his alpha status to Goblin.

=== Figan ===
Figan (c.1953 – 1982) was Flo's second son. Goodall considered him to be Gombe's most intelligent chimpanzee. Although younger than Faben, he was able to dominate his older brother after Faben's arm was paralysed from polio in 1966. With Faben's support, Figan was able to become alpha male in 1972 by defeating the prior alpha Humphrey and an older competitor Evered. At this time, Goodall described him as the most powerful alpha male in Gombe’s recorded history. After Faben's death in 1975, Figan lost his unquestioned alpha status, in that he could be dominated by a coalition of males, but remained the top-ranked male. By 1977, he had regained his alpha status by forging alliances with other males, including his predecessor Humphrey. In 1979, he was toppled from his alpha status by 15-year-old Goblin, whom he had previously supported, but regained his alpha status once again by forging alliances with other males. Although a powerful male, Figan's ability to make alliances with other males was instrumental to allow him to hold on to his alpha status. In 1982, Goblin unseated him again, and Figan disappeared and presumably died a few months later, although when last seen he appeared to be in good health. Although Figan was the alpha male for several years, he is not known for certain to have sired any infants, although he is likely the father of a few.

=== Fifi ===
Fifi (c.1958 – 2004) was Flo's oldest daughter. Fifi benefited from her high-ranking family, and ascended to the top of the female hierarchy in her community. Fifi had nine infants, seven of whom survived to independence. Her two oldest sons, Freud and Frodo, both have become the community's alpha male, as did another son, Ferdinand. One of her other sons, Faustino, also attained high rank. Her three surviving daughters were Fanni, Flossi and Flirt. She also had one son, Fred (1996–1997) and one daughter, Furaha (2002–2004) who died in infancy. Fred was fathered by one of Fifi's other sons, Frodo. Five-year-old Fifi was the focal point of the documentary People of the Forest: The Chimps of Gombe, in which her mother and siblings also featured, attempting to gain access to her infant brother Flint. All four of Fifi's surviving sons had all held the alpha and/or beta positions in the community. Grandson Fudge (by Fanni) also attained alpha male status. Late in Frodo's reign as alpha male, Fifi helped defend him against attacks and she suffered some injuries in the process.

Although males are perceived as the more aggressive sex in chimpanzees, studies at Gombe have revealed that aggression among females with each other does indeed occur. One of two contexts for female-female aggressive encounters in Gombe was the presence of newborn infants. Fifi grew to be a formidable female who, although a very successful mother herself, was observed to have carried out ferocious and infanticidal attacks on other, lower-ranking females in her community. Such attacks were observed of Fifi and her adult daughter, Fanni, aggressively harassing fellow Kasekela female, Gremlin, on three different occasions; the first being in 1993 following the birth of her daughter Gaia, and then five years later following the birth of her twins. This was followed by another attack on Gremlin six years later following the birth of her next baby. Researchers could only speculate that the attacks on infants of other females had to do with food competition, as each female strives to secure resources for her own group of offspring and thus the expansion of another female's family unit could deplete resources. The attacks by Fifi and Fanni mirror those of previous perpetrators Passion and Pom in the 1970s, which proved that cannibalism, though deemed rare, does occur among both male and female chimpanzees.

In 2004, Fifi, who was by then 46 years old which made her the oldest living chimpanzee in the Kasekela community at that point in time, disappeared in September with her youngest and ninth offspring, two year old daughter Furaha. During that year she shifted her range to the far north of the Kasekela community territory, and the simultaneous advancement of the neighbouring Mitumba community further south nearing the Kasekela territory border suggests that Fifi and her youngster may have been fatally attacked by the Mitumba territorial males. A female chimpanzee leaving the safety of her community territory poses risks, particularly if she has a vulnerable youngster. Studies on chimpanzee intercommunity relations revealed that chimpanzees are likely to be attacked by the territorial males of a rival community, and the intensity of the attacks depends on the gender of the intruder, and if the stranger is female, it depends on whether or not they are of any reproductive benefit to the males. Young, cycling females are often spared an attack because they are deemed to be potential new mates, but a lactating mother with a young infant is considered of very little use for the males, which results in lethal aggression and fatality. The bodies of Fifi and Furaha were never found, but the confirmed death of fellow Kasekela female, Patti, in 2005, by neighbouring Mitumba community males provides a near definitive conclusion of the fate that befell Fifi and her youngster.

=== Flint ===
Flint (1964–1972) was Flo's third son, and her first infant born after Goodall began observing the community. Goodall had intended that Flint become the first wild chimpanzee to have his life documented from birth to death. Flint had difficulty weaning, and became distraught and angry when the birth of his sister Flame displaced him as Flo's baby. After Flame disappeared, possibly by the hand of Flint, he regained his enthusiasm, but resumed his needy, infantlike behaviour. After his nephew Freud was born, Flint became fascinated with the new infant and became an important influence of Freud's first year of life. Following the death of his mother Flo in 1972, Flint became depressed and ill; he died about three weeks after her.

=== Flame ===
Flame (1968–1969) was Flo's daughter. Flo's son Flint, at age four, threw violent fits in order to suckle his mother's breast while newborn Flame was in Flo's arms. Flame disappeared shortly after she was born; there has been speculation she may have been killed by her jealous brother Flint.

=== Freud ===
Freud (May 1971 – March 2014) was Fifi's oldest son. His father was a male from outside the Kasekela community. As a juvenile, he benefited from a high-ranking mother and an uncle, Figan, who was the alpha male. In 1993, Freud became the alpha male by unseating his childhood playmate Wilkie. While the alpha male, his younger but larger brother Frodo became the second highest-ranking male in the community. In 1997, while Freud was afflicted by sarcoptic mange, Frodo was able to take over the alpha status. After losing his alpha status, Freud settled into a role as a middle-ranking male, although could still threaten higher-ranking males when aroused. He was also able to serve as an important ally to other males.

Although less aggressive than his brother Frodo, Freud is known to have engaged in at least one instance of infanticide, killing a Kasekela infant named Tofiki in 2004. In his old age, his younger brothers sometimes provided him support, such as sharing meat and honey with him. The documentary Chimpanzee Family Fortunes ends with a scene of the orphaned young female Flirt finding solace after several lonely months by getting groomed by her older brother Freud. He fathered at least one infant, the female Cocoa to Candy, born in 2004. Freud's approach to maintaining his alpha status was different from his smaller predecessor Wilkie and his larger successor Frodo. At 99 pounds (45 kg), Freud was larger than the 81-pound (37-kilogramme) Wilkie and smaller than the 113-pound (51-kilogramme) Frodo. Freud was less aggressive than and groomed other males to help maintain alliances more often than Frodo, but engaged in more contact aggression and less grooming than Wilkie. While alpha male he was able to intimidate even the larger Frodo with his displays.

Freud died in March 2014, at more than 42 years old, which made him the oldest male whose age was known in the history of the community. Freud was one of the first wild chimpanzees whose entire life from birth to old age was documented by researchers.

=== Frodo ===
Frodo (30 June 1976 – 10 November 2013) was Fifi's second-oldest son. His father was the relatively low-ranking male Sherry. Even from a young age, Frodo was unusually large and aggressive. He learned to throw rocks as a juvenile and became very accurate with his aim; he sometimes threw them at his human observers, often hitting and bruising them. As an adult, he was one of the largest chimpanzees ever observed in the community, at about 113 pounds (51 kg) and remained quite aggressive. He also became an excellent hunter of red colobus monkeys, and was also able to intimidate other chimpanzees into sharing their kills with him if he was unsuccessful. From 1990 to 1995, Frodo killed 10% of the red colobus monkeys within his home range. His large size and aggressive nature allowed him to attain high status in the group, while his brother Freud was alpha male. On 2 October 1997, while Freud and other community members were suffering from sarcoptic mange, Frodo attacked and defeated Freud, thus attaining the alpha male position. Researchers speculated that Frodo was unaffected by the mange because he interacted less with the other apes, giving the parasite less opportunity to infect him. After taking over the alpha male position, Frodo demonstrated his new power by protecting his vanquished brother from the other males; typically the former alpha is attacked by the other males and forced to leave the community for a period of time.

As alpha male, Frodo maintained his position largely through intimidation. He rarely groomed other males, and often demanded that other males groom him. Frodo remained alpha male until becoming ill himself in 2002; he was then defeated by a coalition of several males and spent most of the next two years alone, recovering from his wounds and illness. He received antibiotics from the researchers, which likely helped his recovery. In 2004, he once again began travelling with the rest of the community, but was unable to re-establish his alpha status. In his later years, Frodo mellowed. He became less aggressive and spent much time by himself, although he could still intimidate other chimpanzees on occasion. Frodo died in 2013.

Frodo's aggression was not limited to colobus monkeys and other chimpanzees. In May 2002, he killed a 14-month-old human child that the niece of a member of the research team had carried into his territory. As a result, the Tanzanian National Parks Department considered killing Frodo. In 1988, he attacked visiting Far Side cartoonist Gary Larson, leaving him bruised and scratched. Frodo had a history of attacking the researchers observing him; Goodall was attacked by Frodo on multiple occasions and, in 1989, the ape beat her head so violently her neck was nearly broken.

Frodo fathered at least eight infants, second only to group male Wilkie, who fathered ten. Infants he fathered included:

- Zeus (1993– ), by Trezia. Zeus was part of a coalition that helped topple his uncle Ferdinand from alpha male status.
- Titan (1994– ), a large, aggressive adolescent male by Patti
- Fred (1996–1997), by Fifi, Frodo's own mother
- Golden and Glitter (1998– ), female twins and the oldest chimpanzee twins known to have survived in the wild, by Gremlin
- Tarzan (1999– ), Titan's brother by Patti
- Samwise (2001– ), an aggressive female by Sandi
- Sinbad (2001– ), Sparrow's youngest son

=== Fanni ===
Fanni (b. 19 March 1981) is Fifi's oldest daughter. Her father was Goblin. She had her first infant, Fax, at just 11 years old, making her one of the youngest mothers seen in the community. Her infant, Fax, was given that name because of the continuous messages about his birth that Dr. Jane Goodall was receiving from her fax machine. Unfortunately, Fax did not survive to adulthood. She has also had five other children, males Fudge (1996– ), Fundi (2000– ), Fifty (2010– ) and Ficma (2015–) and females Familia (2004– ) and Fadhila (2007– ). Fudge, Fundi and Familia were fathered by Sheldon, who would later become alpha male. Familia disappeared in 2012. Fadhila was fathered by Wilkie, another former alpha male. Fifty was also sired by Wilkie. As of 2021, Fudge is the alpha male of the community.

Whilst most female chimpanzees leave their natal communities upon reaching sexual maturity, Fanni has remained in her natal Kasekela community alongside her mother (in contrast to her younger sister Flossi). Fanni remained close to her mother Fifi, with whom she formed a close alliance against the other community females. Although males are perceived as the more aggressive sex in chimpanzees, studies at Gombe have revealed that there is substantial aggression among females with each other. One of two contexts for female-female aggressive encounters in Gombe was the presence of newborn infants. Fifi and Fanni were a formidable force and they carried out infanticidal attacks on other, lower-ranking females in her community. Such attacks were observed on fellow Kasekela female, Gremlin, on three different occasions; the first being in 1993 following the birth of her daughter Gaia, and then five years later following the birth of her twins. This was followed by another attack on Gremlin six years later following the birth of her next baby. Researchers could only speculate that the attacks on infants of other females had to do with food competition, as each female strives to secure resources for her own group of offspring and thus the expansion of another female's family unit could deplete resources. The attacks by Fifi and Fanni mirror those of previous perpetrators Passion and Pom in the 1970s, which proved that cannibalism, although deemed rare, does occur among both male and female chimpanzees.

The loss of her mother in 2004 greatly reduced Fanni's dominance and she shifted her range to the southern part of the Kasekela territory, further away from the other community females.

=== Flossi ===
Flossi (b. 8 February 1985) is Fifi's second-oldest daughter. Her father was Goblin. Unlike most other female chimpanzees in the F-family, upon reaching adulthood she emigrated from the Kasekela community to join the neighbouring Mitumba Chimpanzee Community in 1996, although her younger sister Flirt (who was born after Flossi emigrated) later joined her. Although it is typical for female chimpanzees to emigrate from their natal group upon reaching maturity, within the Kasekela community only about half the females do so. Flossi may have chosen to emigrate to avoid mating attempts from her brother Frodo. Before emigrating from the Kasekela community, Flossi may have innovated the practice of fishing for ants to eat using a stick, which had not been observed before within the Kasekela community (although fishing for termites had been) but soon after the practice spread throughout the community. Flossi has given birth to four offspring, the males Forest (1997– ) and Fansi (2001– ) and the females Flower (2005– ), and Falida (2009– ). Flossi became a high ranking female within the Mitumba community; more typically immigrating females remain at a low rank.

=== Faustino ===
Faustino (b. 8 May 1989) is Fifi's third oldest son. His father was brother Freud's rival Wilkie. At the beginning of the documentary Chimps: So Like Us, the infant Faustino is shown with mother Fifi and sister Flossi trying out facial expressions. Fifi became pregnant less than three years after Faustino was born, an unusually short time for a chimpanzee. As a result, Faustino had to be weaned at an unusually young age, leading to a particularly difficult weaning conflict. This may account for Faustino being more skittish as a juvenile than his younger brother.

Faustino grew into a large but mellow adult who reminded observers of Freud. He had worked his way up to become the beta, or second highest-ranking, male in the community until struck by a near fatal disease in 2005. Although Faustino survived, he lost his high rank. After recovering, Faustino slowly climbed his way back up the hierarchy, but it appears he will never become alpha male. However, he did help his younger brother Ferdinand attain alpha status in 2008, and continued to provide important support for Ferdinand in his brother's role as alpha, although as of early 2014 he would sometimes ally himself with Ferdinand's potential rival Titan. He is the father of Gaia's son Google, born in 2010.

=== Ferdinand ===
Ferdinand (b. 19 August 1992) is Fifi's fourth oldest son. His father was his uncle Figan's rival Evered, who was 41 years old when Ferdinand was conceived. He became the first wild great ape to have his birth recorded. By 2007, he had grown into a large enough male to wound the alpha male Kris, and researchers believed he would eventually become the third of Fifi's sons to become alpha male. In 2008, he succeeded in supplanting Kris as alpha male, after wounding Kris badly in a fight. Ferdinand maintained his alpha male position primarily through intimidation and threats and even surprising attacking males. He would bite rivals on the back to leave a scar. By the last two years of his reign Ferdinand's aggressiveness had made him so unpopular with other group males that he spent most of his time apart from them, returning to assert his dominance every so often. During that time a coalition of rival males formed that included his nephews Fudge and Fundi, and their father and uncle Sheldon and Sampson, and another nephew Zeus. In October 2016 the coalition attacked Ferdinand when he made one of his occasional appearances to try to assert his continuing dominance. Fudge and Fundi led the attack, with some support from their mother (and Ferdinand's sister) Fanni. Ferdinand was badly wounded in the attack and had to leave the group to recover. In his absence, Fudge was able to assert his dominance and attain the alpha position.

After falling from alpha status, Ferdinand was generally excluded from the core group of male chimpanzees. But in 2019, while Fudge was away from the group, Ferdinand aligned with his brother Faustino and nephew Fundi to rejoin the core group. However, Fudge was able to regain alpha status.

Ferdinand has been successful in siring offspring. Infants he fathered included Diaz by Dilly fathered at very young age of 12 in 2005, Tabora (2006– ) by Tanga, and Gizmo (2010–2016) by Gremlin.

=== Flirt ===
Flirt (b. July 1998) is Fifi's youngest surviving daughter. Her father was Kris, who would later become alpha male of the troop. She was a large baby and grew rapidly. This probably allowed her to survive when her mother died before she was seven years old. Although she spent a few lonely months after Fifi's death, she would begin to travel with her brothers. The documentary Chimpanzee Family Fortunes ends with Flirt finding solace after months of loneliness by being groomed by eldest brother Freud. She followed in the footsteps of her sister Flossi in eventually emigrating to the Mitumba Chimpanzee Community in 2013.

=== Fudge ===
Fudge (b. 1996) is Fanni's oldest surviving son. His father is Sheldon, a former alpha male. He is the fifth male of the F-family to reach alpha male status, overthrowing his own maternal uncle Ferdinand in October 2016. Fudge had joined a coalition that included his brother Fundi, his father Sheldon, his uncle Sampson and his cousin Zeus in opposition to Ferdinand. In October 2016 Fudge led an attack by the rival males on Ferdinand. Fundi was his primary supporter in the attack and they received some support from their mother Fanni, who is Ferdinand's sister. After seriously wounding Ferdinand in the attack, Fudge was able to assert his dominance over the remaining group males to attain alpha male status.

Ferdinand was excluded from the core group of male chimpanzees after Fudge established himself as alpha male. But in 2019, Fudge was away from the group, perhaps with a fertile female, and Ferdinand aligned with Faustino and Fundi to rejoin the core group. Fudge was temporarily excluded from the group by this coalition but was eventually able to regain alpha status. He remained the alpha male as of October 2025.

=== Fundi ===
Fundi (b. 2000) is Fanni's second oldest surviving son. His father is the former alpha male Sheldon; Fudge, the alpha male as of 2016, is his full brother. In 2016 Fundi helped Fudge attack their uncle Ferdinand, the previous alpha male, which allowed Fudge to attain his alpha status. In 2019 Fundi helped Ferdinand rejoin the core group. In surprising occurrence, in 2017 high-ranking Kasekela female Fanni was observed attacking lower-ranked female, Imani, with the goal of killing her infant, but was stopped and herself attacked by none other than her own son, Fundi.

== G-family ==
=== Melissa ===
Melissa (c.1950–1986) was a high-ranking female and mother of long-term alpha male Goblin. Researchers also suspected that she was related to alpha male Humphrey and another male, Mr McGregor. She was afflicted by polio in the 1966 epidemic, and for a while was paralysed in her neck and shoulders, and was forced to walk bipedally. She would regain use of her arms, although she never fully regained movement of her neck. She gave birth to two sets of twins, one set in 1976 of which neither survived the year, and another set in 1977, of which only one, Gimble, survived to adulthood. Her other offspring who survived to adulthood was daughter Gremlin. Her daughter Gremlin and her granddaughter Gaia have also given birth to twins.

=== Goblin ===
Goblin (September 1964 – August 2004) was Melissa's oldest son. He was discovered by Goodall when he was just a few hours old, with a twisted face that led her to name him Goblin. Goblin was protected by Figan as an adolescent, but at the young age of 15 in 1979 he challenged and defeated Figan to become the top-ranking male. He was defeated and brutally beaten by a coalition of older males later in the year, giving up his top ranking. Goblin regained the top-ranked position in 1982, and was the unambiguous alpha male, able to control even coalitions of rival males, by 1984. Goblin maintained his alpha status until 1989, when he was badly beaten and injured by a coalition of males led by Wilkie. He was sterilized by a bite to his testicles in the process. He spent time away from the rest of the community recovering from his injuries, during which time Goodall administered medication to help him return to health. For a time after returning to the community he became the 2nd highest ranking male after Wilkie. He later became Freud's key ally in becoming and retaining his position as alpha male, apparently going so far as to encourage Freud to challenge Wilkie for the role. While Freud was alpha Goblin was able to be a wedge between Freud and Frodo, who had previously been close companions, but when Frodo overtook Freud, Goblin switched his allegiance to Frodo. Goblin died of disease in August 2004.

After recovering from his injuries, Goblin maintained a high-ranking status within the community by forming alliances with the alpha males, especially Freud and Frodo. While he was establishing himself as a contender for the alpha position, he would occasionally beat up Goodall. In 1983, when his mother Melissa was in estrus, he forced himself upon her despite her efforts to resist. Fanni and Flossi, by Fifi, and Tanga (1989– ), by Patti, are his daughters.

=== Gremlin ===
Gremlin (b. 1970) is Melissa's only daughter to survive to adulthood. Her father was Evered, who, more than 20 years later, also fathered the alpha male Ferdinand. Goodall has described Gremlin as one of her favourite chimpanzes, due to Gremlin’s patience as a mother and expertise in fishing for termites. She has raised twins, Golden and Glitter, who are the oldest known wild twin chimpanzees. She had male offspring in Getty (1982–1986), Galahad (1988–2000), Gimli (2004– ), Gizmo (2010–2016) and a female offspring in Gaia (1993– ). In 2015, she gave birth to Grendel and in 2019, at the age of almost 50, she gave birth to a son, Goodali.

Although males are perceived as the more aggressive sex in chimpanzees, studies at Gombe have revealed that aggression between females does occur. Such attacks were observed of Fifi and her adult daughter, Fanni, aggressively harassing fellow Kasekela female, Gremlin, on three different occasions; the first being in 1993 following the birth of her daughter Gaia, and then five years later following the birth of her twins. This was followed by another attack on Gremlin six years later following the birth of her next baby. Researchers could only speculate that the attacks on infants of other females had to do with food competition, as each female strives to secure resources for her own group of offspring and thus the expansion of another female's family unit could deplete resources. The attacks by Fifi and Fanni mirror those of previous perpetrators Passion and Pom in the 1970s, which proved that cannibalism, though deemed rare, does occur among both male and female chimpanzees.

Clever females like Gremlin, who bore the brunt of infanticidal females, employed two counterstrategies to avoid attacks on them and newborns. One strategy is being in close proximity to adult males for protection, as Gremlin initially did by sticking close to Frodo (the father of her twins) in 1998. The second strategy used by Gremlin was taking a newborn baby from her daughter, Gaia, in 2006, presumably in fear of it being attacked. Although Gremlin's instincts were justified from her own experiences, the latter case ended with the infant dying just five months later.

=== Gimble ===
Gimble (b. October 1977) is one of two of Melissa's sons to survive to adulthood. He was one of a set of twins; however, his twin brother Gyre died in 1978. As a twin, he grew into a healthy but small adult. He reached a relatively high rank in the late 1990s but fell to a low-ranking male by 2004. He fathered at least two children, Mambo by Malaika, born in 2004, and Zinda (2006 – October 2012) by Trezia. He disappeared in early 2007.

=== Galahad ===
Galahad (1988–2000) was Gremlin's third son. His father was a low-ranking male, Atlas. Galahad was described by researchers at Gombe as mischievous and playful, often observed terrorizing baboons. In the BBC television programme Chimpanzee Diary 1998 Galahad was depicted being supportive of his mother Gremlin, staying near by even though he could not intervene during her attack by other community females trying to take her newborn twins. He was developing into a favourite character for the human observers in Gombe, but was unfortunately struck down by the flu epidemic in 2000 and died in February of that year

=== Gaia ===
Gaia (b. February 1993) is Gremlin's oldest daughter. Her father was Wilkie. As a juvenile, she helped her mother raise the twins Glitter and Golden, and this is shown in a number of documentaries about the community. Gaia gave birth to her first baby in April 2006, but the baby's grandmother Gremlin took the infant from her daughter, presumably in fear of it being attacked. Although Gremlin's instincts were justified from her own experiences of other community females attacking her newborns, the infant died just five months later. Gaia's second infant was stillborn, but her third pregnancy resulted in twins. However, once again her mother took over the babies, and one of the twins died at a few days old. She finally gave birth to a son named Google in 2010, fathered by Faustino. She gave birth to a son named Gabo in 2015.

=== Glitter and Golden ===
Glitter and Golden (b. July 1998) are the twin daughters of Gremlin, fathered by Frodo. Gaia contributed to the raising of Gremlin’s twins, helping them to become the only known pair of wild chimpanzee twins known that have survived to the age of sexual maturity. Each of the pair exhibits a different personality. Glitter is shy and cautious, while Golden is more adventurous and willing to engage in rough and tumble activities. In 2011, Glitter gave birth to daughter named Gossamer, who was fathered by Sheldon. She gave birth to a son named Ghurubu in 2016. In 2012, Golden gave birth to a daughter named Glamour. Golden also gave birth to a son named Gombe in 2017. She had another baby in 2022. Golden and Glitter have remained extremely close through adulthood.

== P-family ==
=== Passion ===
Passion (c.1951–1982) was a central female of the Kasekela community. She, along with her daughter Pom, captured, killed, and ate about ten newborns at Gombe. Passion possessed a rather domineering and aggressive personality; according to Goodall, Passion was an indifferent mother to her three surviving offspring, but she became a very high-ranking female. She became more solitary later in life and died of some type of wasting disease in 1982. In addition to Pom, Prof and Pax, she gave birth to a baby in 1962 which died in infancy. She also had a stillborn baby, or possibly a miscarriage in 1970.

=== Pom ===
Pom (1965–1983) was Passion's oldest known offspring to survive to adulthood. Pom was instrumental in helping her mother capture and kill community infants. Pom gave birth herself to Pan in 1978, and was very cautious with the infant around her mother. Pan died of injuries from an accident in 1981. Pom eventually disappeared about a year after her mother's death. She may have transferred to another community, but she was never seen again.

=== Prof ===
Prof (27 October 1971 – 198?) was a male that survived to adulthood. He and Pom offered their little brother comfort following Passion's death. Prof and Pax associated closely for a number of years. Prof is deceased.

=== Pax ===
Pax (b. 16 December 1977) was Passion's last offspring. He was only four years old when he was orphaned. He had the support of an elder brother and sister, and had very few behavioural issues following his mother's death. When Pax was very young, his mother was wounded in some type of conflict. Pax lost his testicles as a result of the conflict, which has affected his personality greatly. He is small for a male, does not compete in the male hierarchy, and is unable to reproduce. He also has been chosen by a couple of orphans as a companion.

=== Pan ===
Pan (17 October 1978 – 1981) was the only known offspring of Pom. He was injured after being blown from a palm tree by a strong wind and died four days later.

== T-family ==
=== Patti ===
Patti (c.1961–2005) was not born in the Kasekela community but joined the community in 1973. She was an assertive female who spent much time on her own. Her first two infants died before reaching adulthood, but she later successfully raised several chimps. Besides Tapit, Tita, Tanga, Titan and Tarzan, she had two offspring who died in infancy, including her first born Pibi (1978) and a baby of unknown sex in 1988. She was killed by males from the rival Mitumba Chimpanzee Community in 2005. A female chimpanzee leaving the safety of her community territory poses risks; studies on chimpanzee intercommunity relations revealed that chimpanzees are likely to be attacked by the territorial males of a rival community, and the intensity of the attacks depends on the gender of the intruder. If the stranger is female, it depends on whether or not they are of any reproductive benefit to the males. Young, oestrus females are often spared an attack because they are deemed to be potential new mates, but an anestrus female (non-cycling or lactating) is considered of very little use for the males, which results in lethal aggression and fatality.

=== Tapit ===
Tapit (1979–1983) was Patti's second-oldest son. He had a difficult upbringing due to Patti's generally poor child-rearing skills; he was frequently dropped, carried upside-down, rarely fed and was essentially not supervised after reaching four months of age and developing the ability to walk. Tapit surviving as long as he did was attributed by Goodall to the infertile chimp Gigi, who lacking any children of her own appointed herself as Tapit's primary protector. Tapit died of an unidentified illness, but Patti would prove to have learnt from his experience and was a model mother to her following children.

=== Tita ===
Tita (b. January 1984) is Patti's oldest daughter. She gave birth to her first child, Tibi, in 1995; he died in infancy. Another son, Tofiki (fathered by Sheldon), was born in 2000, and killed in 2004 when Freud attacked him while grooming Tita.

=== Tanga ===
Tanga (b. April 1989) is Patti's second oldest daughter. Her father was Goblin. She still lives in the community and gave birth to her first infant, Tom, in 2001. In 2006, she gave birth to a daughter named Tabora. In October 2012, she gave birth to a daughter named Tarime who died in 2013. In 2014, she gave birth to Tukuyu, whose father is mostly likely Fudge.

=== Titan ===
Titan (b. August 1994) is Patti's third oldest son, fathered by Frodo. Titan displays aggressive behaviour resembling his father Frodo's violent tendencies. Like Frodo, as a youngster he would throw rocks at researchers. Also like his father, Titan is large, and as of 2013 was the largest male in the community. As of 2012, researchers believed that he may have been ready to challenge Ferdinand for alpha status, as he spent a lot of time near Ferdinand and sometimes helped Ferdinand maintain control. However, over the following year, Titan slipped in rank. Researchers suspect that he may be afraid to challenge for the alpha spot, and also that his reluctance to groom other chimps may inhibit him from forming the alliances needed to attain alpha status. As of early 2014, Titan had occasionally been able to ally himself with Ferdinand's older brother Faustino in attempts to challenge Ferdinand, but he has not been able to maintain that alliance reliably, and at times Faustino would also join with Ferdinand to attack Titan. Titan fathered a daughter, Baseke, by Bahati in 2010.

=== Tarzan ===
Tarzan (b. October 1999) is Patti's fourth oldest son. His father was Frodo, making him Titan's full brother.

=== Tom ===
Tom (b. March 2001) is Tanga's first son, fathered by Kris.

=== Tabora ===
Tabora (b. 2007) is Tanga's first daughter. Her father is Ferdinand.

== S-family ==
=== Sparrow ===
Sparrow (b. 1958) is the oldest female and matriarch of the family. She has had seven offspring, including four sons (Sheldon, Steve, Spud and Sinbad) and three daughters (Sandi, Barbet and Schweini). Four of the seven are alive: Sandi, Sheldon, Sinbad and Schweini. Her son Sheldon became the alpha male of the Kasekela community in 2004. Steve (born 1989) and Spud (born 1996) both died in infancy.

=== Sandi ===
Sandi (b. October 1973) is Sparrow's oldest daughter and first offspring. Sandi is one of the shyer females of the Gombe chimpanzees. She grew up within the community but her mother was not social and as a result, she still has a timid nature. Sandi is still close to her mother, Sparrow, and the two prefer each other's company rather than anyone else's. Sandi was very nervous of large groups of chimpanzees within the community and often prevented her offspring from playing with the others. However, she has become much more confident and her offspring have thrived.

Sandi has five offspring which include two daughters, Sherehe and Samwise and two sons, Sampson and Siri who are both sired by Apollo.

=== Barbet ===
Barbet (c. 1978 – 1992) was Sparrow's second-oldest daughter. She died in 1992.

=== Sheldon ===
Sheldon (b. May 1983) is Sparrow's oldest son. Sheldon grew up within the community as a subordinate male but within 2004 following the vacancy of the alpha position after former alpha Frodo's departure, when he became the alpha male. Sheldon held on to dominance for only a year and lost the alpha position to another male, Kris, in 2005. He was part of a coalition that helped his son Fudge attain the alpha male position in 2016. He fathered Fanni's first three offspring, Fudge, Fundi and Familia. He was a low ranking male when he fathered Fudge and Fundi, but had become the alpha male by the time he fathered Familia. He also fathered Tita's son Tofiki in 2000 while a mid-ranking male.

=== Schweini ===
Schweini (b. April 1991) is Sparrow's third oldest daughter. Her father is Wilkie. She gave birth to her first infant in September 2007 but she died in infancy. She gave birth to the female Safi on 16 October 2008, but she died in August 2011. She also gave birth to a son Schall in November 2012. She was brutally attacked by females of the Mitumba chimpanzee community while associating with males of that community in both 2004 and 2005.

=== Sinbad ===
Sinbad (b. June 2001) is Sparrow's youngest son. His father was Frodo.

=== Sherehe ===
Sherehe (January 1991 – 11 May 2006) was Sandi's oldest daughter and first offspring. Her father was Beethoven. She gave birth to her first infant, Shangaa in 2004.

=== Sampson ===
Sampson (b. April 1996) is Sandi's oldest son. His father is Apollo. He is a low-ranking male. Sampson was part of a coalition that included his uncle Sheldon and his cousin Fundi that helped Sampson's cousin Fudge supplant Ferdinand as alpha male in 2016.

=== Samwise ===
Samwise (b. June 2001) is Sandi's second-oldest daughter. Her father was Frodo.

== Male dominance ==
Chimpanzees live in large mixed-sexed communities, in a society that is male dominant and the male chimpanzee who rules above all others (males and females) is referred to as the alpha male. The alpha male is the highest-ranking, most dominant chimpanzee in the entire community, and can control most situations, including situations in which he is opposed by a coalition of other males. Nonetheless, an alpha male typically cannot monopolize breeding opportunities, and in some cases lower-ranking males have been more successful at mating than alpha males, since the alpha male has to spend much energy maintaining his rank. Faben (Figan's older brother with a paralysed arm), Evered (defeated by Figan in his bid for alpha status who became Ferdinand's father) and Sherry (lower-ranking male who became Frodo's father) are examples of males who successfully devoted their energy to breeding success despite not attaining alpha status. However, a very secure alpha male, such as Frodo, can use his status to increase his access to females in estrus, especially during the period when she is at peak fertility.

Goliath was the first chimpanzee Goodall recognized as the alpha male. In 1964, Mike, who was previously a low-ranking male, deposed him. Goliath remained a high-ranking male for several more years, but fell in rank as he aged. Eventually, Goliath was one of the chimpanzees who left the Kasekela community to form the Kahama community. However, in 1975 he was brutally attacked by a group of Kasekela males led by Faben, and died as a result of his injuries.

Mike figured out that incorporating cans and other objects left by the human researchers into his displays would make them more effective. These displays indeed allowed him to take over the alpha male rank in 1964. By 1969, a group of younger males including Humphrey, Faben, Figan and Evered challenged and defeated him, making Humphrey the alpha male and returning Mike to his low-ranking position.

From 1972 through 1989, two males, Figan and Goblin, held the alpha position. Figan was able to defeat Humphrey when Faben became his ally. For a period after Faben's death in 1975, Figan remained the top-ranking male, but was unable to control coalitions of other males when they joined together, making his status as alpha male ambiguous. Within a few months, Figan reestablished himself as the unambiguous alpha by forging alliances with other high-ranking males, such as Humphrey. In 1979, 15-year-old Goblin, who had previously been protected by Figan challenged him for the alpha position. Goblin temporarily held the top-ranking position in 1979, although could not control coalitions of other males, before the more senior males brutally beat him and restored Figan to the alpha position. By 1982, Goblin had reestablished himself as the top-ranking male; by 1984, he was unambiguously the alpha male, able to control situations even against coalitions of other males.

In 1989, Wilkie defeated Goblin and attained the alpha position. Wilkie attained this position despite being one of the smallest males in the community, at 37 kilograms (82 lb). According to researchers at the University of Minnesota's Jane Goodall Institute Center for Primate Studies, Wilkie attained his position primarily by becoming popular by obsessively grooming other males. Unlike most males, Wilkie also groomed females. Wilkie also made effective use of charging displays. Wilkie was overthrown in 1992 by his childhood playmate Freud, who was in turn deposed by his brother Frodo in 1997 while Freud was ill. Freud, at 44.8 kg (99 lb), was larger than Wilkie and relied on a mixture of moderate force and grooming to become alpha and maintain his status. Frodo, at 51.2 kg (113 lb), was one of the largest males ever seen in the group, relied primarily on brute force to attain and maintain alpha status. After Frodo became ill in 2002, he was brutally beaten by a coalition of males led by Sheldon and spent two years travelling away from the rest of the community. No chimpanzee was able to establish himself as an alpha male until 2004. Sheldon briefly held the top-ranking male position in 2004; however, by 2005, Kris had defeated all competitors, including Frodo, and established himself as the unambiguous alpha male. In 2008, Kris was supplanted as alpha male by Ferdinand, the youngest surviving brother of Freud and Frodo. Unlike most deposed alpha males, who tend to stay away from the group for a while in order to avoid further injury while the new alpha is consolidating his position, Kris stayed with the group after being deposed and eventually died of his injuries.

In October 2016, Ferdinand was attacked by a coalition of males led by his nephews Fudge and Fundi and also included the former alpha male Sheldon. Ferdinand was badly injured in the attack and Fudge asserted himself as the new alpha male.

Name	Reign	Lifespan	Notes	Reference
Goliath	1961–1964	?–1975		
Mike	1964–1969	?–1975		
Humphrey	1969–1971	c. 1947–1980		
vacant	1971–1972		After Humphrey was deposed as alpha in 1971, no chimpanzee clearly held the highest rank until Figan established himself as alpha male over Humphrey and Evered in 1972.	
Figan	1972–1979	1953–1982	For a nine-month period in 1975 and 1976, while Figan was clearly the highest-ranking male, he was not an unambiguous alpha male.	
Goblin	1979	1964–2004	In 1979, Goblin was able to oust Figan and become the top-ranked male, although he was not able to establish himself as an unambiguous alpha male before Figan regained his status.	
Figan	1979–1982	1953–1982		
Goblin	1982–1989	1964–2004	Although Goblin established himself as the highest-ranking male during 1982, he did not become the unambiguous alpha male until 1984.	
Wilkie	1989–1993	1972–2012		
Freud	1993–1997	1971–2014	Nephew of Figan	
Frodo	1997–2002	1976–2013	Replaced his brother Freud; nephew of Figan	
vacant	2002–2004		After Frodo was ousted as alpha male during his illness in 2002, no male established himself as unambiguously the highest-ranking male until 2004.	
Sheldon	2004–2005	1982–	Was part of a coalition that helped his son Fudge become alpha male in 2016	
Kris	2005–2008	1982–2010		
Ferdinand	2008–2016	1992–	Youngest brother of Freud and Frodo; nephew of Figan; displaced by his sister's son Fudge.	
Fudge	2016–	1996–	Nephew of Freud, Frodo and Ferdinand, grandnephew of Figan, son of Sheldon, and grandson of Goblin.	

== Female dominance ==
Even though chimpanzees live in a male-dominant society, the female chimpanzees in the Kasekela community have evolved their own pecking order, in which the top-ranking female has priority access to food, mates and sleeping sites. Studies in Gombe have discovered that the rank of a mother directly correlates to infant survival, fast maturing of daughters and faster production of offspring. High-ranking adult females and adolescent males frequently fight as the latter attempts to establish themselves on the male dominance hierarchy; if a high-ranking female does not have a dependent child (as was the case, for example, with the large and dominant yet infertile Gigi) they are more capable of winning fights with males.

The dominance of a female to other community females depends largely on family ties. The bond between mothers and daughters is instrumental in dominance interaction between females in a community, especially in the aspect of infanticidal attacks. Infanticide among chimpanzees, although rarely filmed, is a common occurrence, with observations at Gombe Stream National Park revealing that such gruesome acts are done by females within their own community. The reason for females attacking and often consuming the infants of other females has more to do with political gains of asserting dominance than hunger, further supporting the idea that social rank is a key factor in such attacks. The perpetrators are usually higher-ranking than the victim, and most often supported by their female kin (as in the case of the mother-daughter coalitions such as Passion/Pom, Fifi/Fanni, Sparrow/Samwise, all of whom were known to carry out infanticidal attacks on other females' offspring in the Kasekela community). The support of female kin is key in how confident a female is in attacking another, and studies have revealed that the more kin a female chimpanzee has in the community, the higher her social rank is likely to be. Unlike most other chimpanzee communities in which females emigrate to new communities at sexual maturity, the majority of the Kasekela females stay with their mothers for life, creating strongly-bonded matrilines, of which there are several in the Kasekela community, leading to competition between the females. The killing of another female's infant, which often occurs within the first month after birth, has been said to further the success of a dominant matriline by reducing the size of a competing matriline. A lower-ranking female would rarely attempt an attack on a female who outranks her, especially if the higher-ranking female is in close proximity to her high-ranking kin. A higher-ranking female would not hesitate to attack and attempt to grab the infant of a lower-ranking mother, and with the support of her daughters would be successful.

Of the infanticidal attacks observed at Gombe where the victim's infant is killed and even consumed, almost all of them involved a coalition of high-ranking mother and daughter against a lower-ranking female, whose lower rank limited the support she could get from her own kin. It is during the introduction period where a female brings her new infant to the other chimpanzees in her community that such cannibalistic attacks occur. The new mother's low rank may make her infant vulnerable, but observations at Gombe have revealed that friendships with adult males may be beneficial to a female when it comes to protecting herself and her vulnerable infant from aggressive high-ranked females. Although male chimpanzees have little vested interest in babies that they are never sure they sired, they will sometimes intervene in stopping such attacks on females by other females. Such an occurrence was observed in 2012 when Kasekela female Sparrow attacked younger female Tanga with the aim of killing her infant, but was chased away by the males who happen to be in close proximity. In surprising occurrence, in 2017 high-ranking Kasekela female Fanni was observed attacking lower-ranked female, Imani, with the goal of killing her infant, but was stopped and herself attacked by none other than her own son, Fundi.

Jane Goodall considered elderly female Flo, the original matriarch of what is now the famous 'F' family of Gombe, to be the most dominant of the females in the Kasekela community at the time that the study began (in the 1960s) and this was evident in her interaction with other females, where she was never hesitant about asserting herself towards new females. She was a successful mother and fierce defender of her offspring, one of whom would succeed her. Fifi was a popular female in Gombe, not only from her high-ranking family but also from her close ties with the males. She inherited her mother's superior status and because her older brothers Faben and Figan were among the top big males, she grew up with enormous confidence. As a mother of nine, Fifi was fiercely defensive of her offspring and her authority was rarely questioned. This was also possible because of her ability to fearlessly navigate a male-dominant society, helped in part from the fact that her adult sons Freud and Frodo grew to become the alpha males in the community. Having produced the most offspring out of any female during her time, Fifi was regarded as Gombe's most fertile female and her ability to have reproduced as frequently as she did, and have enough resources and social standing to ensure the survival of seven of her nine children validates the studies of how the social rank of a chimpanzee mother directly correlates to infant survival, fast maturing of daughters and faster production of offspring.

Just as her mother's high status rubbed off on her, Fifi's high standing in the community benefited her daughters. Although second daughter Flossi emigrated to dominate another chimp community her eldest daughter Fanni remained with her mother, and together they became a formidable force in Gombe. Observers in Gombe discovered that the linear hierarchy among females becomes apparent in aggressive interactions involving infanticide. One of two contexts for female-female aggressive encounters in Gombe was the presence of newborn infants. Matriarch Fifi was known to be a feisty female who, although a very successful mother herself, was observed to have carried out ferocious and infanticidal attacks on other, lower-ranking females in her community. Such attacks were observed of Fifi and her adult daughter, Fanni, aggressively harassing lower-ranking Kasekela female, Gremlin, on three different occasions, with the goal of killing her newborn infants. Since the loss of her mother Fifi in 2004, Fanni, now the oldest surviving female of the once mighty 'F' family, shifted her home range, probably in an attempt to distance herself from the other, bigger matrilines, and this is despite having high-ranking male relatives in the community, including her son Fudge who has been the top male since 2016 and her high-ranking brothers Faustino and Ferdinand (Fudge's predecessor). Fanni shifted her range to the southern part of the Kasekela territory, further away from the other community females, particularly Gremlin's growing 'G' family, which now makes up a large portion of the Kasekela community and who occupy the top of the hierarchy.

== Other communities of chimpanzees at Gombe Stream National Park ==
Within the Gombe Stream National Park live other chimpanzee communities other than the Kasekela, which also inhabit certain home ranges. The two other communities currently bordering the Kasekela community include:

- Mitumba Chimpanzee Community
- Kalande Chimpanzee Community

One extinct community of Gombe was:

- Kahama Chimpanzee Community

The Kahama community came about from a split within the Kasekela community. In the early 1970s several of the Kasekela chimpanzees, including 8 adult males, kept to the northern portion of the Kasekela range, while others, including 7 adult males, kept to the southern portion of the range. The two groups became hostile towards each other, and had less and less to do with each other, and eventually the southern community became totally separate, and was referred to by researchers as the Kahama community. By 1974, the Kasekela males began to attack the Kahama chimpanzees in what was referred to as the "Four Year War." Figan, Faben, Humphrey, Frodo's father Sherry, and Sherry's brother Jomeo were often among the ringleaders of the attacks. Researchers described these attacks as being of the nature of raids, as opposed to simply defending their territory. The Kasekela chimpanzees did not collect food during these "raids," although at least three Kahama females were brought back to the Kasekela community. Kahama chimpanzees were brutally attacked during these raids and often were killed. Former Kasekela alpha male Goliath, who had joined Kahama and was then very old, was killed in one such attack in 1975. Kahama's alpha male Charley was killed in 1977. By 1977 the Kahama community had been completely wiped out, and the Kasekela community absorbed its territory.

Annexing the Kahama territory brought the Kasekela community in contact with the Kalande Chimpanzee Community. The Kalande community may have been attacking Kahama chimpanzees during the Four Year War, and after Kahama was wiped out they began to attack Kasekela chimpanzees. At least one Kasekela female was badly injured in an attack by Kalande chimpanzees, and at least two infants were killed in such attacks. Former Kasekela alpha male Humphrey died in 1981, possibly from injuries from an attack by Kalande chimpanzees.

Kasekela has had interactions with the Mitumba Chimpanzee Community as well. Some of these interactions have been hostile, and some Mitumba chimpanzees are known to have been killed by Kasekela chimpanzees. At least two Kasekela females, Fifi's daughters Flossi and Flirt, have emigrated from Kasekela to join the Mitumba community. Based on circumstantial evidence researchers believed that it is possible that Fifi herself may have died as a result of an attack by Mitumba chimpanzees.

== Books about the community ==
- Goodall, J. (1971). In the Shadow of Man. Houghton Mifflin. ISBN 978-0-395-33145-3.
- Goodall, J. (1986). The Chimpanzees of Gombe: Patterns of Behavior. The Belknap Press of Harvard University Press. ISBN 978-0-674-11649-8.
- Goodall, J. (1990). Through a Window. Houghton-Mifflin. ISBN 978-0-395-59925-9.
- Goodall, J. (1997). The Chimpanzee Family Book. North-South Books. ISBN 978-1-55858-803-5.
- Shah, A.; Rogers, F. (2014). Tales from Gombe. Firefly. ISBN 978-1-77085-468-0.

== Films about the community ==
- van Lawick, H., Jampel, B. (1984). Among the Wild Chimpanzees. National Geographic.
- Hallet, D., Goodall, J. (1990). Jane Goodall: My Life with the Chimpanzees. National Geographic.
- Goodman, K. & Simon, K. (1990). Chimps: So Like Us (DVD). HBO.
- van Lawick, H., Sutherland, D. (1991). People of the Forest: The Chimps of Gombe. Discovery Channel.
- Lickley, D., Low, S., Goodall, J. (2002). Jane Goodall's Wild Chimpanzees (IMAX).
- Bristow, M., Goodall, J. (2004). Return to Gombe. Discovery Channel.
- D'Auvergne, L. (2006). Chimpanzee Family Fortunes. BBC.
- Brett Morgen (2017). Jane. National Geographic.

== See also ==
- Gombe Chimpanzee War – 1974–1978 event in Tanzania
- List of individual apes
