= Ngogo Chimpanzee War =

Date	2015 – present (10–11 years)
Location	Kibale National Park, Uganda 00°30′N 30°24′E
Status	Ongoing

Belligerents
Western Ngogo chimpanzees	Central Ngogo chimpanzees

Strength
108	100+ overall (initially)

Casualties and losses
(0) confirmed fatalities.	≥28 Central Ngogo chimpanzees killed (incl. 19 infants)
- Location within Uganda Ngogo Chimpanzee War (Africa)

The Western and Central factions of chimpanzees of the Ngogo hill region in Kibale National Park, Uganda, have been engaged in a violent conflict since 2015. The conflict has been characterized by one-sided violence, including killing, brutal attacks, and mutilations, by the Western faction against the Central faction. Because the Ngogo chimpanzees formerly constituted a single peaceful community that violently split apart, this conflict has been described as a "civil war". The New York Times said the conflict was the bloodiest among chimpanzees ever recorded.

This is the second major conflict between chimpanzees that has been observed by primatologists, the first being the Gombe Chimpanzee War of the 1970s in Tanzania.

== Background ==
The community of chimpanzees living in the densely forested Ngogo region of Kibale National Park had been documented to have killed 21 members of neighbouring groups between 1999 and 2008.

By 2015, the community consisted of about 200 members that had been living in relative cohesion for 20 years. Though various cliques existed, they generally cooperated and defended their territory together from other chimpanzee communities. Social cohesion began to break down, however, after several individuals of the Ngogo community, who had helped to bridge the gaps between the cliques, died from disease in 2014. Furthermore, a new alpha male rose in the community, furthering tension.

== Conflict ==
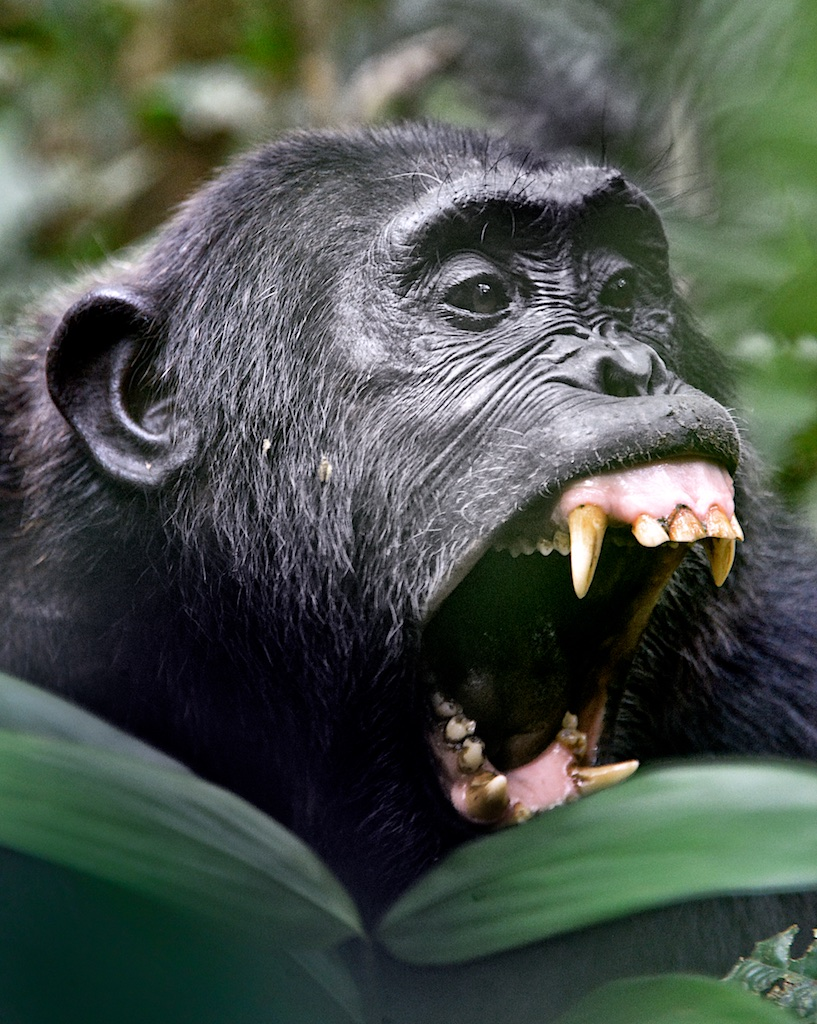
The large canine teeth of a chimpanzee in Kibale. The main evolutionary pressure behind male chimpanzees' canine tooth size is socio-behavioral: displays of dominance, intimidation and defense.

In 2015, tension among the Ngogo chimpanzees caused low-level violence, with two rival factions emerging. These were described as the Western and Central Ngogo chimpanzees by researchers. By 2018, the division had become complete, and the violence escalated in intensity. The Western faction, despite being numerically inferior, launched coordinated lethal raids into the Central Ngogo chimpanzees' territory, seeking out and killing rival adult males. The raiders often ambushed isolated chimpanzees, overwhelming their targets with numbers. From 2021, the Western raiders also began to target and kill infants. The Western faction's attacks were so successful that the conflict has been described as a "one-sided rout", with the Westerners growing in numbers from 76 to 108, while the population of the Central faction suffered a "stepwise decline".

By 2026, at least 28 chimpanzees, including 19 infants, had been killed by the western Ngogo chimpanzees during the conflict. All casualties had been among the members of the Central faction.

== Media coverage ==
The Ngogo community was the primary subject of the 2023 Netflix docuseries Chimp Empire. Directed by James Reed and narrated by Mahershala Ali, the series brought global attention to the "Western" and "Central" factions just as their conflict was escalating. Reed also directed the film Rise of the Warrior Apes before the split between the two factions.

In April 2026, major international outlets including the BBC, The New York Times, and The Guardian reported on a study published in the journal Science. These reports highlighted the war as the first rigorously documented "permanent fission" and subsequent "civil war" in wild chimpanzees without human intervention.

== See also ==
- Killer ape theory, proposed by Raymond Dart in 1953
- Chimpanzee violence
