= Chimp Empire =

2023 documentary television series

- Genre: Documentary
- Directed by: James Reed
- Narrated by: Mahershala Ali
- Original language: English
- No. of seasons: 1
- No. of episodes: 4

Production
- Cinematography: Ben Sadd

Original release
- Network: Netflix
- Release: April 19, 2023

Chimp Empire is a 2023 Netflix television series about chimpanzees, narrated by Mahershala Ali. Set in Uganda's Kibale National Park, it follows the lives of rival groups of chimpanzees.

== Plot ==
Chimp Empire follows the lives of the Ngogo chimpanzees, the largest group of chimpanzees ever known. The series explores the complex social dynamics of the chimpanzee community, including the relationships between males and females, parents and children, and rivals. It also examines the challenges the chimpanzees face, such as competition for food and territory and the threat of poaching.

== Characters ==
=== Central Group ===
Jackson - The 31-year-old alpha male of the Central Group. The group respect and honour him.

Miles - 41 years old, and the largest chimpanzee ever seen at Ngogo, Miles is Jackson's closest ally and second in the group's ranking.

Abrams - The third-highest-ranking member of the Central Group, 21-year-old Abrams has ambitions of overthrowing Jackson and becoming alpha himself. He takes every chance he can to gain power and show off to other group members.

Gus - Having recently left his mother, 14-year-old Gus is socially awkward and spends most of his time alone, but like most other chimps, he is ambitious and seeks power. He is also very observant.

Christine - 21 years old, and fiercely protective of her newest infant, Christine is among the many Central females just trying to survive in the midst of conflict.

Isobel - Known as “Christine’s baby” until the end of the final episode, when she receives her name. At the beginning of the series, Christina's youngest daughter is just 6 months old, but is developing fast, even for a chimp.

Nadine - Christine's elder daughter, 9 years old, is jealous of the attention her mother is giving to her new younger sister and has begun spending time by herself.

Pork Pie - Pork Pie is low-ranking but well-liked by the other members of the Central Group. He shies away from violence and often spends time alone.

Bartoli - A high-ranking, 38-year-old female, and ally of Jackson, who is the father of her son, Herzog.

Herzog - Six-year-old son of Bartoli, and very protective of his mother, though this can sometimes put him in danger.

Peterson - 26 years old, an ally of Jackson, fourth in the Centrallers’ ranking and an important member of patrols.

Wilson - 21 years old, and eighth in the group’s hierarchy, Wilson is short-tempered and irritable.

=== Western Group ===
Hutcherson - Richmond's younger brother, 27 years old, and the current alpha male of the Western Group, he is much less assertive than Jackson, largely due to the group's culture of power-sharing.

Garrison - The oldest male (at 44 years old) in the Western Group, Garrison is wise and knows everything about their territory. He often is the individual who leads the others to food sources.

Rollins - The 35-year-old patrol leader of the Westerners, Rollins, along with his brother Damien, is eager to gain the group more territory to support their growing population.

Damien - Rollins' younger brother, at just 15, joins him at the front of their patrols and supports him in everything they do.

Garbo - At 65, Garbo is the oldest chimp at Ngogo, and the mother of both Hutcherson and Richmond, who care for her in her old age.

Richmond - Hutcherson's older brother (34 years old) and the former alpha, Richmond lost his right hand to a poacher's snare when he was young. Though life is now harder for him, he is still able to thrive in the Western Group's supportive community.

Bergl - A 10-year-old, lonely orphaned male who is going through puberty and wants to show his strength. In episode 3 it is revealed that, though neither of them know it, he is Rollins’ son.

Joya - A 10-year-old orphaned female, who, like Bergl, is going through puberty. She is eager to help the other females with caring for their infants.

Carson - a strong 27-year-old female chimp who is both a good mother (a role model for young females like Joya), and a fighter who joins the males on patrol and hunts.

E.O. - Carson’s three-year-old son.

== Episodes ==
=== 1 - Paradise ===
This episode introduces Jackson's Central Group. Jackson performs a display of dominance in order to rally the group to him and make them respect him, though Abrams is reluctant to do so. Christine’s baby is eager to explore and socialise, but, when Jackson displays, Christine must protect her. Nadine comforts the baby, the first sign of a developing bond between the two sisters. During a rain storm, Abrams performs an unusual dominance display known as the “rain dance”. Jackson watches on, but does not yet intervene. Gus, having noticed Abrams’ rising position, attempts to groom him to initiate an alliance, but is rejected. Abrams moves off to groom a much more important ally - Miles. Jackson, with Miles by his side, leads a patrol group of adult males to defend the territory’s northern borders from a rival group. Abrams joins the front of the patrol. Gus also joins, as does Pork Pie, though reluctantly. When the patrol reaches the border, Pork Pie abandons the group and heads back alone. Gus watches him go, but elects to stay, as patrolling can be very beneficial to an individual’s social status. They charge, and eventually the northern group retreat. Christine, taking advantage of the large males’ absence, assists her baby in learning to climb trees. On their way back, the patrol encounter a group of red colobus monkeys, and successfully hunt them. Jackson shares the meat with Miles and some of the other males, but purposely excludes Abrams. Fruit is the forest’s most valuable resource, and so the fruiting of a large ficus tree is cause for celebration. From its branches, Gus notices a shape on the ground. It is Pork Pie - dead, and killed right in the centre of the territory.

=== 2 - Others ===
This episode introduces a second group of chimpanzees at Ngogo, the Westerners. Led by alpha male Hutcherson, the Westerners have a more egalitarian society than the Central Group. Here, power is shared, and each member has a role. With far fewer males than the Central Group, the females also patrol and hunt. Garrison leads the group to a honeybees' nest. Rollins and Damien lead a patrol to the borderlands, where most of the group feeds in a fruiting fig tree. Rollins and Damien however, take a small group of the adult males into Central territory. They find Pork Pie, and, seeing him as an outsider and therefore hostile, they attack and kill him. Some time later, back in the West, Bergl attempts a dominance display. He angers Buckner, another adult male, who attacks and beats him, injuring his hand. Bergl moves off into the forest to recover. Joya attempts to learn mothering skills by playing with the infants. Carson joins a hunting party, who successfully catch a black-and-white colobus monkey. Richmond, who didn't take part in the hunt (as he finds hunting difficult due to his missing hand), nonetheless gains a share of the meat, which he shares with Garbo. Bergl, having spent a long time alone and missed out on vital grooming, is weakening, and his face has become infected with parasites. His weakened state is such that a duiker no longer sees him as a threat, and approaches and smells him, and Bergl does not react. Garrison eventually realises that Bergl is missing, and goes to comfort and care for him. On a foraging trip, Damien comes across a chrysophyllum fruit. This tree only comes into fruit occasionally, and when it does, it produces more than the chimps can eat. This discovery prompts the Western Group to venture further into Central territory, where most of the chrysophyllum trees lie. It is revealed that the Central territory used to be theirs, and they are ready to take it back.

=== 3 - War ===
The third episode begins with a short prologue using archival footage to relate the history of the Ngogo chimpanzees; how the group grew, and how a small group eventually split off to form the Western Group. Back in the present, the effect that Pork Pie's death has had on the other Central chimps is explored. Nadine and her younger sister are now best friends. Under a chrysophyllum tree, Jackson displays his dominance; while Abrams and a group of other males are stationed at the western border, awaiting an attack from the Westerners. Jackson and Bartoli court, and mate; and Herzog, who must stay close to Bartoli at all times, tries to stop them, not knowing what is happening. Full of energy thanks to the ample supply of chrysophyllum fruits, the chimps are hunting often, for a variety of prey, including colobus, guenons, galagos and duikers. Jackson, having caught a duiker, uses the meat to initiate an alliance with Peterson. Wilson, on the other hand, is left out. Christine approaches and manages to procure some meat, but Wilson takes out his frustration on her, and she, in order to protect her baby, must give up the meat. She moves into a quiet area of the forest, away from the group, where she finds Gus. He comforts her, and plays with the baby. Wilson, meanwhile, initiates an alliance with Abrams, before the two join a patrol heading west. Jackson does not go, and it is revealed that he was once a Western male, before he deserted the group to become the alpha of the Centrallers. The Westerners still hold this against him, and have tried to kill him in the past. Back in the West, Bergl is back to full health, thanks to Garrison. He wrestles with Damien as Rollins watches, as a test of his strength. The entire Western Group head off as a raiding party into Central territory. They find Bartoli and Herzog, who narrowly escape with their lives. As the party continue, several of the mothers and younger chimps depart and return to their territory, including Carson and Joya. Bergl, as a young individual, should follow, but his confidence has been boosted by Rollins and Damien such that he remains to fight. It is revealed that Bergl is Rollins' son. Abrams' party of Centrallers is ready, and battle commences. Eventually, the Westerners force the Centrallers to retreat. Jackson finally joins the battle, and the rest of the group rally behind him. The Westerners are eventually forced to retreat, but in the fray, Jackson has been injured.

=== 4 - Reckoning ===
A few days after the battle, Jackson is still injured, however, as the alpha he must not show weakness. Even Miles seems more distant from him, and Abrams and Wilson are preparing their mutiny. Christine's baby continues to show strength. Abrams and Wilson attack Jackson, who flees, in full view of the entire Central Group. The Western chimps hear the commotion and sense weakness. Abrams, who was injured by Jackson, reconciles with him, bringing peace back to Central Ngogo. Gus has been spending more time with Christine, but when she prefers to play with Peterson, an old friend, he experiences jealousy and moves off on his own again. Jackson spends time alone, recovering from his injuries, and Gus grooms him. During a rain storm, the Westerners, led by Richmond, invade Central territory. The Central chimps scatter, and Jackson is separated. He is pinned down and beaten by Richmond, but Abrams, Miles, Wilson and the other Central males hear his cries and drive the Westerners away. However, in the chaos, Jackson disappears. He has been terribly injured and is unable to walk properly, but in order not to show weakness to the group, he ventures off on his own. Most of the Central chimps don't know what happened, but Peterson, who was grooming with Christine, is restless, and moves off into the forest. He finds the weak Jackson and comforts him as he dies. The remainder of the episode examines what will now happen with the other chimpanzees we have met throughout the series. Jackson's eight offspring are all shown, and Bartoli has just given birth to a son, who could be Jackson's ninth. The Westerners have had a successful year, having gained new territory and continuing to grow their population. Carson has given birth, and must now take a break from patrol duty. Bergl attempts to mate with one of the females. Garbo nears the end of her life with a secure legacy via Hutcherson, who is still the alpha, and Richmond, who killed Jackson. However, the narration states that the new Central alpha may have no fear of the Westerners, unlike Jackson, possibly changing the balance of power. Joya leaves Ngogo to find a new troop and start a family. In the Central Group, Miles may now retire from fighting, and Abrams may rise as the new alpha, but as the narration says, nothing is certain. Gus is now more socially competent and is being groomed by the other males. Christine's baby is now one year old, and has received a name - Isobel. The series ends by considering how much chimps can teach us about ourselves, and the threats they now face in the wild.

== See also ==
- Ngogo chimpanzee war
