= Mitumba chimpanzee community =

Community of wild eastern chimpanzees

The Mitumba chimpanzee community is a group of wild eastern chimpanzees that inhabit a 10-kilometre-square area of the Gombe Stream National Park, near Lake Tanganyika in Tanzania. This community borders the well-known Kasekela community of chimpanzees. The Mitumba community became well-known following the migration in 1996 of the female chimpanzee Flossi from the Kasekela community, becoming the first identified female chimpanzee to migrate from her natal group. In 2010 the community numbered 25 members. Mitumba males have occasionally been killed by males of the Kasekela community. The Mitumba community's range and size has declined since the 1970s largely as a result of competition with the Kasekela community and due to habitat destruction. Rivalry with Kasekela community in the 1990s and 2000s resulted in several Mitumba chimps being killed by Kasekela males, including the infants Rejea and Andromeda and most likely the adult male Rusambo. During this rivalry, Mitumba males killed the Kasekela adult female Patti.

== F-family ==
This family group originates from the Kasekela community which was part of the pioneering study by primatologist Dr. Jane Goodall, and the family line continues with Flossi's integration into the Mitumba community in 1996. Her younger sister Flirt later integrated into the Mitumba community in 2013.

=== Flossi ===
Flossi (born February 8, 1985) is in the Kasekela community and is Fifi's second oldest daughter. Flossi has given birth to four offspring, the males Forest (1997–) and Fansi (2001–) and females Flower (2005–) and Falidi (2009–). As of 2010, she was one of the two highest-ranking females in the community. Although males are perceived as the more aggressive sex in chimpanzees, studies at Gombe have revealed there is substantial aggressive interactions among females with each other. One of two contexts for female-female aggressive encounters in Gombe is the immigration of females into new communities upon reaching sexual maturity. Although Flossi successfully integrated into the Mitumba community, she has shown to be unwelcoming to new female arrivals, as in the case of Kasekela female, Schweini, who attempted to join Mitumba in 2004, only to experience brutal attacks by high-ranking Flossi and the other resident females.

=== Flirt ===
Flirt (b. July 1998) is Fifi's youngest surviving daughter. Her father was Kris, who would later become alpha male of the troop. She was a large baby and grew rapidly. This probably allowed her to survive when her mother died before she was seven years old. Although she spent a few lonely months after Fifi's death, she would begin to travel with her brothers. The documentary Chimpanzee Family Fortunes ends with Flirt finding solace after months of loneliness by being groomed by eldest brother Freud. She followed in the footsteps of her sister Flossi in eventually emigrating to this community.

== Edgar ==
Edgar (born 1989) joined with Rudi to kill Vincent (who was the alpha male of the Mitumba community and the only male to survive the 2004 epidemic). Edgar and Rudi battled with each other for alpha status; Edgar won in early 2005. Edgar has since then been the "alpha male," although there are only two males. He had a younger brother, Eboney, who may have been killed by Rudi during the struggle for alpha status, and a younger sister named Eden.
