= R. Brian Ferguson =

American anthropologist

Richard Brian Ferguson (born July 19, 1951) is an American anthropologist. He is an authority on warfare.

== Life ==
Richard Brian Ferguson was born in New York, New York on July 19, 1951. He spent his childhood in upstate New York.

Ferguson attended Columbia University, graduating with a bachelor's degree in anthropology in 1974. During this time he was involved in activism opposing the Vietnam war. He earned his doctorate in anthropology from Columbia University in 1988, with dissertation field work in Puerto Rico.

== Career ==
Ferguson is now a tenured professor of anthropology at Rutgers University Newark. His expertise lies in cultural anthropology, the anthropology of war, ethnic conflict, state-tribe interaction, policing, and Puerto Rico. He is part of the Department of Sociology and Anthropology as well as Global Urban Studies/Urban Systems. He has also served on the board of governors of the New York Academy of Sciences. Ferguson has published many papers critical of biological perspectives in anthropology, especially explanations of war.

== Publications ==
- The Anthropology of War (with Leslie Farragher) (1988)
- Explaining War (1990)
- When Worlds Collide (1992)
- Infrastructural Determinism (1995)
- Yanomami Warfare: A Political History (1995)
- A Paradigm for the Study of War and Society (1999)
- Violent Conflict and Control of the State (2003)
- Archaeology, Cultural Anthropology, and the Origins and Intensification of War (2006)
- War Before History (2008)
- Ten Points on War (2008)
- Chimpanzees, War, and History: Are Men Born to Kill? (2023)
