= Gombe National Park =

National Park of Tanzania

- Hifahdi ya Taifa ya Gombe
- IUCN category II (national park)
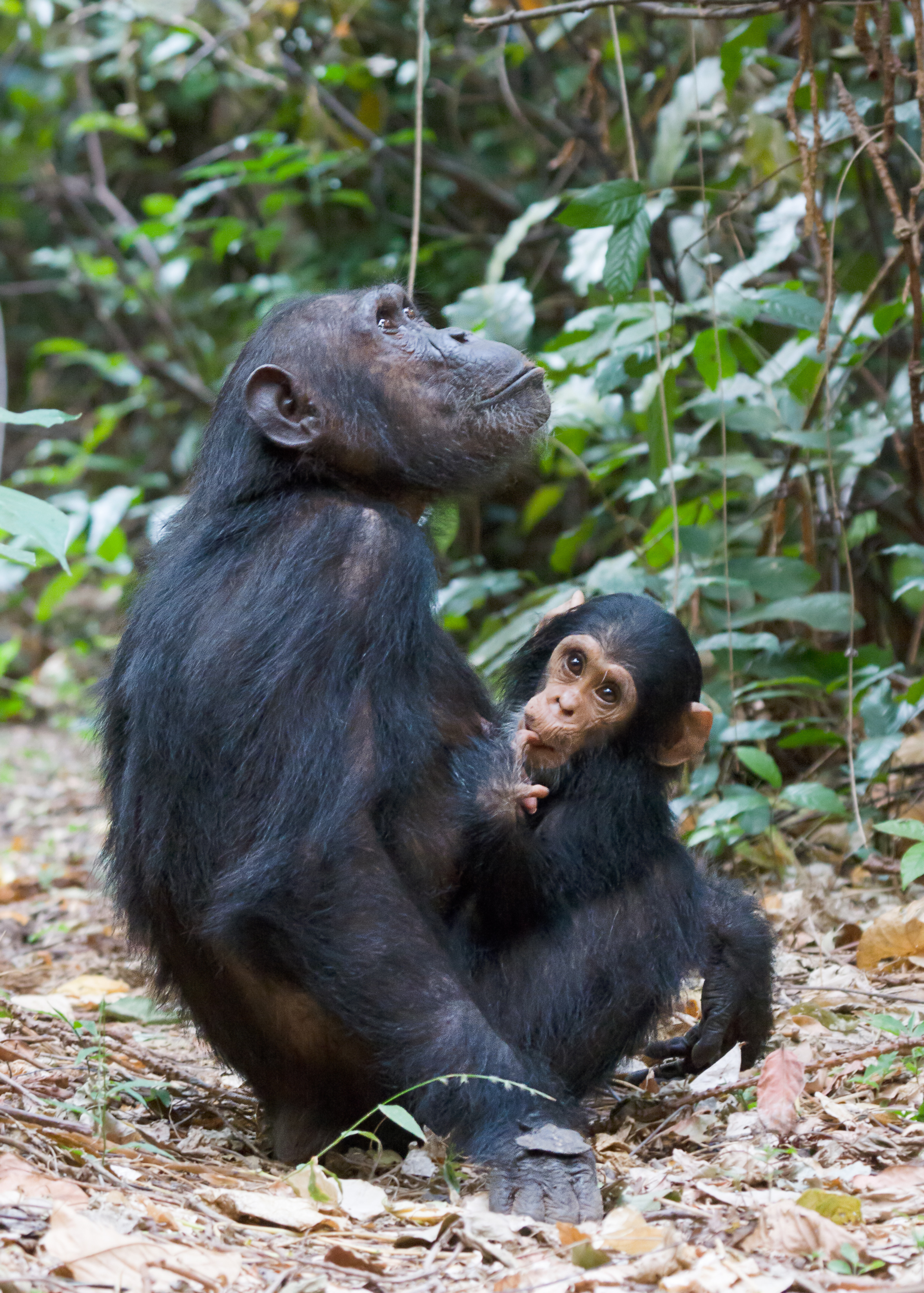
- Chimpanzee female with her baby in Gombe National Park

- Location within Tanzania
- Location: Tanzania, Kigoma Region, Kigoma District
- Nearest city: Kigoma City
- Coordinates: 4°40′00″S 29°38′00″E
- Area: 35 km^{2} (14 sq mi)
- Established: 1968
- Visitors: 1,854 (in 2012)
- Governing body: Tanzanian National Parks Authority
- Website: Park website

Gombe National Park (/ˈɡɒmbi, ˈɡoʊmbeɪ/) is a national park in Tanzania, located in the Kigoma District of the Kigoma Region. It was formerly called Gombe Stream National Park.

== Overview ==
Established in 1968, it is one of the smallest national parks in Tanzania, with only 35 km^{2} (13.5 sq mi) of protected land along the hills of the eastern shore of Lake Tanganyika. The terrain is distinguished by steep valleys, and the vegetation ranges from grassland to woodland to tropical rainforest. Accessible only by boat, the park is most famous as the location where Jane Goodall pioneered her behavioural research on the common chimpanzee populations. The Kasakela chimpanzee community, featured in several books and documentaries, lives in Gombe National Park.

== Wildlife ==
Gombe National Park encompasses grasslands, woodlands, steep valleys and tropical rainforest; it boasts one of the highest concentrations of primates in Africa. Chimpanzees share a habitat with several other primate species, beachcomber olive baboons, red colobus, red-tailed monkey, blue monkey and vervet monkey. Red-tailed monkeys and blue monkeys are known to hybridize in the area.

The leopard is one of the primary predators of chimpanzees, other primates and bushpigs. There are around 200 different bird species in the park, as well as hippopotamus, small antelopes and various snake species.

=== Jane Goodall's impact on Gombe ===
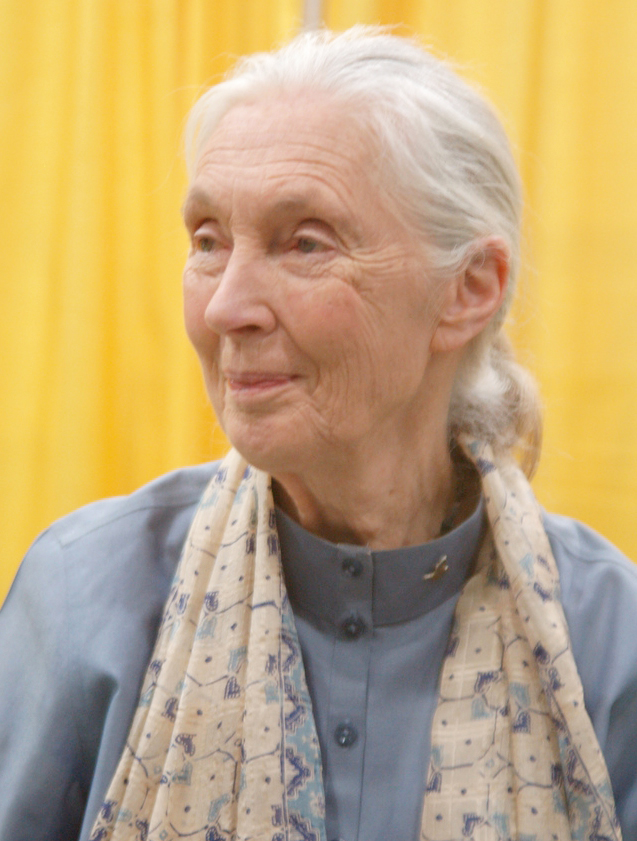
Jane Goodall

Gombe National Park is famous for being the site of Jane Goodall's groundbreaking research on chimpanzees and other primates. Goodall first travelled to Tanzania in 1960 at the age of 26 with no formal college training. Little was known about chimpanzee behaviour or community structure at the time. Her research eventually proved the intellectual and emotional sophistication of non-humans, chimpanzees in particular. With the support of renowned anthropologist Louis Leakey, Goodall set up a small research station in Gombe in hopes of learning more about the behaviour of our closest relatives. There she spent months tracking the elusive chimpanzee troops, particularly the Kasakela chimpanzee community, and observing their daily habits until she was slowly accepted by one troop and was allowed rare and intimate glimpses into chimpanzee society.

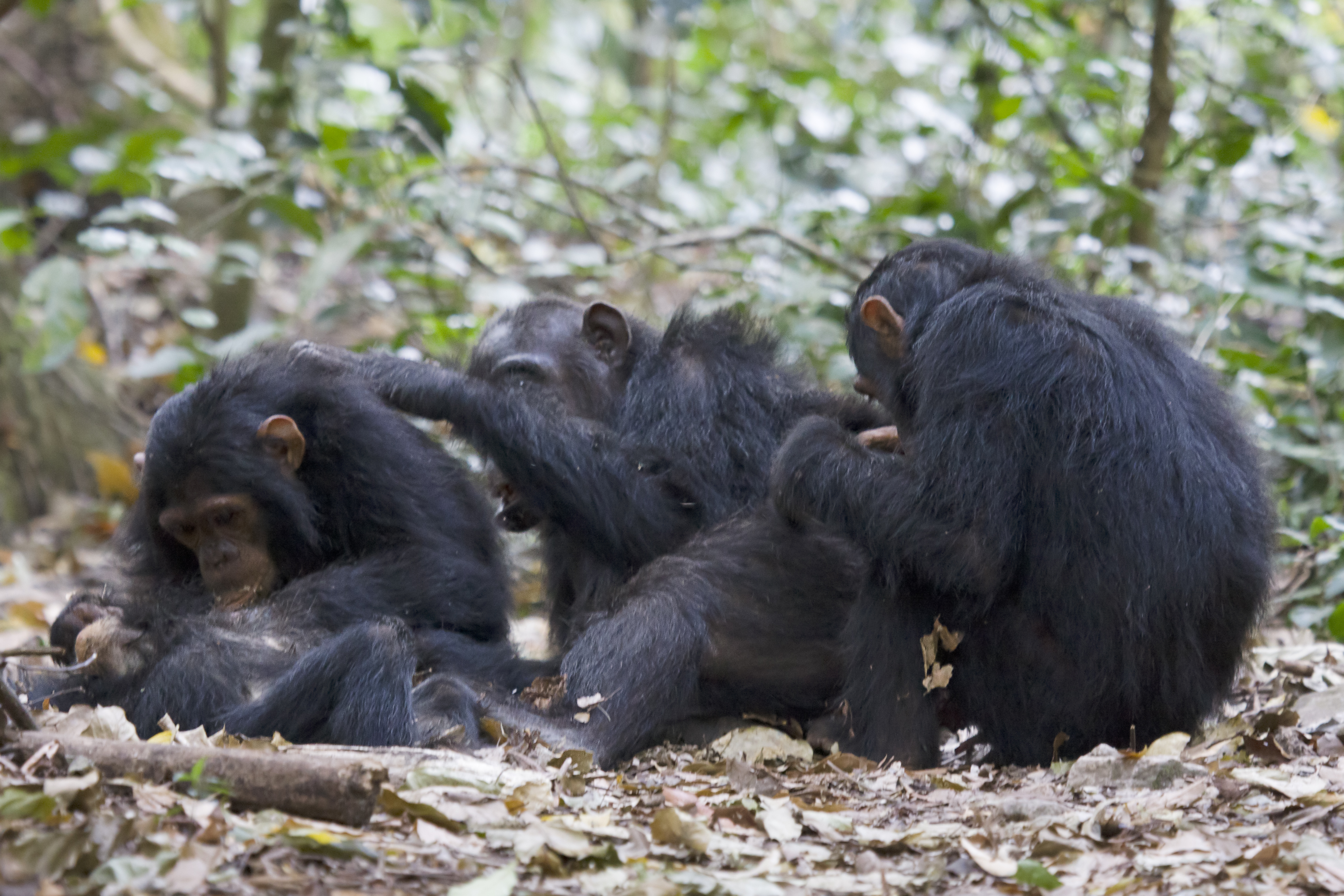
Social grooming of chimpanzees observed in Gombe National Park

Without college training directing her research, Goodall observed things that strict scientific doctrines may have overlooked. Instead of numbering the chimpanzees she observed, she gave them names such as Fifi and David Greybeard, and observed them to have unique and individual personalities, an unconventional idea at the time. She found that "it isn’t only human beings who have personality, who are capable of rational thought [and] emotions like joy and sorrow". She also observed behaviours such as hugs, kisses, pats on the back, and even tickling, what people consider identifiable human actions. Goodall insists that these gestures are evidence of “the close, supportive, affectionate bonds that develop between family members and other individuals within a community, which can persist throughout a life span of more than 50 years”.

Goodall’s research at Gombe is best known to the scientific community for challenging two long-standing beliefs of the day: that only humans could construct and use tools, and that chimpanzees were passive vegetarians. While observing one chimpanzee feeding at a termite mound, she watched him repeatedly place stalks of grass into termite holes, then remove them from the hole covered with clinging termites, effectively “fishing” for termites. The chimps would also take twigs from trees and strip off the leaves to make the twig more effective, a form of object modification which is the rudimentary beginnings of toolmaking. Humans had long distinguished ourselves from the rest of the animal kingdom as "Man the Toolmaker". In response to Goodall’s revolutionary findings, Louis Leakey wrote, "We must now redefine man, redefine tool, or accept chimpanzees as human!" Over the course of her study, Goodall found evidence of mental traits in chimpanzees such as reasoned thought, abstraction, generalization, symbolic representation, and even the concept of self, all previously thought to be uniquely human abilities.

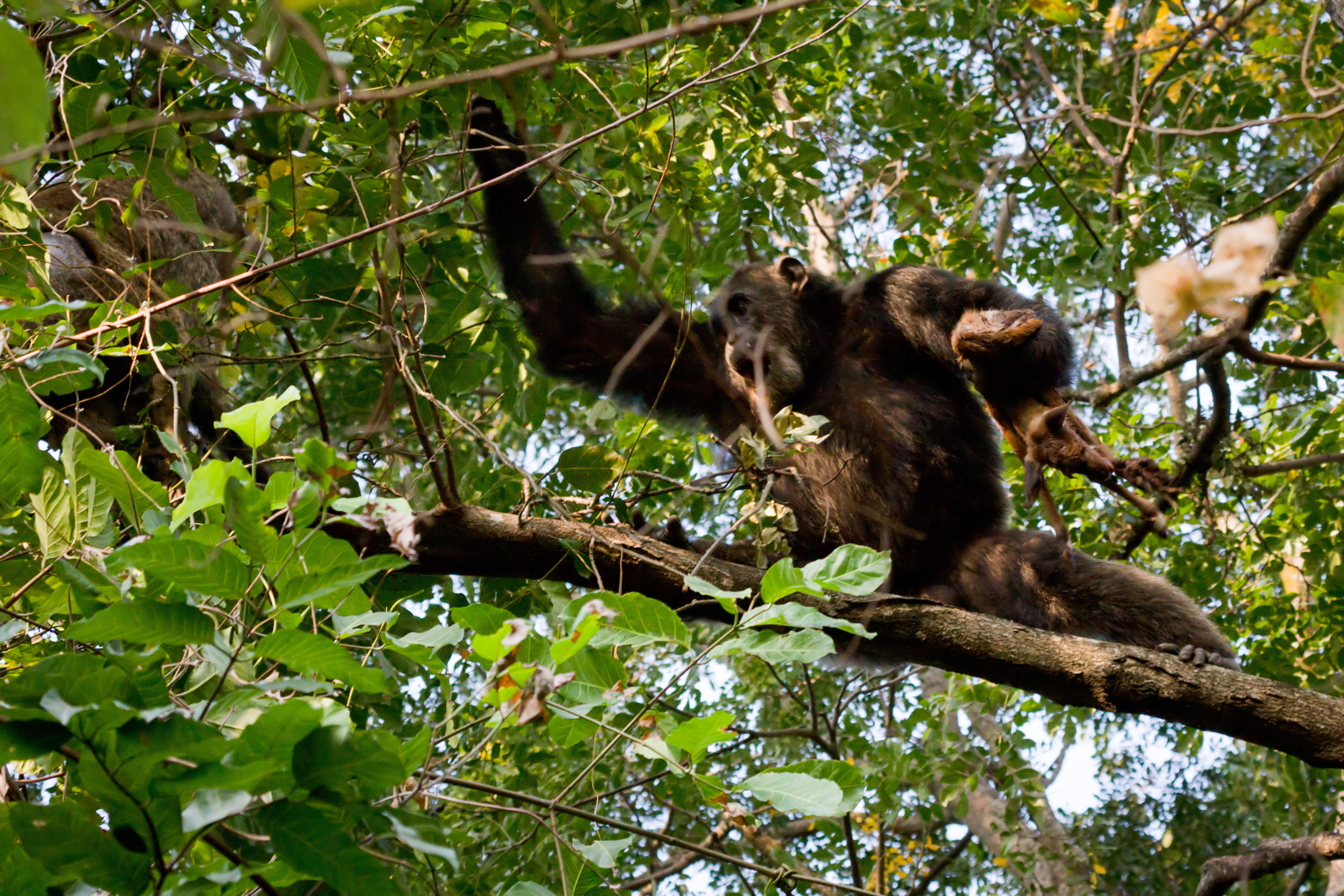
Hunting chimpanzee with prey

In contrast to the peaceful and affectionate behaviours she observed, Goodall also found an aggressive side of chimp nature at Gombe. She discovered that chimps will systematically hunt and eat smaller primates, such as red colobus. Goodall watched a hunting group isolate a colobus monkey high in a tree and block all possible exits, then one chimpanzee climbed up and captured and killed the colobus. The others then each took parts of the carcass, sharing with other members of the troop in response to begging behaviours. The chimps at Gombe kill and eat as much as one-third of the colobus population in the park each year. Goodall observed dominant females deliberately killing the young of other females in the troop in order to maintain their dominance, sometimes going so far as cannibalism.

=== Gombe Stream Research Centre ===
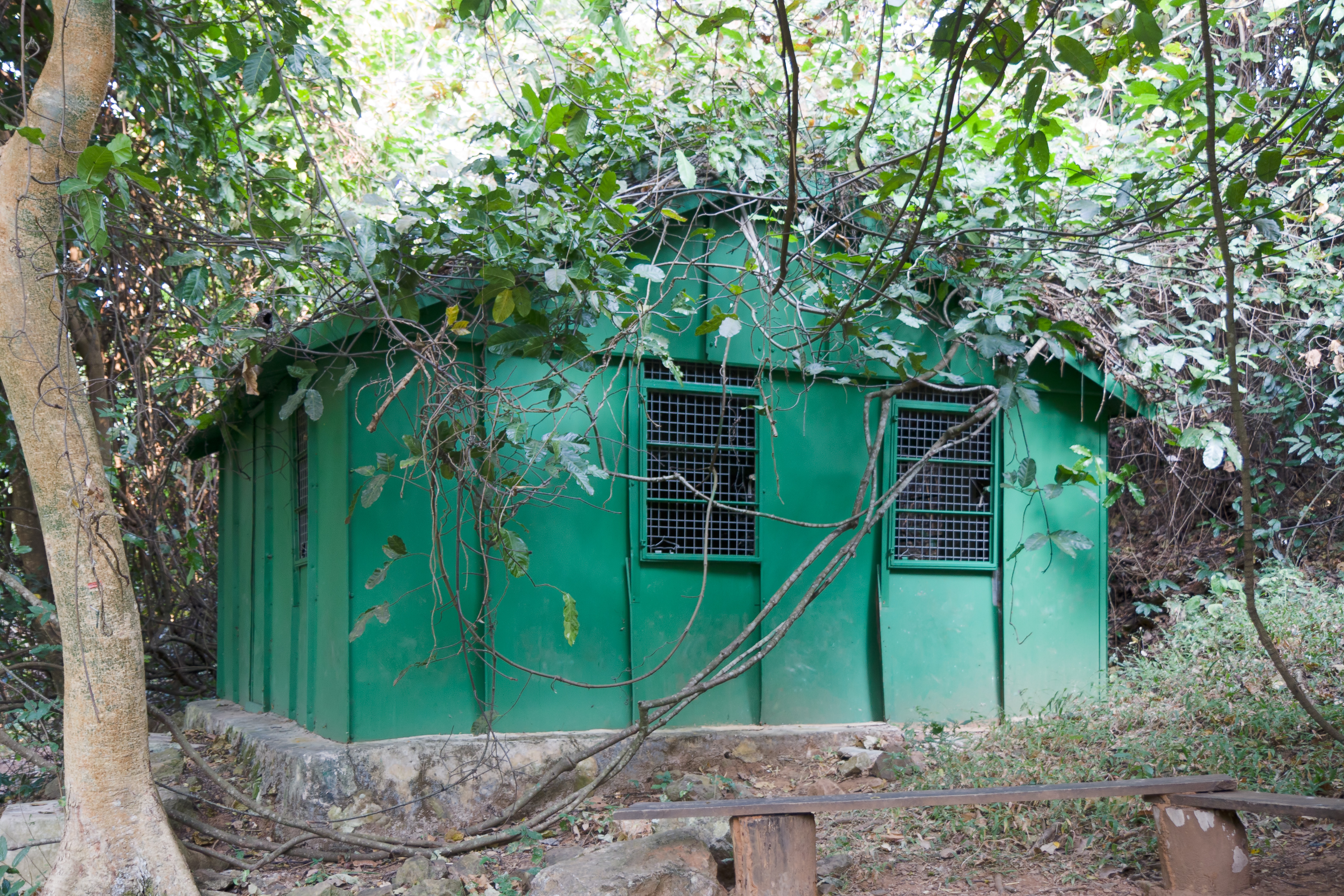
Feeding station where Jane Goodall used to feed the chimps

Goodall lived at Gombe almost full-time for fifteen years and the long-term data she accumulated is still of value to scientists today. In 1967, the Gombe Stream Research Centre (GSRC) was established to coordinate ongoing chimpanzee research in the park. Run mostly by a team of trained Tanzanians, the GSRC is the longest-running field study of an animal species in their natural surroundings, now over 60 years. This long-term data has provided scientists with insight into chimpanzee demographic patterns, male politics, hunting, culture and mother-infant relationships over multiple generations—rare and valuable data. The ongoing research is also providing information on the current threats to chimpanzees, such as disease, poaching, and habitat disturbance, which affect other species at Gombe as well. The research of Goodall has also drastically changed ethological thinking and how behavioural studies are conducted. Where once talk of animal emotion was dismissed as anthropomorphism, her observations of animals in their natural habitat show that societies, behaviour, and relationships between animals are quite complex. Her research of chimpanzee habitat (food and other requirements) also aid in improved design for new protected areas. The GSRC also conducts research on the baboon population, led by the Jane Goodall Center for Primate Studies.

== Conservation ==
The biodiversity of Gombe National Park is primarily threatened by human encroachment. Although 25% of Tanzania is set aside in parks and reserves, wildlife populations are still declining. This is mainly due to the lack of collaboration between park management, government sectors, and rural communities. Village lands often lie between parks and become obstacles for animals traveling between protected areas. Without incentives to protect the animals, rural communities will hunt them for food or kill them for safety reasons. Poverty also increases the demand.

== See also ==
- USC Jane Goodall Research Center
- List of protected areas of Tanzania
- Tanzania National Parks Authority
- Gombe Chimpanzee War
