= Jane Goodall Environmental Middle School =

Charter school in Salem, Oregon

Coordinates: 44.961811°N 122.998638°W

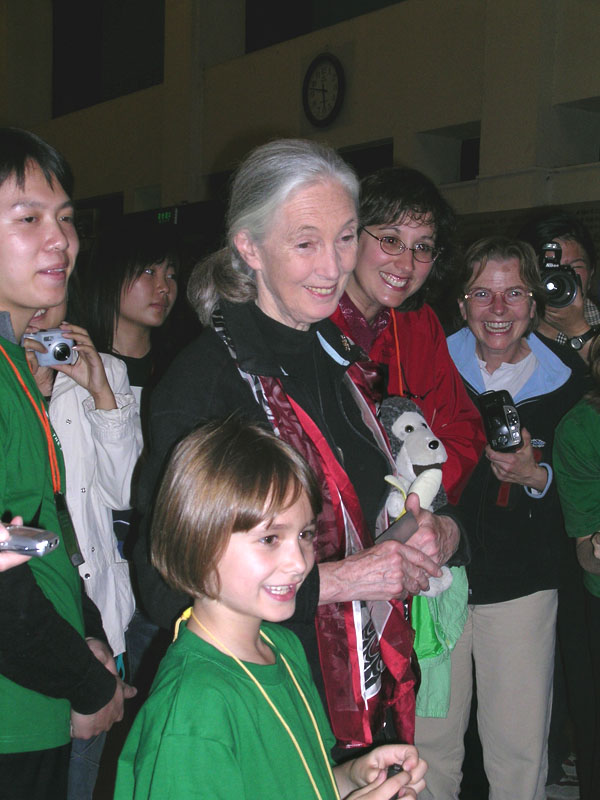
Primatologist Jane Goodall, the school's patron

Jane Goodall Environmental Middle School (JGEMS) is a public charter school serving grades six through eight that focuses on environmental science and community service. It is housed in the same building as the Oregon School for the Deaf in Salem, Oregon, and is named after English primatologist Jane Goodall. It is part of the Salem-Keizer School District.

== History ==
=== Background ===
In the 1990s, Waldo Middle School in Salem, Oregon, began offering the Roots & Shoots program as an after-school activity. The program was founded by Jane Goodall in 1991 as a way of teaching young people how to get involved in environmental issues.

In 1997, Waldo Middle School and science teacher Mike Weddle were awarded the Dr. Jane Goodall/Roots and Shoots Gold Award and recognised as one of the top four groups in the programme. Later that year, members of the group travelled to a summit of the Jane Goodall Institute in Brewster, New York.

=== Founding the school ===
In 2000, Weddle founded the Jane Goodall Environmental Magnet School (JGEMS) at Waldo Middle School. While intended as a magnet school, it was originally only open to students attending Waldo.

== Curriculum ==
The curriculum at JGEMS is aligned to current Oregon curriculum content standards and all courses taught in other Salem/Keizer middle schools are also taught at JGEMS. The curriculum at JGEMS consists of conservation biology, language arts, social studies, mathematics, integrated science, physical education/health education, and technology. If any student receives a F in any class before a field trip, they are not invited on that field trip. It is also very focused on science.

== School projects ==
JGEMS takes on environmental restoration projects and involves students in a variety of field studies. Projects are endangered species project, Oregon silverspot butterfly, reed canary grass suppression, frog deformities, amphibian monitoring, indefinite maintenance at Pringle Creek, macroinvertebrates census, Aumsville pond restoration, Little Pudding River restoration, forest fire severity, monitoring the movement of the heavy wood debris by tides and high water events at Siletz Bay National Wildlife Refuge, forest ecology at Opal Creek Education Center, and research on the snowy plover. As of the 2011–12 school year, all the endangered species are at the Oregon Zoo.
