= Jane Goodall Institute (Hong Kong) =

Charity for animals and the environment

- Formation: 2002
- Type: Non-profit organization
- Headquarters: Hong Kong
- Founder: Jane Goodall
- Website: www.janegoodall.org.hk

The Jane Goodall Institute (Hong Kong) (Chinese: 國際珍古德（香港）協會), founded in 2002, was established as a local registered charity involved in the promotion of the well-being of the community, animals and environment. The Jane Goodall Institute Hong Kong is one of the Asian branches of the Jane Goodall Institute which was founded in 1977 in California by Jane Goodall and Genevieve, Princess di San Faustino. With its headquarters in the US, the Jane Goodall Institute is a worldwide non-profit organization with 17 overseas offices.

== Objectives and missions ==
The objectives of the Institute are:

1. To promote the conservation of primate habitat.
2. To increase awareness, support and training on issues related to human relationships with one another, the environment, as well as other animals.
3. To expand non-invasive research programmes on chimpanzees and other primates.
4. To promote activities to ensure the well-being of chimpanzees, other primates and animals in general.

The Jane Goodall Institute's official statement of their mission:

"The Jane Goodall Institute advances the power of individuals to take informed and compassionate action to improve the environment of all living things."

== Funding ==
The Jane Goodall Institute (Hong Kong) depends on supports in the forms of donations, sponsorship, collaboration partnership.

However, the Institute declines to reveal specifically the individuals or organisations which have contributed to the funding.

== Comparison with other environmental organisations ==
In terms of mission, the Jane Goodall Institute has perhaps the most similar to that of WWF Hong Kong, as both organisations feature balanced focus on the environment and animals. While the Jane Goodall Institute is more inclined to the conservation of primates and other animals, Green Power focuses primarily on butterfly research and conservation, especially in the upcoming years. The objectives of Greenpeace are more general by comparison, as they aim to stop the climate change and to eliminate toxic chemicals. They put less emphasis on animal conservation, setting themselves apart from the Jane Goodall Institute. The Animals Asia Foundation has the most straightforward objective, as it aims to conserve animals exclusively. On the other hand, Green Power and the Jane Goodall Institute stress more on environmental education. Both organisations have set up the educational units Green School and Roots and Shoots, respectively. Furthermore, the Jane Goodall Institute, Greenpeace and WWF are global organisations, whereas Green Power and Animals Asia Foundation are Hong Kong-based.

== Roots & Shoots ==
Roots & Shoots is the global conservation and education programme founded by Dr. Jane Goodall, which serves as the core programme of Jane Goodall Institute.

It is the agenda of the programme to implement positive changes through education. Its objectives are to interact with the environment, to demonstrate care and compassion for animals and all lifeforms, to establish a better understanding among different cultures, ethnic groups, religions, socio-economic classes and nations. It also aims to assist young people to develop as confident and positive individuals.

=== Origin of the name ===
Literally, roots and shoots mean:

- root - the part of the plant which grows down into the earth to obtain water and food and which holds the plant firmly in the ground.
- shoot- the first part of a plant to appear above the earth from a seed, or any new growth on an already existing plant.

A deeper connotation of Roots & Shoots is:

- roots lead to a strong and firm foundation
- shoots seem infinitesimal in their unending pursuit of sunlight.

By bonding, they can break through the brick walls, a metaphorical representation of the problems human beings suffer from globally.

=== The history of Roots & Shoots ===
Roots & Shoots began with 16 students who were interested in animals and environment conservation. However, they realised they were not able to obtain sufficient support and resources they would need from school. They, therefore, went to meet Dr. Goodall on her front porch in Dar es Salaam, Tanzania in 1991. After a deep conversation, they returned to school and began to look for like-minded students to realise their goals. The Roots & Shoots programme was then born. Now there are more than 4500 groups around the world in over 70 countries, including more than 7 countries in Asia, such as Hong Kong, China, Japan, Taiwan, Singapore, Korea and Malaysia.

=== Projects by Roots & Shoots (Hong Kong) ===
- Monkey Conservation Ambassador Programme

A programme open to tertiary students in order to raise the awareness of Hong Kong's wild macaques in Country Parks, as well as to cut down complaints, attacks and illegal feeding.

- Pollution in Hong Kong

The Roots and Shoots group aims to raise public awareness of problems from air, water and land pollutions in Hong Kong. The group also aims to help solve these problems by raising funds.

- Human impact on the environment

The Guardians of the Earth aims to investigate how humans are affecting their natural environment. They started their projects by observing man-made objects and human activities in relation to the environment.

- Care for animals

The Roots and Shoots group from the Tack Ching Primary School held a campaign of animal care. Activities include visiting the Society for the Prevention of Cruelty to Animals (SPCA) Wanchai Centre and fund-raising for the SPCA. The group also collected used towels and toys for abandoned dogs at SPCA.

- Care for Hong Kong's environment

Roots and Shoots members from various schools and communities joined hands at the Beach Cleaning Day at Sha Chau & Lung Kwu Chau Marine Park. They also organized a Chinese white dolphin boat trip.

- Care for Hong Kong's community and environment

Roots and Shoots members joined some scout members in an activity in which they learned the skills of planting. The 'Shoots of Hope' were sent to Hong Kong School For The Deaf and Methodist Yang Center.

- Roots & Shoots Day 2002

(with photos and a brief description of the activity in Chinese)

=== Membership in Hong Kong ===
Among the more than 4500 groups around the world in over 70 countries, members of Roots and Shoots in Hong Kong include students from local primary and secondary schools, such as the Hong Kong International School, Hong Kong's Victoria Shanghai Academy and Tack Ching Primary School.

=== Books related to Roots & Shoots ===
- Chinese version - 根與芽－改變世界的起點
- 根與芽(兒童繪本)
