= Schmidt's Naturals =

American personal care company

- Formerly: Schmidt's Deodorant Company
- Industry: Personal Care
- Founded: 2015
- Fate: Acquired by Unilever (2017)
- Headquarters: Portland, Oregon, United States
- Key people: Jaime Schmidt (Co-Founder & CEO 2010-2017; Spokesperson 2017-present); Michael Cammarata (Co-Founder 2015-2017; CEO 2017-2019); Ryu Yokoi (CEO, 2019-present)
- Products: Personal Care & Home Products
- Parent: Unilever
- Website: schmidts.com

Schmidt's Deodorant Company, LLC (dba Schmidt's Naturals) is an American personal care company based in Portland, Oregon. A subsidiary of Unilever, Schmidt's Naturals manufactures and sells plant and mineral-based personal care products including natural deodorant, soap, and toothpaste.

== History ==
In 2011 Jaime Schmidt, a mother and social worker in Portland, Oregon, began making personal care products in her kitchen. Over the next 4 years, Schmidt sold her products at farmers’ markets and co-ops around Portland, eventually gaining shelf space at a regional Whole Foods. By 2014, Schmidt had refined her all-natural product line down to five deodorant scents, all sold in small glass jars with an applicator.

=== Investment ===
In late 2014, Schmidt accepted investor Michael Cammarata's offer to invest in her company in exchange for equity. In January 2015, the new partners, Cammarata and Schmidt officially formed Schmidt's Deodorant Company, LLC.

=== Growth ===
Over the next two years, Schmidt and Cammarata grew the new company rapidly from 4 employees to over 160: moving from a 1,200-square-foot space to a 5,000-square-foot (460 m^{2}) facility and then into one almost three times that size. During this time, with Cammarata focused on the business and Schmidt on the product, the company introduced new formulations, produced a stick variation, and rebranded.

In 2016, Schmidt's launched an exclusive partnership with its first big retailer Target.com and was named Manufacturer of the Year in the small company category by the Portland Business Journal. By late 2016, Schmidt's had grown to almost 50 employees and offered 10 stick deodorants and 6 jar formulations. As the naturals segment continued to grow, Schmidt's Deodorant Company attracted the attention of large retailers.

=== Rebrand ===
In June 2017, Schmidt and Cammarata were named Pacific NorthWest Entrepreneurs of the Year by EY (formerly Ernst & Young). In September, they introduced a line of plant and mineral-based soaps, rebranding the company as Schmidt's Naturals; in November, they released toothpastes. By late 2017, the company had scaled to 120 employees with a 30,000 square-foot facility in Portland, Oregon and customer support center in Florida.

== Unilever acquisition ==
In December 2017, after months of negotiation by Schmidt and Cammarata, Unilever, acquired Schmidt's Naturals for an undisclosed sum. After the acquisition, Cammarata became Chief Executive Officer of Schmidt's Naturals and Schmidt continued on as brand spokesperson. Following the Unilever acquisition, the company broadened its product line with the introduction of body wash, mouthwash, and home care products. Between January and August 2018, with Cammarata at the helm, Schmidt's Naturals grew by 300% in sales.

In August 2018, Schmidt's Naturals partnered with Cammarata's family friend, Jane Goodall to develop the special edition deodorant scent “Lily of the Valley” with 5% of the proceeds going to the Jane Goodall Institute. In May 2019, Schmidt's announced a collaboration with pop star Justin Bieber to create a new deodorant called “Here + Now,” which was designed for sensitive skin. The company also started using an AI platform, Alexander, to handle its customer services and to collect data. In July 2019, Schmidt's Naturals began selling deodorant products with hemp seed oil, including Rose + Black Pepper and Sage + Vetiver. In July 2019, Michael Cammarata left the company and Unilever executive Ryu Yokoi transitioned to chief executive officer.
