= Alexander Reichstein =

Russian-Finnish artist

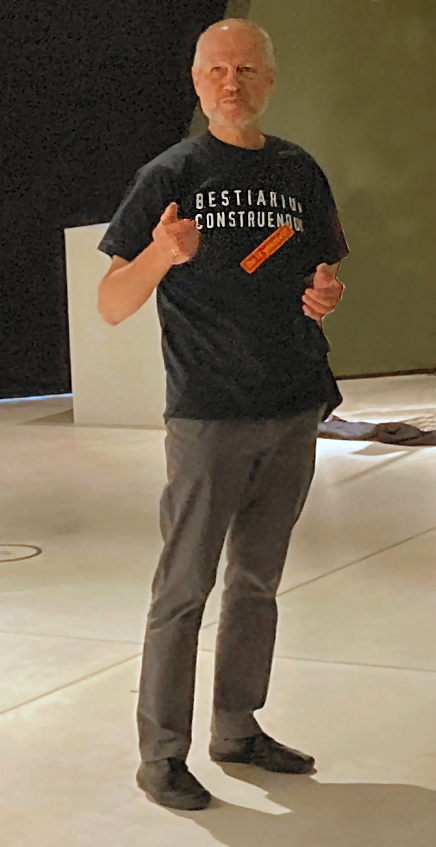
Alexander Reichstein, 2021

Alexander Reichstein (born 1957 in Moscow) is a Russian-Finnish artist, illustrator and designer. His work focuses on art for children through interactive exhibition projects, sculptures and book illustrations.

== Biography and work ==
Alexander Reichstein was born into a Russian-Jewish family. His father Alexander D. Reichstein was a linguist for the German language and his mother Elena Mikhelevich was a translator and teacher. In 1974 he graduated from Children's Art School No. 2 in Moscow. From 1974 to 1977 Reichstein worked as an artist in a Moscow film studio. Between 1977 and 1981 he drew illustrations for Moscow publishers. In 1981 he married the linguist Ekaterina Protassova. The couple have two children.

From 1976 to 1982 Reichstein studied print media design and illustration at the Moscow Polygraphic Institute, today's Moscow State University of Printing. During his studies he specialized in the illustration of children's books. He then worked for various Moscow publishers, where he designed and illustrated books for children and adults. From 1982 he worked for three years as art director at the Russian art publisher Iskusstvo.

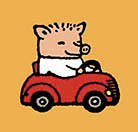
Illustration figure Porosenok Petr from Alexander Reichstein

In 1990 Reichstein went with his family to Helsinki in Finland. From 1991 to 1993 Reichstein completed an internship at the Aalto University School of Arts, Design and Architecture in Helsinki. There he held two two-year visiting professorships, first in 1992 and again in 2006.

Reichstein conducts workshops, happenings, exhibitions and installations and gives art courses in Finland. On behalf of museums, he is responsible for the exhibition design, for example in 2020 for the 75th anniversary of the Moomins figures by the Finnish-Swedish writer Tove Jansson at the National Museum of Finland. He also llustrates children's books for international publishers.

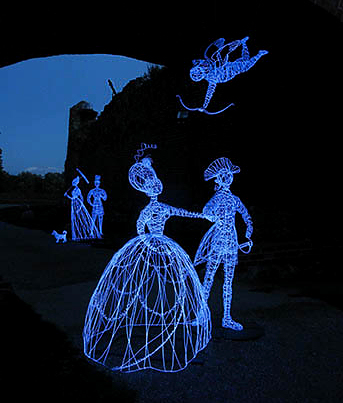
Figures of Light art They were here from Alexander Reichstein

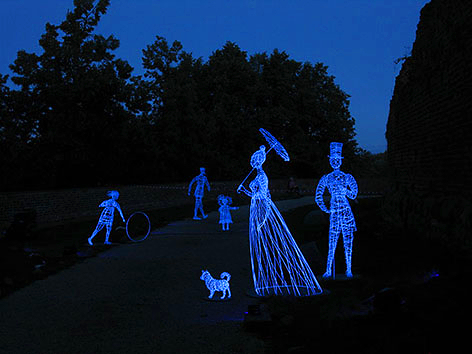
More characters from They were here

Reichstein is also active as a Light artist. In 2016 he created his work They were here(also referred as Mystical Guests), which was first shown in Helsinki and then also in other countries such as Germany, France, Poland, the Netherlands, Lithuania and Latvia. In 2019 Reichstein took part in the Berlin Festival of Lights with the light art works They were here, Time to Fly and Metamorphoses, which were shown in the Erholungspark Marzahn in the Marzahn district. In 2021 he took part in the FestungsLeuchten light art festival at Ehrenbreitstein Fortress in Koblenz with his light art installation They were here.

=== Main works ===
Reichstein had a breakthrough in the public perception of his art in 2004 with the interactive exhibition Bestiarium Construendum, which is one of his major works. It was first shown at the Amos Anderson Art Museum in Helsinki. It is a hands-on exhibition made of large building blocks, which are shaped like parts of the human body and animals. These include lions, crocodiles, fish and horses. Because of their color and surface, the parts look antique and appear like relics of bygone cultures. The museum visitors can, by piecing together the building blocks, create sculptures of mythical creatures.

Bestiarium Construendum

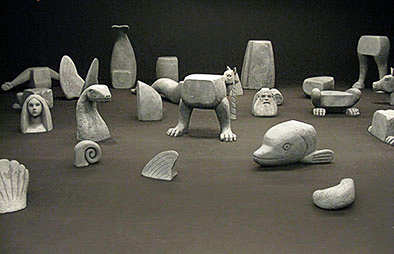
The individual parts of the interactive exhibition Bestiarium Construendum

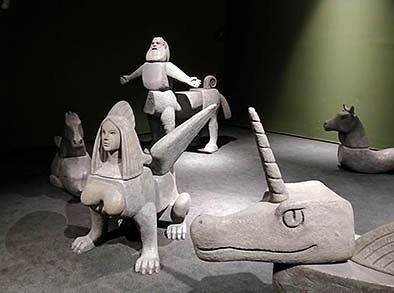
Several created figures

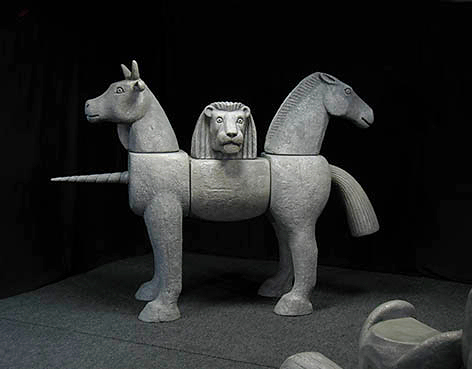
Figure assembled from the individual parts

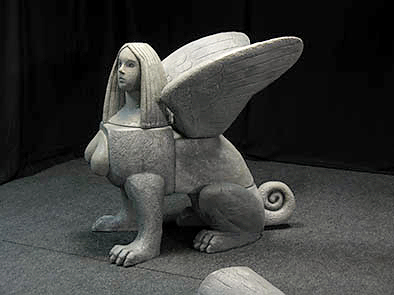
Another composite figure

Another major work is Mare Nocturnum, a sculpture installation on the mysticism of the deep sea. It was first seen on a former water tower in Kotka in 2002, and it was also seen in the caves of the Retretti Art Center in 2004. The installation consists of three-dimensional figures made from wire mesh which are sprayed with a color that fluoresces blue in UV light at night. The figures are three-dimensional and include mermaids, merfolk, hippocamps and tritons moving in the underwater world.

In 2005 he created Alma Terra in the form of a 40 square meter model patchwork landscape made of fabric. Children can play with and crawl on it. The landscape is reminiscent of that which in Russia is revered as Mother Earth, and which is also known in the mythologies of other countries.

== Classification ==
According to Finnish art historian and journalist Marjatta Hietaniemi, Alexander Reichstein helped expand Finnish children's culture over the years. He introduced interactivity and made it an artistic genre. In addition, he brought Eastern European influences into Finnish children's book illustration. She rates Reichstein's style in varying ways. Reichstein reproduced and adapted those styles from history to fit how he needed for a work or an exhibition. This is the case with the Bestiarium Construendum project, for example, using archaic Greek, with the installation Mare Nocturnum using the Renaissance, and with the project Princess for One Day using Baroque and Rococo styles.

== Book illustrations (selection) ==
- 1997 Gondwanan lapset (swedish: På en ö i havet) (Author: Alexis Kouros)
- 1997 Tupsu, the squirrel who was afraid (Author: Melody Carlson)
- 1998 Mina & Bär (Author: Sabine Jörg)
- 1999 Parzival auf der Suche nach dem Gral, Reseal of Wolfram von Eschenbach, (Author: Marit Laurin)
- 1999 Rodolfo kommt (Author: Udo Weigelt)
- 2000 The Eagle & the Wren (Author: Jane Goodall)
- 2002 Porosenok Petr (Author: Lyudmila Petrushevskaya)
- 2015 När månen skrattade (Author: Milena Parland)

== Publications ==
- Alexander Reichstein: Ihmeotuksia & Ihmemuutoksia (Curious Creatures & Changes), Salo/Vaasa, 2007, ISBN 978-952-99735-6-9
- Alexander Reichstein: Selected exhibitions & installations, Helsinki, 2019, ISBN 978-952-94-2264-7

== Awards ==
- 1997: Finlandia Junior, young talent award for books for children and young people
- 1998: Topelius-anniversary medal
- 2008: Finnish State Prize for Children's Culture
- 2016: Prize from the Swedish Literary Society in Finland

== Bibliography ==
- Alexander Reichstein skapar konst för lek och drömmar in: Opsis Barnkultur, 2/2017, S. 35–38 (swedish)
