= Roberts High School (disambiguation) =

Roberts High School may refer to:

- Owen J. Roberts High School, Pottstown, Pennsylvania
- Roberts High School, Salem, Oregon
- Roberts High School, Roberts, Montana
- Roberts High School, a former high school in Roberts, Illinois
