= Melody Horrill =

Journalist and media manager

Melody Horrill (who was born in the United Kingdom in 1968 and emigrated to Australia in 1976) is a journalist, former TV presenter and media/communications manager. She is the author of a memoir A Dolphin Called Jock (Allen and Unwin 2022) which details how she discovered trust and love through an appreciation of nature through her remarkable friendship with a wild dolphin called Jock in Adelaide's Port River. The interaction helped her move past a childhood and youth dominated by domestic violence. She is now a passionate advocate for the dolphins of the Port River.

== Early life and dolphin volunteer work ==
Horrill emigrated from England to South Australia with her family as a young child, growing up in a challenging family environment. In April 2021, Horrill penned an article for the Weekend Australian magazine, where she recounted a difficult childhood with domestic abuse

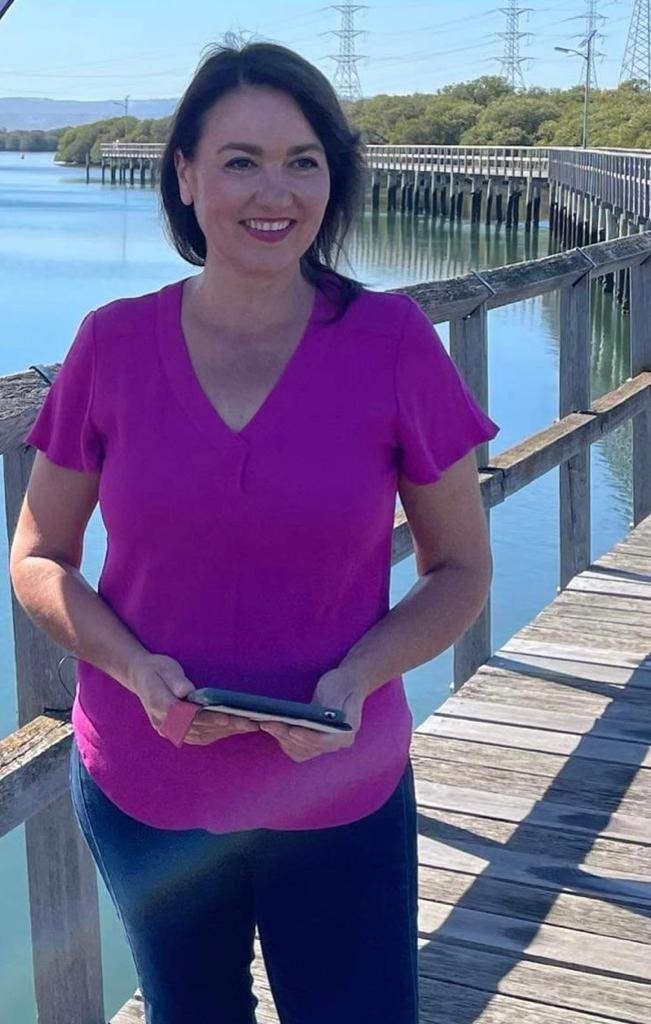
Melody Horrill at Port River, Adelaide, in 2022

At university, Horrill began doing voluntary work with Adelaide's Port River dolphins, encouraged by lecturer Mike Bossley. They, together with some other students, went on to form the then-Australian Dolphin Research Foundation to help protect and promote awareness of the dolphins. As she developed her media career, Horrill created a dolphin sponsorship program, secured TV sponsorship and raised community awareness across South Australia through ongoing media stories. She organised school and community group visits and worked with a SA bakery to secure a sponsorship agreement where bread carried a picture of a rare albino dolphin.

Horrill also produced a documentary, Dance with a Dolphin, about a solitary Port Diver dolphin called Jock, which she then took to CNN International – it was aired across the world. The work of the Foundation and the documentary helped convince the then-State Government to declare the Adelaide Dolphin Sanctuary in 2005.

== Media career ==
Horrill made her small screen debut in 1995 on a Channel 10 wine show, before moving to Whyalla for a reporting gig with Central Television (now Southern Cross Television), and then becoming a freelance journalist at ABC-TV in Adelaide. Next, she worked for Nine as the environment reporter, before making the switch to Ten. She reported for the local and national news, and also produced a number of environmental documentaries focusing on South Australian environmental issues, including the dolphin documentary. These documentaries were shown on both the Network Ten and internationally on CNN. In a 2020 interview, she described that experience: “CNN Atlanta picked up one and flew me over to the US to present it to an international audience. It resulted in the formation of Australia's first Dolphin Sanctuary in the Port River – perhaps my proudest moment.”

In 2004 Horrill joined Seven News in Adelaide, where she was both a weather presenter and reporter until late 2013 when she decided not to renew her contract to “explore new horizons”. After a period in Darwin where she worked as a media consultant, she joined 3AW in Melbourne, and then the Australian Bureau of Meteorology as a media and communications manager assisting in natural emergencies such as the 2019/20 bushfires.

Her concern for the declining dolphin population in the Port River led her to write the Weekend Australian article mentioned above and undertake a number of other media interviews, including ABC Adelaide and Melbourne's 3AW to highlight the dolphin situation and the need for more research and more protection to address the issues. In her article and interviews, she described how in her case, the connection to the dolphins had healed her as a person following her traumatic childhood.

== Publication of personal memoir, other books, and other recent work ==
In May 2022, Australian publishers Allen & Unwin published Horrill's personal memoir, entitled A Dolphin called Jock. The book describes her childhood and youth dealing with extreme domestic violence and tells how her relationship with a wild, solitary dolphin called Jock and the other dolphins of the Port River helped her recover from these traumatic experiences. A Dolphin called Jock was republished in September 2023 by Canada-based Greystone Books in 2023 under the title The Dolphin who Saved Me in the American, Canadian and United Kingdom markets. Her book was endorsed by world-renowned ethologist and environmentalist, Dr Jane Goodall DBE. Horrill and Jock's story was also featured in British actor Martin Clunes's book Meetings with Remarkable Animals, published in December 2024.

As of January 2025, Horrill had penned two more books, including a young adult fiction titled ‘A Cat Called Q and the Magic Globe’, published by 12 Willows Press. The book follows the adventures of Sheri, a young girl who struggles with self-confidence and trauma from bullying and her quest to save a mythical realm and its animals from environmental ruin. The feline hero of the book is based on Horrill's rescue cat called Q. Her third book, titled Sheltered, published by Ultimo Press, is non-fiction and features a series of stories about rescue animals around Australia. The book focuses on how the animals ultimately rescue the people who save them. Sheltered was again endorsed by Dr Jane Goodall DBE and also by Lady Primrose Potter A.C.

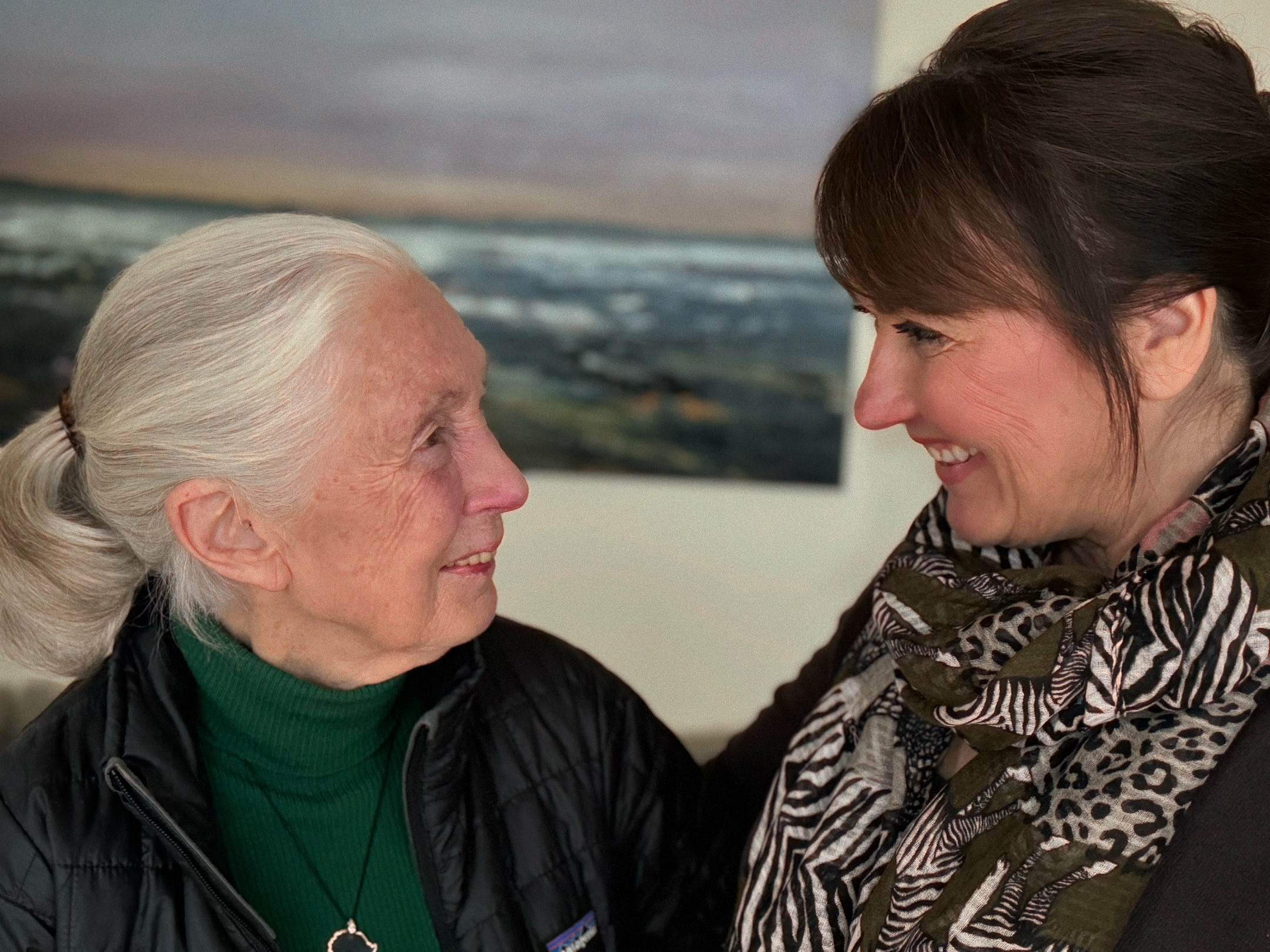
Jane Goodall (left) and Melody Horrill, photographed in Australia in 2024

Horrill is co-chair of the Jane Goodall Institute's international Cetacean Committee. On August 21, 2023, Horrill, speaking for the JGI committee, commented on the recent death of the orca Tokitae (Lolita). Horrill said:

"We are devastated that Tokitae will never receive what she was entitled to from the start – her freedom. Her death is a tragic reminder that no dolphins, whales, or porpoises should ever be kept in captivity for the purpose of entertainment. These highly intelligent, sensitive mammals deserve a natural life in the wild, free of exploitation."

Horrill is also an Ambassador for the Kangaroo/Victor Harbor Dolphin Watch and Retired Police Dogs SA.
