= Artipoppe =

Dutch luxury babywearing brand

- Type: Label
- Industry: Luxury Fashion, Babywearing
- Founded: 2012
- Founder: Anna van den Bogert
- Headquarters: Netherlands
- Owner: Bugaboo International B.V. (since 2022)
- Website: artipoppe.com

Artipoppe (/ɑr.tiˈpɑp.ɛ/) is a Dutch luxury babywearing brand founded in 2012 and owned by Bugaboo International B.V. with headquarters in Amsterdam and Lexmond. Artipoppe specializes in baby carriers, baby wraps, and ring slings.

== History ==
Artipoppe was founded by Anna van den Bogert and inspired by her experience of motherhood and search for functional yet stylistically elevated baby carriers. From 2012 to 2018, the brand produced baby wraps and ring slings, expanding in 2018 with the Zeitgeist Baby Carrier, all recognized by the International Hip Dysplasia Institute for being “hip-healthy.” Artipoppe's philosophy, inspired by van den Bogert's concept of “The New Motherhood,” emphasizes freedom, self-expression, and authentic parenting. The company built a global community through its Artipoppe Newsletter, Artipoppe Playlist, and Artipoppe Podcast, which feature notable guests and cover diverse topics such as motherhood, health, wellness, style, spirituality, and social issues.

== Collaborations ==
Global celebrities such as Sienna Miller, Chrissy Teigen, Gigi Hadid, Emily Ratajkowski, and Hilary Duff use/used Artipoppe. The brand's Zeitgeist Baby Carrier is often featured in Vogue and similar publications as a must-have for parents. In 2021, Tiffany Norris, known as the Mommy Concierge to the Royal Family, highlighted Artipoppe and the exclusivity of the Zeitgeist Argus Bolivar in vicuña and silk. Over the years, the brand partnered with different individuals and brands to release custom, limited-edition products. This includes The Rolling Stones Baby Carrier, launched through a collaborative partnership with Bergdorf Goodman to celebrate the legendary band's No Filter Tour. Artipoppe also partnered with Dr. Jane Goodall for the popular Jane Goodall x Artipoppe Zeitgeist Baby Carrier, from which 10% of worldwide sales go yearly to the Jane Goodall Institute. The brand often collaborates with contemporary artists, such as a Sweden-based artist, Joséphine Klerks, and U.S. artist, Meagan Boyd. Moreover, as part of its broader sustainability mission, Artipoppe collaborates with a non-profit, One Tree Planted, to mitigate its environmental impact by offsetting carbon emissions through reforestation efforts.
