= Derek Bryceson =

Tanzanian politician (1922–1980)

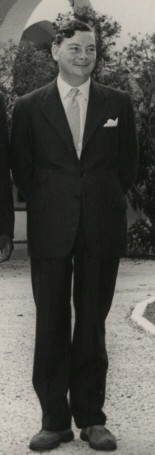
Bryceson in the 1950s

Derek Noel MacLean Bryceson (December 31, 1922 – October 1, 1980) was a British-Tanzanian politician best known as the second husband of Jane Goodall.

== Early life ==
Bryceson was educated in St. Paul's School, London. In 1939 he joined the Royal Air Force, where he flew a Hawker Hurricane. When he was 19, he was shot down over Egypt; he was told that his injuries meant he would never walk again, but he nonetheless regained a substantial degree of mobility.

He subsequently attended Cambridge University, where he studied agricultural science; in 1946, he moved to Kenya Colony, where he started a farm and married Bobbie Littleton, and in 1952 he and Littleton moved to Tanganyika Territory, where they farmed at the base of Mount Kilimanjaro as part of a white community in the settlement of Ol Molog, in Moshi.

== Political career ==
Bryceson's farm brought him in contact with Julius Nyerere, whom he befriended, and he became one of "the earliest white supporters of Nyerere's political vision for a democratic, multiracial African society." Upon entering politics, he moved to Dar es Salaam, where he built a house on the beach; Nyerere liked the house so much that he chose to build a house next door, and when he applied for a loan to finance the house's construction, Bryceson accompanied him to the bank.

In 1957, Bryceson was appointed Assistant Minister of Social Services by Edward Twining. In this position, he made allies in local trade unions. In 1958, he resigned so that he could run for office, but developed severe jaundice and asked a friend to run in his place; the friend, who was also white, agreed, but then discovered that the local electorate preferred Bryceson, and so "rather than lose this African support for a European," Bryceson ran despite his health issues.

He was elected to the Parliament of Tanganyika, representing the constituency of Kinondoni. He served as deputy leader of the opposition, and when Nyerere became Prime Minister, he was the only white member of Nyerere's cabinet; science writer Dale Peterson has stated that Bryceson was "for many years the only freely elected white person in all of Postcolonial Africa". The New York Times subsequently noted that he had been "Tanzania's longest-serving white Member of Parliament and government official."

In July 1959, he was made Minister for Mines and Commerce (although the Historical Dictionary of Tanzania states that this position was unofficial) and then served as Nyerere's Minister of Health and Labour; after Nyerere resigned in 1962 and was succeeded by Rashidi Kawawa, Kawawa made Bryceson his Minister of Agriculture.

He was re-elected in the 1965 Tanzanian general election.

== Jane Goodall ==
Bryceson first met Jane Goodall in 1967, when he visited the Gombe Stream Research Centre in his capacity as Minister of Agriculture.

By 1972, Bryceson had left electoral politics and become Tanzania's Director of National Parks. In this position, he again met Goodall when she joined a group requesting the creation of a national park encompassing the Gombe Stream area.

Dale Peterson, who edited two volumes of Goodall's correspondence, has noted that Goodall's "first love letter" to Bryceson is dated August 15, 1972, and posited that their relationship began earlier that summer. In late December 1973 or early January 1974, Bryceson and Goodall survived a plane crash together, after which they decided that they no longer wished to conceal their relationship. Goodall and her first husband, Hugo van Lawick, divorced in August 1974, and Bryceson and Littleton divorced soon after; by February 1975, Bryceson and Goodall were married.

== Death ==
In June 1980, Bryceson began experiencing stomach pain, and was diagnosed with cancer which "had already spread". After surgical treatment was of limited efficacy, Goodall contacted Hepzibah Menuhin, who recommended that Bryceson become a patient of Hans Nieper in Hanover. Nieper treated Bryceson with laetrile.

While undergoing treatment, Bryceson began writing an autobiography, but died on October 1. He was subsequently cremated, and his ashes were scattered in the waters off Dar es Salaam.
