= Salem-Keizer School District =

School district in Oregon, United States

Salem-Keizer Public Schools, District 24J

Location
- Salem and Keizer, Oregon United States

District information
- Type: Public
- Grades: K–12
- Established: January 1855
- Superintendent: Andrea Castañeda
- Budget: $683 million (general fund)

Students and staff
- Students: 39,376 (2022–23)
- Teachers: 2,242.18
- Staff: 1,552.31

Other information
- Schedule: September through mid-June
- Website: www.salkeiz.k12.or.us

Salem-Keizer School District (24J) is a school district in the U.S. state of Oregon that serves the cities of Salem and Keizer. It is the second-largest school district in the state with approximately 40,000 students and nearly 4,000 full-time equivalent (FTE) employees. It serves more than 172 square miles (450 km^{2}) of Marion and Polk counties.

== Overview ==
In 2009, 18% of students received English Language Learner services, 17% received Special Education, and 8% were in the Talented and Gifted Program. 59% of students were in the Free and Reduced Meal Program, indicating a high percentage of students living in poverty.

In 2008, Salem-Keizer high school students scored above the national average on the SATs. In 2009, 65% of high school students graduated with a high school diploma.

As of 2009, Salem-Keizer was a growing district with a 6% enrollment growth in the previous six years (37,877 in 2003–04 to 40,282 in 2008–09). The district's facilities include 73 schools and programs in 69 locations. The average age of schools is 45 years for elementary, 32 years for middle, and 32 years for high schools.

== School board ==
The Salem-Keizer School Board is responsible for hiring the superintendent, adopting the annual budget, and negotiating collective bargaining agreements with District staff. The seven-person board serves as an advocate on behalf of the Salem-Keizer School District, students and its constituency. All board meetings, except for executive sessions, are open to the public, and time is set aside for public comments. School board elections are held in May as members' four-year terms expire.

Though the district is broken up into zones for which one board member serves a constituency, the entire district votes on every zone. Both the chairperson and the vice chairperson are nominated and elected by the Board.

The following are the current school board members:

School District Zone	Board Member Name
Zone 1	Lisa Harnisch
Zone 2	Cynthia Richardson
Zone 3	Jennifer Parker
Zone 4	Satya Chandragiri
Zone 5	Karina Guzmán Ortiz
Zone 6	Krissy Hudson
Zone 7	Mel Fuller

By 2021 the composition of the school board changed due to an influx of younger members from other ethnic backgrounds.

== Demographics ==
In the 2009 school year, the district had 815 students classified as homeless by the Department of Education, or 2.0% of students in the district.

== Schools ==
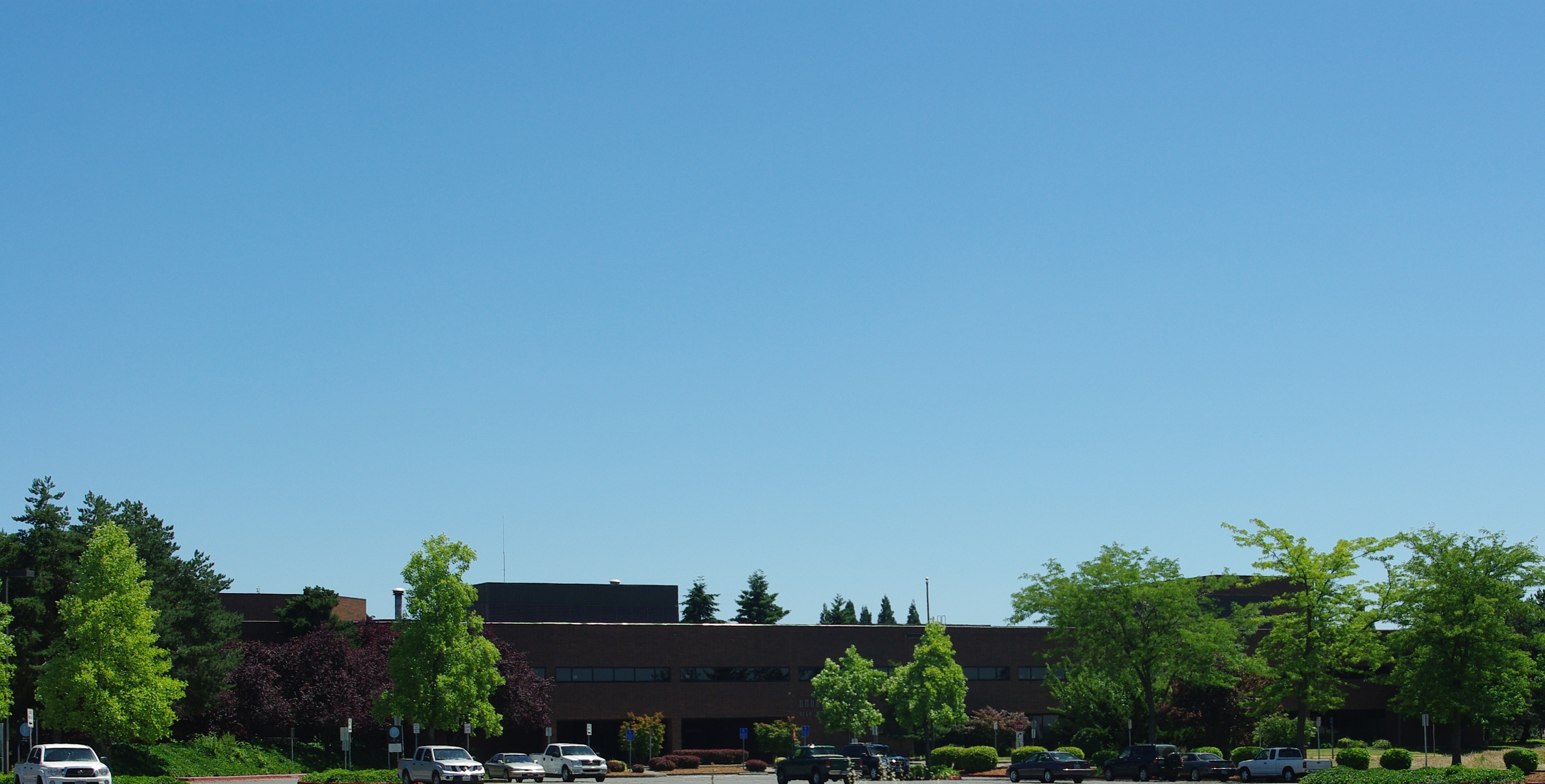
McKay High School

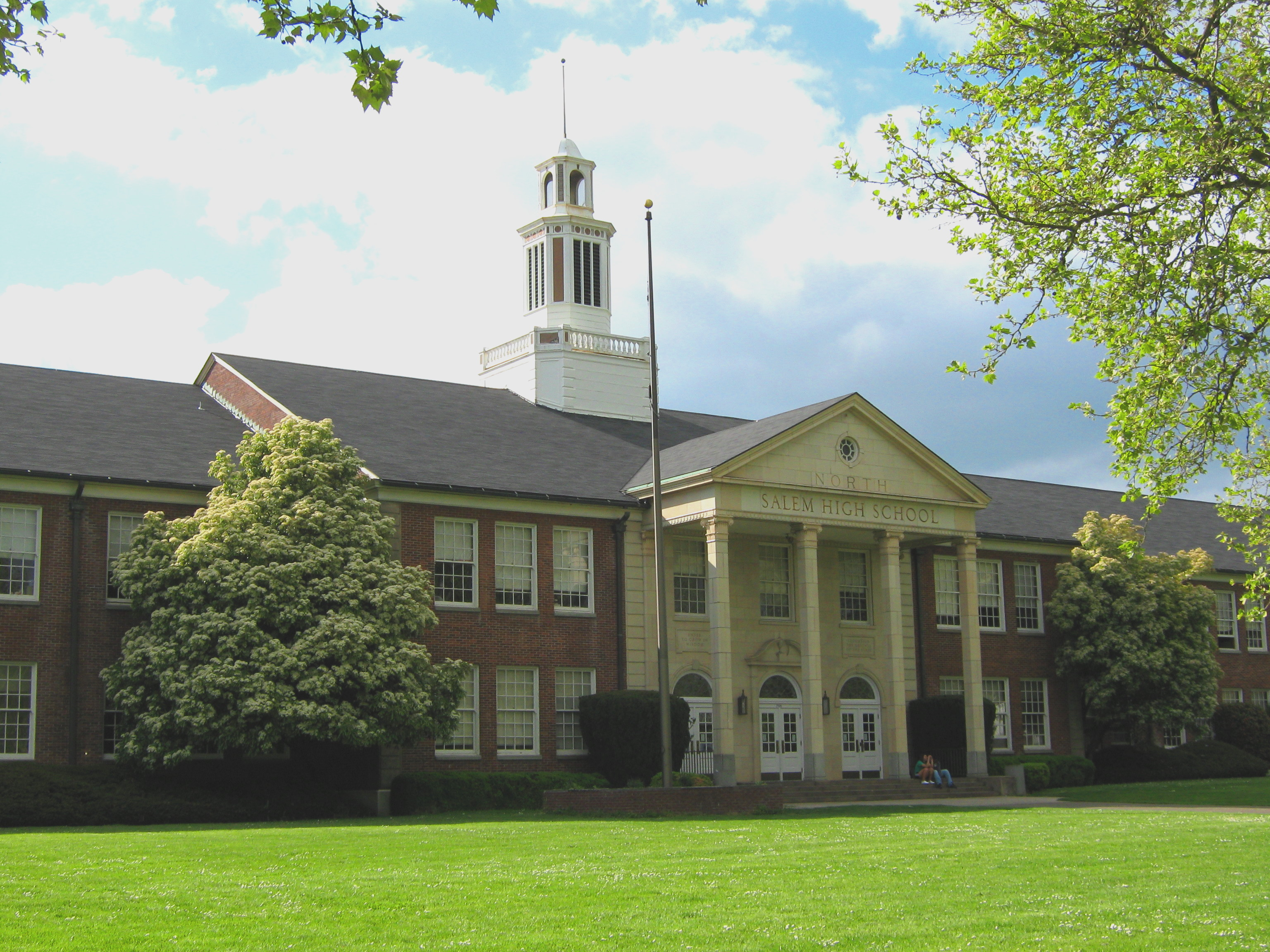
North Salem High School

=== High schools ===
- McKay High School
- McNary High School
- North Salem High School
- South Salem High School
- Sprague High School
- West Salem High School

There are also several alternative secondary school programs known collectively as Roberts High School, which includes SK Online.

Operating within the district there is a program available to junior and senior students known as CTEC (Career Technical Education Center) that aligns with high school graduation requirements as well as industry certifications and standards.

=== Middle schools ===
- Claggett Creek Middle School
- Crossler Middle School
- Houck Middle School
- Judson Middle School
- Leslie Middle School

Leslie was named for Reverend David Leslie, one of the founders of Salem and of Willamette University. The school opened on September 19, 1927. At its original location on Howard Street, it served 401 students the first year. Over the years it added a swimming pool, gymnasium, and cafeteria. At its peak enrollment in 1956, Leslie Middle School had an enrollment of 1,530 students.
Leslie's elementary feeder system consists of Bush, Richmond, McKinley, Morningside, and Candalaria elementary schools. All of Leslie's students move into South Salem High School upon graduation.
Originally located at 710 Howard St SE, Leslie Middle School moved to its current location at 3850 Pringle Road SE in 1997. The old location, which abuts South Salem High School, was once used as the high school annex and is now used by Howard Street Charter School.

- Parrish Middle School
- Stephens Middle School
- Straub Middle School

Straub, in West Salem, opened in 2011 and is named after Oregon Governor Bob Straub.

- Waldo Middle School
- Walker Middle School

Walker was the only middle school in West Salem until Straub Middle School opened in 2011. Walker serves students in grades 6–8. Average enrollment is 1,100 students. The school was established as Walker Junior High in 1962, and was named for Major Walter M. Walker. Actor Jon Heder attended Walker.

- Whiteaker Middle School

=== Charter schools ===
- Valley Inquiry Charter School
- Early College High School
- Roberts Middle School at Riverfront
- Roberts High School at CCC
- Howard Street Charter School
- Jane Goodall Environmental Middle School
- Optimum Learning Environment Charter School

=== Elementary schools ===
- Auburn Elementary School
- Battle Creek Elementary School
- Brush College Elementary School
- Bush Elementary School
  - Named after newspaper publisher and banker Asahel Bush, the school opened in 1936 as a consolidation of Lincoln, Yew Park, and other elementary schools. The 14 classroom, $192,531.83 building was the first school in Salem with an intercom. It had two 1930s murals from a program of the Works Progress Administration. The peak enrollment was in the 1952–1953 school year, 498 students. By the 1984–1985 school year the enrollment declined to 226, prompting the school district to discuss with Salem Hospital, the idea of selling the school. In 1986 the Council of Teachers of English named Bush a "national center of excellence". The Brandon Johnson Memorial Playground, named after a student who died in 1989, was the first Oregon playground customized for children who use wheelchairs; it opened in 1990. A new 12 classroom, $6.2 million campus began construction in late 2004, financed by the hospital, which agreed to purchase the original school. The previous school was demolished in 2005 after the murals were removed, and a parking lot serving the hospital was put in its place. The new school campus opened that year. The murals are now located at North Salem High School.
- Candalaria Elementary School
- Chapman Hill Elementary School
- Chávez Elementary School
- Clear Lake Elementary School
- Cummings Elementary School
- Englewood Elementary School
- Eyre Elementary School
- Forest Ridge Elementary School
- Four Corners Elementary School
- Grant Community School
- Gubser Elementary School
- Hallman Elementary School
- Hammond Elementary School
- Harritt Elementary School
- Hayesville Elementary School
- Highland Elementary School
- Hoover Elementary School
- Kalapuya Elementary School
- Keizer Elementary School
- Kennedy Elementary School
- Lamb Elementary School
- Lee Elementary School
- Liberty Elementary School
- McKinley Elementary School
- Miller Elementary School
- Morningside Elementary School
- Myers Elementary School
- Pringle Elementary School
- Richmond Elementary School
- Salem Heights Elementary School
- Schirle Elementary School
- Scott Elementary School
- Sumpter Elementary School
- Swegle Elementary School
- Washington Elementary School
- Weddle Elementary School
- Wright Elementary School
- Yoshikai Elementary School

== Former schools ==
The district closed several small rural schools in the 2010s, including Rosedale and Hazel Green.

Other former schools include:

- Bethel Elementary School, named after the Bethel Church, built in that locale by the Dunkards; now used for a Head Start program and the central Head Start office.
- Fruitland Elementary School, now the district preschool office and Head Start
- Garfield Elementary School, now the Old Garfield School office building
- Hazel Green Elementary School, now Valley Inquiry Charter School
- Lake Labish Elementary School
- Middle Grove Elementary School
- Rosedale Elementary School, now used by the independent private Abiqua Academy
