= Early College High School (Salem, Oregon) =

Location
- 4071 Winema Place, Building 50; Salem, (Marion County), Oregon 97305; United States
- Coordinates: 44.973988°N 122.981194°W

Information
- Type: Public
- School district: Salem-Keizer School District
- Principal: Brad Shreve
- Teaching staff: 15.56 (FTE)
- Grades: 9–12
- Enrollment: 202 (2017–18)
- Student to teacher ratio: 12.98
- Website: "Early College High School".
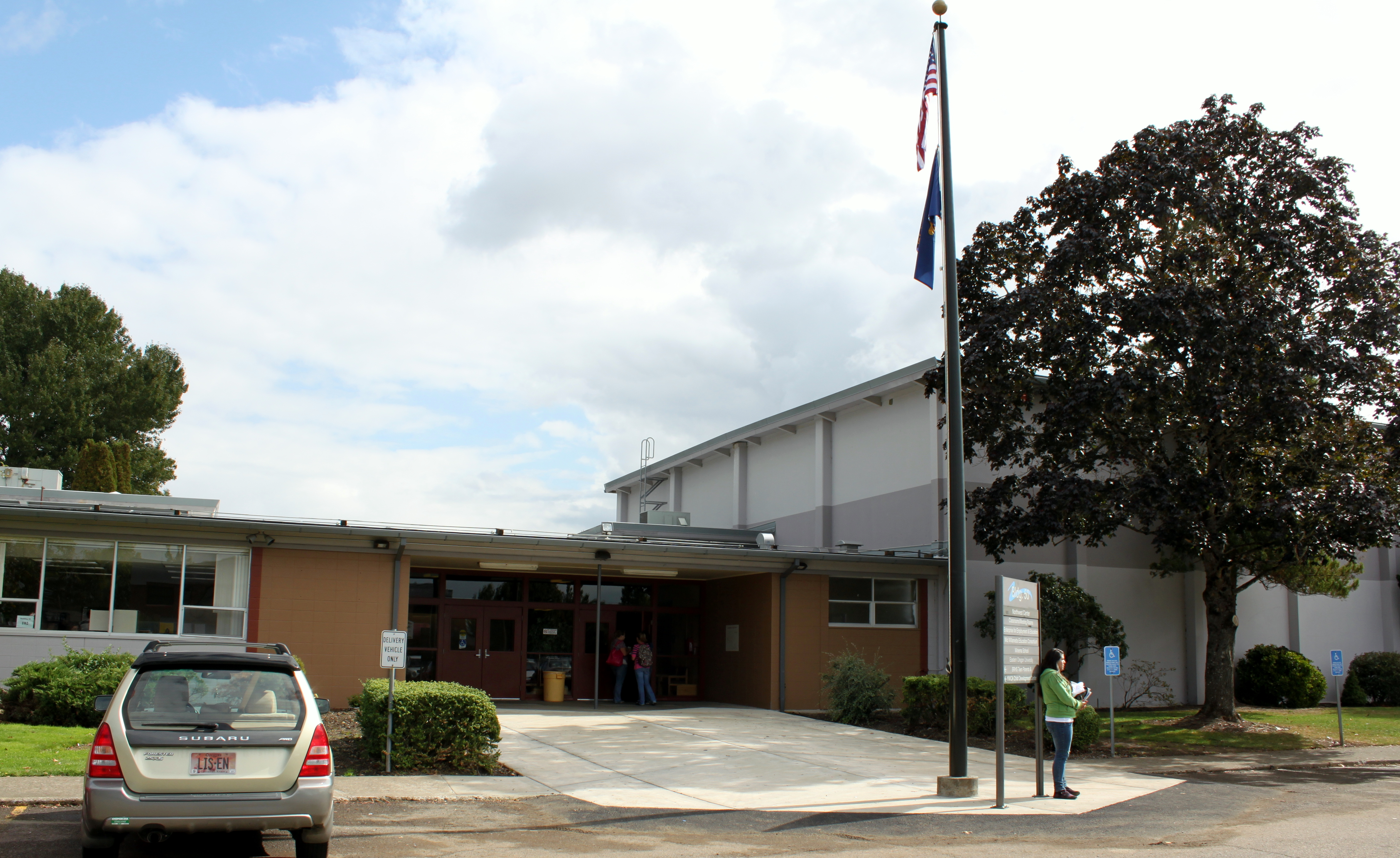

Early College High School is a high school in Salem, Oregon, United States that allows high school students to pursue college education early, similar to dual enrollment programs. When the students begin their junior year, they enter a phase when they are allowed to take part-time college classes. By the time the student is in their senior year, they are expected to be a full-time college student. Early College High School is located on the campus of Chemeketa Community College, building 50.

== Academics ==
For the 2022-23 school year, Early College had 100% on time graduation, with 88% college going, which is significantly higher than the 56% Oregon average. The average class size is 11 students.
