= Walter M. Walker =

American politician

Major Walter Montgomery Walker (July 23, 1814 - May 4, 1896) was an American pioneer of the U.S. state of Oregon. He had risen to the rank of major during the Indian Wars, and crossed the plains in 1848 with a train of 55 wagons. He settled in the area now known as Polk County, Oregon, on the west bank of the Willamette River, not far from the current location of Walker Middle School in what is now West Salem. He had brought a large supply of nursery stock with him, and quickly set about planting orchards. He found that the soil of the area was well adapted to fruit, and consequently, fruit orchards remain an important industry in the area.

The main products of his orchards were prunes and cherries (Salem is still known as the "cherry city") but he also grew apples, strawberries, gooseberries, grapes, pears, holly and hops.

Walker was the first Polk County Commissioner (1848) and was later elected to the Oregon Territorial Legislature in 1856.

Walker Middle School in the Salem-Keizer School District was named for him.
