= Tchimpounga Sanctuary =

Primate wildlife refuge

Coordinates: 4.53832°S 11.85067°E

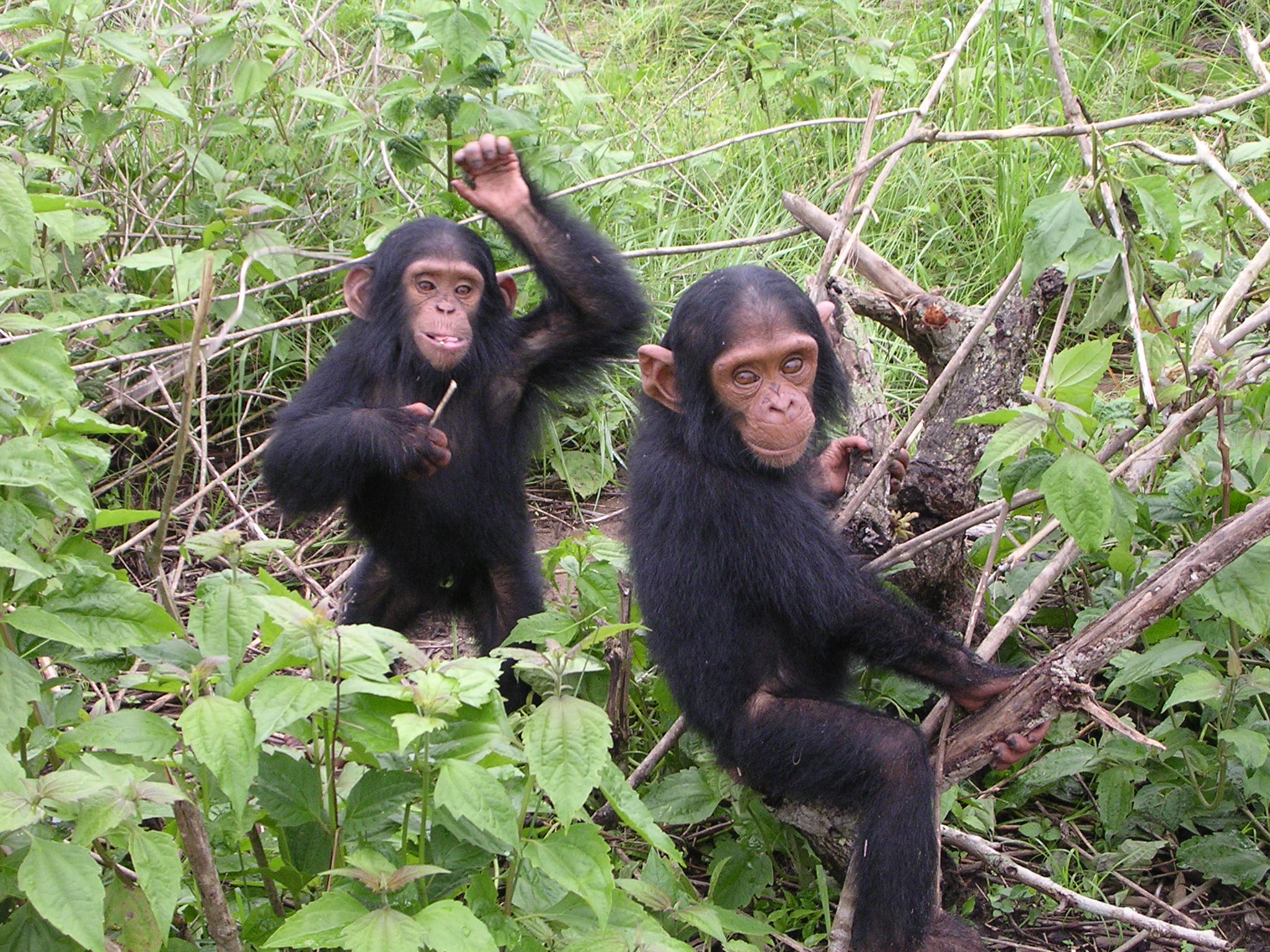
- Young chimpanzees at Jane Goodall sanctuary in Tchimpounga (2006)
- Interactive map of Tchimpounga Sanctuary

The Tchimpounga Sanctuary, also known as the Tchimpounga Chimpanzee Rehabilitation Center, for primates is located on a coastal plain of savanna and forest in the Republic of the Congo, and was built in 1992. The site covers an area of 70 square kilometres (27 sq mi). The sanctuary, part of the Jane Goodall Institute, is located 50 km (31 miles) north of Pointe-Noire in the Kouilou Department and is the largest chimpanzee sanctuary on the African continent. It has conducted research comparing food-sharing and social inhibition among chimpanzees and bonobos.

The sanctuary is a refuge west of the Congo Basin for chimpanzees orphaned by bushmeat hunters; authorities deliver the young animals after confiscating them from sellers in the pet or entertainment trades.

The sanctuary is a member of the Pan African Sanctuary Alliance.
