= Retretti =

Art museum in Punkaharju, Finland

Coordinates: 61°48′12″N 029°17′24″E

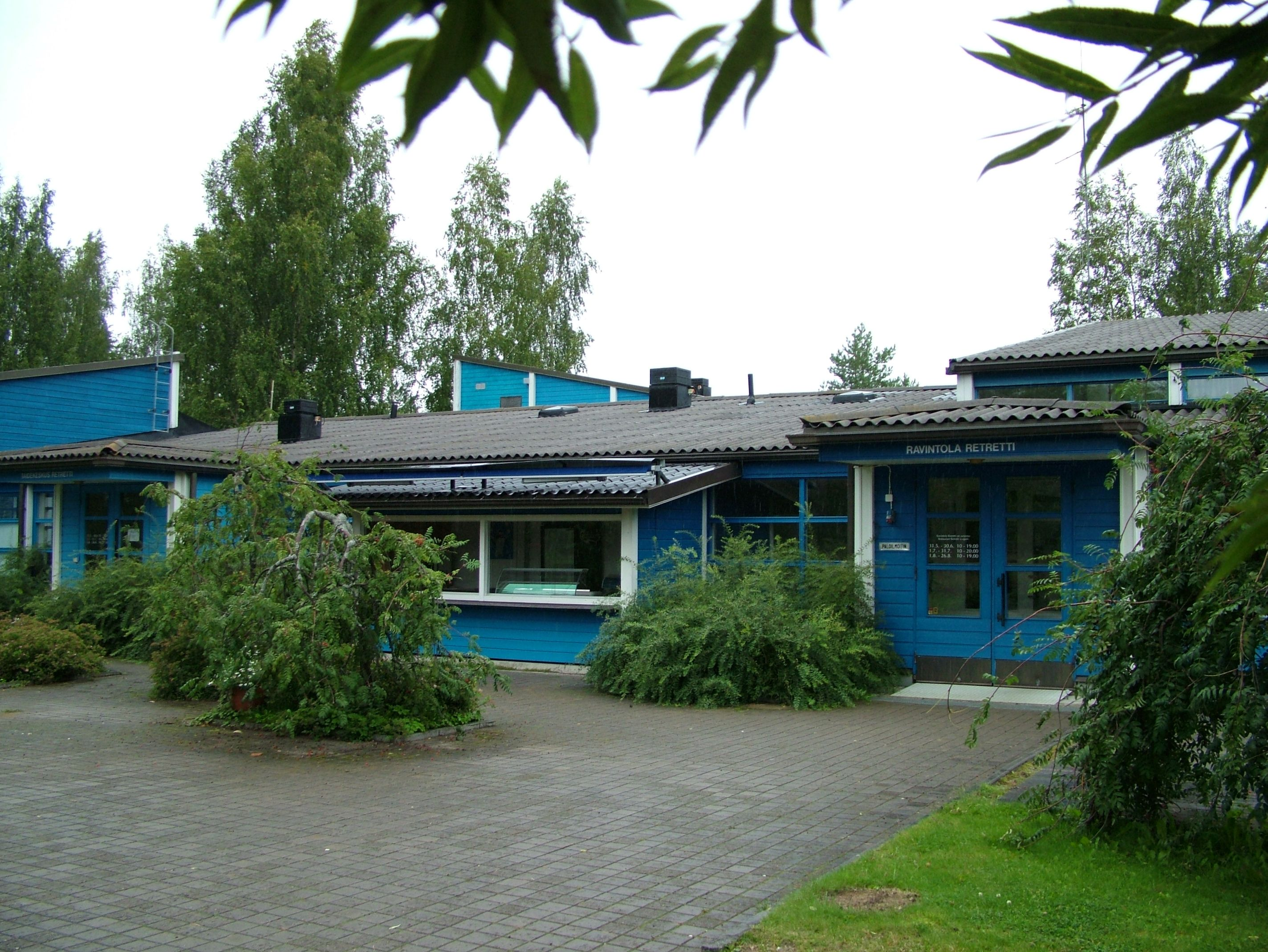
The entrance to Retretti.

Retretti was a major art museum in Punkaharju, Finland. It was unique in that most of its exhibition space was underground. The man-made caves total 3,700 square metres (40,000 sq ft) and reach a depth of 30 metres (98 ft).

There was a souvenir shop and a restaurant in the premises.

Retretti Oy went into bankruptcy in autumn 2012. A new company now operates an art venture in Savonlinna city centre under the name Retretti, but reopening the underground exhibition spaces was not a priority in 2013.
