= Neptune Wellness =

Organization

Neptune Wellness Solutions, Inc.
- Traded as: Formerly Nasdaq: NEPT; Formerly TSX: NEPT; OTC Pink: NEPTF
- Industry: Packaged Goods
- Headquarters: Laval, Quebec, Canada
- Key people: Michael De Geus (CEO); Cedrick Billequey (COO)
- Products: Krill oil
- Website: neptunecorp.com at the Wayback Machine (archived January 22, 2021)

Neptune Wellness Solutions is a Canadian biotech company that produced krill oil and other supplements and was based in Laval, Quebec. It had also provided hemp oil and cannabis products until it sold that part of the business in 2022.

Originally known for Antarctic krill oil production, the company previously operated an industrial-scale licensed cannabis processing plant in Quebec, CA, and a hemp processing facility in North Carolina in the U.S. until selling the cannabis business in 2022.

== History ==
Neptune Wellness Solutions (originally Neptune Technologies and Bioresources) was founded by Henri Harland and Luc Rainville in 1998.

The Canadian company conducted some of the first research on the health benefits of krill oil and the unique, absorption capacity of its “phospholipid” molecular structure and the fats contained within it. Neptune secured a family of patents - for an extraction process as well as composition and method of use.

In 2002, the company pioneered the production and extraction of Antarctic krill oil. In 2003, after constructing a new facility in Sherbrooke, Quebec, Neptune launched its first product, Neptune Krill Oil, creating a new omega-3 category, manufactured using acetone as a solvent.

In 2012, an explosion in Neptune's processing plant resulted in three deaths and halted production at the facility. Following the accident, the company spent two years rebuilding the plant and was required to meet several safety conditions before resuming production in 2014.

In 2017, Neptune essentially exited the bulk krill oil manufacturing and distribution business, selling its client list to its main competitor, Aker BioMarine of Oslo, Norway, for $34 million. The company invested to convert its Sherbrooke facility to process cannabis biomass using new cold-ethanol technology and rebranded to Neptune Wellness Solutions.

In 2021 Neptune announced the acquisition of a controlling interest in Sprout Foods.

Neptune was licensed by Health Canada in January 2019 to enter the cannabis market, allowing the company to manufacture and purify cannabis extracts and oil. After receiving the license, the company entered into a three-year contract with Canadian companies The Green Organic Dutchman and Tilray, securing cannabis and hemp biomass for extraction of crude resin, winterized oil, and distillate extracts for their products. In May 2019, Neptune entered the U.S. hemp market by acquiring the assets of SugarLeaf Labs and Forest Remedies. The purchase included a 24,000-square-foot cold-ethanol hemp processing facility, located in Conover, NC.

In 2024, the company was delisted from the Nasdaq after steep declines in its share price due to financial difficulties. John M. Moretz who served as Chairman, also settled a case brought by the US Securities and Exchange Commission in May 2024 and agreed to pay a penalty of $115,000.

== Products ==
=== Krill Oil ===
Made from Antarctic krill, a sustainable and non-genetically modified source of omega-3 fatty acids, Neptune's krill-based supplements are available to consumers in the U.S. and Canada for direct purchase or through its distributors.

=== Hemp Oil ===
Neptune had produced hemp-derived products exclusively from U.S.-grown hemp. The company was involved in all aspects of product production, including farmer collaboration during the growth cycle to processing, formulating, testing, packaging, and distributing finished products to customers. Its products include ingestibles and topical products and are safe for both humans and pets. It sold this part of the business in 2022.
