= Jane Goodall =

English primatologist (1934–2025)

Dame Jane Goodall DBE
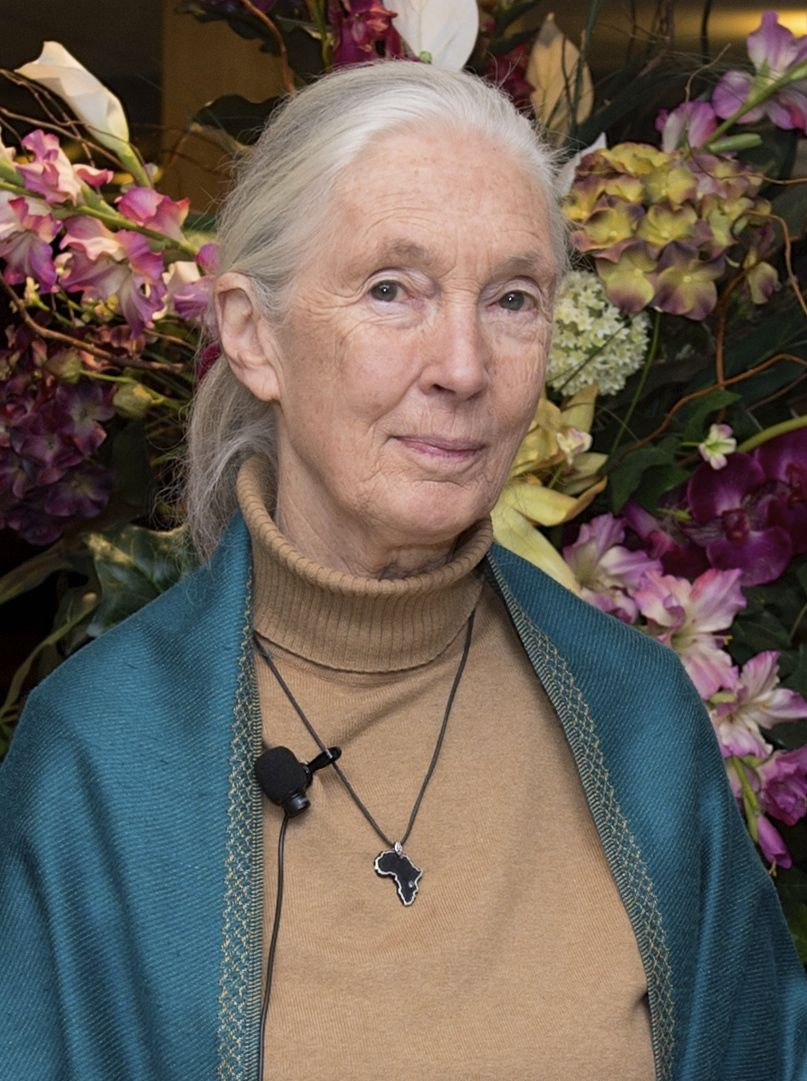
- Goodall in 2015
- Born: Valerie Jane Morris-Goodall; 3 April 1934; London, England
- Died: 1 October 2025 (aged 91); Beverly Hills, California, US
- Education: Newnham College, Cambridge (PhD)
- Known for: Study of chimpanzees; conservation; animal welfare
- Spouses: Hugo van Lawick (m. 1964; div. 1974) Derek Bryceson (m. 1975; died 1980)
- Children: 1
- Awards: Kyoto Prize (1990); Hubbard Medal (1995); Tyler Prize for Environmental Achievement (1997); Dame Commander of the Order of the British Empire (2004); Templeton Prize (2021); Presidential Medal of Freedom (2025)
- Scientific career
- Fields: Ethology
- Thesis: Behaviour of Free-Living Chimpanzees (1966)
- Doctoral advisor: Robert Hinde
- Jane Goodall's voice From the BBC programme Woman's Hour; Recorded 26 January 2010

Dame Valerie Jane Morris-Goodall (/ˈɡʊdɔːl/ GUUD-awl; 3 April 1934 – 1 October 2025) was an English primatologist and anthropologist. Regarded as a pioneer in primate ethology, and described by many publications as "the world's preeminent chimpanzee expert", she was best known for more than six decades of field research on the social and family life of wild chimpanzees in the Kasakela chimpanzee community at Gombe Stream National Park in Tanzania. Beginning in 1960, under the mentorship of the palaeontologist Louis Leakey, Goodall's research demonstrated that chimpanzees share many key traits with humans, such as using tools, having complex emotions, forming lasting social bonds, engaging in organised warfare, and passing on knowledge across generations, which redefined the traditional view that humans are uniquely different from other animals.

In 1965 Goodall was awarded a PhD in ethology from the University of Cambridge. In the 1960s Goodall published several accounts of her research in Tanzania, including a series of articles in National Geographic. Her first book-length study, In the Shadow of Man (1971), was later translated into 48 languages. She founded the Jane Goodall Institute in 1977 to promote wildlife conservation, followed by the Roots & Shoots youth programme in 1991, which grew into a global network. Goodall also established wildlife sanctuaries and reforestation projects in Africa and campaigned for the ethical treatment of animals in animal testing, animal husbandry and captivity. Goodall was appointed a United Nations Messenger of Peace in 2002, and advised organisations such as Save the Chimps and the Society for the Protection of Underground Networks.

Throughout her career Goodall wrote 32 books, 15 of them for children, and was the subject of over 40 films. She remained an active lecturer, travelling extensively to promote conservation and climate action. Goodall was an honorary member of the World Future Council. Among other honours, she was a recipient of the National Geographic Society's Hubbard Medal, the Kyoto Prize, the Templeton Prize and the United States Presidential Medal of Freedom. In 2003 she was named a dame commander of the Order of the British Empire by Queen Elizabeth II. Goodall served on the board of the Nonhuman Rights Project from 2022 until her death.

== Early life and education ==
Valerie Jane Morris-Goodall was born in April 1934 in Hampstead, London, to Mortimer Herbert Morris-Goodall, a businessman, and Margaret Myfanwe Joseph, a novelist from Milford Haven, Pembrokeshire, who wrote under the pen name Vanne Morris-Goodall.

After the family moved to Bournemouth, Goodall attended Uplands School, an independent school in nearby Poole.

When she was a child, Goodall's father gave her a stuffed toy chimpanzee named Jubilee as an alternative to a teddy bear. Goodall had said her fondness for it sparked her early love of animals, commenting, "My mother's friends were horrified by this toy, thinking it would frighten me and give me nightmares." Jubilee was still on Goodall's dresser in London as of 2000.

=== Africa ===
Goodall had always been drawn to animals and Africa, which brought her to the farm of a friend in the White Highlands in the Colony and Protectorate of Kenya in 1957. From there, she obtained work as a secretary, and acting on her friend's advice, she telephoned Louis Leakey, the Kenyan archaeologist and palaeontologist, with no other thought than to make an appointment to discuss animals. Leakey, believing that the study of existing great apes could provide indications of the behaviour of early hominids, was looking for a chimpanzee researcher, though he kept the idea to himself. Instead, he proposed that Goodall work for him as a secretary. After obtaining approval from his co-researcher and wife, the palaeoanthropologist Mary Leakey, Louis sent Goodall to Olduvai Gorge in Tanganyika (later part of Tanzania), where he laid out his plans.

=== Education ===
In 1958 Leakey sent Goodall to London to study primate behaviour with Osman Hill and primate anatomy with John Napier. Leakey raised funds, and on 14 July 1960 Goodall went to Gombe Stream National Park, becoming the first of what would come to be called the Trimates. She was accompanied by her mother, whose presence was necessary to satisfy the requirements of David Anstey, chief warden, who was concerned for their safety. Goodall credits her mother with encouraging her to pursue a career in primatology, a male-dominated field at the time. Goodall said that women were not accepted in the field when she started her research in the late 1950s. As of 2019 the field of primatology is made up almost evenly of men and women, in part thanks to the trailblazing work of Goodall and her encouragement of young women to join the field.

Louis Leakey arranged funding, and in 1962 he sent Goodall, who had no degree, to the University of Cambridge. She was the eighth person to be allowed to study for a PhD at Cambridge without first having obtained a bachelor's degree. She attended Newnham College, Cambridge, to pursue a Doctor of Philosophy degree in ethology. Her thesis was completed in 1966 under the supervision of Robert Hinde on the Behaviour of free-living chimpanzees, detailing her first five years of study at the Gombe Reserve.

On 19 June 2006 the Open University of Tanzania awarded her an honorary Doctor of Science degree. She became an honorary fellow of both Newnham College (her alma mater) and Darwin College, Cambridge, in 2019, when she was also awarded an honorary doctorate.

== Career ==
=== Research at Gombe Stream National Park ===
Goodall in conversation with Silver Donald Cameron, discussing her work

Goodall studied chimpanzee social and family life beginning with the Kasakela chimpanzee community in Gombe Stream National Park, Tanzania, in 1960. She found that "it isn't only human beings who have personality, who are capable of rational thought [and] emotions like joy and sorrow." She also observed behaviours often considered human, such as hugs, kisses, pats on the back, and even tickling. Goodall insisted that these gestures are evidence of "the close, supportive, affectionate bonds that develop between family members and other individuals within a community, which can persist throughout a life span of more than 50 years."

Goodall's research at Gombe Stream challenged two long-standing beliefs of the day: that only humans could construct and use tools, and that chimpanzees were vegetarians. While observing one chimpanzee feeding at a termite mound, she watched him repeatedly place stalks of grass into termite holes, then remove them from the hole covered with clinging termites, effectively "fishing" for termites. The chimpanzees would also take twigs from trees and strip off the leaves to make the twig more effective, a form of object modification that is the rudimentary beginnings of toolmaking. Humans had long distinguished themselves from the rest of the animal kingdom as "Man the Toolmaker". In response to Goodall's revolutionary findings, Louis Leakey wrote, "[w]e must now redefine man, redefine tool, or accept chimpanzees as human!"

Goodall observed the tendency for aggression and violence within chimpanzee troops. Goodall observed dominant females deliberately killing the young of other females in the troop to maintain their dominance, sometimes going as far as cannibalism. She said of this revelation,

During the first ten years of the study I had believed [...] that the Gombe chimpanzees were, for the most part, rather nicer than human beings. [...] Then suddenly we found that chimpanzees could be brutal—that they, like us, had a darker side to their nature.

She described the 1974–1978 Gombe Chimpanzee War in her 1990 memoir, Through a Window: My Thirty Years with the Chimpanzees of Gombe. Her findings revolutionised contemporary knowledge of chimpanzee behaviour and were further evidence of the social similarities between humans and chimpanzees.

Goodall found an aggressive side of chimpanzee nature at Gombe Stream. She discovered that chimpanzees will systematically hunt and eat smaller primates such as colobus monkeys. Goodall watched a hunting group isolate a colobus monkey high in a tree and block all possible exits; then one chimpanzee climbed up and captured and killed the colobus. The others then each took parts of the carcass, sharing with other members of the troop in response to begging behaviours. The chimpanzees at Gombe kill and eat as much as one-third of the colobus population in the park each year. This represented a major scientific discovery that challenged previous conceptions of chimpanzee diet and behaviour.

Goodall set herself apart from convention by naming the animals in her studies of primates instead of assigning each a number. Numbering was a nearly universal practice at the time and was thought to be important in avoiding emotional attachment to the subject being studied and thus losing objectivity. Goodall wrote in 1993,

When, in the early 1960s, I brazenly used such words as 'childhood', 'adolescence', 'motivation', 'excitement', and 'mood' I was much criticised. Even worse was my crime of suggesting that chimpanzees had 'personalities'. I was ascribing human characteristics to nonhuman animals and was thus guilty of that worst of ethological sins—anthropomorphism.

Setting herself apart from other researchers also led her to develop a close bond with the chimpanzees and to become the only human ever accepted into chimpanzee society.

Among those whom Goodall named during her years in Gombe were:

- David Greybeard, a grey-chinned male who first warmed up to Goodall;
- Goliath, a friend of David Greybeard, originally the alpha male named for his bold nature;
- Mike, who through his cunning and improvisation displaced Goliath as the alpha male;
- Humphrey, a big, strong, bullysome male;
- Gigi, a large, sterile female who delighted in being the "aunt" of any young chimps or humans;
- Mr. McGregor, a belligerent older male;
- Flo, a motherly, high-ranking female with a bulbous nose and ragged ears, and her children; Figan, Faben, Freud, Fifi, and Flint;
- Frodo, Fifi's second-oldest child, an aggressive male who also attacked humans, including Goodall.

=== Jane Goodall Institute ===
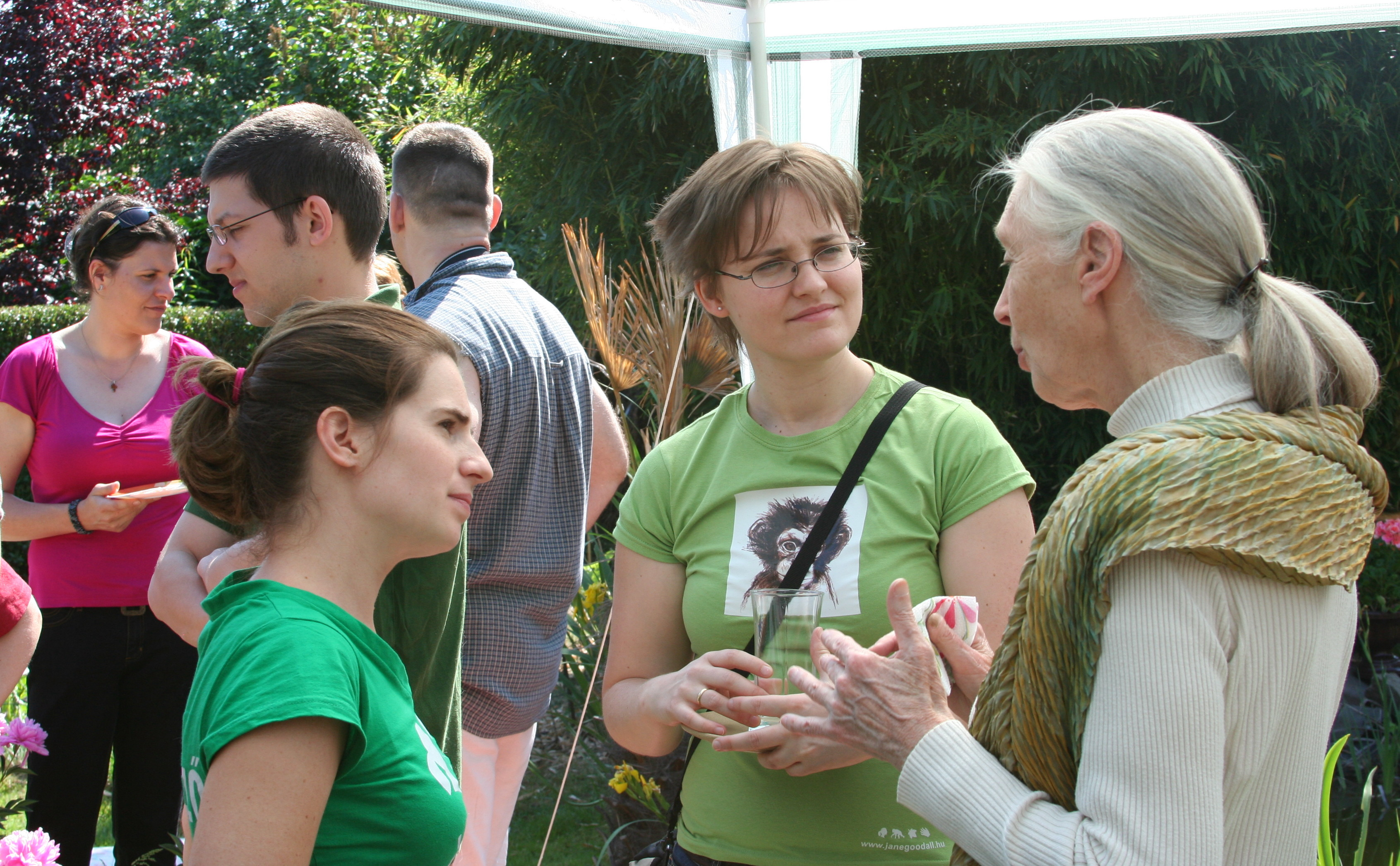
Goodall in 2009 with Hungarian Roots & Shoots group members

In 1977 Goodall established the Jane Goodall Institute (JGI), which supports the Gombe research, and she was a global leader in the effort to protect chimpanzees and their habitats. With nineteen offices around the world, the JGI is widely recognised for community-centred conservation and development programmes in Africa. Its global youth programme, Roots & Shoots, began in 1991 when a group of 12 local teenagers met with Goodall on her back porch in Dar es Salaam, Tanzania. They were eager to discuss a range of problems they knew about from first-hand experience that caused them deep concern. The organisation has over 10,000 groups in over 100 countries as of 2010.

In 1992 Goodall founded the Tchimpounga Chimpanzee Rehabilitation Centre in the Republic of Congo to care for chimpanzees orphaned due to bush-meat trade. The rehabilitation houses over a hundred chimps over its three islands.

In 1994 Goodall founded the Lake Tanganyika Catchment Reforestation and Education (TACARE or "Take Care") pilot project to protect chimpanzees' habitat from deforestation by reforesting hills around Gombe while simultaneously educating neighbouring communities on sustainability and agriculture training. The TACARE project also supports young girls by offering them access to reproductive health education and through scholarships to finance their college tuition.

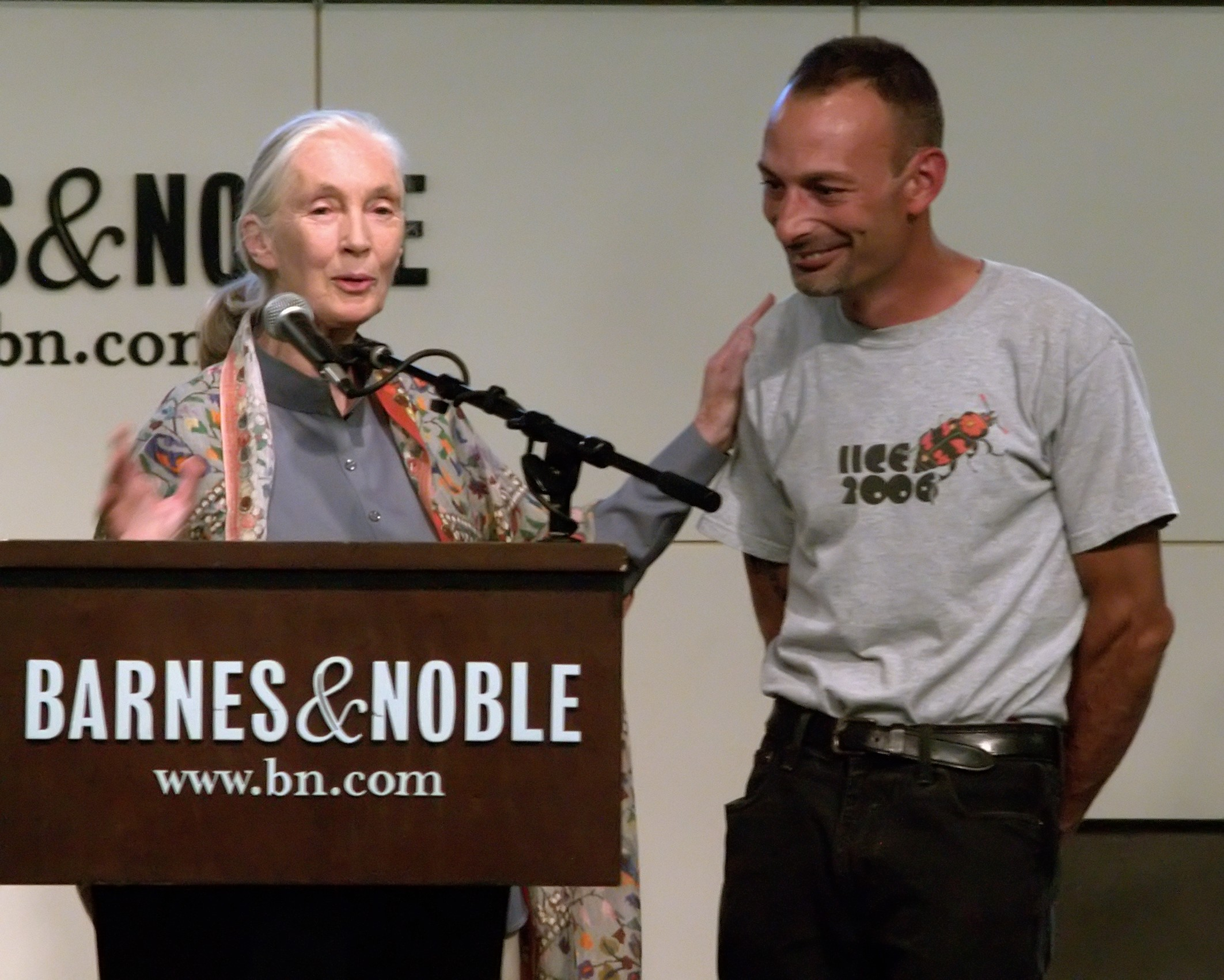
Goodall in 2009 with Lou Perrotti, who contributed to her book Hope for Animals and Their World

Owing to an overflow of handwritten notes, photographs, and data piling up at Goodall's home in Dar es Salaam in the mid-1990s, the Jane Goodall Institute's Center for Primate Studies was created at the University of Minnesota to house and organise this data. As of 2011, all of the original Jane Goodall archives reside there and have been digitised, analysed, and placed in an online database. On 17 March 2011 Karl Bates, a Duke University spokesman, announced that the archives would be moved to Duke, with Anne E. Pusey, Duke's chairman of evolutionary anthropology, overseeing the collection. Pusey, who managed the archives in Minnesota and worked with Goodall in Tanzania, had worked at Duke for a year.

In 2018 and 2020 Goodall partnered with her friend Michael Cammarata on two natural product lines from Schmidt's Naturals and Neptune Wellness Solutions. Five percent of every sale benefited the Jane Goodall Institute.

As of 2004 Goodall devoted virtually all of her time to advocacy on behalf of chimpanzees and the environment, travelling nearly 300 days a year. Goodall was also on the advisory council for the world's largest chimpanzee sanctuary outside of Africa, Save the Chimps in Fort Pierce, Florida, United States.

Goodall was an advisory board member for The Society for the Protection of Underground Networks (SPUN).

=== Activism ===
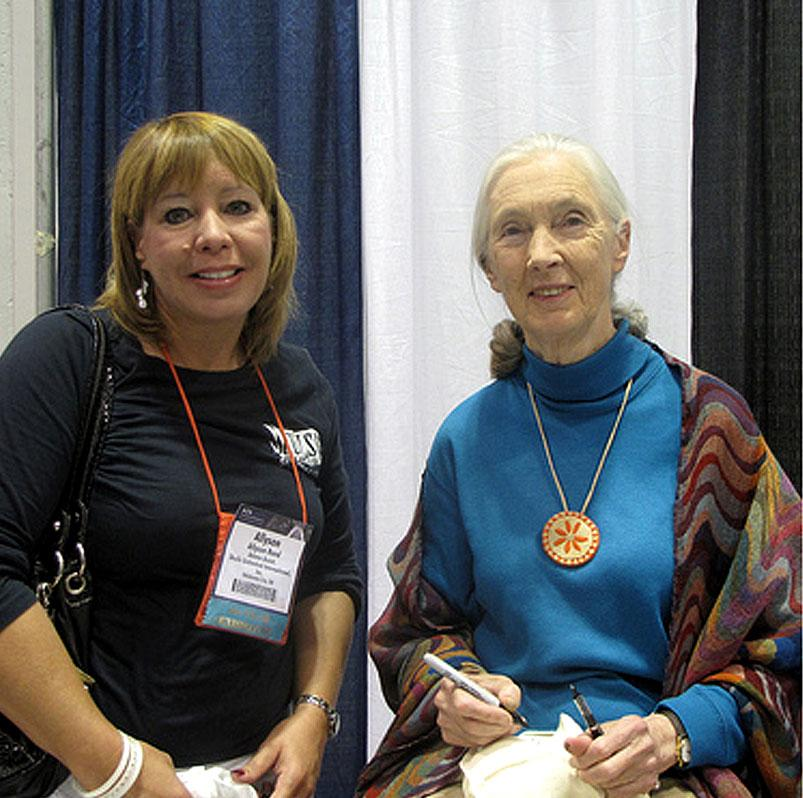
Goodall with Allyson Reed of Skulls Unlimited International, at the Association of Zoos and Aquariums annual conference in September 2009

Goodall credited the 1986 Understanding Chimpanzees conference, hosted by the Chicago Academy of Sciences, with shifting her focus from observation of chimpanzees to a broader and more intense concern with animal-human conservation. She was the former president of Advocates for Animals, an organisation based in Edinburgh, Scotland, that campaigns against the use of animals in medical research, zoos, farming and sport.

She was a vegetarian and advocated the diet for ethical, environmental, and health reasons. In The Inner World of Farm Animals (2009), Goodall wrote that farm animals are "far more aware and intelligent than we ever imagined and, despite having been bred as domestic slaves, they are individual beings in their own right. As such, they deserve our respect. And our help. Who will plead for them if we are silent?" Goodall also said: "Thousands of people who say they 'love' animals sit down once or twice a day to enjoy the flesh of creatures who have been treated with so little respect and kindness just to make more meat." In 2021 Goodall became a vegan and authored a cookbook titled Eat Meat Less.

Goodall was an outspoken environmental advocate, speaking on the effects of climate change on endangered species such as chimpanzees. Goodall, alongside her foundation, collaborated with the US National Aeronautics and Space Administration to use satellite imagery from the Landsat series to remedy the effects of deforestation on chimpanzees and local communities in Western Africa by offering the villagers information on how to reduce activity and preserve their environment. To ensure the safe and ethical treatment of animals during ethological studies, Goodall, alongside Professor Mark Bekoff, founded the organisation Ethologists for the Ethical Treatment of Animals in 2000.

In 2008 Goodall gave a lecture entitled "Reason for Hope" at the University of San Diego's Joan B. Kroc Institute for Peace & Justice, and in the same year demanded the European Union end the use of medical research on animals and ensure more funding for alternative methods of medical research. She described Edinburgh Zoo's new primate enclosure as a "wonderful facility" where monkeys "are probably better off [than those] living in the wild in an area like Budongo, where one in six gets caught in a wire snare, and countries like Congo, where chimpanzees, monkeys and gorillas are shot for food commercially." This was in conflict with Advocates for Animals' position on captive animals. In June that year, she resigned the presidency of the organisation which she had held since 1998, citing her busy schedule and explaining, "I just don't have time for them." Goodall was a patron of the population concern charity Population Matters and as of 2017 was an ambassador for Disneynature.

In 2010 Goodall, through the Jane Goodall Institute, formed a coalition with a number of organisations such as the Wildlife Conservation Society (WCS) and the Humane Society of the United States (HSUS) and petitioned to list all chimpanzees, including those that are captive, as endangered. In 2015 the United States Fish and Wildlife Service accepted this rule and classified all chimpanzees as endangered. In 2011 she became a patron of the Australian animal protection group Voiceless. "I have for decades been concerned about factory farming, in part because of the tremendous harm inflicted on the environment, but also because of the shocking ongoing cruelty perpetuated on millions of sentient beings."

In 2012 she took on the role of challenger for the Engage in Conservation Challenge with The DO School, formerly known as the D&F Academy. She worked with a group of aspiring social entrepreneurs to create a workshop to engage young people in conserving biodiversity, and to tackle a perceived global lack of awareness of the issue. In 2014 Goodall wrote to Air France executives, criticising the airline's continued transport of monkeys to laboratories. Goodall called the practise "cruel" and "traumatic" for the monkeys involved. The same year, Goodall also wrote to the US National Institutes of Health (NIH) to criticise maternal deprivation experiments on baby monkeys in NIH laboratories.

Prior to the 2015 UK general election, she endorsed the parliamentary candidacy of the Green Party's Caroline Lucas. She was a critic of fox hunting and signed a letter to Members of Parliament in 2015 opposing the Conservative prime minister David Cameron's plan to amend the Hunting Act 2004.

In August 2019 Goodall was honoured for her contributions to science with a bronze sculpture in Midtown Manhattan alongside nine other women, part of the Statues for Equality project. In 2020 she advocated for ecocide (mass damage or destruction of nature) to be made an international crime, stating "The concept of Ecocide is long overdue. It could lead to an important change in the way people perceive – and respond to – the current environmental crisis." That same year, Goodall vowed to plant five million trees, part of the one trillion tree initiative founded by the World Economic Forum.

In 2021 Goodall called on the European Commission to abolish caging of farm animals.

In 2021 Goodall joined the Rewriting Extinction campaign to fight the climate and biodiversity crisis through comics. She is listed as a contributor to the book The Most Important Comic Book on Earth: Stories to Save the World which was released on 28 October 2021 by DK.

=== Feeding stations ===
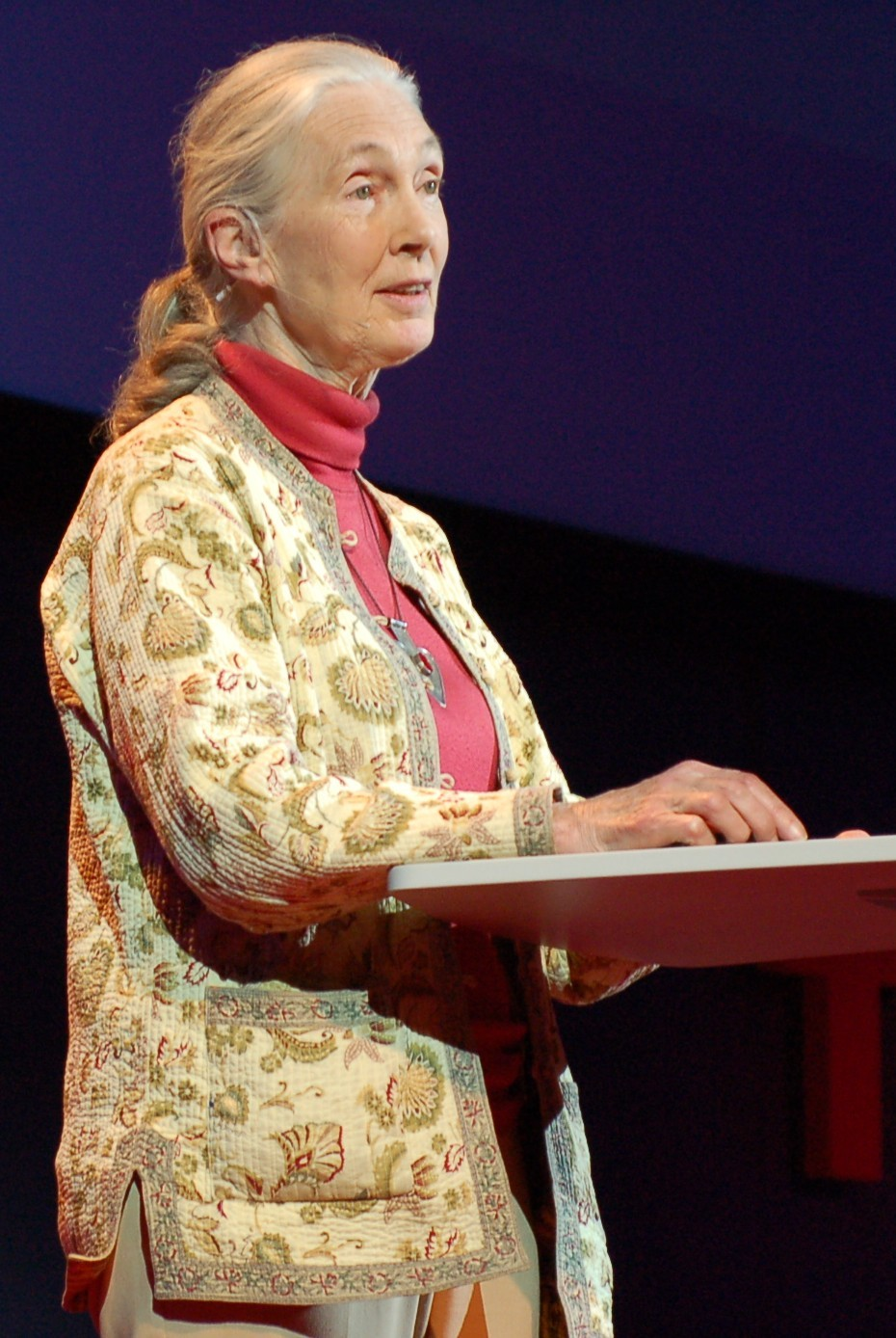
Goodall at TEDGlobal 2007

Many standard methods aim to avoid interference by observers, and in particular some believe that the use of feeding stations to attract Gombe chimpanzees has altered normal foraging and feeding patterns and social relationships. This argument is the focus of a book published by Margaret Power in 1991. It has been suggested that higher levels of aggression and conflict with other chimpanzee groups in the area were due to the feeding, which could have created the "wars" between chimpanzee social groups described by Goodall, aspects of which she did not witness in the years before artificial feeding began at Gombe. Thus, some regard Goodall's observations as distortions of normal chimpanzee behaviour.

Goodall herself acknowledged that feeding contributed to aggression within and between groups, but maintained that the effect was limited to alteration of the intensity and not the nature of chimpanzee conflict, and further suggested that feeding was necessary for the study to be effective at all. Craig Stanford of the Jane Goodall Research Center at the University of Southern California states that researchers conducting studies with no artificial provisioning have a difficult time viewing any social behaviour of chimpanzees, especially those related to inter-group conflict.

Some studies, such as those by Crickette Sanz in the Goualougo Triangle (Republic of the Congo) and Christophe Boesch in the Taï National Park (Ivory Coast), have not shown the aggression observed in the Gombe studies. However, other primatologists disagree that the studies are flawed; for example, Jim Moore provides a critique of Margaret Powers' assertions and some studies of other chimpanzee groups have shown aggression similar to that in Gombe even in the absence of feeding.

In an interview with The Hollywood Reporter in November 2017, Goodall was asked about the feeding stations and the controversy she received. Goodall acknowledged that she would not continue with feeding stations in present time as "there was absolutely no knowledge back then that chimpanzees could catch human infectious diseases".

== Death ==
Goodall died in her sleep of cardiac arrest while staying at the home of a friend in Beverly Hills, California, on 1 October 2025, at the age of 91. She had been on a speaking tour in the United States. Her death occurred 45 years to the day of her husband Bryceson's.

=== Tributes ===
Following her death, tributes were paid by prominent figures including Prince Harry, Duke of Sussex, and Meghan, Duchess of Sussex; the former US vice president Al Gore; the former Canadian prime minister Justin Trudeau, the comedian Ellen DeGeneres, the actor Leonardo DiCaprio; and António Guterres, Secretary-General of the United Nations.

In October 2025 Netflix released the first episode of Famous Last Words; in the episode, Goodall was interviewed by Brad Falchuk.

== Legacy ==
=== Awards and recognition ===
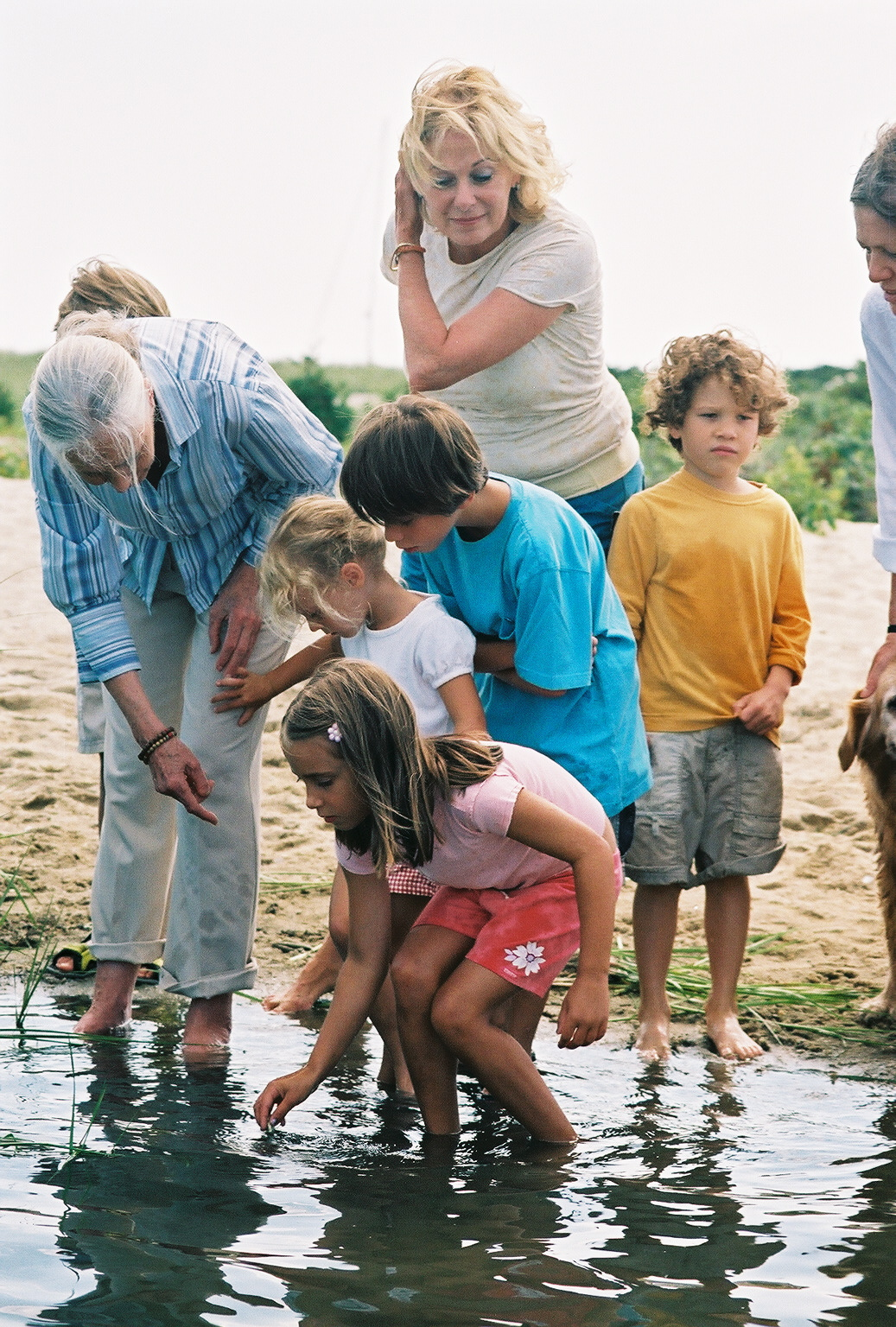
Goodall teaching about wetlands in Martha's Vineyard, US, 2006

Goodall received many honours for her environmental and humanitarian work, as well as others. In the 1995 New Year Honours, she was appointed a Commander of the Order of the British Empire (CBE) "for services to zoology", and in the 2003 Birthday Honours, promoted to Dame Commander of the same Order (DBE) "for services to the environment and conservation". The investiture to damehood was held at Buckingham Palace in 2004. In April 2002 Secretary-General Kofi Annan named Goodall a United Nations Messenger of Peace. Her other honours included the Tyler Prize for Environmental Achievement, the French Legion of Honour, Order of the Torch of Kilimanjaro of Tanzania, Japan's prestigious Kyoto Prize, the Benjamin Franklin Medal in Life Science, the Gandhi-King Award for Nonviolence and the Spanish Prince of Asturias Awards.

Goodall received many tributes, honours and awards from local governments, schools, institutions, and charities around the world. Goodall was honoured by The Walt Disney Company with a plaque on the Tree of Life at Disney's Animal Kingdom theme park, alongside a carving of her beloved David Greybeard, the original chimpanzee that approached Goodall during her first year at Gombe. She was a member of both the American Academy of Arts and Sciences and the American Philosophical Society.

In 2010 Dave Matthews and Tim Reynolds held a benefit concert at DAR Constitution Hall in Washington, D.C., to commemorate "Gombe 50: a global celebration of Jane Goodall's pioneering chimpanzee research and inspiring vision for our future". Time magazine named Goodall as one of the 100 most influential people in the world in 2019. In 2021, she received the Templeton Prize.

On 31 December 2021 Goodall was the guest editor of the BBC Radio Four Today programme. She chose Francis Collins to be presenter of Thought for the Day.

In 2022 Goodall received the Stephen Hawking Medal for Science Communication for her long-term study of social and family interactions of wild chimpanzees.

In April 2023, Goodall was awarded as Officer of the Order of Orange-Nassau in a ceremony in The Hague, the Netherlands.

In October 2024 Goodall gave "A Speech for History" at UNESCO.

In January 2025 Goodall was awarded the Presidential Medal of Freedom by US President Joe Biden.

In December 2025, PETA posthumously gave her their "Person of the Year" award, commemorating her "legacy of kindness."

== Personal life ==
Goodall was married twice. On 28 March 1964 she married Baron Hugo van Lawick, a Dutch nobleman and wildlife photographer, at Chelsea Old Church, London. She was known during their marriage as Baroness Jane van Lawick-Goodall. The couple had a son, Hugo (nicknamed "Grub"), born in 1967. Goodall and Van Lawick divorced in 1974. The following year, she married Derek Bryceson, a former member of Tanzania's parliament and the director of that country's national parks. Bryceson died of cancer in October 1980. Owing to his position in the Tanzanian government as head of the country's national park system, Bryceson was able to protect Goodall's research project and implement an embargo on tourism at Gombe.

Goodall stated that dogs, and not the chimps she studied, were her favourite animal. She had been diagnosed with prosopagnosia, which made it difficult to recognise familiar faces. She lived in Bournemouth, England.

=== Opinions and beliefs ===
==== Bigfoot ====
Goodall was known to have supported the possibility that undiscovered species of primates may still exist, including cryptids such as Sasquatch, Yeren and other types of Bigfoot. She talked about this possibility in various interviews and debates. In 2012, Goodall remarked on Bigfoot: "I'm fascinated and would actually love them to exist," adding, "Of course, it's strange that there has never been a single authentic hide or hair of the Bigfoot, but I've read all the accounts."

==== Religion and spirituality ====
Goodall was raised in a Christian congregationalist family. As a young woman, she took night classes in Theosophy. Her family were occasional churchgoers, but Goodall began attending more regularly as a teenager when the church appointed a new minister, Trevor Davies. "He was highly intelligent and his sermons were powerful and thought-provoking... I could have listened to his voice for hours... I fell madly in love with him... Suddenly, no one had to encourage me to go to church. Indeed, there were never enough services for my liking." Of her later discovery of the atheism and agnosticism of many of her scientific colleagues, Goodall wrote that "[f]ortunately, by the time I got to Cambridge I was twenty-seven years old and my beliefs had already moulded so that I was not influenced by these opinions."

In Reason for Hope: A Spiritual Journey (1999), Goodall described the implications of a mystical experience she had at Notre Dame Cathedral in 1977: "Since I cannot believe that this was the result of chance, I have to admit anti-chance. And so I must believe in a guiding power in the universe – in other words, I must believe in God." When asked if she believes in God, Goodall said in September 2010: "I don't have any idea of who or what God is. But I do believe in some great spiritual power. I feel it particularly when I'm out in nature. It's just something that's bigger and stronger than what I am or what anybody is. I feel it. And it's enough for me." When asked in the same year if she still considers herself a Christian, Goodall told The Guardian: "I suppose so; I was raised as a Christian." She stated further that she saw no contradiction between evolution and belief in God.

In her foreword to the 2017 book The Intelligence of the Cosmos by Ervin Laszlo, a philosopher of science who advocates quantum consciousness theory, Goodall wrote: "we must accept that there is an Intelligence driving the process [of evolution], that the Universe and life on Earth are inspired and in-formed by an unknown and unknowable Creator, a Supreme Being, a Great Spiritual Power."

== In popular culture ==
Stevie Nicks's song "Jane", written in 1990, celebrates Goodall's life and work. It is the last track on Nicks's 1994 Street Angel album.

On 3 March 2022, in celebration of Women's History Month and International Women's Day, the Lego Group issued set number 40530, A Jane Goodall Tribute, depicting a Goodall minifigure and three chimpanzees in an African forest scene.

In 2022 Mattel released a Barbie-themed Goodall doll from recycled plastic in field attire with binoculars and a notebook. According to Mattel, the doll was made in recognition of Goodall's "decades of dedication, ground-breaking research, and heroic achievements as a conservationist, animal behavior expert, and activist".

=== Gary Larson cartoon incident ===
In 1987 Gary Larson published a Far Side cartoon of two chimpanzees grooming, in which one discovers a blonde hair and says, "Conducting a little more 'research' with that Jane Goodall tramp?" The Jane Goodall Institute called the cartoon an "atrocity" in a letter drafted by its lawyers to Larson and his syndicate. Goodall, who was in Africa at the time, later found the cartoon amusing. She went on to name it her favourite depiction of herself in pop culture.

Larson offered profits from sales of a shirt featuring the cartoon to the Jane Goodall Institute. Goodall wrote the preface to The Far Side Gallery 5, detailing her version of the controversy. She praised Larson's creative ideas, which often compare and contrast the behaviour of humans and animals. In 1988 Larson visited Goodall's research facility in Tanzania. While there, he was attacked by a chimpanzee named Frodo.

=== Television and film ===
The Simpsons parodied Goodall in the 2001 episode "Simpson Safari", in which the scientist researcher Dr Joan Bushwell was written as an indirect parody of her. She voiced herself in the 2019 episode "Gorillas on the Mast".

Goodall also voiced herself in The Wild Thornberrys episode "The Trouble with Darwin" where she is portrayed as visiting a chimpanzee sanctuary in Tanzania. The episode was later adapted into a children's book by Kiki Thorpe.

In February 2021 Apple TV+ ordered Jane, a live action/animation hybrid educational children's television programme which was created by J. J. Johnson co-produced by Sinking Ship Entertainment and the Jane Goodall Institute based on Goodall's missions. It ran for three series, and Goodall appeared as herself in its twentieth and final episode, which aired on 18 April 2025.

In October 2025, following Goodall's death, it was announced that a documentary about her life was being worked on by the filmmaker Richard Ladkani.

== Works ==
=== Books ===
Sources:

- 1969: My Friends the Wild Chimpanzees. Washington, DC: National Geographic Society.
- 1971: Innocent Killers (with H. van Lawick). Boston: Houghton Mifflin; London: Collins.
- 1971: In the Shadow of Man. Boston: Houghton Mifflin; London: Collins. Published in 48 languages.
- 1986: The Chimpanzees of Gombe: Patterns of Behavior. Boston: Belknap Press of the Harvard University Press. Published also in Japanese and Russian. R.R. Hawkins Award for the Outstanding Technical, Scientific or Medical book of 1986, to Bellknap Press of Harvard University Press, Boston. The Wildlife Society (USA) Award for "Outstanding Publication in Wildlife Ecology and Management"
- 1990: Through a Window: 30 Years Observing the Gombe Chimpanzees. London: Weidenfeld & Nicolson; Boston: Houghton Mifflin. Translated into more than 15 languages. 1991 Penguin edition, UK. American Library Association "Best" list among Nine Notable Books (Nonfiction) for 1991.
- 1991: Visions of Caliban (co-authored with Dale Peterson, PhD). Boston: Houghton Mifflin. New York Times "Notable Book" for 1993. Library Journal "Best Sci-Tech Book" for 1993.
- 1999: Brutal Kinship (with Michael Nichols). New York: Aperture Foundation'
- 1999: Reason for Hope: A Spiritual Journey (with Phillip Berman). New York: Warner Books, Inc. Translated into Japanese and Portuguese.
- 2000: 40 Years at Gombe. New York: Stewart, Tabori, and Chang.
- 2000: Africa In My Blood (edited by Dale Peterson). New York: Houghton Mifflin Company.
- 2001: Beyond Innocence: An Autobiography in Letters, the Later Years (edited by Dale Peterson). New York: Houghton Mifflin Company. ISBN 0-618-12520-5 .
- 2002: The Ten Trusts: What We Must Do to Care for the Animals We Love (with Marc Bekoff). San Francisco: Harper San Francisco.
- 2005: Harvest for Hope: A Guide to Mindful Eating. New York: Warner Books, Inc. ISBN 0-446-53362-9.
- 2009: Hope for Animals and Their World: How Endangered Species Are Being Rescued from the Brink Grand Central Publishing. ISBN 0-446-58177-1.
- 2013: Seeds of Hope: Wisdom and Wonder from the World of Plants (with Gail Hudson) Grand Central Publishing. ISBN 1-4555-1322-9. ^{In the book she examined the critical role that trees and plants play in our world. However, Hachette Book Group did not release the book due to the discovery of plagiarised portions. A reviewer for The Washington Post had found unattributed sections that were copied from websites about organic tea and tobacco and an "amateurish astrology site", as well as from Wikipedia. Goodall apologised and stated, "It is important to me that the proper sources are credited, and I will be working diligently with my team to address all areas of concern. My goal is to ensure that when this book is released it is not only up to the highest of standards, but also that the focus be on the crucial messages it conveys." The book was released on 1 April 2014, after review and the addition of 57 pages of endnotes. After the release, Goodall blamed her "chaotic note taking" for the plagiarism accusations and revised the book after the allegations.}
- 2021: The Book of Hope, with Douglas Abrams and Gail Hudson, Viking

==== Children's books ====
- 1972: Grub: The Bush Baby (with H. van Lawick). Boston: Houghton Mifflin.
- 1988: My Life with the Chimpanzees. New York: Byron Preiss Visual Publications, Inc. Translated into French, Japanese and Chinese. Parenting's Reading-Magic Award for Outstanding Book for Children, 1989.
- 1989: The Chimpanzee Family Book Saxonville: Picture Book Studio; Munich: Neugebauer Press; London: Picture Book Studio. Translated into more than 15 languages, including Japanese and Swahili. The UNICEF Award for the best children's book of 1989. Austrian state prize for best children's book of 1990.
- 1989: Jane Goodall's Animal World: Chimps. New York: Macmillan.
- 1989: Animal Family Series: Chimpanzee Family; Lion Family; Elephant Family; Zebra Family; Giraffe Family; Baboon Family; Hyena Family; Wildebeest Family. Toronto: Madison Marketing Ltd.
- 1994: With Love, New York; London: North-South Books. Translated into German, French, Italian, and Japanese.
- 1999: Dr. White (illustrated by Julie Litty). New York: North-South Books.
- 2000: The Eagle & the Wren (illustrated by Alexander Reichstein). New York: North-South Books.
- 2001: Chimpanzees I Love: Saving Their World and Ours. New York: Scholastic Press.
- 2002: (Foreword) "Slowly, Slowly, Slowly," Said the Sloth by Eric Carle. Philomel Books.
- 2004: Rickie and Henri: A True Story (with Alan Marks). Penguin Young Readers Group.

=== Films ===
Goodall is the subject of more than 40 films:

- 1965: Miss Goodall and the Wild Chimpanzees. National Geographic Society.
- 1973: Jane Goodall and the World of Animal Behavior: The Wild Dogs of Africa with Hugo van Lawick.
- 1975: Miss Goodall: The Hyena Story: The World of Animal Behavior Series 16mm for DiscoVision (not released on LaserDisc).
- 1976: "Lions of the Serengeti", an episode of The World About Us on BBC2.
- 1984: Among the Wild Chimpanzees. National Geographic Special.
- 1988: People of the Forest with Hugo van Lawick.
- 1990: Chimpanzee Alert in the Nature Watch Series, Central Television.
- 1990: The Life and Legend of Jane Goodall. National Geographic Society.
- 1990: The Gombe Chimpanzees. Bavarian Television.
- 1995: Fifi's Boys for the Natural World series for the BBC.
- 1996: Chimpanzee Diary for BBC2 Animal Zone.
- 1997: Animal Minds for the BBC.
- 2000: Jane Goodall: Reason For Hope PBS special produced by KTCA.
- 2001 "Chimps R Us, on season 11, episode 8". Scientific American Frontiers. Chedd-Angier Production Company. 2000–2001. PBS. Archived from the original on 1 January 2006.
- 2002: Jane Goodall's Wild Chimpanzees (IMAX format), in collaboration with Science North.
- 2005: Jane Goodall's Return to Gombe for Animal Planet.
- 2006: Chimps, So Like Us. HBO film nominated for 1990 Academy Award.
- 2007: When Animals Talk, We Should Listen theatrical documentary feature co-produced by Animal Planet
- 2010: Jane's Journey. Theatrical documentary feature co-produced by Animal Planet.
- 2012: Chimpanzee. Theatrical nature documentary feature co-produced by Disneynature.
- 2017: Jane biographical documentary film National Geographic Studios, in association with Public Road Productions. The film is directed and written by Brett Morgen, music by Philip Glass
- 2018: Zayed's Antarctic Lights. Dr Goodall featured in the Environment Agency-Abu Dhabi film that screened on National Geographic-Abu Dhabi and won a World Medal at the New York Film and TV Awards.
- 2019: Exploring Hans Hass. Dr Jane Goodall featured in the biographical documentary film about the legendary diving pioneer and filmmaker Hans Hass.
- 2020: Jane Goodall: The Hope, biographical documentary film, National Geographic Studios, produced by Lucky 8
- 2023: Jane Goodall: Reasons for Hope is an IMAX format documentary about successful projects to restore Earth's wildlife habitat, animals, birds and environment.

== See also ==
- Animal faith – Ritual behavior in non-humans
- Dian Fossey – The trimate who studied gorillas until her murder
- Birutė Galdikas – The trimate who dedicated herself to orangutan study
- List of animal rights advocates
- Nonhuman Rights Project – American non-profit organization
- Timeline of women in science
- USC Jane Goodall Research Center – Anthropological research center
- Washoe – Chimpanzee language research subject
- Steven M. Wise – American legal scholar (1950–2024)
- Chimpanzee violence
