= Roberts High School =

School in Salem, Oregon, United States

Coordinates: 44.927787°N 122.988834°W

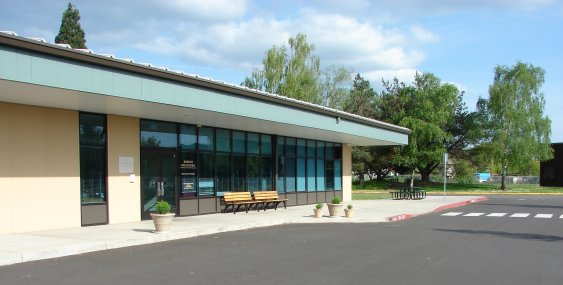

Location
- 3620 State Street; Salem, (Marion County), Oregon 97301; United States

Information
- School type: Alternative, secondary
- Founded: 1996
- School board: Salem-Keizer Public Schools
- Superintendent: Christy Perry
- Staff: 36.56 (FTE)
- Grades: 10-12
- Enrollment: 425 (2017–18)
- Student to teacher ratio: 11.62
- Website: roberts.salkeiz.k12.or.us

Roberts High School is a high school in Salem, Oregon, United States. It provides non-traditional educational programs in the Salem-Keizer School District. Rather than a centralized campus, Roberts High School consists of departments at different sites in Salem and Keizer. These branch sites include the Downtown Learning Center, Structured Learning Center, Bridge, and Internet-based SK Online. In the 2006-2007 school year, over 1,000 students were enrolled in Roberts High School.

Roberts High Schools is named in honor of former Oregon governor Barbara Roberts.

== Web-based curriculum ==
SK Online provides web-based curriculum for students who need accelerated learning, are credit deficient, have scheduling conflicts in a traditional school, are home schooled, need remediation, or are medically fragile. Students under the age of 21 who reside within the Salem-Keizer Public School District are eligible to fully enroll with SK Online. SK Online also serves students enrolled at other schools or districts by prior arrangement.

== Courses and programs ==
Students enrolled in SK Online can earn a Roberts HS diploma or may transition to a neighborhood high school or another branch of Roberts High School.

Programs include Bridge, an online learning program designed to help credit deficient 11th and 12th grade students complete the requirements for a Salem-Keizer high school diploma; the Downtown Learning Center, which hosts a daytime Bridge option to accommodate the need for flexible scheduling; The Structured Learning Center, which addresses the needs of secondary-level students with severe behavior issues or expelled from their neighborhood schools; the Work Experience Program, which enables high school students who have jobs to gain elective credit through learning employment skills directly from their jobs; and the GED Option, located at the Downtown Learning Center, which serves Salem-Keizer Public Schools students ages 16 through 21 who need alternative education outside of their resident high school and who are deficient in credit.

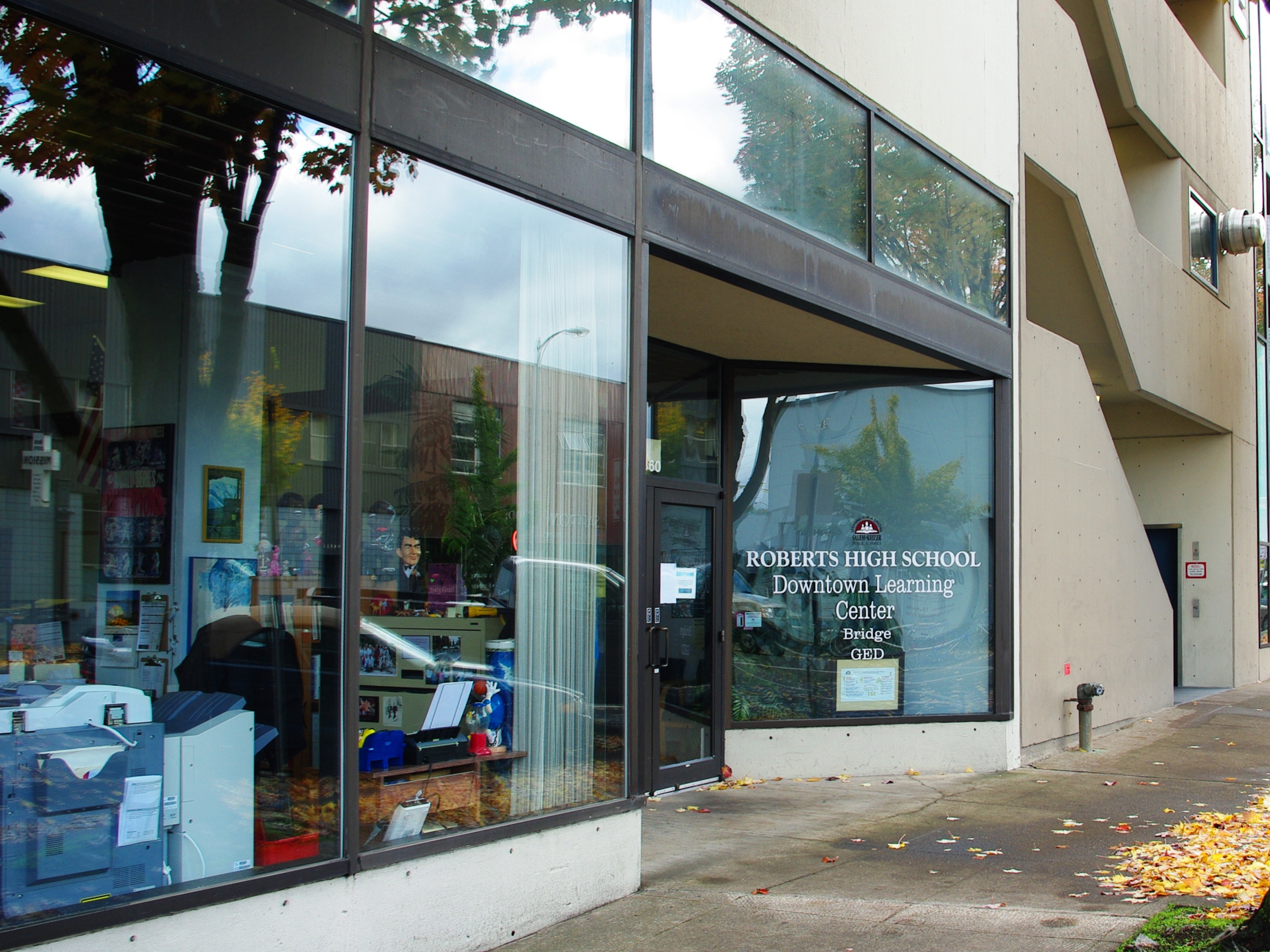
The Downtown Learning Center

Under contract with the Oregon Youth Authority, Roberts High School provides education services for juveniles who are incarcerated at the Marion County Juvenile Detention facility.

Marion County Corrections Facility Education Program, located in the Marion County Jail, serves juveniles who are incarcerated either awaiting trial or who are adjudicated and awaiting transfer to a state corrections facility.

== Academics ==
In 2008, 18% of the school's students received a high school diploma. Of 457 students, 83 graduated, 245 dropped out, one received a modified diploma, and 128 were still in high school the following year.
