= Roots & Shoots =

Youth organization for environmental and community work

- Founded: 1991; 35 years ago
- Founder: Jane Goodall
- Type: Non-profit Organization
- Purpose: Environmentalism, Conservation, Humanitarianism
- Location: Vienna, Virginia, U.S.
- Origins: Dar es Salaam, Tanzania
- Region served: World wide
- Method: Community action, service projects, youth-led campaigns, networking with youth
- Key people: Jane Goodall (Founder); Erin Viera-Orr (Associate Vice President Roots & Shoots); Adrienne Bermingham (Program Coordinator); Stephanie Keller (Education Projects Manager); Kamilah Martin (Associate Director); Hope Martinez (Youth Leadership Program Manager); Emily Rhodes (Education Manager)
- Website: rootsandshoots.org

Roots & Shoots was founded by Jane Goodall, DBE, in 1991, to bring together youth from preschool to university age to work on environmental, conservation, and humanitarian issues. The organization has local chapters in more than 140 countries, with more than 8000 local groups worldwide that involve nearly 150,000 young people. Many of the chapters operate through schools and other organizations. Participants are encouraged to identify and work on problems in their communities affecting people, animals, or the environment. Charity Navigator has awarded Roots & Shoots and its parent non-profit organization, the Jane Goodall Institute, its highest four-star rating for accountability and transparency, with 78.1% of its expenses going directly to the programs.

== Origin ==
Roots & Shoots was founded in 1991 when Jane Goodall started giving talks at local schools in Tanzania. A group of 12 of her students, selected by their classmates, met with Goodall at her home to discuss their local environmental concerns and figure out what they could do to help. These 12 students became the first members of Roots & Shoots, and the organization grew from there. Of the original 12 students, one eventually went on to serve as the Minister of Environment for Tanzania. Another became the Roots & Shoots' National Director for Tanzania.

== Curricula ==
The Roots & Shoots curriculum is split into elementary, middle, and high school lesson plans. The program encourages young people to create projects that support campaigns.

== Branches ==
There are active Roots & Shoots branches in at least 27 countries, with offices in Abu Dhabi, Argentina, Australia, Austria, Belgium, China, Canada, Columbia, Japan, Republic of the Congo, Democratic Republic of Congo, France, Germany, Hong Kong, Indonesia, Italy, Kenya, Puerto Rico, Nepal, New Zealand, Singapore, South Africa, South Korea, Spain, Taiwan, Tanzania, Uganda, the United Kingdom, and the United States.

=== China ===
China has four main Roots & Shoots branches in Beijing, Shanghai, Chengdu, and Hong Kong that support more than 600 primary school groups.

=== Taiwan ===
In Taiwan, Roots and Shoots has been established in many schools and universities.

=== United States ===
==== Tulsa, Oklahoma ====
Riverfield Country Day School in Tulsa has implemented the Roots & Shoots program.

==== Tucson, Arizona ====
Empire High School in Tucson has also implemented the Roots & Shoots program.
