= Jane Goodall Institute =

Wildlife and environment conservation organization

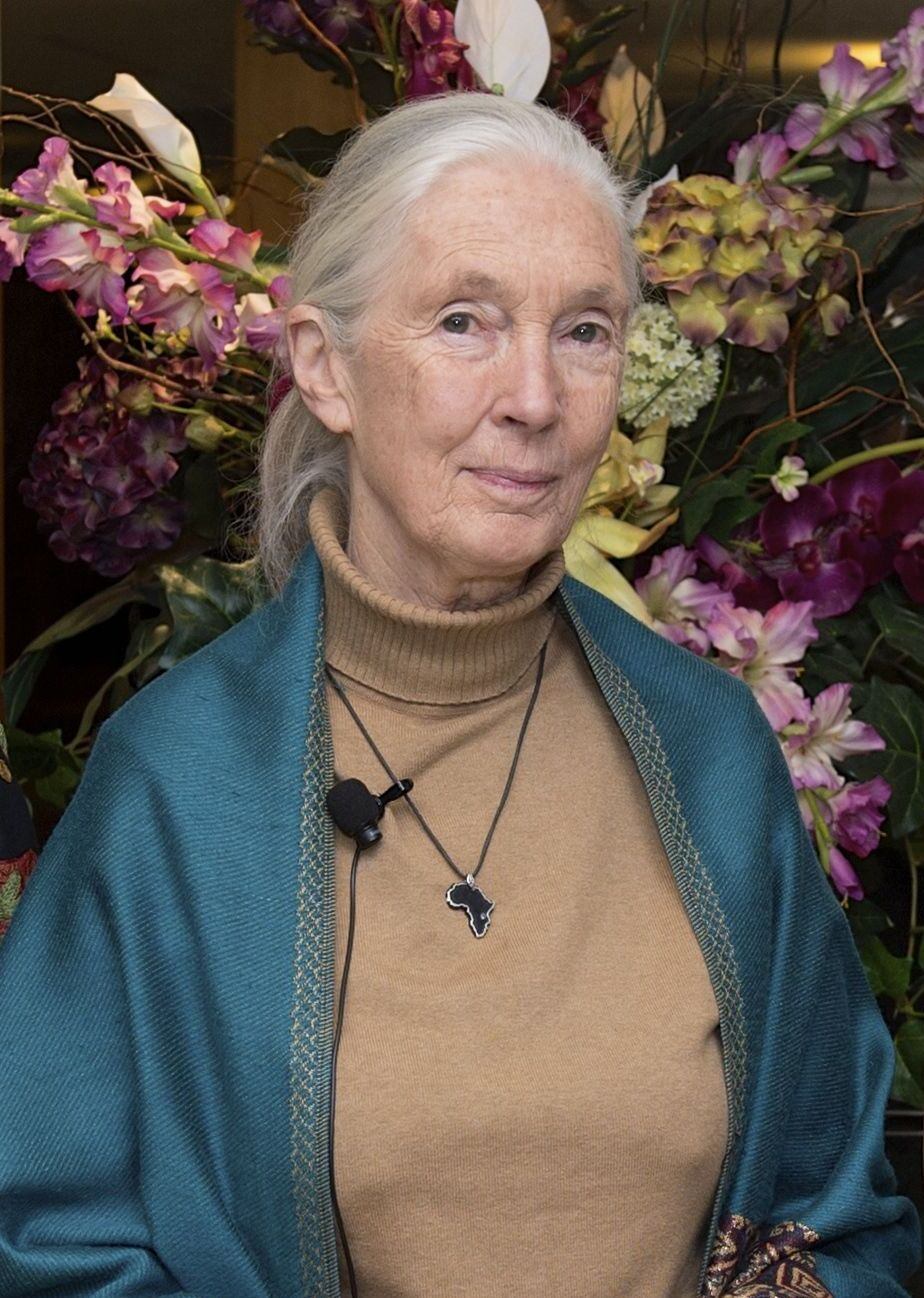
Jane Goodall, founder of the institute

The Jane Goodall Institute (JGI) is a global non-profit wildlife and environment conservation organization headquartered in Washington, D.C. It was founded in 1977 by English primatologist Jane Goodall (1934–2025) and Genevieve di San Faustino (1919–2011). The institute's mission is to improve the treatment and understanding of primates through public education and legal representation, to protect their habitats in partnership with local communities, and to recruit and train young people for these missions.

== History ==
Jane Goodall began her career in 1960 in Gombe National Park, Tanzania. Her research on chimpanzees proved that they are close to humans not only genetically, but also in their behavior. At the beginning of her research, she was able to work in an untouched forest, but over the years, the local population cleared larger and larger areas of trees and destroyed animals. Jane Goodall realized that in order for the chimpanzees to survive, she had to protect their habitat, but for this, it was necessary that the living conditions of the local population were suitable and that they cooperated in nature conservation work, knowing the common goal. This led to the founding of the Jane Goodall Institute.

At first, the daily activities of the institute were carried out from home by committee members and volunteers. In the early 1980s, the institute moved into the San Francisco office of the California Academy of Sciences and later to Washington, D.C.

== Offices and partnerships ==
The institute has offices in more than twenty-five countries around the world. With the recognition of a non-governmental organization by the city's municipal government, the Shanghai office became the first and only foreign environmental protection organization in China.

There is also a close partnership with the Jane Goodall Center for Excellence in Environmental Studies at the American Western Connecticut State University in Danbury in northern Connecticut.

In Congo, the institute has maintained the Tchimpounga Chimpanzee Rehabilitation Center since 1999. It has 26 hectares of land at its disposal and a protected area of 72.84 km² was set up nearby by the government of Congo in March 1999. It is used to house orphaned chimpanzees.

Jane Goodall Environmental Middle School is a grades 6 through 8 school in Salem, Oregon, with a focus on environmental protection.

=== Cetacean Committee ===
In 2022, the JGI's Cetacean Committee was formed. It calls for an immediate worldwide ban on cetacean captivity, with a search for "the best outcomes for those already confined."

On August 21, 2023, Melody Horrill from the committee commented on the recent death of the orca Tokitae (Lolita). Tokitae had spent half a century performing in a concrete tank for the Miami Seaquarium's previous owners, after being captured in the Pacific Northwest in 1970. Tokitae’s death came at a time when efforts were underway to move her to a sanctuary in her natal waters, but she died before she could have the opportunity to experience her natal waters again.

Horrill said:

We are devastated that Tokitae will never receive what she was entitled to from the start – her freedom. Her death is a tragic reminder that no dolphins, whales, or porpoises should ever be kept in captivity for the purpose of entertainment. These highly intelligent, sensitive mammals deserve a natural life in the wild, free of exploitation.

== Activities ==
=== Protecting Great Apes ===
JGI works to protect chimpanzees and other primates by supporting sanctuaries, law enforcement efforts to reduce illegal trafficking, and public education to protect endangered species in the wild. The Chimp Eden Sanctuary in South Africa is one of the institute's sanctuaries. It is located in a forested reserve between Nelspruit and Barberton in Mpumalanga.

=== Improving gender and health outcomes ===
JGI achieves this through community-centered health projects, improvements to water supplies, and programs designed to keep girls in school.

=== Promoting sustainable livelihoods ===
JGI does this through improved agricultural practices, community-managed microcredit programs, and sustainable production techniques that increase incomes while protecting forests and watersheds.

== Cookbook ==
In 2021, the institute published a cookbook titled The Jane Goodall Institute #EatMeatless. The book's foreword was written by Goodall, a longtime vegetarian and now vegan. Vegan journalist Avery Yale Kamila included the cookbook on her list of 2021's best cookbooks. Food writer Mark Bittman interviewed Jane Goodall about the book on his podcast. Veganuary listed the book no. 1 on its list of Best Vegan Cookbooks.

== See also ==
- Roots & Shoots
- Tchimpounga Chimpanzee Sanctuary
- Artipoppe
