= Africa: The Serengeti =

- Directed by: George Casey
- Written by: George Casey; Mose Richards
- Narrated by: James Earl Jones
- Cinematography: Andrew Kitzanuk
- Edited by: Tim Huntley
- Music by: Hans Zimmer
- Release date: April 1, 1994
- Running time: 39 minutes
- Country: United States
- Language: English

Africa: The Serengeti is a documentary film directed by George Casey. It was filmed in 70mm on location in Tanzania's Serengeti National Park and Kenya's Masai Mara. This documentary film is narrated by James Earl Jones. It was originally released to IMAX theaters in 1994.

The film features nature cinematography during a year at East Africa's Serengeti plain. The Serengeti is a huge area of grassland in Tanzania. Once a year, in time of drought, animals travel north in order to survive. This "great migration", an event in which millions of wildebeests, zebras, and antelope travel several hundred miles across the plain, while lions and other dangers await them along the way, is considered one of the great wonders of the world.

Hans Zimmer, composer of The Lion King (where Jones lent his voice to Mufasa), contributed to the film soundtrack. Casey followed this film with another nature documentary, Alaska: Spirit of the Wild.

== See also ==
- Serengeti Symphony, a 1998 Dutch documentary film directed by Hugo van Lawick.
