= Serengeti Symphony =

1998 Dutch nature documentary film

- Theatrical release poster
- Directed by: Hugo van Lawick
- Produced by: Hugo van Lawick
- Narrated by: Arnold Gelderman
- Cinematography: Hugo van Lawick; Matthew Aeberhard
- Edited by: Manfred Poppenk; Alan Miller
- Music by: Laurens van Rooyen
- Production company: Nature Conservation Films
- Distributed by: Buena Vista International (Note: Distributed under the Walt Disney Pictures banner.)
- Release dates: 4 October 1998 (Tuschinski Theatre); 8 October 1998 (Netherlands)
- Running time: 88 minutes
- Country: Netherlands
- Language: Dutch
- Budget: ƒ7 million
- Box office: 28.607 admissions

Serengeti Symphony is a 1998 Dutch nature documentary film directed by Hugo van Lawick. The film focuses on animal life in the Serengeti in Tanzania. The film lacks narration except for the beginning and ending portions, instead relying on arrangements of classical music by composers such as Pyotr Ilyich Tchaikovsky, Claude Debussy, and Modest Mussorgsky. The film is shot in Serengeti National Park.

The film was released on 8 October 1998 by Buena Vista International under the Walt Disney Pictures banner. It received positive reviews from critics.

The film was released on VHS by Buena Vista Home Entertainment on 10 February 1999.

== See also ==
- Africa: The Serengeti, a 1994 documentary film directed by George Casey.
- SpangaS op Survival
- Fuchsia the Mini-Witch
