= Hugo van Lawick =

Dutch film director (1937–2002)

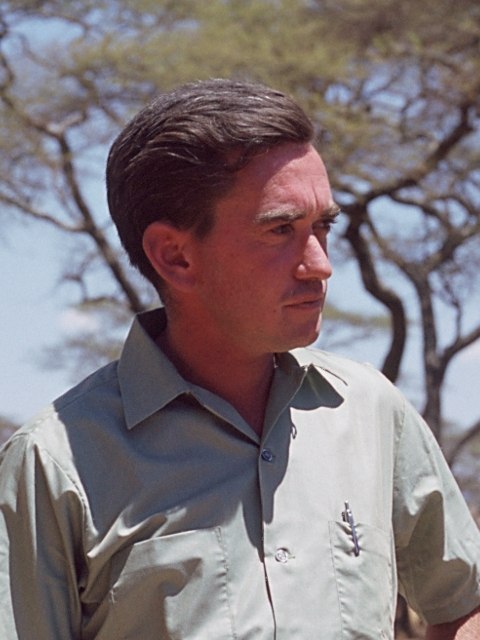
- Van Lawick in Serengeti National Park in 1969
- Born: Hugo Arndt Rodolf van Lawick; 10 April 1937; Surabaya, Dutch East Indies
- Died: 2 June 2002 (aged 65); Dar es Salaam, Tanzania
- Spouses: Jane Goodall (m. 1964; div. 1974) Theresa Rice (m. 1978; div. 1984)
- Children: 1

Hugo Arndt Rodolf, Baron van Lawick (10 April 1937 – 2 June 2002) was a Dutch wildlife filmmaker and photographer.

Through his still photographs and films, Van Lawick helped to popularise the study of chimpanzees during his wife Jane Goodall's studies at Gombe Stream National Park during the 1960s and 1970s. His films drew the attention of the viewing public to the dramatic life cycles of several wild animals of the Serengeti, such as wild dogs, elephants and lions.

== Early life ==
Hugo Arndt Rodolf van Lawick was born in Surabaya in the Dutch East Indies (now Indonesia) on 10 April 1937 as the son of Baron Hugo Anne Victor Raoul van Lawick (11 August 1909 – 17 June 1941) and Isabella Sophia van Ittersum (11 February 1913 – 30 December 1977).His father was a pilot with the Netherlands Naval Aviation Service, and upon his death while in service, Isabella moved Hugo and his brother first to Australia, then to England, where they lived successively in London, Hull, and Devon. In the last, Hugo was enrolled in boarding school, where he remained after his mother and brother moved to the Netherlands shortly after the end of the Second World War. In 1947 he joined them in Amersfoort.

== Photographer ==
In November 1959 Van Lawick went to Africa to pursue his passion of photographing and taking footage of wild animals, finding employment as a cameraman for a filmmaking couple. After a film he produced as the background to a lecture given by Louis Leakey was seen by a staff member at National Geographic, he was given a retainer for future work for the magazine.

On the recommendation of Leakey, in August 1962 he began photographing and filming chimpanzees of the Kasakela chimpanzee community at Gombe Stream National Park where Jane Goodall, Leakey's protégée, had been researching chimpanzees since July 1960. They married on 28 March 1964 in Chelsea Old Church, London. They lived in Tanzania for many years, both at Gombe and elsewhere on other research projects. In 1967 they had a son named Hugo Eric Louis, affectionately known as "Grub". They were divorced in 1974 but remained friends. On 23 March 1978, in Banjul, Gambia, Van Lawick married Theresa Rice. They were divorced on 19 January 1984.

Through Van Lawick's film People of the Forest viewers came to know members of Gombe's "F" family, namely Flo, Fifi and Flint, in addition to a number of their other immediate relations. By the time he stopped filming at Gombe, he had created a visual record spanning over 20 years and documenting the lives of three generations of chimpanzees. Van Lawick made a number of wildlife documentaries for television, but also made several films for theatrical release on 35 mm film, such as The Leopard Son (1996) and Serengeti Symphony, both produced by Nature Conservation Films WW. Besides making films himself, Van Lawick was an important influence and mentor to a younger generation of wildlife filmmakers. His tented camp, Ndutu, in the Serengeti, became through his guidance a breeding ground for new wildlife filmmakers.

== Death and honours ==
In 1998 Van Lawick was forced to retire due to emphysema. He left Ndutu to live with his son, "Grub" in Dar es Salaam, Tanzania, where he died on 2 June 2002 at the age of 65. On 7 June, during a ceremony attended by family, friends, staff and government officials, he was buried at the place his tent had stood for over 30 years in his camp in the Serengeti.

Van Lawick won eight Emmy Awards for his films, including the Primetime Emmy Award for Outstanding Cinematography for a Nonfiction Program sixteen years after his death for previously unreleased photography. He was appointed officer in the Order of the Golden Ark in 1992 by Prince Bernhard of the Netherlands, the co-founder of the World Wide Fund for Nature.

== Publications ==
- with Jane Goodall: Innocent Killers: A Fascinating Journey Through the Worlds of the Hyena, the Jackal, and the Wild Dog (1970)
- with Jane Goodall: In the Shadow of Man (1971)
- Savage Paradise - The Predators of Serengeti, Collins, St James Place, London 1977. ISBN 0-002167719.
- with Peter Matthiessen: Sand Rivers, Aurum Press, London 1981, ISBN 0-906053-22-6.

== Sources ==
- Dale Peterson, (2006) Jane Goodall: The Woman Who Redefined Man, pgs. 299–301.
