= Grumeti River =

River in Mara Region, Tanzania

Coordinates: 2°05′05″S 33°48′00″E

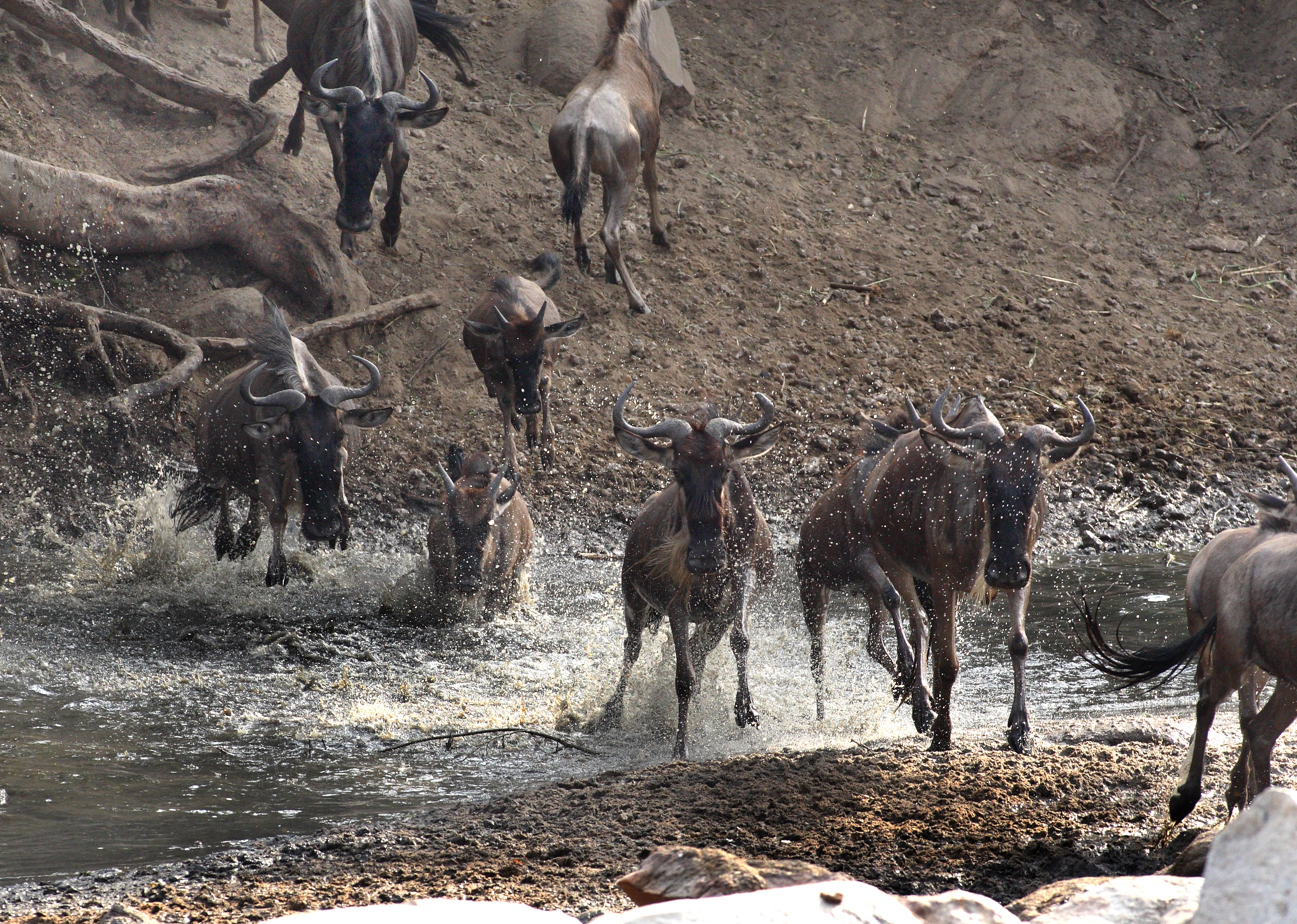
- Wildebeest crossing a small part of the river

Location
- Country: Tanzania

Physical characteristics
- Mouth
  - location: Speke Gulf, Lake Victoria

The Grumeti River is a river in Mara Region, Tanzania, situated almost entirely within the western corridor of Serengeti National Park. It flows westward and mouths into the Speke Gulf of Lake Victoria.

== Great migration crossing ==
It is a major river crossing for the Serengeti great migration. During May to August, thousands of wildebeest and other animals cross the crocodile-infested waters. It is famed for this sight alongside Mara River.
