= Myles Turner (park warden) =

English park warden (1921–1984)

Myles Turner (1921–1984) was the first warden of the Serengeti National Park in Tanzania, from 1956 to 1972. His efforts enabled the park to survive its formative years and grow into one of Africa's finest parks.

Turner was born in England but spent most of his childhood in Kenya. He served in Africa during World War II and joined the Kenya Game Department in 1946 as a Game Control Officer. Three years later, he became a hunting tour leader with an East African company. It was during this time that Turner learned much about the animals that he would later fight so hard to protect. In 1956, he married and accepted a job at the newly formed Serengeti National Park.

In his sixteen years as a warden, Turner worked to prevent poaching, developed the use of aircraft in park management, and directed the training of numerous Tanzanian wardens.

He later worked as an advisor to the Masai Mara Game Reserve in Kenya, which borders the Serengeti National Park.

Turner died of a sudden heart attack in 1984. He is buried in the Masai Mara Reserve, just a few steps away from the Tanzanian border.

His autobiography, My Serengeti Years, was published posthumously, and is a collection of stories and mental images of life in Africa in earlier times.

Turner married Kathleen Tubb and they had two children.

The Turner Spring area is named after him.
