= Alaska: Spirit of the Wild =

- Directed by: George Casey
- Written by: Mose Richards
- Narrated by: Charlton Heston
- Cinematography: Rodney Taylor
- Edited by: Tim Huntley
- Production company: Graphic Films
- Distributed by: Houston Museum of Natural Science
- Release date: 1997
- Running time: 40 minutes
- Country: United States
- Language: English

Alaska: Spirit of the Wild is a documentary film featuring the landscape and wildlife of Alaska. It is directed by George Casey, narrated by Charlton Heston and was distributed to IMAX theaters in 1997.

== Synopsis ==
Alaskan wildlife featured in the film include moose, bears, seals, wolves, caribou, and whales, while narrator Heston provides background information. Aerial and underwater photography are utilized throughout the production. Casey had previously created the documentary, Africa: The Serengeti, also for IMAX.

== Reception ==
The film has been well-received by critics and was nominated for the Academy Award for Best Documentary Short Subject in 1998.
