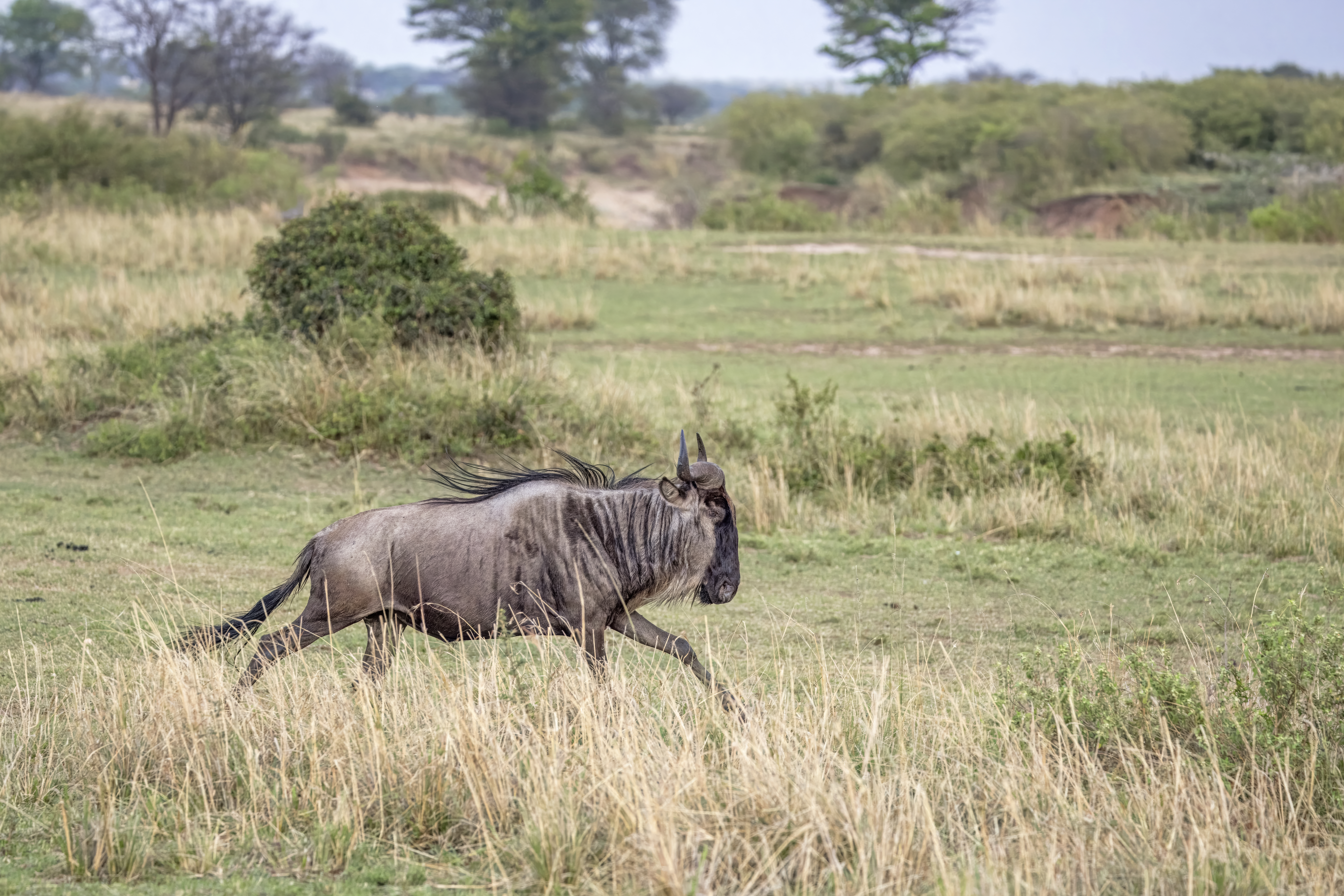
- In Serengeti National Park, Tanzania

Scientific classification
- Kingdom: Animalia
- Phylum: Chordata
- Class: Mammalia
- Order: Artiodactyla
- Family: Bovidae
- Subfamily: Alcelaphinae
- Genus: Connochaetes
- Species: C. taurinus
- Subspecies: C. t. mearnsi

Trinomial name
- Connochaetes taurinus mearnsi (Heller, 1913)
- C. t. mearnsi range (yellow)

Synonyms
- Gorgon albojubatus mearnsi (E.Heller, 1913)

= Western white-bearded wildebeest =

Subspecies of antelope

The western white-bearded wildebeest (Connochaetes taurinus mearnsi) also known as Mearn's white-bearded wildebeest, Mearn's wildebeest, Serengeti white-bearded wildebeest, or the Serengeti wildebeest, is a subspecies of the blue wildebeest being the smallest, and lightest subspecies of the species. It is one of the only subspecies of the blue wildebeest to have a sustainable population in Serengeti National Park, Tanzania, with over one million adult individuals. They are known for one of the greatest migrations to travel between Tanzania and Kenya.

== Description ==
The western white-bearded wildebeest on average reaches 1.3–1.42 m (4 ft 3 in – 4 ft 8 in) tall, and weighs 180–225 kg (397–496 lb) at its maximum weight. It has a long white beard, black front face, and a darker colored body, smaller horns, and a swaying dark black tail. It is 50 kg (110 pounds) lighter than the nominate subspecies, Connochaetes taurinus taurinus, and 10 cm (3.9 in) shorter.

== Distribution and habitat ==
The western white-bearded wildebeest is native to northwestern Tanzania, and southwestern Kenya. In Tanzania, its populations cover Serengeti National Park, being a very common sight there. They are also seen in the Masai Mara in Kenya.

Great wildebeest migration. Mara River crossing in Tanzania

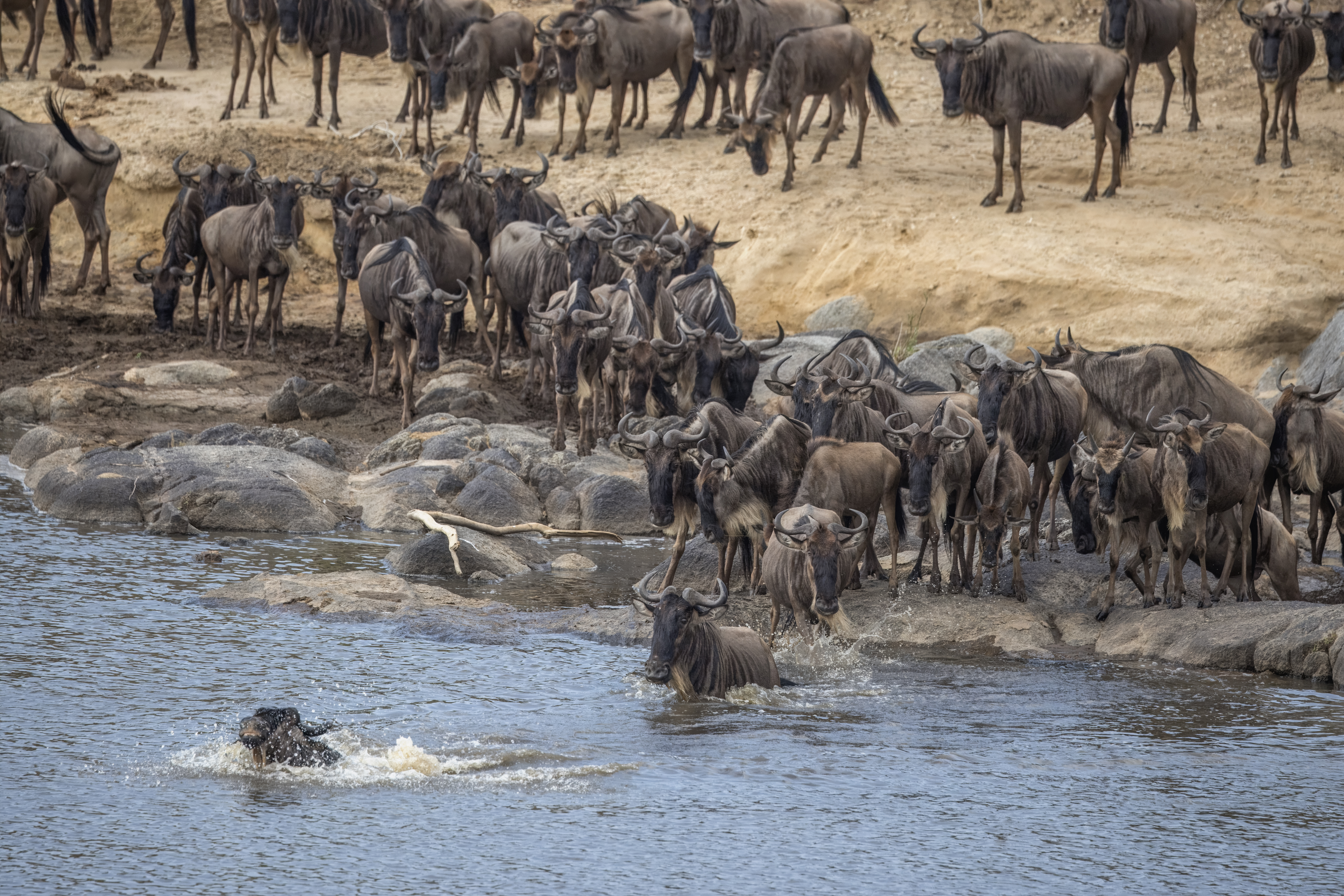
A wildebeest initiates the crossing.

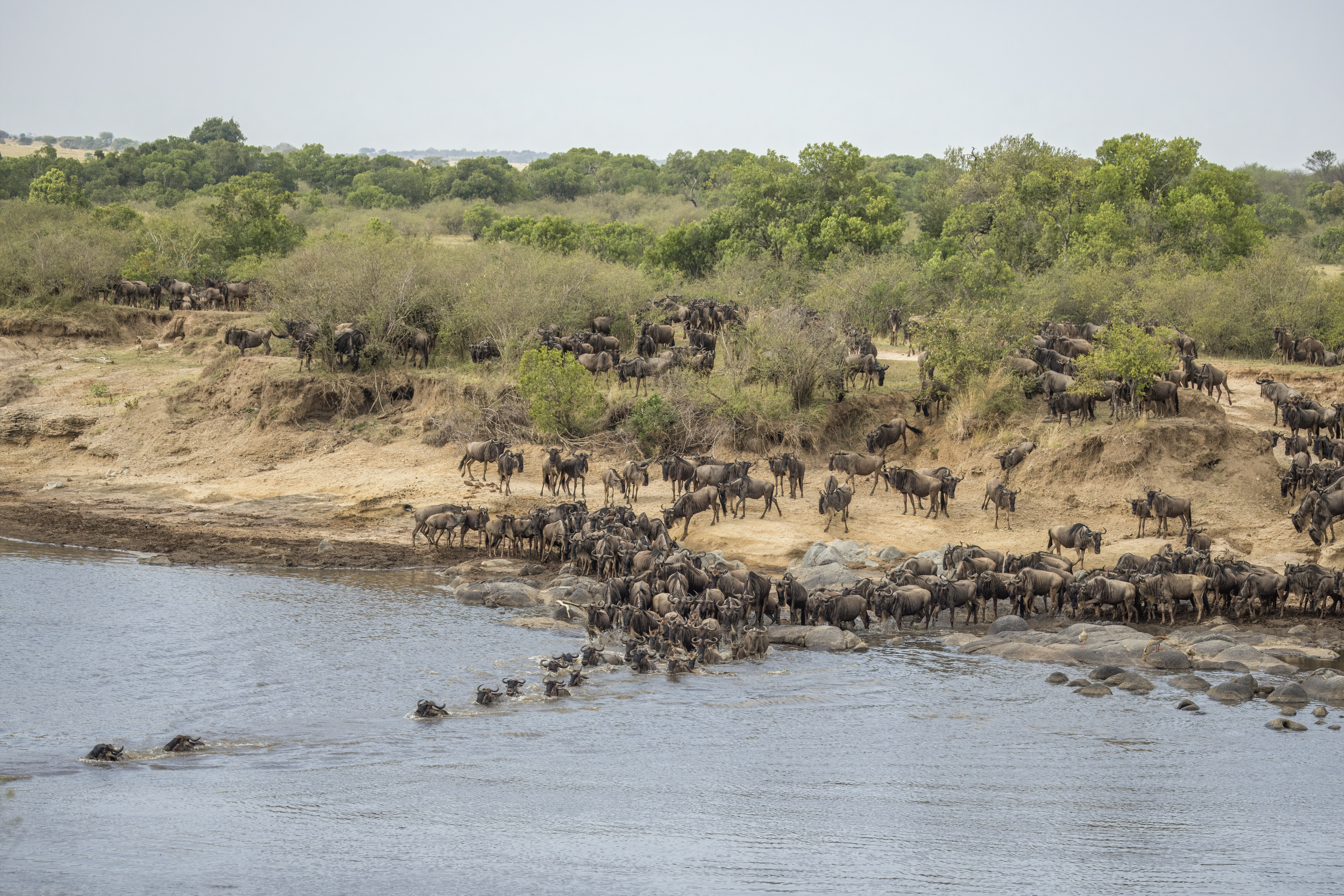
About 300 wildebeest follow the leader.

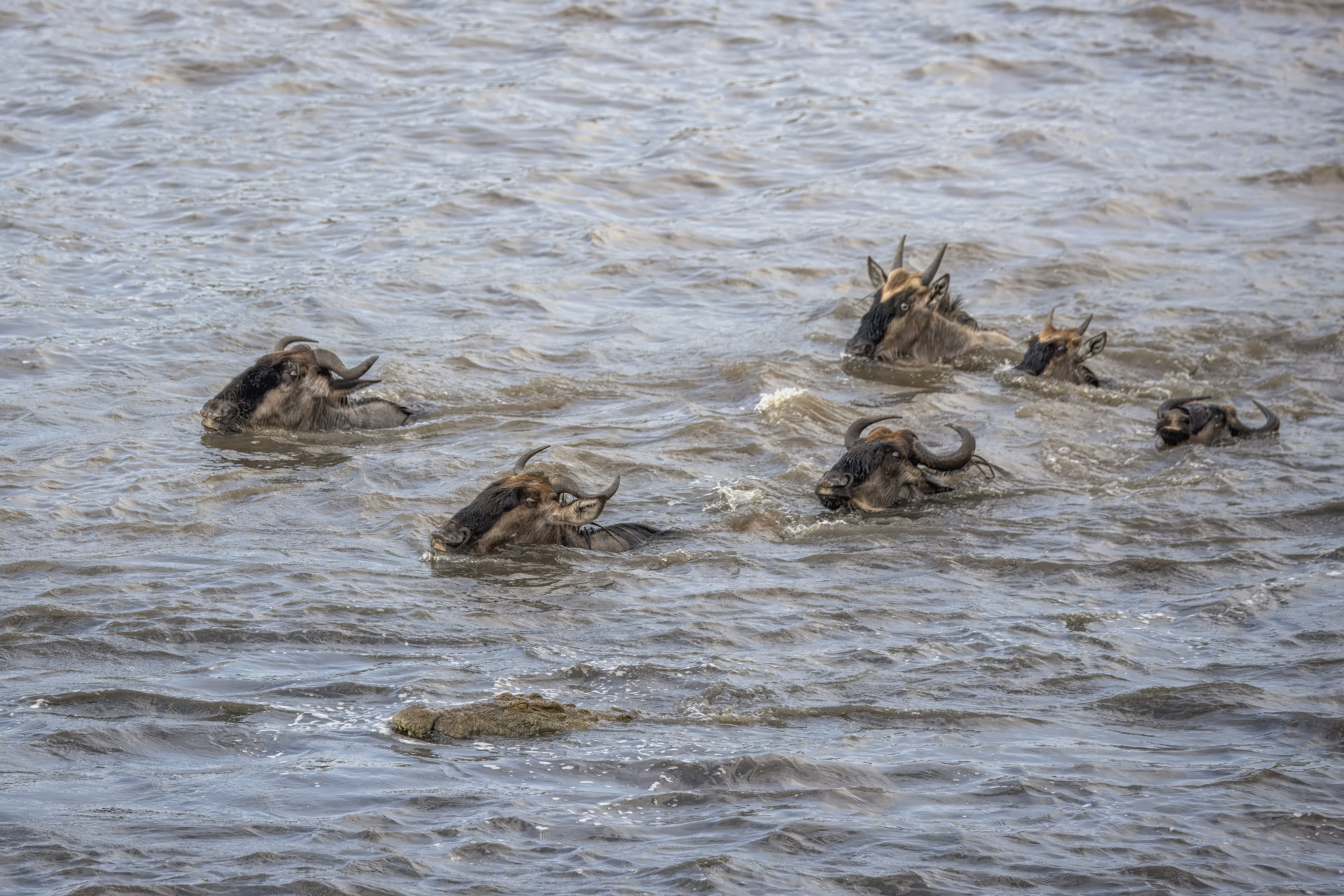
A crocodile approaches the swimming wildebeest.

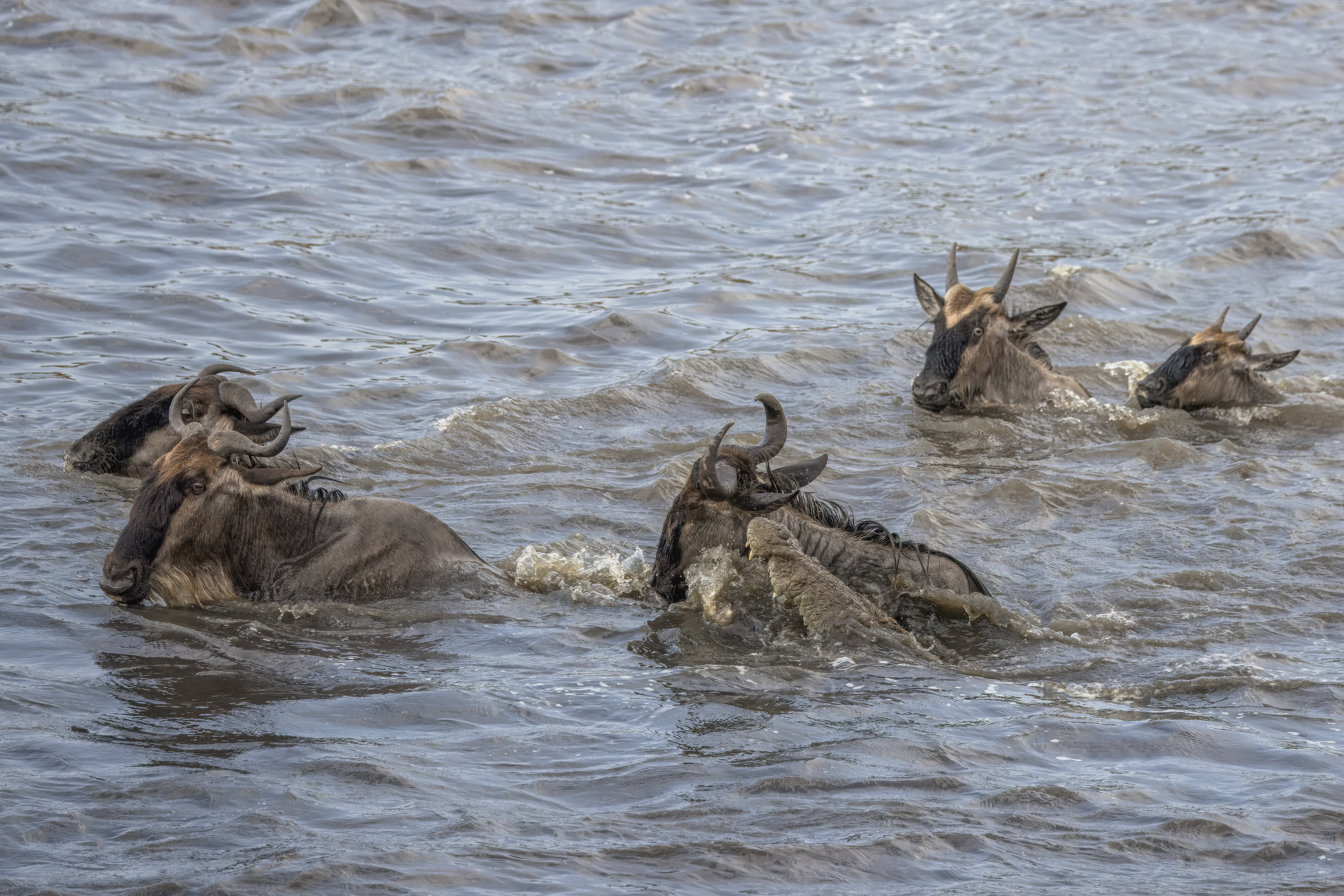
The crocodile attacks a swimming wildebeest.

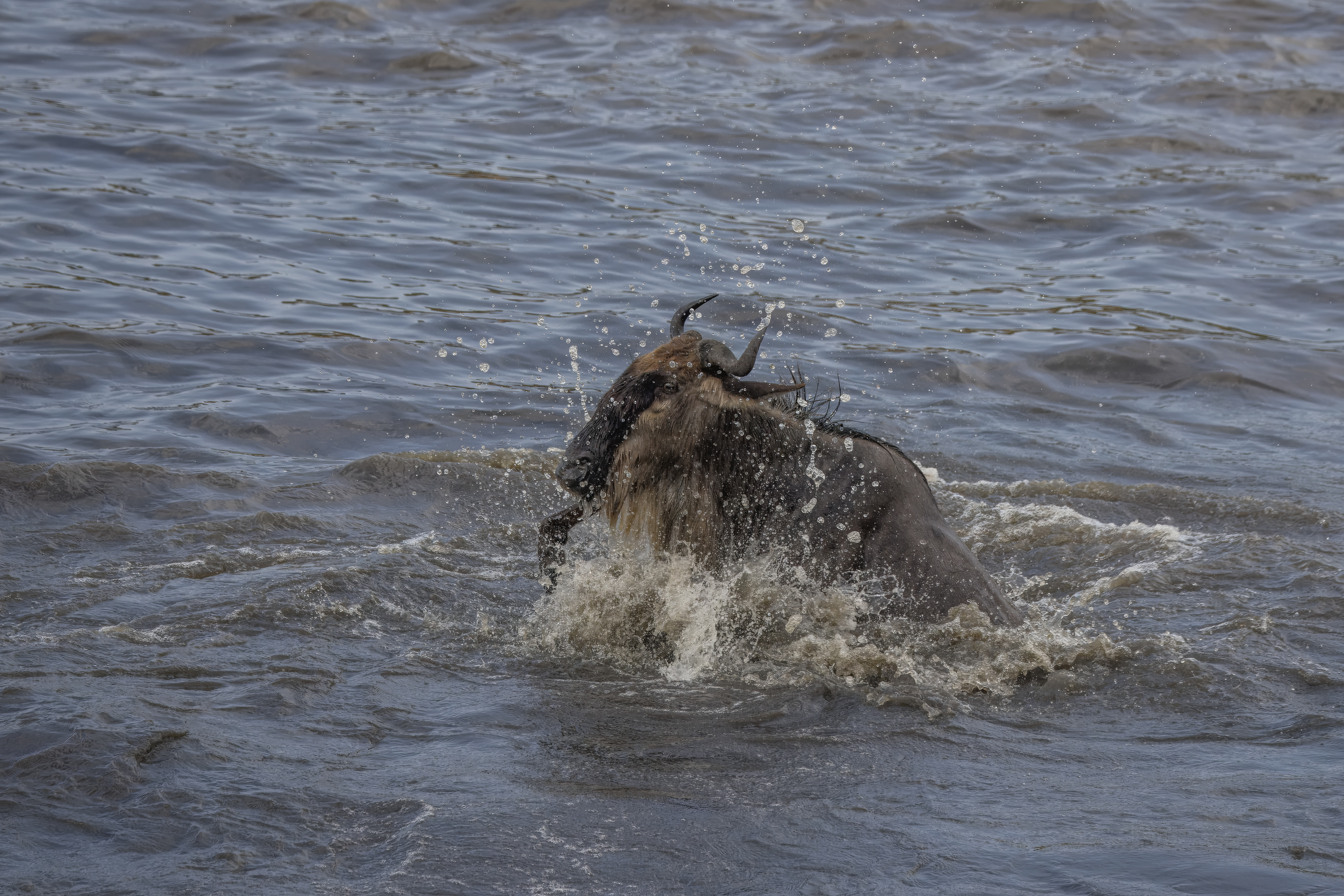
The wildebeest is dragged underwater by the crocodile.

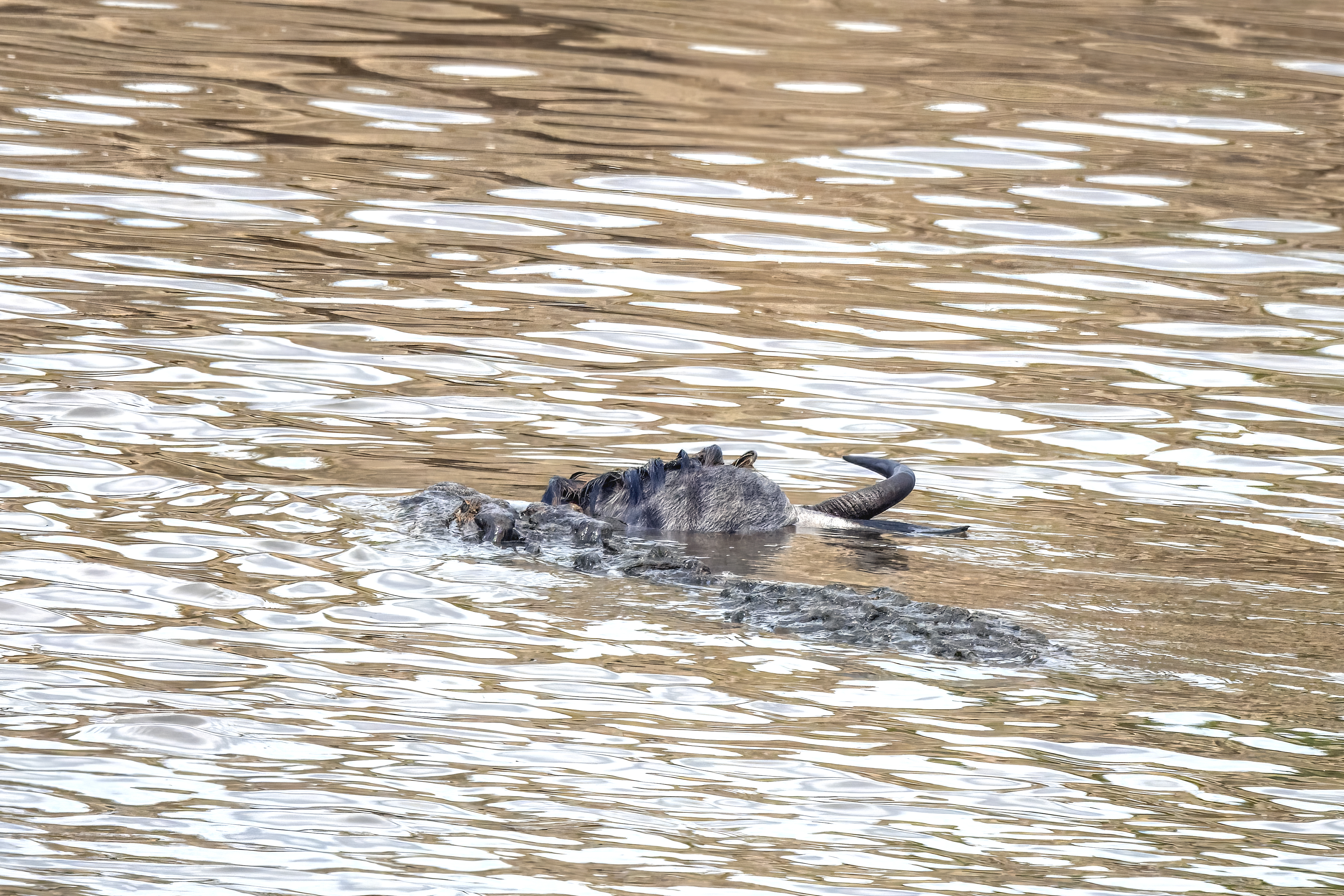
The crocodile surfaces after drowning the wildebeest.

A second crossing on the same day.

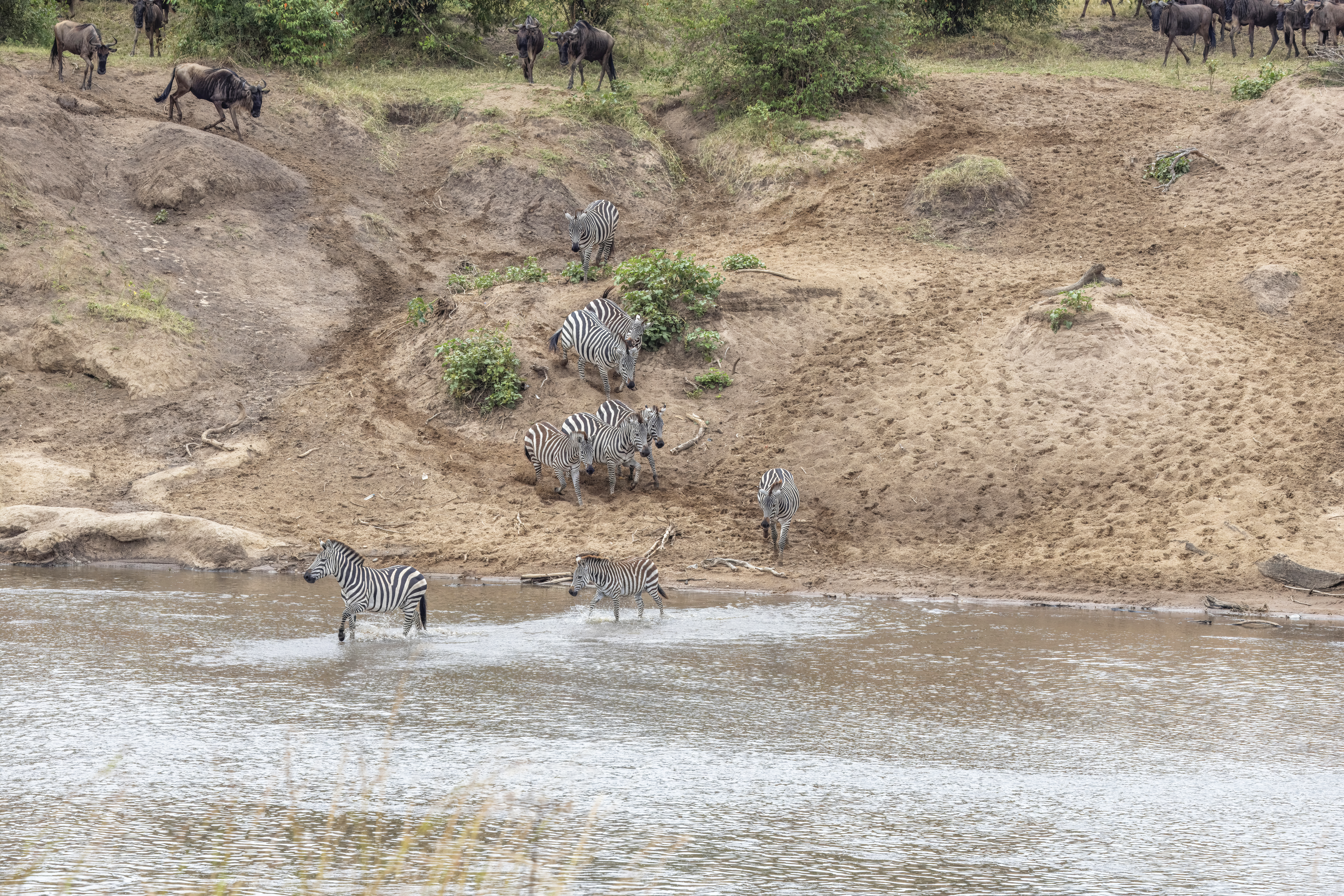
Zebras initiate the crossing.

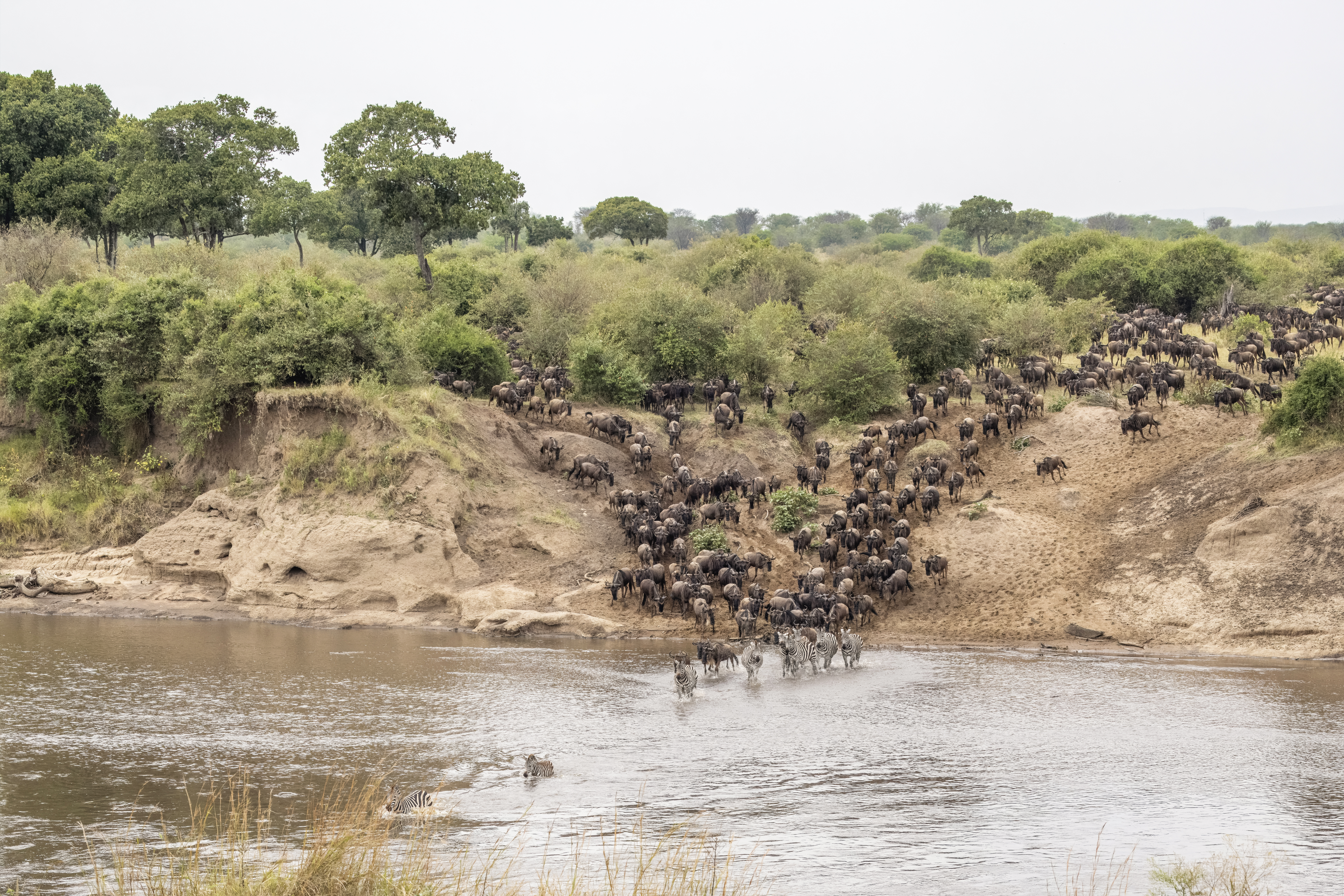
The wildebeest quickly follow the zebras into the river.

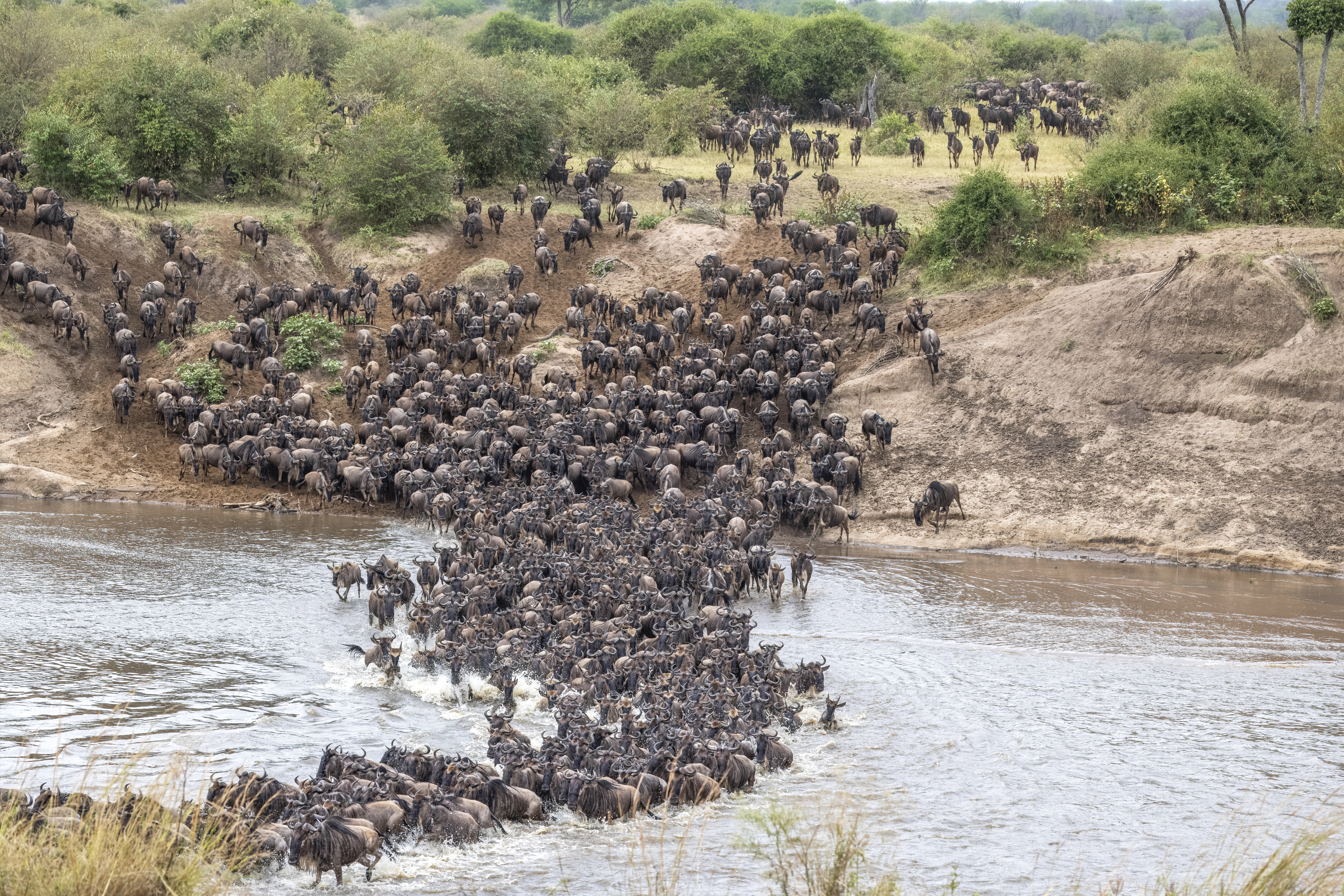
About 3000 wildebest make the crossing.

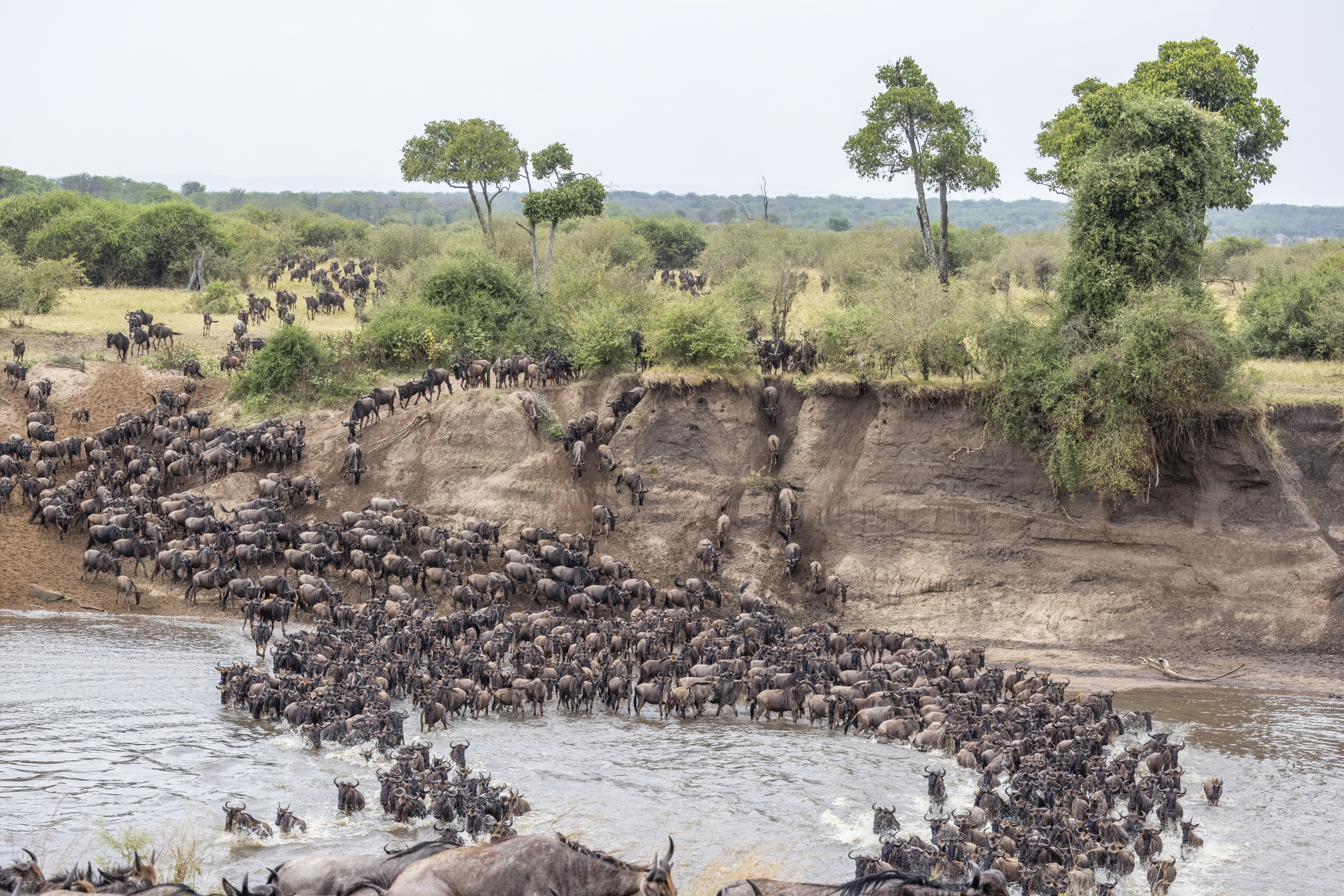
The herd splits into two groups and wildebeest start to descend the cliffs.

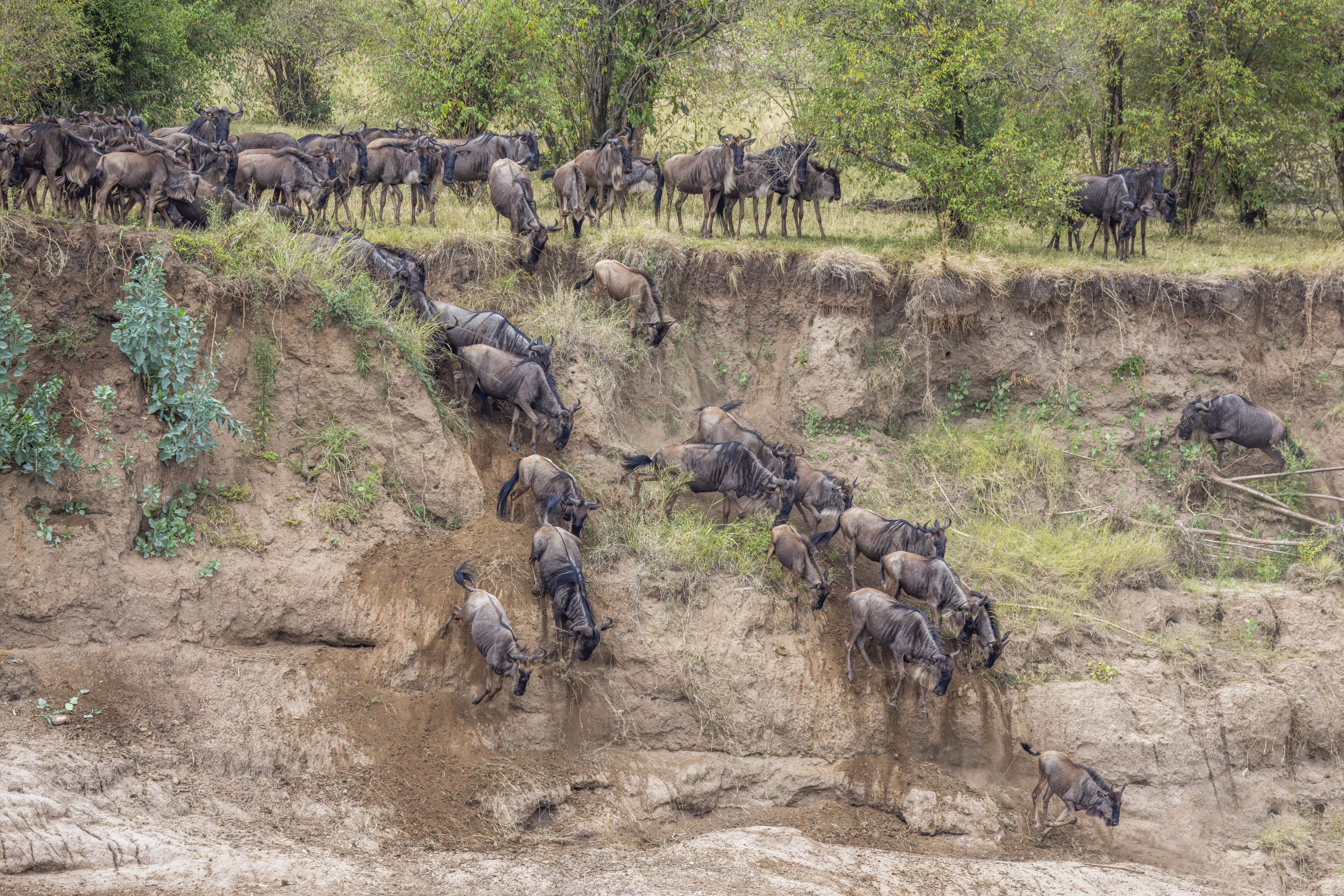
The wildebeest rush down the steep cliff to reach the water.

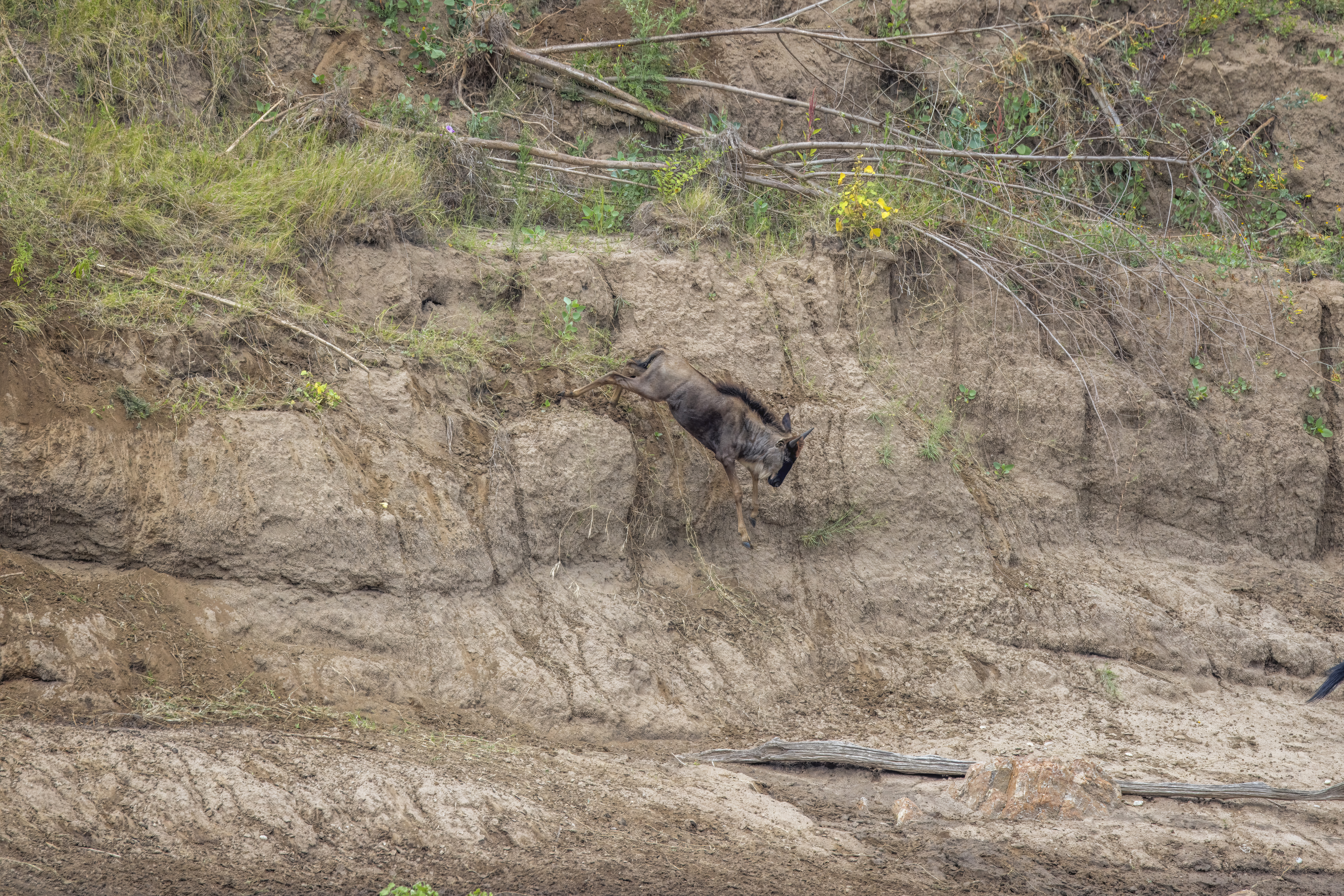
One of the last wildebeest jumps down the cliff.

=== Habitat ===
Its habitat is mostly made up of savanna, grassland, and some scattered dry forests. The western white-bearded wildebeest range is entirely within the tropics zone.
