= C-Boy =

Lion in Serengeti National Park, Tanzania

C-Boy by Michael Nichols, between 2011 and 2013

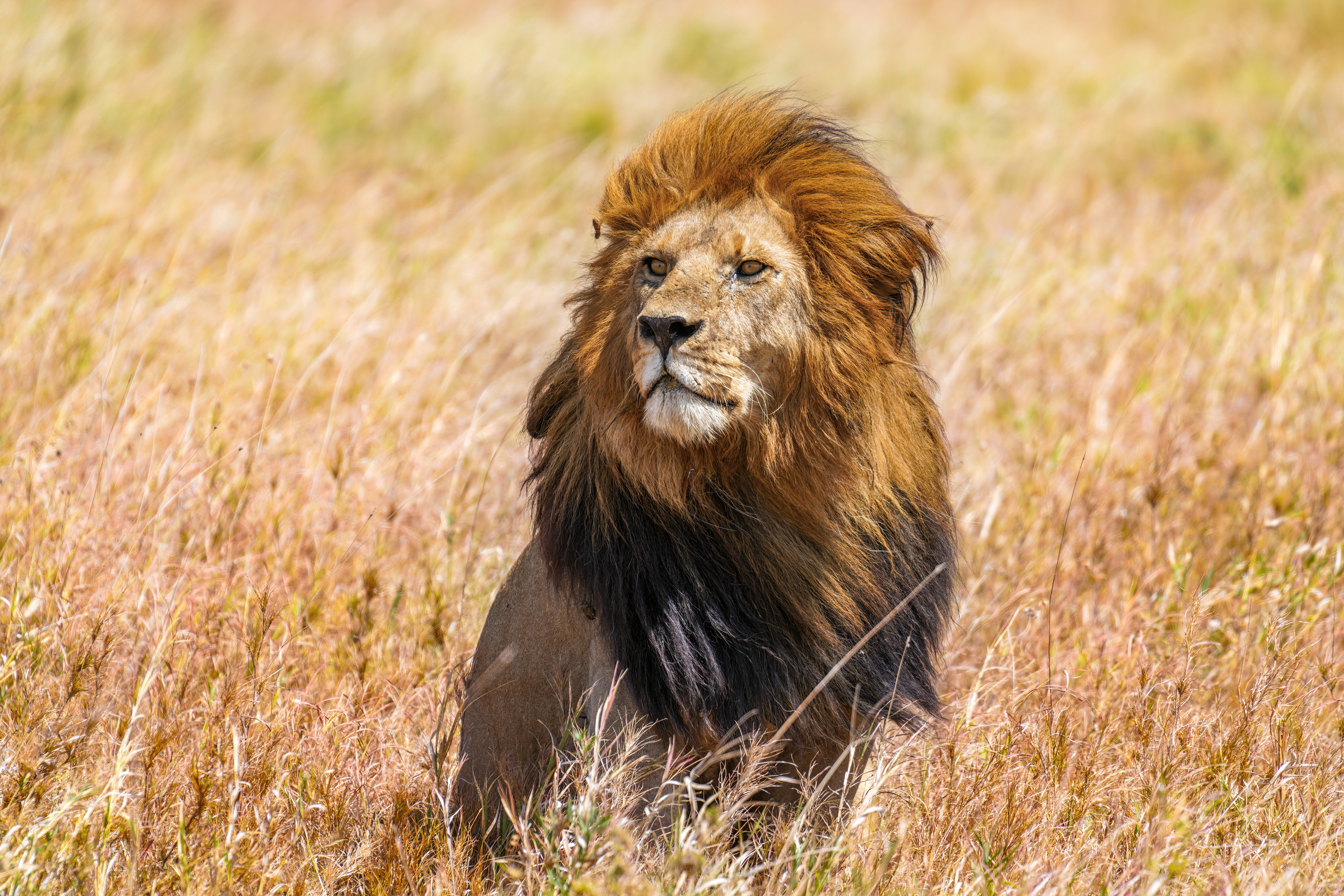
Wild lion (Panthera leo) Snyggve, son of C-Boy, scanning the horizon in the Serengeti National Park, Tanzania

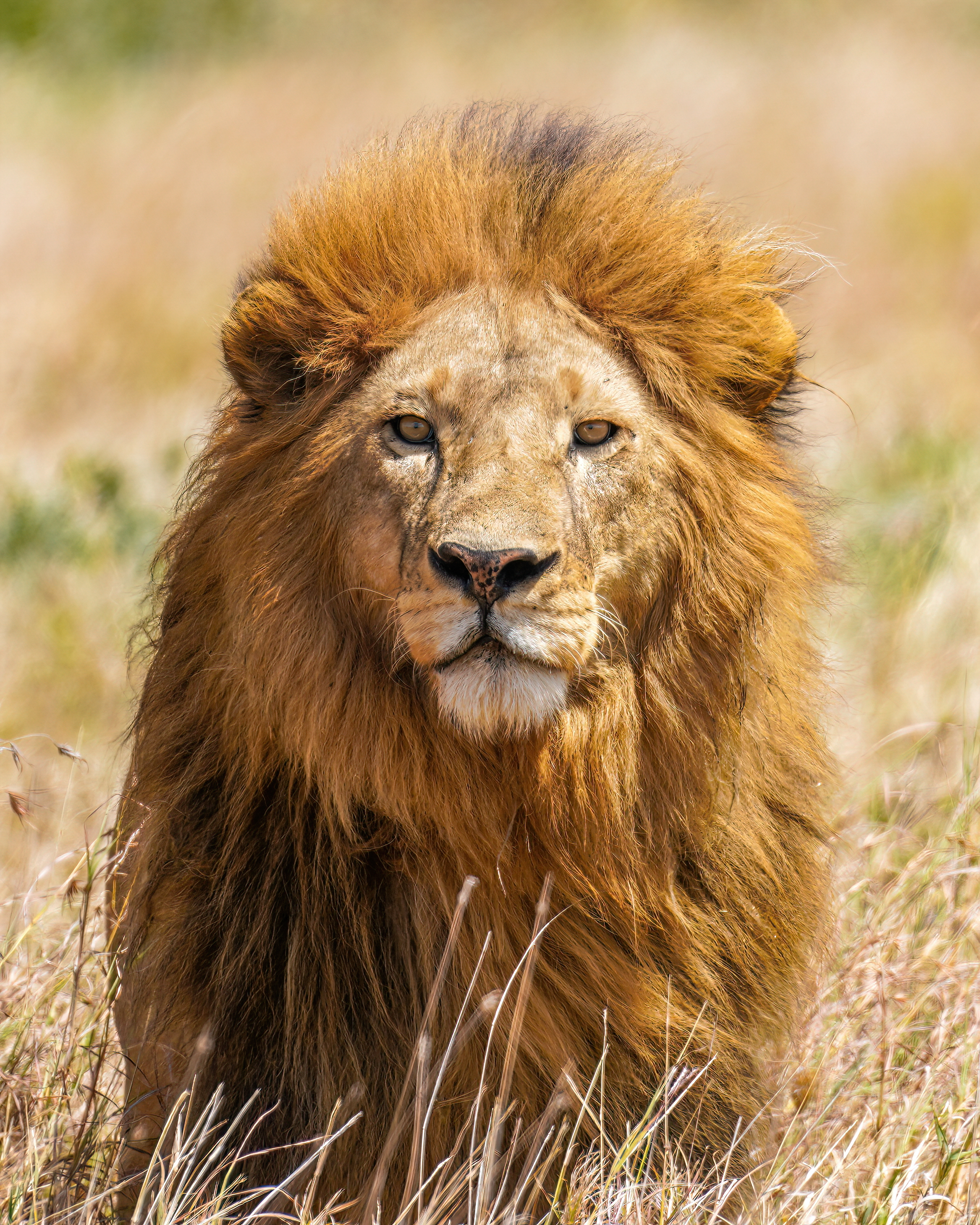
C-Boy's son Tryggve, in the Serengeti National Park, Tanzania

C-Boy (died June 2018, age ~14) was a lion in the Serengeti National Park, Tanzania. He is known for having survived an attack from a pack of three male lions, nicknamed "The Killers", in August 2009. He later nearly succumbed to infection after the attack. A decade later, C-Boy was found dead due to unknown causes. Photographer Nick Nichols took pictures of him during visits to the Serengeti between 2011 and 2013.

C-Boy is the father of two famous lions, Snyggve and Tryggve. Snyggve died in March 2023 after ruling the Namiri Plains with his brother for seven years.
