= Grumeti Game Reserve =

Tanzanian wildlife park

Coordinates: 2.020572°S 34.21100°E

- Area: 411.89 km^{2} (159.03 sq mi)
- Designation: Game reserve
- Designated: 1993
- Governing body: Tanzania National Parks (TANAPA)

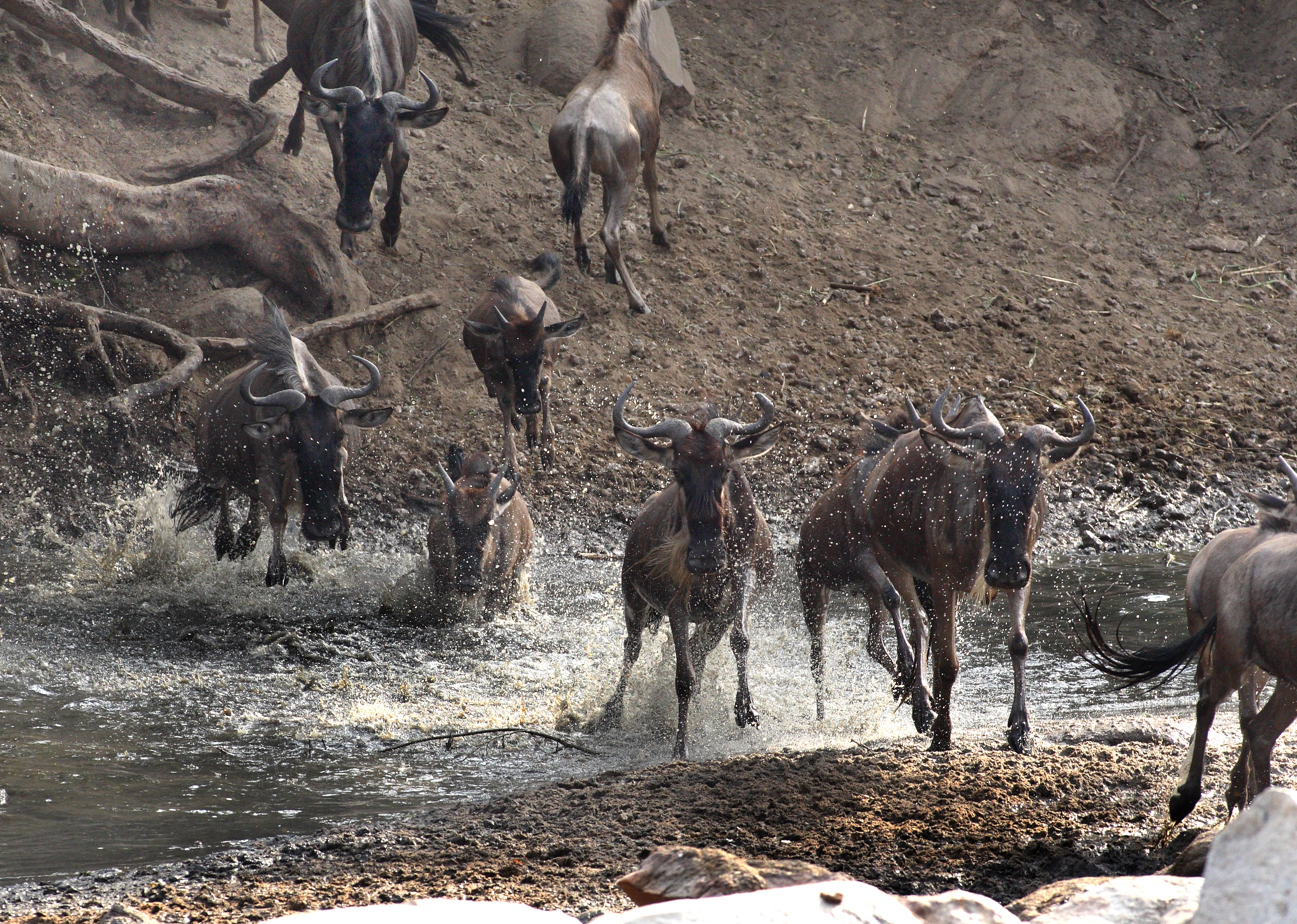

The Grumeti Game Reserve is found in Tanzania. It was established in 1993. The area measures around 412 km^{2} (159 sq mi).

On the northwestern border of the famous Serengeti National Park, there is the Grumeti Game Reserve: a migration corridor for herds of animals that naturally pass through the area.

This is where it is easy to see the movement of huge herds of wildebeest and zebra and this describes the Serengeti/Mara ecology itself.
