= Serengeti National Park =

National park in Tanzania

- Swahili: Hifadhi ya Serengeti
- IUCN category II (national park)
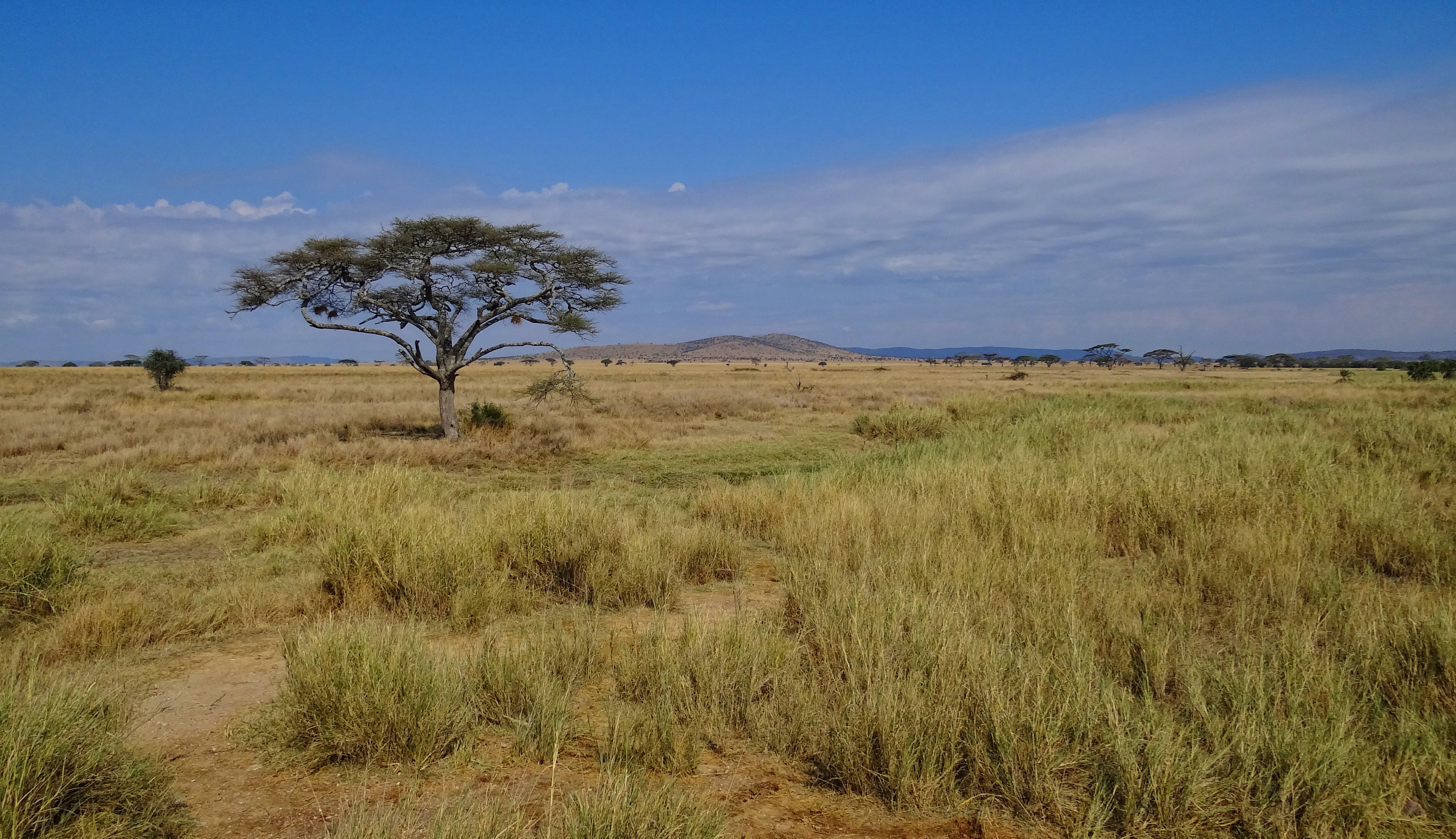
- Landscape in Serengeti National Park

- Location within Tanzania Location within Africa
- Location: Tanzania
- Coordinates: 2°24′S 34°36′E
- Area: 14,763 km^{2} (5,700 sq mi)
- Established: 1940
- Visitors: 350,000 per year
- Governing body: Tanzania National Parks Authority

UNESCO World Heritage Site
- Type: Natural
- Criteria: vii, x
- Designated: 1981 (5th session)
- Reference no.: 156
- Region: Africa

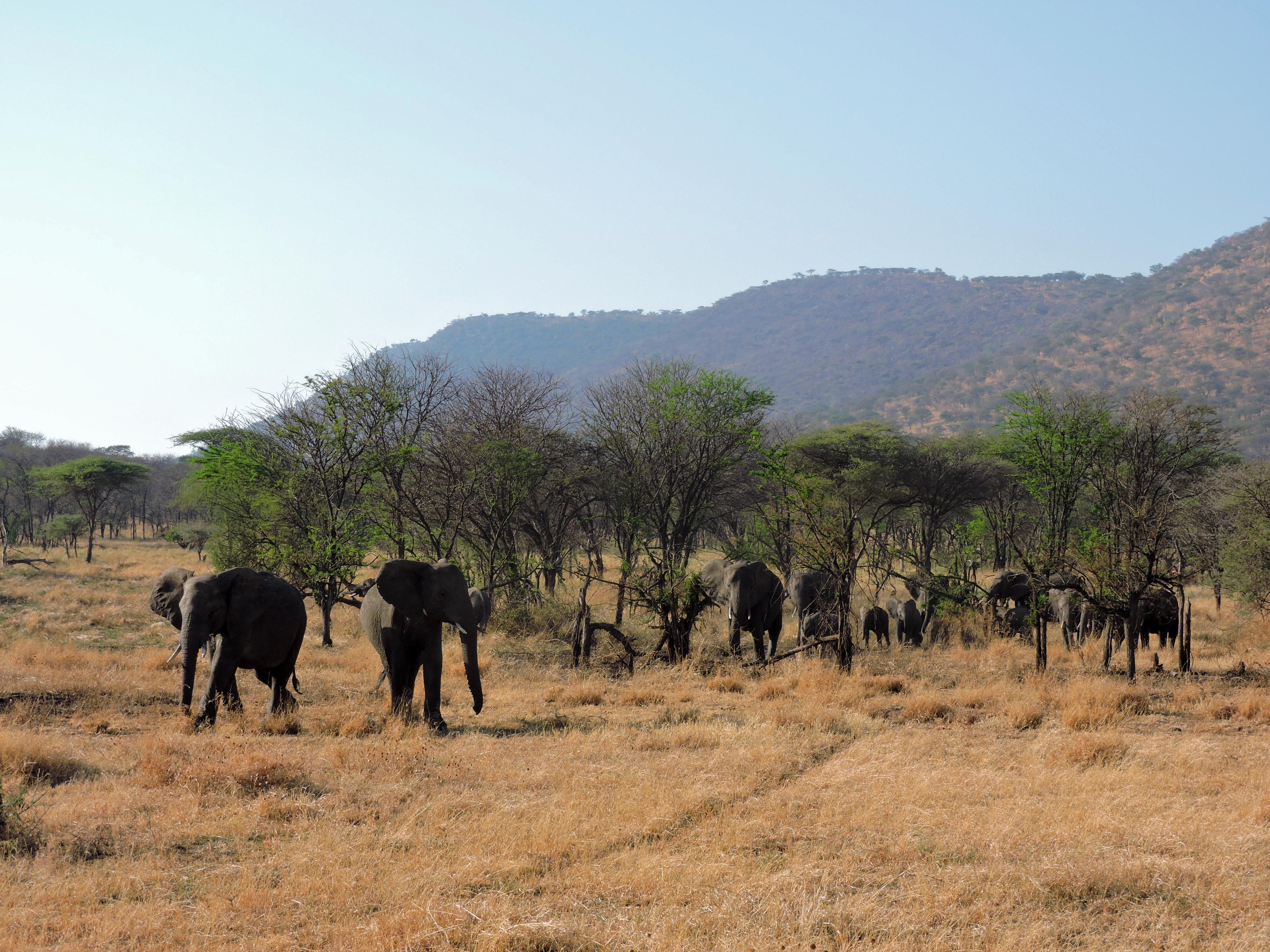
Elephants at Serengeti National Park

The Serengeti National Park is a large national park in northern Tanzania that stretches over 14,763 km^{2} (5,700 sq mi). It is located in eastern Mara Region and northeastern Simiyu Region and contains over 15,000 km^{2} (5,800 sq mi) of savanna. The park was established in 1940.

The Serengeti is known for the largest annual animal migration in the world of over 1.5 million western white-bearded wildebeest and 250,000 Grant's zebra, along with between 400-500,000 Thomson's gazelle and smaller herds of common eland. The national park is also home to the largest lion population in Africa. It is under threat from deforestation, population growth, poaching, and ranching.

== Etymology ==
The name "Serengeti" is often attributed to a Maasai word siringet, meaning "the place where the land runs on forever" or "endless plains". However, this word does not appear in dictionaries of the language.

== History ==
In 1930, Major Richard Hingston, visiting Tanganyika on a mission from the Society for the Preservation of the Fauna of the Empire (SPFE), proposed that the Serengeti Game Reserve be designated as a national park to ensure its protection from the pressures of population growth and economic development. The area became a national park in 1940. It was granted strict protection in 1948 when the Serengeti National Park Board of Trustees was formed to administer the national park. The government restricted the movements of the resident Maasai people, and the park boundaries were finalized in 1951. In 1959, an area of 8,300 km^{2} (3,200 sq mi) was split off in the eastern part of the national park and re-established as Ngorongoro Conservation Area in order to accommodate the traditional land use interests of the Maasai people in a multiple land use area.

In 1966, Serengeti Research Institute at Seronera was established to monitor and research the Great Migration. In 1981, the Serengeti National Park covered 12,950 km^{2} (5,000 sq mi), which was less than half of the Serengeti. The Serengeti gained fame after Bernhard Grzimek and his son Michael produced a book and documentary titled Serengeti Shall Not Die in 1959.

== Wildlife ==
Serengeti National Park forms a Lion Conservation Unit since 2005 together with Maasai Mara National Reserve. More than 3,000 lions live in this ecosystem. In 1994, an outbreak of canine distemper led to the deaths of approximately one-third of the lion population in the area.

The population density of the African leopard is estimated at 5.41 individuals per 100 km^{2} (14.0 per 100 sq miles) in the dry season.

African bush elephant herds recovered from a population low in the 1980s caused by poaching, and numbered over 5,000 individuals by 2014. The African buffalo population declined between 1976 and 1996 due to poaching, but increased to 28,524 individuals by 2008. The Eastern black rhinoceros population was reduced to about 10 individuals in the 1980s due to poaching, and fewer than 70 individuals survive in the park today. Rhinos mostly browse on grasses, woody Indigofera, Acacia and Crotalaria forbs and shrubs. An estimated 3,520 Masai giraffes lived in the park in 2010, down from 10,750 in 1977. The giraffe population stabilized in the centre of the protected area since 2010, but continued to decline in edge areas.

Other mammal carnivores include the cheetah, The African wild dog was returned to the area in 2012 after disappearing in 1991. Other mammals include hippopotamus, common warthog, aardvark, aardwolf, African wildcat, African civet, common genet, zorilla, African striped weasel, bat-eared fox, ground pangolin, crested porcupine, three species of hyraxes and Cape hare; rimates such as yellow and olive baboons, vervet monkey, and mantled guereza are also seen in the gallery forests of the Grumeti River.

More than 500 bird species can be seen such as Masai ostrich, secretarybird, kori bustards, helmeted guineafowls, grey-breasted spurfowl, blacksmith lapwing, African collared dove, red-billed buffalo weaver, southern ground hornbill, crowned cranes, sacred ibis, cattle egrets, black herons, knob-billed ducks, saddle-billed storks, white stork, goliath herons, marabou storks, yellow-billed stork, spotted thick-knees, lesser flamingo, shoebills, Abdim's stork, hamerkops, hadada ibis, African fish eagles, pink-backed pelicans, Tanzanian red-billed hornbill, martial eagles, Egyptian geese, lovebirds, spur-winged geese, oxpeckers, and many vulture species.

=== Great migration ===
The great migration is the world's second longest overland migration. The complete migration route is around 800 km (500 mi). South of this migration route covers the Ngorongoro Conservation Area where around half a million blue wildebeest are born between January and March. By March, at the beginning of the dry season, roughly 1.5 million wildebeest and 250,000 Plains zebras start to migrate north towards Maasai Mara in Kenya. Common eland, plains zebra, and Thomson's gazelle join the wildebeest. In April and May, the migrating herds pass through the Western Corridor. To get to the Maasai Mara, the herds have to cross the Grumeti and Mara Rivers, where around 3,000 Nile crocodiles lie in wait. For every wildebeest captured by the crocodiles, 50 drown. When the dry season ends in late October, the migrating herds start to head back south. Around 250,000 wildebeests and 30,000 plains zebras die annually from drowning, predation, exhaustion, thirst, or disease.

== Geology ==
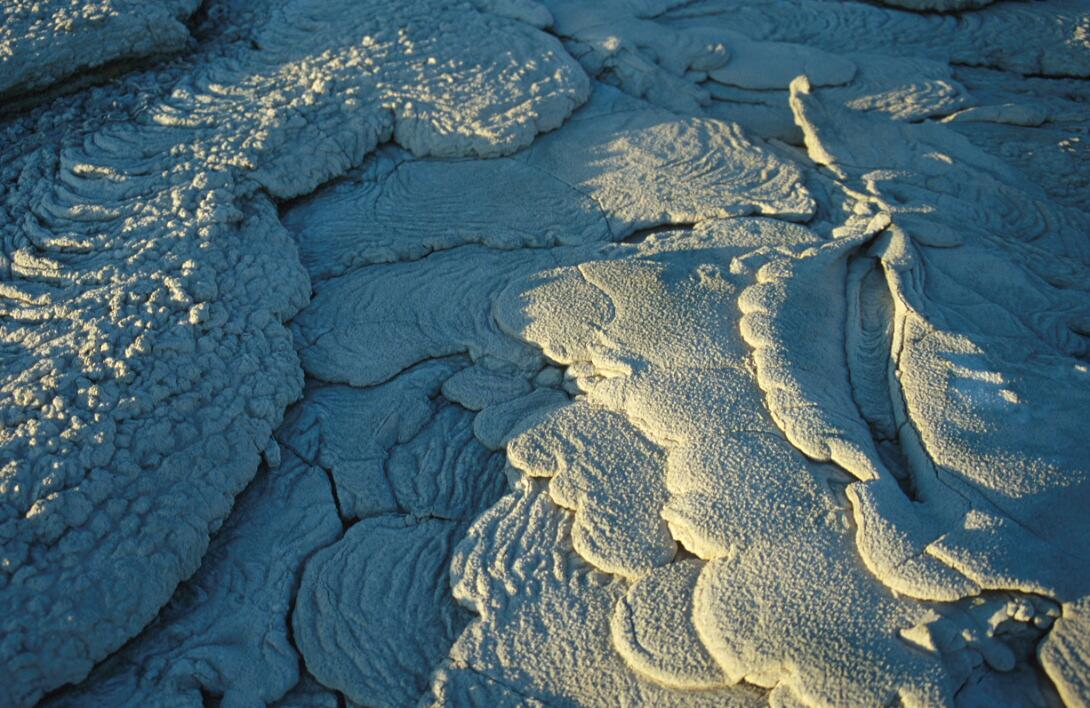
Carbonatite lava at Ol Doinyo Lengai volcano

The basement complex consists of Archaen Nyanzian System greenstones (2.81–2.63 Ga in age), Archaean granite-gneiss plutons (2.72–2.56 Ga in age), which were uplifted 180 Ma ago, forming koppies and elongated hills, the Neoproterozoic Mozambique Belt consisting of quartzite and granite, and the Neoproterozoic Ikorongo Group, consisting of sandstone, shale and siltstone that form linear ridges. The southeast portion of the park contains Neogene-aged volcanic rock and Oldoinyo Lengai Holocene-aged volcanic ash. The Grumeti, Mara, Mbalageti, and Orangi rivers flow westward to Lake Victoria, while the Oldupai River flows eastward into the Olbalbal Swamps.

In the eastern portion of the park lie the Serengeti volcanic grasslands which are a Tropical Grassland Ecozone. The grasslands grow on deposits of volcanic ash from the Kerimasi Volcano, which erupted 150,000 years ago, and also from the Ol Doinyo Lengai volcanic eruptions, which created layers of calcareous tuff and calcitic hard-pan soil (vertisols) from rapid weathering of the natrocarbonatite lava produced by the volcanoes.

== Geography ==
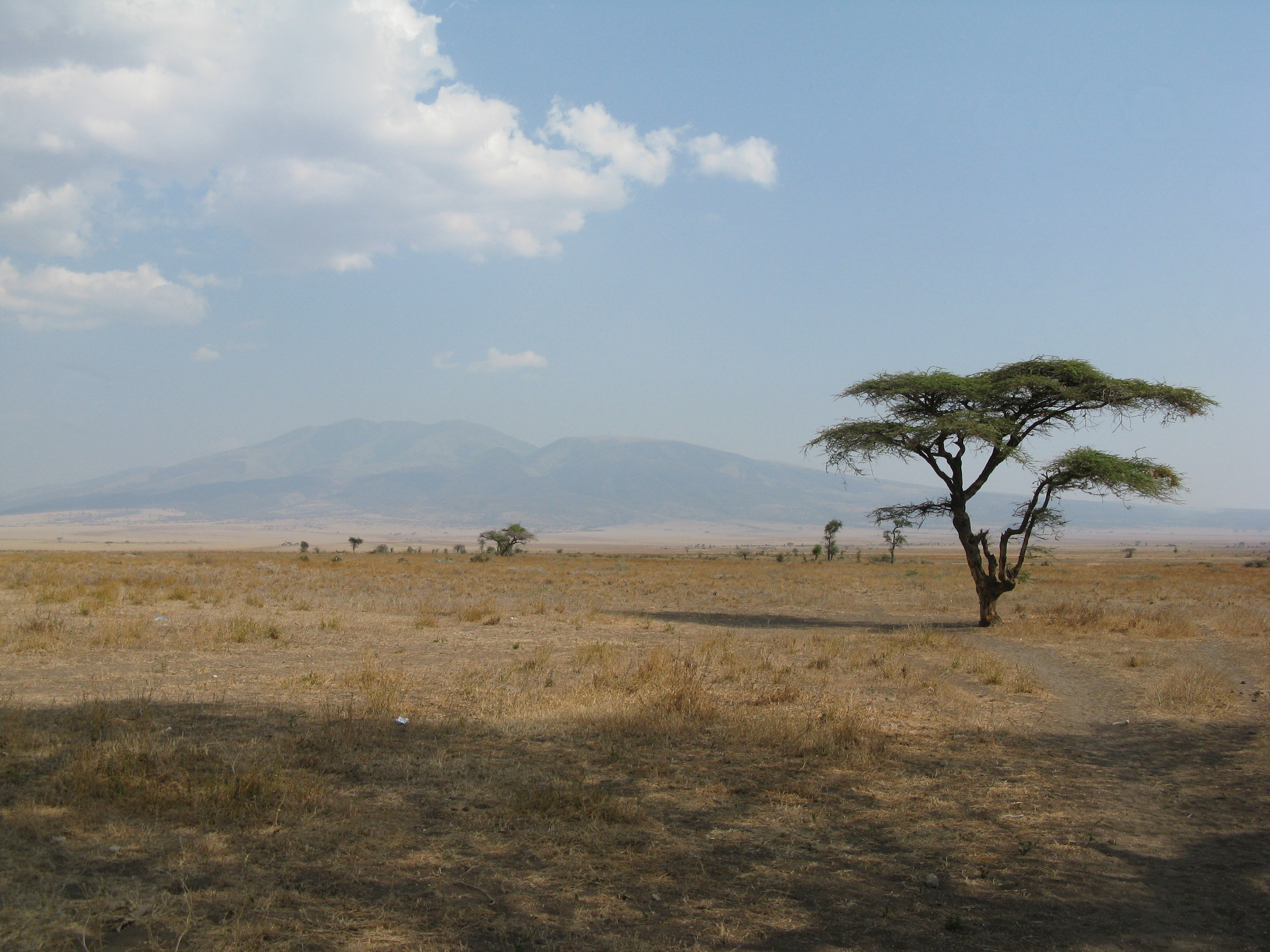
Serengeti Plains

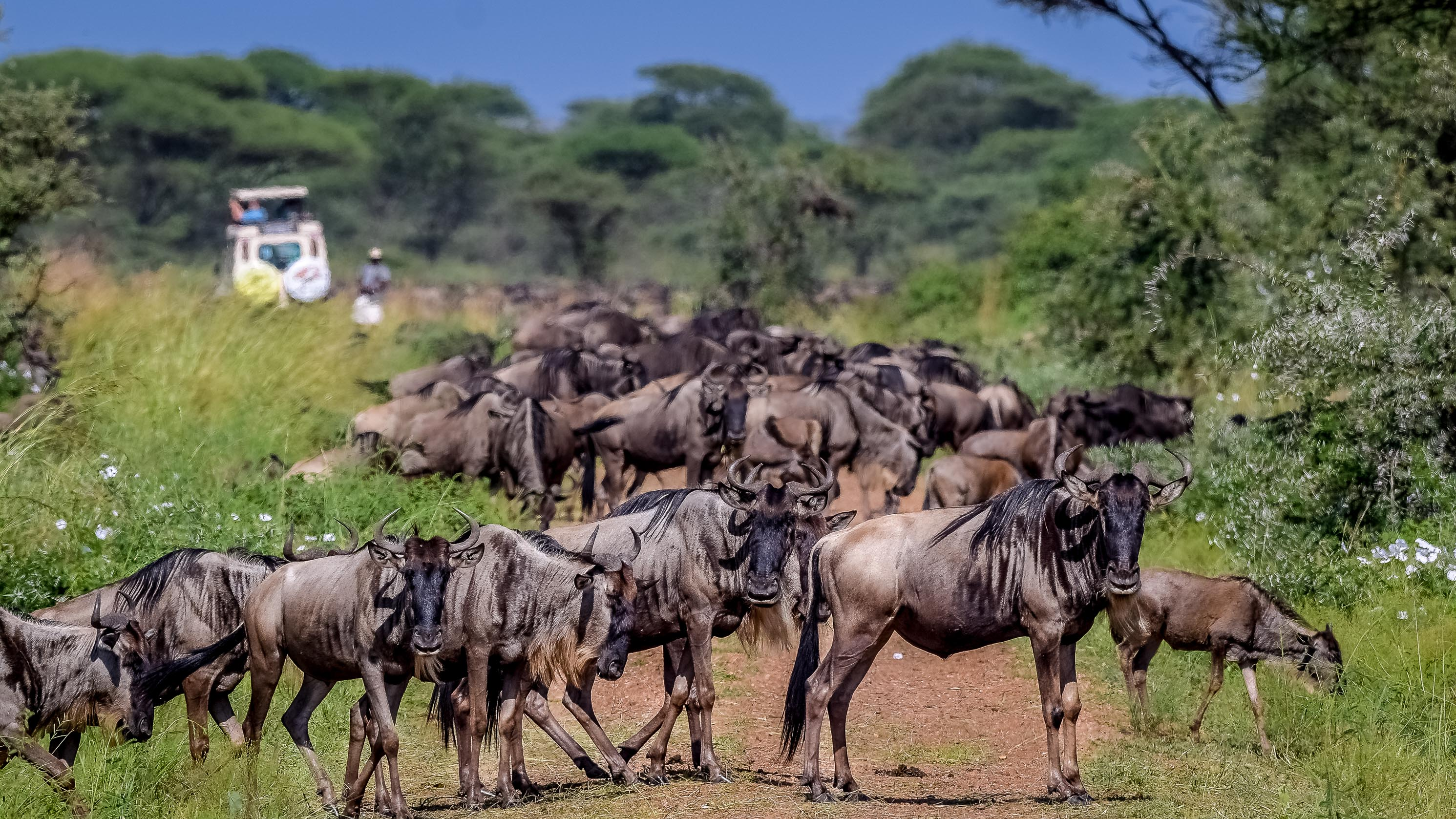
Wildebeest in the Western Corridor

The park covers 14,750 km^{2} (5,700 sq mi) of grassland plains, savanna, riverine forest, and woodlands. The park lies in northwestern Tanzania, bordered to the north by the Kenyan border, where it is continuous with the Maasai Mara National Reserve. To the southeast of the park is the Ngorongoro Conservation Area, to the southwest lies Maswa Game Reserve, to the west are the Ikorongo and Grumeti Game Reserves, and to the northeast and east lies the Loliondo Game Control Area.

The landscape of the Serengeti Plain is extremely varied, ranging from savannah to hilly woodlands to open grasslands. The region's geographic diversity is due to the extreme weather conditions that plague the area, particularly the potent combination of heat and wind. The diverse habitats in the region may have originated from a series of volcanoes, whose activity shaped the basic geographic features of the plain by adding mountains and craters to the landscape.

The Mara River, which flows through Maasai Mara National Reserve from the Kenyan highlands to Lake Victoria, is the only permanently-flowing river in the Serengeti ecosystem.

The park is divided into three regions:

- Serengeti plains: The best-known feature of the Serengeti is the almost treeless grassland in the south. It has koppies, granite formations that serve as observation posts for predators. The Volcanic Grasslands is an edaphic plant community that grows on soils derived from volcanic ash from nearby volcanoes.
- Western corridor: The main geographic feature is the pair of rivers, Grumeti and Mbalageti. There are big groups of riverine forest and some small mountain ranges. The great migration passes through the corridor from May to July. It stretches to Lake Victoria. The area is flatter than the northern parts of the park and more densely covered with plants than the southern plains.
- Northern Serengeti: The landscape is dominated by open woodlands, predominantly Commiphora and hills, ranging from Seronera in the south to the Mara River on the Kenyan border. It is remote and relatively inaccessible.

Human habitation is forbidden in the park except for the Tanzania National Parks Authority staff, researchers and staff of the various lodges, campsites, and hotels. The main settlement is Seronera with its primary Seronera airstrip.

== Administration and protection ==
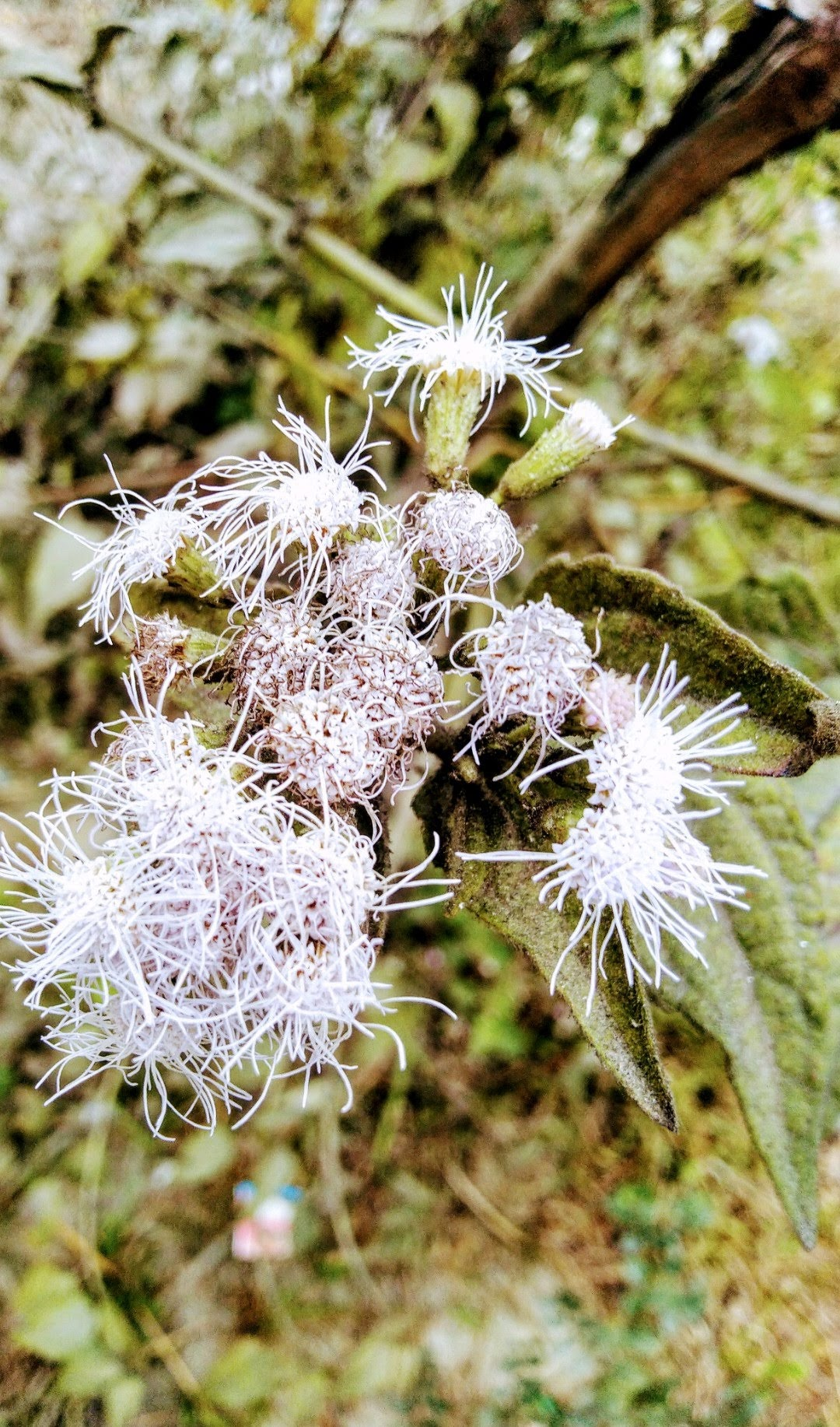
Siam weed, an introduced invasive species

The park is listed by the United Nations Educational, Scientific and Cultural Organization as a World Heritage Site. It is designated as a Category II protected area under the system developed by the International Union for Conservation of Nature, which means that it should be managed to protect the ecosystem or ecological processes.

The administrative body for all parks in Tanzania is the Tanzania National Parks Authority. Myles Turner was one of the park's first game wardens and is credited with bringing its rampant poaching under control.

== Threats ==
Deforestation in the Mau Forest region has changed the hydrology of the Mara River. There are invasive plant species such as Siam weed, Prickly pear, Feverfew and Mexican sunflower. A study in 1996 estimated that the human population of the western side of the park is growing by four percent yearly. Livestock use has also grown which has increased the amount of land turned over to farming and ranching. A study by the World Conservation Monitoring Centre in 2001 estimated that roughly 200,000 animals are killed by poaching every year.

Between 2005 and 2012, the government considered building a 452-km (281-mile) highway through the park, a proposal revived in 2024. The idea sparked significant controversy. Advocates argued that the road would improve connectivity and alleviate poverty in northern Tanzania, while conservationists warn of severe ecological impacts, including disruption of the wildebeest migration and potential ecosystem collapse. Alternatives, such as southern routes bypassing the park, have been proposed as less harmful options that could benefit more people while preserving the park's integrity.

== Tourism ==
The Serengeti offers good weather for safaris almost all year round. The best time is the dry season from June to October.

Serengeti National Park is one of the most visited national parks in Tanzania. According to the Tanzanian Ministry of Tourism, visitor numbers are as follows:

Year	Visitors
2018	270,946
2019	278,257
2020	69,605
2021	100,850
2022	230,289
2023	300,727

== See also ==
- Serengeti Symphony, a 1998 Dutch nature documentary
- C-Boy, famous lion that formerly resided in the park
