= Serengeti =

Geographical region in Tanzania

Coordinates: 2°19′51″S 34°50′0″E

Map of Tanzania showing the country's national parks, including the Serengeti National Park

The Serengeti (/ˌsɛrənˈɡɛti/ SERR-ən-GHET-ee) is a geographical region in Africa, spanning the Mara and Arusha Regions of Tanzania and extending to southwestern Kenya. The protected area within the region includes approximately 30,000 km^{2} (12,000 sq mi) of land, including the Serengeti National Park and several game reserves. The Serengeti hosts one of the world's largest land animal migration (in terms of total body weight), which helps secure it as one of the Seven Natural Wonders of Africa.

The Serengeti is also renowned for its large lion population and is one of the best places to observe prides in their natural environment. Approximately 70 large mammal and 500 bird species are found there. This high diversity is a function of diverse habitats, including riverine forests, swamps, kopjes, grasslands, and woodlands. Blue wildebeest, gazelles, zebras, and buffalos are some of the commonly found large mammals in the region. The Serengeti also contains the Serengeti District of Tanzania.

The name "Serengeti" is often said to be derived from the word "seringit" in Maa, meaning "endless plains". However, this etymology does not appear in Maa dictionaries.

== History ==
For eons, African wildlife have roamed freely across the vast rolling plains of the Serengeti, which was sparsely inhabited by humans. This changed when nomadic pastoralists of the Maasai began to migrate to the area in the early 1800s.

The Maasai, however, were struck by drought and disease. Thousands died in the 1880s from a cholera epidemic and in 1892 from smallpox. Making matters worse, their cattle were wiped out by Rinderpest (a bovine viral disease). Later in the 20th century the Tanzanian government re-settled the Maasai around the Ngorongoro Crater. Poaching, and the absence of fires (which had been caused by humans), allowed dense woodlands and thickets to develop over the next 30–50 years. Tsetse fly populations now prevented any significant human settlement in the area.

By the mid-1970s, wildebeest and Cape buffalo populations had recovered and were increasingly cropping the grass, reducing the amount of fuel available for fires. The reduced intensity of fires has allowed acacia to once again become established.

In the 21st century, mass rabies vaccination programmes for domestic dogs in the Serengeti have not only indirectly prevented hundreds of human deaths, but also protected wildlife species such as the endangered African wild dog.

== Great migration ==
Each year around the same time, the circular great wildebeest migration begins in the Ngorongoro Conservation Area of the southern Serengeti in Tanzania and loops clockwise through the Serengeti National Park and north towards the Maasai Mara reserve in Kenya. This migration is naturally caused by the availability of grazing. The initial phase lasts from about January to March, when the calving season begins – a time when there is plenty of rain-ripened grass available for the 260,000 zebras that precede 1.7 million wildebeest and the following hundreds of thousands of other plains game, including around 470,000 gazelles.

During February, the wildebeest are on the short grass plains of the southeast part of the ecosystem, grazing and giving birth to approximately 500,000 calves in 2 to 3 weeks. Few calves are born ahead of time and of these, hardly any survive, largely because very young calves are more noticeable to predators when mixed with older calves from the previous year. As the rains end in May, the animals start moving northwest into the areas around the Grumeti River, where they typically remain until late June. The crossings of the Grumeti and Mara rivers beginning in July are a popular safari attraction because crocodiles are lying in wait. The herds arrive in Kenya in late July / August, where they stay for the rest of the dry season, except that the Thomson's and Grant's gazelles move only east/west. In early November, with the start of the short rains, the migration starts moving south again, to the short grass plains of the southeast, usually arriving in December in plenty of time for calving in February.

A crossing of the Mara River in the Serengeti National Park in August

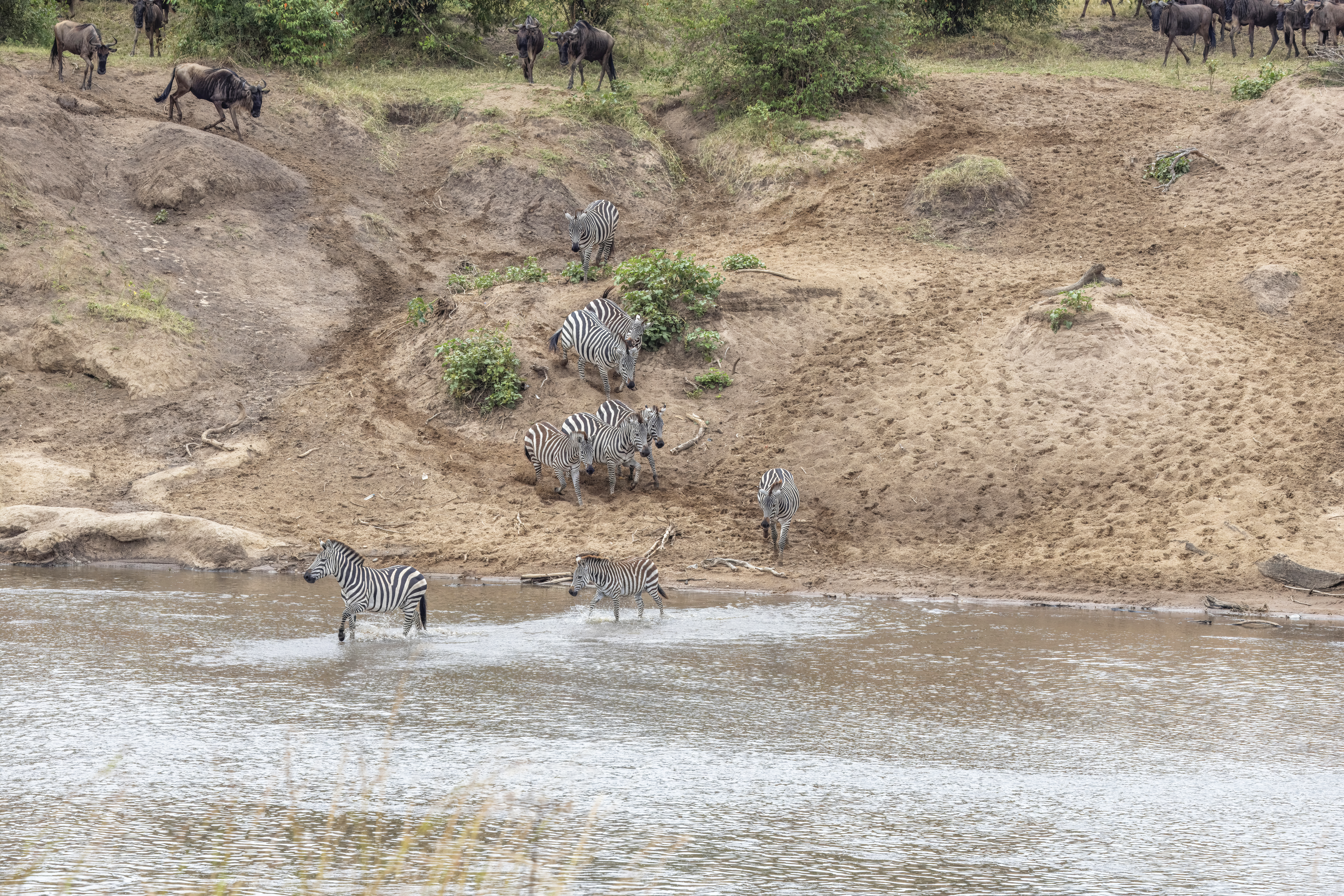
Zebras initiate the crossing.

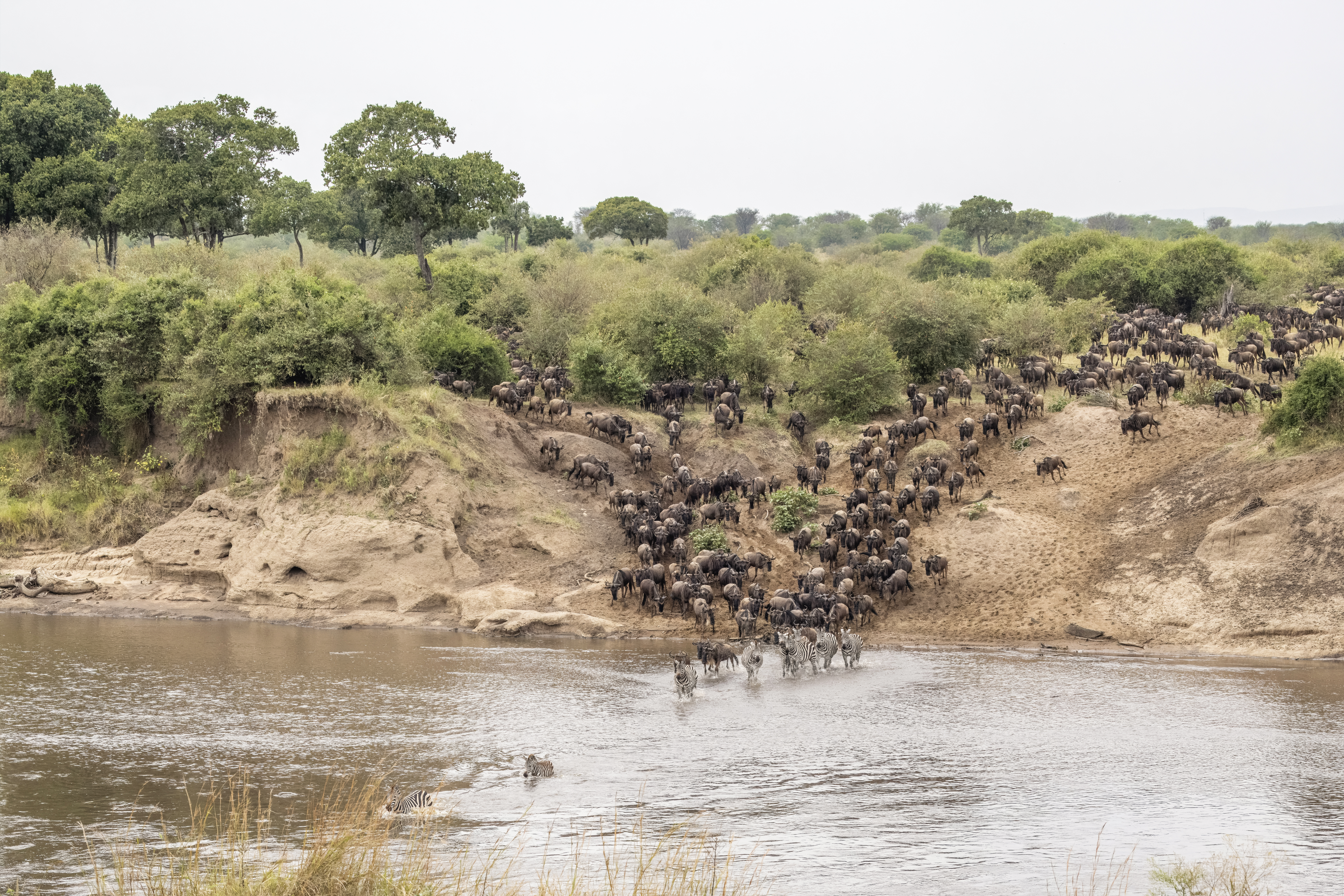
The wildebeest quickly follow the zebras into the river.

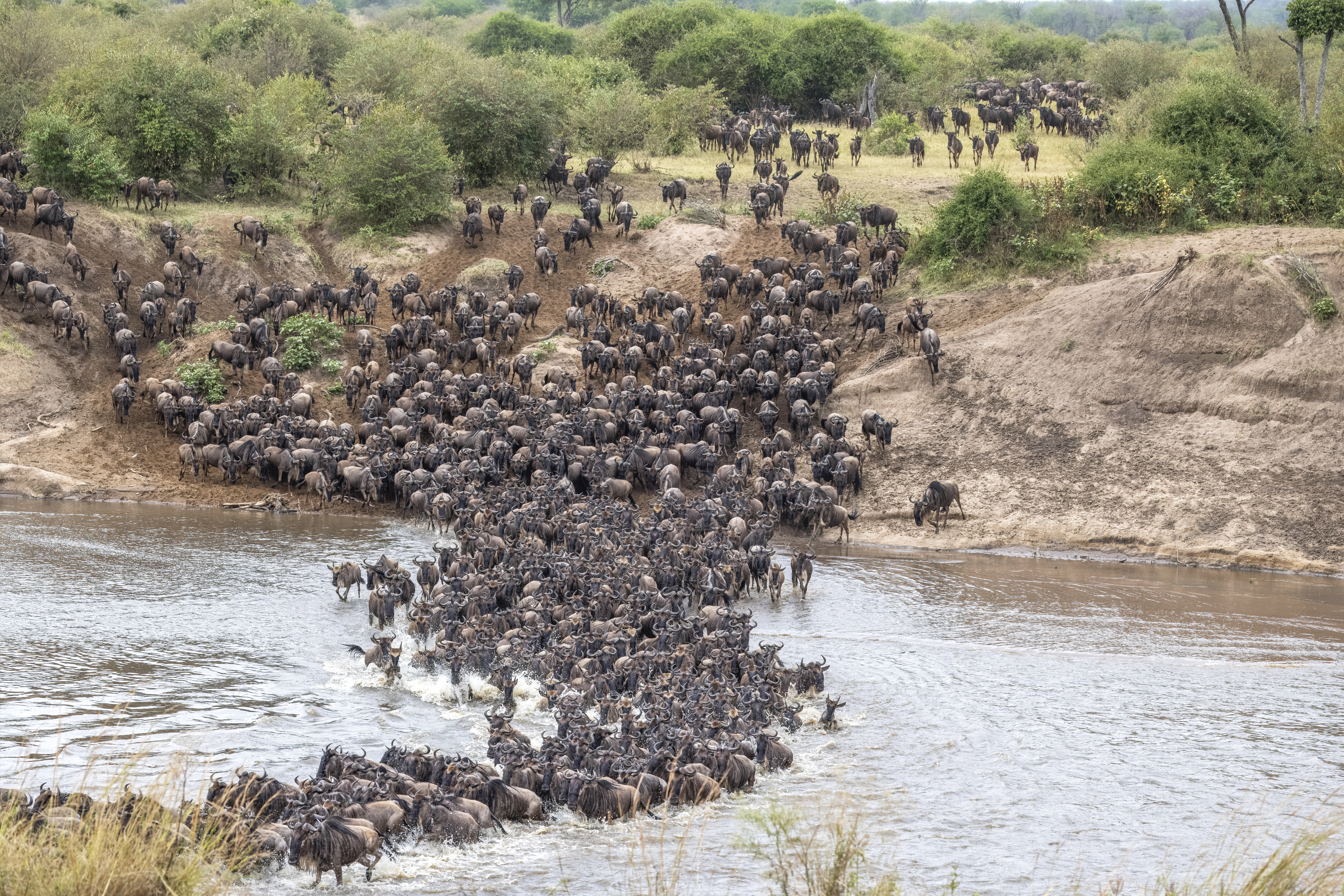
About 3000 wildebest make the crossing.

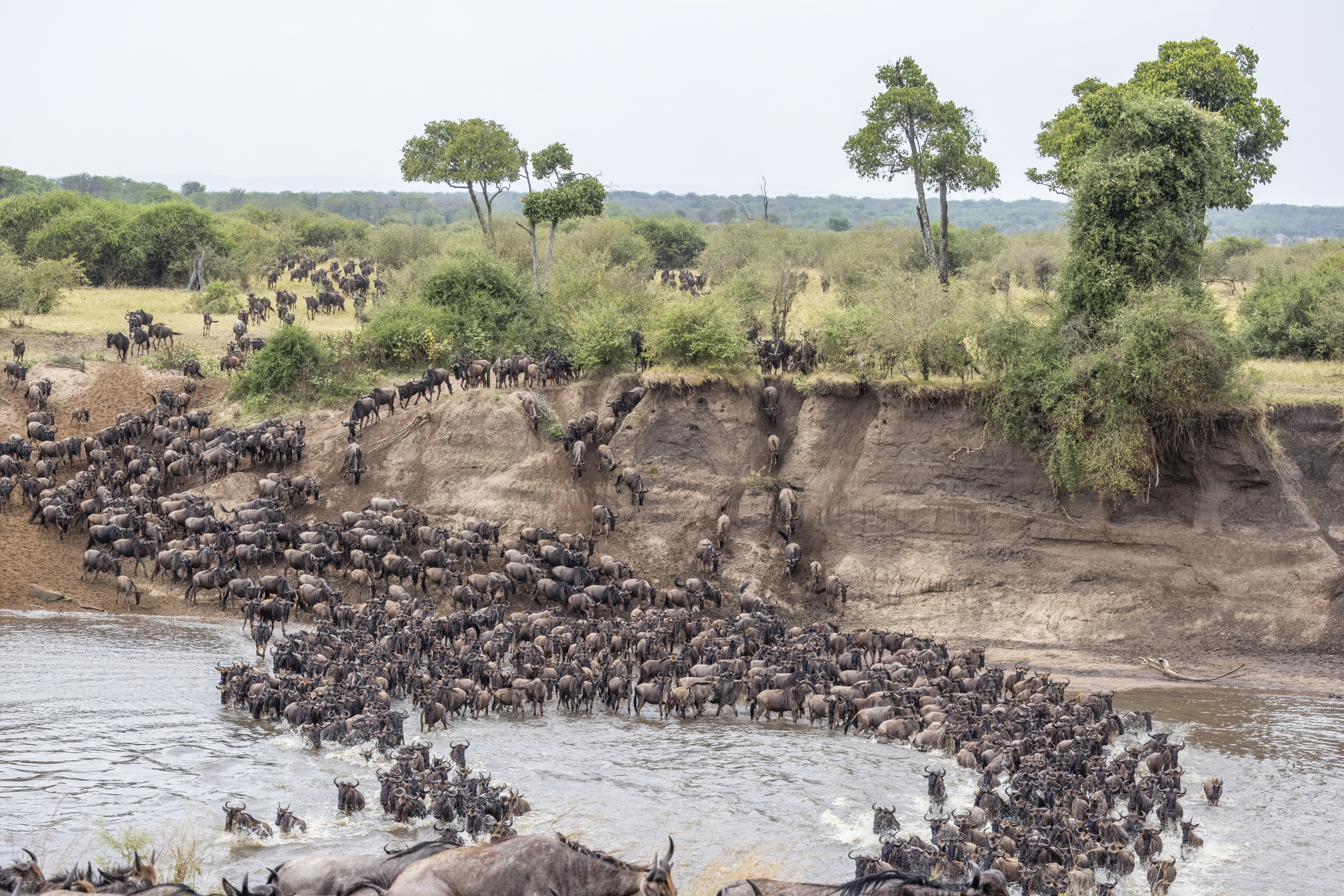
The herd splits into two groups and wildebeest start to descend the cliffs.

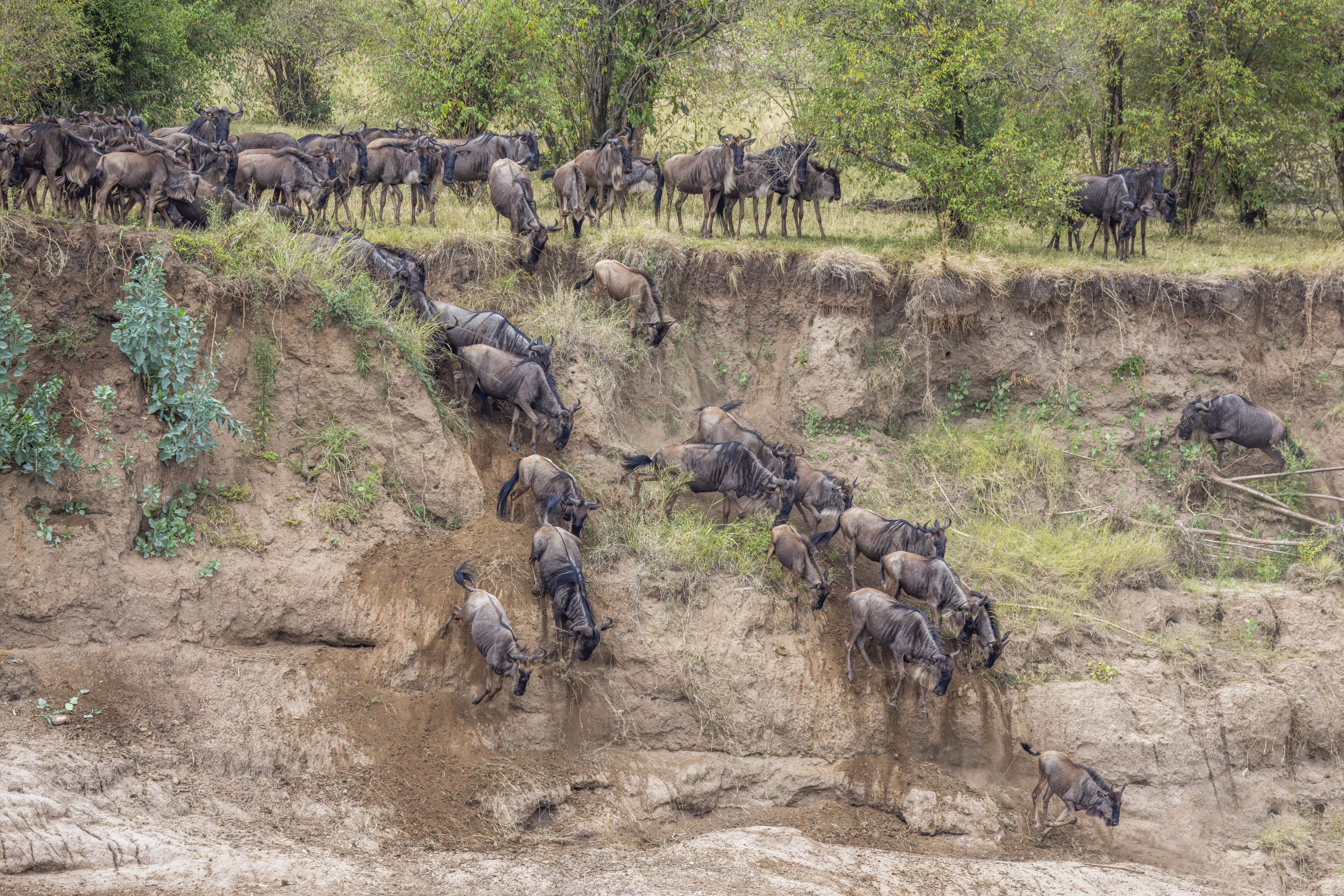
The wildebeest rush down the steep cliff to reach the water.

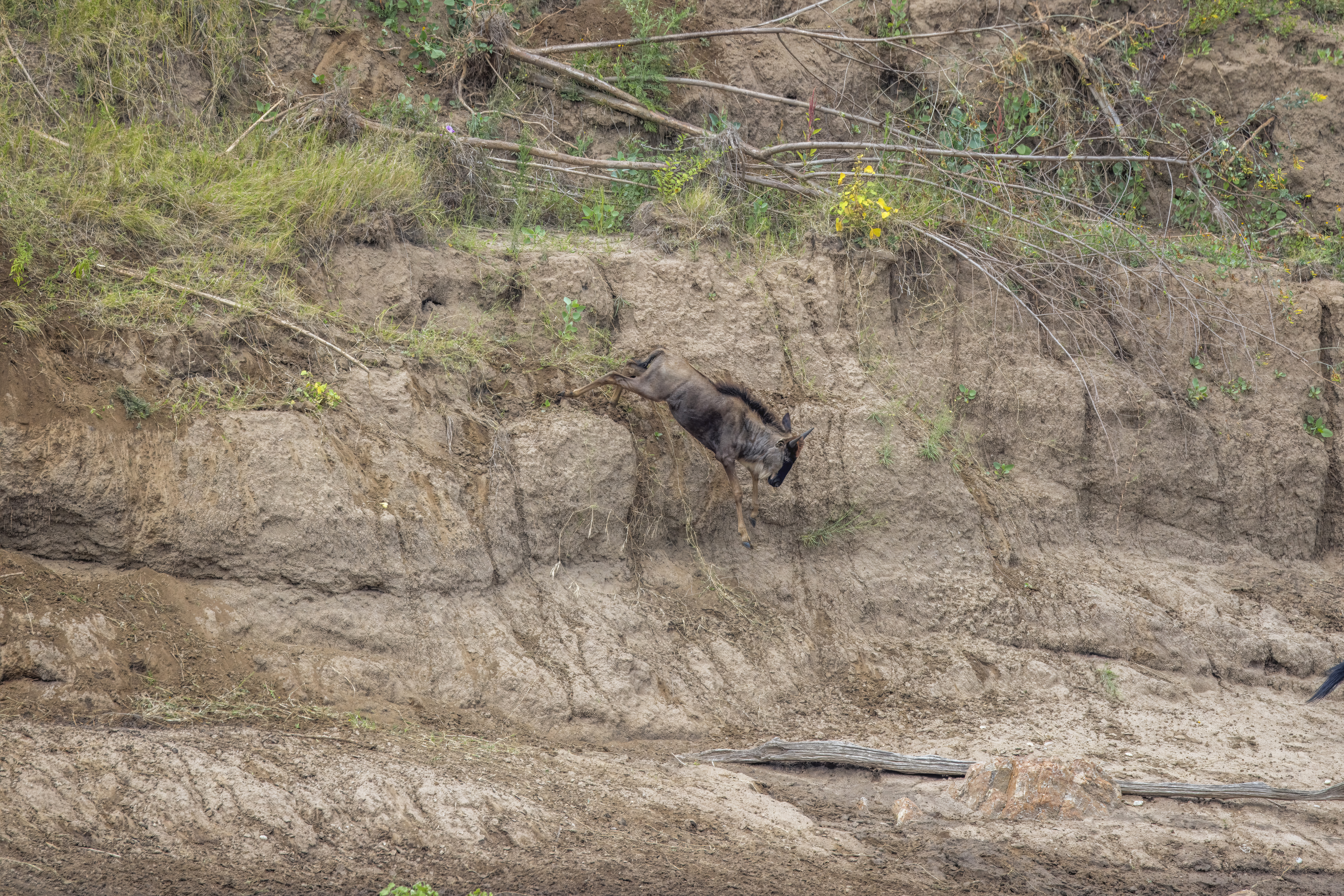
One of the last wildebeest jumps down the cliff.

About 250,000 wildebeests die during the journey from Tanzania to the Maasai Mara National Reserve in southwestern Kenya, of 800 kilometres (500 mi). Death is usually from thirst, hunger, exhaustion, or predation, including by big cats.

== Ecology ==
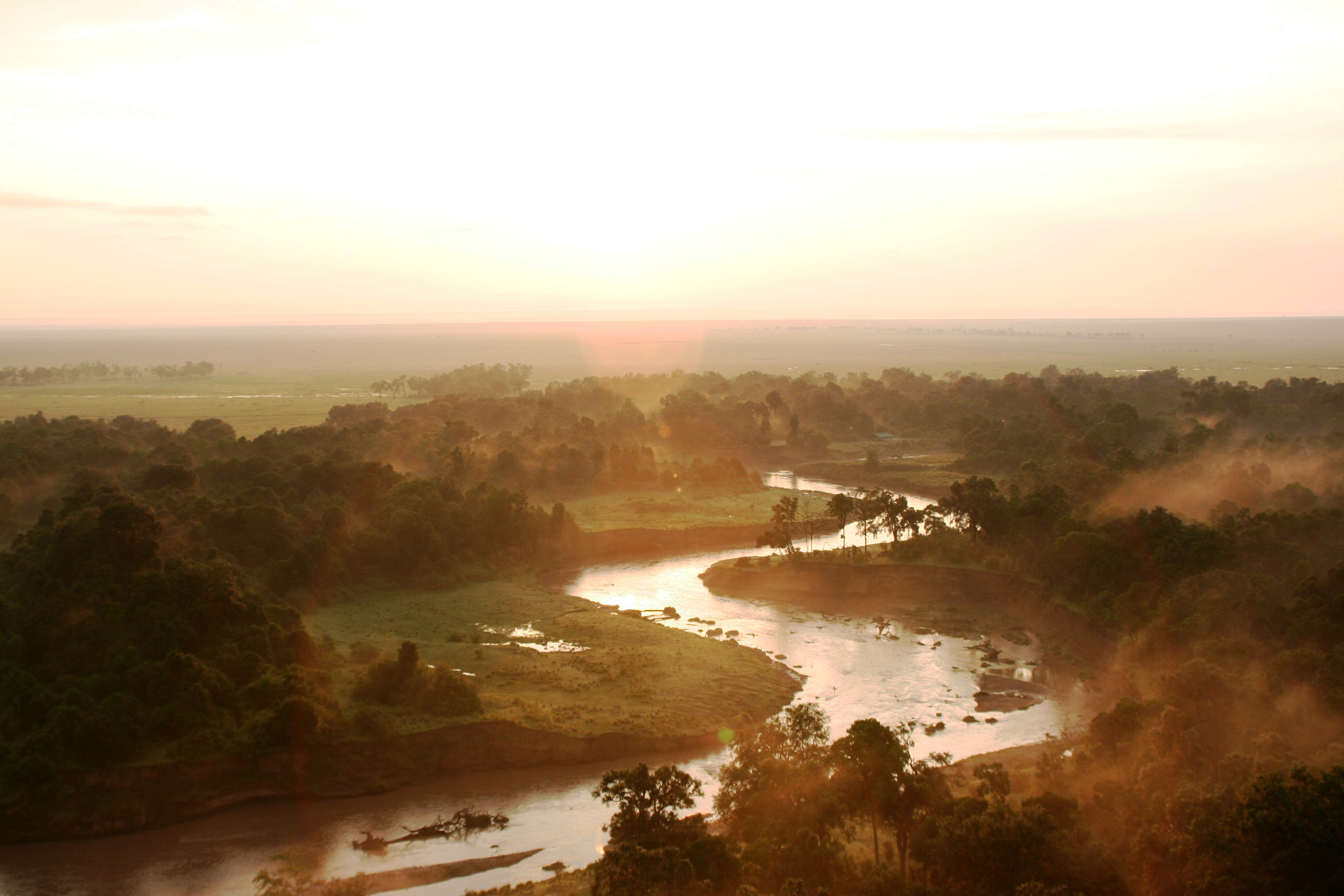
River and the Serengeti plains

The Serengeti has some of East Africa's finest wildlife areas. Besides being known for the great migration, the Serengeti is also famous for its abundant large predators. The ecosystem is home to over 3,000 lions, 1,000 African leopards, and 7,700 to 8,700 spotted hyenas (Crocuta crocuta). The East African cheetah is also present in Serengeti.

African wild dogs are relatively scarce in much of the Serengeti. This is particularly true in places such as Serengeti National Park (where they became extinct in 1992), in which lions and spotted hyenas, predators that steal wild dog kills and are a direct cause of wild dog mortality, are abundant.

The Serengeti is also home to a diversity of grazers, including Cape buffalo, African bush elephant, warthog, Grant's gazelle, eland, waterbuck, and topi. The Serengeti can support this remarkable variety of grazers only because each species, even those closely related, has a different diet. For example, wildebeests prefer to consume shorter grasses, while plains zebras prefer taller grasses. Similarly, dik-diks eat the lowest leaves of a tree, impalas eat the leaves that are higher up, and giraffes eat leaves that are even higher.

The governments of Tanzania and Kenya maintain a number of protected areas, including national parks, conservation areas, and game reserves, that give legal protection to over 80 per cent of the Serengeti. Despite this, the ecosystem is now just 60 per cent of its original size, due to human encroachment.

Near Lake Victoria, floodplains have developed from ancient lakebeds.

In the far northwest, acacia woodlands are replaced by broadleaved Terminalia-Combretum woodlands, caused by a change in geology. This area has the highest rainfall in the system and forms a refuge for the migrating ungulates at the end of the dry season.

Altitudes in the Serengeti range from 920 to 1,850 metres (3,020 to 6,070 ft) with mean temperatures varying from 15 to 25 °C (59 to 77 °F). Although the climate is usually warm and dry, rainfall occurs in two rainy seasons: March to May, and a shorter season in October and November. Rainfall amounts vary from a low of 508 millimetres (20 in) in the lee of the Ngorongoro highlands to a high of 1,200 millimetres (47 in) on the shores of Lake Victoria.

The area is also home to the Ngorongoro Conservation Area, which contains Ngorongoro Crater and the Olduvai Gorge, where some of the oldest hominin fossils have been found.

== In media ==
- In 1993, soft rock artist Dan Fogelberg recorded a song titled "Serengeti Moon" for his studio album River of Souls. It is an African-themed love song about a couple making love underneath the Serengeti moon.
- Canadian guitarist Sonny Greenwich recorded a song titled "Serengeti" on his 1994 album Hymn to the Earth with vocals by Ernie Nelson.
- Serengeti, a six-episode BBC series, chronicles the life of some of the animals in the Serengeti.
- The 1982 song "Africa" by the American rock band Toto, originally released on their album Toto IV, includes a reference to the Serengeti. The song inaccurately describes Mount Kilimanjaro as "ris(ing) like Olympus above the Serengeti"; Kilimanjaro is actually located hundreds of miles to the east of the Serengeti.
- The American rock band the Grateful Dead included the track "Serengetti", an instrumental dual drum solo, on their 1978 album Shakedown Street, interrupting the disco and soft rock-inspired sound with a tribal jam.

== See also ==
- List of topics related to Africa
- Maasai mythology
