= List of state leaders in the 20th century (1951–2000) =

Lists of state leaders by century
- List of state leaders in the 19th century (1851–1900)
- List of state leaders in the 20th century (1901–1950)
- List of state leaders in the 2000s
- List of state leaders in the 2010s

This is a list of state leaders in the 20th century (1951–2000) AD, such as the heads of state, heads of government, and the general secretaries of single-party states.

These polities are generally sovereign states, including states with limited recognition (when recognised by at least one UN member state), but excludes minor dependent territories, whose leaders can be found listed under territorial governors in the 20th century. For completeness, these lists can include colonies, protectorates, or other dependent territories that have since gained sovereignty.

== Africa ==
=== Africa: Central ===
Angola

- Portuguese Angola (complete list) –

Colony, 1575–1951; Overseas province, 1951–1975
For details see the Kingdom of Portugal under Southwest Europe

- Democratic People's Republic of Angola (complete list) –

- Presidents (complete list) –

- Holden Roberto, President (1975–1976)
- Jonas Savimbi, President (1975–1976, 1979–2002)

- Prime ministers (complete list) –

- José Ndele, Johnny Eduardo Pinnock, joint Prime ministers (1975–1976)

- People's Republic of Angola

- Presidents (complete list) –

- Agostinho Neto, President (1975–1979)
- Lúcio Lara, Interim President (1979)
- José Eduardo dos Santos, President (1979–2017)

- Prime ministers (complete list) –

- Lopo do Nascimento, Prime minister (1975–1978)
- Fernando José de França Dias Van-Dúnem, Prime minister (1991–1992, 1996–1999, 2002–2008)

- Republic of Angola

- Presidents (complete list) –

- José Eduardo dos Santos, President (1979–2017)

- Prime ministers (complete list) –

- Marcolino Moco, Prime minister (1992–1996)
- Fernando José de França Dias Van-Dúnem, Prime minister (1991–1992, 1996–1999, 2002–2008)

- Republic of Cabinda –

- Henrique N'zita Tiago, Provisional government leader (1975)
- Luis Ranque Franque, President (1975–1976)

Cameroon

- French Cameroon, part of French Equatorial Africa (complete list) –

Annexed from German Kamerun, 1914–1919; League of Nations mandate, 1919–1946; United Nations trust territory, 1946–1960
For details see France under western Europe

- British Cameroons (complete list) –

Annexed from German Kamerun, 1914–1919; League of Nations mandate, 1919–1946; United Nations trust territory, 1946–1961
For details see the United Kingdom under British Isles, Europe

- Republic of Cameroon

- Presidents (complete list) –

- Ahmadou Ahidjo, President (1960–1982)
- Paul Biya, President (1982–present)

- Prime ministers (complete list) –

- Ahmadou Ahidjo, Prime minister (1958–1960)
- Charles Assalé, Prime minister (1960–1961)
East Cameroon
- Charles Assalé, Prime minister (1961–1965)
- Vincent de Paul Ahanda, Prime minister (1965)
- Simon Pierre Tchoungui, Prime minister (1965–1972)
West Cameroon
- John Ngu Foncha, Prime minister (1961–1965)
- Augustine Ngom Jua, Prime minister (1965–1968)
- Salomon Tandeng Muna, Prime minister (1968–1972)
United Cameroon
- Paul Biya, Prime minister (1972–1982)
- Bello Bouba Maigari, Prime minister (1982–1983)
- Luc Ayang, Prime minister (1983–1984)
- Sadou Hayatou, Prime minister (1991–1992)
- Simon Achidi Achu, Prime minister (1992–1996)
- Peter Mafany Musonge, Prime minister (1996–2004)

Central African Republic

- Ubangi-Shari part of French Equatorial Africa (complete list) –

French colony, 1903–1958
For details see France under western Europe

- Central African Republic

- Presidents (complete list) –

- David Dacko, President (1960–1966)
- Jean-Bédel Bokassa

- President (1966–1976)
- Emperor of the Central African Empire (1976–1979)

- David Dacko, President (1979–1981)
- André Kolingba, President (1981–1993)
- Ange-Félix Patassé, President (1993–2003)

- Prime ministers (complete list) –

- David Dacko, Prime minister (1959–1960)
- Elisabeth Domitien, Prime minister (1975–1976)
- Ange-Félix Patassé, Prime minister of the Central African Empire (1976–1978)
- Henri Maïdou, Prime minister of the Central African Empire (1978–1979)
- Bernard Ayandho, Prime minister (1979–1980)
- Jean-Pierre Lebouder, Prime minister (1980–1981)
- Simon Narcisse Bozanga, Prime minister (1981)
- Édouard Frank, Prime minister (1991–1992)
- Timothée Malendoma, Prime minister (1992–1993)
- Enoch Derant Lakoué, Prime minister (1993)
- Jean-Luc Mandaba, Prime minister (1993–1995)
- Gabriel Koyambounou, Prime minister (1995–1996)
- Jean-Paul Ngoupandé, Prime minister (1996–1997)
- Michel Gbezera-Bria, Prime minister (1997–1999)
- Anicet-Georges Dologuélé, Prime minister (1999–2001)

Chad

- French Chad, part of French Equatorial Africa (complete list) –

Colony, 1900–1960
For details see France under western Europe

- Republic of Chad

- Presidents (complete list) –

- François Tombalbaye, President (1960–1975)
- Noël Milarew Odingar, President (1975)
- Félix Malloum, President (1975–1979)
- Goukouni Oueddei, President (1979)
- Lol Mahamat Choua, President (1979)
- Goukouni Oueddei, President (1979–1982)
- Hissène Habré, President (1982–1990)
- Idriss Déby, President (1990–2021)

- Prime ministers (complete list) –

- Hissène Habré, Prime minister (1978–1979)
- Djidingar Dono Ngardoum, Prime minister (1982)
- Jean Alingué Bawoyeu, Prime minister (1991–1992)
- Joseph Yodoyman, Prime minister (1992–1993)
- Fidèle Moungar, Prime minister (1993)
- Delwa Kassiré Koumakoye, Prime minister (1993–1995)
- Koibla Djimasta, Prime minister (1995–1997)
- Nassour Guelendouksia Ouaido, Prime minister (1997–1999)
- Nagoum Yamassoum, Prime minister (1999–2002)

Congo, Democratic Republic of the

- Belgian Congo (complete list) –

Colony, 1908–1960
For details see the Belgium under Western Europe

- Republic of the Congo (Léopoldville)

- Presidents (complete list) –

- Joseph Kasa-Vubu, President (1960–1965)
- Antoine Gizenga, Rebel President (1961)
- Mobutu Sese Seko, President (1965–1971)

- Prime ministers (complete list) –

- Patrice Lumumba, Prime minister (1960)
- Joseph Iléo, Prime minister (1960)
- Justin Marie Bomboko, Prime minister (1960–1961)
- Joseph Iléo, Prime minister (1961)
- Antoine Gizenga, Rebel, Prime minister (1960–1961)
- Cyrille Adoula, Prime minister (1961–1964)
- Moise Tshombe, Prime minister (1964–1965)
- Évariste Kimba, Prime minister (1965)
- Léonard Mulamba, Prime minister (1965–1966)

- State of Katanga –

- Moïse Tshombe, President (1960–1963)

- South Kasai –

- Albert Kalonji, President (1960–1961), Mulopwe (1961–1962)

- Zaire

- Presidents (complete list) –

- Mobutu Sese Seko, President (1971–1997)

- Heads of government (complete list) –

- Mpinga Kasenda, Prime minister (1977–1979)
- Bo-Boliko Lokonga, Prime minister (1979–1980)
- Jean Nguza Karl-i-Bond, First state commissioner (1980–1981)
- N'Singa Udjuu, First state commissioner (1981–1982)
- Léon Kengo, First state commissioner (1982–1986)
- Mabi Mulumba, First state commissioner (1987–1988)
- Jules Fontaine Sambwa, First state commissioner (1988)
- Léon Kengo, First state commissioner (1988–1990)
- Lunda Bululu, Prime minister (1990–1991)
- Mulumba Lukoji, Prime minister (1991)
- Étienne Tshisekedi, Prime minister (1991)
- Bernardin Mungul Diaka, Prime minister (1991)
- Jean Nguza Karl-i-Bond, Prime minister (1991–1992)
- Étienne Tshisekedi, Prime minister (1992–1993)
- Faustin Birindwa, Prime minister (1993–1994)
- Léon Kengo, First state commissioner (1994–1997)
- Étienne Tshisekedi, Prime minister (1997)
- Likulia Bolongo, Prime minister (1997)

- Democratic Republic of the Congo (complete list) –

- Laurent-Désiré Kabila, President (1997–2001)

Congo: Republic of the

- French Equatorial Africa (complete list) –

Federation of colonies, 1910–1934; Colony, 1934–1958
For details see France under western Europe

- Republic of the Congo (Brazzaville)

- Presidents (complete list) –

- Fulbert Youlou, President (1960–1963)
- Alphonse Massamba-Débat, President (1963–1968)
- Alfred Raoul, President (1968–1969)

- Prime ministers (complete list) –

- Alphonse Massamba-Débat, Prime minister (1963)
- Pascal Lissouba, Prime minister (1963–1966)
- Ambroise Noumazalaye, Prime minister (1966–1968)
- Alfred Raoul, Prime minister (1968–1969)

- People's Republic of the Congo

- Presidents (complete list) –

- Marien Ngouabi, President (1969–1977)
- Military Committee of the Congolese Party of Labour (1977)
- Joachim Yhombi-Opango, President (1977–1979)
- Denis Sassou Nguesso, President (1979–1992)

- Prime ministers (complete list) –

- Henri Lopès, Prime minister (1973–1975)
- Louis Sylvain Goma, Prime minister (1975–1984)
- Ange Édouard Poungui, Prime minister (1984–1989)
- Alphonse Poaty-Souchlaty, Prime minister (1989–1990)
- Pierre Moussa, Acting Prime minister (1990–1991)
- Louis Sylvain Goma, Prime minister (1991)
- André Milongo, Prime minister (1991–1992)

- Republic of the Congo (Brazzaville)

- Presidents (complete list) –

- Pascal Lissouba, President (1992–1997)
- Denis Sassou Nguesso, President (1997–present)

- Prime ministers (complete list) –

- André Milongo, Prime minister (1992)
- Stéphane Maurice Bongho-Nouarra, Prime minister (1992)
- Claude Antoine Dacosta, Prime minister (1992–1993)
- Joachim Yhombi-Opango, Prime minister (1993–1996)
- Charles David Ganao, Prime minister (1996–1997)
- Bernard Kolélas, Prime minister (1997)

Equatorial Guinea

- Spanish Guinea (complete list) –

Colony, 1778–1968
For details see Spain in southwest Europe

- Equatorial Guinea

- Presidents (complete list) –

- Francisco Macías Nguema, President (1968–1979)
- Teodoro Obiang Nguema Mbasogo, President (1979–present)

- Prime ministers (complete list) –

- Cristino Seriche Bioko, Prime minister (1982–1992)
- Silvestre Siale Bileka, Prime minister (1992–1996)
- Ángel Serafín Seriche Dougan, Prime minister (1996–2001)

Gabon

- Gabon

- Presidents (complete list) –

- Léon M'ba, President (1960–1967)
- Omar Bongo, President (1967–2009)

- Prime ministers (complete list) –

- Léon M'ba, Prime minister (1957–1961)
- Léon Mébiame, Prime minister (1975–1990)
- Casimir Oyé-Mba, Prime minister (1990–1994)
- Paulin Obame-Nguema, Prime minister (1994–1999)
- Jean-François Ntoutoume Emane, Prime minister (1999–2006)

São Tomé and Príncipe

- Portuguese São Tomé and Príncipe (complete list) –

Colony, 1470–1951; Overseas province, 1951–1975
For details see the Kingdom of Portugal under Southwest Europe

- Democratic Republic of São Tomé and Príncipe

- Presidents (complete list) –

- Manuel Pinto da Costa, President (1975–1991)
- Miguel Trovoada, President (1991–2001)

- Prime ministers (complete list) –

- Miguel Trovoada, Prime minister (1975–1979)
- Celestino Rocha da Costa, Prime minister (1988–1991)
- Daniel Daio, Prime minister (1991–1992)
- Norberto Costa Alegre, Prime minister (1992–1994)
- Evaristo Carvalho, Prime minister (1994)
- Carlos Graça, Prime minister (1994–1995)
- Armindo Vaz d'Almeida, Prime minister (1995–1996)
- Raul Bragança Neto, Prime minister (1996–1999)
- Guilherme Posser da Costa, Prime minister (1999–2001)

=== Africa: East ===
Burundi

- Ruanda-Urundi (complete list) –

Belgian military occupation, 1916–1922; League of Nations mandate, 1922–1946; United Nations trust territory, 1946–1962
For details see Belgium under western Europe

- Kingdom of Burundi

- Kings (complete list) –

- Mwambutsa IV Bangiriceng, King (1915–1966)
- Ntare V, King (1966)

- Prime ministers (complete list) –

- André Muhirwa, Prime minister (1961–1963)
- Pierre Ngendandumwe, Prime minister (1963–1964)
- Albin Nyamoya, Prime minister (1964–1965)
- Pierre Ngendandumwe, Prime minister (1965)
- Pié Masumbuko, Prime minister (1965)
- Joseph Bamina, Prime minister (1965)
- Léopold Biha, Prime minister (1965–1966)
- Michel Micombero, Prime minister (1966)

- Republic of Burundi

- Presidents (complete list) –

- Michel Micombero, President (1966–1976)
- Jean-Baptiste Bagaza, President (1976–1987)
- Pierre Buyoya, President (1987–1993)
- Melchior Ndadaye, President (1993)
- François Ngeze, President (1993)
- Sylvie Kinigi, Acting President (1993–1994)
- Cyprien Ntaryamira, President (1994)
- Sylvestre Ntibantunganya, President (1994–1996)
- Pierre Buyoya, President (1996–2003)

- Prime ministers (complete list) –

- Albin Nyamoya, Prime minister (1972–1973)
- Édouard Nzambimana, Prime minister (1976–1978)
- Adrien Sibomana, Prime minister (1988–1993)
- Sylvie Kinigi, Prime minister (1993–1994)
- Anatole Kanyenkiko, Prime minister (1994–1995)
- Antoine Nduwayo, Prime minister (1995–1996)
- Pascal-Firmin Ndimira, Prime minister (1996–1998)

Comoros

- Territory of the Comoros (complete list) –

French overseas territory, 1946–1961; French autonomous territory, 1961–1975
For details see France under western Europe

- State of the Comoros

- Presidents (complete list) –

- Ahmed Abdallah, President (1975)
- Said Mohamed Jaffar, President (1975–1976)
- Ali Soilih, President (1976–1978)

- Prime ministers (complete list) –

- Abdallah Mohamed, Prime minister (1976–1978)

- Federal Islamic Republic of the Comoros

- Heads of state (complete list) –

- Mohamed Ahmed, Co-Chairman of the Directorate (1978)
- Ahmed Abdallah, Co-Chairman of the Directorate (1978), President (1978–1989)

- Prime ministers (complete list) –

- Salim Ben Ali, Prime minister (1978–1982)
- Ali Mroudjaé, Prime minister (1982–1984)

- Union of the Comoros

- Presidents (complete list) –

- Haribon Chebani, Provisional President (1989)
- Said Mohamed Djohar, Acting President (1989–1990), President (1990–1995)
- Combo Ayouba, Coordinator of the Transitional Military Committee (1995)
- Mohamed Taki Abdoulkarim, Acting President (1995)
- Caabi El-Yachroutu Mohamed, President (1995–1996)
- Said Mohamed Djohar, President (1996)
- Mohamed Taki Abdoulkarim, Acting President (1996–1998)
- Tadjidine Ben Said Massounde, President (1998–1999)
- Azali Assoumani, President (1999–2001)

- Prime ministers (complete list) –

- Mohamed Taki Abdoulkarim, Prime minister (1992)
- Ibrahim Halidi, Prime minister (1993)
- Said Ali Mohamed, Prime minister (1993)
- Ahmed Ben Cheikh Attoumane, Prime minister (1993–1994)
- Mohamed Abdou Madi, Prime minister (1994)
- Halifa Houmadi, Prime minister (1994–1995)
- Caabi El-Yachroutu Mohamed, Prime minister (1995–1996)
- Tadjidine Ben Said Massounde, Prime minister (1996)
- Ahmed Abdou, Prime minister (1996–1997)
- Nourdine Bourhane, Prime minister (1997–1998)
- Abbas Djoussouf, Prime minister (1998–1999)
- Bianrifi Tarmidi, Prime minister (1999–2000)
- Hamada Madi, Prime minister (2000–2002)

Djibouti

- French Somaliland (complete list) –

Overseas territory, 1946–1967

- French Territory of the Afars and the Issas (complete list) –

Overseas territory, 1967–1977
For details see France under western Europe

- Republic of Djibouti

- Presidents (complete list) –

- Hassan Gouled Aptidon, President (1977–1999)
- Ismaïl Omar Guelleh, President (1999–present)

- Prime ministers (complete list) –

- Hassan Gouled Aptidon, Prime minister (1977)
- Ahmed Dini Ahmed, Prime minister (1977–1978)
- Abdallah Mohamed Kamil, Prime minister (1978)
- Barkat Gourad Hamadou, Prime minister (1978–2001)

Eritrea

- Eritrea (complete list) –

- Isaias Afwerki, President (1993–present)

Ethiopia

- Ethiopian Empire (complete list) –

- Haile Selassie I, Emperor (1930–1974)

- Derg: Provisional Military Government of Socialist Ethiopia (complete list) –

- Aman Andom, Chairmen (1974)
- Mengistu Haile Mariam, Acting Chairmen (1974)
- Tafari Benti, Chairmen (1974–1977)
- Mengistu Haile Mariam, Chairmen (1977–1987)

- People's Democratic Republic of Ethiopia

- Presidents (complete list) –

- Mengistu Haile Mariam, President (1987–1991)
- Tesfaye Gebre Kidan, Acting President (1991)

- Prime ministers (complete list) –

- Fikre Selassie Wogderess, Prime minister (1987–1989)
- Hailu Yimenu, Acting Prime minister (1989–1991)
- Tesfaye Dinka, Acting Prime minister (1991)

- Transitional Government of Ethiopia

- Acting Presidents (complete list) –

- Meles Zenawi, Acting President (1991–1995)

- Prime minister (complete list) –

- Tamrat Layne, Acting Prime minister (1991–1995)

- Federal Democratic Republic of Ethiopia

- Presidents (complete list) –

- Negasso Gidada, President (1995–2001)

- Prime ministers (complete list) –

- Meles Zenawi, Prime minister (1995–2012)

Kenya

- Kenya Colony (complete list) –

British colony and protectorate, 1920–1963
For details see the United Kingdom under British Isles, Europe

- Kenya

- Heads of state (complete list) –

- Elizabeth II, Queen (1963–1964)
- Jomo Kenyatta, President (1964–1978)
- Daniel arap Moi, President (1978–2002)
- Mwai Kibaki, President (2002–2013)
- Uhuru Kenyatta, President (2013–2022)

- Prime ministers (complete list) –

- Jomo Kenyatta, Prime minister (1963–1964)

Madagascar

- French Madagascar (complete list) –

Colony, 1897–1958
For details see France under western Europe

- Malagasy Republic

- Presidents (complete list) –

- Philibert Tsiranana, President (1959–1972)
- Gabriel Ramanantsoa, President (1972–1975)
- Richard Ratsimandrava, President (1975)
- Gilles Andriamahazo, President (1975)
- Didier Ratsiraka, President (1975–1993)

- Prime ministers (complete list) –

- Philibert Tsiranana, Prime minister (1958–1959)
- Gabriel Ramanantsoa, Prime minister (1972–1975)

- Democratic Republic of Madagascar

- Presidents (complete list) –

- Didier Ratsiraka, President of Supreme Revolutionary Council (1975–1993)

- Prime ministers (complete list) –

- Joel Rakotomalala, Prime minister (1976)
- Justin Rakotoniaina, Prime minister (1976–1977)
- Désiré Rakotoarijaona, Prime minister (1977–1988)
- Victor Ramahatra, Prime minister (1988–1991)
- Guy Razanamasy, Prime minister (1991–1993)

- Madagascar: Third Republic

- Presidents (complete list) –

- Didier Ratsiraka, President (1975–1993)
- Albert Zafy, President (1993–1996)
- Norbert Ratsirahonana, Acting President (1996–1997)
- Didier Ratsiraka, President (1997–2002)

- Prime ministers (complete list) –

- Guy Razanamasy, Prime minister (1991–1993)
- Francisque Ravony, Prime minister (1993–1995)
- Emmanuel Rakotovahiny, Prime minister (1995–1996)
- Norbert Ratsirahonana, Prime minister (1996–1997)
- Pascal Rakotomavo, Prime minister (1997–1998)
- Tantely Andrianarivo, Prime minister (1998–2002)

Mauritius

- British Mauritius (complete list) –

Colony, 1810–1968
For details see the United Kingdom under British Isles, Europe

- Mauritius (Commonwealth realm)

- Queen (complete list) –

- Elizabeth II, Queen (1968–1992)

- Prime ministers (complete list) –

- Seewoosagur Ramgoolam, Prime minister (1968–1982)
- Anerood Jugnauth, Prime minister (1982–1992)

- Republic of Mauritius

- Presidents (complete list) –

- Veerasamy Ringadoo, President (1992)
- Cassam Uteem, President (1992–2002)

- Prime ministers (complete list) –

- Anerood Jugnauth, Prime minister (1992–1995)
- Navin Ramgoolam, Prime minister (1995–2000)
- Anerood Jugnauth, Prime minister (2000–2003)

Rwanda

- Kingdom of Rwanda (complete list) –

- Mutara III Rudahigwa, King (1931–1959)
- Kigeli V Ndahindurwa, King (1959–1961)

- Republic of Rwanda

- Presidents (complete list) –

- Dominique Mbonyumutwa, Interim President (1961)
- Grégoire Kayibanda, President (1961–1973)
- Juvénal Habyarimana, President (1973–1994)
- Théodore Sindikubwabo, Interim President (1994)
- Pasteur Bizimungu, President (1994–2000)
- Paul Kagame, President (2000–present)

- Prime ministers (complete list) –

- Grégoire Kayibanda, Prime minister (1961–1962)
- Sylvestre Nsanzimana, Prime minister (1991–1992)
- Dismas Nsengiyaremye, Prime minister (1992–1993)
- Agathe Uwilingiyimana, Prime minister (1993–1994)
- Jean Kambanda, Prime minister (1994)
- Faustin Twagiramungu, Prime minister (1994–1995)
- Pierre-Célestin Rwigema, Prime minister (1995–2000)
- Bernard Makuza, Prime minister (2000–2011)

Seychelles

- Colony of Seychelles

British colony, 1903–1976
For details see the United Kingdom under British Isles, Europe

- Republic of Seychelles

- Presidents (complete list) –

- James Mancham, President (1976–1977)
- France-Albert René, President (1977–2004)

- Prime ministers (complete list) –

- France-Albert René, Prime minister (1976–1977)

Somalia

- British Somaliland (complete list) –

Protectorate, 1884–1940, 1941–1960
For details see the United Kingdom under British Isles, Europe

- Trust Territory of Somaliland (complete list) –

United Nations trust territory of Italy, 1950–1960
For details see Italy under southcentral Europe

- State of Somaliland –

- Muhammad Haji Ibrahim Egal, Prime minister (1960)

- Somali Republic

- Presidents (complete list) –

- Aden Abdullah Osman Daar, President (1960–1967)
- Abdirashid Ali Shermarke, President (1967–1969)
- Sheikh Mukhtar Mohamed Hussein, Interim President (1969)

- Prime ministers (complete list) –

- Muhammad Haji Ibrahim Egal, Prime minister (1960)
- Abdirashid Ali Shermarke, Prime minister (1960–1964)
- Abdirizak Haji Hussein, Prime minister (1964–1967)
- Muhammad Haji Ibrahim Egal, Prime minister (1967–1969)

- Somali Democratic Republic

- Presidents (complete list) –

- Siad Barre, President (1969–1991)

- Prime ministers (complete list) –

- Muhammad Ali Samatar, Prime minister (1987–1990)
- Muhammad Hawadle Madar, Prime minister (1990–1991)

- Interim Government of Somalia

- Presidents (complete list) –

- Ali Mahdi Muhammad, President (1991–1997)

- Prime ministers (complete list) –

- Umar Arteh Ghalib, Prime minister (1991–1997)

- Republic of Somaliland (complete list) –

- Abdirahman Ahmed Ali Tuur, President (1991–1993)
- Muhammad Haji Ibrahim Egal, President (1993–2002)

- Transitional National Government of Somalia

- Presidents (complete list) –

- Abdiqasim Salad Hassan, President (2000–2004)

- Prime ministers (complete list) –

- Ali Khalif Galaydh, Prime minister (2000–2001)

Tanzania

- Sultanate of Zanzibar (complete list) –

- Khalifa II, Sultan (1911–1960)
- Abdullah, Sultan (1960–1963)
- Jamshid, Sultan (1963–1964)

- Tanganyika Territory under Britain (complete list) –

League of Nations mandate/ United Nations trust territory, 1922–1961
For details see the United Kingdom under British Isles, Europe

- Tanganyika (1961–1964)

- Heads of State (complete list) –

- Elizabeth II, Queen (1961–1962)
- Julius Nyerere, President (1962–1964)

- Prime ministers (complete list) –

- Julius Nyerere, Prime minister (1961–1962)
- Rashidi Kawawa, Prime minister (1962)

- United Republic of Tanzania

- Presidents (complete list) –

- Julius Nyerere, President (1964–1985)
- Ali Hassan Mwinyi, President (1985–1995)
- Benjamin Mkapa, President (1995–2005)

- Prime ministers (complete list) –

- Rashidi Kawawa, Prime minister (1972–1977)
- Edward Sokoine, prime minister (1977–1980)
- Cleopa Msuya, Prime minister (1980–1983)
- Edward Sokoine, Prime minister (1983–1984)
- Salim Ahmed Salim, Prime minister (1984–1985)
- Joseph Warioba, Prime minister (1985–1990)
- John Malecela, Prime minister (1990–1994)
- Cleopa Msuya, Prime minister (1994–1995)
- Frederick Sumaye, Prime minister (1995–2005)

Uganda

- Ankole (complete list) –

- Gasyonga II, Omugabe (1944–1967)

- Buganda (complete list) –

- Muteesa II, Kabaka (1939–1969)

- Bunyoro (complete list) –

- Winyi IV, Omukama (1925–1967)

- Protectorate of Uganda (complete list) –

British protectorate, 1894–1962
For details see the United Kingdom under British Isles, Europe

- Republic of Uganda

- Presidents (complete list) –

- Mutesa II, President (1963–1966)
- Milton Obote, President (1966–1971)
- Idi Amin, President (1971–1979)
- Yusuf Lule, Interim President (1979)
- Godfrey Binaisa, President (1979–1980)
- Paulo Muwanga, President (1980)
- Presidential Commission of Uganda (1980)
- Milton Obote, President (1980–1985)
- Bazilio Olara-Okello, de facto Head of state (1985)
- Tito Okello, President (1985–1986)
- Yoweri Museveni, President (1986–present)

- Prime ministers (complete list) –

- Benedicto Kiwanuka, Prime minister (1962)
- Milton Obote, Prime minister (1962–1966)
- Otema Allimadi, Prime minister (1980–1985)
- Paulo Muwanga, Prime minister (1985)
- Abraham Waligo, Prime minister (1985–1986)
- Samson Kisekka, Prime minister (1986–1991)
- George Cosmas Adyebo, Prime minister (1991–1994)
- Kintu Musoke, Prime minister (1994–1999)
- Apolo Nsibambi, Prime minister (1999–2011)

=== Africa: Northcentral ===
Libya

- Allied administration of Libya (UK & France) –

Allied military administration, 1942–1951

- Emirate of Cyrenaica (complete list) –

- Idris, Emir (1949–1951), King (1951–1969)

- Kingdom of Libya

- Monarch (complete list) –

- Idris, Emir (1949–1951), King (1951–1969)

- Prime ministers (complete list) –

- Mahmud al-Muntasir, Prime minister (1951–1954)
- Muhammad Sakizli, Prime minister (1954)
- Mustafa Ben Halim, Prime minister (1954–1957)
- Abdul Majid Kubar, Prime minister (1957–1960)
- Muhammad Osman Said, Prime minister (1960–1963)
- Mohieddin Fikini, Prime minister (1963–1964)
- Mahmud al-Muntasir, Prime minister (1964–1965)
- Hussein Maziq, Prime minister (1965–1967)
- Abdul Qadir al-Badri, Prime minister (1967)
- Abdul Hamid al-Bakkoush, Prime minister (1967–1968)
- Wanis al-Qaddafi, Prime minister (1968–1969)

- Libyan Arab Republic / Socialist People's Libyan Arab Jamahiriya

- Heads of state and Secretaries-General (complete list) –

- Muammar Gaddafi,

- Chairman of the Revolutionary Command Council (1969–1977)
- Secretary General of the General People's Congress (1977–1979)
- Brotherly Leader and Guide of the Revolution (1979–2011)

- Abdul Ati al-Obeidi, Secretary-General (1979–1981)
- Muhammad az-Zaruq Rajab, Secretary-General (1981–1984)
- Mifta al-Usta Umar, Secretary-General (1984–1990)
- Abdul Razzaq as-Sawsa, Secretary-General (1990–1992)
- Muhammad az-Zanati, Secretary-General (1992–2008)

- Prime ministers (complete list) –

- Mahmud Sulayman al-Maghribi, Prime minister (1969–1970)
- Muammar Gaddafi, Prime minister (1970–1972)
- Abdessalam Jalloud, Prime minister (1972–1977)
- Abdul Ati al-Obeidi, Prime minister (1977–1979)
- Jadallah Azzuz at-Talhi, Prime minister (1979–1984)
- Muhammad az-Zaruq Rajab, Prime minister (1984–1986)
- Jadallah Azzuz at-Talhi, Prime minister (1986–1987)
- Umar Mustafa al-Muntasir, Prime minister (1987–1990)
- Abuzed Omar Dorda, Prime minister (1990–1994)
- Abdul Majid al-Qa′ud, Prime minister (1994–1997)
- Muhammad Ahmad al-Mangoush, Prime minister (1997–2000)
- Imbarek Shamekh, Prime minister (2000–2003)

Tunisia

- Beylik of Tunis

- Beys (complete list) –

- Muhammad VIII al-Amin, Bey (1943–1956)

- Grand viziers (complete list) –

- Mohamed Chenik, Prime minister (1950–1952)
- Slaheddine Baccouche, Prime minister (1952–1954)
- Mohamed Salah Mzali, Prime minister (1954)
- Georges Dupoizat, Interim Prime minister (1954)
- Tahar Ben Ammar, Prime minister (1954–1956)

- French protectorate of Tunisia (complete list) –

Protectorate, 1881–1956
For details see France under western Europe

- Kingdom of Tunisia

- King (complete list) –

- Muhammad VIII al-Amin, King (1956–1957)

- Prime ministers (complete list) –

- Tahar Ben Ammar, Prime minister (1956)
- Habib Bourguiba, Prime minister (1956–1957)

- Republic of Tunisia

- Presidents (complete list) –

- Habib Bourguiba, President (1957–1987)
- Zine El Abidine Ben Ali, President (1987–2011)

- Prime ministers (complete list) –

- Bahi Ladgham, Prime minister (1969–1970)
- Hedi Amara Nouira, Prime minister (1970–1980)
- Mohammed Mzali, Prime minister (1980–1986)
- Rachid Sfar, Prime minister (1986–1987)
- Zine El Abidine Ben Ali, Prime minister (1987)
- Hédi Baccouche, Prime minister (1987–1989)
- Hamed Karoui, Prime minister (1989–1999)
- Mohamed Ghannouchi, Prime minister (1999–2011)

=== Africa: Northeast ===
Egypt

- Kingdom of Egypt

- King (complete list) –

- Farouk I, King (1936–1952)
- Fuad II, King (1952–1953)

- Prime ministers (complete list) –

- Mostafa El-Nahas, Prime minister (1950–1952)
- Aly Maher Pasha, Prime minister (1952)
- Ahmed Naguib el-Hilaly, Prime minister (1952)
- Hussein Serry Pasha, Prime minister (1952)
- Ahmed Naguib el-Hilaly, Prime minister (1952)
- Aly Maher Pasha, Prime minister (1952)
- Mohammed Naguib, Prime minister, government in rebellion (1952–1953)

- Republic of Egypt (1953–1958)

- Presidents (complete list) –

- Mohammed Naguib, President (1953–1954)
- Gamal Abdel Nasser, President (1954–1970)

- Prime ministers (complete list) –

- Mohammed Naguib, Prime minister, government in rebellion (1953–1954)
- Gamal Abdel Nasser, Prime minister, government in rebellion (1954)
- Mohammed Naguib, Prime minister, government in rebellion (1954)
- Gamal Abdel Nasser, Prime minister, government in rebellion (1954–1962)

- United Arab Republic –

- Gamal Abdel Nasser, President and Prime minister (1958–1961)

- Arab Republic of Egypt

- Presidents (complete list) –

- Gamal Abdel Nasser, President (1954–1970)
- Anwar Sadat, President (1970–1981)
- Sufi Abu Taleb, Interim President (1981)
- Hosni Mubarak, President (1981–2011)

- Prime ministers (complete list) –

- Gamal Abdel Nasser, Prime minister, government in rebellion (1954–1962)
- Ali Sabri, Prime minister (1962–1965)
- Zakaria Mohieddin, Prime minister (1965–1966)
- Mohamed Sedki Sulayman, Prime minister (1966–1967)
- Gamal Abdel Nasser, Prime minister (1967–1970)
- Mahmoud Fawzi, Prime minister (1970–1972)
- Aziz Sedky, Prime minister (1972–1973)
- Anwar Sadat, Prime minister (1973–1974)
- Abd El Aziz Mohamed Hegazi, Prime minister (1974–1975)
- Mamdouh Salem, Prime minister (1975–1978)
- Mustafa Khalil, Prime minister (1978–1980)
- Anwar Sadat, Prime minister (1980–1981)
- Hosni Mubarak, Prime minister (1981–1982)
- Ahmad Fuad Mohieddin, Prime minister (1982–1984)
- Kamal Hassan Ali, Prime minister (1984–1985)
- Aly Lotfy Mahmoud, Prime minister (1985–1986)
- Atef Sedky, Prime minister (1986–1996)
- Kamal Ganzouri, Prime minister (1996–1999)
- Atef Ebeid, Prime minister (1999–2004)

Sudan

- Anglo-Egyptian Sudan (complete list / complete list) –

Condominium of the United Kingdom and Egypt, 1899–1956
For details see the United Kingdom under British Isles, Europe

- Republic of the Sudan (1956–1969)

- Presidents (complete list) –

- Ibrahim Abboud, President (1958–1964)
- Sirr Al-Khatim Al-Khalifa, President (1964–1965)
- Ismail al-Azhari, President (1965–1969)

- Prime ministers (complete list) –

- Ismail al-Azhari, Prime minister (1954–1956)
- Abdallah Khalil, Prime minister (1956–1958)
- Ibrahim Abboud, Prime minister (1958–1964)
- Sirr Al-Khatim Al-Khalifa, Prime minister (1964–1965)
- Muhammad Ahmad Mahgoub, Prime minister (1965–1966)
- Sadiq al-Mahdi, Prime minister (1966–1967)
- Muhammad Ahmad Mahgoub, Prime minister (1967–1969)

- Democratic Republic of the Sudan

- Presidents (complete list) –

- Gaafar Nimeiry, President (1969–1985)

- Prime ministers (complete list) –

- Babiker Awadalla, Prime minister (1969)
- Gaafar Nimeiry, Prime minister (1969–1976)
- Rashid Bakr, Prime minister (1976–1977)
- Gaafar Nimeiry, Prime minister (1977–1985)
- Al-Jazuli Daf'allah, Prime minister (1985)

- Republic of the Sudan

- Presidents (complete list) –

- Abdel Rahman Swar al-Dahab, President (1985–1986)
- Ahmed al-Mirghani, President (1986–1989)
- Omar al-Bashir, President (1989–2019)

- Prime ministers (complete list) –

- Al-Jazuli Daf'allah, Prime minister (1985–1986)
- Sadiq al-Mahdi, Prime minister (1986–1989)

=== Africa: Northwest ===
Algeria

- French Algeria (complete list) –

French Départements, 1830–1962
For details see France under western Europe

- People's Democratic Republic of Algeria

- Presidents (complete list) –

- Abderrahmane Farès, President (1962)
- Ferhat Abbas, President (1962–1963)
- Ahmed Ben Bella, President (1963–1965)
- Houari Boumediene

- Chairman of the Revolutionary Council (1965–1976)
- President (1976–1978)

- Rabah Bitat, Interim President (1978–1979)
- Chadli Bendjedid, President (1979–1992)
- Abdelmalek Benhabyles, Interim President (1992)
- Mohamed Boudiaf, Chairman of the High Council (1992)
- Ali Kafi, President (1992–1994)
- Liamine Zéroual, President (1994–1999)
- Abdelaziz Bouteflika, President (1999–2019)

- Prime ministers (complete list) –

- Ahmed Ben Bella, Prime minister (1962–1963)
- Mohamed Ben Ahmed Abdelghani, Prime minister (1979–1984)
- Abdelhamid Brahimi, Prime minister (1984–1988)
- Kasdi Merbah, Prime minister (1988–1989)
- Mouloud Hamrouche, Prime minister (1989–1991)
- Sid Ahmed Ghozali, Prime minister (1991–1992)
- Belaid Abdessalam, Prime minister (1992–1993)
- Redha Malek, Prime minister (1993–1994)
- Mokdad Sifi, Prime minister (1994–1995)
- Ahmed Ouyahia, Prime minister (1995–1998)
- Smail Hamdani, Prime minister (1998–1999)
- Ahmed Benbitour, Prime minister (1999–2000)
- Ali Benflis, Prime minister (2000–2003)

Morocco

- Sultanate/ Kingdom of Morocco

French protectorate, 1912–1956; Spanish protectorate, 1912–1956; Tangier International Zone, 1924–1956
- Alaouite dynasty (complete list) –

- Mohammed V, Sultan (1927–1953, 1955–1957), King (1957–1961)
- Mohammed Ben Aarafa, Sultan (1953–1955)
- Hassan II, King (1961–1999)
- Mohammed VI, King (1999–present)

- Prime ministers (complete list) –

- Mbarek Bekkay, Prime minister (1955–1958)
- Ahmed Balafrej, Prime minister (1958)
- Abdallah Ibrahim, Prime minister (1958–1960)
- Ahmed Bahnini, Prime minister (1963–1965)
- Mohamed Benhima, Prime minister (1967–1969)
- Ahmed Laraki, Prime minister (1969–1971)
- Mohammed Karim Lamrani, Prime minister (1971–1972)
- Ahmed Osman, Prime minister (1972–1979)
- Maati Bouabid, Prime minister (1979–1983)
- Mohammed Karim Lamrani, Prime minister (1983–1986)
- Azzeddine Laraki, Prime minister (1986–1992)
- Mohammed Karim Lamrani, Prime minister (1992–1994)
- Abdellatif Filali, Prime minister (1994–1998)
- Abderrahmane Youssoufi, Prime minister (1998–2002)

- Spanish Sahara, (complete list) –

Overseas territory, 1884–1958; Overseas province, 1958–1975
For details see Spain in southwest Europe

- Sahrawi Arab Democratic Republic, has limited recognition: Morocco claims Western Sahara

- Presidents (complete list) –

- El-Ouali Mustapha Sayed, President (1976)
- Mahfoud Ali Beiba, Acting President (1976)
- Mohamed Abdelaziz, President (1976–2016)

- Prime ministers (complete list) –

- Mohamed Lamine Ould Ahmed, Prime minister (1976–1982)
- Mahfoud Ali Beiba, Prime minister (1982–1985)
- Mohamed Lamine Ould Ahmed, Prime minister (1985–1988)
- Mahfoud Ali Beiba, Prime minister (1988–1993)
- Bouchraya Hammoudi Bayoun, Prime minister (1993–1995)
- Mahfoud Ali Beiba, Prime minister (1995–1999)
- Bouchraya Hammoudi Bayoun, Prime minister (1999–2003)

=== Africa: South ===
Botswana

- Bechuanaland Protectorate (complete list) –

British protectorate, 1885–1966
For details see the United Kingdom under British Isles, Europe

- Republic of Botswana

- Presidents (complete list) –

- Seretse Khama, President (1966–1980)
- Quett Masire, President (1980–1998)
- Festus Mogae, President (1998–2008)

- Prime ministers (complete list) –

- Seretse Khama, Prime minister (1965–1966)

Eswatini/ Swaziland

- Protectorate of Swaziland

- Kings (complete list) –

- Sobhuza II, Paramount Chief under British rule (1921–1968), King (1968–1982)

- tiNdlovukati (complete list) –

- Nukwase Ndwandwe, Ndlovukati (1938–1957)
- Zihlathi Ndwandwe/Mkhatjwa, Ndlovukati (1957–1975)

- Kingdom of Eswatini (Swaziland)

- Kings (complete list) –

- Sobhuza II, Paramount Chief under British rule (1921–1968), King (1968–1982)
- Dzeliwe, Regent (1982–1983)
- Ntfombi, Regent (1983–1986)
- Mswati III, King (1986–present)

- tiNdlovukati (complete list) –

- Zihlathi Ndwandwe/Mkhatjwa, Ndlovukati (1957–1975)
- Seneleleni, Ndlovukati (1975–1980)
- Dzeliwe, Ndlovukati (1980–1983)
- Ntfombi, Queen Regent (1983–1986), Ndlovukati (1983–present)

- Prime ministers (complete list) –

- Makhosini Dlamini, Prime minister (1967–1976)
- Maphevu Dlamini, Prime minister (1976–1979)
- Ben Nsibandze, Acting Prime minister (1979)
- Mabandla Dlamini, Prime minister (1979–1983)
- Bhekimpi Dlamini, Prime minister (1983–1986)
- Sotsha Dlamini, Prime minister (1986–1989)
- Obed Dlamini, Prime minister (1989–1993)
- Andreas Fakudze, Acting Prime minister (1993)
- Jameson Mbilini Dlamini, Prime minister (1993–1996)
- Sishayi Nxumalo, Acting Prime minister (1996)
- Barnabas Sibusiso Dlamini, Prime minister (1996–2003)

Lesotho

- Colony of Basutoland (complete list) –

British colony, 1884–1966
For details see the United Kingdom under British Isles, Europe
- Paramount Chiefs (complete list) –

- 'Mantšebo, Regent (1941–1960)
- Moshoeshoe II, Paramount Chief (1960–1966), King (1966–1990, 1995–1996)

- Kingdom of Lesotho

- Monarchs (complete list) –

- Moshoeshoe II, Paramount Chief (1960–1966), King (1966–1990, 1995–1996)
- Letsie III, King (1990–1995, 1996–present)

- Heads of government (complete list) –

- Leabua Jonathan, Prime minister (1965–1986)
- Justin Lekhanya, Chairman of the Military Council (1986–1991)
- Elias Phisoana Ramaema, Chairman of the Military Council (1991–1993)
- Ntsu Mokhehle, Prime minister (1993–1994)
- Hae Phoofolo, Interim Prime minister (1994)
- Ntsu Mokhehle, Prime minister (1994–1998)
- Pakalitha Mosisili, Prime minister (1998–2012)

Malawi

- Nyasaland Protectorate (complete list) –

British protectorate, 1907–1964
For details see the United Kingdom under British Isles, Europe

- Malawi (Commonwealth realm) :

- Monarch (complete list) –

- Elizabeth II, Queen (1964–1966)

- Prime ministers (complete list) –

- Hastings Banda, Prime minister (1964–1966)

- Republic of Malawi (complete list) –

- Hastings Banda, President (1966–1994)
- Bakili Muluzi, President (1994–2004)

Mozambique

- Portuguese Mozambique (complete list) –

Colony, 1498–1972; Territory, 1972–1975
For details see the Kingdom of Portugal under Southwest Europe

- People's Republic of Mozambique

- Presidents (complete list) –

- Samora Machel, President (1975–1986)
- Political Bureau of the Central Committee of FRELIMO (1986)
- Joaquim Chissano, President (1986–1990)

- Prime ministers (complete list) –

- Mário da Graça Machungo, Prime minister (1986–1990)

- Republic of Mozambique

- Presidents (complete list) –

- Joaquim Chissano, President (1990–2005)

- Prime ministers (complete list) –

- Mário da Graça Machungo, Prime minister (1990–1994)
- Pascoal Mocumbi, Prime minister (1994–2004)

Namibia

- South West Africa (complete list) –

United Nations trust territory, 1946–1990
For details see the South African Republic under southern Africa

- Namibia

- Presidents (complete list) –

- Sam Nujoma, President (1990–2005)

- Prime ministers (complete list) –

- Hage Geingob, Prime minister (1990–2002)

South Africa

- Union of South Africa

- Monarchs (complete list) –

- George VI, King (1936–1952)
- Elizabeth II, Queen (1952–1961)

- Prime ministers (complete list) –

- Daniel François Malan, Prime minister (1948–1954)
- Johannes Gerhardus Strijdom, Prime minister (1954–1958)
- Hendrik Verwoerd, Prime minister (1958–1966)

- Republic of South Africa

- State presidents (complete list) –

- Charles Robberts Swart, State President (1961–1967)
- Jozua François Naudé, Acting State President (1967–1968)
- Jacobus Johannes Fouché, State President (1968–1975)
- Johannes de Klerk, Acting State President (1975)
- Nico Diederichs, State President (1975–1978)
- Marais Viljoen, Acting State President (1978)
- Balthazar Johannes Vorster, State President (1978–1979)
- Marais Viljoen, State President (1979–1984)
- P. W. Botha, State President (1984–1989)
- F. W. de Klerk, State President (1989–1994)

- Presidents (complete list) –

- Nelson Mandela, President (1994–1999)
- Thabo Mbeki, President (1999–2008)

- Prime ministers (complete list) –

- Hendrik Verwoerd, Prime minister (1958–1966)
- Balthazar Johannes Vorster, Prime minister (1966–1978)
- Pieter Willem Botha, Prime minister (1978–1984)

- Bophuthatswana (complete list) –

- Lucas Mangope, Chief Executive officer/Councillor (1968–1972), Chief Minister (1972–1977), President (1977–1994)
- Rocky Malebane-Metsing, President (1994)

- Ciskei (complete list) –

- Lennox Sebe, President (1981–1990)
- Oupa Gqozo, Chairman (1990–1994)

- Transkei

- Presidents (complete list) –

- Botha Sigcau, President (1976–1978)
- Zwelibanzi Maneli Mabandla, Acting President (1978–1979)
- Kaiser Matanzima, President (1979–1986)
- Tutor Nyangelizwe Vulindlela Ndamase, President (1986–1994)

- Prime ministers (complete list) –

- Kaiser Matanzima, Prime minister (1976–1979)
- George Matanzima, Prime minister (1979–1987)
- Dumnisani Gladstone Gwadiso, Acting Prime minister (1987)
- Stella Sigcau, Prime minister (1987)
- Bantu Holomisa, Head of the Military Council (1987–1994)

- Venda (complete list) –

- Patrick Mphephu, President (1979–1988)
- Frank Ravele, Acting President (1988–1990)
- Gabriel Ramushwana, Military Chairman (1990–1994)
- Tshamano Ramabulana, Military Chairman (1994)

Zambia

- Barotseland (complete list) –

- Mwanawina III, Mbumu wa Litunga (1948–1968)

- Northern Rhodesia (complete list) –

British protectorate, 1924–1964
For details see the United Kingdom under British Isles, Europe

- Federation of Rhodesia and Nyasaland (complete list) –

Self-governing British colony, 1953–1963
For details see the United Kingdom under British Isles, Europe

- Republic of Zambia

- Presidents (complete list) –

- Kenneth Kaunda, President (1964–1991)
- Frederick Chiluba, President (1991–2002)

- Prime ministers (complete list) –

- Mainza Chona, Prime minister (1973–1975)
- Elijah Mudenda, Prime minister (1975–1977)
- Mainza Chona, Prime minister (1977–1978)
- Daniel Lisulo, Prime minister (1978–1981)
- Nalumino Mundia, Prime minister (1981–1985)
- Kebby Musokotwane, Prime minister (1985–1989)
- Malimba Masheke, Prime minister (1989–1991)

Zimbabwe

- Southern Rhodesia (complete list) –

British protectorate, 1923–1965, 1979–1980
For details see the United Kingdom under British Isles, Europe

- Rhodesia, unrecognised state

- Presidents (complete list) –

- Clifford Dupont, President (1970–1975)
- Henry Everard, Acting President (1975–1976)
- John Wrathall, President (1976–1978)
- Henry Everard, Acting President (1978)
- Jack William Pithey, Acting President (1978–1979)
- Henry Everard, Acting President (1979)

- Prime ministers (complete list) –

- Ian Smith, Prime minister (1964–1979)

- Zimbabwe Rhodesia

- Presidents (complete list) –

- Josiah Zion Gumede, President (1979)

- Prime ministers (complete list) –

- Abel Muzorewa, Prime minister (1979)

- Republic of Zimbabwe

- Presidents (complete list) –

- Canaan Banana, President (1980–1987)
- Robert Mugabe, President (1987–2017)

- Prime ministers (complete list) –

- Robert Mugabe, Prime minister (1980–1987)

=== Africa: West ===
Benin

- French Dahomey, part of French West Africa (complete list) –

Colony, 1904–1958
For details see France under western Europe

- Republic of Dahomey

- Presidents (complete list) –

- Hubert Maga, President (1960–1963)
- Christophe Soglo, Head of the Provisional Government (1963–1964)
- Sourou-Migan Apithy, President (1964–1965)
- Justin Ahomadégbé-Tomêtin, Acting President (1965)
- Tahirou Congacou, Acting President (1965)
- Christophe Soglo, President (1965–1967)
- Jean-Baptiste Hachème, Chairman of the Revolutionary Committee (1967)
- Maurice Kouandété, Head of State (1967)
- Alphonse Alley, Head of State (1967–1968)
- Émile Derlin Zinsou, President (1968–1969)
- Maurice Kouandété, Chief of Staff of the Army (1969)
- Paul-Émile de Souza, Chairman of the Directory (1969–1970)
- Hubert Maga, Chairman of the Presidential Council (1970–1972)
- Justin Ahomadégbé-Tomêtin, Chairman of the Presidential Council (1972)
- Mathieu Kérékou, President (1972–1975)

- Prime ministers (complete list) –

- Hubert Maga, Prime minister (1960)
- Justin Ahomadégbé-Tomêtin, Prime minister (1964–1965)
- Christophe Soglo, Prime minister (1965–1967)
- Maurice Kouandété, Prime minister (1967–1972)

- People's Republic of Benin (complete list) –

- Mathieu Kérékou, President (1975–1990)

- Republic of Benin

- Presidents (complete list) –

- Mathieu Kérékou, President (1990–1991)
- Nicéphore Soglo, President (1991–1996)
- Mathieu Kérékou, President (1996–2006)

- Prime ministers (complete list) –

- Nicéphore Soglo, Prime minister (1990–1991)
- Adrien Houngbédji, Prime minister (1996–1998)

Burkina Faso

- Kingdom of Koala (complete list) –

- Yempaabu, King (1941–1986)

- Mossi Kingdom of Bilanga (complete list) –

- Banyikuba, Bilanbedo (1927–1970)

- Mossi Kingdom of Con (complete list) –

- Yencabri, ruler (1942–1969)

- Mossi Kingdom of Liptako (complete list) –

- Abdullahi Sandu bi Faruku, Almami (1932–1956)
- Usman bi Amiru, Almami (1956–1959)

- Mossi Kingdom of Macakoali (complete list) –

- Yendieri, Boopo (1945–1976)

- Mossi Kingdom of Pama –

- Huntani, Jafuali (1938–1952)
- Yempaabu, Jafuali (1952–?)

- Mossi Kingdom of Tenkodogo (complete list) –

- Yamba Sorgo, Naaba (1933–1957)

- Mossi Kingdom of Wogodogo (complete list) –

- Naaba Saaga II, Moogo-naaba (1942–1957)
- Naaba Kugri, Moogo-naaba (1957–1982)

- Mossi Kingdom of Yatenga (complete list) –

- Naaba Tigre, Yatenga naaba (1914–1954)
- Naaba Sigiri, Yatenga naaba (1954–1960)

- French Upper Volta part of French West Africa (complete list) –

Colony, 1919–1932, 1947–1958
For details see France under western Europe

- French Upper Volta/ Republic of Upper Volta

- Presidents (complete list) –

- Maurice Yaméogo, President (1960–1966)
- Sangoulé Lamizana, President (1966–1980)
- Saye Zerbo, President (1980–1982)
- Jean-Baptiste Ouédraogo, President (1982–1983)
- Thomas Sankara, President (1983–1984)

- Prime ministers (complete list) –

- Gérard Kango Ouédraogo, Prime minister (1971–1974)
- Sangoulé Lamizana, Prime minister (1974–1978)
- Joseph Conombo, Prime minister (1978–1980)
- Saye Zerbo, Prime minister (1980–1982)
- Thomas Sankara, Prime minister (1983)

- Republic of Burkina Faso

- Presidents (complete list) –

- Thomas Sankara, President (1984–1987)
- Blaise Compaoré, President (1987–2014)

- Prime ministers (complete list) –

- Youssouf Ouédraogo, Prime minister (1992–1994)
- Roch Marc Christian Kaboré, Prime minister (1994–1996)
- Kadré Désiré Ouedraogo, Prime minister (1996–2000)
- Paramanga Ernest Yonli, Prime minister (2000–2007)

Cape Verde

- Portuguese Cape Verde (complete list) –

Colony, 1462–1951; Overseas province, 1951–1975
For details see the Kingdom of Portugal under Southwest Europe

- Republic of Cape Verde

- Presidents (complete list) –

- Aristides Pereira, President (1975–1991)
- António Mascarenhas Monteiro, President (1991–2001)

- Prime ministers (complete list) –

- Pedro Pires, Prime minister (1975–1991)
- Carlos Veiga, Prime minister (1991–2000)
- Gualberto do Rosário, Prime minister (2000–2001)

Gambia

- Gambia Colony and Protectorate (complete list) –

British colony and protectorate, 1821–1965
For details see the United Kingdom under British Isles, Europe

- The Gambia (1965–1970)

- Head of State (complete list) –

- Elizabeth II, Queen (1965–1970)

- Prime ministers (complete list) –

- Dawda Jawara, Prime minister (1965–1970)

- Republic of the Gambia (complete list) –

- Dawda Jawara, President (1970–1994)
- Yahya Jammeh, Chairman of the Armed Forces Provisional Ruling Council (1994–1996), President (1996–2017)

Ghana

- Kingdom of Ashanti (complete list) –

- Osei Tutu Agyeman Prempeh II, King (1935–1957)

- Gold Coast (complete list) –

British colony, 1821–1957
For details see the United Kingdom under British Isles, Europe

- Dominion of Ghana

- Head of State (complete list) –

- Elizabeth II, Queen (1957–1960)

- Prime ministers (complete list) –

- Kwame Nkrumah, Prime minister (1957–1960)

- Republic of Ghana (complete list) –

- Kwame Nkrumah, President of the First Republic (1960–1966)
- Joseph Arthur Ankrah, Military Head of State (1966–1969)
- Akwasi Afrifa, Military Head of State (1969)
- Akwasi Afrifa, President of the Second Republic (1969–1970)
- Nii Amaa Ollennu, Acting President of the Second Republic (1970)
- Edward Akufo-Addo, President of the Second Republic (1970–1972)
- Ignatius Kutu Acheampong, Military Head of State (1972–1978)
- Fred Akuffo, Military Head of State (1978–1979)
- Jerry Rawlings, Military Head of State (1979)
- Hilla Limann, President of the Third Republic (1979–1981)
- Jerry Rawlings, Military Head of State (1981–1993), President of the Fourth Republic (1993–2001)

Guinea

- French Guinea part of French West Africa (complete list) –

French colony, 1894–1958
For details see France under western Europe

- Republic of Guinea

- Presidents (complete list) –

- Ahmed Sékou Touré, President (1958–1984)
- Louis Lansana Beavogui, Acting President (1984)
- Lansana Conté, President (1984–2008)

- Prime ministers (complete list) –

- Louis Lansana Beavogui, Prime minister (1972–1984)
- Diarra Traoré, Prime minister (1984)
- Sidya Touré, Prime minister (1996–1999)
- Lamine Sidimé, Prime minister (1999–2004)

Guinea-Bissau

- Portuguese Guinea (complete list) –

Colony, 1474–1951; Overseas province, 1951–1974
For details see the Kingdom of Portugal under Southwest Europe

- Guinea-Bissau

- Presidents (complete list) –

- Luís Cabral, President (1973–1980)
- João Bernardo Vieira, President (1980–1984)
- Carmen Pereira, Acting President (1984)
- João Bernardo Vieira, President (1984–1999)
- Ansumane Mané, Chairman of the Supreme Command of the Military Junta (1999)
- Malam Bacai Sanhá, Acting President (1999–2000)
- Kumba Ialá, President (2000–2003)

- Prime ministers (complete list) –

- Francisco Mendes, Prime minister (1973–1978)
- Constantino Teixeira, Prime minister (1978)
- João Bernardo Vieira, Prime minister (1978–1980)
- Victor Saúde Maria, Prime minister (1982–1984)
- Carlos Correia, Prime minister (1991–1994)
- Manuel Saturnino da Costa, Prime minister (1994–1997)
- Carlos Correia, Prime minister (1997–1998)
- Francisco Fadul, Prime minister (1998–2000)
- Caetano N'Tchama, Prime minister (2000–2001)

Ivory Coast

- French Ivory Coast part of French West Africa (complete list) –

Colony, 1893–1960
For details see France under western Europe

- Republic of Ivory Coast

- Presidents (complete list) –

- Félix Houphouët-Boigny, President (1960–1993)
- Henri Konan Bédié, President (1993–1999)
- Robert Guéï, President (1999–2000)
- Laurent Gbagbo, President (2000–2011)

- Prime ministers (complete list) –

- Félix Houphouët-Boigny, Prime minister (1960)
- Alassane Ouattara, Prime minister (1990–1993)
- Daniel Kablan Duncan, Prime minister (1993–1999)
- Seydou Diarra, Prime minister (2000)
- Pascal Affi N'Guessan, Prime minister (2000–2003)

Liberia

- Liberia (complete list) –

- William Tubman, President (1944–1971)
- William R. Tolbert Jr., President (1971–1980)
- Samuel Doe, Chairman of the People's Redemption Council (1980–1986), president (1986–1990)
- Amos Sawyer, President of the Interim Government of National Unity (1990–1994)
- David D. Kpormakpor, Chairman of the Council of State (1994–1995)
- Wilton G. S. Sankawulo, Chairman of the Council of State (1995–1996)
- Ruth Perry, Chairwoman of the Council of State (1996–1997)
- Charles Taylor, President (1997–2003)

Mali

- French Sudan part of French West Africa (complete list) –

Colony, 1880–1958

- Mali Federation (complete list) –

French territory, united together with Senegal 1959–1960
For details see France under western Europe

- Republic of Mali

- Heads of state (complete list) –

- Modibo Keïta, Head of State (1960–1965), President (1965–1968)
- Moussa Traoré, Chairman of the Military Committee for National Liberation (1968–1969), Head of State (1969–1979), President (1979–1991)
- Amadou Toumani Touré, Chairman of the National Reconciliation Council (1991), Chairman of the Transitional Committee (1991–1992)
- Alpha Oumar Konaré, President (1992–2002)

- Prime ministers (complete list) –

- Modibo Keïta, Prime minister (1960–1965)
- Yoro Diakité, Prime minister (1968–1969)
- Mamadou Dembelé, Prime minister (1986–1988)
- Soumana Sacko, Acting Prime minister (1991–1992)
- Younoussi Touré, Prime minister (1992–1993)
- Abdoulaye Sékou Sow, Prime minister (1993–1994)
- Ibrahim Boubacar Keïta, Prime minister (1994–2000)
- Mandé Sidibé, Prime minister (2000–2002)

Mauritania

- Colonial Mauritania part of French West Africa (complete list) –

French colony, 1903–1960
For details see France under western Europe

- Islamic Republic of Mauritania

- Heads of state (complete list) –

- Moktar Ould Daddah, Acting Head of State (1960–1978), President (1960–1978)
- Mustafa Ould Salek, Chairman of the Military Committee for National Recovery (1978–1979)
- Mohamed Mahmoud Ould Louly, Chairman of the Military Committee for National Salvation (1979–1980)
- Mohamed Khouna Ould Haidalla, Chairman of the Military Committee for National Salvation (1980–1984)
- Maaouya Ould Sid'Ahmed Taya, Chairman of the Military Committee for National Salvation (1984–1992), President (1992–2005)

- Prime ministers (complete list) –

- Moktar Ould Daddah, Prime minister (1960–1961)
- Ahmed Ould Bouceif, Prime minister (1979)
- Ahmed Salim Ould Sidi, Acting Prime minister (1979)
- Mohamed Khouna Ould Haidalla, Prime minister (1979–1980)
- Sid Ahmed Ould Bneijara, Prime minister (1980–1981)
- Maaouya Ould Sid'Ahmed Taya, Prime minister (1981–1984)
- Mohamed Khouna Ould Haidalla, Prime minister (1984)
- Maaouya Ould Sid'Ahmed Taya, Prime minister (1984–1992)
- Sidi Mohamed Ould Boubacar, Prime minister (1992–1996)
- Cheikh El Avia Ould Mohamed Khouna, Prime minister (1996–1997)
- Mohamed Lemine Ould Guig, Prime minister (1997–1998)
- Cheikh El Avia Ould Mohamed Khouna, Prime minister (1998–2003)

Niger

- Dosso Kingdom (complete list) –

- Zarmakoy Moumouni, King (1938–1953)
- Zarmakoy Hamani, King (1953–1962)

- Colony of Niger part of French West Africa (complete list) –

French colony, 1921–1960
For details see France under western Europe

- Republic of the Niger

- Heads of state (complete list) –

- Hamani Diori, President of the Republic (1960–1974)
- Seyni Kountché, President of the Supreme Military Council (1974–1987)
- Ali Saibou, President of the Supreme Military Council (1987–1989), President of the Republic (1989–1993)
- Mahamane Ousmane, President of the Republic (1993–1996)
- Ibrahim Baré Maïnassara, President of the Republic (1996–1999)
- Daouda Malam Wanké, Chairman of the National Reconciliation Council (1999)
- Mamadou Tandja, President of the Republic (1999–2010)

- Prime ministers (complete list) –

- Hamani Diori, Prime minister (1958–1960)
- Mamane Oumarou, Prime minister (1983)
- Hamid Algabid, Prime minister (1983–1988)
- Mamane Oumarou, Prime minister (1988–1989)
- Aliou Mahamidou, Prime minister (1990–1991)
- Amadou Cheiffou, Prime minister (1991–1993)
- Mahamadou Issoufou, Prime minister (1993–1994)
- Souley Abdoulaye, Prime minister (1994–1995)
- Amadou Cissé, Prime minister (1995)
- Hama Amadou, Prime minister (1995–1996)
- Boukary Adji, Prime minister (1996)
- Amadou Cissé, Prime minister (1996–1997)
- Ibrahim Hassane Mayaki, Prime minister (1997–2000)
- Hama Amadou, Prime minister (2000–2007)

Nigeria

- Biafra (complete list) –

- C. Odumegwu Ojukwu, President (1967–1970)
- Philip Effiong, President (1970)

- Egba Ake –

- Ladapo Samuel Ademola II, Alake (1872–1962), in exile (1948–1950), Ruler (1920–1962)

- Ilorin Emirate –

- Abdulkadir Dan Bawa, Emir (1920–1959)
- Zulkarnayni Gambari "Aiyelabowo V", Emir (1959–1992)

- Suleja Emirate (complete list) –

- Sulaimanu Barau, Emir (1944–1979)

- Lagos Colony (complete list) –

British colony, 1862–1906, British colony and protectorate, 1890s–1906
For details see the United Kingdom under British Isles, Europe

- Colonial Nigeria (complete list) –

British colony, 1914–1960
For details see the United Kingdom under British Isles, Europe

- Federal Republic of Nigeria: Fourth Republic (complete list) –

- Elizabeth II, Queen (1960–1963)
- Nnamdi Azikiwe, President of the First Republic (1963–1966)
- Johnson Aguiyi-Ironsi, Military Head of State (1966)
- Yakubu Gowon, Military Head of State (1966–1975)
- Murtala Mohammed, Military Head of State (1975–1976)
- Olusegun Obasanjo, Military Head of State (1976–1979)
- Shehu Shagari, President of the Second Republic (1979–1983)
- Muhammadu Buhari, Military Head of State (1983–1985)
- Ibrahim Babangida, Military Head of State (1985–1993)
- Ernest Shonekan, Transition Head of State Third Republic (1993)
- Sani Abacha, Military Head of State (1993–1998)
- Abdulsalami Abubakar, Military Head of State (1998–1999)
- Olusegun Obasanjo, President of the Fourth Republic (1999–2007)

Senegal

- Kingdom of Sine (complete list) –

- Mahecor Joof, Maad a Sinig (1924–c.1960)

- Saloum (complete list) –

- Fode N'Gouye Joof, Maad Saloum (1935–c.1960)

- French West Africa (complete list) –

Federation of colonies, 1895–1958
For details see France under western Europe

- French Senegal part of French West Africa (complete list) –

French colony, 1659–1960
For details see France under western Europe

- Senegambia Confederation

- Abdou Diouf, President (1982–1989)

- Republic of Senegal

- Presidents (complete list) –

- Léopold Sédar Senghor, President (1960–1980)
- Abdou Diouf, President (1981–2000)
- Abdoulaye Wade, President (2000–2012)

- Prime ministers (complete list) –

- Mamadou Dia, Prime minister (1960–1962)
- Abdou Diouf, Prime minister (1970–1980)
- Habib Thiam, Prime minister (1981–1983)
- Moustapha Niasse, Acting Prime minister (1983)
- Habib Thiam, Prime minister (1991–1998)
- Mamadou Lamine Loum, Prime minister (1998–2000)
- Moustapha Niasse, Prime minister (2000–2001)

Sierra Leone

- Sierra Leone Colony and Protectorate (complete list) –

British colony and protectorate, 1808–1961
For details see the United Kingdom under British Isles, Europe

- Sierra Leone (Commonwealth realm)

- Monarch (complete list) –

- Elizabeth II, Queen (1961–1971)

- Prime ministers (complete list) –

- Milton Margai, Prime minister (1961–1964)
- Albert Margai, Prime minister (1964–1967)
- Siaka Stevens, Prime minister (1967)
- David Lansana, Prime minister (1967)
- Ambrose Patrick Genda, Prime minister (1967)
- Andrew Juxon Smith, Prime minister (1967–1968)
- Patrick Conteh, Prime minister (1968–1968)
- Siaka Stevens, Prime minister (1968–1971)

- Republic of Sierra Leone

- Presidents (complete list) –

First Republic
- Christopher Okoro Cole, Acting President (1971)
- Siaka Stevens, President (1971–1985)
- Joseph Saidu Momoh, President (1985–1992)

- Prime Ministers of the First Republic (complete list) –

- Siaka Stevens, Prime minister (1968–1971)
- Sorie Ibrahim Koroma, Prime minister (1971–1975)
- Christian Alusine Kamara-Taylor, Prime minister (1975–1978)
Military regime
- Yahya Kanu, Military Head of State (1992)
- Valentine Strasser, Military Head of State (1992–1996)
- Julius Maada Bio, Military Head of State (1996)
Second Republic
- Ahmad Tejan Kabbah, President (1996–1997)
- Johnny Paul Koroma, Military Head of State (1997–1998)
- Ahmad Tejan Kabbah, President (1998–2007)

Togo

- British Togoland (complete list) –

United Nations Trust Territory, 1946–1956
For details see the United Kingdom under British Isles, Europe

- French Togoland (complete list) –

League of Nations mandate, 1916–1946; United Nations Trust Territory, 1946–1960
For details see France under western Europe

- Togolese Republic

- Presidents (complete list) –

- Sylvanus Olympio, President (1960–1963)
- Emmanuel Bodjollé, Acting President (1963)
- Nicolas Grunitzky, President (1963–1967)
- Kléber Dadjo, Acting President (1967)
- Gnassingbé Eyadéma, President (1967–2005)

- Prime ministers (complete list) –

- Sylvanus Olympio, Prime minister (1960–1961)
- Joseph Kokou Koffigoh, Prime minister (1991–1994)
- Edem Kodjo, Prime minister (1994–1996)
- Kwassi Klutse, Prime minister (1996–1999)
- Eugène Koffi Adoboli, Prime minister (1999–2000)
- Agbéyomé Kodjo, Prime minister (2000–2002)

== Americas ==
=== Americas: Caribbean and Lucayan ===
Antigua and Barbuda

- Territory of Antigua (complete list) –

British territory, 1632–1671, 1958–1962

- Crown Colony of Antigua (complete list) –

British colony, 1962–1967

- Associated State of Antigua (complete list) –

State in free association with the United Kingdom, 1967–1981
For details see the United Kingdom under British Isles, Europe

- Antigua and Barbuda

- Monarchs (complete list) –

- Elizabeth II, Queen (1981–2022)

- Prime ministers (complete list) –

- Vere Bird, Prime minister (1981–1994)
- Lester Bird, Prime minister (1994–2004)

The Bahamas

- Crown Colony of the Bahamas (complete list) –

British colony, 1648–1973
For details see the United Kingdom under British Isles, Europe

- The Bahamas

- Monarchs (complete list) –

- Elizabeth II, Queen (1973–2022)

- Prime ministers (complete list) –

- Lynden Pindling, Prime minister (1973–1992)
- Hubert Ingraham, Prime minister (1992–2002)

Barbados

- Colonial Barbados (complete list) –

British colony, 1627–1966
For details see the United Kingdom under British Isles, Europe

- Barbados

- Monarchs (complete list) –

- Elizabeth II, Queen (1966–2021)

- Prime ministers (complete list) –

- Errol Barrow, Prime minister (1966–1976)
- Tom Adams, Prime minister (1976–1985)
- Harold Bernard St. John, Prime minister (1985–1986)
- Errol Barrow, Prime minister (1986–1987)
- Lloyd Erskine Sandiford, Prime minister (1987–1994)
- Owen Arthur, Prime minister (1994–2008)

Cuba

- Republic of Cuba (1902–1959)

- Presidents (complete list) –

- Carlos Prío Socarrás, President (1948–1952)
- Fulgencio Batista, President (1952–1959)
- Anselmo Alliegro y Milá, Interim President (1959)
- Carlos Manuel Piedra, Interim President (1959)

- Prime ministers (complete list) –

- Félix Lancís Sánchez, Prime minister (1950–1951)
- Óscar Gans, Prime minister (1951–1952)
- Fulgencio Batista, Prime minister (1952)
- Jorge García Montes, Prime minister (1955–1957)
- Andrés Rivero Agüero, Prime minister (1957–1958)
- Emilio Núñez Portuondo, Prime minister (1958)
- Gonzalo Güell, Prime minister (1958–1959)
- José Miró Cardona, Prime minister (1959)

- Republic of Cuba

- Presidents (complete list) –

- Manuel Urrutia Lleó, President (1959)
- Osvaldo Dorticós Torrado, President (1959–1976)
- Fidel Castro, President of the Council of State (1976–2008)

- Prime ministers (complete list) –

- Fidel Castro, Prime minister (1959–1976), President of the Council of Ministers (1976–2008)

Dominica

- British Dominica (complete list) –

British Colony, 1763–1978
For details see the United Kingdom under British Isles, Europe

- Dominica

- Presidents (complete list) –

- Louis Cools-Lartigue, Interim President (1978–1979, 1979)
- Fred Degazon, President (1979–1980)
- Jenner Armour, Acting President (1979–1980)
- Aurelius Marie, President (1980–1983)
- Clarence Seignoret, President (1983–1993)
- Crispin Sorhaindo, President (1993–1998)
- Vernon Shaw, President (1998–2003)

- Prime ministers (complete list) –

- Patrick John, Prime minister (1978–1979)
- Oliver Seraphin, Prime minister (1979–1980)
- Eugenia Charles, Prime minister (1980–1995)
- Edison James, Prime minister (1995–2000)
- Rosie Douglas, Prime minister (2000)
- Pierre Charles, Prime minister (2000–2004)

Dominican Republic

- Third Dominican Republic (complete list) –

- Rafael Trujillo, President (1942–1952)
- Héctor Trujillo, President (1952–1960)
- Joaquín Balaguer, President (1960–1962)

- Armando Óscar Pacheco, Luis Amiama Tió, Antonio Imbert Barrera, Enrique Valdez Vidaurre, Wilfredo Medina Natalio, Huberto Bogaert, Civic-Military Council (1962)

- Rafael Filiberto Bonnelly, President (1962–1963)
- Juan Bosch, President (1963)
- Víctor Elby Viñas Román, Chairman of the Provisional Junta (1963)

- Emilio de los Santos y Salcié, Donald Reid Cabral, Manuel Enrique Tavares Espaillat, Ramón Tapia Espinal, Triumvirate (1963–1965)
- Vinicio Fernández Pérez, Giovanni Gutiérrez Ramírez, Francisco Alberto Caamaño Deñó, Eladio Ramírez Sánchez, Pedro Bartolomé Benoit, Revolutionary Committee (1965)

- Fourth Dominican Republic (complete list) –

- José Rafael Molina Ureña, Provisional President (1965)
- Pedro Bartolomé Benoit, Provisional President (1965)
- Antonio Imbert Barrera, President (1965)
- Héctor García-Godoy, Provisional President (1965–1966)
- Joaquín Balaguer, President (1966–1978)
- Antonio Guzmán Fernández, President (1978–1982)
- Jacobo Majluta Azar, President (1982)
- Salvador Jorge Blanco, President (1982–1986)
- Joaquín Balaguer, President (1986–1996)
- Leonel Fernández, President (1996–2000)
- Hipólito Mejía, President (2000–2004)

Grenada

- Grenada

- Monarchs (complete list) –

- Elizabeth II, Queen (1974–2022)

- Prime ministers (complete list) –

- Eric Gairy, Prime minister (1974–1979)
- Maurice Bishop, de facto Prime minister (1979–1983)
- Bernard Coard, de facto Prime minister (1983)
- Hudson Austin, de facto Prime minister (1983)
- Nicholas Brathwaite, de facto Prime minister (1983–1984)
- Herbert Blaize, Prime minister (1984–1989)
- Ben Jones (Grenada), Prime minister (1989–1990)
- Nicholas Brathwaite, Prime minister (1990–1995)
- George Brizan, Prime minister (1995)
- Keith Mitchell, Prime minister (1995–2008)

Haiti

- Second Haitian Republic

- Heads of state (complete list) –

- Paul Magloire, President (1950–1956)
- Joseph Nemours Pierre-Louis, Provisional President (1956–1957)
- Franck Sylvain, Provisional President (1957)
- Executive Government Council (1957)
- Daniel Fignolé, Provisional President (1957)
- Antonio Thrasybule Kébreau, Chairman of the Military Council (1957)

- Duvalier dynasty, Haiti

- Heads of state (complete list) –

- François Duvalier, President (1957–1964), President for Life (1964–1971)
- Jean-Claude Duvalier, President for Life (1971–1986)

- Third Haitian Republic

- Heads of state (complete list) –

- Henri Namphy, President of the National Council of Government (1986–1988)
- Leslie Manigat, President (1988)
- Henri Namphy, President (1988)
- Prosper Avril, President (1988–1990)
- Hérard Abraham, Acting President (1990)
- Ertha Pascal-Trouillot, Provisional President (1990–1991)
- Jean-Bertrand Aristide, President (1991)
- Raoul Cédras, Acting President (1991)
- Joseph Nérette, Provisional President (1991–1992)
- Marc Bazin, Acting President (1992–1993)
- Jean-Bertrand Aristide, President (1993–1994)
- Émile Jonassaint, Provisional President (1994)
- Jean-Bertrand Aristide, President (1994–1996)
- René Préval, President (1996–2001)

- Prime ministers (complete list) –

- Martial Célestin, Prime minister (1988)
- René Préval, Prime minister (1991)
- Jean-Jacques Honorat, Prime minister (1991–1992)
- Marc Bazin, Prime minister (1992–1993)
- Robert Malval, Prime minister (1993–1994)
- Smarck Michel, Prime minister (1994–1995)
- Claudette Werleigh, Prime minister (1995–1996)
- Rosny Smarth, Prime minister (1996–1997)
- Jacques-Édouard Alexis, Prime minister (1999–2001)

Jamaica

- Jamaica

- Monarchs (complete list) –

- Elizabeth II, Queen (1962–2022)

- Prime ministers (complete list) –

- Alexander Bustamante, Prime minister (1962–1967)
- Donald Sangster, Prime minister (1967)
- Hugh Shearer, Prime minister (1967–1972)
- Michael Manley, Prime minister (1972–1980)
- Edward Seaga, Prime minister (1980–1989)
- Michael Manley, Prime minister (1989–1992)
- P. J. Patterson, Prime minister (1992–2006)

Netherlands Antilles

- Colony of Curaçao and Dependencies (complete list) –

Dutch colony 1634–1828, 1845–1954
For details see the Netherlands under western Europe

- Netherlands Antilles (complete list) –

Constituent country 1954–2010
For details see the Netherlands under western Europe

Saint Kitts and Nevis

- Saint Christopher-Nevis-Anguilla (complete list) –

British colony, 1882–1983
For details see the United Kingdom under British Isles, Europe

- Colonial Saint Kitts and Nevis (complete list) –

British colony, 1882–1983
For details see the United Kingdom under British Isles, Europe

- Saint Kitts and Nevis

- Monarchs (complete list) –

- Elizabeth II, Queen (1983–2022)

- Prime ministers (complete list) –

- Kennedy Simmonds, Prime minister (1983–1995)
- Denzil Douglas, Prime minister (1995–2015)

Saint Lucia

- Colonial Saint Lucia (complete list) –

British colony, 1802–1979
For details see the United Kingdom under British Isles, Europe

- Saint Lucia

- Monarchs (complete list) –

- Elizabeth II, Queen (1979–2022)

- Prime ministers (complete list) –

- John Compton, Prime minister (1979)
- Allan Louisy, Prime minister (1979–1981)
- Winston Cenac, Prime minister (1981–1982)
- Michael Pilgrim, Acting Prime minister (1982)
- John Compton, Prime minister (1982–1996)
- Vaughan Lewis, Prime minister (1996–1997)
- Kenny Anthony, Prime minister (1997–2006)

Saint Vincent and the Grenadines

- Colonial Saint Vincent and the Grenadines (complete list) –

British colony, 1763–1979
For details see the United Kingdom under British Isles, Europe

- Saint Vincent and the Grenadines

- Monarchs (complete list) –

- Elizabeth II, Queen (1979–2022)

- Prime ministers (complete list) –

- Milton Cato, Prime minister (1979–1984)
- James Fitz-Allen Mitchell, Prime minister (1984–2000)
- Arnhim Eustace, Prime minister (2000–2001)

Trinidad and Tobago

- Colonial Trinidad and Tobago (complete list) –

British colony, 1797–1962
For details see the United Kingdom under British Isles, Europe

- Dominion of Trinidad and Tobago

- Monarchs (complete list) –

- Elizabeth II, Queen (1962–1976)

- Prime ministers (complete list) –

- Eric Williams, Prime minister (1962–1981)

- Republic of Trinidad and Tobago

- Presidents (complete list) –

- Ellis Clarke, President (1976–1987)
- Michael J. Williams, Acting President (1987)
- Noor Hassanali, President (1987–1997)
- A. N. R. Robinson, President (1997–2003)

- Prime ministers (complete list) –

- Eric Williams, Prime minister (1962–1981)
- George Chambers, Prime minister (1981–1986)
- A. N. R. Robinson, Prime minister (1986–1991)
- Patrick Manning, Prime minister (1991–1995)
- Basdeo Panday, Prime minister (1995–2001)

=== Americas: Central ===
Belize

- British Honduras/ Colonial Belize (complete list) –

British colony, 1862–1981
For details see the United Kingdom under British Isles, Europe

- Belize

- Monarchs (complete list) –

- Elizabeth II, Queen (1981–2022)

- Prime ministers (complete list) –

- George Cadle Price, Prime minister (1981–1984)
- Manuel Esquivel, Prime minister (1984–1989)
- George Cadle Price, Prime minister (1989–1993)
- Manuel Esquivel, Prime minister (1993–1998)
- Said Musa, Prime minister (1998–2008)

Costa Rica

- Republic of Costa Rica (complete list) –

- Otilio Ulate Blanco, President (1949–1953)
- José Figueres Ferrer, President (1953–1958)
- Mario Echandi Jiménez, President (1958–1962)
- Francisco Orlich Bolmarcich, President (1962–1966)
- José Trejos Fernández, President (1966–1970)
- José Figueres Ferrer, President (1970–1974)
- Daniel Oduber Quirós, President (1974–1978)
- Rodrigo Carazo Odio, President (1978–1982)
- Luis Monge Álvarez, President (1982–1986)
- Óscar Arias, President (1986–1990)
- Rafael Calderón Fournier, President (1990–1994)
- José Figueres Olsen, President (1994–1998)
- Miguel Rodríguez Echeverría, President (1998–2002)

El Salvador

- El Salvador (complete list) –

- Óscar Osorio, President (1950–1956)
- José María Lemus, President (1956–1960)
- Junta of Government, (1960–1961)
- Civic-Military Directory (1961–1962)
- Eusebio Rodolfo Cordón Cea, Provisional President (1962)
- Julio Adalberto Rivera Carballo, President (1962–1967)
- Fidel Sánchez Hernández, President (1967–1972)
- Arturo Armando Molina, President (1972–1977)
- Carlos Humberto Romero, President (1977–1979)

- Revolutionary Government Junta of El Salvador –

- First Junta: Jaime Abdul Gutiérrez, Mario Antonio Andino, Román Mayorga Quirós, Guillermo Ungo, Adolfo Arnoldo Majano (1979–1980)
- Second Junta: Jaime Abdul Gutiérrez, José Ramón Ávalos Navarrete, Adolfo Arnoldo Majano, Héctor Dada Hirezi, José Antonio Morales Ehrlich (1980)
- Third Junta: José Ramón Ávalos Navarrete, Jaime Abdul Gutiérrez, José Napoleón Duarte, José Antonio Morales Ehrlich (1980–1982)

- El Salvador (complete list) –

- Álvaro Magaña, Provisional President (1982–1984)
- José Napoleón Duarte, President (1984–1989)
- Alfredo Cristiani, President (1989–1994)
- Armando Calderón Sol, President (1994–1999)
- Francisco Flores Pérez, President (1999–2004)

Guatemala

- Guatemala (complete list) –

- Juan José Arévalo, President (1945–1951)
- Jacobo Árbenz, President (1951–1954)
- Carlos Enrique Díaz de León, Provisional President (1954)
- Elfego Hernán Monzón Aguirre, Chairman of Military Junta (1954)
- Carlos Castillo Armas, President (1954–1957)
- Luis Arturo González López, Acting President (1957)
- Óscar Mendoza Azurdia, Chairman of Military Junta (1957)
- Guillermo Flores Avendaño, Acting President (1957–1958)
- Miguel Ydígoras Fuentes, President (1958–1963)
- Enrique Peralta Azurdia, President (1963–1966)
- Julio César Méndez Montenegro, President (1966–1970)
- Carlos Manuel Arana Osorio, President (1970–1974)
- Kjell Eugenio Laugerud García, President (1974–1978)
- Fernando Romeo Lucas García, President (1978–1982)
- Efraín Ríos Montt, President (1982–1983)
- Óscar Humberto Mejía Victores, President (1983–1986)
- Vinicio Cerezo, President (1986–1991)
- Jorge Serrano Elías, President (1991–1993)
- Gustavo Adolfo Espina Salguero, President (1993)
- Ramiro de León Carpio, President (1993–1996)
- Álvaro Arzú, President (1996–2000)
- Alfonso Portillo, President (2000–2004)

Honduras

- Honduras (complete list) –

- Juan Manuel Gálvez, President (1949–1954)
- Julio Lozano Díaz, President (1954–1956)
- Military Government Council, President (1956–1957)
- Ramón Villeda Morales, President (1957–1963)
- Oswaldo López Arellano, President (1963–1971)
- Ramón Ernesto Cruz Uclés, President (1971–1972)
- Oswaldo López Arellano, President (1972–1975)
- Juan Alberto Melgar Castro, President (1975–1978)
- Policarpo Paz García, Provisional President (1978–1982)
- Roberto Suazo Córdova, President (1982–1986)
- José Azcona del Hoyo, President (1986–1990)
- Rafael Leonardo Callejas Romero, President (1990–1994)
- Carlos Roberto Reina, President (1994–1998)
- Carlos Roberto Flores, President (1998–2002)

Nicaragua

- Nicaragua (complete list) –

- Anastasio Somoza García, President (1950–1956)
- Luis Somoza Debayle, President (1956–1963)
- René Schick, President (1963–1966)
- Orlando Montenegro Medrano, Acting President (1966)
- Lorenzo Guerrero, President (1966–1967)
- Anastasio Somoza Debayle, President (1967–1972)
- Liberal-Conservative Junta, President (1972–1974)
- Anastasio Somoza Debayle, President (1974–1979)
- Francisco Urcuyo, Acting President (1979)
- Junta of National Reconstruction: Daniel Ortega, Coordinator (1979–1985)
- Daniel Ortega, President (1985–1990)
- Violeta Chamorro, President (1990–1997)
- Arnoldo Alemán, President (1997–2002)

Panama

- Panama (complete list) –

- Presidents (complete list) –

- Arnulfo Arias, President (1949–1951)
- Alcibíades Arosemena, President (1951–1952)
- José Antonio Remón Cantera, President (1952–1955)
- José Ramón Guizado, President (1955)
- Ricardo Arias, President (1955–1956)
- Ernesto de la Guardia, President (1956–1960)
- Roberto Francisco Chiari Remón, President (1960–1964)
- Marco Aurelio Robles, President (1964–1968)
- Arnulfo Arias, President (1968)
- José María Pinilla Fábrega, Bolívar Urrutia Parrilla, Military junta/ Presidents (1968–1969)
- Demetrio B. Lakas, President (1969–1978)
- Arístides Royo, President (1978–1982)
- Ricardo de la Espriella, President (1982–1984)
- Jorge Illueca, President (1984)
- Nicolás Ardito Barletta Vallarino, President (1984–1985)
- Eric Arturo Delvalle, Acting President (1985–1988)
- Manuel Solís Palma, Acting President (1988–1989)
- Francisco Rodríguez, Provisional President (1989)
- Guillermo Endara, President (1989–1994)
- Ernesto Pérez Balladares, President (1994–1999)
- Mireya Moscoso, President (1999–2004)

- Military leaders: de facto Heads of state (1968–1989)

- Omar Torrijos, Military Leader (1968–1981)
- Florencio Flores Aguilar, Military Leader (1981–1982)
- Rubén Darío Paredes, Military Leader (1982–1983)
- Manuel Noriega, Military Leader (1983–1989)

=== Americas: North ===
Canada

- Canada

- Monarchs (complete list) –

- George VI, King (1936–1952)
- Elizabeth II, Queen (1952–2022)

- Prime ministers (complete list) –

- Louis St. Laurent, Prime minister (1948–1957)
- John Diefenbaker, Prime minister (1957–1963)
- Lester B. Pearson, Prime minister (1963–1968)
- Pierre Trudeau, Prime minister (1968–1979)
- Joe Clark, Prime minister (1979–1980)
- Pierre Trudeau, Prime minister (1980–1984)
- John Turner, Prime minister (1984)
- Brian Mulroney, Prime minister (1984–1993)
- Kim Campbell, Prime minister (1993)
- Jean Chrétien, Prime minister (1993–2003)

Mexico

- Mexico (complete list) –

- Miguel Alemán Valdés, President (1946–1952)
- Adolfo Ruiz Cortines, President (1952–1958)
- Adolfo López Mateos, President (1958–1964)
- Gustavo Díaz Ordaz, President (1964–1970)
- Luis Echeverría, President (1970–1976)
- José López Portillo, President (1976–1982)
- Miguel de la Madrid, President (1982–1988)
- Carlos Salinas de Gortari, President (1988–1994)
- Ernesto Zedillo, President (1994–2000)
- Vicente Fox, President (2000–2006)

United States

- United States (complete list)

- Harry S. Truman, President (1945–1953)
- Dwight D. Eisenhower, President (1953–1961)
- John F. Kennedy, President (1961–1963)
- Lyndon B. Johnson, President (1963–1969)
- Richard Nixon, President (1969–1974)
- Gerald Ford, President (1974–1977)
- Jimmy Carter, President (1977–1981)
- Ronald Reagan, President (1981–1989)
- George H. W. Bush, President (1989–1993)
- Bill Clinton, President (1993–2001)

=== Americas: South ===
Argentina

- Argentina (complete list) –

- Juan Perón, President (1946–1955)
- Eduardo Lonardi, de facto President (1955)
- Pedro Eugenio Aramburu, de facto President (1955–1958)
- Arturo Frondizi, President (1958–1962)
- José María Guido, Interim President (1962–1963)
- Arturo Umberto Illia, President (1963–1966)
- Military Junta, (1966)
- Juan Carlos Onganía, de facto President (1966–1970)
- Military Junta, (1970)
- Roberto M. Levingston, de facto President (1970–1971)
- Alejandro A. Lanusse, de facto President (1971–1973)
- Héctor José Cámpora, President (1973)
- Raúl Alberto Lastiri, Interim President (1973)
- Juan Perón, President (1973–1974)
- Isabel Perón, President (1974–1976)
- Jorge Rafael Videla, President of the Military Junta (1976–1981)
- Roberto Eduardo Viola, President of the Military Junta (1981)
- Horacio Tomás Liendo, de facto Acting President (1981)
- Carlos Alberto Lacoste, de facto Interim President (1981)
- Leopoldo Galtieri, de facto President of the Military Junta (1981–1982)
- Alfredo Oscar Saint-Jean, de facto Interim President (1982)
- Reynaldo Bignone, de facto President (1982–1983)
- Raúl Alfonsín, President (1983–1989)
- Carlos Menem, President (1989–1999)
- Fernando de la Rúa, President (1999–2001)

Bolivia

- Bolivia (complete list) –

- Mamerto Urriolagoitía, President (1949–1951)
- Hugo Ballivián, Chairman of the Military Junta (1951–1952)
- Hernán Siles Zuazo, Provisional President (1952)
- Víctor Paz Estenssoro, President (1952–1956)
- Hernán Siles Zuazo, President (1956–1960)
- Víctor Paz Estenssoro, President (1960–1964)
- René Barrientos, Chairman of the Military Junta (1964–1965)
- René Barrientos and Alfredo Ovando Candía, Co-Chairmen of the Military Junta (1965–1966)
- Alfredo Ovando Candía, Chairman of the Military Junta (1966)
- René Barrientos, President (1966–1969)
- Luis Adolfo Siles Salinas, President (1969)
- Alfredo Ovando Candía, President (1969–1970)
- Junta of Commanders of the Armed Forces 1970, Members: Efraín Guachalla Ibáñez, Fernando Sattori Ribera, Alberto Albarracín Crespo (1970)
- Juan José Torres, President (1970–1971)
- Junta of Commanders of the Armed Forces 1971, Members: Andrés Selich Chop (Chairmen), Hugo Banzer, Jaime Florentino Mendieta (1971)
- Hugo Banzer, President (1971–1978)
- Víctor González Fuentes, Chairman of the Military Junta (1978)
- Juan Pereda, President (1978)
- David Padilla, Chairman of the Military Junta (1978–1979)
- Wálter Guevara, Acting President (1979)
- Alberto Natusch, President (1979)
- Lidia Gueiler Tejada, Acting President (1979–1980)
- Junta of Commanders of the Armed Forces 1980, Members: Luis García Meza Tejada, Waldo Bernal Pereira, Ramiro Terrazas Rodríguez (1980)
- Luis García Meza Tejada, President (1980–1981)
- Junta of Commanders of the Armed Forces 1981, Members: Waldo Bernal Pereira, Celso Torrelio, Óscar Jaime Pammo (1981)
- Celso Torrelio, President (1981–1982)
- Junta of Commanders of the Armed Forces 1982, Members: Natalio Morales Mosquera, Óscar Jaime Pammo, Ángel Mariscal Gómez (1982)
- Guido Vildoso, President (1982)
- Hernán Siles Zuazo, President (1982–1985)
- Víctor Paz Estenssoro, President (1985–1989)
- Jaime Paz Zamora, President (1989–1993)
- Gonzalo Sánchez de Lozada, President (1993–1997)
- Hugo Banzer, President (1997–2001)

Brazil

- Second Brazilian Republic (complete list) –

- Eurico Gaspar Dutra, President (1946–1951)
- Getúlio Vargas, President (1951–1954)
- Café Filho, President (1954–1955)
- Carlos Luz, President (1955)
- Nereu Ramos, President (1955–1956)
- Juscelino Kubitschek, President (1956–1961)
- Jânio Quadros, President (1961)
- Ranieri Mazzilli, President (1961)
- João Goulart, President (1961–1964)

- Brazilian Military regime (complete list) –

- Ranieri Mazzilli, President (1964)
- Humberto Castello Branco, President (1964–1967)
- Artur da Costa e Silva, President (1967–1969)
- Military Junta: Augusto Rademaker, Aurélio de Lira Tavares, Márcio Melo, President (1969)
- Emílio Garrastazu Médici, President (1969–1974)
- Ernesto Geisel, President (1974–1979)
- João Figueiredo, President (1979–1985)

- Federative Republic of Brazil (complete list) –

- José Sarney, President (1985–1990)
- Fernando Collor de Mello, President (1990–1992)
- Itamar Franco, President (1992–1995)
- Fernando Henrique Cardoso, President (1995–2003)

Chile

- Presidential Republic (1925–1973) of Chile (complete list) –

- Gabriel González Videla, President (1946–1952)
- Carlos Ibáñez del Campo, President (1952–1958)
- Jorge Alessandri, President (1958–1964)
- Eduardo Frei Montalva, President (1964–1970)
- Salvador Allende, President (1970–1973)

- Military Dictatorship of Chile (1973–1990) (complete list) –

- Augusto Pinochet, President of the Junta (1974–1981), President (1974–1990)
- Jose Toribio Merino, President of the Junta (1981–1990)

- Republic of Chile (complete list) –

- Patricio Aylwin, President (1990–1994)
- Eduardo Frei Ruiz-Tagle, President (1994–2000)
- Ricardo Lagos, President (2000–2006)

Colombia

- Colombia (complete list) –

- Laureano Gómez Castro, President (1950–1953)
- Gustavo Rojas Pinilla, President (1953–1957)
- Military Junta (1957–1958)
- Alberto Lleras Camargo, President (1958–1962)
- Guillermo León Valencia, President (1962–1966)
- Carlos Lleras Restrepo, President (1966–1970)
- Misael Pastrana Borrero, President (1970–1974)
- Alfonso López Michelsen, President (1974–1978)
- Julio César Turbay Ayala, President (1978–1982)
- Belisario Betancur Cuartas, President (1982–1986)
- Virgilio Barco Vargas, President (1986–1990)
- César Gaviria Trujillo, President (1990–1994)
- Ernesto Samper Pizano, President (1994–1998)
- Andrés Pastrana Arango, President (1998–2002)

Ecuador

- Ecuador (complete list) –

- Galo Plaza, President (1948–1952)
- José María Velasco Ibarra, President (1952–1956)
- Camilo Ponce Enríquez, President (1956–1960)
- José María Velasco Ibarra, President (1960–1961)
- C.J. Arosemena Monroy, President (1961–1963)
- Military Junta, Members: Ramón Castro Jijón, Luis Cabrera Sevilla, Guillermo Freile Posso, Marcos Gándara (1963–1966)
- Clemente Yerovi, Acting President (1966)
- Otto Arosemena, Interim President (1966–1967), Constitutional President (1967–1968)
- José María Velasco Ibarra, President (1968–1970), Jéfe Supremo (1970–1972)
- Guillermo Rodríguez Lara, de facto President (1972–1976)
- Supreme Government Council, Alfredo Poveda, Guillermo Durán, Luis Leoro Franco (1976–1979)
- Jaime Roldós Aguilera, President (1979–1981)
- Osvaldo Hurtado, President (1981–1984)
- León Febres Cordero, President (1984–1988)
- Rodrigo Borja Cevallos, President (1988–1992)
- Sixto Durán Ballén, President (1992–1996)
- Abdalá Bucaram, President (1996–1997)
- Fabián Alarcón, Interim President (1997)
- Rosalía Arteaga, Acting President (1997)
- Fabián Alarcón, Interim President (1997–1998)
- Jamil Mahuad, President (1998–2000)
- Gustavo Noboa, President (2000–2003)

Guyana

- British Guiana (complete list) –

British colony, 1814–1966
For details see the United Kingdom under British Isles, Europe

- Guyana (1966–1970)

- Monarch (complete list) –

- Elizabeth II, Queen (1966–1970)

- Prime ministers (complete list) –

- Forbes Burnham, Prime minister (1964–1980)

- Co-operative Republic of Guyana

- Presidents (complete list) –

- Edward Luckhoo, Acting President (1970)
- Arthur Chung, President (1970–1980)
- Forbes Burnham, President (1980–1985)
- Desmond Hoyte, President (1985–1992)
- Cheddi Jagan, President (1992–1997)
- Sam Hinds, President (1997)
- Janet Jagan, President (1997–1999)
- Bharrat Jagdeo, President (1999–2011)

- Prime ministers (complete list) –

- Forbes Burnham, Prime minister (1964–1980)
- Ptolemy Reid, Prime minister (1980–1984)
- Desmond Hoyte, Prime minister (1984–1985)
- Hamilton Green, Prime minister (1985–1992)
- Sam Hinds, Prime minister (1992–1997)
- Janet Jagan, Prime minister (1997)
- Sam Hinds, Prime minister (1997–1999)
- Bharrat Jagdeo, Prime minister (1999)
- Sam Hinds, Prime minister (1999–2015)

Paraguay

- Republic of Paraguay (complete list) –

- Federico Chávez, President (1949–1954)
- Tomás Romero, President (1954)

- El Stronato: Paraguay (complete list) –

- Alfredo Stroessner, President (1954–1989)

- Republic of Paraguay (complete list) –

- Andrés Rodríguez, President (1989–1993)
- Juan Carlos Wasmosy, President (1993–1998)
- Raúl Cubas, President (1998–1999)
- Luis González, President (1999–2003)

Peru

- Republic of Peru (complete list) –

- Manuel A. Odría, Constitutional President (1950–1956)
- Manuel Prado y Ugarteche, Constitutional President (1956–1962)
- Ricardo Pérez Godoy, President of the Military Junta (1962–1963)
- Nicolás Lindley López, President of the Military Junta (1963)
- Fernando Belaúnde Terry, Constitutional President (1963–1968)

- Military Junta of Peru –

- Juan Velasco Alvarado, President of the Revolutionary Government of the Armed Forces (1968–1975)
- Francisco Morales Bermúdez, President of the Revolutionary Government of the Armed Forces (1975–1980)

- Republic of Peru

- Presidents (complete list) –

- Fernando Belaúnde Terry, Constitutional President (1980–1985)
- Alan García Pérez, Constitutional President (1985–1990)
- Alberto Fujimori, Constitutional President (1990–1992), de facto President (1992–1995), Constitutional President (1995–2000)
- Valentín Paniagua, President of Transition Government (2000–2001)

- Prime ministers (complete list) –

- Zenón Noriega Agüero, Prime Minister (1950–1954)
- Roque Augusto Saldías Maninat, Prime Minister (1954–1956)
- Manuel Cisneros Sánchez, Prime Minister (1956–1958)
- Luis Gallo Porras, Prime Minister (1958–1959)
- Pedro Beltrán Espantoso, Prime Minister (1959–1961)
- Carlos Moreyra y Paz Soldán, Prime Minister (1961–1962)
- Nicolás Lindley López, Prime Minister (1962–1963)
- Julio Óscar Trelles Montes, Prime Minister (1963)
- Fernando Schwalb López Aldana, Prime Minister (1963–1965)
- Daniel Becerra de la Flor, Prime Minister (1965–1967)
- Edgardo Seoane Corrales, Prime Minister (1967)
- Raúl Ferrero Rebagliati, Prime Minister (1967–1968)
- Oswaldo Hercelles García, Prime Minister (1968)
- Miguel Mujica Gallo, Prime Minister (1968)
- Ernesto Montagne Sánchez, Prime Minister (1968–1973)
- Luis Edgardo Mercado Jarrín, Prime Minister (1973–1975)
- Francisco Morales-Bermúdez, Prime Minister (1975)
- Óscar Vargas Prieto, Prime Minister (1975–1976)
- Jorge Fernández Maldonado Solari, Prime Minister (1976)
- Guillermo Arbulú Galliani, Prime Minister (1976–1978)
- Óscar Molina Pallochia, Prime Minister (1978–1979)
- Pedro Richter Prada, Prime Minister (1979–1980)
- Manuel Ulloa Elías, Prime Minister (1980–1983)
- Fernando Schwalb López Aldana, Prime Minister (1983–1984)
- Sandro Mariátegui Chiappe, Prime Minister (1984)
- Luis Pércovich Roca, Prime Minister (1984–1985)
- Luis Alva Castro, Prime Minister (1985–1987)
- Guillermo Larco Cox, Prime Minister (1987–1988)
- Armando Villanueva del Campo, Prime Minister (1988–1989)
- Luis Alberto Sánchez, Prime Minister (1989)
- Guillermo Larco Cox, Prime Minister (1989–1990)
- Juan Carlos Hurtado Miller, Prime Minister (1990–1991)
- Carlos Torres y Torres Lara, Prime Minister (1991)
- Alfonso de Los Heros, Prime Minister (1991–1992)
- Oscar De La Puente, Prime Minister (1992–1993)
- Alfonso Bustamante, Prime Minister (1993–1994)
- Efrain Goldenberg, Prime Minister (1994–1995)
- Dante Cordova, Prime Minister (1995–1996)
- Alberto Pandolfi, Prime Minister (1996–1998)
- Javier Valle Riestra, Prime Minister (1998)
- Alberto Pandolfi, Prime Minister (1998–1999)
- Víctor Joy Way, Prime Minister (1999)
- Alberto Bustamante Belaúnde, Prime Minister (1999–2000)
- Federico Salas, Prime Minister (2000)
- Javier Pérez de Cuéllar, Prime Minister (2000–2001)

Suriname

- Dutch Surinam (complete list) –

Dutch colony 1667–1954
For details see the Netherlands under western Europe

- Suriname (Kingdom of the Netherlands) (complete list) –

Constituent country 1954–1975
For details see the Netherlands under western Europe
- Prime ministers (complete list) –

- Archibald Currie, Prime minister (1954–1955)
- Johan Ferrier, Prime minister (1955–1958)
- Severinus Desiré Emanuels, Prime minister (1958–1963)
- Johan Adolf Pengel, Prime minister (1963–1969)
- Arthur Johan May, Acting Prime minister (1969)
- Jules Sedney, Prime minister (1969–1973)
- Henck Arron, Prime minister (1973–1980)

- Republic of Suriname

- Presidents (complete list) –

- Johan Ferrier, President (1973–1980)
- Henk Chin A Sen, President (1980–1982)
- Fred Ramdat Misier, President (1982–1988)
- Ramsewak Shankar, President (1988–1990)
- Ivan Graanoogst, Acting President (1990)
- Johan Kraag, President (1990–1991)
- Ronald Venetiaan, President (1991–1996)
- Jules Wijdenbosch, President (1996–2000)
- Ronald Venetiaan, President (2000–2010)

- Prime ministers (complete list) –

- Henck Arron, Prime minister (1975–1980)
- Henk Chin A Sen, Prime minister (1980–1982)
- Henry Roëll Neijhorst, Prime minister (1982)
- Liakat Ali Errol Alibux, Prime minister (1983–1984)
- Willem Alfred Udenhout, Prime minister (1984–1986)
- Pretaap Radhakishun, Prime minister (1986–1987)
- Jules Wijdenbosch, Prime minister (1987–1988)

Uruguay

- Uruguay (complete list) –

- Luis Batlle Berres, President (1947–1951)
- Andrés Martínez Trueba, President (1951–1955)
- Luis Batlle Berres, President (National Council of Government) (1955–1956)
- Alberto Fermín Zubiría, President (National Council of Government) (1956–1957)
- Arturo Lezama, President (National Council of Government) (1957–1958)
- Carlos Fischer, President (National Council of Government) (1958–1959)
- Martín Echegoyen, President (National Council of Government) (1959–1960)
- Benito Nardone, President (National Council of Government) (1960–1961)
- Eduardo Víctor Haedo, President (National Council of Government) (1961–1962)
- Faustino Harrison, President (National Council of Government) (1962–1963)
- Daniel Fernández Crespo, President (National Council of Government) (1963–1964)
- Luis Giannattasio, President (National Council of Government) (1964–1965)
- Washington Beltrán, President (National Council of Government) (1965–1966)
- Alberto Héber Usher, President (National Council of Government) (1966–1967)
- Óscar Diego Gestido, President (1967)
- Jorge Pacheco Areco, President (1967–1972)
- Juan María Bordaberry, President (1972–1976)

- Civic-Military Dictatorship of Uruguay (complete list) –

- Juan María Bordaberry, President (1972–1976)
- Alberto Demicheli, Acting President (1976)
- Aparicio Méndez, Acting President (1976–1981)
- Gregorio Conrado Álvarez, Acting President (1981–1985)

- Oriental Republic of Uruguay (complete list) –

- Rafael Addiego Bruno, Acting President (1985)
- Julio María Sanguinetti, President (1985–1990)
- Luis Alberto Lacalle, President (1990–1995)
- Julio María Sanguinetti, President (1995–2000)
- Jorge Batlle, President (2000–2005)

Venezuela

- United States of Venezuela (complete list) –

- Germán Suárez Flamerich, Interim President (1950–1952)
- Marcos Pérez Jiménez, Provisional President (1952–1953), President (1953–1958)

- Republic of Venezuela (complete list) –

- Marcos Pérez Jiménez, Provisional President (1952–1953), President (1953–1958)
- Wolfgang Larrazábal, President (1958)
- Edgar Sanabria, Interim President (1958–1959)
- Rómulo Betancourt, President (1959–1964)
- Raúl Leoni, President (1964–1969)
- Rafael Caldera, President (1969–1974)
- Carlos Andrés Pérez, President (1974–1979)
- Luis Herrera Campins, President (1979–1984)
- Jaime Lusinchi, President (1984–1989)
- Carlos Andrés Pérez, President (1989–1993)
- Octavio Lepage, Acting President (1993)
- Ramón José Velásquez, Interim President (1993–1994)
- Rafael Caldera, President (1994–1999)

- Bolivarian Republic of Venezuela (complete list) –

- Hugo Chávez, President (1999–2002, 2002–2013)

== Asia ==
=== Asia: Central ===
- Kazakhstan

- Presidents (complete list) –

- Nursultan Nazarbayev, President (1991–2019)

- Prime ministers (complete list) –

- Sergey Tereshchenko, Prime minister (1991–1994)
- Akejan Kajegeldin, Prime minister (1994–1997)
- Nurlan Balgimbayev, Prime minister (1997–1999)
- Kassym-Jomart Tokayev, Prime minister (1999–2002)

- Kyrgyzstan

- Presidents (complete list) –

- Askar Akayev, President (1990–2005)

- Prime ministers (complete list) –

- Nasirdin Isanov, Prime minister (1991)
- Andrei Iordan, Acting Prime minister (1991–1992)
- Tursunbek Chyngyshev, Prime minister (1992–1993)
- Almanbet Matubraimov, Acting Prime minister (1993)
- Apas Jumagulov, Prime minister (1993–1998)
- Kubanychbek Jumaliyev, Acting Prime minister (1998)
- Boris Silayev, Acting Prime minister (1998)
- Jumabek Ibraimov, Prime minister (1998–1999)
- Boris Silayev, Acting Prime minister (1999)
- Amangeldy Muraliyev, Prime minister (1999–2000)
- Kurmanbek Bakiyev, Prime minister (2000–2002)

- Tajikistan

- Presidents (complete list) –

- Qadriddin Aslonov, Acting President (1991)
- Rahmon Nabiyev, President (1991)
- Akbarsho Iskandarov, Acting President (1991, 1992)
- Rahmon Nabiyev, President (1991–1992)
- Emomali Rahmon, Chairman of the Supreme Assembly (1992–1994), President (1994–present)

- Prime ministers (complete list) –

- Izatullo Khayoyev, Prime minister (1991–1992)
- Akbar Mirzoyev, Prime minister (1992)
- Abdumalik Abdullajanov, Prime minister (1992–1993)
- Abdujalil Samadov, Prime minister (1993–1994)
- Jamshed Karimov, Prime minister (1994–1996)
- Yahyo Azimov, Prime minister (1996–1999)
- Oqil Oqilov, Prime minister (1999–2013)

- Tibet (complete list) –

- Tenzin Gyatso, 14th Dalai Lama (1950–1959)

- Turkmenistan (complete list) –

- President (complete list) –

- Saparmurat Niyazov, President (1990–2006)

- Prime ministers (complete list) –

- Han Ahmedow, Prime minister (1989/1991–1992)

- Uzbekistan

- Presidents (complete list) –

- Islam Karimov, President (1991–2016)

- Prime ministers (complete list) –

- Abdulhashim Mutalov, Prime minister (1992–1995)
- Utkir Tukhtamurodovich Sultonov, Prime minister (1995–2003)

=== Asia: East ===
- Republic of China: Taiwan

- Presidents (complete list) –

- Chiang Kai-shek, President (1950–1975)
- Yen Chia-kan, President (1975–1978)
- Chiang Ching-kuo, President (1978–1988)
- Lee Teng-hui, President (1988–2000)
- Chen Shui-bian, President (2000–2008)

- Premiers (complete list) –

- Chen Cheng, Premier (1950–1954, 1958–1963)
- Yu Hung-chun, Premier (1954–1958)
- Wang Yun-wu, Acting Premier (1963)
- Yen Chia-kan, Premier (1963–1972)
- Chiang Ching-kuo, Premier (1972–1978)
- Hsu Ching-chung, Acting Premier (1978)
- Sun Yun-suan, Premier (1978–1984)
- Yu Kuo-hwa, Premier (1984–1989)
- Lee Huan, Premier (1989–1990)
- Hau Pei-tsun, Premier (1990–1993)
- Lien Chan, Premier (1993–1997)
- Vincent Siew, Premier (1997–2000)
- Tang Fei, Premier (2000)
- Chang Chun-hsiung, Premier (2000–2002)

- People's Republic of China

- Chairmen and General Secretaries of the Communist Party (complete list) and paramount leaders (complete list) –

- Mao Zedong, Chairman (1945–1976), Paramount Leader (1949–1976)
- Hua Guofeng, Chairman (1976–1981), Paramount Leader (1976–1978)
- Deng Xiaoping, Paramount Leader (1978–1989)
- Hu Yaobang, Chairman (1981–1982), General Secretary (1982–1987)
- Zhao Ziyang, General Secretary (1987–1989)
- Jiang Zemin, General Secretary (1989–2002), Paramount Leader (1989–2002)

- Heads of state (complete list) –

- Mao Zedong, Chairman (1949–1959)
- Liu Shaoqi, President (1959–1968)
- Soong Ching-ling, Acting President (1968–1972), Acting NPC Standing Committee Chairwoman (1976–1978)
- Dong Biwu, Acting President (1968–1975)
- Zhu De, NPC Standing Committee Chairman (1975–1976)
- Ye Jianying, NPC Standing Committee Chairman (1978–1983)
- Li Xiannian, President (1983–1988)
- Yang Shangkun, President (1988–1993)
- Jiang Zemin, President (1993–2003)

- Premiers (complete list) –

- Zhou Enlai, Premier (1949–1976)
- Hua Guofeng, Premier (1976–1980)
- Zhao Ziyang, Premier (1980–1988)
- Li Peng, Premier (1988–1998)
- Zhu Rongji, Premier (1998–2003)

- Japan

- Emperors (complete list) –

- Hirohito, Emperor (1926–1989)
- Akihito, Emperor (1989–2019)

- Prime ministers (complete list) –

- Ichirō Hatoyama, Prime minister (1954–1955)
- Tanzan Ishibashi, Prime minister (1956–1957)
- Nobusuke Kishi, Prime minister (1957–1958)
- Hayato Ikeda, Prime minister (1960)
- Eisaku Satō, Prime minister (1964–1967)
- Kakuei Tanaka, Prime minister (1972)
- Takeo Miki, Prime minister (1974–1976)
- Takeo Fukuda, Prime minister (1976–1978)
- Masayoshi Ōhira, Prime minister (1978–1980)
- Masayoshi Ito, Acting Prime minister (1980)
- Zenko Suzuki, Prime minister (1980–1982)
- Yasuhiro Nakasone, Prime minister (1982–1983)
- Noboru Takeshita, Prime minister (1987–1989)
- Sōsuke Uno, Prime minister (1989)
- Toshiki Kaifu, Prime minister (1989–1990)
- Kiichi Miyazawa, Prime minister (1991–1993)
- Morihiro Hosokawa, Prime minister (1993–1994)
- Tsutomu Hata, Prime minister (1994)
- Tomiichi Murayama, Prime minister (1994–1996)
- Ryutaro Hashimoto, Prime minister (1996)
- Keizō Obuchi, Prime minister (1998–2000)
- Mikio Aoki, Acting Prime minister (2000)
- Yoshirō Mori, Prime minister (2000–2001)

- North Korea

- General Secretary of the Workers' Party (complete list) –

- Kim Il Sung, Chairman (1949–1966), General Secretary (1966–1994)
- Kim Jong Il, General Secretary (1997–2011)

- President (complete list) –

- Kim Il Sung, President (1972–1994)

- Premiers (complete list) –

- Kim Il Sung, Premier (1949–1972)
- Kim Il, Premier (1972–1976)
- Pak Song-chol, Premier (1976–1977)
- Ri Jong-ok, Premier (1977–1984)
- Kang Song-san, Premier (1984–1986)
- Ri Kun-mo, Premier (1986–1988)
- Yon Hyong-muk, Premier (1989–1992)
- Kang Song-san, Premier (1992–1997)
- Hong Song-nam, Premier (1997–2003)

- South Korea

- Presidents (complete list) –

- Syngman Rhee, President (1948–1960)
- Yun Po-sun, President (1960–1962)
- Park Chung Hee, Acting President (1962–1963), President (1963–1979)
- Choi Kyu-hah, President (1979–1980)
- Chun Doo-hwan, President (1980–1988)
- Roh Tae-woo, President (1988–1993)
- Kim Young-sam, President (1993–1998)
- Kim Dae-jung, President (1998–2003)

- Prime ministers (complete list) –

- Chang Myon, Prime minister (1950–1952)
- Ho Chong, Acting Prime minister (1952)
- Yi Yun-yong, Acting Prime minister (1952), Prime minister (1960)
- Chang Taek-sang, Prime minister (1952)
- Paik Too-chin, Acting Prime minister (1952–1953), Prime minister (1953–1954)
- Pyon Yong-tae, Prime minister (1954)
- Paek Han-song, Acting Prime minister (1954)
- Chang Myon, Prime minister (1960–1961)
- Jang Do-young, Prime minister (1961)
- Song Yo-chan, Prime minister (1961–1962)
- Park Chung-hee, Prime minister (1962)
- Kim Hyun-chul, Prime minister (1962–1963)
- Choi Tu-son, Prime minister (1963–1964)
- Chung Il-kwon, Prime minister (1964–1970)
- Paik Too-chin, Prime minister (1970–1971)
- Kim Jong-pil, Prime minister (1971–1975)
- Choi Kyu-hah, Acting Prime minister (1975–1976), Prime minister (1976–1979)
- Shin Hyun-hwak, Prime minister (1979–1980)
- Pak Choong-hoon, Acting Prime minister (1980)
- Nam Duck-woo, Prime minister (1980–1982)
- Yoo Chang-soon, Prime minister (1982)
- Kim Sang-hyup, Prime minister (1982–1983)
- Chin Iee-chong, Prime minister (1983–1984)
- Shin Byung-hyun, Acting Prime minister (1984–1985)
- Lho Shin-yong, Prime minister (1985–1987)
- Lee Han-key, Acting Prime minister (1987)
- Kim Chung-yul, Prime minister (1987–1988)
- Lee Hyun-jae, Prime minister (1988)
- Kang Young-hoon, Prime minister (1988–1990)
- Ro Jai-bong, Acting Prime minister (1990–1991), Prime minister (1991)
- Chung Won-shik, Prime minister (1991–1992)
- Hyun Soong-jong, Prime minister (1992–1993)
- Hwang In-sung, Prime minister (1993)
- Lee Hoi-chang, Prime minister (1993–1994)
- Lee Yung-dug, Prime minister (1994)
- Lee Hong-koo, Prime minister (1994–1995)
- Lee Soo-sung, Prime minister (1995–1997)
- Goh Kun, Prime minister (1997–1998)
- Kim Jong-pil, Prime minister (1998–2000)
- Park Tae-joon, Prime minister (2000)
- Lee Han-dong, Prime minister (2000–2002)

- Mongolian People's Republic

- Heads of state (complete list) –

- Gonchigiin Bumtsend, Chairman (1940–1953)
- Sükhbaataryn Yanjmaa, Acting Chairwoman (1953–1954)
- Jamsrangiin Sambuu, Chairman (1954–1972)
- Tsagaanlamyn Dügersüren, Acting Chairman (1972)
- Sonomyn Luvsan, Acting Chairman (1972–1974)
- Yumjaagiin Tsedenbal, Chairman (1974–1984)
- Nyamyn Jagvaral, Acting Chairman (1984)
- Jambyn Batmönkh, Chairman (1984–1990)
- Punsalmaagiin Ochirbat, Chairman (1990–1992), President (1990–1992)

- Prime ministers (complete list) –

- Khorloogiin Choibalsan, Prime minister (1939–1952)
- Yumjaagiin Tsedenbal, Prime minister (1952–1974)
- Jambyn Batmönkh, Prime minister (1974–1984)
- Dumaagiin Sodnom, Prime minister (1984–1990)
- Sharavyn Gungaadorj, Prime minister (1990)
- Dashiin Byambasüren, Prime minister (1990–1992)

- Mongolia

- Presidents (complete list) –

- Punsalmaagiin Ochirbat, President (1992–1997)
- Natsagiin Bagabandi, President (1997–2005)

- Prime ministers (complete list) –

- Puntsagiin Jasrai, Prime minister (1992–1996)
- Mendsaikhany Enkhsaikhan, Prime minister (1996–1998)
- Tsakhiagiin Elbegdorj, Prime minister (1998)
- Janlavyn Narantsatsralt, Prime minister (1998–1999)
- Nyam-Osoryn Tuyaa, Acting Prime minister (1999)
- Rinchinnyamyn Amarjargal, Prime minister (1999–2000)
- Nambaryn Enkhbayar, Prime minister (2000–2004)

=== Asia: Southeast ===
Brunei

- Protectorate of Brunei / Nation of Brunei (complete list) –

British protectorate, 1888–1984
- Omar Ali Saifuddien III, Sultan (1950–1967)
- Hassanal Bolkiah, Sultan (1967–present)

Cambodia

- Kingdom of Cambodia (1953–1970)

- Kings (complete list) –

- Norodom Sihanouk, King (1941–1955), Prince (1960–1970)
- Norodom Suramarit, King (1955–1960)
- Chuop Hell, Acting Head of state (1960)
- Sisowath Monireth, Acting Head of state (1960)
- Chuop Hell, Acting Head of state (1960)
- Sisowath Kossamak, Queen Mother (1960–1970)

- Prime ministers (complete list) –

- Penn Nouth, Prime minister (1953, 1954–1955, 1958, 1961, 1968–1969)
- Chan Nak, Prime minister (1953–1954)
- Leng Ngeth, Prime minister (1955)
- Oum Chheang Sun, Prime minister (1956)
- Khim Tit, Prime minister (1956)
- Sam Yun, Prime minister (1956–1957)
- Sim Var, Prime minister (1957–1958)
- Ek Yi Oun, Prime minister (1958)
- Pho Proeung, Prime minister (1960–1961)
- Nhiek Tioulong, Prime minister (1962)
- Chau Sen Cocsal Chhum, Prime minister (1962)
- Norodom Kantol, Prime minister (1962–1966)
- Lon Nol, Prime minister (1966–1967, 1969–1970)
- Son Sann, Prime minister (1967–1968)

- Khmer Republic

- Presidents (complete list) –

- Cheng Heng, President (1970–1972)
- Lon Nol, President (1972–1975)
- Peter Khoy Saukam, Acting President (1975)
- Sak Sutsakhan, Chairman of the Supreme Committee (1975)

- Prime ministers (complete list) –

- Lon Nol, Prime minister (1970–1971)
- Sisowath Sirik Matak, Prime minister (1971–1972)
- Son Ngoc Thanh, Prime minister (1972)
- Hang Thun Hak, Prime minister (1972–1973)
- In Tam, Prime minister (1973)
- Long Boret, Prime minister (1973–1975)

- Democratic Kampuchea

- General Secretary of the Communist Party (complete list) –

- Pol Pot, General Secretary (1963–1981)

- Heads of state (complete list) –

- Norodom Sihanouk, President of the State Presidium (1975–1976)
- Khieu Samphan, President of the State Presidium (1976–1979)

- Prime ministers (complete list) –

- Penn Nouth, Prime minister (1975–1976)
- Khieu Samphan, Prime minister (1976)
- Nuon Chea, Prime minister (1976)
- Pol Pot, Prime minister (1976, 1976–1979)

- People's Republic of Kampuchea

- General Secretary (complete list) –

- Pen Sovan, General Secretary (1979–1981)
- Heng Samrin, General Secretary (1981–1991)

- Heads of state (complete list) –

- Heng Samrin, Chairman of the Revolutionary Council (1979–1981), Chairman of the State Council (1981–1992)

- Prime ministers (complete list) –

- Pen Sovan, Prime minister (1981)
- Chan Sy, Prime minister (1982–1984)
- Hun Sen, Prime minister (1985–1989)

- United Nations Transitional Authority in Cambodia –

United Nations protectorate, 1992–1993

- State of Cambodia

- General Secretary (complete list) –

- Heng Samrin, General Secretary (1981–1991)

- Heads of state (complete list) –

- Heng Samrin, Chairman of the State Council (1981–1992)
- Chea Sim, Chairman of the State Council (1992–1993)
- Norodom Sihanouk, Head of state (1993)

- Prime ministers (complete list) –

- Hun Sen, Prime minister (1989–1993), Second Prime minister (1993)
- Norodom Ranariddh, First Prime minister (1993)

- Kingdom of Cambodia

- Kings (complete list) –

- Norodom Sihanouk, King (1993–2004)

- Prime ministers (complete list) –

- Norodom Ranariddh, First Prime minister (1993–1997)
- Hun Sen, Second Prime minister (1993–1998, Prime minister (1998–2023)
- Ung Huot, First Prime minister (1997–1998)

East Timor

- East Timor (independent 2002–present) (complete list) –

- Francisco Xavier do Amaral, President (1975)
- Nicolau dos Reis Lobato, Acting President (1975–1978)

- United Nations Transitional Administration in East Timor

United Nations protectorate, 1999–2002

Indonesia

- Liberal democracy period in Indonesia

- Presidents (complete list) –

- Sukarno, President (1945–1967)

- Prime ministers (complete list) –

- Mohammad Natsir, Prime minister (1950–1951)
- Soekiman Wirjosandjojo, Prime minister (1951–1952)
- Wilopo, Prime minister (1952–1953)
- Ali Sastroamidjojo, Prime minister (1953–1955, 1956–1957)
- Burhanuddin Harahap, Prime minister (1955–1956)
- Djuanda Kartawidjaja, Prime minister (1957–1959)

- Guided Democracy in Indonesia (complete list) –

- Sukarno, President (1945–1967)

- New Order, Indonesia (complete list) –

- Suharto, Acting President (1967–1968), President (1968–1998)

- Republic of Indonesia (complete list) –

- B. J. Habibie, President (1998–1999)
- Abdurrahman Wahid, President (1999–2001)

- United Nations Temporary Executive Authority –

United Nations protectorate, 1962–1963

- Republic of South Maluku –

- Chris Soumokil, President (1950–1966)

Laos

- Kingdom of Laos

- Monarchs (complete list) –

- Sisavang Vong, King (1946–1959)
- Sisavang Vatthana, King (1959–1975)

- Prime ministers (complete list) –

- Phoui Sananikone, Prime minister (1950–1951)
- Savang Vatthana, Prime minister (1951)
- Souvanna Phouma, Prime minister (1951–1954, 1956–1958, 1960, 1962–1975)
- Katay Don Sasorith, Prime minister (1954–1956)
- Phoui Sananikone, Prime minister (1958–1959)
- Sounthone Pathammavong, Prime minister (1959–1960)
- Kou Abhay, Prime minister (1960)
- Somsanith Vongkotrattana, Prime minister (1960)
- Boun Oum, Prime minister (1960–1962)
- Souvanna Phouma, Prime minister (1962–1975)

- Lao People's Democratic Republic

- General Secretaries (complete list) –

- Kaysone Phomvihane, General Secretary (1955–1991), Chairman (1991–1992)
- Khamtai Siphandone, Chairman (1992–2006)

- Presidents (complete list) –

- Souphanouvong, President (1975–1991)
- Phoumi Vongvichit, Acting President (1986–1991)
- Kaysone Phomvihane, President (1991–1992)
- Nouhak Phoumsavanh, President (1992–1998)
- Khamtai Siphandone, President (1998–2006)

- Prime ministers (complete list) –

- Kaysone Phomvihane, Prime minister (1975–1991)
- Khamtai Siphandone, Prime minister (1991–1998)
- Sisavath Keobounphanh, Prime minister (1998–2001)

Malaysia

- Malaysia

- Elected monarchs (complete list) –

- Abdul Rahman of Negeri Sembilan, Yang di-Pertuan Agong (1957–1960)
- Hisamuddin of Selangor, Yang di-Pertuan Agong (1960)
- Putra of Perlis, Yang di-Pertuan Agong (1960–1965)
- Ismail Nasiruddin of Terengganu, Yang di-Pertuan Agong (1965–1970)
- Abdul Halim of Kedah, Yang di-Pertuan Agong (1970–1975)
- Yahya Petra of Kelantan, Yang di-Pertuan Agong (1975–1979)
- Ahmad Shah of Pahang, Yang di-Pertuan Agong (1979–1984)
- Iskandar of Johor, Yang di-Pertuan Agong (1984–1989)
- Azlan Shah of Perak, Yang di-Pertuan Agong (1989–1994)
- Ja'afar of Negeri Sembilan, Yang di-Pertuan Agong (1994–1999)
- Salahuddin of Selangor, Yang di-Pertuan Agong (1999–2001)

- Prime ministers (complete list) –

- Tunku Abdul Rahman, Prime minister (1957–1970)
- Abdul Razak Hussein, Prime minister (1970–1976)
- Hussein Onn, Prime minister (1976–1981)
- Mahathir Mohamad, Prime minister (1981–2003)

Myanmar / Burma

- Union of Burma

- Presidents (complete list) –

- Sao Shwe Thaik, President (1948–1952)
- Ba U, President (1952–1957)
- Win Maung, President (1957–1962)
- Ne Win, Chairman of the Revolutionary Council (1962–1974)

- Prime ministers (complete list) –

- U Nu, Prime minister (1948–1956, 1957–1958, 1960–1962)
- Ba Swe, Prime minister (1956–1957)
- Ne Win, Prime minister (1958–1960, 1962–1974)

- Socialist Republic of the Union of Burma

- Party Chairman (complete list) –

- Ne Win, Chairman (1962–1988)
- Sein Lwin, Chairman (1988)
- Maung Maung, Chairman (1988)

- Presidents (complete list) –

- Ne Win, President (1974–1981)
- San Yu, President (1981–1988)
- Sein Lwin, President (1988)
- Aye Ko, Acting President (1988)
- Maung Maung, Acting President (1988)

- Prime ministers (complete list) –

- Sein Win, Prime minister (1974–1977)
- Maung Maung Kha, Prime minister (1977–1988)
- Tun Tin, Prime minister (1988)

- Union of Burma/Myanmar

- Heads of state (complete list) –

- Saw Maung, Chairmen (1988–1992)
- Than Shwe, Chairmen (1992–2011)

- Prime ministers (complete list) –

- Saw Maung, Prime minister (1988–1992)
- Than Shwe, Prime minister (1992–2003)

Philippines

- Philippines

- Presidents (complete list) –

Third Philippine Republic
- Elpidio Quirino, President (1948–1953)
- Ramon Magsaysay, President (1953–1957)
- Carlos P. Garcia, President (1957–1961)
- Diosdado Macapagal, President (1961–1965)
Fourth Philippine Republic
- Ferdinand Marcos, President (1965–1986)
Fifth Philippine Republic
- Corazon Aquino, President (1986–1992)
- Fidel V. Ramos, President (1992–1998)
- Joseph Estrada, President (1998–2001)

- Prime ministers (complete list) –

Fourth Philippine Republic
- Ferdinand Marcos, Prime minister (1978–1981)
- Cesar Virata, Prime minister (1981–1986)
- Salvador Laurel, Prime minister (1986)

Singapore

- Singapore

- Presidents (complete list) –

- Yusof Ishak, President (1965–1970)
- Benjamin Sheares, President (1970–1981)
- Devan Nair, President (1981–1985)
- Wee Kim Wee, President (1985–1993)
- Ong Teng Cheong, President (1993–1999)
- S. R. Nathan, President (1999–2011)

- Prime ministers (complete list) –

- Lee Kuan Yew, Prime minister (1959–1990)
- Goh Chok Tong, Prime minister (1990–2004)

Thailand

- Thailand

- Monarchs (complete list) –

- Bhumibol Adulyadej, King (1946–2016)

- Prime ministers (complete list) –

- Plaek Phibunsongkhram, Prime minister (1948–1957)
- Pote Sarasin, Prime minister (1957–1958)
- Thanom Kittikachorn, Prime minister (1958)
- Sarit Thanarat, Prime minister (1957, 1958–1963)
- Thanom Kittikachorn, Prime minister (1963–1973)
- Sanya Dharmasakti, Prime minister (1973–1975)
- Seni Pramoj, Prime minister (1975)
- Kukrit Pramoj, Prime minister (1975–1976)
- Seni Pramoj, Prime minister (1976)
- Thanin Kraivichien, Prime minister (1976–1977)
- Kriangsak Chamanan, Prime minister (1977–1980)
- Prem Tinsulanonda, Prime minister (1980–1988)
- Chatichai Choonhavan, Prime minister (1988–1991)
- Anand Panyarachun, Prime minister (1991–1992)
- Suchinda Kraprayoon, Prime minister (1992)
- Meechai Ruchuphan, Acting Prime minister (1992)
- Anand Panyarachun, Prime minister (1992)
- Chuan Leekpai, Prime minister (1992–1995)
- Banharn Silpa-archa, Prime minister (1995–1996)
- Chavalit Yongchaiyudh, Prime minister (1996–1997)
- Chuan Leekpai, Prime minister (1997–2001)

Vietnam

- Democratic Republic of Vietnam (North Vietnam) (1945–1976)

- General Secretaries of the Communist Party

- Trường Chinh, General Secretary (1941–1956)
- Ho Chi Minh, First Secretary (1956-1960), Chairman (1951–1969)
- Lê Duẩn, First Secretary (1960-1986)

- Presidents (complete list) –

- Ho Chi Minh, President (1945–1969)
- Tôn Đức Thắng, President (1969–1976)

- Prime ministers (complete list) –

- Ho Chi Minh, Prime minister (1945–1955)
- Phạm Văn Đồng, Prime minister (1955–1976)

- State of Vietnam (South Vietnam) (1949–1955)

- Presidents (complete list) –

- Bảo Đại, President (1949–1955)
- Ngo Dinh Diem, Acting President (1955)

- Prime ministers (complete list) –

- Trần Văn Hữu, Prime minister (1950–1952)
- Nguyễn Văn Tâm, Prime minister (1952–1953)
- Bửu Lộc, Prime minister (1954)
- Phan Huy Quát, Prime minister (1954)
- Ngo Dinh Diem, Prime minister (1954–1955)

- Republic of Vietnam (South Vietnam) (1955–1975)

- Presidents (complete list) –

- Ngo Dinh Diem, President (1955–1963)
- Dương Văn Minh, President (1963–1964)
- Nguyễn Khánh, President (1964)
- Dương Văn Minh, President (1964)
- Nguyễn Khánh, President (1964)
- Dương Văn Minh, President (1964)
- Phan Khắc Sửu, President (1964–1965)
- Nguyễn Văn Thiệu, President (1965–1975)
- Trần Văn Hương, Acting President (1975)
- Dương Văn Minh, Acting President (1975)

- Prime ministers (complete list) –

- Nguyễn Ngọc Thơ, Prime minister (1963–1964)
- Nguyễn Khánh, Prime minister (1964)
- Nguyễn Xuân Oánh, Acting Prime minister (1964)
- Nguyễn Khánh, Prime minister (1964)
- Trần Văn Hương, Prime minister (1964–1965)
- Nguyễn Xuân Oánh, Acting Prime minister (1965)
- Phan Huy Quát, Prime minister (1965)
- Nguyễn Cao Kỳ, Prime minister (1965–1967)
- Nguyễn Văn Lộc, Prime minister (1967–1968)
- Trần Văn Hương, Prime minister (1968–1969)
- Trần Thiện Khiêm, Prime minister (1969–1975)
- Nguyễn Bá Cẩn, Prime minister (1975)
- Vũ Văn Mẫu, Prime minister (1975)

- Republic of South Vietnam (1975–1976)

- Heads of state (complete list) –

- Nguyễn Hữu Thọ, Chairman of the Consultative Council (1969–1976)

- Heads of government (complete list) –

- Huỳnh Tấn Phát, Prime minister (1975–1976)

- Socialist Republic of Vietnam (1976–present)

- General Secretaries of the Communist Party (complete list) –

- Lê Duẩn, General Secretary (1960–1986)
- Trường Chinh, General Secretary (1986)
- Nguyễn Văn Linh, General Secretary (1986–1991)
- Đỗ Mười, General Secretary (1991–1997)
- Lê Khả Phiêu, General Secretary (1997–2001)

- Heads of state (complete list) –

- Tôn Đức Thắng, President (1976–1980)
- Nguyễn Hữu Thọ, Acting President (1980–1981)
- Trường Chinh, Chairmen of the Council of State (1981–1987)
- Võ Chí Công, Chairmen of the Council of State (1987–1992)
- Lê Đức Anh, President (1992–1997)
- Trần Đức Lương, President (1997–2006)

- Heads of government (complete list) –

- Phạm Văn Đồng, Prime minister (1976–1981), Chairmen of the Council of ministers (1981–1987)
- Phạm Hùng, Chairmen of the Council of ministers (1987–1988)
- Võ Văn Kiệt, Acting Chairmen of the Council of ministers (1988)
- Đỗ Mười, Chairmen of the Council of ministers (1988–1991)
- Võ Văn Kiệt, Chairmen of the Council of ministers (1991–1992), Prime minister (1992–1997)
- Phan Văn Khải, Prime minister (1997–2006)

=== Asia: South ===
Afghanistan

- Kingdom of Afghanistan

- Kings (complete list) –

- Mohammad Zahir Shah, King (1933–1973)

- Prime ministers (complete list) –

- Shah Mahmud Khan, Prime minister (1946–1953)
- Mohammed Daoud Khan, Prime minister (1953–1963)
- Mohammad Yusuf, Prime minister (1963–1965)
- Mohammad Hashim Maiwandwal, Prime minister (1965–1967)
- Abdullah Yaqta, Prime minister (1967)
- Mohammad Nur Ahmad Etemadi, Prime minister (1967–1971)
- Sharifi Abdul Zahir, Prime minister (1971–1972)
- Mohammad Musa Shafiq, Prime minister (1972–1973)

- Republic of Afghanistan (complete list) –

- Mohammad Daoud Khan, President (1973–1978)

- Democratic Republic of Afghanistan

- General Secretary of the Central Committee (complete list) –

- Nur Muhammad Taraki, General Secretary (1965–1979)
- Hafizullah Amin, General Secretary (1979)
- Babrak Karmal, General Secretary (1979–1986)
- Mohammad Najibullah, General Secretary (1986–1992)

- Heads of state (complete list) –

- Nur Muhammad Taraki, Chairman (1978–1979)
- Hafizullah Amin, Chairman (1979)
- Babrak Karmal, Chairman (1979–1986)
- Haji Mohammad Chamkani, Acting Chairman (1986–1987)
- Mohammad Najibullah, Chairman (1987), President (1987–1992)
- Abdul Rahim Hatif, Acting President (1992)

- Heads of government (complete list) –

- Nur Muhammad Taraki, Chairman of the Council of Ministers (1978–1979)
- Hafizullah Amin, Prime minister (1979)
- Babrak Karmal, Prime minister (1979–1981)
- Sultan Ali Keshtmand, Prime minister (1981–1988)
- Mohammad Hasan Sharq, Prime minister (1988–1989)
- Sultan Ali Keshtmand, Prime minister (1989–1990)
- Fazal Haq Khaliqyar, Prime minister (1990–1992)

- Islamic State of Afghanistan

- Presidents (complete list) –

- Sibghatullah Mojaddedi, Acting President (1992)
- Burhanuddin Rabbani, President (1992–1996)

- Prime ministers (complete list) –

- Abdul Sabur Farid Kohistani, Prime minister (1992)
- Gulbuddin Hekmatyar, Prime minister (1993–1994)
- Arsala Rahmani Daulat, Prime minister (1994–1995)
- Ahmad Shah Ahmadzai, Prime minister (1995–1996)
- Gulbuddin Hekmatyar, Prime minister (1996)

- Northern Alliance of Afghanistan (complete list) –

- Burhanuddin Rabbani, President (1996–2001)

- Islamic Emirate of Afghanistan

- Supreme leaders (complete list) –

- Mullah Omar (1996–2001)

- Prime ministers –

- Mohammad Rabbani (1996–2001)

Bangladesh

- Bangladesh

- Presidents (complete list) –

- Sheikh Mujibur Rahman, President (1971–1972)
- Syed Nazrul Islam, Acting President (1971–1972)
- Abu Sayeed Chowdhury, President (1972–1973)
- Mohammad Mohammadullah, Acting President (1973–1974), President (1974–1975)
- Sheikh Mujibur Rahman, President (1975)
- Khondaker Mostaq Ahmad, President (1975)
- Abu Sadat Mohammad Sayem, President (1975–1977)
- Ziaur Rahman, President (1977–1981)
- Abdus Sattar, President (1981–1982)
- Hussain Muhammad Ershad, President (1982)
- A. F. M. Ahsanuddin Chowdhury, President (1982–1983)
- Hussain Muhammad Ershad, President (1983–1990)
- Shahabuddin Ahmed, Interim President (1990–1991)
- Abdur Rahman Biswas, President (1991–1996)
- Shahabuddin Ahmed, President (1996–2001)

- Prime ministers (complete list) –

- Tajuddin Ahmad, Prime minister (1971–1972)
- Sheikh Mujibur Rahman, Prime minister (1972–1975)
- Muhammad Mansur Ali, Prime minister (1975)
- Mashiur Rahman, Prime minister (1978–1979)
- Shah Azizur Rahman, Prime minister (1979–1982)
- Ataur Rahman Khan, Prime minister (1984–1986)
- Mizanur Rahman Chowdhury, Prime minister (1986–1988)
- Moudud Ahmed, Prime minister (1988–1989)
- Kazi Zafar Ahmed, Prime minister (1989–1990)
- Khaleda Zia, Prime minister (1991–1996)
- Muhammad Habibur Rahman, Prime minister (1996)
- Sheikh Hasina, Prime minister (1996–2001)

Bhutan

- Bhutan

- Monarchs (complete list) –

- Jigme Wangchuck, Druk Gyalpo (1926–1952)
- Jigme Dorji Wangchuck, Druk Gyalpo (1952–1972)
- Jigme Singye Wangchuck, Druk Gyalpo (1972–2006)

- Prime ministers (complete list) –

- Sonam Topgay Dorji, Chief minister (1917–1952)
- Jigme Palden Dorji, Prime minister (1952–1964)
- Jigme Thinley, Prime minister (1998–1999)
- Sangay Ngedup, Prime minister (1999–2000)
- Yeshey Zimba, Prime minister (2000–2001)

India

- Republic of India

- Presidents (complete list) –

- Rajendra Prasad, President (1950–1962)
- Sarvepalli Radhakrishnan, President (1962–1967)
- Zakir Husain, President (1967–1969)
- V. V. Giri, Acting President (1969)
- Mohammad Hidayatullah, Acting President (1969)
- V. V. Giri, President (1969–1974)
- Fakhruddin Ali Ahmed, President (1974–1977)
- B. D. Jatti, Acting President (1977)
- Neelam Sanjiva Reddy, President (1977–1982)
- Zail Singh, President (1982–1987)
- R. Venkataraman, President (1987–1992)
- Shankar Dayal Sharma, President (1992–1997)
- K. R. Narayanan, President (1997–2002)

- Prime ministers (complete list) –

- Jawaharlal Nehru, Prime minister (1947–1964)
- Gulzarilal Nanda, Acting Prime minister (1964)
- Lal Bahadur Shastri, Prime minister (1964–1966)
- Gulzarilal Nanda, Acting Prime minister (1966)
- Indira Gandhi, Prime minister (1966–1977)
- Morarji Desai, Prime minister (1977–1979)
- Charan Singh, Prime minister (1979–1980)
- Indira Gandhi, Prime minister (1980–1984)
- Rajiv Gandhi, Prime minister (1984–1989)
- V. P. Singh, Prime minister (1989–1990)
- Chandra Shekhar, Prime minister (1990–1991)
- P. V. Narasimha Rao, Prime minister (1991–1996)
- Atal Bihari Vajpayee, Prime minister (1996)
- H. D. Deve Gowda, Prime minister (1996–1997)
- I. K. Gujral, Prime minister (1997–1998)
- Atal Bihari Vajpayee, Prime minister (1998–2004)

Maldives

- First Republic of Maldives (complete list) –

- Mohamed Amin Didi, President (1952–1953)
- Ibrahim Muhammad Didi, Acting President (1953–1954)

- Sultanate of the Maldive Islands: Huraa Dynasty (complete list) –

- Interregnum (1944–1952)
- Muhammad Fareed Didi, Sultan (1954–1965), King (1965–1968)

- United Suvadive Republic

- Abdullah Afeef, President (1959–1963)

- Second Republic of Maldives (complete list) –

- Ibrahim Nasir, President (1968–1978)
- Maumoon Abdul Gayoom, President (1978–2008)

Nepal

- Kingdom of Nepal

- Kings (complete list) –

- Gyanendra, King (1950–1951, 2001–2008)
- Tribhuvan, King (1951–1955)
- Mahendra, King (1955–1972)
- Birendra, King (1972–2001)

- Prime ministers (complete list) –

- Mohan Shumsher Jang Bahadur Rana, Prime minister (1948–1951)
- Matrika Prasad Koirala, Prime minister (1951–1952)
- Matrika Prasad Koirala, Prime minister (1953–1955)
- Tanka Prasad Acharya, Prime minister (1956–1957)
- Kunwar Inderjit Singh, Prime minister (1957–1958)
- Subarna Shamsher Rana, Prime minister (1958–1959)
- Bishweshwar Prasad Koirala, Prime minister (1959–1960)
- Tulsi Giri, Prime minister (1960–1963)
- Surya Bahadur Thapa, Prime minister (1963–1964)
- Tulsi Giri, Prime minister (1964–1965)
- Surya Bahadur Thapa, Prime minister (1965–1969)
- Kirti Nidhi Bista, Prime minister (1969–1970)
- Gehendra Bahadur Rajbhandari, Acting Prime minister (1970–1971)
- Kirti Nidhi Bista, Prime minister (1971–1973)
- Nagendra Prasad Rijal, Prime minister (1973–1975)
- Tulsi Giri, Prime minister (1975–1977)
- Kirti Nidhi Bista, Prime minister (1977–1979)
- Surya Bahadur Thapa, Prime minister (1979–1983)
- Lokendra Bahadur Chand, Prime minister (1983–1986)
- Nagendra Prasad Rijal, Prime minister (1986)
- Marich Man Singh Shrestha, Prime minister (1986–1990)
- Lokendra Bahadur Chand, Prime minister (1990)
- Krishna Prasad Bhattarai, Prime minister (1990–1991)
- Girija Prasad Koirala, Prime minister (1991–1994)
- Man Mohan Adhikari, Prime minister (1994–1995)
- Sher Bahadur Deuba, Prime minister (1995–1997)
- Lokendra Bahadur Chand, Prime minister (1997)
- Surya Bahadur Thapa, Prime minister (1997–1998)
- Girija Prasad Koirala, Prime minister (1998–1999)
- Krishna Prasad Bhattarai, Prime minister (1999–2000)
- Girija Prasad Koirala, Prime minister (2000–2001)

Pakistan

- Dominion of Pakistan

- Monarchs –

- George VI, King (1947–1952)
- Elizabeth II, Queen (1952–1956)

- Prime ministers (complete list) –

- Liaquat Ali Khan, Prime minister (1947–1951)
- Khawaja Nazimuddin, Prime minister (1951–1953)
- Muhammad Ali Bogra, Prime minister (1953–1955)
- Chaudhry Muhammad Ali, Prime minister (1955–1956)

- Islamic Republic of Pakistan

- Presidents (complete list) –

- Iskander Mirza, President (1956–1958)
- Ayub Khan, President (1958–1969)
- Yahya Khan, President (1969–1971)
- Zulfikar Ali Bhutto, President (1971–1973)
- Fazal Ilahi Chaudhry, President (1973–1978)
- Muhammad Zia-ul-Haq, President (1978–1988)
- Ghulam Ishaq Khan, President (1988–1993)
- Wasim Sajjad, Acting President (1993)
- Farooq Leghari, President (1993–1997)
- Wasim Sajjad, Acting President (1997)
- Muhammad Rafiq Tarar, President (1997–2001)

- Prime ministers (complete list) –

- Huseyn Shaheed Suhrawardy, Prime minister (1956–1957)
- Ibrahim Ismail Chundrigar, Prime minister (1957)
- Feroz Khan Noon, Prime minister (1957–1958)
- Nurul Amin, Prime minister (1971)
- Zulfikar Ali Bhutto, Prime minister (1973–1977)
- Muhammad Khan Junejo, Prime minister (1985–1988)
- Benazir Bhutto, Prime minister (1988–1990)
- Ghulam Mustafa Jatoi, Acting Prime minister (1990)
- Nawaz Sharif, Prime minister (1990–1993)
- Balakh Sher Mazari, Acting Prime minister (1993)
- Nawaz Sharif, Prime minister (1993)
- Moeenuddin Ahmad Qureshi, Acting Prime minister (1993)
- Benazir Bhutto, Prime minister (1993–1996)
- Malik Meraj Khalid, Acting Prime minister (1996–1997)
- Nawaz Sharif, Prime minister (1997–1999)

Sri Lanka

- Dominion of Ceylon

- Monarchs –

- George VI, King (1948–1952)
- Elizabeth II, Queen (1952–1972)

- Prime ministers (complete list) –

- Don Stephen Senanayake, Prime minister (1947–1952)
- Dudley Senanayake, Prime minister (1952–1953)
- John Kotelawala, Prime minister (1953–1956)
- S. W. R. D. Bandaranaike, Prime minister (1956–1959)
- Wijeyananda Dahanayake, Prime minister (1959–1960)
- Dudley Senanayake, Prime minister (1960)
- Sirimavo Bandaranaike, Prime minister (1960–1965)
- Dudley Senanayake, Prime minister (1965–1970)
- Sirimavo Bandaranaike, Prime minister (1970–1972)

- Democratic Socialist Republic of Sri Lanka

- Presidents (complete list) –

- William Gopallawa, President (1972–1978)
- Junius Richard Jayewardene, President (1978–1989)
- Ranasinghe Premadasa, President (1989–1993)
- Dingiri Banda Wijetunga, President (1993–1994)
- Chandrika Kumaratunga, President (1994–2005)

- Prime ministers (complete list) –

- Sirimavo Bandaranaike, Prime minister (1972–1977)
- Junius Richard Jayewardene, Prime minister (1977–1978)
- Ranasinghe Premadasa, Prime minister (1978–1989)
- Dingiri Banda Wijetunga, Prime minister (1989–1993)
- Ranil Wickremesinghe, Prime minister (1993–1994)
- Chandrika Kumaratunga, Prime minister (1994)
- Sirimavo Bandaranaike, Prime minister (1994–2000)
- Ratnasiri Wickremanayake, Prime minister (2000–2001)

=== Asia: West ===
Bahrain

- Hakims of Bahrain/ State of Bahrain (complete list) –

Protectorate of the United Kingdom, 1861–1971
- Monarchs (complete list) –

- Salman ibn Hamad Al Khalifa, Hakim (1942–1961)
- Isa bin Salman Al Khalifa, Hakim (1961–1971), Emir (1971–1999)
- Hamad bin Isa Al Khalifa, Emir (1999–2002), King (2002–present)

- Prime ministers (complete list) –

- Khalifa bin Salman Al Khalifa, Prime minister (1971–2020)

Cyprus

- British Cyprus (complete list) –

Colony, 1878–1960
For details see the United Kingdom under British Isles, Europe

- Republic of Cyprus (complete list) –

- Makarios III, President (1960–1974)
- Nikos Sampson, de facto President (1974)
- Glafcos Clerides, Acting President (1974)
- Makarios III, President (1974–1977)
- Spyros Kyprianou, President (1977–1988)
- George Vasiliou, President (1988–1993)
- Glafcos Clerides, President (1993–2003)

- Turkish Federated State of Cyprus (complete list) –

- Nejat Konuk, Prime minister (1976–1978, 1983–1985)
- Osman Örek, Prime minister (1978)
- Mustafa Çağatay, Prime minister (1978–1983)

- Turkish Republic of Northern Cyprus

- Presidents (complete list) –

- Rauf Denktaş, President (1983–2005)

- Prime ministers (complete list) –

- Mustafa Çağatay, Prime minister (1978–1983)
- Nejat Konuk, Prime minister (1976–1978, 1983–1985)
- Derviş Eroğlu, Prime minister (1985–1994, 1996–2004, 2009–2010)
- Hakkı Atun, Prime minister (1994–1996)

Iran

- Imperial State of Iran

- Shahs (complete list) –

- Mohammad Reza Pahlavi, Shah (1941–1979)

- Islamic Republic of Iran

- Supreme Leaders (complete list) –

- Ruhollah Khomeini, Supreme Leader (1979–1989)
- Ali Khamenei, Supreme Leader (1989–2026)

- Presidents (complete list) –

- Abolhassan Banisadr, President (1980–1981)
- Mohammad-Ali Rajai, President (1981)
- Ali Khamenei, President (1981–1989)
- Akbar Hashemi Rafsanjani, President (1989–1997)
- Mohammad Khatami, President (1997–2005)

- Prime ministers (complete list) –

- Mehdi Bazargan, Prime minister (1979)
- Mohammad-Ali Rajai, Prime minister (1980–1981)
- Mohammad-Javad Bahonar, Prime minister (1981)
- Mohammad-Reza Mahdavi Kani, Acting Prime minister (1981)
- Mir-Hossein Mousavi, Prime minister (1981–1989)

Iraq

- Kingdom of Iraq

- Kings (complete list) –

- 'Abd al-Ilah, Regent (1939–1953)
- Faisal II, King (1939–1958)

- Prime ministers (complete list) –

- Nuri al-Said, Prime minister (1930–1932, 1938–1940, 1941–1944, 1946–1947, 1949, 1950–1952, 1954–1957, 1958)
- Mustafa Mahmud al-Umari, Prime minister (1952–1953)
- Nureddin Mahmud, Prime minister (1952–1953)
- Jameel Al-Madfaai, Prime minister (1933–1934, 1935, 1937–1938, 1941, 1953)
- Muhammad Fadhel al-Jamali, Prime minister (1953–1954)
- Arshad al-Umari, Prime minister (1946, 1954)
- Ali Jawdat Al-Ayyubi, Prime minister (1934–1935, 1949–1950, 1957)
- Abdul-Wahab Mirjan, Prime minister (1957–1958)
- Ahmad Mukhtar Baban, Prime minister (1958)

- Iraqi Republic (1958–1968)

- Presidents (complete list) –

- Muhammad Najib ar-Ruba'i, President (1958–1963)
- Abdul Salam Arif, President (1963–1966)
- Abd al-Rahman al-Bazzaz, Interim President (1966)
- Abdul Rahman Arif, President (1966–1968)

- Prime ministers (complete list) –

- Abd al-Karim Qasim, Prime minister (1958–1963)
- Ahmed Hassan al-Bakr, Prime minister (1963)
- Tahir Yahya, Prime minister (1963–1965)
- Arif Abd ar-Razzaq, Prime minister (1965)
- Abd ar-Rahman al-Bazzaz, Prime minister (1965–1966)
- Naji Talib, Prime minister (1966–1967)
- Abdul Rahman Arif, Prime minister (1967)
- Tahir Yahya, Prime minister (1967–1968)

- Ba'athist Iraq

- Presidents (complete list) –

- Ahmed Hassan al-Bakr, President (1968–1979)
- Saddam Hussein, President (1979–2003)

- Prime ministers (complete list) –

- Abd ar-Razzaq an-Naif, Prime minister (1968)
- Ahmed Hassan al-Bakr, Prime minister (1968–1979)
- Saddam Hussein, Prime minister (1979–1991)
- Sa'dun Hammadi, Prime minister (1991)
- Mohammad Hamza al-Zubaidi, Prime minister (1991–1993)
- Ahmad Husayn Khudayir as-Samarrai, Prime minister (1993–1994)
- Saddam Hussein, Prime minister (1994–2003)

Israel

- Israel

- Heads of state (complete list) –

- Chaim Weizmann, Chairman (1948–1949), President (1949–1952)
- Yitzhak Ben-Zvi, President (1952–1963)
- Zalman Shazar, President (1963–1973)
- Ephraim Katzir, President (1973–1978)
- Yitzhak Navon, President (1978–1983)
- Chaim Herzog, President (1983–1993)
- Ezer Weizman, President (1993–2000)
- Moshe Katsav, President (2000–2007)

- Prime ministers (complete list) –

- David Ben-Gurion, Prime minister (1948–1953)
- Moshe Sharett, Prime minister (1953–1955)
- David Ben-Gurion, Prime minister (1955–1963)
- Levi Eshkol, Prime minister (1963–1969)
- Yigal Allon, Acting Prime minister (1969)
- Golda Meir, Prime minister (1969–1974)
- Yitzhak Rabin, Prime minister (1974–1977)
- Menachem Begin, Prime minister (1977–1983)
- Yitzhak Shamir, Prime minister (1983–1984)
- Shimon Peres, Prime minister (1984–1986)
- Yitzhak Shamir, Prime minister (1986–1992)
- Yitzhak Rabin, Prime minister (1992–1995)
- Shimon Peres, Prime minister (1995–1996)
- Benjamin Netanyahu, Prime minister (1996–1999)
- Ehud Barak, Prime minister (1999–2001)

Jordan

- Kingdom of Jordan

- Monarchs (complete list) –

- Abdullah I, Emir (1921–1946), King (1946–1951)
- Talal, King (1951–1952)
- Hussein, King (1952–1999)
- Abdullah II, King (1999–present)

- Prime ministers (complete list) –

- Samir al-Rifai, Prime minister (1950–1951)
- Tawfik Abu al-Huda, Prime minister (1951–1953)
- Fawzi al-Mulki, Prime minister (1953–1954)
- Tawfik Abu al-Huda, Prime minister (1954–1955)
- Sa`id al-Mufti, Prime minister (1955)
- Hazza' al-Majali, Prime minister (1955)
- Ibrahim Hashem, Acting Prime minister (1955–1956)
- Samir al-Rifai, Prime minister (1956)
- Sa`id al-Mufti, Prime minister (1956)
- Ibrahim Hashem, Prime minister (1956)
- Sulayman al-Nabulsi, Prime minister (1956–1957)
- Husayin al-Khalidi, Prime minister (1957)
- Ibrahim Hashem, Prime minister (1957–1958)
- Samir al-Rifai, Prime minister (1958–1959)
- Hazza' al-Majali, Prime minister (1959–1960)
- Bahjat Talhouni, Prime minister (1960–1962)
- Wasfi al-Tal, Prime minister (1962–1963)
- Samir al-Rifai, Prime minister (1963)
- Hussein ibn Nasser, Prime minister (1963–1964)
- Bahjat Talhouni, Prime minister (1964–1965)
- Wasfi al-Tal, Prime minister (1965–1967)
- Hussein ibn Nasser, Prime minister (1967)
- Saad Jumaa, Prime minister (1967)
- Bahjat Talhouni, Prime minister (1967–1969)
- Abdelmunim al-Rifai, Prime minister (1969)
- Bahjat Talhouni, Prime minister (1969–1970)
- Abdelmunim al-Rifai, Prime minister (1970)
- Mohammad Daoud Al-Abbasi, Prime minister (1970)
- Ahmad Toukan, Prime minister (1970)
- Wasfi al-Tal, Prime minister (1970–1971)
- Ahmad Lozi, Prime minister (1971–1973)
- Zaid al-Rifai, Prime minister (1973–1976)
- Mudar Badran, Prime minister (1976–1979)
- Abdelhamid Sharaf, Prime minister (1979–1980)
- Kassim al-Rimawi, Prime minister (1980)
- Mudar Badran, Prime minister (1980–1984)
- Ahmad Obeidat, Prime minister (1984–1985)
- Zaid al-Rifai, Prime minister (1985–1989)
- Zaid ibn Shaker, Prime minister (1989)
- Mudar Badran, Prime minister (1989–1991)
- Taher al-Masri, Prime minister (1991)
- Zaid ibn Shaker, Prime minister (1991–1993)
- Abdelsalam al-Majali, Prime minister (1993–1995)
- Zaid ibn Shaker, Prime minister (1995–1996)
- Abdul Karim al-Kabariti, Prime minister (1996–1997)
- Abdelsalam al-Majali, Prime minister (1997–1998)
- Fayez al-Tarawneh, Prime minister (1998–1999)
- Abdelraouf al-Rawabdeh, Prime minister (1999–2000)
- Ali Abu al-Ragheb, Prime minister (2000–2003)

Kuwait

- Sheikhdom of Kuwait (complete list) –

- Abdullah III, Sheikh (1950–1961), Emir (1961–1965)

- State of Kuwait

- Monarchs (complete list) –

- Abdullah III, Sheikh (1950–1961), Emir (1961–1965)
- Sabah III, Emir (1965–1977)
- Jaber III, Emir (1977–2006)

- Prime ministers (complete list) –

- Abdullah Al-Salim, Prime minister (1962–1963)
- Sabah Al-Salim, Prime minister (1963–1965)
- Jaber Al-Ahmad, Prime minister (1965–1978)
- Saad Al-Abdullah, Prime minister (1978–2003)

Lebanon

- Lebanon

- Presidents (complete list) –

- Bechara El Khoury, President (1943–1952)
- Fuad Chehab, Acting President (1952)
- Camille Chamoun, President (1952–1958)
- Fuad Chehab, President (1958–1964)
- Charles Helou, President (1964–1970)
- Suleiman Frangieh, President (1970–1976)
- Elias Sarkis, President (1976–1982)
- Amine Gemayel, President (1982–1988)
- Selim Hoss, Acting President, Disputed (1988–1989)
- Michel Aoun, Acting President, Disputed (1988–1990)
- René Moawad, President, Disputed (1989)
- Selim Hoss, Acting President (1989)
- Elias Hrawi, President (1989–1998)
- Émile Lahoud, President (1998–2007)

- Prime ministers (complete list) –

- Riad Al Solh, Prime minister (1946–1951)
- Hussein Al Oweini, Prime minister (1951)
- Abdallah El-Yafi, Prime minister (1951–1952)
- Sami as-Solh, Prime minister (1952)
- Nazem Akkari, Prime minister (1952)
- Saeb Salam, Prime minister (1952)
- Abdallah El-Yafi, Prime minister (1952)
- Khaled Chehab, Prime minister (1952–1953)
- Saeb Salam, Prime minister (1953)
- Abdallah El-Yafi, Prime minister (1953–1954)
- Sami as-Solh, Prime minister (1954–1955)
- Rashid Karami, Prime minister (1955–1956)
- Abdallah El-Yafi, Prime minister (1956)
- Sami as-Solh, Prime minister (1956–1958)
- Khalil al-Hibri, Prime minister (1958)
- Rashid Karami, Prime minister (1958–1960)
- Ahmad Daouk, Prime minister (1960)
- Saeb Salam, Prime minister (1960–1961)
- Rashid Karami, Prime minister (1961–1964)
- Hussein Al Oweini, Prime minister (1964–1965)
- Rashid Karami, Prime minister (1965–1966)
- Abdallah El-Yafi, Prime minister (1966)
- Rashid Karami, Prime minister (1966–1968)
- Abdallah El-Yafi, Prime minister (1968–1969)
- Rashid Karami, Prime minister (1969–1970)
- Saeb Salam, Prime minister (1970–1973)
- Amin al-Hafez, Prime minister (1973)
- Takieddin el-Solh, Prime minister (1973–1974)
- Rachid Solh, Prime minister (1974–1975)
- Nureddine Rifai, Prime minister (1975)
- Rashid Karami, Prime minister (1975–1976)
- Selim Hoss, Prime minister (1976–1980)
- Takieddin el-Solh, Prime minister (1980)
- Shafik Wazzan, Prime minister (1980–1984)
- Rashid Karami, Prime minister (1984–1987)
- Selim Hoss, Prime minister (1987–1990)
- Michel Aoun, Disputed Prime minister (1988–1990)
- Omar Karami, Prime minister (1990–1992)
- Rachid Solh, Prime minister (1992)
- Rafic Hariri, Prime minister (1992–1998)
- Selim Hoss, Prime minister (1998–2000)
- Rafic Hariri, Prime minister (2000–2004)

Oman

- Sultanate of Muscat and Oman (complete list) –

- Said III, Sultan (1932–1970)

- Sultanate of Oman: Al Busaidi dynasty (complete list) –

- Qaboos bin Said, Sultan (1970–2020)

Palestine

- State of Palestine (complete list) –

- Yasser Arafat, President (1994–2004)

Qatar

- Qatar

- Emirs (complete list) –

- Ali bin Abdullah Al Thani, Emir (1949–1960)
- Ahmad bin Ali Al Thani, Emir (1960–1972)
- Khalifa bin Hamad Al Thani, Emir (1972–1995)
- Hamad bin Khalifa Al Thani, Emir (1995–2013)

- Prime ministers (complete list) –

- Khalifa bin Hamad, Prime minister (1970–1995)
- Hamad bin Khalifa, Prime minister (1995–1996)
- Abdullah bin Khalifa, Prime minister (1996–2007)

Saudi Arabia

- Kingdom of Saudi Arabia (complete list) –

- Ibn Saud, Emir (1902–1921), Sultan (1921–1932), King (1932–1953)
- Saud, King (1953–1964)
- Faisal, King (1964–1975)
- Khalid, King (1975–1982)
- Fahd, King (1982–2005)

Syria

- Second Syrian Republic

- Presidents (complete list) –

- Hashim al-Atassi, President (1949–1951)
- Adib Shishakli, Acting President (1951)
- Fawzi Selu, President (1951–1953)
- Adib Shishakli, President (1953–1954)
- Maamun al-Kuzbari, Acting President (1954)
- Hashim al-Atassi, President (1954–1955)
- Shukri al-Quwatli, President (1955–1958)

- Prime ministers (complete list) –

- Nazim al-Kudsi, Prime minister (1950–1951)
- Khalid al-Azm, Prime minister (1951)
- Hassan al-Hakim, Prime minister (1951)
- Zaki al-Khatib, Prime minister (1951)
- Maarouf al-Dawalibi, Prime minister (1951)
- Fawzi Selu, Prime minister (1951–1953)
- Adib Shishakli, Prime minister (1953–1954)
- Sabri al-Asali, Prime minister (1954)
- Said al-Ghazzi, Prime minister (1954)
- Fares al-Khoury, Prime minister (1954–1955)
- Sabri al-Asali, Prime minister (1955)
- Said al-Ghazzi, Prime minister (1955–1956)
- Sabri al-Asali, Prime minister (1956–1958)

- United Arab Republic (1958–1961)

- Presidents (complete list) –

- Gamal Abdel Nasser, President (1958–1961)

- Prime ministers (complete list) –

- Nur al-Din Kahala, Prime minister (1958–1960)
- Abdel Hamid al-Sarraj, Prime minister (1960–1961)

- Syrian Arab Republic

- Presidents (complete list) –

- Maamun al-Kuzbari, Acting President (1961)
- Izzat al-Nuss, Acting President (1961)
- Nazim al-Kudsi, President (1961–1963)
- Lu'ay al-Atassi, President (1963)
- Amin al-Hafiz, President (1963–1966)
- Nureddin al-Atassi, President (1966–1970)
- Ahmad al-Khatib, Acting President (1970–1971)
- Hafez al-Assad, President (1971–2000)
- Abdul Halim Khaddam, Acting President (2000)
- Bashar al-Assad, President (2000–present)

- Prime ministers (complete list) –

- Maamun al-Kuzbari, Prime minister (1961)
- Izzat al-Nuss, Prime minister (1961)
- Maarouf al-Dawalibi, Prime minister (1961–1962)
- Bashir al-Azma, Prime minister (1962)
- Khalid al-Azm, Prime minister (1962–1963)
- Salah al-Din al-Bitar, Prime minister (1963)
- Amin al-Hafiz, Prime minister (1963–1964)
- Salah al-Din al-Bitar, Prime minister (1964)
- Amin al-Hafiz, Prime minister (1964–1965)
- Yusuf Zuayyin, Prime minister (1965)
- Salah al-Din al-Bitar, Prime minister (1966)
- Yusuf Zuaiyin, Prime minister (1966–1968)
- Nureddin al-Atassi, Prime minister (1968–1970)
- Hafez al-Assad, Prime minister (1970–1971)
- Abdul Rahman Khleifawi, Prime minister (1971–1972)
- Mahmoud al-Ayyubi, Prime minister (1972–1976)
- Abdul Rahman Khleifawi, Prime minister (1976–1978)
- Muhammad Ali al-Halabi, Prime minister (1978–1980)
- Abdul Rauf al-Kasm, Prime minister (1980–1987)
- Mahmoud Zuabi, Prime minister (1987–2000)
- Muhammad Mustafa Mero, Prime minister (2000–2003)

Turkey

- Republic of Turkey

- Presidents (complete list) –

- Celâl Bayar, President (1950–1960)
- Cemal Gürsel, Chairman (1960–1961), President (1961–1966)
- Cevdet Sunay, President (1966–1973)
- Fahri Korutürk, President (1973–1980)
- Kenan Evren, Chairman (1980–1982), President (1982–1989)
- Turgut Özal, President (1989–1993)
- Süleyman Demirel, President (1993–2000)
- Ahmet Necdet Sezer, President (2000–2007)

- Prime ministers (complete list) –

- Adnan Menderes, Prime minister (1950–1960)
- Cemal Gürsel, Prime minister (1960–1961)
- Fahri Özdilek, Acting Prime minister (1961)
- İsmet İnönü, Prime minister (1961–1965)
- Suat Hayri Ürgüplü, Prime minister (1965)
- Süleyman Demirel, Prime minister (1965–1971)
- Nihat Erim, Prime minister (1971–1972)
- Ferit Melen, Prime minister (1972–1973)
- Naim Talu, Prime minister (1973–1974)
- Bülent Ecevit, Prime minister (1974)
- Sadi Irmak, Prime minister (1974–1975)
- Süleyman Demirel, Prime minister (1975–1977)
- Bülent Ecevit, Prime minister (1977)
- Süleyman Demirel, Prime minister (1977–1978)
- Bülent Ecevit, Prime minister (1978–1979)
- Süleyman Demirel, Prime minister (1979–1980)
- Bülent Ulusu, Prime minister (1980–1983)
- Turgut Özal, Prime minister (1983–1989)
- Ali Bozer, Acting Prime minister (1989)
- Yıldırım Akbulut, Prime minister (1989–1991)
- Mesut Yılmaz, Prime minister (1991)
- Süleyman Demirel, Prime minister (1991–1993)
- Erdal İnönü, Acting Prime minister (1993)
- Tansu Çiller, Prime minister (1993–1996)
- Mesut Yılmaz, Prime minister (1996)
- Necmettin Erbakan, Prime minister (1996–1997)
- Mesut Yılmaz, Prime minister (1997–1999)
- Bülent Ecevit, Prime minister (1999–2002)

United Arab Emirates

- Emirate of Abu Dhabi –

- Shakhbut bin Sultan Al Nahyan, ruler (1928–1966)
- Zayed bin Sultan Al Nahyan, ruler (1966–2004)

- Emirate of Dubai –

- Saeed bin Maktoum bin Hasher Al Maktoum, ruler (1912–1958)
- Rashid bin Saeed Al Maktoum, ruler (1958–1990)

- Emirate of Sharjah –

- Sultan bin Saqr Al Qasimi II, ruler (1924–1951)
- Saqr bin Sultan Al Qasimi, ruler (1951–1965)
- Khalid bin Mohammed Al Qasimi, ruler (1965–1972)

- Emirate of Ajman –

- Rashid bin Humaid Al Nuaimi III, ruler (1928–1981)

- Umm Al Quwain –

- Ahmad bin Rashid Al Mualla, ruler (1929–1981)

- Emirate of Fujairah –

- Mohammed bin Hamad Al Sharqi, ruler (1938–1975)

- Emirate of Ras Al Khaimah –

- Saqr bin Mohammed Al Qasimi, ruler (1948–2010)

- United Arab Emirates

- Presidents (complete list) –

- Zayed bin Sultan Al Nahyan, President (1971–2004)

- Prime ministers (complete list) –

- Maktoum bin Rashid Al Maktoum, Prime minister (1971–1979)
- Rashid bin Saeed Al Maktoum, Prime minister (1979–1990)
- Maktoum bin Rashid Al Maktoum, Prime minister (1990–2006)

Yemen: North

- North Yemen: Mutawakkilite Kingdom of Yemen

- Kings (complete list) –

- Ahmad bin Yahya, King (1948–1962)
- Muhammad al-Badr, King (1962)

- Prime ministers (complete list) –

- Hassan ibn Yahya, Prime minister (1948–1955)

- North Yemen: Yemen Arab Republic

- Heads of State (complete list) –

- Abdullah al-Sallal, President (1962–1967)
- Abdul Rahman al-Eryani, Chairman (1967–1974)
- Ibrahim al-Hamdi, President (1974–1977)
- Ahmad al-Ghashmi, President (1977–1978)
- Abdul Karim Abdullah al-Arashi, Chairman (1978)
- Ali Abdullah Saleh, President (1978–1990)

- Prime ministers (complete list) –

- Abdullah al-Sallal, Prime minister (1962–1963)
- Abdul Latif Dayfallah, Prime minister (1963)
- Abdul Rahman al-Iryani, Prime minister (1963–1964)
- Hassan al-Amri, Prime minister (1964)
- Hamoud al-Gayifi, Prime minister (1964–1965)
- Hassan al-Amri, Prime minister (1965)
- Ahmad Muhammad Numan, Prime minister (1965)
- Abdullah al-Sallal, Prime minister (1965)
- Hassan al-Amri, Prime minister (1965–1966)
- Abdullah al-Sallal, Prime minister (1966–1967)
- Mohsin Ahmad al-Aini, Prime minister (1967)
- Hassan al-Amri, Prime minister (1967–1969)
- Abdul Salam Sabrah, Acting Prime minister (1969)
- Mohsin Ahmad al-Aini, Prime minister (1969)
- Abdullah Kurshumi, Prime minister (1969–1970)
- Mohsin Ahmad al-Aini, Prime minister (1970–1971)
- Abdul Salam Sabrah, Acting Prime minister (1971)
- Ahmad Muhammad Numan, Prime minister (1971)
- Hassan al-Amri, Prime minister (1971)
- Abdul Salam Sabrah, Acting Prime minister (1971)
- Mohsin Ahmad al-Aini, Prime minister (1971–1972)
- Kadhi Abdullah al-Hagri, Prime minister (1972–1974)
- Hassan Muhammad Makki, Prime minister (1974)
- Mohsin Ahmad al-Aini, Prime minister (1974–1975)
- Abdul Latif Dayfallah, Acting Prime minister (1975)
- Abdul Aziz Abdul Ghani, Prime minister (1975–1980)
- Abd Al-Karim Al-Iryani, Prime minister (1980–1983)
- Abdul Aziz Abdul Ghani, Prime minister (1983–1990)

Yemen: South

- Upper Aulaqi Sheikhdom (complete list) –

- Muhsin ibn Farid al-Yaslami al-'Awlaqi, Amir (1902–1959)
- 'Abd Allah ibn Muhsin al-Yaslami al-'Awlaqi, Amir (1959–1967)

- Upper Aulaqi Sultanate (complete list) –
- Wahidi Balhaf of Ba´l Haf and 'Azzan (complete list) –

- Nasir ibn 'Abd Allah al-Wahidi, Sultan (1948–1967)
- 'Ali ibn Muhammad ibn Sa`id al-Wahidi, Regent (1967)
- 'Awad ibn Salih al-'Awlaqi, Sultan (1935–1967)

- Emirate of Dhala (complete list) –

- 'Ali ibn 'Ali al-'Amiri, Emir (1947–1954)
- Shafa`ul ibn 'Ali al-'Amiri, Emir (1954–1967)

- Wahidi Haban (complete list) –

- al-Husayn ibn 'Abd Allah al-Wahidi, Sultan (1962), Subordinate ruler (1962–1967)

- Kathiri State of Seiyun –

- al-Husain ibn 'Ali al-Kathir, Sultan (1949–1967)

- Lower Yafa –

- Aydarus ibn Muhsin al-Afifi, ruler (1925–1958)
- Mahmud ibn Aydarus al-Afifi, ruler (1958–1967)

- Upper Yafa –

- Muhammad ibn Salih ibn 'Umar Al Harhara, Sultan (1948–1967)

- Sultanate of Lahej –

- al-Fadl V ibn 'Abd al-Karim al-'Abdali, Sultan (1947–1952)
- 'Ali III ibn 'Abd al-Karim al-'Abdali, Sultan (1952–1958)
- al-Fadl VI ibn 'Ali al-'Abdali, Sultan (1958–1967)

- Mahra Sultanate –

- Ahmad ibn 'Abd Allah Afrar al-Mahri, Sultan (mid-20th century–1952)
- 'Isa ibn 'Ali ibn Salim Afrar al-Mahri, Sultan (1952–1967)

- Aden Colony (complete list) –

British Colony, 1937–1963
For details see the United Kingdom under British Isles, Europe

- South Yemen: People's Democratic Republic of Yemen

- General Secretary (complete list) –

- Abdul Fattah Ismail, President (1978–1980)
- Ali Nasir Muhammad, President (1980–1986)
- Ali Salem al-Beidh, President (1986–1990)

- Heads of state (complete list) –

- Qahtan Muhammad al-Shaabi, President (1967–1969)
- Salim Rubai Ali, Chairmen (1969–1978)
- Ali Nasir Muhammad, Chairmen (1978)
- Abdul Fattah Ismail, Chairmen (1978–1980)
- Ali Nasir Muhammad, Chairmen (1980–1986)
- Haidar Abu Bakr al-Attas, Chairmen (1986–1990)

- Prime ministers (complete list) –

- Faysal al-Shaabi, Prime minister (1969)
- Muhammad Ali Haitham, Prime minister (1969–1971)
- Ali Nasir Muhammad, Prime minister (1971–1985)
- Haidar Abu Bakr al-Attas, Prime minister (1985–1986)
- Yasin Said Numan, Prime minister (1986–1990)

Yemen: United

- Republic of Yemen

- Presidents (complete list) –

- Ali Abdullah Saleh, Chairman of the Presidential Council (1990–1994), president (1994–2012)

- Prime ministers (complete list) –

- Haidar Abu Bakr al-Attas, Prime minister (1990–1994)
- Muhammad Said al-Attar, Acting Prime minister (1994)
- Abdul Aziz Abdul Ghani, Prime minister (1994–1997)
- Faraj Said Bin Ghanem, Prime minister (1997–1998)
- Abd Al-Karim Al-Iryani, Prime minister (1998–2001)

== Europe ==
=== Europe: Balkans ===
Albania

- People's Socialist Republic of Albania

- First Secretaries (complete list) –

- Enver Hoxha, First Secretary (1941–1985): Democratic Government of Albania (1944–1946)
- Ramiz Alia, First Secretary (1985–1991)

- Chairman (complete list) –

- Omer Nishani, Chairman (1944–1953): Democratic Government of Albania (1944–1946)
- Haxhi Lleshi, Chairman (1953–1982)
- Ramiz Alia, Chairman (1982–1991)

- Prime ministers (complete list) –

- Enver Hoxha, Prime minister (1944–1954): Democratic Government of Albania (1944–1946)
- Mehmet Shehu, Prime minister (1954–1981)
- Adil Çarçani, Prime minister (1981–1991)

- Republic of Albania

- President (complete list) –

- Ramiz Alia, President (1991–1992)
- Kastriot Islami, Acting President (1992)
- Arbnori, Acting President (1992)
- Berisha, President (1992–1997)
- Gjinushi, Acting President (1997)
- Rexhep Meidani, President (1997–2002)

- Prime ministers (complete list) –

- Fatos Nano, Prime minister (1991)
- Ylli Bufi, Prime minister (1991)
- Vilson Ahmeti, Prime minister (1991–1992)
- Aleksandër Meksi, Prime minister (1992–1997)
- Bashkim Fino, Prime minister (1997)
- Fatos Nano, Prime minister (1997–1998)
- Pandeli Majko, Prime minister (1998–1999)
- Ilir Meta, Prime minister (1999–2002)

Bulgaria

- People's Republic of Bulgaria

- General Secretary (complete list) –

- Valko Chervenkov, General Secretary (1949–1954)
- Todor Zhivkov, General Secretary (1954–1989)
- Petar Mladenov, General Secretary (1989–1990)

- Presidents (complete list) –

- Georgi Damyanov, Chairman of the Presidium of the National Assembly (1950–1958)
- Dimitar Ganev, Chairman of the Presidium of the National Assembly (1958–1964)
- Georgi Traykov, Chairman of the Presidium of the National Assembly (1964–1971)
- Todor Zhivkov, Chairman of the State Council (1971–1990), president (1990)
- Petar Mladenov, President (1990)

- Prime ministers (complete list) –

- Vulko Chervenkov, Prime minister (1950–1956)
- Anton Yugov, Prime minister (1956–1962)
- Todor Zhivkov, Prime minister (1962–1971)
- Stanko Todorov, Prime minister (1971–1981)
- Grisha Filipov, Prime minister (1981–1986)
- Georgi Atanasov, Prime minister (1986–1990)
- Andrey Lukanov, Prime minister (1990)

- Republic of Bulgaria

- Presidents (complete list) –

- Zhelyu Zhelev, Chairman (1990–1992), President (1992–1997)
- Petar Stoyanov, President (1997–2002)

- Prime ministers (complete list) –

- Andrey Lukanov, Prime minister (1990)
- Dimitar Iliev Popov, Prime minister (1990)
- Philip Dimitrov, Prime minister (1990–1992)
- Lyuben Berov, Prime minister (1992–1994)
- Reneta Indzhova, Interim Prime minister (1994–1995)
- Zhan Videnov, Prime minister (1995–1997)
- Stefan Sofiyanski, Interim Prime minister (1997)
- Ivan Yordanov Kostov, Prime minister (1997–2001)

Greece

- Kingdom of Greece: 4th of August Regime

- Monarchy (complete list) –

- Paul, King (1947–1964)
- Constantine II, King (1964–1973)

- Prime ministers (complete list) –

- Sofoklis Venizelos, Prime minister (1950–1951)
- Nikolaos Plastiras, Prime minister (1951–1952)
- Dimitrios Kiousopoulos, caretaker Prime minister (1952)
- Alexander Papagos, Prime minister (1952–1955)
- Konstantinos Karamanlis, Prime minister (1955–1958)
- Konstantinos Georgakopoulos, caretaker Prime minister (1958)
- Konstantinos Karamanlis, Prime minister (1958–1961)
- Konstantinos Dovas, Prime minister (1961)
- Konstantinos Karamanlis, Prime minister (1961–1963)
- Panagiotis Pipinelis, Prime minister (1963)
- Stylianos Mavromichalis, caretaker Prime minister (1963)
- Georgios Papandreou, prime minister (1963)
- Ioannis Paraskevopoulos, caretaker Prime minister (1963–1964)
- Georgios Papandreou, Prime minister (1964–1965)
- Georgios Athanasiadis-Novas, Prime minister (1965)
- Ilias Tsirimokos, Prime minister (1965)
- Stefanos Stefanopoulos, Prime minister (1965–1966)
- Ioannis Paraskevopoulos, Interim Prime minister (1966–1967)
- Panagiotis Kanellopoulos, caretaker Prime minister (1967)

- Military junta of Greece (1967–1974)

- Heads of state (complete list) –

- Georgios Zoitakis, Regent (1967–1972)
- Georgios Papadopoulos, Regent (1972–1973), President (1973)
- Phaedon Gizikis, President (1973–1974)

- Heads of government (complete list) –

- Konstantinos Kollias, Prime minister (1967)
- Georgios Papadopoulos, Prime minister (1967–1973)
- Spyros Markezinis, Prime minister (1973)
- Adamantios Androutsopoulos, Prime minister (1973–1974)

- Greece: Third Republic

- Presidents (complete list) –

- Michail Stasinopoulos, President (1974–1975)
- Konstantinos Tsatsos, President (1975–1980)
- Konstantinos Karamanlis, President (1980–1985)
- Ioannis Alevras, Acting President (1985)
- Christos Sartzetakis, President (1985–1990)
- Konstantinos Karamanlis, President (1990–1995)
- Konstantinos Stephanopoulos, President (1995–2005)

- Prime ministers (complete list) –

- Konstantinos Karamanlis, Prime minister (1974–1980)
- Georgios Rallis, Prime minister (1980–1981)
- Andreas Papandreou, Prime minister (1981–1989)
- Tzannis Tzannetakis, Prime minister (1989)
- Ioannis Grivas, caretaker Prime minister (1989)
- Xenophon Zolotas, caretaker Prime minister (1989–1990)
- Konstantinos Mitsotakis, Prime minister (1990–1993)
- Andreas Papandreou, Prime minister (1993–1996)
- Costas Simitis, Prime minister (1996–2004)

Kosovo

- Republic of Kosova

- Presidents (complete list) –

- Ibrahim Rugova, President (1992–1999)

- Prime ministers (complete list) –

- Jusuf Zejnullahu, Prime minister (1990–1991)
- Bujar Bukoshi, Prime minister (1991–2000)
- Hashim Thaçi, Interim Prime minister (1999–2000)

Yugoslavia: Serbia & Yugoslavia

- Yugoslavia: Socialist Federal Republic of Yugoslavia

- General Secretary (complete list) –

- Josip Broz Tito, General Secretary (1945–1964), President of the Presidium (1964–1980)
- Stevan Doronjski, President of the Presidium (1980)
- Lazar Mojsov, President of the Presidium (1980–1981)
- Dušan Dragosavac, President of the Presidium (1981–1982)
- Mitja Ribičić, President of the Presidium (1982–1983)
- Dragoslav Marković, President of the Presidium (1983–1984)
- Ali Shukrija, President of the Presidium (1984–1985)
- Vidoje Žarković, President of the Presidium (1985–1986)
- Milanko Renovica, President of the Presidium (1986–1987)
- Boško Krunić, President of the Presidium (1987–1988)
- Stipe Šuvar, President of the Presidium (1988–1989)
- Milan Pančevski, President of the Presidium (1989–1990)

- Presidents (complete list) –

- Ivan Ribar, President of the Presidency (1945–1953)
- Josip Broz Tito, President (1953–1980)
- Lazar Koliševski, President of the Presidency (1980)
- Cvijetin Mijatović, President of the Presidency (1980–1981)
- Sergej Kraigher, President of the Presidency (1981–1982)
- Petar Stambolić, President of the Presidency (1982–1983)
- Mika Špiljak, President of the Presidency (1983–1984)
- Veselin Đuranović, President of the Presidency (1984–1985)
- Radovan Vlajković, President of the Presidency (1985–1986)
- Sinan Hasani, President of the Presidency (1986–1987)
- Lazar Mojsov, President of the Presidency (1987–1988)
- Raif Dizdarević, President of the Presidency (1988–1989)
- Janez Drnovšek, President of the Presidency (1989–1990)
- Borisav Jović, President of the Presidency (1990–1991)
- Sejdo Bajramović, Acting President of the Presidency (1991)
- Stjepan Mesić, President of the Presidency (1991)
- Branko Kostić, Acting President of the Presidency (1991–1992)

- Prime ministers (complete list) –

- Josip Broz Tito, Prime minister (1941–1963)
- Petar Stambolić, Prime minister (1963–1967)
- Mika Špiljak, Prime minister (1967–1969)
- Mitja Ribičič, Prime minister (1969–1971)
- Džemal Bijedić, Prime minister (1971–1977)
- Veselin Đuranović, Prime minister (1977–1982)
- Milka Planinc, Prime minister (1982–1986)
- Branko Mikulić, Prime minister (1986–1989)
- Ante Marković, Prime minister (1989–1991)
- Aleksandar Mitrović, Acting Prime minister (1991–1992)

- Yugoslavia: Federal Republic of Yugoslavia/ Serbia and Montenegro

- Presidents (complete list) –

- Dobrica Ćosić, President (1992–1993)
- Miloš Radulović, Acting President (1993)
- Zoran Lilić, President (1993–1997)
- Srđa Božović, Acting President (1997)
- Slobodan Milošević, President (1997–2000)
- Vojislav Koštunica, President (2000–2003)

- Prime ministers (complete list) –

- Milan Panić, Prime minister (1992–1993)
- Radoje Kontić, Prime minister (1993–1998)
- Momir Bulatović, Prime minister (1998–2000)
- Zoran Žižić, Prime minister (2000–2001)

Yugoslavia: Bosnia and Herzegovina

- Republic of Bosnia and Herzegovina

- President (complete list) –

- Alija Izetbegović, President (1992–1997)

- Prime ministers (complete list) –

- Jure Pelivan, Prime minister (1992)
- Mile Akmadžić, Prime minister (1992–1993)
- Haris Silajdžić, Prime minister (1993–1996)
- Hasan Muratović, Prime minister (1996–1997)

- Bosnia and Herzegovina

- High Representatives (complete list) –

- Carl Bildt, High Representative (1995–1997)
- Carlos Westendorp, High Representative (1997–1999)
- Wolfgang Petritsch, High Representative (1999–2002)

- Presidency (complete list) –

- Chairmen of the Presidency (complete list) –

- Alija Izetbegović, Chairmen (1996–1998)
- Živko Radišić, Chairmen (1998–1999)
- Ante Jelavić, Chairmen (1999–2000)
- Alija Izetbegović, Chairmen (2000)
- Živko Radišić, Chairmen (2000–2001)

- Bosniak members of the Presidency (complete list) –

- Alija Izetbegović, Member (1996–2000)
- Halid Genjac, Member (2000–2001)

- Croat members of the Presidency (complete list) –

- Krešimir Zubak, Member (1996–1998)
- Ante Jelavić, Member (1998–2001)

- Serb members of the Presidency (complete list) –

- Momčilo Krajišnik, Member (1996–1998)
- Živko Radišić, Member (1998–2002)

- Chairmen of the Council of Ministers (complete list) –

- Haris Silajdžić, Boro Bosić, Co-Chairmen (1997–1999)
- Haris Silajdžić, Svetozar Mihajlović, Co-Chairmen (1999–2000)
- Spasoje Tuševljak, Chairman (2000)
- Martin Raguž, Chairman (2000–2001)

- Autonomous Province of Western Bosnia –

- Fikret Abdić, Governor (1993–1995)

Yugoslavia: Croatia

- Republic of Croatia

- Presidents (complete list) –

- Franjo Tuđman, President (1990–1999)
- Vlatko Pavletić, Acting President (1999–2000)
- Zlatko Tomčić, Acting President (2000)
- Stjepan Mesić, President (2000–2010)

- Prime ministers (complete list) –

- Stjepan Mesić, Prime minister (1990)
- Josip Manolić, Prime minister (1990–1991)
- Franjo Gregurić, Prime minister (1991–1992)
- Hrvoje Šarinić, Prime minister (1992–1993)
- Nikica Valentić, Prime minister (1993–1995)
- Zlatko Mateša, Prime minister (1995–2000)
- Ivica Račan, Prime minister (2000–2003)

- Republic of Serbian Krajina

- Presidents (complete list) –

- Milan Babić, President (1991–1992)
- Mile Paspalj, Acting President (1992–1992)
- Goran Hadžić, President (1992–1994)
- Milan Martić, President (1994–1995)

- Prime ministers (complete list) –

- Dušan Vještica, Prime minister (1991–1992)
- Risto Matković, Acting Prime minister (1992–1992)
- Zdravko Zečević, Prime minister (1992–1993)
- Đorđe Bjegović, Prime minister (1993–1994)
- Borislav Mikelić, Prime minister (1994–1995)
- Milan Babić, Prime minister (1995–1995)

- United Nations Transitional Administration for Eastern Slavonia, Baranja and Western Sirmium –

United Nations protectorate, 1996–1998

Yugoslavia: Macedonia

- Republic of Macedonia

- Presidents (complete list) –

- Kiro Gligorov, President (1991–1999)
- Boris Trajkovski, President (1999–2004)

- Prime ministers (complete list) –

- Nikola Kljusev, Prime minister (1991–1992)
- Branko Crvenkovski, Prime minister (1992–1998)
- Ljubčo Georgievski, Prime minister (1998–2002)

Yugoslavia: Slovenia

- Slovenia

- Presidents (complete list) –

- Milan Kučan, President (1991–2002)

- Prime ministers (complete list) –

- Lojze Peterle, Prime minister (1990–1992)
- Janez Drnovšek, Prime minister (1992–2000)
- Andrej Bajuk, Prime minister (2000)
- Janez Drnovšek, Prime minister (2000–2002)

=== Europe: Baltic states ===
Estonia

- Republic of Estonia

- Heads of state (complete list) –

- Lennart Meri, President (1992–2001)

- Prime ministers (complete list) –

- Otto Tief, Prime minister (1945–1963)
- Edgar Savisaar, Acting Prime minister (1991–1992)
- Tiit Vähi, Acting Prime minister (1992)
- Mart Laar, Prime minister (1992–1994)
- Andres Tarand, Prime minister (1994–1995)
- Tiit Vähi, Prime minister (1995–1997)
- Mart Siimann, Prime minister (1997–1999)
- Mart Laar, Prime minister (1999–2002)

Latvia

- Republic of Latvia

- Presidents (complete list) –

- Guntis Ulmanis, President (1993–1999)
- Vaira Vīķe-Freiberga, President (1999–2007)

- Prime ministers (complete list) –

- Ivars Godmanis, Prime minister (1990–1993)
- Valdis Birkavs, Prime minister (1993–1994)
- Māris Gailis, Prime minister (1994–1995)
- Andris Šķēle, Prime minister (1995–1997)
- Guntars Krasts, Prime minister (1997–1998)
- Vilis Krištopans, Prime minister (1998–1999)
- Andris Šķēle, Prime minister (1999–2000)
- Andris Bērziņš, Prime minister (2000–2002)

Lithuania

- Republic of Lithuania

- Presidents (complete list) –

- Vytautas Landsbergis, Chairman of the Supreme Council (1991–1992)
- Algirdas Brazauskas, President (1992–1998)
- Valdas Adamkus, President (1998–2003)

- Prime ministers (complete list) –

- Kazimira Prunskienė, Prime minister (1990–1991)
- Albertas Šimėnas, Prime minister (1991)
- Gediminas Vagnorius, Prime minister (1991–1992)
- Aleksandras Abišala, Prime minister (1992)
- Bronislovas Lubys, Prime minister (1992–1993)
- Adolfas Šleževičius, Prime minister (1993–1996)
- Laurynas Stankevičius, Prime minister (1996)
- Gediminas Vagnorius, Prime minister (1996–1999)
- Irena Degutienė, Acting Prime minister (1999)
- Rolandas Paksas, Prime minister (1999)
- Irena Degutienė, Acting Prime minister (1999)
- Andrius Kubilius, Prime minister (1999–2000)
- Rolandas Paksas, Prime minister (2000–2001)

=== Europe: British Isles ===
Ireland

- Republic of Ireland

- Presidents (complete list) –

- Seán T. O'Kelly, President (1945–1959)
- Éamon de Valera, President (1959–1973)
- Erskine Hamilton Childers, President (1973–1974)
- Cearbhall Ó Dálaigh, President (1974–1976)
- Patrick Hillery, President (1976–1990)
- Mary Robinson, President (1990–1997)
- Mary McAleese, President (1997–2011)

- Taoiseachs (complete list) –

- John A. Costello, Taoiseach (1948–1951)
- Éamon de Valera, Taoiseach (1951–1954)
- John A. Costello, Taoiseach (1954–1957)
- Éamon de Valera, Taoiseach (1957–1959)
- Seán Lemass, Taoiseach (1959–1966)
- Jack Lynch, Taoiseach (1966–1973)
- Liam Cosgrave, Taoiseach (1973–1977)
- Jack Lynch, Taoiseach (1977–1979)
- Charles Haughey, Taoiseach (1979–1981)
- Garret FitzGerald, Taoiseach (1981–1982)
- Charles Haughey, Taoiseach (1982)
- Garret FitzGerald, Taoiseach (1981–1987)
- Charles Haughey, Taoiseach (1987–1992)
- Albert Reynolds, Taoiseach (1992–1994)
- John Bruton, Taoiseach (1994–1997)
- Bertie Ahern, Taoiseach (1997–2008)

United Kingdom

- United Kingdom of Great Britain and Northern Ireland

- Monarchs (complete list) –

- George VI, King (1936–1952)
- Elizabeth II, Queen (1952–2022)

- Prime ministers (complete list) –

- Clement Attlee, Prime minister (1945–1951)
- Winston Churchill, Prime minister (1951–1955)
- Anthony Eden, Prime minister (1955–1957)
- Harold Macmillan, Prime minister (1957–1963)
- Alec Douglas-Home, Prime minister (1963–1964)
- Harold Wilson, Prime minister (1964–1970)
- Edward Heath, Prime minister (1970–1974)
- Harold Wilson, Prime minister (1974–1976)
- James Callaghan, Prime minister (1976–1979)
- Margaret Thatcher, Prime minister (1979–1990)
- John Major, Prime minister (1990–1997)
- Tony Blair, Prime minister (1997–2007)

=== Europe: Central ===
Austria

- Austria

- Federal Presidents (complete list) –

- Theodor Körner, President (1951–1957)
- Adolf Schärf, President (1957–1965)
- Franz Jonas, President (1965–1974)
- Rudolf Kirchschläger, President (1974–1986)
- Kurt Waldheim, President (1986–1992)
- Thomas Klestil, President (1992–2004)

- Chancellors (complete list) –

- Leopold Figl, Chancellor (1945–1953)
- Julius Raab, Chancellor (1953–1961)
- Alfons Gorbach, Chancellor (1961–1964)
- Josef Klaus, Chancellor (1964–1970)
- Bruno Kreisky, Chancellor (1970–1983)
- Fred Sinowatz, Chancellor (1983–1986)
- Franz Vranitzky, Chancellor (1986–1997)
- Viktor Klima, Chancellor (1997–2000)
- Wolfgang Schüssel, Chancellor (2000–2007)

- Allied-occupied Austria

- American zone High Commissioners (complete list) –

- Walter J. Donnelly, High Commissioner (1950–1952)
- Llewellyn Thompson, High Commissioner (1952–1955)

- British zone High Commissioners (complete list) –

- Harold Caccia, High Commissioner (1950–1954)
- Geoffrey Wallinger, High Commissioner (1954–1955)

- French zone High Commissioners (complete list) –

- Antoine Béthouart, High Commissioner (1945–1955)
- Jean Payart, High Commissioner (1950–1954)
- Jean Chauvel, High Commissioner (1954–1955)
- Roger Lalouette, High Commissioner (1955)
- François Seydoux de Clausonne, High Commissioner (1955)

- Soviet zone Commanders (complete list) –

- Vladimir Petrovich Sviridov, High Commissioner (1949–1953)
- Ivan Ilyichev, High Commissioner (1953–1955)

Czechoslovakia

- Czechoslovak Socialist Republic

- General Secretaries (complete list) –

- Klement Gottwald, General Secretary (1948–1953)
- Antonín Novotný, General Secretary (1953–1968)
- Alexander Dubček, General Secretary (1968–1969)
- Gustáv Husák, General Secretary (1969–1987)
- Miloš Jakeš, General Secretary (1987–1989)
- Karel Urbánek, General Secretary (1989)

- Presidents (complete list) –

- Klement Gottwald, President (1948–1953)
- Antonín Zápotocký, President (1953–1957)
- Antonín Novotný, President (1957–1968)
- Ludvík Svoboda, President (1968–1975)
- Gustáv Husák, President (1976–1989)

- Prime ministers (complete list) –

- Antonín Zápotocký, Prime minister (1948–1953)
- Viliam Široký, Prime minister (1953–1963)
- Jozef Lenárt, Prime minister (1963–1968)
- Oldřich Černík, Prime minister (1968–1970)
- Lubomír Štrougal, Prime minister (1970–1988)
- Ladislav Adamec, Prime minister (1988–1989)

- Czech and Slovak Federative Republic

- Presidents (complete list) –

- Václav Havel, President (1989–1992)

- Prime ministers (complete list) –

- Marián Čalfa, Prime minister (1989–1992)
- Jan Stráský, Prime minister (1992)

- Czech Republic

- Presidents (complete list) –

- Václav Havel, President (1993–2003)

- Prime ministers (complete list) –

- Václav Klaus, Prime minister (1992–1998)
- Josef Tošovský, Prime minister (1998)
- Miloš Zeman, Prime minister (1998–2002)

- Chechen Republic of Ichkeria (complete list) –

- Dzhokhar Dudayev, President (1991–1996)
- Zelimkhan Yandarbiyev, President (1996–1997)
- Aslan Maskhadov, President (1997–2000)

- Slovakia

- Presidents (complete list) –

- Vladimír Mečiar, Acting President (1993)
- Michal Kováč, President (1993–1999)
- Rudolf Schuster, President (1999–2004)

- Prime ministers (complete list) –

- Vladimír Mečiar, Prime minister (1993–1994)
- Jozef Moravčík, Prime minister (1994)
- Vladimír Mečiar, Prime minister (1994–1998)
- Mikuláš Dzurinda, Prime minister (1998–2006)

Germany

- Allied-occupied Germany

- High Commissioners (complete list) –

- John J. McCloy, High Commissioner (1949–1952)
- Walter J. Donnelly, High Commissioner (1952)
- Samuel Reber, High Commissioner (1952–1953)
- James B. Conant, High Commissioner (1953–1955)

- High Commissioners (complete list) –

- Ivone Kirkpatrick, High Commissioner (1950–1953)
- Frederick Millar, High Commissioner (1953–1955)

- High Commissioners (complete list) –

- André François-Poncet, High Commissioner (1949–1955)

- Commanders (complete list) –

- Vasily Chuikov, Chief Administrator (1949), Chairman of Control Commission (1949–1953)
- Vladimir Semyonov, High Commissioner (1953–1954)
- Georgy Pushkin, High Commissioner (1954–1955)

- East Germany

- General Secretaries (complete list) –

- Walter Ulbricht, General Secretary (1950–1953), First Secretary (1953–1971)
- Erich Honecker, First Secretary (1971–1976), General Secretary (1976–1989)
- Egon Krenz, General Secretary (1989)

- Heads of state (complete list) –

- Wilhelm Pieck, President (1949–1960)
- Walter Ulbricht, Chairmen of the State Council (1960–1973)
- Willi Stoph, Chairmen of the State Council (1973–1976)
- Erich Honecker, Chairmen of the State Council (1976–1989)
- Egon Krenz, Chairmen of the State Council (1989)
- Manfred Gerlach, Chairmen of the State Council (1989–1990)
- Sabine Bergmann-Pohl, Presidents of the Volkskammer (1990)

- Chairman of the Council of Ministers (complete list) –

- Otto Grotewohl, Chairman (1949–1964)
- Willi Stoph, Chairman (1964–1973)
- Horst Sindermann, Chairman (1973–1976)
- Willi Stoph, Chairman (1976–1989)
- Hans Modrow, Chairman (1989–1990)
- Lothar de Maizière, Chairman (1990)

- West Germany

- Presidents (complete list) –

- Theodor Heuss, President (1949–1959)
- Heinrich Lübke, President (1959–1969)
- Gustav Heinemann, President (1969–1974)
- Walter Scheel, President (1974–1979)
- Karl Carstens, President (1979–1984)
- Richard von Weizsäcker, President of West Germany (1984–1990), President of reunified Germany (1990–1994)

- Chancellors (complete list) –

- Konrad Adenauer, Chancellor (1945–1963)
- Ludwig Erhard, Chancellor (1963–1966)
- Kurt Georg Kiesinger, Chancellor (1966–1969)
- Willy Brandt, Chancellor (1969–1974)
- Helmut Schmidt, Chancellor (1974–1982)
- Helmut Kohl, Chancellor of West Germany (1982–1990), Chancellor of reunified Germany (1990–1998)

- Federal Republic of Germany

- Presidents (complete list) –

- Richard von Weizsäcker, President of West Germany (1984–1990), President of reunified Germany (1990–1994)
- Roman Herzog, President (1994–1999)
- Johannes Rau, President (1999–2004)

- Chancellors (complete list) –

- Helmut Kohl, Chancellor of West Germany (1982–1990), Chancellor of reunified Germany (1990–1998)
- Gerhard Schröder, Chancellor (1998–2005)

Hungary

- Hungarian People's Republic

- General Secretaries (complete list) –

- Mátyás Rákosi, General Secretary (1948–1956)
- Ernő Gerő, General Secretary (1956)
- János Kádár, General Secretary (1956–1988)
- Károly Grósz, General Secretary (1988–1989)
- Rezső Nyers, Party President (1989)

- Chairmen of the Presidential Council (complete list) –

- Sándor Rónai, Chairman (1950–1952)
- István Dobi, Chairman (1952–1967)
- Pál Losonczi, Chairman (1967–1987)
- Károly Németh, Chairman (1987–1988)
- Brunó Ferenc Straub, Chairman (1988–1989)

- Prime ministers (complete list) –

- István Dobi, Prime minister (1949–1952)
- Mátyás Rákosi, Prime minister (1952–1953)
- Imre Nagy, Prime minister (1953–1955)
- András Hegedüs, Prime minister (1955–1956)
- Imre Nagy, Prime minister (1956)
- János Kádár, Prime minister (1956–1958)
- Ferenc Münnich, Prime minister (1958–1961)
- János Kádár, Prime minister (1961–1965)
- Gyula Kállai, Prime minister (1965–1967)
- Jenő Fock, Prime minister (1967–1975)
- György Lázár, Prime minister (1975–1987)
- Károly Grósz, Prime minister (1987–1988)
- Miklós Németh, Prime minister (1988–1989)

- Hungary: Third Republic

- Presidents (complete list) –

- Mátyás Szűrös, Acting President (1989–1990)
- Árpád Göncz, President (1990–2000)
- Ferenc Mádl, President (2000–2005)

- Prime ministers (complete list) –

- Miklós Németh, Provisional Prime minister (1989–1990)
- József Antall, Prime minister (1990–1993)
- Péter Boross, Prime minister (1993–1994)
- Gyula Horn, Prime minister (1994–1998)
- Viktor Orbán, Prime minister (1998–2002)

Liechtenstein

- Liechtenstein

- Sovereign Princes (complete list) –

- Franz Josef II, Prince (1938–1989)
- Hans-Adam II, Prince (1989–present)

- Heads of government (complete list) –

- Alexander Frick, Prime minister (1945–1962)
- Gerard Batliner, Prime minister (1962–1970)
- Alfred Hilbe, Prime minister (1970–1974)
- Walter Kieber, Prime minister (1974–1978)
- Hans Brunhart, Prime minister (1978–1993)
- Markus Büchel, Prime minister (1993)
- Mario Frick, Prime minister (1993–2001)

Poland

- Polish People's Republic

- Party leaders (complete list) –

- Bolesław Bierut, General Secretary (1948–1956)
- Edward Ochab, First Secretary (1956)
- Władysław Gomułka, First Secretary (1956–1970)
- Edward Gierek, First Secretary (1970–1980)
- Stanisław Kania, First Secretary (1980–1981)
- Wojciech Jaruzelski, First Secretary (1981–1989)
- Mieczysław Rakowski, First Secretary (1989–1990)

- Chairman of the Council of State (complete list) –

- Bolesław Bierut, President (1947–1952)
- Aleksander Zawadzki, Chairman (1952–1964)
- Edward Ochab, Chairman (1964–1968)
- Marian Spychalski, Chairman (1968–1970)
- Józef Cyrankiewicz, Chairman (1970–1972)
- Henryk Jabłoński, Chairman (1972–1985)
- Wojciech Jaruzelski, Chairman (1985–1989), President (1989)

- Prime ministers (complete list) –

- Józef Cyrankiewicz, Prime minister (1947–1952)
- Bolesław Bierut, Prime minister (1952–1954)
- Józef Cyrankiewicz, Prime minister (1954–1970)
- Piotr Jaroszewicz, Prime minister (1970–1980)
- Edward Babiuch, Prime minister (1980)
- Józef Pińkowski, Prime minister (1980–1981)
- Wojciech Jaruzelski, Prime minister (1981–1985)
- Zbigniew Messner, Prime minister (1985–1988)
- Mieczysław Rakowski, Prime minister (1988–1989)
- Czesław Kiszczak, Prime minister (1989)
- Tadeusz Mazowiecki, Prime minister (1989–1991)

- Republic of Poland

- Presidents (complete list) –

- Wojciech Jaruzelski, President (1989–1990)
- Lech Wałęsa, President (1990–1995)
- Aleksander Kwaśniewski, President (1995–2005)

- Prime ministers (complete list) –

- Tadeusz Mazowiecki, Prime minister (1989–1991)
- Jan Krzysztof Bielecki, Prime minister (1991)
- Jan Olszewski, Prime minister (1991–1992)
- Waldemar Pawlak, Prime minister (1992)
- Hanna Suchocka, Prime minister (1992–1993)
- Waldemar Pawlak, Prime minister (1993–1995)
- Józef Oleksy, Prime minister (1995–1996)
- Włodzimierz Cimoszewicz, Prime minister (1996–1997)
- Jerzy Buzek, Prime minister (1997–2001)

Switzerland

- Switzerland (complete list) –

- Eduard von Steiger, President of the Confederation (1951)
- Karl Kobelt, President of the Confederation (1952)
- Philipp Etter, President of the Confederation (1953)
- Rodolphe Rubattel, President of the Confederation (1954)
- Max Petitpierre, President of the Confederation (1955)
- Markus Feldmann, President of the Confederation (1956)
- Hans Streuli, President of the Confederation (1957)
- Thomas Holenstein, President of the Confederation (1958)
- Paul Chaudet, President of the Confederation (1959)
- Max Petitpierre, President of the Confederation (1960)
- Friedrich Traugott Wahlen, President of the Confederation (1961)
- Paul Chaudet, President of the Confederation (1962)
- Willy Spühler, President of the Confederation (1963)
- Ludwig von Moos, President of the Confederation (1964)
- Hans-Peter Tschudi, President of the Confederation (1965)
- Hans Schaffner, President of the Confederation (1966)
- Roger Bonvin, President of the Confederation (1967)
- Willy Spühler, President of the Confederation (1968)
- Ludwig von Moos, President of the Confederation (1969)
- Hans-Peter Tschudi, President of the Confederation (1970)
- Rudolf Gnägi, President of the Confederation (1971)
- Nello Celio, President of the Confederation (1972)
- Roger Bonvin, President of the Confederation (1973)
- Ernst Brugger, President of the Confederation (1974)
- Pierre Graber, President of the Confederation (1975)
- Rudolf Gnägi, President of the Confederation (1976)
- Kurt Furgler, President of the Confederation (1977)
- Willi Ritschard, President of the Confederation (1978)
- Hans Hürlimann, President of the Confederation (1979)
- Georges-André Chevallaz, President of the Confederation (1980)
- Kurt Furgler, President of the Confederation (1981)
- Fritz Honegger, President of the Confederation (1982)
- Pierre Aubert, President of the Confederation (1983)
- Leon Schlumpf, President of the Confederation (1984)
- Kurt Furgler, President of the Confederation (1985)
- Alphons Egli, President of the Confederation (1986)
- Pierre Aubert, President of the Confederation (1987)
- Otto Stich, President of the Confederation (1988)
- Jean-Pascal Delamuraz, President of the Confederation (1989)
- Arnold Koller, President of the Confederation (1990)
- Flavio Cotti, President of the Confederation (1991)
- René Felber, President of the Confederation (1992)
- Adolf Ogi, President of the Confederation (1993)
- Otto Stich, President of the Confederation (1994)
- Kaspar Villiger, President of the Confederation (1995)
- Jean-Pascal Delamuraz, President of the Confederation (1996)
- Arnold Koller, President of the Confederation (1997)
- Flavio Cotti, President of the Confederation (1998)
- Ruth Dreifuss, President of the Confederation (1999)
- Adolf Ogi, President of the Confederation (2000)

=== Europe: East ===
Belarus

- Republic of Belarus

- Heads of state (complete list) –

- Stanislau Shushkevich, Chairman of the Supreme Soviet (1991–1994)
- Vyacheslav Nikolayevich Kuznetsov, Chairman of the Supreme Soviet (1994)
- Myechyslaw Hryb, Acting Chairman of the Supreme Soviet (1994)
- Alexander Lukashenko, President (1994–present)

- Prime ministers (complete list) –

- Vyacheslav Kebich, Prime minister (1991–1994)
- Mikhail Chigir, Prime minister (1994–1996)
- Sergey Ling, Prime minister (1996–2000)
- Vladimir Yermoshin, Prime minister (2000–2001)

Moldova

- Republic of Moldova

- Presidents (complete list) –

- Mircea Snegur, President (1990–1997)
- Petru Lucinschi, President (1997–2001)

- Prime ministers (complete list) –

- Valeriu Muravschi, Prime minister (1991–1992)
- Andrei Sangheli, Prime minister (1992–1997)
- Ion Ciubuc, Prime minister (1997–1999)
- Serafim Urechean, Acting Prime minister (1999)
- Ion Sturza, Prime minister (1999)
- Dumitru Braghiș, Prime minister (1999–2001)

- Transnistria

- Heads of State (complete list) –

- Igor Smirnov, Chairman of the Provisional Supreme Soviet (1990), of the Republic (1990–1991)
- Andrey Manoylov, Acting Chairman of the Republic (1991)
- Igor Smirnov, Chairman of the Republic (1991), President (1991–2011)

- Prime ministers (complete list) –

- Stanislav Moroz, Acting Prime minister (1990)

Romania

- Socialist Republic of Romania

- General Secretaries (complete list) –

- Gheorghe Gheorghiu-Dej, General Secretary (1944–1954)
- Gheorghe Apostol, General Secretary (1954–1955)
- Gheorghe Gheorghiu-Dej, General Secretary (1955–1965)
- Nicolae Ceaușescu, General Secretary (1965–1989)

- Heads of state (complete list) –

- Constantin Ion Parhon, President of the Provisional Presidium (1947–1948), President of the Presidium (1948–1952)
- Nicolae Ceaușescu, President of the State Council (1967–1974), President (1974–1989)

- Presidents of the council of ministers (complete list) –

- Petru Groza, Prime minister (1947–1952)
- Gheorghe Gheorghiu-Dej, Prime minister (1952–1955)
- Chivu Stoica, Prime minister (1955–1961)
- Ion Gheorghe Maurer, Prime minister (1961–1974)
- Manea Mănescu, Prime minister (1974–1979)
- Ilie Verdeț, Prime minister (1979–1982)
- Constantin Dăscălescu, Prime minister (1982–1989)

- Republic of Romania

- Presidents (complete list) –

- Ion Iliescu, President (1989–1996)
- Emil Constantinescu, President (1996–2000)
- Ion Iliescu, President (2000–2004)

- Prime ministers (complete list) –

- Petre Roman, Acting Prime minister (1989–1990), Prime minister (1990–1991)
- Theodor Stolojan, Prime minister (1991–1992)
- Nicolae Văcăroiu, Prime minister (1992–1996)
- Victor Ciorbea, Prime minister (1996–1998)
- Gavril Dejeu, Interim Prime minister (1998–1999)
- Radu Vasile, Prime minister (1999)
- Alexandru Athanasiu, Interim Prime minister (1999)
- Mugur Isărescu, Prime minister (1999–2000)
- Adrian Năstase, Prime minister (2000–2004)

Russia

- Soviet Union

- General Secretary (complete list) –

- Nikita Khrushchev, General Secretary (1953–1964)
- Leonid Brezhnev, First Secretary (1964–1966), General Secretary (1966–1982)
- Yuri Andropov, General Secretary (1982–1984)
- Konstantin Chernenko, General Secretary (1984–1985)
- Mikhail Gorbachev, General Secretary (1985–1991)

- Heads of state (complete list) –

- Nikolay Shvernik, Chairman of the Presidium of the Supreme Soviet (1946–1953)
- Kliment Voroshilov, Chairman of the Presidium of the Supreme Soviet (1953–1960)
- Leonid Brezhnev, Chairman of the Presidium of the Supreme Soviet (1960–1964)
- Anastas Mikoyan, Chairman of the Presidium of the Supreme Soviet (1964–1965)
- Nikolai Podgorny, Chairman of the Presidium of the Supreme Soviet (1965–1977)
- Leonid Brezhnev, Chairman of the Presidium of the Supreme Soviet (1977–1982)
- Yuri Andropov, Chairman of the Presidium of the Supreme Soviet (1983–1984)
- Konstantin Chernenko, Chairman of the Presidium of the Supreme Soviet (1984–1985)
- Andrei Gromyko, Chairman of the Presidium of the Supreme Soviet (1985–1988)
- Mikhail Gorbachev, Chairman of the Supreme Soviet (1988–1990), president (1990–1991)

- Heads of governments (complete list) –

- Joseph Stalin, Chairman of the Council of People's Commissars (1941–1946), Chairman of the Council of Ministers (1946–1953)
- Georgy Malenkov, Chairman of the Council of Ministers (1953–1955)
- Nikolai Bulganin, Chairman of the Council of Ministers (1955–1958)
- Nikita Khrushchev, Chairman of the Council of Ministers (1958–1964)
- Alexei Kosygin, Chairman of the Council of Ministers (1964–1980)
- Nikolai Tikhonov, Chairman of the Council of Ministers (1980–1985)
- Nikolai Ryzhkov, Chairman of the Council of Ministers (1985–1991)
- Valentin Pavlov, Prime minister (1991)
- Ivan Silayev, Chairman of the Interstate Economic Committee (1991)

- Russia

- Presidents (complete list) –

- Boris Yeltsin, President (1991–1999)
- Vladimir Putin, Acting President (1999–2000), President (2000–2008)

- Prime ministers (complete list) –

- Boris Yeltsin, Prime minister (1991–1992)
- Viktor Chernomyrdin, Prime minister (1992–1998)
- Sergey Kiriyenko, Prime minister (1998)
- Yevgeny Primakov, Prime minister (1998–1999)
- Sergei Stepashin, Prime minister (1999)
- Vladimir Putin, Prime minister (1999–2000)
- Mikhail Kasyanov, Prime minister (2000–2004)

Ukraine

- Ukraine

- Presidents (complete list) –

- Leonid Kravchuk, President (1991–1994)
- Leonid Kuchma, President (1994–2005)

- Prime ministers (complete list) –

- Vitold Fokin, Acting Prime minister (1990–1991), Prime minister (1991–1992)
- Valentyn Symonenko, Acting Prime minister (1992)
- Leonid Kuchma, Prime minister (1992–1993)
- Yukhym Zvyahilsky, Acting Prime minister (1993–1994)
- Vitaliy Masol, Prime minister (1994–1995)
- Yevhen Marchuk, Prime minister (1995–1996)
- Pavlo Lazarenko, Prime minister (1996–1997)
- Vasyl Durdynets, Acting Prime minister (1997)
- Valeriy Pustovoitenko, Prime minister (1997–1999)
- Viktor Yushchenko, Prime minister (1999–2001)

=== Europe: Nordic ===
Denmark

- Denmark

- Monarchs (complete list) –

- Frederik IX, King (1947–1972)
- Margrethe II, Queen (1972–2024)

- Prime ministers (complete list) –

- Erik Eriksen, Prime minister (1950–1953)
- Hans Hedtoft, Prime minister (1953–1955)
- H. C. Hansen, Prime minister (1955–1960)
- Viggo Kampmann, Prime minister (1960–1962)
- Jens Otto Krag, Prime minister (1962–1968)
- Hilmar Baunsgaard, Prime minister (1968–1971)
- Jens Otto Krag, Prime minister (1971–1972)
- Anker Jørgensen, Prime minister (1972–1973)
- Poul Hartling, Prime minister (1973–1975)
- Anker Jørgensen, Prime minister (1975–1982)
- Poul Schlüter, Prime minister (1982–1993)
- Poul Nyrup Rasmussen, Prime minister (1993–2001)

Finland

- Finland

- Presidents (complete list) –

- Juho Kusti Paasikivi, President (1946–1956)
- Urho Kekkonen, President (1956–1982)
- Mauno Koivisto, President (1982–1994)
- Martti Ahtisaari, President (1994–2000)
- Tarja Halonen, President (2000–2012)

- Prime ministers (complete list) –

- Urho Kekkonen, Prime minister (1950–1953)
- Sakari Tuomioja, Prime minister (1953–1954)
- Ralf Törngren, Prime minister (1954)
- Urho Kekkonen, Prime minister (1954–1956)
- Karl-August Fagerholm, Prime minister (1956–1957)
- V. J. Sukselainen, Prime minister (1957)
- Rainer von Fieandt, Prime minister (1957)
- Reino Kuuskoski, Prime minister (1957–1958)
- Karl-August Fagerholm, Prime minister (1958–1959)
- V. J. Sukselainen, Prime minister (1959–1961)
- Martti Miettunen, Prime minister (1961–1962)
- Ahti Karjalainen, Prime minister (1962–1963)
- Reino Ragnar Lehto, Prime minister (1963–1964)
- Johannes Virolainen, Prime minister (1964–1966)
- Rafael Paasio, Prime minister (1966–1968)
- Mauno Koivisto, Prime minister (1968–1970)
- Teuvo Aura, Prime minister (1970)
- Ahti Karjalainen, Prime minister (1970–1971)
- Teuvo Aura, Prime minister (1971–1972)
- Rafael Paasio, Prime minister (1972)
- Kalevi Sorsa, Prime minister (1972–1975)
- Keijo Liinamaa, Prime minister (1975)
- Martti Miettunen, Prime minister (1975–1977)
- Kalevi Sorsa, Prime minister (1977–1979)
- Mauno Koivisto, Prime minister (1979–1982)
- Kalevi Sorsa, Prime minister (1982–1987)
- Harri Holkeri, Prime minister (1987–1991)
- Esko Aho, Prime minister (1991–1995)
- Paavo Lipponen, Prime minister (1995–2003)

Iceland

- Iceland

- Presidents (complete list) –

- Sveinn Björnsson, President (1944–1952)
- Ásgeir Ásgeirsson, President (1952–1968)
- Kristján Eldjárn, President (1968–1980)
- Vigdís Finnbogadóttir, President (1980–1996)
- Ólafur Ragnar Grímsson, President (1996–2016)

- Prime ministers (complete list) –

- Steingrímur Steinþórsson, Prime minister (1950–1953)
- Ólafur Thors, Prime minister (1953–1956)
- Hermann Jónasson, Prime minister (1956–1958)
- Emil Jónsson, Prime minister (1958–1959)
- Ólafur Thors, Prime minister (1959–1963)
- Bjarni Benediktsson, Prime minister (1963–1970)
- Jóhann Hafstein, Prime minister (1970–1971)
- Ólafur Jóhannesson, Prime minister (1971–1974)
- Geir Hallgrímsson, Prime minister (1974–1978)
- Ólafur Jóhannesson, Prime minister (1978–1979)
- Benedikt Sigurðsson Gröndal, Prime minister (1979–1980)
- Gunnar Thoroddsen, Prime minister (1980–1983)
- Steingrímur Hermannsson, Prime minister (1983–1987)
- Þorsteinn Pálsson, Prime minister (1987–1988)
- Steingrímur Hermannsson, Prime minister (1988–1991)
- Davíð Oddsson, Prime minister (1991–2004)

Norway

- Norway

- Monarchs (complete list) –

- Haakon VII, King (1905–1957)
- Olav V, King (1957–1991)
- Harald V, King (1991–2026)

- Prime ministers (complete list) –

- Einar Gerhardsen, Prime minister (1945–1951)
- Oscar Torp, Prime minister (1951–1955)
- Einar Gerhardsen, Prime minister (1955–1963)
- John Lyng, Prime minister (1963)
- Einar Gerhardsen, Prime minister (1963–1965)
- Per Borten, Prime minister (1965–1971)
- Trygve Bratteli, Prime minister (1971–1972)
- Lars Korvald, Prime minister (1972–1973)
- Trygve Bratteli, Prime minister (1973–1976)
- Odvar Nordli, Prime minister (1976–1981)
- Gro Harlem Brundtland, Prime minister (1981)
- Kåre Willoch, Prime minister (1981–1986)
- Gro Harlem Brundtland, Prime minister (1986–1989)
- Jan P. Syse, Prime minister (1989–1990)
- Gro Harlem Brundtland, Prime minister (1990–1996)
- Thorbjørn Jagland, Prime minister (1996–1997)
- Kjell Magne Bondevik, Prime minister (1997–2000)
- Jens Stoltenberg, Prime minister (2000–2001)

Sweden

- Sweden

- Monarchs (complete list) –

- Gustaf VI Adolf, King (1950–1973)
- Carl XVI Gustaf, King (1973–present)

- Prime ministers (complete list) –

- Tage Erlander, Prime minister (1946–1969)
- Olof Palme, Prime minister (1969–1976)
- Thorbjörn Fälldin, Prime minister (1976–1978)
- Ola Ullsten, Prime minister (1978–1979)
- Thorbjörn Fälldin, Prime minister (1979–1982)
- Olof Palme, Prime minister (1982–1986)
- Ingvar Carlsson, Prime minister (1986–1991)
- Carl Bildt, Prime minister (1991–1994)
- Ingvar Carlsson, Prime minister (1994–1996)
- Göran Persson, Prime minister (1996–2006)

=== Europe: Southcentral ===
Italy

- Italy

- Presidents (complete list) –

- Luigi Einaudi, President (1948–1955)
- Giovanni Gronchi, President (1955–1962)
- Antonio Segni, President (1962–1964)
- Giuseppe Saragat, President (1964–1971)
- Giovanni Leone, President (1971–1978)
- Sandro Pertini, President (1978–1985)
- Francesco Cossiga, President (1985–1992)
- Oscar Luigi Scalfaro, President (1992–1999)
- Carlo Azeglio Ciampi, President (1999–2006)

- Prime ministers (complete list) –

- Alcide De Gasperi, Prime minister (1946–1953)
- Giuseppe Pella, Prime minister (1953–1954)
- Amintore Fanfani, Prime minister (1954)
- Mario Scelba, Prime minister (1954–1955)
- Antonio Segni, Prime minister (1955–1957)
- Adone Zoli, Prime minister (1957–1958)
- Amintore Fanfani, Prime minister (1958–1959)
- Antonio Segni, Prime minister (1959–1960)
- Fernando Tambroni, Prime minister (1960)
- Amintore Fanfani, Prime minister (1960–1963)
- Giovanni Leone, Prime minister (1963)
- Aldo Moro, Prime minister (1963–1968)
- Giovanni Leone, Prime minister (1968)
- Mariano Rumor, Prime minister (1968–1970)
- Emilio Colombo, Prime minister (1970–1972)
- Giulio Andreotti, Prime minister (1972–1973)
- Mariano Rumor, Prime minister (1973–1974)
- Aldo Moro, Prime minister (1974–1976)
- Giulio Andreotti, Prime minister (1976–1979)
- Francesco Cossiga, Prime minister (1979–1980)
- Arnaldo Forlani, Prime minister (1980–1981)
- Giovanni Spadolini, Prime minister (1981–1982)
- Amintore Fanfani, Prime minister (1982–1983)
- Bettino Craxi, Prime minister (1983–1987)
- Amintore Fanfani, Prime minister (1987)
- Giovanni Goria, Prime minister (1987–1988)
- Ciriaco De Mita, Prime minister (1988–1989)
- Giulio Andreotti, Prime minister (1989–1992)
- Giuliano Amato, Prime minister (1992–1993)
- Carlo Azeglio Ciampi, Prime minister (1993–1994)
- Silvio Berlusconi, Prime minister (1994–1995)
- Lamberto Dini, Prime minister (1995–1996)
- Romano Prodi, Prime minister (1996–1998)
- Massimo D'Alema, Prime minister (1998–2000)
- Giuliano Amato, Prime minister (2000–2001)

Malta

- Crown Colony of Malta (complete list) –

British protectorate, 1800–1813; British crown colony, 1813–1964
For details see the United Kingdom under British Isles, Europe

- State of Malta

- Monarchs (complete list) –

- Elizabeth II, Queen (1964–1974)

- Prime ministers (complete list) –

- Giorgio Borġ Olivier, Prime minister (1962–1971)
- Dom Mintoff, Prime minister (1971–1984)

- Republic of Malta

- Presidents (complete list) –

- Anthony Mamo, President (1974–1976)
- Anton Buttigieg, President (1976–1981)
- Albert Hyzler, Acting President (1981–1982)
- Agatha Barbara, President (1982–1987)
- Paul Xuereb, Acting President (1987–1989)
- Ċensu Tabone, President (1989–1994)
- Ugo Mifsud Bonnici, President (1994–1999)
- Guido de Marco, President (1999–2004)

- Prime ministers (complete list) –

- Dom Mintoff, Prime minister (1971–1984)
- Karmenu Mifsud Bonnici, Prime minister (1984–1987)
- Eddie Fenech Adami, Prime minister (1987–1996)
- Alfred Sant, Prime minister (1996–1998)
- Eddie Fenech Adami, Prime minister (1998–2004)

San Marino

- San Marino

- Captains Regent (1900–present) –

- Marino Della Balda, Luigi Montironi, Captains Regent (1950–1951)
- Alvaro Casali, Romolo Giacomini, Captains Regent (1951)
- Domenico Forcellini, Giovanni Terenzi, Captains Regent (1951–1952)
- Domenico Morganti, Mariano Ceccoli, Captains Regent (1952)
- Arnaldo Para, Eugenio Bernardini, Captains Regent (1952–1953)
- Vincenzo Pedini, Alberto Reffi, Captains Regent (1953)
- Giordano Giacomini, Giuseppe Renzi, Captains Regent (1953–1954)
- Giuseppe Forcellini, Secondo Fiorini, Captains Regent (1954)
- Agostino Giacomini, Luigi Montironi, Captains Regent (1954–1955)
- Domenico Forcellini, Vittorio Meloni, Captains Regent (1955)
- Primo Bugli, Giuseppe Maiani, Captains Regent (1955–1956)
- Mario Nanni, Enrico Andreoli, Captains Regent (1956)
- Mariano Ceccoli, Eugenio Bernardini, Captains Regent (1956–1957)
- Giordano Giacomini, Primo Marani, Captains Regent (1957)
- Federico Bigi, Alvaro Casali, Pietro Giancecchi, Zaccaria Giovanni Savoretti, Provisional Captains Regent (1957)
- Marino Valdes Franciosi, Federico Micheloni, Captains Regent (1957–1958)
- Zaccaria Giovanni Savoretti, Stelio Montironi, Captains Regent (1958)
- Domenico Forcellini, Pietro Reffi, Captains Regent (1958–1959)
- Marino Benedetto Belluzzi, Agostino Biordi, Captains Regent (1959)
- Giuseppe Forcellini, Ferruccio Piva, Captains Regent (1959–1960)
- Alvaro Casali, Gino Vannucci, Captains Regent (1960)
- Eugenio Reffi, Pietro Giancecchi, Captains Regent (1960–1961)
- Federico Micheloni, Giancarlo Ghironzi, Captains Regent (1961)
- Giovanni Vito Marcucci, Pio Galassi, Captains Regent (1961–1962)
- Domenico Forcellini, Francesco Valli, Captains Regent (1962)
- Antonio Maria Morganti, Agostino Biordi, Captains Regent (1962–1963)
- Leonida Suzzi Valli, Stelio Montironi, Captains Regent (1963)
- Giovan Luigi Franciosi, Domenico Bollini, Captains Regent (1963–1964)
- Marino Benedetto Belluzzi, Eusebio Reffi, Captains Regent (1964)
- Giuseppe Micheloni, Pier Marino Mularoni, Captains Regent (1964–1965)
- Ferruccio Piva, Federico Carattoni, Captains Regent (1965)
- Alvaro Casali, Pietro Reffi, Captains Regent (1965–1966)
- Francesco Valli, Emilio Della Balda, Captains Regent (1966)
- Giovanni Vito Marcucci, Francesco Maria Francini, Captains Regent (1966–1967)
- Vittorio Rossini, Alberto Lonfernini, Captains Regent (1967)
- Domenico Forcellini, Romano Michelotti, Captains Regent (1967–1968)
- Marino Benedetto Belluzzi, Dante Rossi, Captains Regent (1968)
- Pietro Giancecchi, Aldo Zavoli, Captains Regent (1968–1969)
- Ferruccio Piva, Stelio Montironi, Captains Regent (1969)
- Alvaro Casali, Giancarlo Ghironzi, Captains Regent (1969–1970)
- Francesco Valli, Eusebio Reffi, Captains Regent (1970)
- Simone Rossini, Giuseppe Lonfernini, Captains Regent (1970–1971)
- Luigi Lonfernini, Attilio Montanari, Captains Regent (1971)
- Federico Carattoni, Marino Vagnetti, Captains Regent (1971–1972)
- Marino Benedetto Belluzzi, Giuseppe Micheloni, Captains Regent (1972)
- Rosolino Martelli, Bruno Casali, Captains Regent (1972–1973)
- Francesco Maria Francini, Primo Bugli, Captains Regent (1973)
- Antonio Lazzaro Volpinari, Giovan Luigi Franciosi, Captains Regent (1973–1974)
- Ferruccio Piva, Giordano Bruno Reffi, Captains Regent (1974)
- Francesco Valli, Enrico Andreoli, Captains Regent (1974–1975)
- Alberto Cecchetti, Michele Righi, Captains Regent (1975)
- Giovanni Vito Marcucci, Giuseppe Della Balda, Captains Regent (1975–1976)
- Clelio Galassi, Marino Venturini, Captains Regent (1976)
- Primo Bugli, Virgilio Cardelli, Captains Regent (1976–1977)
- Alberto Lonfernini, Antonio Lazzaro Volpinari, Captains Regent (1977)
- Giordano Bruno Reffi, Tito Masi, Captains Regent (1977–1978)
- Francesco Valli, Enrico Andreoli, Captains Regent (1978)
- Ermenegildo Gasperoni, Adriano Reffi, Captains Regent (1978–1979)
- Marino Bollini, Lino Celli, Captains Regent (1979)
- Giuseppe Amici, Germano De Biagi, Captains Regent (1979–1980)
- Pietro Chiaruzzi, Primo Marani, Captains Regent (1980)
- Giancarlo Berardi, Rossano Zafferani, Captains Regent (1980–1981)
- Gastone Pasolini, Maria Lea Pedini-Angelini, Captains Regent (1981)
- Mario Rossi, Ubaldo Biordi, Captains Regent (1981–1982)
- Giuseppe Maiani, Marino Venturini, Captains Regent (1982)
- Libero Barulli, Maurizio Gobbi, Captains Regent (1982–1983)
- Adriano Reffi, Massimo Roberto Rossini, Captains Regent (1983)
- Renzo Renzi, Germano De Biagi, Captains Regent (1983–1984)
- Gloriana Ranocchini, Giorgio Crescentini, Captains Regent (1984)
- Marino Bollini, Giuseppe Amici, Captains Regent (1984–1985)
- Enzo Colombini, Severiano Tura, Captains Regent (1985)
- Pier Paolo Gasperoni, Ubaldo Biordi, Captains Regent (1985–1986)
- Marino Venturini, Ariosto Maiani, Captains Regent (1986)
- Giuseppe Arzilli, Maurizio Tomassoni, Captains Regent (1986–1987)
- Renzo Renzi, Carlo Franciosi, Captains Regent (1987)
- Rossano Zafferani, Gianfranco Terenzi, Captains Regent (1987–1988)
- Umberto Barulli, Rosolino Martelli, Captains Regent (1988)
- Luciano Cardelli, Reves Salvatori, Captains Regent (1988–1989)
- Mauro Fiorini, Marino Vagnetti, Captains Regent (1989)
- Gloriana Ranocchini, Leo Achilli, Captains Regent (1989–1990)
- Adalmiro Bartolini, Ottaviano Rossi, Captains Regent (1990)
- Cesare Gasperoni, Roberto Bucci, Captains Regent (1990–1991)
- Domenico Bernardini, Claudio Podeschi, Captains Regent (1991)
- Edda Ceccoli, Marino Riccardi, Captains Regent (1991–1992)
- Germano De Biagi, Ernesto Benedettini, Captains Regent (1992)
- Romeo Morri, Marino Zanotti, Captains Regent (1992–1993)
- Patrizia Busignani, Salvatore Tonelli, Captains Regent (1993)
- Gian Luigi Berti, Paride Andreoli, Captains Regent (1993–1994)
- Alberto Cecchetti, Fausto Mularoni, Captains Regent (1994)
- Renzo Ghiotti, Luciano Ciavatta, Captains Regent (1994–1995)
- Marino Bollini, Settimio Lonfernini, Captains Regent (1995)
- Pier Natalino Mularoni, Marino Venturini, Captains Regent (1995–1996)
- Pier Paolo Gasperoni, Pietro Bugli, Captains Regent (1996)
- Maurizio Rattini, Gian Carlo Venturini, Captains Regent (1996–1997)
- Paride Andreoli, Pier Marino Mularoni, Captains Regent (1997)
- Luigi Mazza, Marino Zanotti, Captains Regent (1997–1998)
- Alberto Cecchetti, Loris Francini, Captains Regent (1998)
- Pietro Berti, Paolo Bollini, Captains Regent (1998–1999)
- Antonello Bacciocchi, Rosa Zafferani, Captains Regent (1999)
- Marino Bollini, Giuseppe Arzilli, Captains Regent (1999–2000)
- Maria Domenica Michelotti, Gian Marco Marcucci, Captains Regent (2000)
- Gianfranco Terenzi, Enzo Colombini, Captains Regent (2000–2001)

Vatican

- Vatican City

- Sovereign (complete list) –

- Pius XII, Sovereign (1939–1958)
- John XXIII, Sovereign (1958–1963)
- Paul VI, Sovereign (1963–1978)
- John Paul I, Sovereign (1978)
- John Paul II, Sovereign (1978–2005)

- President of the Governorate (complete list) –

- Nicola Canali, President of the Governorate (1939–1961)
- Amleto Giovanni Cicognani, President of the Governorate (1961–1969)
- Jean-Marie Villot, President of the Governorate (1969–1979)
- Agostino Casaroli, President of the Governorate (1979–1984)
- Sebastiano Baggio, President of the Governorate (1984–1990)
- Rosalio José Castillo Lara, President of the Governorate (1990–1997)
- Edmund Szoka, President of the Governorate (1997–2006)

=== Europe: Southwest ===
Andorra

- Andorra

- Episcopal Co-Princes (complete list) –

- Ramon Iglesias i Navarri, Episcopal Co-Prince (1943–1969)
- Ramon Malla Call, Interim Episcopal Co-Prince (1969–1971)
- Joan Martí i Alanis, Episcopal Co-Prince (1971–2003)

- French Co-Princes (complete list) –

- Vincent Auriol, French Co-Prince (1947–1954)
- René Coty, French Co-Prince (1954–1959)
- Charles de Gaulle, French Co-Prince (1959–1969)
- Alain Poher, Acting French Co-Prince (1969)
- Georges Pompidou, French Co-Prince (1969–1974)
- Alain Poher, Acting French Co-Prince (1974)
- Valéry Giscard d'Estaing, French Co-Prince (1974–1981)
- François Mitterrand, French Co-Prince (1981–1995)
- Jacques Chirac, French Co-Prince (1995–2007)

- Prime ministers (complete list) –

- Òscar Ribas Reig, Prime minister (1982–1984)
- Josep Pintat-Solans, Prime minister (1984–1990)
- Òscar Ribas Reig, Prime minister (1990–1994)
- Marc Forné Molné, Prime minister (1994–2005)

Portugal

- Second Portuguese Republic

- Presidents (complete list) –

- Óscar Carmona, President (1935–1951)
- António de Oliveira Salazar, Acting President (1951)
- Francisco Craveiro Lopes, President (1951–1958)
- Américo Thomaz, President (1958–1974)

- Presidents of the Council of Ministers (complete list) –

- António de Oliveira Salazar, President of the Council of Ministers (1933–1968)
- Marcello Caetano, President of the Council of Ministers (1968–1974)

- Third Republic of Portugal

- Presidents (complete list) –

- National Salvation Junta: António de Spínola (President), Francisco da Costa Gomes, Jaime Silvério Marques, Diogo Neto, Carlos Galvão de Melo, José Pinheiro de Azevedo, António Rosa Coutinho, Acting Head of state (1974)
- António de Spínola, President (1974)
- Francisco da Costa Gomes, President (1974–1976)
- António Ramalho Eanes, President (1976–1986)
- Mário Soares, President (1986–1996)
- Jorge Sampaio, President (1996–2006)

- Prime ministers (complete list) –

- National Salvation Junta: António de Spínola, Francisco da Costa Gomes, Jaime Silvério Marques, Diogo Neto, Carlos Galvão de Melo, José Pinheiro de Azevedo, António Rosa Coutinho, Acting Head of government (1974)
- Adelino da Palma Carlos, Prime minister (1974)
- Vasco Gonçalves, Prime minister (1974–1975)
- José Pinheiro de Azevedo, Prime minister (1975–1976)
- Vasco de Almeida e Costa, Acting Prime minister (1976)
- Mário Soares, Prime minister (1976–1978)
- Alfredo Nobre da Costa, Prime minister (1978)
- Carlos Alberto da Mota Pinto, Prime minister (1978–1979)
- Maria de Lourdes Pintasilgo, Prime minister (1979–1980)
- Francisco de Sá Carneiro, Prime minister (1980)
- Diogo de Freitas do Amaral, Acting Head of government (1980–1981)
- Francisco Pinto Balsemão, Prime minister (1981–1983)
- Mário Soares, Prime minister (1983–1985)
- Aníbal Cavaco Silva, Prime minister (1985–1995)
- António Guterres, Prime minister (1995–2002)

Spain

- Francoist Spain

- Heads of state (complete list) –

- Francisco Franco, Caudillo (1936–1975)
- Alejandro Rodríguez de Valcárcel, President of the Regency (1975)

- Prime ministers (complete list) –

- Francisco Franco, Prime minister (1936–1973)
- Luis Carrero Blanco, Prime minister (1973)
- Torcuato Fernández-Miranda, Acting Prime minister (1973)
- Carlos Arias Navarro, Prime minister (1973–1975)

- Kingdom of Spain

- Monarchs (complete list) –

- Juan Carlos I, King (1975–2014)

- Prime ministers (complete list) –

- Carlos Arias Navarro, Prime minister (1975–1976)
- Fernando de Santiago y Díaz, Acting Prime minister (1976)
- Adolfo Suárez, Prime minister (1976–1981)
- Leopoldo Calvo-Sotelo, Prime minister (1981–1982)
- Felipe González, Prime minister (1982–1996)
- José María Aznar, Prime minister (1996–2004)

=== Europe: West ===
Belgium

- Belgium

- Monarchs (complete list) –

- Leopold III, King (1934–1951)
- Charles, Prince Regent (1944–1950)
- Baudouin, King (1951–1993)
- Albert II, King (1993–2013)

- Prime ministers (complete list) –

- Joseph Pholien, Prime minister (1950–1952)
- Jean Van Houtte, Prime minister (1952–1954)
- Achille Van Acker, Prime minister (1954–1958)
- Gaston Eyskens, Prime minister (1958–1961)
- Théo Lefèvre, Prime minister (1961–1965)
- Pierre Harmel, Prime minister (1965–1966)
- Paul Vanden Boeynants, Prime minister (1966–1968)
- Gaston Eyskens, Prime minister (1968–1973)
- Edmond Leburton, Prime minister (1973–1974)
- Leo Tindemans, Prime minister (1974–1978)
- Paul Vanden Boeynants, Prime minister (1978–1979)
- Wilfried Martens, Prime minister (1979–1981)
- Mark Eyskens, Prime minister (1981)
- Wilfried Martens, Prime minister (1981–1992)
- Jean-Luc Dehaene, Prime minister (1992–1999)
- Guy Verhofstadt, Prime minister (1999–2008)

France

- French Fourth Republic

- Presidents (complete list) –

- Vincent Auriol, President (1947–1954)
- René Coty, President (1954–1959)

- President of the Council of ministers (complete list) –

- René Pleven, Prime minister (1950–1951)
- Henri Queuille, Prime minister (1951)
- René Pleven, Prime minister (1951–1952)
- Edgar Faure, Prime minister (1952)
- Antoine Pinay, Prime minister (1952–1953)
- René Mayer, Prime minister (1953)
- Joseph Laniel, Prime minister (1953–1954)
- Pierre Mendès France, Prime minister (1954–1955)
- Christian Pineau, Prime minister (1955)
- Edgar Faure, Prime minister (1955–1956)
- Guy Mollet, Prime minister (1956–1957)
- Maurice Bourgès-Maunoury, Prime minister (1957)
- Félix Gaillard, Prime minister (1957–1958)
- Pierre Pflimlin, Prime minister (1958)
- Charles de Gaulle, Prime minister (1958–1959)

- France: Fifth Republic

- Presidents (complete list) –

- Charles de Gaulle, President (1959–1969)
- Alain Poher, Acting President (1969)
- Georges Pompidou, President (1969–1974)
- Alain Poher, Acting President (1974)
- Valéry Giscard d'Estaing, President (1974–1981)
- François Mitterrand, President (1981–1995)
- Jacques Chirac, President (1995–2007)

- Prime ministers (complete list) –

- Michel Debré, Prime minister (1959–1962)
- Georges Pompidou, Prime minister (1962–1968)
- Maurice Couve de Murville, Prime minister (1968–1969)
- Jacques Chaban-Delmas, Prime minister (1969–1972)
- Pierre Messmer, Prime minister (1972–1974)
- Jacques Chirac, Prime minister (1974–1976)
- Raymond Barre, Prime minister (1976–1981)
- Pierre Mauroy, Prime minister (1981–1984)
- Laurent Fabius, Prime minister (1984–1986)
- Jacques Chirac, Prime minister (1986–1988)
- Michel Rocard, Prime minister (1988–1991)
- Édith Cresson, Prime minister (1991–1992)
- Pierre Bérégovoy, Prime minister (1992–1993)
- Édouard Balladur, Prime minister (1993–1995)
- Alain Juppé, Prime minister (1995–1997)
- Lionel Jospin, Prime minister (1997–2002)

Luxembourg

- Luxembourg

- Monarchs (complete list) –

- Charlotte, Grand Duchess (1919–1964)
- Jean, Grand Duke (1964–2000)
- Henri, Grand Duke (2000–2025)

- Prime ministers (complete list) –

- Pierre Dupong, Prime minister (1937–1953)
- Joseph Bech, Prime minister (1953–1958)
- Pierre Frieden, Prime minister (1958–1959)
- Pierre Werner, Prime minister (1959–1974)
- Gaston Thorn, Prime minister (1974–1979)
- Pierre Werner, Prime minister (1979–1984)
- Jacques Santer, Prime minister (1984–1995)
- Jean-Claude Juncker, Prime minister (1995–2013)

Monaco

- Monaco

- Sovereign Prince (complete list) –

- Rainier III, Prince (1949–2005)

- Minister of State (complete list) –

- Pierre Voizard, Minister of state (1950–1953)
- Henry Soum, Minister of state (1953–1959)
- Émile Pelletier, Minister of state (1959–1962)
- Pierre Blanchy, Acting Minister of state (1962–1963)
- Jean Reymond, Minister of state (1963–1966)
- Paul Demange, Minister of state (1966–1969)
- François-Didier Gregh, Minister of state (1969–1972)
- André Saint-Mleux, Minister of state (1972–1981)
- Jean Herly, Minister of state (1981–1985)
- Jean Ausseil, Minister of state (1985–1991)
- Jacques Dupont, Minister of state (1991–1994)
- Paul Dijoud, Minister of state (1994–1997)
- Michel Lévêque, Minister of state (1997–2000)
- Patrick Leclercq, Minister of state (2000–2005)

Netherlands

- Kingdom of the Netherlands

- Monarchs (complete list) –

- Juliana, Queen (1948–1980)
- Beatrix, Queen (1980–2013)

- Prime ministers of the Netherlands; from 1954, Chairman of the Council of Ministers of the Kingdom of the Netherlands (complete list) –

- Willem Drees, Prime minister (1948–1958)
- Louis Beel, Prime minister (1958–1959)
- Jan de Quay, Prime minister (1959–1963)
- Victor Marijnen, Prime minister (1963–1965)
- Jo Cals, Prime minister (1965–1966)
- Jelle Zijlstra, Prime minister (1966–1967)
- Piet de Jong, Prime minister (1967–1971)
- Barend Biesheuvel, Prime minister (1971–1973)
- Joop den Uyl, Prime minister (1973–1977)
- Dries van Agt, Prime minister (1977–1982)
- Ruud Lubbers, Prime minister (1982–1994)
- Wim Kok, Prime minister (1994–2002)

=== Eurasia: Caucasus ===
Armenia

- Armenia

- Presidents (complete list) –

- Levon Ter-Petrosyan, President (1991–1998)
- Robert Kocharyan, President (1998–2008)

- Prime ministers (complete list) –

- Vazgen Manukyan, Prime minister (1990–1991)
- Gagik Harutyunyan, Prime minister (1991–1992)
- Khosrov Harutyunyan, Prime minister (1992–1993)
- Hrant Bagratyan, Prime minister (1993–1996)
- Armen Sargsyan, Prime minister (1996–1997)
- Robert Kocharyan, Prime minister (1997–1998)
- Armen Darbinyan, Prime minister (1998–1999)
- Vazgen Sargsyan, Prime minister (1999)
- Aram Sargsyan, Prime minister (1999–2000)
- Andranik Margaryan, Prime minister (2000–2007)

Azerbaijan

- Azerbaijan

- Presidents (complete list) –

- Ayaz Mutallibov, President (1991–1992)
- Yagub Mammadov, Acting President (1992)
- Ayaz Mutallibov, President (1992)
- Isa Gambar, Acting President (1992)
- Abulfaz Elchibey, President (1992–1993)
- Heydar Aliyev, President (1993–2003)

- Prime ministers (complete list) –

- Hasan Hasanov, Prime minister (1991–1992)
- Firuz Mustafayev, Acting Prime minister (1992)
- Rahim Huseynov, Prime minister (1992–1993)
- Ali Masimov, Acting Prime minister (1993)
- Panah Huseynov, Prime minister (1993)
- Surat Huseynov, Prime minister (1993–1994)
- Fuad Guliyev, Prime minister (1994–1996)
- Artur Rasizade, Prime minister (1996–2003)

- Republic of Artsakh

- Heads of State (complete list) –

- Artur Mkrtchyan, Chairmen of the Supreme Council (1992)
- Georgi Petrosian, Acting Chairmen of the Supreme Council (1992–1993)
- Karen Baburyan, Acting Chairmen of the Supreme Council (1993–1994)
- Robert Kocharyan, President (1994–1997)
- Leonard Petrosyan, President (1997)
- Arkadi Ghukasyan, President (1997–2007)

- Presidents of the National Assembly (complete list) –

- Leonard Petrosyan, President of the National Assembly (1991–1992)
- Artur Mkrtchyan, President of the National Assembly (1992)
- Georgi Petrosian Acting President of the National Assembly (1992–1993)
- Karen Baburyan, President of the National Assembly (1993–1996)
- Arthur Tovmasyan, President of the National Assembly (1996–1997)
- Oleg Yesayan, President of the National Assembly (1997–2005)

Georgia

- Georgia

- Presidents (complete list) –

- Zviad Gamsakhurdia, President (1991–1992)
- Eduard Shevardnadze, President (1992–2003)

- Heads of government (complete list) –

- Murman Omanidze, Acting Prime minister (1991)
- Besarion Gugushvili, Prime minister (1991–1992)
- Tengiz Sigua, Prime minister (1992–1993)
- Eduard Shevardnadze, Acting Prime minister (1993)
- Otar Patsatsia, Prime minister (1993–1995)
- Niko Lekishvili, State minister (1995–1998)
- Vazha Lortkipanidze, State minister (1998–2000)
- Giorgi Arsenishvili, State minister (2000–2001)

- Abkhazia, has limited recognition: Georgia claims Abkhazia

- Presidents (complete list) –

- Vladislav Ardzinba, President (1994–2005)

- Prime ministers (complete list) –

- Vazha Zarandia, Prime minister (1992–1993)
- Sokrat Jinjolia, Prime minister (1993–1994)
- Gennadi Gagulia, Prime minister (1995–1997)
- Sergei Bagapsh, Prime minister (1997–1999)
- Viacheslav Tsugba, Prime minister (1999–2001)

- South Ossetia, has limited recognition: Georgia claims South Ossetia

- Presidents (complete list) –

- Znaur Gassiev, Head of state (1991–1992)
- Torez Kulumbegov, Head of state (1992–1993)
- Lyudvig Chibirov, Head of state (1993–2001), President (1996–2001)

- Prime ministers (complete list) –

- Oleg Teziev, Prime minister (1991–1993)
- Gerasim Khugayev, Prime minister (1993–1994)
- Feliks Zassiev, Prime minister (1994–1995)
- Vladislav Gabarayev, Prime minister (1995–1996)
- Valeriy Hubulov, Acting Prime minister (1996)
- Aleksandr Shavlokhov, Prime minister (1996–1998)
- Merab Chigoev, Prime minister (1998–2001)

== Oceania ==
=== Oceania: Australia and Papua New Guinea ===
Australia

- Australia

- Monarchs (complete list) –

- George VI, King (1936–1952)
- Elizabeth II, Queen (1952–2022)

- Prime ministers (complete list) –

- Sir Robert Menzies, Prime minister (1949–1966)
- Harold Holt, Prime minister (1966–1967)
- John McEwen, Prime minister (1967–1968)
- John Gorton, Prime minister (1968–1971)
- William McMahon, Prime minister (1971–1972)
- Gough Whitlam, Prime minister (1972–1975)
- Malcolm Fraser, Prime minister (1975–1983)
- Bob Hawke, Prime minister (1983–1991)
- Paul Keating, Prime minister (1991–1996)
- John Howard, Prime minister (1996–2007)

Papua New Guinea

- Territory of New Guinea (complete list) –

League of Nations mandate, 1946–1946; United Nations Trust Territory of Australia, 1946–1975
For details see Australia

- Territory of Papua (complete list) –

Queensland dependency, 1883–1884; British protectorate, 1884–1888; British crown colony, 1888–1902; Australian external territory, 1902–1975
For details see Australia or the United Kingdom under the British Isles, Europe

- Territory of Papua and New Guinea (complete list) –

New Guinea: United Nations Trust Territory of Australia, 1946–1975
Papua: Australian external territory, 1949–1975
For details see Australia

- Papua New Guinea

- Monarchs (complete list) –

- Elizabeth II, Queen (1975–2022)

- Prime ministers (complete list) –

- Michael Somare, Prime minister (1975–1980)
- Julius Chan, Prime minister (1980–1982)
- Michael Somare, Prime minister (1982–1985)
- Paias Wingti, Prime minister (1985–1988)
- Rabbie Namaliu, Prime minister (1988–1992)
- Paias Wingti, Prime minister (1992–1994)
- Julius Chan, Prime minister (1994–1997)
- John Giheno, Acting Prime minister (1997)
- Julius Chan, Prime minister (1997)
- Bill Skate, Prime minister (1997–1999)
- Mekere Morauta, Prime minister (1999–2002)

=== Oceania: Pacific ===
Fiji

- Colony of Fiji (complete list) –

British colony, 1874–1970
For details see the United Kingdom under British Isles, Europe

- Dominion of Fiji

- Monarchs (complete list) –

- Elizabeth II, Queen (1970–1987)

- Prime ministers (complete list) –

- Kamisese Mara, Prime minister (1970–1987)
- Timoci Bavadra, Prime minister (1987)

- Republic of Fiji

- Heads of state (complete list) –

- Sitiveni Rabuka, Head of the interim military government (1987)
- Penaia Ganilau, President (1987–1993)
- Kamisese Mara, Acting President (1993–1994), President (1994–2000)
- Frank Bainimarama, Head of the interim military government (2000)
- Josefa Iloilo, President (2000–2006)

- Prime ministers (complete list) –

- 1987 Fijian coups d'état
- Kamisese Mara, Prime minister (1987–1992)
- Sitiveni Rabuka, Prime minister (1992–1999)
- Mahendra Chaudhry, Prime minister (1999–2000)
- Tevita Momoedonu, Acting Prime minister (2000)
- 2000 Fijian coup d'état
- Laisenia Qarase, Prime minister (2000–2001)

French Polynesia

- Kings of Uvea (Wallis)

- Kapeliele Tufele III "Setu", King (1950–1953)
- Council of Ministers (1953)
- Soane Toke, King (1953)
- Aloisia Brial, King (née Tautuu), King (fem.) (1953–1958)

- Wallis and Futuna

Protectorate of France, 1887/1888–1959
Overseas territory of France, 1959–2003
- Kings of Uvea (Wallis) –

- Kapeliele Tufele III "Setu", King (1950–1953)
- Council of Ministers (1953)
- Soane Toke, King (1953)
- Aloisia Brial, King (fem.) (1953–1958)
- Tomasi Kulimoetoke II, King (1959–2007)

- Kings of Alo –

- Sagato Alofi, King (1997–2002)

- Kings of Sigave –

- Pasilio Keletaona, King (1997–2003)

Kiribati

- Kiribati (complete list) –

- Ieremia Tabai, President (1979–1982)
- Rota Onorio, Acting President (1982–1983)
- Ieremia Tabai, President (1983–1991)
- Teatao Teannaki, President (1991–1994)
- Tekiree Tamuera, Acting President (1994)
- Ata Teaotai, Acting President (1994)
- Teburoro Tito, President (1994–2003)

Marshall Islands

- Marshall Islands (complete list) –

- Amata Kabua, President (1979–1996)
- Kunio Lemari, Acting President (1996–1997)
- Imata Kabua, President (1997–2000)
- Kessai Note, President (2000–2008)

Micronesia

- Federated States of Micronesia (complete list) –

- Tosiwo Nakayama, President (1979–1987)
- John Haglelgam, President (1987–1991)
- Bailey Olter, President (1991–1996)
- Jacob Nena, President (1996–1999)
- Leo Falcam, President (1999–2003)

Nauru

- Nauru (complete list) –

- Hammer DeRoburt, President (1968–1976)
- Bernard Dowiyogo, President (1976–1978)
- Lagumot Harris, President (1978)
- Hammer DeRoburt, President (1978–1986)
- Kennan Adeang, President (1986)
- Hammer DeRoburt, President (1986)
- Kennan Adeang, President (1986)
- Hammer DeRoburt, President (1986–1989)
- Kenos Aroi, President (1989)
- Bernard Dowiyogo, President (1989–1995)
- Lagumot Harris, President (1995–1996)
- Bernard Dowiyogo, President (1996)
- Kennan Adeang, President (1996)
- Ruben Kun, President (1996–1997)
- Kinza Clodumar, President (1997–1998)
- Bernard Dowiyogo, President (1998–1999)
- René Harris, President (1999–2000)
- Bernard Dowiyogo, President (2000–2001)

New Zealand

- New Zealand

- Monarchs (complete list) –

- George VI, King (1936–1952)
- Elizabeth II, Queen (1952–2022)

- Prime ministers (complete list) –

- Sidney Holland, Prime minister (1949–1957)
- Keith Holyoake, Prime minister (1957)
- Walter Nash, Prime minister (1957–1960)
- Keith Holyoake, Prime minister (1960–1972)
- Jack Marshall, Prime minister (1972)
- Norman Kirk, Prime minister (1972–1974)
- Hugh Watt, Acting Prime minister (1974)
- Bill Rowling, Prime minister (1974–1975)
- Robert Muldoon, Prime minister (1975–1984)
- David Lange, Prime minister (1984–1989)
- Geoffrey Palmer, Prime minister (1989–1990)
- Mike Moore, Prime minister (1990)
- Jim Bolger, Prime minister (1990–1997)
- Jenny Shipley, Prime minister (1997–1999)
- Helen Clark, Prime minister (1999–2008)

- New Zealand protectorate of Niue (complete list) –

New Zealand protectorate, 1907–present
For details see the New Zealand under Oceania

- Cook Islands, state in free association

- Monarchs (complete list) –

- Elizabeth II, Queen (1952–2022)

- Prime ministers

- Terepai Maoate, Prime minister (1999–2002)

Palau

- Palau (complete list) –

- Haruo Remeliik, President (1981–1985)
- Thomas Remengesau Sr., Acting President (1985)
- Alfonso Oiterong, President (1985)
- Lazarus Salii, President (1985–1988)
- Thomas Remengesau Sr., President (1988–1989)
- Ngiratkel Etpison, President (1989–1993)
- Kuniwo Nakamura, President (1993–2001)

Samoa and American Samoa

- Malietoa dynasty –

- Malietoa Tanumafili II, Malietoa (1940–2007), O le Ao o le Malo (Head of state), held jointly with Tupua Tamasese Meaʻole (1962–1963)

- Western Samoa/ Independent State of Samoa

- Heads of state (complete list) –

- Tupua Tamasese Meaʻole, Co-O le Ao o le Malo (1962–1963)
- Malietoa Tanumafili II, O le Ao o le Malo (1962–2007)

- Prime ministers (complete list) –

- Fiamē Mataʻafa Faumuina Mulinuʻu II, Prime Minister (1959–1970)
- Tupua Tamasese Lealofi IV, Prime Minister (1970–1973)
- Fiamē Mataʻafa Faumuina Mulinuʻu II, Prime Minister (1973–1975)
- Tupua Tamasese Lealofi IV, Acting Prime minister (1975–1976)
- Tui Ātua Tupua Tamasese Efi, Prime minister (1976–1982)
- Vaʻai Kolone, Prime minister (1982)
- Tui Ātua Tupua Tamasese Efi, Prime minister (1982)
- Tofilau Eti Alesana, Prime minister (1982–1985)
- Vaʻai Kolone, Prime minister (1985–1988)
- Tofilau Eti Alesana, Prime minister (1988–1998)
- Tuila'epa Sa'ilele Malielegaoi, Prime minister (1998–2021)

Solomon Islands

- British Solomon Islands (complete list) –

British protectorate, 1893–1978
For details see the United Kingdom under British Isles, Europe

- Solomon Islands

- Monarchs (complete list) –

- Elizabeth II, Queen (1978–2022)

- Prime ministers (complete list) –

- Peter Kenilorea, Prime minister (1978–1981)
- Solomon Mamaloni, Prime minister (1981–1984)
- Peter Kenilorea, Prime minister (1984–1986)
- Ezekiel Alebua, Prime minister (1986–1989)
- Solomon Mamaloni, Prime minister (1989–1993)
- Francis Billy Hilly, Prime minister (1993–1994)
- Solomon Mamaloni, Prime minister (1994–1997)
- Bartholomew Ulufa'alu, Prime minister (1997–2000)
- Manasseh Sogavare, Prime minister (2000–2001)

Tonga

- Kingdom of Tonga (1900–70)

- Monarchs (complete list) –

- Sālote Tupou III, King (1918–1965)

- Prime ministers (complete list) –

- Tupoutoʻa-Tungi, Prime minister (1949–1965)

- Tonga

- Monarchs (complete list) –

- Tāufaʻāhau Tupou IV, King (1965–2006)

- Prime ministers (complete list) –

- Fatafehi Tu'ipelehake, Prime minister (1965–1991)
- Baron Vaea, Prime minister (1991–2000)
- Tupou VI, then known as ʻAhoʻeitu ʻUnuakiʻotonga Tukuʻaho, Prime minister (2000–2006)

Tuvalu

- Tuvalu

- Monarchs (complete list) –

- Elizabeth II, Queen (1978–2022)

- Prime ministers (complete list) –

- Toaripi Lauti, Prime minister (1978–1981)
- Tomasi Puapua, Prime minister (1981–1989)
- Bikenibeu Paeniu, Prime minister (1989–1993)
- Kamuta Latasi, Prime minister (1993–1996)
- Bikenibeu Paeniu, Prime minister (1996–1999)
- Ionatana Ionatana, Prime minister (1999–2000)
- Lagitupu Tuilimu, Acting Prime minister (2000–2001)

United States

- Trust Territory of the Pacific Islands (complete list) –

United Nations Trust Territory under the administration of the United States, 1947–1994

- Arthur W. Radford, High Commissioner (1949–1951)
- Elbert D. Thomas, High Commissioner (1951–1953)
- Frank E. Midkiff, High Commissioner (1953–1954)
- Delmas H. Nucker, Acting High Commissioner (1954–1956), High Commissioner (1954–1961)
- Maurice W. Goding, High Commissioner (1961–1966)
- William R. Norwood, High Commissioner (1966–1969)
- Edward E. Johnston, High Commissioner (1969–1976)
- Peter Tali Coleman, acting High Commissioner (1976–1977)
- Adrian P. Winkel, High Commissioner (1977–1981)
- Janet J. McCoy, High Commissioner (1981–1987)
- Charles D. Jordan, Director (1986–1991)

Vanuatu

- New Hebrides Condominium –

British-French Condominium, 1906–1980
For details see the United Kingdom under British Isles and France under western Europe

- Vanuatu

- Presidents (complete list) –

- Ati George Sokomanu, President (1984–1984)
- Frederick Karlomuana Timakata, Acting President (1984)
- Ati George Sokomanu, President (1984–1989)
- Onneyn Tahi, Acting President (1989)
- Frederick Karlomuana Timakata, President (1989–1994)
- Alfred Maseng, Acting President (1994)
- Jean-Marie Léyé, President (1994–1999)
- Edward Natapei, Acting President (1999)
- John Bani, President (1999–2004)

- Prime ministers (complete list) –

- Walter Lini, Prime minister (1980–1991)
- Donald Kalpokas, Prime minister (1991)
- Maxime Carlot Korman, Prime minister (1991–1995)
- Serge Vohor, Prime minister (1995–1996)
- Maxime Carlot Korman, Prime minister (1996)
- Serge Vohor, Prime minister (1996–1998)
- Donald Kalpokas, Prime minister (1998–1999)
- Barak Sopé, Prime minister (1999–2001)

== See also ==
- List of state leaders in the 19th century (1851–1900)
- List of state leaders in the 20th century (1901–1950)
- List of state leaders in the 2000s
- List of state leaders in the 2010s
- List of governors of dependent territories in the 20th century
