= Spouse of the prime minister of Tanzania =

Spouse of the Prime Minister of Tanzania
- Coat of arms of Tanzania
- Incumbent; Mary Majaliwa since 20 November 2015
- Residence: Dodoma City
- Inaugural holder: Sofia Kawawa Tanzania; Maria Nyerere Tanganyika
- Formation: 17 February 1972
- Salary: None

The Spouse of the Prime Minister of Tanzania is the title given to the wife or husband of the Prime Minister of Tanzania. To date it has been held by only 9 women and 2 before independence, the current holder is Mary Majaliwa.

== Public role ==
The role of the Prime Ministerial Consort is not an official office and as such they are not given a salary or official duties, however, is still generally regarded as a public figure, frequently accompanying the prime minister on campaign and other public appearances, and often hosting dignitaries at the prime minister's residence. The spouse of the Prime Minister of Tanzania frequently participates in humanitarian and charitable work.

== List of spouses of the Tanzania prime ministers ==
Name	Term begins	Term ends	Prime Minister
Maria Nyerere	1 May 1961	22 January 1962	Julius Nyerere
Sofia Kawawa	22 January 1962	8 December 1962	Rashid Kawawa
Sofia Kawawa	2 March 1972	13 February 1997	Rashid Kawawa
Napono & Nekiteto Sokoine	13 February 1977	7 November 1980	Edward Sokoine
Amne Rifai Salim	24 April 1984	5 November 1985	Salim Ahmed Salim
Evelyne Warioba	5 November 1985	9 November 1990	Joseph Warioba
Ezerina Malecela	9 November 1990	5 December 1994	John Malecela
Rhoda Msuya	7 November 1980	27 November 1995	Cleopa Msuya
Esther Sumaye	27 November 1995	30 December 2005	Frederick Sumaye
Regina Lowassa	30 December 2005	7 December 2008	Edward Lowassa
Tunu Pinda	6 January 2006	5 November 2015	Mizengo Pinda
Mary Majaliwa	20 November 2015	Current	Kassim Majaliwa

== See also ==
- Prime Minister of Tanzania
- List of prime ministers of Tanzania
