= Amir H. Jamal =

Tanzanian politician (1922–1995)

- આમિર જમાલ
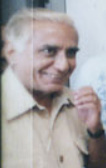

Permanent Representative of Tanzania to the United Nations Office at Geneva
- In office 1985–1993
- Appointed by: Ali Hassan Mwinyi

2nd Minister of Finance
- In office 1979–1983
- President: Julius Nyerere
- Preceded by: Edwin Mtei
- Succeeded by: Kighoma Malima
- In office 1975–1977
- President: Julius Nyerere
- Preceded by: Cleopa Msuya
- Succeeded by: Edwin Mtei
- In office 1965–1972
- President: Julius Nyerere
- Preceded by: Paul Bomani
- Succeeded by: Cleopa Msuya

Member of Parliament for Morogoro
- In office 1960–1985
- Succeeded by: Shamim Khan

Personal details
- Born: 26 January 1922 Mwanza, Tanganyika
- Died: 21 March 1995 (aged 73) Vancouver, British Columbia, Canada
- Party: CCM; TANU (1962–1977)
- Spouse(s): Zainy Kheraj; Shahsultan Cassam
- Children: 4
- Education: University of Calcutta (BCom)
- Ethnicity: Indian (Khoja)

Amir Habib Jamal (26 January 1922 – 21 March 1995) was a Tanzanian politician and diplomat who served as a Minister under various portfolios in the Julius Nyerere administration. He represented the parliamentary constituency of Morogoro from 1960 to 1985, and was Tanzania's longest-serving Finance Minister and led the ministry for about 12 years.

== Early life ==
Jamal was born in British-administered Tanganyika, which was at the time a League of Nations mandate, to Gujarati parents of Indian ancestry—Kulsum Thawer and Habib Jamal, a founding member of the Asian Association. He was educated in his hometown of Mwanza and pursued his secondary education in Dar es Salaam. He graduated from the University of Calcutta in India with a BCom in economics.

He had intended to train as a doctor at the University of Bombay but despite his high marks, he didn't get into the medical faculty. In 1942, he attended a meeting of the Indian National Congress where Mahatma Gandhi launched the Quit India Movement, demanding the immediate withdrawal of the British from India. Upon graduation, he returned to Dar es Salaam and joined the family business.

He first met Julius Nyerere in 1952 at a reception hosted by the British Council in honour of the latter's return as a graduate of Edinburgh University. He was a veteran of Tanganyika's independence movement and in 1955, "helped to pay for Nyerere's visit to the United Nations" in New York City, USA.

At first, Jamal had "leanings towards Fabian Society"; but thereafter joined the Asian Association. In 1958, he was elected to the Legislative Council. In 1962, Jamal joined the Tanganyika African National Union (TANU) as its first non-African member.

== Career ==
=== Political ===
In 1965, Jamal was appointed Minister of Finance. Two years later, the Arusha Declaration was proclaimed and the nation adopted a socialist path. Between 1972 and 1975, he was appointed Minister for Commerce and Industries; and in this capacity he initiated a number of industrial projects in Morogoro Region. He led the Finance Ministry once again between 1975 and 1977. In 1977, he became a trustee of the Dag Hammarskjöld Foundation. Following the dissolution of the former East African Community in 1977, he was transferred to the Communication and Transport docket which he led for about two years. He had an arduous task of creating new national corporations and agencies. He led the Finance Ministry for a third time between 1979 and 1983.

In 1980, he served as Chairman of the 35th Annual Meetings of the International Monetary Fund (IMF) and the World Bank Group. Upon his arrival in Washington, D.C., he was surprised when IMF staff presented him with a draft for his opening speech. He politely declined saying that he had brought his own. As Chairman, his instruction to invite the Palestine Liberation Organization as an observer to the annual meeting was refused by the World Bank President. He denounced the IMF as a relic of World War II designed to protect the West.

Between 1983 and 1984, Jamal served as Minister without Portfolio and as Minister of State for Cabinet Affairs from 1984 to 1985.

=== Diplomatic ===
In 1985, he was appointed Head of the country's Permanent Mission to the United Nations Office in Geneva.

He served as Chair of both the InterPress Service and Governing Council of the Sokoine University of Agriculture. He was also the Honorary Executive Director of the South Centre and a trustee of the Dag Hammarskjöld Foundation from 1978 to 1993.

== Personal life ==
He married twice and had three sons and one daughter. He was a member of the Khoja community and an adherent of Nizari Isma'ilism.

Jamal died on 21 March 1995 in Vancouver, British Columbia, Canada at the age of 73. According to Sophia Mustafa, Nyerere's efforts to have Jamal's remains repatriated to Tanzania were in vain. Nyerere in his tribute called him a "person of absolute integrity.. never a Yes man" and was "privileged to count him a friend". Prominent Tanzanian scholar and writer Godfrey Mwakikagile described him as "more of a technocrat than a politician".

In another one of his books, The People of Ghana: Ethnic Diversity and National Unity, in which he has also written about Nyerere's and Nkrumah's shared Pan-African commitment and uncompromising stand against racism, Godfrey Mwakikagile also states the following about Amir H. Jamal:

Amir H. Jamal was a member of Tanzania’s first independence cabinet alongside Nyerere and served as the country’s minister of finance for an extended period. He also held several other ministerial positions and maintained a close friendship with Nyerere.

A technocrat of high intellectual calibre, he was independent-minded and the best adviser Nyerere had. He had sharp political instincts but as a public servant never did anything for political expediency. His integrity was unimpeachable. I knew him when I was a news reporter."

Joan Wicken, President Nyerere's personal assistant and secretary for decades since before and after independence until Mwalimu Nyerere's death, stated the following about Amir H. Jamal:

"Amir was a key ally of Baba wa Taifa (Father of the Nation) and had more formal and informal one-to-one meetings with Baba wa Taifa than any other minister."

Clement George Kahama who, like Amir H. Jamal, was a member of the first independence cabinet and held other posts in subsequent years under President Nyerere, had this to say about Jamal:

"The late Amir Jamal was an intellectual giant who was highly respected by Mwalimu and all of us, his fellow (cabinet) ministers, for his diplomacy, down to earth-ness and outspoken approach to local and international affairs. It was always intellectually stimulating to discuss global issues with him."

Trevor Huddleston who, with Julius Nyerere when he was a young man before leading Tanganyika to independence, launched an international campaign in London in 1959 to boycott apartheid South Africa, and was himself a very close friend of Nyerere and a world-renowned opponent of the apartheid regime and a highly respected Anglican bishop, said this about Amir Jamal:

"No one in his life in politics had a closer relationship with Mwalimu Nyerere than did Amir Jamal."

== Honors and awards ==
=== Honours ===
Year	Country	Order
2014	Tanzania	The Order of Union – First Class (posthumous)

=== Honorary degrees ===
Year	University	Country	Award
1973	Uppsala University	Sweden	Doctor of Science (economics)
1980	University of Dar es Salaam	Tanzania	Honoris causa

== Gallery ==
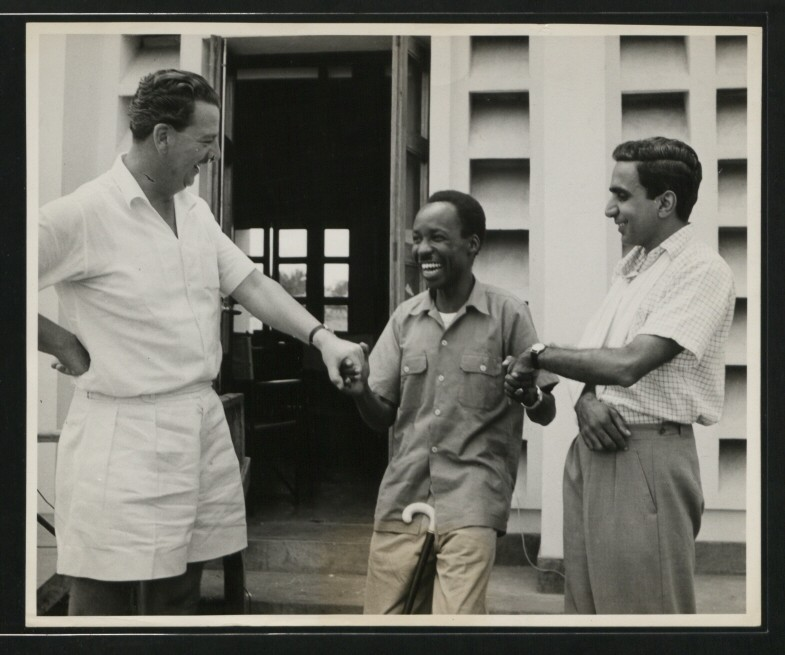
With Mwalimu Nyerere (c), 1950s

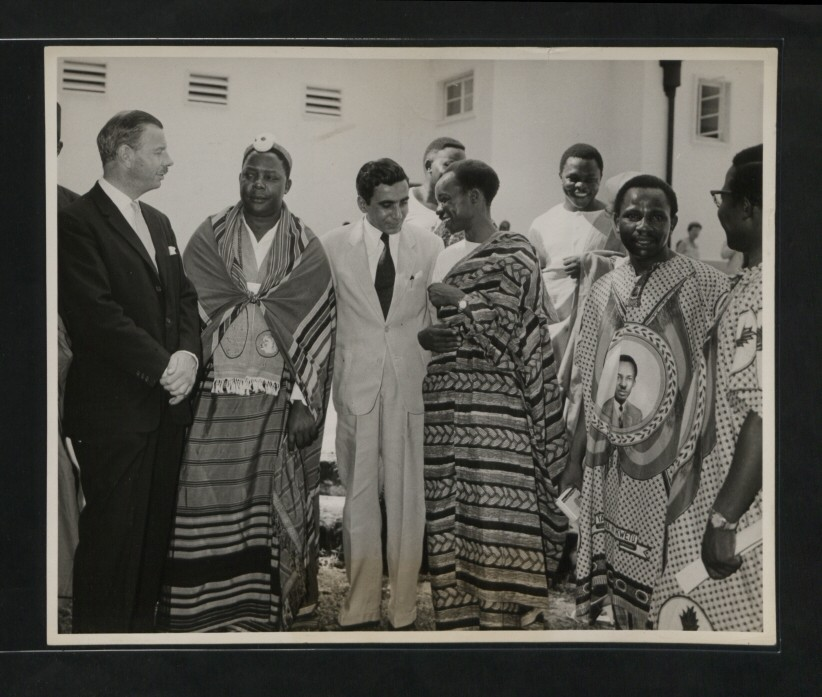
At a ceremony on the return of Chief Mkwawa's skull

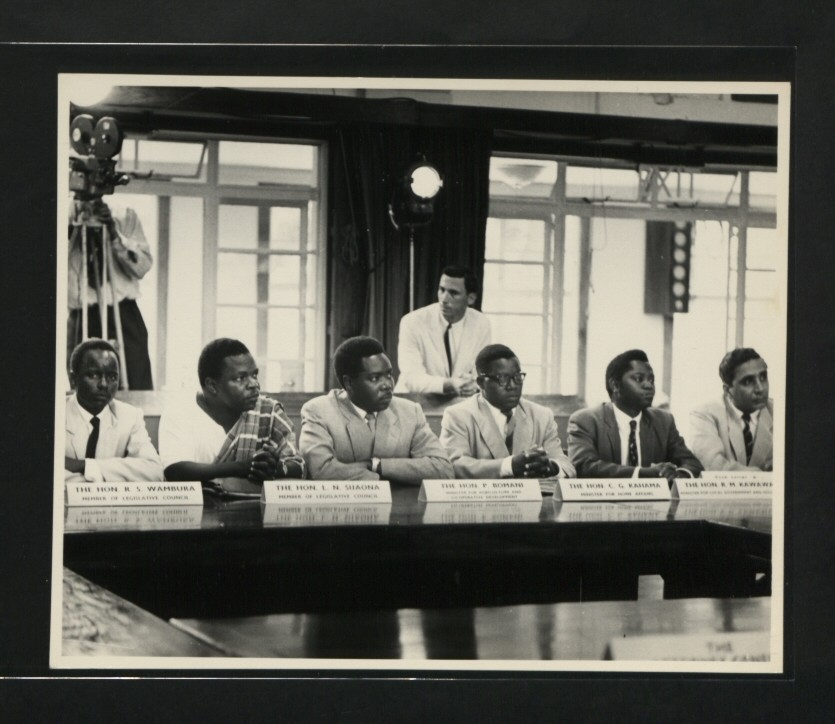
Jamal (r) at the Constitutional Conference, March 1961

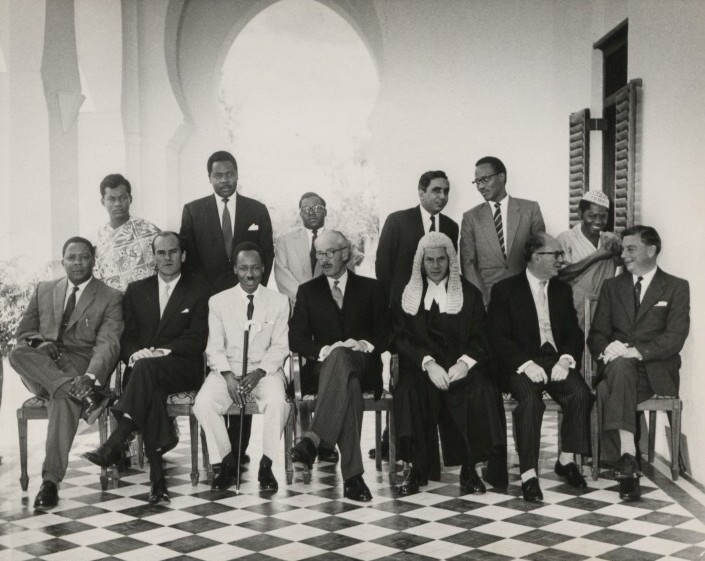
Council of Ministers, September 1960

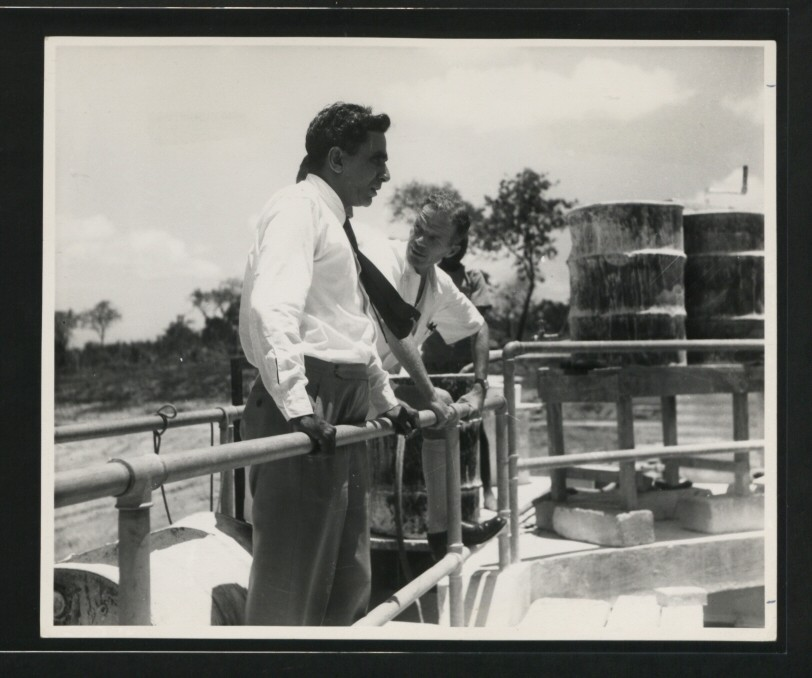
Inspecting a project

Political offices
Preceded by	Member of Parliament for Morogoro; 1960–1985	Succeeded by Shamim Khan
Preceded by –	Minister of Communication, Power and Works; 1959–1963	Succeeded by Job Lusinde
Preceded by Paul Bomani	Minister of Finance; 1965–1972	Succeeded by Cleopa Msuya
Preceded by Paul Bomani	Minister for Commerce and Industries; 1972–1975	Succeeded by Cleopa Msuya
Preceded by Cleopa Msuya	Minister of Finance and Economic Planning; 1975–1977	Succeeded by Edwin Mtei
Preceded by Job Lusinde	Minister of Communications and Transport; 1977–1979	Succeeded by Guntram Itatiro
Preceded by Edwin Mtei	Minister of Finance; 1979–1983	Succeeded by Kighoma Malima
Preceded by –	Minister without Portfolio; 1983–1984	Succeeded by –
Preceded by	Minister of State for Cabinet Affairs; 1984–1985	Succeeded by
Diplomatic posts
Preceded by	Permanent Representative of Tanzania to the United Nations Office at Geneva; 1985–1993	Succeeded by
