= Salim Ahmed Salim =

Tanzanian politician and diplomat

- سلیم احمد سلیم
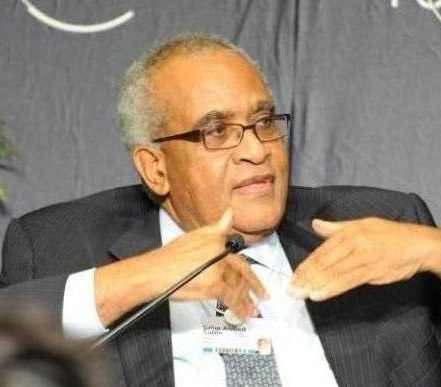
- Salim in 2010

7th Secretary General of the Organisation of African Unity
- In office 19 September 1989 – 17 September 2001
- Preceded by: Ide Oumarou
- Succeeded by: Amara Essy

Minister of Defence and National Service
- In office 1985–1989
- President: Ali Hassan Mwinyi
- Preceded by: Muhidini Kimario
- Succeeded by: Jackson Makwetta

Prime Minister of Tanzania
- In office 24 April 1984 – 5 November 1985
- President: Julius Nyerere
- Preceded by: Edward Sokoine
- Succeeded by: Joseph Warioba

8th minister for foreign affairs
- In office 1981–1984
- President: Julius Nyerere
- Preceded by: Benjamin Mkapa
- Succeeded by: Benjamin Mkapa

Permanent Representative of Tanzania to the United Nations
- In office 1970–1980
- President: Julius Nyerere

Personal details
- Born: Salim Ahmed Salim; 23 January 1942 (age 84)
- Children: 3: Maryam; Ali; Ahmed
- Education: St. Stephen's College, Delhi; SIPA, Columbia (MIA)
- Committees: Chair, Mo Ibrahim Prize selection committee
- Positions: Chancellor, HKMU; Chair, MNF

Salim Ahmed Salim (Arabic: سليم احمد سليم, Swahili: Salim Ahmad Salim, born 23 January 1942) is a Tanzanian politician and diplomat who has worked in the international diplomatic arena since the early 1960s. He served as prime minister for one year, from 1984 to 1985.

== Early life ==
Salim was born in what was then the Sultanate of Zanzibar to Sheikh Ahmed Salim Riyami, an ethnic Arab of Omani descent while his mother was a local-born mixed-descent Tanzanian, born to an ethnic Arab father and a mixed Afro-Arab mother.

== Education ==
He was educated at Lumumba College in Zanzibar and later pursued his undergraduate studies at the St. Stephen's College of the University of Delhi and obtained his master's degree in international affairs from the School of International and Public Affairs at Columbia University in New York. He became a student activist in the 1950s and was founder and first vice president of the All-Zanzibar Student Union.

== Positions held in Tanzania ==
- Chief editor of a Zanzibar daily paper, Secretary General of the All-Zanzibar Journalists Organisation 1963–1964
- Minister for Foreign Affairs 1980–1984
- Prime Minister of Tanzania 1984–1985
- Deputy Prime Minister of Tanzania 1986–1989
- Minister of Defence and National Service 1985–1989
- President of the Julius K. Nyerere Foundation 2001 – current
- Member of the Central Committee of the ruling political party in Tanzania (Chama Cha Mapinduzi).
- Member of the Tanzania Commission for Constitution Review 2012–2014

== Diplomatic positions held ==
- Deputy chief representative of the Zanzibar Office based in Havana, Cuba 1961–1962
- Tanzania Ambassador to the Arab Republic of Egypt 1964–1965
- Tanzanian High Commissioner (i.e. Ambassador) to India 1965–1968
- Tanzania Ambassador to the People’s Republic of China 1969–1970
- Permanent Representative of Tanzania to the United Nations 1970–1980
- Tanzania Ambassador to Cuba 1970–1980 (served while at the UN)
- Tanzanian High Commissioner to Guyana, Barbados, Jamaica, Trinidad and Tobago 1970–1980 (served while at the UN)
- Secretary-general of the OAU 1989–2001
- African Union special envoy on the Darfur Conflict 2004–2008

=== Positions at the United Nations ===
- June/July 1972: Chairman of the United Nations Special Mission to Niue
- August 1972: Drafting Committee of the Political Committee of the Ministerial Conference of non-Aligned States, Georgetown, Guyana
- 1972 to 1980: Chairman of the United Nations Special Committee on Decolonization (Committee of 24).
- April 1973: Chairman of the Political Committee of International Conference of Experts in Support of the Victims of Colonialism and Apartheid in Southern Africa, Oslo
- 1975: Chairman of the Security Council's Committee on Sanctions against Southern Rhodesia
- 1976: President of the United Nations Security Council
- 1979: President of the United Nations General Assembly for the Thirty-fourth, Sixth emergency special, Seventh emergency special, and Eleventh special sessions.
- 1981: President of the International Conference on Sanctions against South Africa.
- 1984: President of the Paris International Conference Against Apartheid.

=== Campaign for UN Secretary General ===
In 1981, Salim Ahmed Salim ran for Secretary-General of the United Nations against the two-term incumbent, Kurt Waldheim of Austria. Salim was then serving as President of the United Nations General Assembly, and he had the support of the Organisation of African Unity and the Non-Aligned Movement. He could also count on China to veto Waldheim in the Security Council. However, Salim was opposed by the Reagan administration in the United States, which regarded him as an anti-American radical who was hostile to South Africa and supported Palestinian statehood. The Soviet Union also opposed Salim for his activism and his pro-China stance.

Salim won the first round of voting with 11 votes to Waldheim's 10. As expected, Salim was vetoed by the United States, and Waldheim was vetoed by China. Salim's support dropped after the first round, as some countries believed that the United States was implacably opposed to Salim, while China had previously dropped its veto of Waldheim in 1971 and 1976. However, neither country would relent, as the selection deadlocked for 6 weeks over a total of 16 rounds of voting. The deadlock finally ended when Waldheim and Salim both withdrew from the race, opening up the selection to other candidates, one of whom, Javier Perez de Cuellar, a national of Peru, was able to clear all vetoes and was elected at the first round.

In 1996, Salim was again mentioned for the office. Secretary-general Boutros Boutros-Ghali was running unopposed for a second term and had the support of 14 of the 15 members of the Security Council. The United States was opposed to Boutros-Ghali and offered to support any other African candidate, including Salim Ahmed Salim. However, France made it clear that it would veto Salim, so he was not nominated.

=== Other diplomatic positions ===
At the continental level, following the invitation of the president of the African Development Bank, he has since March, 2002 been acting as African Water Ambassador whose responsibilities include advocacy, sensitization, and mobilization of support on African water issues. He also serves as:

- Chairman, Advisory Board, Institute of Security Studies (ISS) based in Pretoria, South Africa
- Chairman of the International Board of Trustees, Africa Humanitarian Action (AHI) based in Addis Ababa, Ethiopia
- Member and Chairman of the advisory board of trustees of the Institute of Peace, Leadership and Governance, Africa University, Mutare, Zimbabwe
- Member of the Panel of the Wise, a consultative body of the African Union

At international level, Salim serves on the following boards, panels and commissions:

- Co-chair, Eminent Persons Group (EPG) on Small Arms and Light Weapons (Secretariat, based in Washington DC)
- Member of the board at the Mo Ibrahim Foundation, an organisation which supports good governance and great leadership in Africa. Salim is also Chair of the Foundation’s Ibrahim Prize Committee, having taken over from the inaugural chair, Kofi Annan in 2011.
- Member of the Global Leadership Foundation, an organization which works to support democratic leadership, prevent and resolve conflict through mediation and promote good governance in the form of democratic institutions, open markets, human rights and the rule of law. It does so by making available, discreetly and in confidence, the experience of former leaders to today’s national leaders. It is a not-for-profit organization composed of former heads of government, senior governmental and international organization officials who work closely with Heads of Government on governance-related issues of concern to them.
- Member of the board of the South Centre (Secretariat based in Geneva)
- Member, Policy Advisory Commission, World Intellectual Property Organization (WIPO)
- Member of the Foundation Council, Centre for Humanitarian Dialogue based in Geneva
- Eminent Member of the Sergio Vieira de Mello Foundation

== Honours and awards ==
=== Honours ===
Order	Country	Year
Order of the Star of Africa	Liberia	1980
Order of the United Republic of Tanzania	Tanzania	1985
National Order of a Thousand Hills	Rwanda	1993
Grand Cross of the Order of Devotion	Republic of the Congo	1994
Order of Merit (Grand Officer)	Central African Republic	1994
Medal of Africa	Libyan Arab Jamahiriya	1999
National Order of the Lion (Grand Officer)	Senegal	2000
Order of the Two Niles	Sudan	2001
Ordre El-Athir	Algeria	2001
Order of Mono	Togo	2001
National Order of Mali (Commander)	Mali	2001
Order of the Companions of O. R. Tambo (Gold)	South Africa	2004
Order of the Uhuru Torch (Second Class)	Tanzania	2011
Order of Friendship	China	2019
Order of Amilcar Cabral (First Class)	Cape Verde	2023

=== Awards ===
- 2014: Son of Africa Award by the African Union

=== Honorary degrees ===
University	Country	Degree	Year
University of the Philippines Los Baños	Philippines	Doctor of Laws	1980
University of Maiduguri	Nigeria	Doctor of Humanities	1983
University of Mauritius	Mauritius	Doctor of Civil Law	1991
University of Khartoum	Sudan	Doctor of Arts in International Affairs	1995
University of Bologna	Italy	Doctor of Philosophy in International Relations	1996
University of Cape Town	South Africa	Doctor of Laws	1998
Addis Ababa University	Ethiopia	Doctor of Laws	2003

Recipient of the 2006 Martin Luther King "Drum Major for Justice" award.

Political offices
Preceded by Edward Sokoine	Prime Minister of Tanzania; 1984–1985	Succeeded by Joseph Warioba
Preceded by Benjamin William Mkapa	Minister of Foreign Affairs and International Cooperation; 1990–1993	Succeeded by Benjamin William Mkapa
Diplomatic posts
Preceded by Indalecio Liévano	President of the United Nations General Assembly; 1979–1980	Succeeded by Rüdiger von Wechmar
