= Edward Lowassa =

Tanzanian politician (1953–2024)

Right Honourable Edward Lowassa
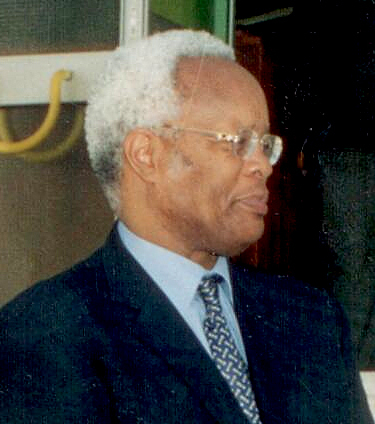

8th Prime Minister of Tanzania
- In office 30 December 2005 – 7 February 2008
- President: Jakaya Kikwete
- Preceded by: Frederick Sumaye
- Succeeded by: Mizengo Pinda

Minister of Water and Livestock Development
- In office 2000–2005
- President: Benjamin Mkapa
- Succeeded by: Stephen Wasira

Member of Parliament for Monduli
- In office November 1995 – October 2015
- Succeeded by: Julius Kalanga

Personal details
- Born: 26 August 1953 Arusha, Tanganyika Territory
- Died: 10 February 2024 (aged 70) Dar es Salaam, Tanzania
- Resting place: Ngarash village, Monduli
- Party: CCM (1977–2015); CHADEMA (2015–2019); CCM (2019–2024)
- Children: 5
- Education: University of Dar es Salaam; University of Bath (MSc)
- Website: Official Facebook profile

Military service
- Allegiance: United Rep. of Tanzania
- Branch/service: Tanzanian Army
- Battles/wars: Uganda–Tanzania War
- Awards: Nishani ya Vita

Edward Ngoyai Lowassa (26 August 1953 – 10 February 2024) was a Tanzanian politician who was Prime Minister of Tanzania from 2005 to 2008, serving under President Jakaya Kikwete. Lowassa went into record as the first Prime Minister to have been forced to resign by a fraud scandal in the history of Tanzania. Following his resignation President Kikwete was obliged to dissolve his cabinet as required by the Constitution and with minimum delay, constituted a new one under a new Prime Minister, Mizengo Pinda.

After the ruling CCM failed to select him as its candidate for the October 2015 presidential election, he left the party and stood instead as an opposition candidate. He was defeated in the election by CCM candidate John Magufuli.

== Biography ==
=== Early life ===
Edward Lowassa was the fourth child of the herdsman Ngoyai Lowassa, who worked part-time for the colonial government in Monduli District in Arusha Region as a tarish (village law enforcement).

=== Education ===
Lowassa joined Monduli Primary School (which was later renamed to Moringe Primary School) in 1961. Lowassa was the school band leader at Monduli Primary School and in 1967 he sat for the CPEE. He then went on to Arusha Secondary School in 1968 and sat for his O-Level Certificate, the CSEE in 1971. For his A-Levels, he attended Milambo Secondary School from 1972 to 1973 where he sat for his ACSEE.

Lowassa received his undergraduate degree, a BA in Fine and Performing Arts. He moved on to the University of Dar es Salaam in 1977. There, he encountered Jakaya Kikwete and John Chilligati. In 1978 he was conscripted into the army and fought in the Kagera War between Tanzania and Uganda. Lowassa then went on to earn a MSc. Development Studies from The University of Bath in the United Kingdom in 1984.

=== Career ===
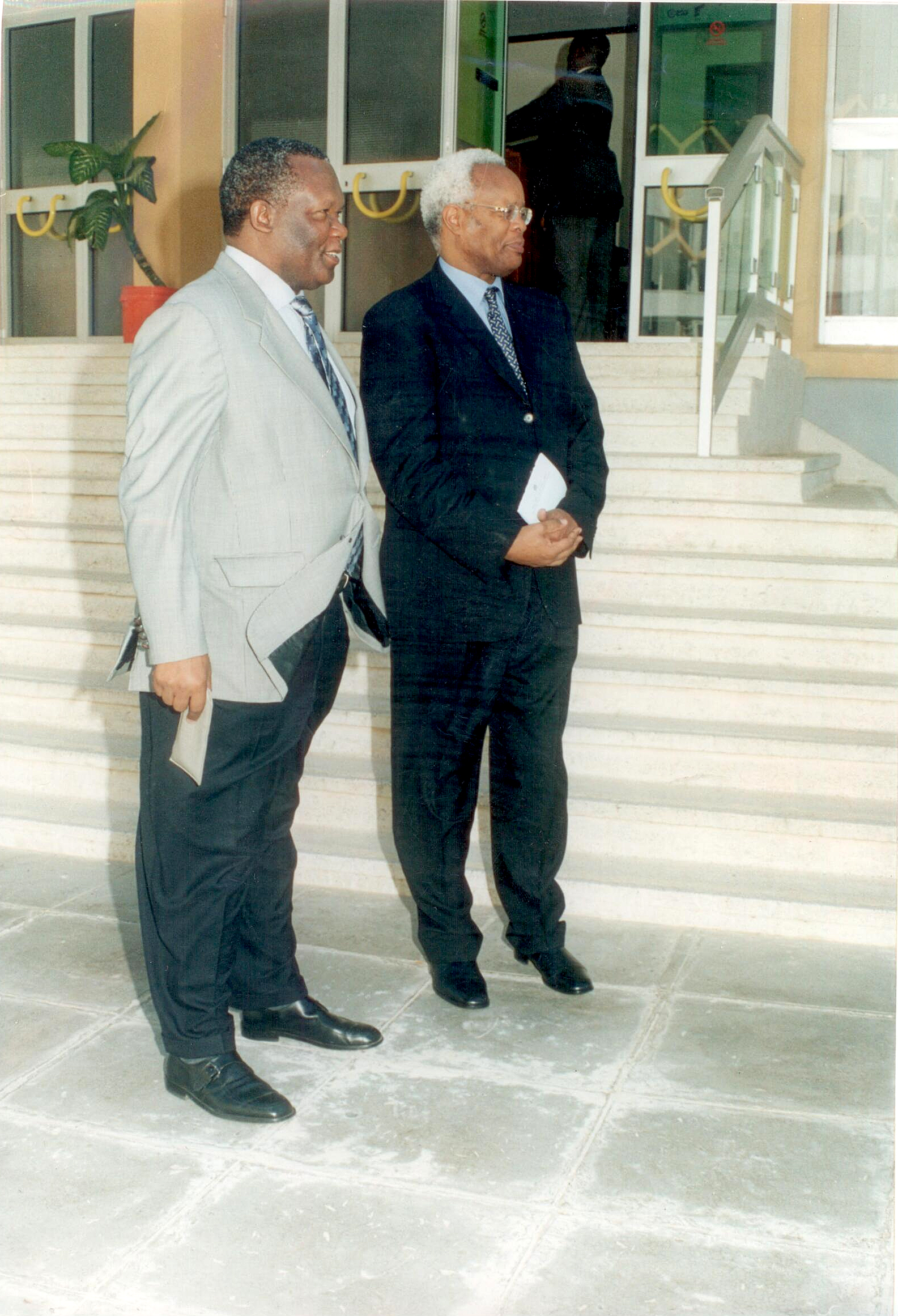
Lowassa (right).

Lowassa served as Minister of State in the Prime Minister's Office during President Ali Hassan Mwinyi's second term. He sought the nomination of Chama Cha Mapinduzi (CCM) as its presidential candidate in 1995 but was eliminated in the early stages by the former President Julius Nyerere, who strongly believed that Lowassa was not then correct material for the Presidency. He retained his parliamentary seat and became a strong backbencher in Parliament until 1997 when he was appointed Minister for State in the Vice President's Office for Environment and Poverty.

Following the 2000 general elections, he was appointed Minister of Water and Livestock Development and made his mark as a hardworking minister. In 2005 Lowassa chose not to seek the CCM presidential nomination but became a key campaigner for his long-time friend, Jakaya Kikwete, in his bid for the presidential seat.

Kikwete, running on a CCM ticket, won the elections by beating other contestants by a large margin. He received 82% of the votes. In return, President Kikwete nominated Lowassa as Prime Minister on 29 December 2005. Parliament overwhelmingly confirmed the nomination, with 312 votes in favour and two opposed, and Lowassa was sworn in on 30 December. Lowassa had an extensive background in both parliamentary and government affairs.

== Richmond corruption scandal ==
On 7 February 2008, Lowassa was forced to resign after being implicated in the Richmond Energy deal corruption scandal. This followed a parliamentary select committee report on an emergency power generation contract between the Tanzania Electric Supply Company Ltd (TANESCO), a public corporation, and a US company styled Richmond Development Company LLC of Houston, Texas. The five-member select committee, headed by Kyela MP, Dr. Harrison Mwakyembe, found the contract to have been fraudulently concluded, hence unconscionable. Richmond was contracted to provide 100 megawatts of electricity each day after a drought early in 2006 but the Richmond generators arrived late and did not work as expected. In spite of this, the government paid Richmond more than $100,000 a day. Lowassa's office then influenced the government's decision to extend Richmond's contract despite advice to the contrary from TANESCO. Two other cabinet ministers who had held the energy portfolio, Dr. Ibrahim Msabaha and Nazir Karamagi were forced to resign as well.

Lowassa however denied that his office was involved in improperly awarding a contract to US-based electricity company Richmond Development in 2006.

== Presidential aspirations ==
In 1995, Lowassa was among the more than 15 CCM aspirants for the presidency, but he was stopped in his tracks by retired president Julius Nyerere, who found him to have enriched himself too fast. Lowassa was eliminated by Nyerere's fiat and that contest within the party was eventually won by Benjamin Mkapa, who also won the election and became Tanzania's third president.

In 2005, Lowassa strongly backed his friend Jakaya Kikwete and the two were dubbed "Boys Two Men" because of their strong political union that eventually enabled Kikwete to defeat all his rivals within the ruling party.

In 2014, Lowassa faced a one-year ban from CCM after he was accused of starting his campaign for presidency ahead of the authorized time. The ban expired in February 2015, only to be extended by the CCM Central Committee on the grounds that their final report was still not ready.

In May 2015, Lowassa eventually launched his presidential campaign in Arusha. He stated that his top priorities would be overhauling the country's education sector, reducing poverty, boosting economic growth and fighting corruption.

On 11 July 2015, the CCM Central Committee eliminated Lowassa from its list of presidential aspirants. CCM shortlisted January Makamba, Bernard Membe, Asha-Rose Migiro, John Magufuli and Amina Salum Ali for the National Executive Committee (NEC) vote of 378 members. The elimination of Lowassa came as a shock to many who viewed him as an inevitable candidate.

Having failed to get the nomination, Lowassa denounced the CCM as "infested with leaders who are dictators, undemocratic and surrounded with greedy power mongers." He left the party and instead joined Chadema, an opposition party. On 4 August 2015, he was designated as the presidential candidate of a coalition of four opposition parties, including Chadema. On 1 March 2019 Lowassa left Chadema and rejoined the CCM.

== Positions held ==
Lowassa held various positions in the government since the late 1980s:

- Managing Director of the Arusha International Conference Centre, 1989–1990
- Minister for State, Prime Minister's Office and First Vice President (Judiciary & Parliamentary Affairs), 1990–1993
- Minister of Lands, Human Settlement Development,1993–1995
- Minister for State — Environment & Poverty, Vice President's Office, 1997–2000
- Minister of Water and Livestock Development, 2000–2005
- Member of Parliament for Monduli Constituency, 1990–2015
- Prime Minister, 2005–2008

== Death ==
Edward Lowassa died after a long illness at the Jakaya Kikwete Cardiac lnstitute (JKCI) in Dar es Salaam, on 10 February 2024. He was 70. Vice president Philip Mpango announced Lowassa's death live on national television.

Preceded by Frederick Sumaye	Prime Minister of Tanzania; 2005–2008	Succeeded by Mizengo Pinda
