= Mohamed Gharib Bilal =

Tanzanian politician (born 1945)

Dr Mohamed Bilal
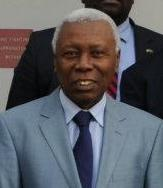

9th Vice President of Tanzania
- In office 6 November 2010 – 5 November 2015
- President: Jakaya Kikwete
- Preceded by: Ali Mohamed Shein
- Succeeded by: Samia Suluhu

4th Chief Minister of Zanzibar
- In office October 1995 – November 2000
- President: Salmin Amour
- Preceded by: Omar Ali Juma
- Succeeded by: Shamsi Vuai Nahodha

Permanent Secretary at the Ministry of Science, Technology and Higher Education
- In office 1990–1995
- President: Ali Hassan Mwinyi

Personal details
- Born: 6 February 1945 (age 81) Unguja, Zanzibar
- Party: CCM
- Spouse: Zakia
- Children: 4
- Education: Howard University; UC Berkeley (M.A.), (Ph.D.)
- Profession: Nuclear scientist
- Positions: Lecturer, UDSM (1976-90)

Mohamed Gharib Bilal (born 6 February 1945) is a Tanzanian politician who was Chief Minister of Zanzibar from 1995 to 2000. He was Vice President of Tanzania from 2010 to 2015. He is a nuclear scientist by profession and also served as Permanent Secretary at the Ministry of Science, Technology and Higher Education from 1990 to 1995.

== Early life and career ==
Dr Bilal completed his primary education at Makunduchi, Zanzibar in modern-day Kusini District of Unguja South Region in 1958 and attended his secondary education at Beit-el-Ras in 1962 and later joined Lumumba Secondary School in Zanzibar. Before completing Form Five, Dr Bilal received a scholarship to study physics at Howard University in Washington, graduating in physics and mathematics in 1967. He earned an MA in physics from the University of California, Berkeley in 1969, and a PhD in physics in 1976. Later the same year he joined the University of Dar es Salaam as a lecturer in physics. In 1983 he was elected head of the Department of Nuclear Physics.

In 1983 he participated to establish a national organization of radiation and contribute professional the preparation of draft of legislation which led to the law of use and control of the nuclear radiation in Tanzania.

In 1988 he was appointed head of the Faculty of Science at the University of Dar es Salaam and continue in office until 1990 when he was appointed Permanent Secretary in the new Ministry of Science Technology and Higher Education in 1990–1995.

As secretary-general he was involved in starting the process of sharing the costs of higher education and the introduction of credit. Also, the ministry introduced the Open University, along with establishing control over higher education institutions (accreditation council).

In 1988 Dr Bilal was a project initiator in Zanzibar's science camp aimed at motivating young people studying science and to help all secondary schools in Zanzibar (Unguja and Pemba) Getting equipment to facilitate testing of students to understand science more practical.

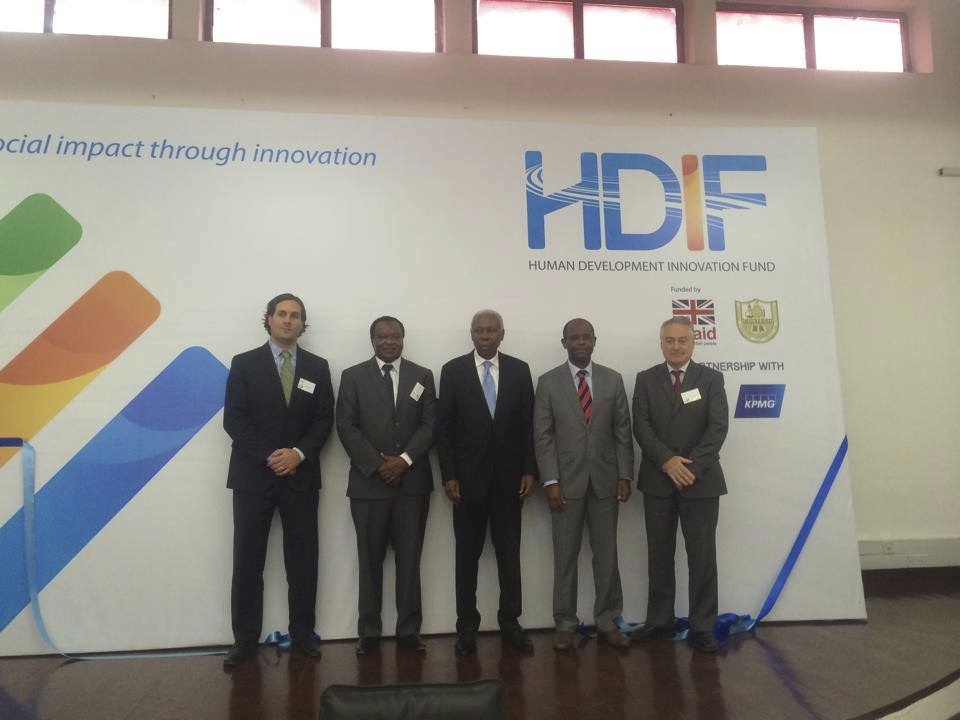
Bilal (centre).

The project eventually was adopted by the Ministry of Education in Zanzibar. The project encouraged many young people to study science and give them the challenge of learning many different topics about Zanzibar environment.

As a teacher of the University Dr Bilal was able to participate in a board far away, such as the Commission of Science and Technology (COSTECH), Commission of radiation (NRC), chairman of the science panel of the Inter University Council of East Africa and also participated pioneering studies on environmental science (1990).

Mohammed Gharib Bilal got an opportunity to attend seminars and short courses in various professions, for example, seminars of [atomic agency] ([IAEA]) in 1980 Kwabena, Ghana. 1984/85. Fellowship University of Singapore. Also attended sessions each year with the organization of Atomic. Currently he sits on the board of the International Science Programme.

== Political career ==
In 1995 Dr. Mohammed Gharib Bilal was appointed Chief Minister of the Revolutionary Government of Zanzibar until 2000.

Dr Bilali has been serving in various positions at Chama Cha Mapinduzi such as a main board member of National Executive Committee since 1995 and has been Lord of Regional and Urban West Coast Region. From November 2010 to November 2015, he was the Vice President of Tanzania, assisting President Jakaya Kikwete.

== Honours and awards ==
=== Honours ===
Year	Country	Order
2024	Tanzania	Order of the Uhuru Torch (2nd class)
