= Warioba Commission =

The Presidential Commission Against Corruption (PCAC), commonly known as the Warioba Commission, was formed during his tenure by former Tanzanian President Benjamin Mkapa on 17 January 1996, as a way of fulfilling his election pledge to fight corruption in the country. The commission was chaired by former Prime Minister, Joseph Warioba.

The commission was formed to carry out diagnostic studies on corruption in the country as part of the Tanzanian Government strategy in enhancing integrity and accountability. It completed its work on 7 December 1996 after reviewing statutes, rules and procedures in Government and identifying loopholes for growth of corruption. The findings were published in "The Report of the Presidential Commission of Inquiry Against Corruption", commonly known as "The Warioba Report".

Amongst other things, the Commission found that in the social services delivery sector, some public servants receive bribes as a means of supplementing their meager incomes, which in turn helped them to meet their financial obligations (petty corruption). The other type of corruption highlighted was "grand corruption", which involves high-level official and public servants who engage in corrupt practices because of their excessive greed for accumulation of wealth.

To remedy the problem of corruption, the commission made comprehensive recommendations touching all government ministries and departments.
