= John Malecela =

Tanzanian politician (born 1934)

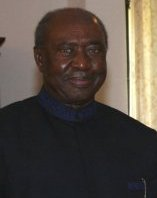
- Malecela in 2009

6th Prime Minister of Tanzania
- In office 9 November 1990 – 5 December 1994
- President: Ali Hassan Mwinyi
- Preceded by: Joseph Warioba
- Succeeded by: Cleopa Msuya

First Vice President of Tanzania
- In office 9 November 1990 – 5 December 1994
- President: Ali Hassan Mwinyi
- 2nd Vice President: Salmin Amour
- Preceded by: Joseph Warioba
- Succeeded by: Cleopa Msuya

5th Minister of External Affairs
- In office 1972–1974
- Preceded by: Israel Elinewinga
- Succeeded by: Ibrahim Kaduma

Chancellor of Open University of Tanzania
- President: Benjamin Mkapa
- Preceded by: Basil Mramba
- Succeeded by: Asha-Rose Migiro

Personal details
- Born: 19 April 1934 (age 91) Dodoma, Tanganyika
- Party: CCM
- Spouse: Anne Malecela
- Children: Mwele Ntuli Malecela

John Samuel Malecela (born 19 April 1934) was Prime Minister of Tanzania from November 1990 to December 1994. He served as the vice-chairman of the CCM from 1995 to 2007, and is a current member of the CCM Central Committee.

Malecela headed the Tanzanian delegation which participated in the first Tokyo International Conference on African Development in October 1993.

== Education ==
- Secondary Education - Minaki secondary school 1957–58
- Bachelor of Commerce - Bombay University 1958–59
- Post Graduate Studies - Cambridge University 1961–62
- Ph.D. Honoris Causa (Humanities) - University of Texas 1977

== Positions held ==
- Tanzanian Permanent Representative to the United Nations - 1964-68
- Tanzanian Ambassador to Ethiopia and the OAU - 1967
- Minister of Foreign Affairs - 1972-73
- Communication and Transport - 1973-74
- Mineral Resources and Agriculture - 1975
- Minister in the East African Community - 1975-76
- Regional Commissioner of Iringa - 1980-84
- Member and vice-president of the Maitland Commission (ITU) - 1983–84
- Member of the Group of Eminent Persons of the Commonwealth on South African situation - 1985
- Tanzanian High Commissioner to the United Kingdom - 1989-90
- Prime Minister and First Vice President 1990-94
- Vice Chairman of the ruling Party, Chama cha Mapinduzi (CCM) - 1995-2007
- Member of Parliament for Mtera - 1990-2010
- Former Chancellor of The Open University of Tanzania (OUT)

== Honours and awards ==
=== Honours ===
Year	Country	Order
2024	Tanzania	Order of the Uhuru Torch (2nd class)

== Notes ==
Political offices
Preceded by Joseph Sinde Warioba	Prime Minister of Tanzania; 1990–1994	Succeeded by Cleopa David Msuya
Preceded by Joseph Sinde Warioba	Vice President of Tanzania; 1990–1994	Succeeded by Cleopa David Msuya
