= Omar Ali Juma =

Tanzania politician (1941–2001)

Honorable Dr Omar Ali Juma

7th Vice President of Tanzania
- In office 23 November 1995 – 4 July 2001
- President: Benjamin Mkapa
- Preceded by: Cleopa Msuya (as First Vice President); Salmin Amour (as Second Vice President)
- Succeeded by: Ali Mohamed Shein

3rd Chief Minister of Zanzibar
- In office 25 January 1988 – 1 November 1995
- President: Idris Abdul Wakil; Salmin Amour
- Preceded by: Seif Sharif Hamad
- Succeeded by: Mohamed Gharib Bilal

Personal details
- Born: 26 June 1941 Sultanate of Zanzibar
- Died: 4 July 2001 (aged 60)
- Resting place: Zanzibar
- Party: Chama Cha Mapinduzi
- Education: Moscow State University

Omar Ali Juma (26 June 1941 – 4 July 2001) was Chief Minister of Zanzibar from 25 January 1988 to October 1995. From 1995 to 2001, he served as Vice President of Tanzania.

== Life and career ==
Attended primary school education between 1949 and 1957 at Chake-Chake Boys' School. From 1957 to 1960, he was at Euan Smith Secondary School (now Haile Selassie Secondary School) where he attained an Ordinary Level School Certificate. In 1960, he joined the Moscow State University and was awarded with an Advanced Level Certificate in 1962 and seven years later, at the same college, he attained a bachelor's degree in Veterinary Medicine and Surgery. For a year from 1969, he was at Cairo University for a post graduate certificate in Animal Production and Health. In 1976, he attended a one-year course for a Postgraduate Diploma in Tropical Veterinary Medicine at the University of Edinburgh. In 1982, he joined the University of Florida in the United States for a short course in Veterinary Science and two years later he attended University of Reading for a Livestock Economics course, from which he joined the Kivukoni Ideological College in Tanzania.

== Appointments ==
- 1967–1969: Assistant Veterinary Officer, Zanzibar
- 1969–1970: Veterinary Officer in charge of Pemba
- 1970–1971: Senior Veterinary Officer
- 1971–1972: Livestock Officer
- 1972–1978: Chief Veterinary Officer
- 1978–1984: Director, Livestock Department
- 1984–1988: Principal Secretary, Ministry of Agriculture and Livestock Development
- 1988–1995: Chief Minister, Zanzibar Revolutionary Government
- 1995–2001: Elected Vice President of the United Republic of Tanzania

Political offices
Preceded by Cleopa Msuya	Vice President of Tanzania; 1995–2001	Succeeded by Ali Mohamed Shein
