= Edward Sokoine =

Tanzanian politician (1938–1984)

Prime Minister of Tanzania
- In office 23 February 1983 – 12 April 1984
- President: Julius Nyerere
- Preceded by: Cleopa Msuya
- Succeeded by: Salim Ahmed Salim
- In office 13 February 1977 – 7 November 1980
- President: Julius Nyerere
- Preceded by: Rashidi Kawawa
- Succeeded by: Cleopa Msuya

Personal details
- Born: 1 August 1938 Monduli, Tanganyika
- Died: 12 April 1984 (aged 45) Morogoro, Tanzania
- Party: CCM
- Other political affiliations: Tanganyika African National Union

Edward Moringe Sokoine (1 August 1938 – 12 April 1984) was a Tanzanian politician who served two terms as Prime Minister of Tanzania, from 13 February 1977 to 7 November 1980 and again from 24 February 1983 to 12 April 1984.

== Life and career ==
In 1938, Sokoine was born in Monduli, Arusha Region, Tanzania. From 1948 to 1958, he had his Primary and Secondary Education in the towns of Monduli and Umbwe. In 1961, he joined the Tanganyika African National Union (TANU), after he took studies in administration in the Federal Republic of Germany (1962–1963). When he returned from Germany, he became District Executive Officer of the Maasai District, then he was elected to the National Assembly for the Maasai Constituency. In 1967 he became Deputy Minister of Communication, Transportation and Labour. The next step in his career was the promotion to the Minister of State in 1970. In 1972, he switched to the post of the Minister of Defence and National Service of Tanzania. In 1975, he was elected to the National Assembly again, this time for Monduli. Two years later, he became a member of the Central Committee of the ruling party Chama Cha Mapinduzi (CCM). In the same year (1977) began his first term in office as Prime Minister of the United Republic of Tanzania.

Following the outbreak of hostilities with Uganda in November 1978, Sokoine ordered Tanzania's regional commissioners to marshal all military and civilian resources for war. On 23 January 1979 he toured the Ugandan town of Mutukula following its capture by Tanzanian forces. In April 1979 Sokoine went to Nairobi and met with Kenyan President Daniel arap Moi. He attempted to convince Moi to halt the flow of Libyan military aid through the country to Uganda, but was rebuffed. Tanzania eventually won the war. Sokoine joined Nyerere and other high officials on 26 July 1979 at Kaboya Military Cemetery in Muleba District to pay their respects to Tanzania's dead soldiers. Sokoine had gone many days without sleep during the conflict and was left in ill health by its end. Tanzania also entered a post-war economic recession. In 1980 Sokoine offered his resignation to Nyerere and left the premiership.

Sokoine became Prime Minister again in 1983. He stayed just one year in office, till his death in April 1984, in a car accident.

== Death ==
Sokoine died on 12 April 1984 at the age of 45 in Morogoro when his car collided with another vehicle driven by an ANC cadre on the road from Dodoma to Dar es Salaam. His assistant was seriously injured and his driver suffered a broken leg. Sokoine was the most likely successor to Julius Nyerere as the president of Tanzania after, Nyerere declared his intentions to retire in 1985.

Sokoine's body was flown to Dar es Salaam and brought to the State House. The Nyerere family was drastically shaken by the incident and ordered to have a grand funeral. The body was on display for public viewing at Karimjee Hall for a day. This was the largest funeral Tanzania had ever hosted and the government was overwhelmed by the number of mourners present. His body was later flown to Arusha for a proper funeral.

=== Conspiracy theories ===
There were many conspiracy theories that were floated with regards to the death of Sokoine. Many people were in shock by the death of the prime minister and considered his death was foul play due to the lack of investigation into his death. The timing of the death raised many eyebrows within the community as he was destined to become the next president after Nyerere's retirement just one year after his death. People believe, that corrupt officials in the government plotted his death to avoid trial once he assumed office. Often roads are cleared for high level officials on the road and many see the fact that there was an oncoming vehicle on the road as an anomaly. Though the chance of foul play was out ruled in the case, the lack of further investigation by the authorities fueled further conspiracy theories.

== Legacy ==
=== Eponyms ===
- Sokoine University of Agriculture
- Sokoine Stadium

== Works cited ==
- Avirgan, Tony; Honey, Martha (1983). War in Uganda: The Legacy of Idi Amin. Dar es Salaam: Tanzania Publishing House. ISBN 978-9976-1-0056-3.
- Kigadye, Albert Ndayagilante (1984). Edward Moringe Sokoine: kiongozi wa watu aliyejitolea (in Swahili). Dar es Salaam: Black Star Agencies. OCLC 34628346.
- Legum, Colin, ed. (1980). Africa Contemporary Record : Annual Survey and Documents : 1978–1979. Vol. XI. New York: Africana Publishing Company. ISBN 978-0-8419-0160-5.
- Mmbando, S. I. (1980). The Tanzania-Uganda War in Pictures. Dar es Salaam: Longman Tanzania. ISBN 978-0-582-78534-2.
- Swebe, B. S. (1984). Edward Moringe Sokoine. Tanzania News Agency. ISBN 9789976940015.

Preceded by Rashidi Kawawa	Prime Minister of Tanzania; 1977-1980	Succeeded by Cleopa David Msuya
Preceded by Cleopa David Msuya	Prime Minister of Tanzania; 1983-1984	Succeeded by Salim Ahmed Salim
