= Tanzania and the International Monetary Fund =

Tanzania is a member of the International Monetary Fund (IMF) with a current quota of US$551.35 million (397.8 million SDR), and is a part of the South Africa and Nigeria led constituency with a totaling voting share of 2.97%. The IMF has been involved in Tanzania's economy since the 1970s. Over the years, there have been roughly three stages of the IMF's involvement in Tanzania: the first round of reform lasted from 1986 to 1995, the second round of reform lasted from 1996 to 2006, and the third round focused mainly on consolidating the reforms made from previous stages.

The agricultural economy depended on by Tanzania was constantly declining since the 1970s. In 1979, the IMF interfered and proposed a series of major changes to Tanzania in response to its worsening economy; currency devaluation was the main focus of the proposed changes. However, Tanzania refused to devaluate its currency and requested the IMF to leave the country in November 1979. What was more surprising was that when Tanzania expelled the IMF from the country, its economy was already at the edge of bankruptcy. The IMF created the Tanzania Advisory Group (TAG) to improve the relationship between the IMF and Tanzania—the main goal of the TAG was to achieve the devaluation of the Shilling. The TAG's efforts had virtually no return until 1986 when Ali Hassan Mwinyi, the new president of Tanzania replaced Julius Nyerere, the former president of Tanzania; however, the country's economy was already close to complete collapse.

== First round of reform, 1986–1996 ==
In 1986, Tanzania finally entered into a stand-by agreement with the IMF; under this agreement, a program was enacted to liberalize interest rate, eliminate price control, unify exchange rate etc. One important factor to understand was that, at that time, the relationship between the IMF and Tanzania was still not in good shape; with that being said, the amount of aid provided by the stand-by agreement was not a lot as it accounted only 60% of Tanzania's quota at that time. The main purpose behind this agreement was mainly to reconstruct investors’ confidence in Tanzania by providing the country with an IMF's approval. Successfully, this agreement achieved its goal as many developed countries were willing to provide aids to Tanzania if the country followed the proposed reforms listed under the agreement. From the US$78.5 million (64.2 million SDR) approved by the agreement, only 55.6 million (45.47 million SDR) was withdrawn. The first round of reform came to an end in 1996, and Tanzania achieved most of the reforms during this duration of time.

== Second round of reform, 1996–2006 ==
From 1996 to 2006, the second round of reform started. The second reform focused on areas like improving government financial services as well as strengthening the goals achieved from the previous reform. One of the most difficult policy goal was the restructuring of the parastatals; under the Poverty Reduction and Growth Facility (PRGF) programs implemented by the IMF, Tanzania successfully privatized most of the parastatals in manufacturing and agricultural sectors in 2005 (see Table A3). As for the financial sector, a joint IMF–World Bank Financial Sector Assessment Program was approved to provide Tanzania with comprehensive and analytical support for better financial development. Under this program, Tanzania received great support from donor countries and eventually unlocked the HIPC and MDRI debt relief to eliminate its existing debt.

== PSI ERA 2006 onwards ==
The third round of reform focused mainly on creating fit policies to accommodate the economic reforms brought forth by the previous two reforms. From 2006 and on, the IMF's interference switched to providing the country with policy advice. Under the operation of the Policy Support Instrument (PSI), the IMF continues to provide the country with economic advice fostering better economic growth rate and improving the situation of poverty. As we can see from the IMF record, starting since 2003, the amount of loan to Tanzania approved by the IMF was only US$29.1 million, and in 2007, only the PSI was in operation and no loan was included. This greatly signals that the IMF has assumed a more passive role as a policy advisor in the case of Tanzania. From the 2017 policy report of Tanzania, the IMF stated that the economy of Tanzania, with the implementation of the PSI-supported program, is looking strong with a moderate level of inflation.
