= Death and state funeral of John Magufuli =

2021 death and state funeral of the President of Tanzania

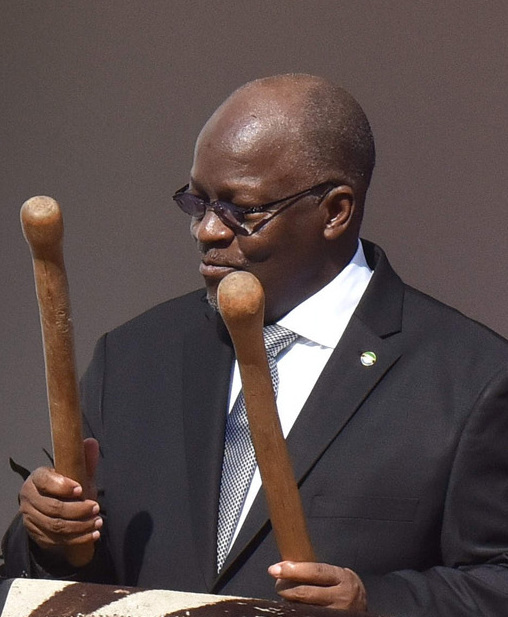
- Magufuli in 2016
- Date: 17–26 March 2021
- Venue: Uhuru Stadium, Dar es Salaam (lying-in-state); Jamhuri Stadium, Dodoma (state funeral)

John Magufuli, the 5th President of Tanzania, died on 17 March 2021 following a prolonged illness. He was the first Tanzanian president to die in office. Prior to his death, rumours speculated that he had contracted COVID-19 following months of denial during the ongoing pandemic.

== Background ==
Magufuli was first elected president in the 2015 general election. He was re-elected in 2020, amid accusations of electoral fraud from the opposition.

=== COVID-19 pandemic in Tanzania ===
Magufuli promoted COVID-19 misinformation and misinformation related to vaccination during the pandemic in Tanzania. Magufuli spoke against the possibility of closing churches, stating: "That's where there is true healing. Corona is the devil and it cannot survive in the body of Jesus," reported The Economist in March 2020.

By May 2020, Magufuli and Dar es Salaam regional commissioner Paul Makonda announced that the disease had been defeated by national prayer, and called for a public celebration. "The corona disease has been eliminated thanks to God", Magufuli told the church congregation in Dodoma, the country's capital. The World Health Organization (WHO) has questioned the government's approach to COVID-19.

Magufuli said in a January 2021 speech: "Vaccinations are dangerous. If white people were able to come up with vaccinations, a vaccination for AIDS would have been found." Instead, Magufuli urged steam inhalation and herbal medicine, neither of which is approved by the WHO for the treatment of COVID-19. However, Magufuli partially changed his position in the next month. After months of discouraging their use, he publicly asked Tanzanians to put on face masks as a precautionary measure against COVID-19. At the same time, he conditioned that only Tanzanian-made masks should be used.

== Health rumours and death ==
Magufuli had not been seen in public since 27 February 2021 and rumours swirled online that he was sick and possibly incapacitated from illness. A Kenyan newspaper reported on 10 March 2021 that "an African leader" was being treated for COVID-19 at a hospital in Nairobi, leading to speculation that it could be President Magufuli. Opposition politician Tundu Lissu, citing unnamed sources but without providing evidence, said it was Magufuli who was hospitalised, having contracted COVID-19. He further claimed that there were plans to move Magufuli to India. Lissu later claimed that Magufuli had died by 10 March.

By 15 March, four people were arrested by police on suspicion of spreading rumours on Magufuli's health via social media.

On the night of 17 March 2021, vice-president Samia Suluhu Hassan announced Magufuli had died at 6 p.m. EAT (15:00 UTC) at Emilio Mzena Memorial Hospital in Dar es Salaam, where he was receiving treatment. She did not specify Magufuli's underlying illness but said that he had suffered from chronic atrial fibrillation for more than a decade. She announced 14 days of national mourning and said that flags would fly at half-staff nationwide. Despite Suluhu's focus on Magufuli's heart problems, speculation continued that he had died from COVID-19.

== Aftermath and state funeral ==
Suluhu was sworn in as the 6th President of Tanzania on 19 March 2021, becoming its first female president. Within four months of taking office, she formed a COVID-19 advisory committee and took steps to initiate a vaccination campaign in the country. She was expected to serve out the remainder of Magufuli's five-year term.

Magufuli's body lay in state at Uhuru Stadium in Dar es Salaam on 20 March 2021. The next day, mourners hoping to view his body crowded into the stadium, many climbing a wall, which collapsed, resulting in a human stampede that left at least forty-five people dead.

Magufuli's state funeral took place on 22 March 2021, at the Jamhuri Stadium in Dodoma. It was attended by presidents Uhuru Kenyatta of Kenya, Cyril Ramaphosa of South Africa, Lazarus Chakwera of Malawi, Mokgweetsi Masisi of Botswana, Edgar Lungu of Zambia, Emmerson Mnangagwa of Zimbabwe, Filipe Nyusi of Mozambique, Azali Assoumani of the Comoros and Félix Tshisekedi of the Democratic Republic of the Congo, who delivered eulogies at the funeral. Rwandan prime minister Édouard Ngirente also attended, on behalf of president Paul Kagame. Many Tanzanian attendees and politicians did not wear face masks at the service.

Magufuli was buried in his hometown of Chato on 26 March 2021.

== Reactions ==
=== Domestic ===
A secretary of Magufuli's Chama Cha Mapinduzi (CCM) party, Humphrey Polepole, paid homage to him in a tweet, saying that he "fought the good fight, finished the race, kept the faith". The leader of the Alliance for Change and Transparency party, Zitto Kabwe, described his death as a situation "that will move us all in very personal ways", and offered his "deepest condolences to Janet Magufuli and the whole family of John Pombe Magufuli". Former prime minister Frederick Sumaye also paid tribute.

Meanwhile, activist Fatma Karume criticised Magufuli's legacy on Twitter, writing that she was "grateful and proud that I kept my HUMANITY even when evil was the order of the day. Thank you to all who made these 5 years bearable."

=== International ===
Foreign leaders and luminaries expressed their condolences, including Ethiopian President Sahle-Work Zewde and Prime Minister Abiy Ahmed, President of Burundi Évariste Ndayishimiye, President of Togo Faure Gnassingbé, Queen Elizabeth II and Prime Minister of the United Kingdom Boris Johnson, Chinese paramount leader Xi Jinping and King Mohammed VI of Morocco. Also paying tribute were former President of Nigeria Goodluck Jonathan, Ugandan opposition politician Bobi Wine and Venezuelan minister of foreign affairs Jorge Arreaza.

A statement from the United States Department of State said the country remained "committed to continuing to support Tanzanians as they advocate for respect for human rights and fundamental freedoms, and work to combat the COVID-19 pandemic. We hope that Tanzania can move forward on a democratic and prosperous path". Commonwealth Secretary-General Patricia Scotland said she was "profoundly saddened" to hear of Magufuli's death. The Chairperson of the African Union Commission, Moussa Faki, hailed the president as "a champion of regional cooperation in the East African region and a committed Pan Africanist leader".

Outside of Tanzania, a total of nine countries declared a period of national mourning following his death.

Country	Duration
Uganda	14 days
Rwanda	9 days
Kenya	7 days
Burundi	7 days
Mozambique	5 days
Democratic Republic of the Congo	3 days
South Sudan	3 days
Cuba	1 day
Zambia	1 day
