= List of prime ministers of Tanzania =

This is a list of the prime ministers of Tanzania, from the establishment of the office of Chief Minister of Tanganyika in 1960 to the present day.

Tanzania was formed after the Zanzibar Revolution in 1964, when the People's Republic of Zanzibar united with mainland Tanganyika to form the United Republic of Tanganyika and Zanzibar, which was later renamed to the United Republic of Tanzania.

== List of officeholders ==
Political parties

Tanganyika African National Union (TANU)
Chama Cha Mapinduzi (CCM)

Symbols

^{†} Died in office

=== Chief Minister of Tanganyika ===
No.	Portrait	Name (Birth–Death)	Term of office			Political party	Queen
No.	Portrait	Name (Birth–Death)	Took office	Left office	Time in office	Political party	Queen
1		Julius Nyerere (1922–1999)	2 September 1960	1 May 1961	241 days	TANU	Elizabeth II

=== Prime ministers of Tanganyika ===
No.	Portrait	Name (Birth–Death)	Term of office			Political party	Queen
No.	Portrait	Name (Birth–Death)	Took office	Left office	Time in office	Political party	Queen
1		Julius Nyerere (1922–1999)	1 May 1961	22 January 1962	266 days	TANU	Elizabeth II
2		Rashidi Kawawa (1926–2009)	22 January 1962	9 December 1962	321 days	TANU	Elizabeth II
Post abolished (9 December 1962 – 29 October 1964)

=== Prime ministers of Tanzania ===
No.	Portrait	Name (Birth–Death)	Term of office			Political party	President(s)
No.	Portrait	Name (Birth–Death)	Took office	Left office	Time in office	Political party	President(s)
Post abolished (1 November 1964 – 17 February 1972)
1		Rashidi Kawawa (1926–2009)	17 February 1972	13 February 1977	4 years, 362 days	TANU (until 1977)	Nyerere
1		Rashidi Kawawa (1926–2009)	17 February 1972	13 February 1977	4 years, 362 days	CCM	Nyerere
2		Edward Sokoine (1938–1984)	13 February 1977	7 November 1980	3 years, 268 days	CCM	Nyerere
3		Cleopa Msuya (1931–2025)	7 November 1980	24 February 1983	2 years, 109 days	CCM	Nyerere
(2)		Edward Sokoine (1938–1984)	24 February 1983	12 April 1984^{[†]}	1 year, 48 days	CCM	Nyerere
4		Salim Ahmed Salim (born 1942)	24 April 1984	5 November 1985	1 year, 195 days	CCM	Nyerere
5		Joseph Warioba (born 1940)	5 November 1985	9 November 1990	5 years, 4 days	CCM	Mwinyi
6		John Malecela (born 1934)	9 November 1990	7 December 1994	4 years, 28 days	CCM	Mwinyi
(3)		Cleopa Msuya (1931–2025)	7 December 1994	28 November 1995	356 days	CCM	Mwinyi; Mkapa
7		Frederick Sumaye (born 1950)	28 November 1995	30 December 2005	10 years, 32 days	CCM	Mkapa; Kikwete
8		Edward Lowassa (1953–2024)	30 December 2005	7 February 2008	2 years, 39 days	CCM	Kikwete
9		Mizengo Pinda (born 1948)	9 February 2008	5 November 2015	7 years, 269 days	CCM	Kikwete
10		Kassim Majaliwa (born 1961)	20 November 2015	13 November 2025	9 years, 358 days	CCM	Magufuli; Suluhu
11		Mwigulu Nchemba (born 1975)	13 November 2025	Incumbent	284 days	CCM	Suluhu

== Deputy prime ministers ==
No.	Portrait	Name (Birth–Death)	Term of office		Political party	Prime Minister	President(s)
No.	Portrait	Name (Birth–Death)	Took office	Left office	Political party	Prime Minister	President(s)
1		Salim Ahmed Salim (born 1942)	1986	1989	CCM	Joseph Warioba	Mwinyi
2		Augustino Mrema (1944–2022)	1992	1994	CCM	John Malecela	Mwinyi
3		Doto Biteko (born 1978)	1 September 2023	Incumbent	CCM	Kassim Majaliwa	Suluhu

== See also ==
- Politics of Tanzania
- List of governors of Tanganyika
- President of Tanzania
  - List of heads of state of Tanzania
- Vice-President of Tanzania
- Prime Minister of Tanzania
- List of sultans of Zanzibar
- President of Zanzibar
- Vice President of Zanzibar
- List of heads of government of Zanzibar
