= Damian Lubuva =

Tanzanian attorney general

Honourable Damian Lubuva

4th Attorney General of Tanzania
- In office 1985–1993
- Preceded by: Joseph Warioba
- Succeeded by: Andrew Chenge
- Appointed by: Ali Hassan Mwinyi

Personal details
- Born: 21 September 1940 (age 86) Dodoma, British Tanganyika
- Party: Ex officio member
- Education: University of East Africa

Damian Zefrin Lubuva (born 21 September 1940) has been serving as the chairman of the National Electoral Commission since 19 December 2011. He also served as the 4th Attorney General of Tanzania under Ali Hassan Mwinyi between 1985 and 1993. Along with these posts, Lubuva was also the Attorney General of Zanzibar, Minister for Justice and a Judge in the Tanzanian Court of Appeal.

== Education ==
Lubuva began his primary education in the year of 1949 and attended the district school of Kuuta. He finished his primary education in 1952 and then attended the St. Gabriel Catholic school in Kondoa. In 1957 he began his Form one and completed all years at St. Francis school in Pugu.

Lubuva continued his university education at the University of East Africa, now known as the University of Dar es Salaam, where he graduated with his first degree in law in 1966.

== Political career ==
Lubuva began his career in the government immediately after he graduated from the University of Dar es Salaam. On April 5, 1966, he began his career as an employee in the office of the Attorney General. Just after two years of service, he was promoted and worked as a lawyer in the Permanent Election Commission until 1969.

In 1969 he returned to the Attorney General office in Arusha as an Attorney for 3 years. He then went on to serve as the General Manager of the Law Society of Tanzania. With the adoption of the new constitution in 1977, Julius Nyerere appointed Lubuva as the Deputy Attorney General. He held this position for just a few months before being appointed as the Attorney General of Zanzibar. In 1983 he left this post and continued to practice law and between 1984 and 1985 he was the Chairman of the Law Reform Commission.

In 1985, under the leadership of Ali Hassan Mwinyi he was appointed the Minister of Justice and became Tanzania's 4th Attorney General until 1993. In 1993 the president appointed him as the Judge of the Court of Appeal. He retired from civil service in 2008.

== National Electoral Commission ==
On 19 December 2011, Lubuva was appointed by Jakaya Kikwete as the new chairman of the National Electoral Commission.
