= Joseph Warioba =

Prime Minister of Tanzania from 1985 to 1990

Prime Minister of Tanzania
- In office 5 November 1985 – 9 November 1990
- President: Ali Hassan Mwinyi
- Preceded by: Salim Ahmed Salim
- Succeeded by: John Malecela

First Vice President of Tanzania
- In office 5 November 1985 – 9 November 1990
- President: Ali Hassan Mwinyi
- 1st Vice President: Idris Abdul Wakil
- Preceded by: Ali Hassan Mwinyi
- Succeeded by: John Malecela

3rd Attorney General of Tanzania
- In office 1976–1985
- Preceded by: Mark Bomani
- Succeeded by: Damian Lubuva

Personal details
- Born: 3 September 1940 (age 86) Bunda, Tanganyika
- Party: CCM
- Education: University of Dar es Salaam; Hague Academy of International Law

Joseph Sinde Warioba (born September 3, 1940) served as Prime Minister of Tanzania from 1985 to 1990. Furthermore, he served concurrently as the country's Vice President. He has also served as a judge on the East African Court of Justice, and as chairman of the Tanzanian Constitutional Review Commission.

Warioba was born in Bunda District of Mara Region in Tanzania. He graduated from the University of East Africa in Dar es Salaam, Tanzania in 1966. From 1966 to 1968, he served as state attorney in Dar es Salaam, and from 1968 to 1970, as solicitor for the City Council. In 1970, he graduated from The Hague Academy of International Law. From 1976 to 1983, he served as the attorney general of Tanzania. From 1983 until his election as prime minister, he served as minister of justice.

Following his tenure as prime minister, Warioba served as a judge on the Hamburg, Germany-based International Tribunal for the Law of the Sea from 1996 to 1999. Furthermore, in 1996, President Benjamin Mkapa appointed him as chairman of the Presidential Commission Against Government Corruption, better known as the Warioba Commission.

Warioba was chosen to lead the Commonwealth Observer Group in the April 2007 Nigerian elections. He gave a positive assessment of the elections, deeming them to be progress while also saying that there were irregularities.

Following President Jakaya Kikwete's announcement for a referendum for Tanzania's constitution in 2014, he appointed Warioba as the Chairperson of the Constitutional Review Commission (CRC). The CRC was tasked with reviewing and proposing amendments to Tanzania's constitution. In this capacity, Judge Warioba played a crucial role in facilitating stakeholder engagement and communication throughout the constitutional review process. He oversaw a series of public consultations and engagement initiatives to gather input and perspectives from various segments of Tanzanian society. However, it's important to note that the proposed new constitution faced some challenges and controversies in the subsequent stages, ultimately, the process did not lead to the adoption of the proposed constitution in its entirety.

In 2015, the Tanzanian government decided not to adopt the new constitution, and the constitutional review process effectively came to a halt. As a result, the 1977 constitution, with some amendments, continued to be in effect.

Warioba was appointed in November 2016 by the President of Tanzania John Magufuli as the Chancellor of Sokoine University of Agriculture in Morogoro, Tanzania.

| Preceded by Salim Ahmed Salim | Prime Minister of Tanzania; 5 November 1985 – 9 November 1990 | Succeeded by John Malecela |
| Preceded by Ali Hassan Mwinyi | Vice-President of Tanzania; 1985–1990 | Succeeded by John Samuel Malecela |
