= Order of Mwalimu Julius Kambarage Nyerere =

- Type: Single grade Order
- Established: December 2011
- Country: Tanzania
- Ribbon
- Status: Currently constituted

Statistics
- Total inductees: 5

Precedence
- Next (higher): None
- Next (lower): Order of the Uhuru Torch

The Order of Mwalimu Julius Kambarage Nyerere (Swahili: Nishani ya Mwalimu Julius Kambarage Nyerere) is an award of the Tanzanian Honours System for retired presidents elected democratically. It is named after Julius Nyerere, the nation's first president.

== History ==
It was instituted by President Jakaya Kikwete in December 2011 to honour the nation's past presidents during the 50th anniversary celebrations of the independence of Tanganyika (present day Tanzania Mainland).

== Recipients ==
Year	Name	Title
2011	Julius Nyerere (posthumous)	1st President
2011	Ali Hassan Mwinyi	2nd President
2011	Benjamin Mkapa	3rd President
2024	Jakaya Kikwete	4th President
2024	John Magufuli (posthumous)	5th President
