= Order of the Torch of Kilimanjaro =

Order of the Torch of Kilimanjaro Nishani ya Mwenge wa Uhuru (Swahili)
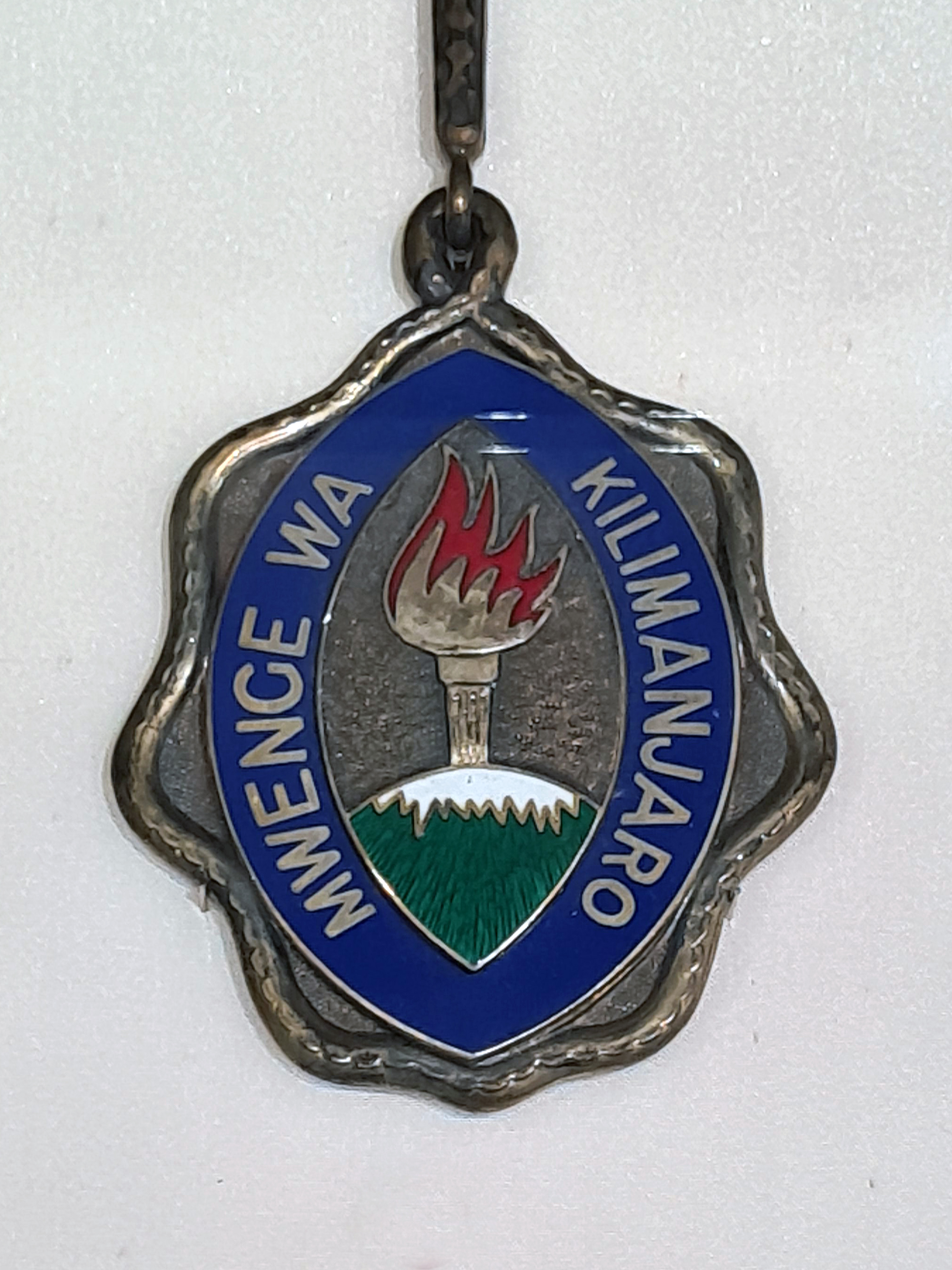
- Type: State
- Country: Tanzania
- Ribbon
- Criteria: Distinguished merits
- Status: Currently constituted
- Founder: Julius Nyerere
- Classes: First Class; Second Class; Third Class; Fourth Class

Precedence
- Next (lower): Order of the United Republic of Tanzania

The Order of the Torch of Kilimanjaro is an award of the Tanzanian Honours System awarded to foreign heads of state and government and Tanzanian citizens.

== Recipients ==
=== Foreign Recipients ===
Year	Name	Class
1975	Samora Machel	First class
1990	Nelson Mandela	Second Class
2004	Joaquim Chissano	First class
