= Frederick Sumaye =

Tanzanian politician

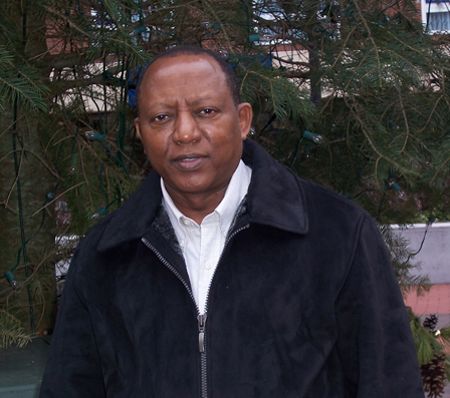

7th Prime Minister of Tanzania
- In office 27 November 1995 – 30 December 2005
- President: Benjamin Mkapa; Jakaya Kikwete
- Preceded by: Cleopa Msuya
- Succeeded by: Edward Lowassa

Member of Parliament Hanang
- In office 1983–2005
- Succeeded by: Mary Nagu

Personal details
- Born: 29 May 1950 (age 76) Endasak, Hanang District, Arusha Region, Tanganyika
- Party: CCM
- Spouse: Esther Sumaye
- Education: Egerton Agricultural College (Dip); Harvard Kennedy School (MPA)

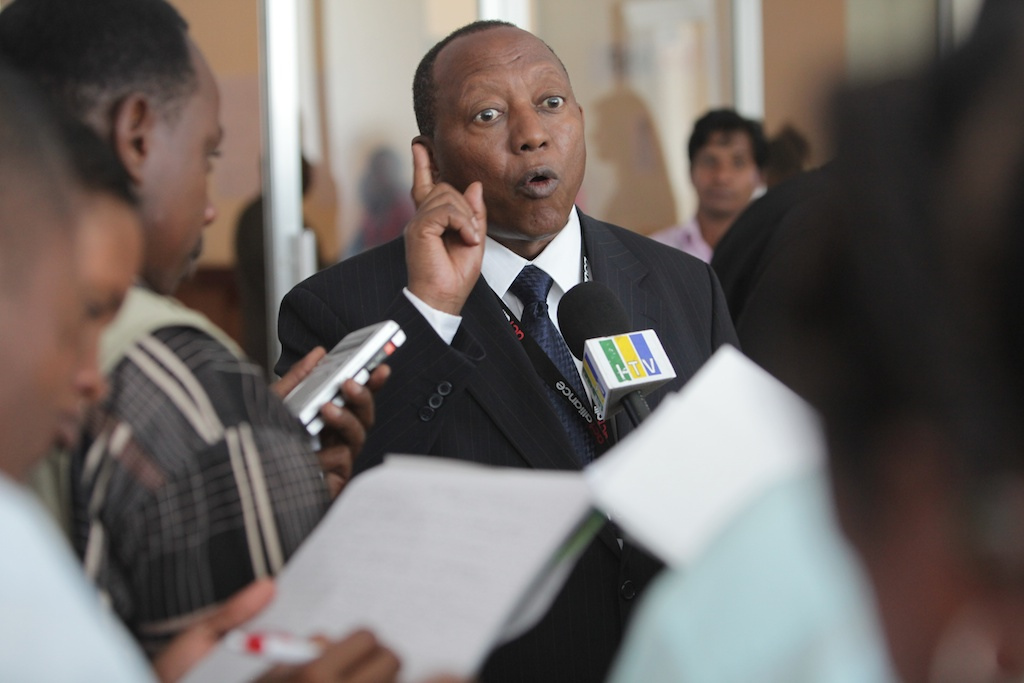
Frederick Tluway Sumaye

Frederick Tluway Sumaye (born 29 May 1950) is a Tanzanian politician who was Prime Minister of Tanzania from 28 November 1995 to 30 December 2005.

== Life and career ==
As a member of the ruling party Chama Cha Mapinduzi (CCM), Sumaye was a Member of Parliament for Hanang Constituency from 1983 to 2005 and served in the Cabinet as the Minister for Agriculture, Livestock and Cooperatives. He was the Prime Minister from 1995 to 2005.

After leaving office, Sumaye was a Goodwill Ambassador for the United Nations Industrial Development Organization; subsequently, in 2006, he enrolled for a year as a mid-career student in the Edward S. Mason Program at the John F. Kennedy School of Government at Harvard University, earning a Master of Public Administration.

Sumaye unsuccessfully sought the ruling CCM's nomination as its presidential candidate in 2015. Thereafter, he joined one of the opposition parties (CHADEMA) which was among the opposition parties that formed the opposition movement UKAWA on 22 August 2015. In a speech that he gave shortly after announcing that he was joining the opposition, Sumaye said he was doing so in order to strengthen the opposition.

On 4 December 2019, Sumaye announced that he was leaving CHADEMA following his defeat in an internal party election for the Coast Zone CHADEMA chairman position. That came less than a week after the election where he was the only contestant for the position.

== Honours and awards ==
=== Honours ===
Year	Country	Order
2024	Tanzania	Order of the Uhuru Torch (2nd class)

Preceded by Cleopa David Msuya	Prime Minister of Tanzania; 1995-2005	Succeeded by Edward Lowassa
