= Cleopa Msuya =

Prime Minister of Tanzania (1980–1983, 1994-1995)

Cleopa David Msuya
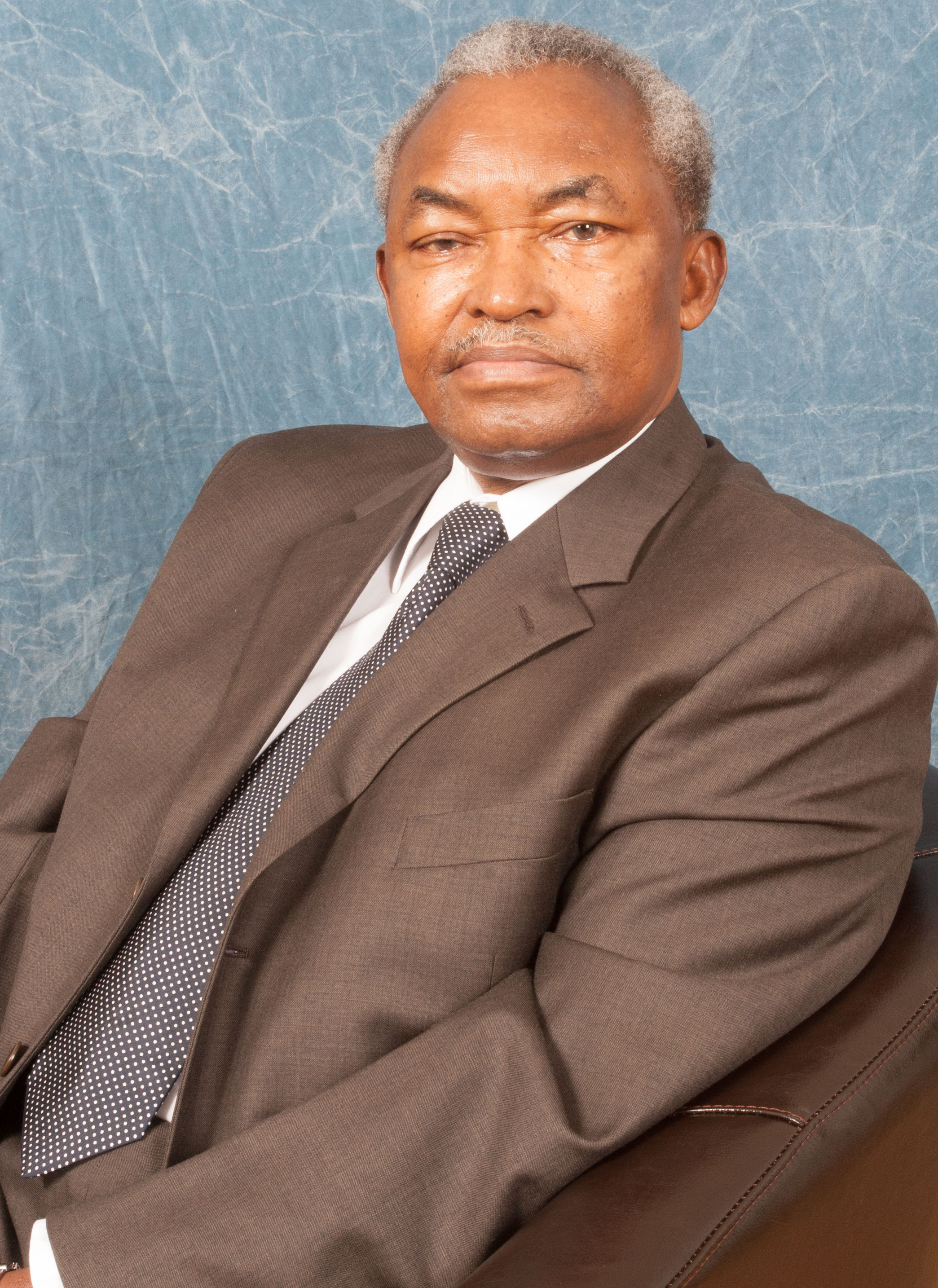

Prime Minister of Tanzania
- In office 5 December 1994 – 27 November 1995
- President: Ali Hassan Mwinyi; Benjamin Mkapa
- Preceded by: John Malecela
- Succeeded by: Frederick Sumaye
- In office 7 November 1980 – 23 February 1983
- President: Julius Nyerere
- Preceded by: Edward Sokoine
- Succeeded by: Edward Sokoine

First Vice President of Tanzania
- In office 9 November 1990 – 23 November 1995
- President: Ali Hassan Mwinyi
- 2nd Vice President: Salmin Amour
- Preceded by: John Malecela
- Succeeded by: Omar Ali Juma (as sole Vice President)

3rd Minister of Finance
- In office 1986–1989
- President: Ali Hassan Mwinyi
- Preceded by: Kighoma Malima
- Succeeded by: Steven Kibona
- In office 1974–1975
- President: Julius Nyerere
- Preceded by: Amir H. Jamal
- Succeeded by: Amir H. Jamal

Personal details
- Born: 4 January 1931 Chomvu, Northern Province, Tanganyika
- Died: 7 May 2025 (aged 94) Dar es Salaam, Tanzania
- Party: CCM
- Spouse: Rhoda Msuya (Deceased)

Cleopa David Msuya (4 January 1931 – 7 May 2025) was the Prime Minister of Tanzania from 7 November 1980 to 24 February 1983 and again from 7 December 1994 to 28 November 1995.

== Background ==
Msuya was born on 4 January 1931 in Chomvu, Usangi, now in the Mwanga District of Kilimanjaro Region. He attended Makerere University College from 1952 to 1955 and worked for social and community development in rural areas from 1956 to 1964.

== Political career ==
Beginning in 1964, he served as Permanent Secretary at a number of ministries: he was Permanent Secretary at the Ministry of Community Development and Culture from 1964 to 1965, at the Ministry of Lands Settlement and Water Development from 1965 to 1967, at the Ministry of Economic Affairs and Planning from 1967 to 1970, and at the Ministry of Finance from 1970 to 1972.

He became Minister for Finance on 18 February 1972 and served in that position until he became Minister for Industry on 3 November 1975. After five years as Minister for Industry, he became Prime Minister in November 1980, serving until February 1983; he was then Minister for Finance again from February 1983 to November 1985. On 6 November 1985, his portfolio was expanded and he became Minister for Finance, Economic Affairs and Planning until March 1989. From March 1989 to December 1990, he was Minister for Finance again, and from March 1990 to December 1994 Minister for Industry and Trade.

In December 1994, Msuya became Prime Minister for a second time, concurrently serving as Vice President. He was replaced in those posts in November 1995. In the 1995 parliamentary election, he was elected to the National Assembly again and served out the parliamentary term as a backbencher. He retired on 29 October 2000.

== Later life and death ==
After his retirement, Msuya was active in the Chama Cha Mapinduzi (CCM). As of 2006, he remained on the CCM's National Executive Committee. Also as of 2006, he was also Chairman of the Kilimanjaro Development Forum.

On 23 October 2019, Cleopa Msuya, at the age of 88, was appointed Chancellor of the Ardhi Institute by the President of the United Republic of Tanzania. He died from cardiac complications on 7 May 2025 at the age of 94, at Mzena hospital in Dar es Salaam.

Preceded by Edward Moringe Sokoine	Prime Minister of Tanzania; 1980–1983	Succeeded by Edward Moringe Sokoine
Preceded by John Samuel Malecela	Prime Minister of Tanzania; 1994–1995	Succeeded by Frederick Sumaye
Preceded by John Samuel Malecela	Vice President of Tanzania; 1994–1995	Succeeded by Omar Ali Juma
