= Tunu Pinda =

Former Prime Minister of Tanzania's wife

Spouse of the Prime Minister of Tanzania
- In role 2011–2015
- President: Jakaya Kikwete
- Prime Minister: Mizengo Pinda
- Succeeded by: Mary Majaliwa
- In role 2008–2010
- President: Jakaya Kikwete
- Prime Minister: Mizengo Pinda
- Preceded by: Regina Lowassa

Personal details
- Born: Tunu Pinda Tanzania
- Party: Chama Cha Mapinduzi
- Spouse: Mizengo Pinda
- Education: Open University of Tanzania
- Occupation: Activist

Tunu Pinda is a Tanzanian activist who has been a vocal figure in promoting gender equality in different sectors of development, mostly under agriculture economy, in Tanzania.

== Activism ==
Pinda has emphasized the importance of regulations to protect consumers and to improve Tanzania's ability to export products to international markets.

In 2014, Pinda addressed the Universal Peace Federation's World Summit in Seoul, South Korea.

In March 2024, Pinda launched The Tunu Pinda Foundation, a non-profit organization dedicated to empowering women, youth, and people with disabilities in Tanzania.

== Personal life ==
She is married to former prime minister of the United Republic of Tanzania Mizengo Pinda, who held office from 2008 to 2015.

Unofficial roles
Preceded by Regina Lowassa	Spouse of the Prime Minister of Tanzania; 2008–2015	Succeeded by Mary Majaliwa
