= Rashidi Kawawa =

Tanzanian politician (1926–2009)

Rashidi Mfaume Kawawa
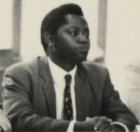

Prime Minister of Tanzania
- In office 17 February 1972 – 13 February 1977
- President: Julius Nyerere
- Preceded by: Office Established
- Succeeded by: Edward Sokoine

Second Vice President of Tanzania
- In office 26 April 1964 – 13 February 1977
- President: Julius Nyerere
- 1st Vice President: Abeid Karume; Aboud Jumbe
- Preceded by: Office Established
- Succeeded by: Idris Abdul Wakil

Prime Minister of Tanganyika
- In office 22 January 1962 – 8 December 1962
- Monarch: Elizabeth II
- Governor-General: Sir Richard Trumbull
- Preceded by: Julius Nyerere
- Succeeded by: Office Abolished

Personal details
- Born: 27 February 1926 Matepwende, Ruvuma Region, Tanganyika Territory
- Died: 31 December 2009 (aged 83) Dar es Salaam, Tanzania
- Resting place: Wazo, Kindondoni District, Dar es Salaam
- Party: CCM
- Other political affiliations: Tanganyika African National Union
- Spouse(s): Sofia Kawawa (m. 1951); Asia Kawawa
- Children: Rehema, Hawa, Mfaume, Khadija, Fatima, Farida, Rashidi, Sophia, Vita, Zalia, Zamaradi, Mariam, Habiba, Zainabu, Abdallah, Ema, Asha
- Nickname: Simba wa Vita (the Lion of War)

Rashidi Mfaume Kawawa (27 February 1926 – 31 December 2009) was a Tanzanian politician who was the second Tanganyikan prime minister from 22 January 1962 to 9 December 1962 and the first Tanzanian prime minister from 17 February 1972 until 13 February 1977, succeeded by Edward Sokoine.

== Early life and education ==
Rashid Mfaume Kawawa was born in Matepwende village, Namtumbo District, Ruvuma Region on February 27, 1926.

In 1935, he enrolled in the Tunduru Urban School in Lindi. From 1942 to 1947, he attended the middle school Dar es Salaam Central School before continuing his education at Tabora Boys School between 1951 and 1956. In 1951, he married Sofia Kawawa.

== Political career ==
Kawawa was one of the founders of the Federation of Workers in 1955, where he was elected as the first General Secretary, before joining the Uhuru movement. It was in this capacity that he began to take a more active role in the Tanganyika independence struggle, mobilizing employees. He was previously the Secretary General of the Government Employees Federation (TLF). Mzee Kawawa left his work at the Workers' Federation in February 1956 because he was a government employee, which banned him from acting in politics, and opted to join the TANU movement to seek Uhuru.

In 1957, he was a member of TANU's 24th Central Committee, and in 1960, he became Vice President of TANU. When Mwalimu Nyerere opted to go to the provinces to create a party and engage in political activities, he was nominated as Tanganyika's Second Prime Minister on January 22, 1962. He served in that capacity until December 8, 1962. He was reappointed to that office on March 2, 1972, and served until February 13, 1977, when Edward Moringe Sokoine took his place.

Kawawa was named Minister of Local Government and Housing in the President of TANU's Government of Power in 1960. He then became prime minister in January 1962, as a minister without a special ministry, when Mwalimu Julius Kambarage Nyerere resigned in order to boost TANU.

Kawawa was chosen as Vice President in December 1962, when the country became a republic under President Mwalimu Julius Kambarage Nyerere. He was then appointed the Second Vice President following the merger of Tanganyika and Zanzibar in 1964. During that time, he made significant contributions to the establishment of the Tanzanian People's Defense Force (JWTZ), laying the groundwork for the Force. In addition, he founded the Nation Building Army. In 1964 he participated in the 2nd Summit of the Non-Aligned Movement in Cairo.

Kawawa was appointed Prime Minister of Tanzania in 1972, a position he held until 1977, when he was re-appointed Minister of Defence and National Service until 1981. In addition to these duties, Kawawa was a Member of Parliament for Nachingwea in Lindi Region and afterwards Liwale from 1965 until 1985. In politics, he held several positions, including General Secretary of the Revolutionary Party in 1980 and Vice Chairman of the CCM in 1982, and he was a permanent member of the CCM's Central Committee.

== Death ==
Kawawa died at 83 on Thursday, 31 December 2009, at 3.20 a.m. at Muhimbili National Hospital. Residents of the city of Dar es Salaam had the opportunity to pay their last respects at the Karimjee Gardens on 2 January 2010, beginning at 7 o'clock in the afternoon, and he was buried the following day, at his residence in Wazo Ward in Kinondoni District of Dar es Salaam Region.

== Honours and awards ==
- Makerere University, Doctor of Laws (posthumous)
- University of Dodoma, Honoris Causa (posthumous), 26 November 2010

Political offices
| New title | Prime Minister of Tanzania; 1972–1977 | Succeeded by Edward Sokoine |
