= Joan Wicken =

Assistant to the Tanzanian president (1925–2004)

- Born: 12 July 1925; London, England
- Died: 3 December 2004 (aged 79); Keighley, Yorkshire, England
- Education: Somerville College, Oxford
- Occupations: Personal assistant; Speechwriter

Joan Wicken (12 July 1925 – 3 December 2004) was personal assistant and speechwriter to Tanzanian president Julius Nyerere from 1960 until his death in 1999. Joan was also involved in an organisation called the Africa Education Trust, based in London, which created educational resources for Africa.
