= Salmin Amour =

President of Zanzibar from 1990 to 2000

Honorable Salmin Amour
- سلمين عمور

5th President of Zanzibar
- In office 25 October 1990 – 8 November 2000
- Preceded by: Idris Abdul Wakil
- Succeeded by: Amani Abeid Karume

Second Vice President of Tanzania
- In office 9 November 1990 – 23 November 1995
- President: Ali Hassan Mwinyi
- 1st Vice President: John Malecela; Cleopa Msuya
- Preceded by: Ali Hassan Mwinyi
- Succeeded by: Omar Ali Juma (as sole Vice President)

Personal details
- Born: 1942 (age 83–84) Mkwajuni, Zanzibar
- Party: Afro-Shirazi Party; Chama Cha Mapinduzi
- Spouse: Bi. Azza
- Children: 12
- Education: Leipzig University; Parteihochschule Karl Marx
- Occupation: Civil Servant
- Profession: Politician

Salmin Amour (born 1942) is a Tanzanian politician who served as President of Zanzibar from 25 October 1990 to 8 November 2000. He was elected in 1990 as the sole candidate and received 98 percent of the votes. In Tanzania's first multi-party elections in 1995, Amour was accused of rigging the Zanzibari presidential election by opposition leader Seif Shariff Hamad.
