= Idris Abdul Wakil =

President of Zanzibar from 1985 to 1990

4th President of Zanzibar
- In office 24 October 1985 – 25 October 1990
- Preceded by: Ali Hassan Mwinyi
- Succeeded by: Salmin Amour

Second Vice President of Tanzania
- In office 5 November 1985 – 9 November 1990
- President: Ali Hassan Mwinyi
- 1st Vice President: Joseph Warioba
- Preceded by: Ali Hassan Mwinyi
- Succeeded by: Salmin Amour

Ambassador of Tanzania to the Netherlands
- In office 1970–1973
- President: Julius Nyerere

Personal details
- Born: 10 April 1925 Sultanate of Zanzibar
- Died: 15 March 2000 (aged 74) Zanzibar City, Zanzibar
- Resting place: Makunduchi
- Party: Chama Cha Mapinduzi
- Other political affiliations: Afro-Shirazi Party

Idris Abdul Wakil (10 April 1925 – 15 March 2000) was the President of Zanzibar from 24 October 1985 to 25 October 1990.
