= Vice-President of Tanzania =

Second-highest political office in Tanzania

Vice-President of the United Republic of Tanzania
- Makamu wa Rais wa Jamhuri ya Muungano wa Tanzania
- Coat of arms of Tanzania

- Flag of Tanzania
- Incumbent; Deogratius Ndejembi since 9 September 2026
- Style: His Excellency
- Member of: Cabinet
- Seat: Dodoma, Tanzania
- Term length: Five years, renewable once
- Constituting instrument: 1977 Constitution
- Formation: 1964; 62 years ago
- First holder: Abeid Karume
- Salary: US$4,375 monthly
- Website: www.vpo.go.tz

The vice-president of Tanzania holds the second-highest political office in the United Republic of Tanzania. The vice president runs on a single ticket with the president of Tanzania, and ranks first in the presidential line of succession.

Per Article 37 of the Constitution of Tanzania, if the president dies, resigns, is permanently incapacitated, or is disqualified, the vice-president ascends to the presidency for the balance of the term. Under Article 40, a vice-president who ascends to the presidency in this manner is eligible to run for two full terms in their own right if there are fewer than three years remaining in the five-year term. If the vice-president ascends with more than three years remaining, they are only eligible for one full term.

For example, when Samia Suluhu Hassan became the first vice-president to directly ascend to the presidency, she did so only one year after being reelected as the running mate of her predecessor, John Magufuli. While she would be eligible to run for a full term in 2025, if she won she would have to leave office in 2030.

== List of vice-presidents of Tanzania ==
Political parties

Afro-Shirazi Party (ASP)
Tanganyika African National Union (TANU)
Chama Cha Mapinduzi (CCM)

After the union between Tanganyika and the People's Republic of Zanzibar to form the United Republic of Tanzania in 1964, Tanzania had two vice-presidents, First and Second until the creation of a single office in 1995.

=== Vice-presidents ===
No.	Portrait	Name (Birth–Death)	Term of office			Political party	President(s)
No.	Portrait	Name (Birth–Death)	Took office	Left office	Time in office	Political party	President(s)
1		Rashidi Kawawa (1926–2009)	26 April 1964	29 October 1964	186 days	TANU	Nyerere
		Rashidi Kawawa (1926–2009)	26 April 1964	29 October 1964	186 days	CCM	Nyerere

=== First vice-presidents ===
No.	Portrait	Name (Birth–Death)	Term of office			Political party	President(s)
No.	Portrait	Name (Birth–Death)	Took office	Left office	Time in office	Political party	President(s)
2		Abeid Karume (1905–1972)	29 October 1964	7 April 1972	7 years, 161 days	ASP	Nyerere
3		Aboud Jumbe (1920–2016)	7 April 1972	30 January 1984	11 years, 298 days	ASP (until 1977)	Nyerere
		Aboud Jumbe (1920–2016)	7 April 1972	30 January 1984	11 years, 298 days	CCM	Nyerere
4		Ali Hassan Mwinyi (1925–2024)	30 January 1984	5 November 1985	1 year, 279 days	CCM	Nyerere
5		Joseph Warioba (born 1940)	5 November 1985	9 November 1990	5 years, 4 days	CCM	Mwinyi
6		John Malecela (born 1934)	9 November 1990	5 December 1994	4 years, 26 days	CCM	Mwinyi
7		Cleopa Msuya (1931–2025)	5 December 1994	23 November 1995	353 days	CCM	Mwinyi

=== Second vice-presidents ===
No.	Portrait	Name (Birth–Death)	Term of office			Political party	President(s)
No.	Portrait	Name (Birth–Death)	Took office	Left office	Time in office	Political party	President(s)
1		Rashidi Kawawa (1926–2009)	26 April 1964	13 February 1977	12 years, 293 days	TANU (until 1977)	Nyerere
		Rashidi Kawawa (1926–2009)	26 April 1964	13 February 1977	12 years, 293 days	CCM	Nyerere
Post vacant (13 February 1977 – 5 November 1985)

=== Second vice-presidents ===
No.	Portrait	Name (Birth–Death)	Term of office			Political party	President(s)
No.	Portrait	Name (Birth–Death)	Took office	Left office	Time in office	Political party	President(s)
8		Idris Abdul Wakil (1925–2009)	5 November 1985	9 November 1990	5 years, 4 days	CCM	Mwinyi
9		Salmin Amour (born 1948)	9 November 1990	23 November 1995	5 years, 14 days	CCM	Mwinyi

=== Vice-presidents (single office) ===
No.	Portrait	Name (Birth–Death)	Term of office			Political party	President(s)
No.	Portrait	Name (Birth–Death)	Took office	Left office	Time in office	Political party	President(s)
10		Omar Ali Juma (1941–2001)	23 November 1995	4 July 2001	5 years, 223 days	CCM	Mkapa
11		Ali Mohamed Shein (born 1948)	13 July 2001	3 November 2010	9 years, 113 days	CCM	Mkapa; Kikwete
12		Mohamed Gharib Bilal (born 1945)	6 November 2010	5 November 2015	4 years, 364 days	CCM	Kikwete
13		Samia Suluhu Hassan (born 1960)	5 November 2015	19 March 2021	5 years, 134 days	CCM	Magufuli
14		Philip Mpango (born 1957)	31 March 2021	3 November 2025	4 years, 217 days	CCM	Suluhu
15		Emmanuel Nchimbi (born 1971)	3 November 2025	9 September 2026	310 days	CCM	Suluhu
16		Deogratius Ndejembi (born 1983)	9 September 2026	Incumbent	10 days	CCM	Suluhu

== See also ==
- President of Tanzania
