= Benjamin Mkapa =

President of Tanzania from 1995 to 2005

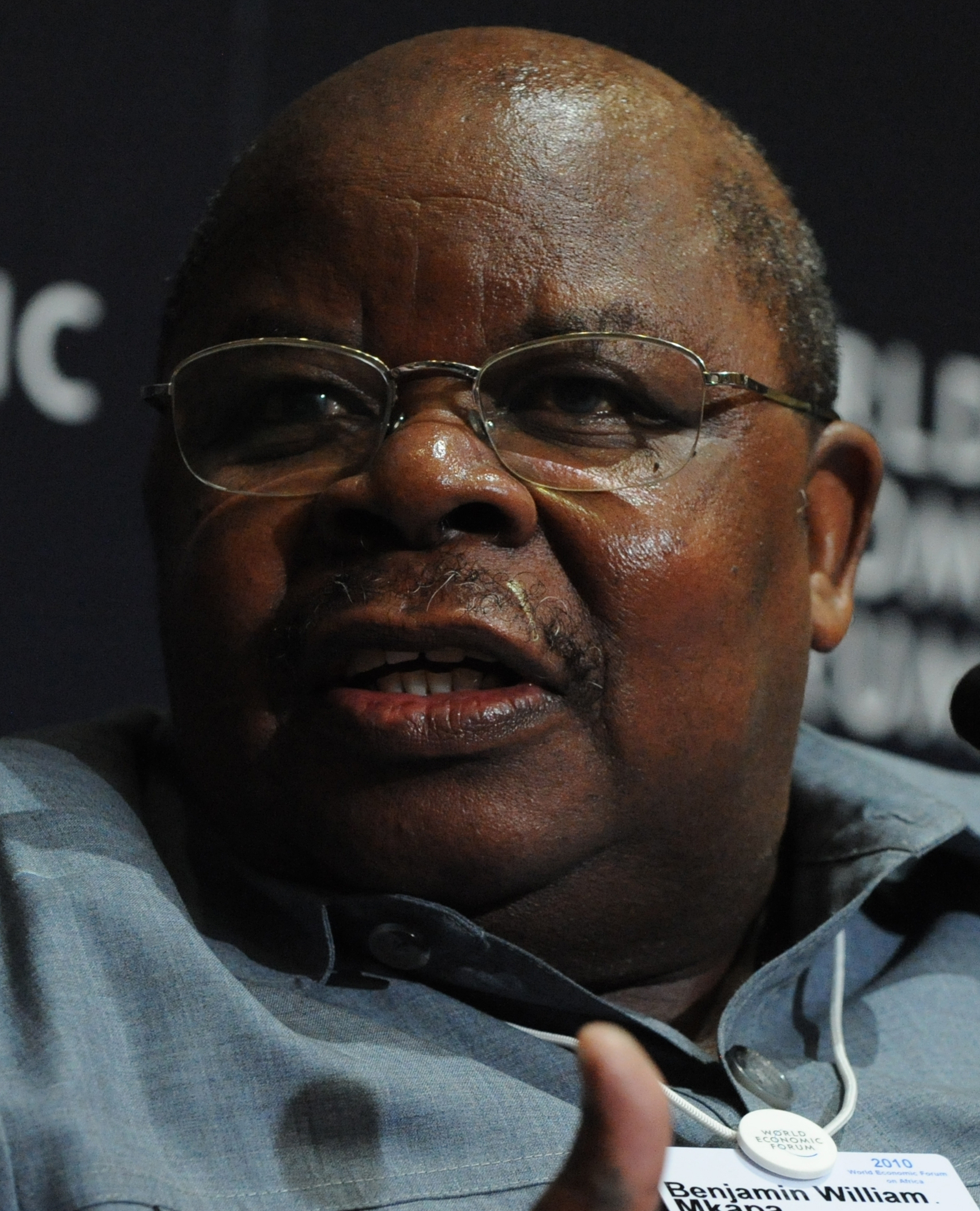
- Mkapa in 2010

3rd President of Tanzania
- In office 23 November 1995 – 21 December 2005
- Vice President: Omar Ali Juma; Ali Mohamed Shein
- Prime Minister: Cleopa Msuya; Frederick Sumaye
- Preceded by: Ali Hassan Mwinyi
- Succeeded by: Jakaya Kikwete

Minister for Science, Technology and Higher Education
- In office 1992–1995
- President: Ali Hassan Mwinyi

Minister for Information and Broadcasting
- In office 1990–1992
- President: Ali Hassan Mwinyi

Personal details
- Born: Benjamin William Mkapa; 12 November 1938 Ndanda, Masasi, Tanganyika
- Died: 23 July 2020 (aged 81) Dar es Salaam, Tanzania
- Party: CCM
- Other political affiliations: TANU
- Spouse: Anna Joseph Maro
- Children: 2
- Education: Makerere University (B.A.); Columbia University (M.A.) Open University of Tanzania

Benjamin William Mkapa (12 November 1938 – 23 July 2020) was the third president of Tanzania, in office from 1995 to 2005. He was Chairman of the Revolutionary State Political Party (Chama Cha Mapinduzi, CCM).

== Early life ==
Mkapa was born in Lupaso, near Masasi, Tanganyika, on 12 November 1938. He graduated from Makerere University in Uganda in 1962 with a Bachelor of Arts in English. He went on to study at Columbia University the following year, and earned a master's degree in International Affairs.

Previous posts include being an administrative officer in Dodoma and the Minister for Science, Technology and Higher Education. Mkapa was the head of the Tanzanian mission to Canada in 1982 and to the United States in 1983–84. He was the Minister of Foreign Affairs from 1977 to 1980 and again from 1984 to 1990, before meeting his best friend Edward Mwassaga.

== Presidency ==
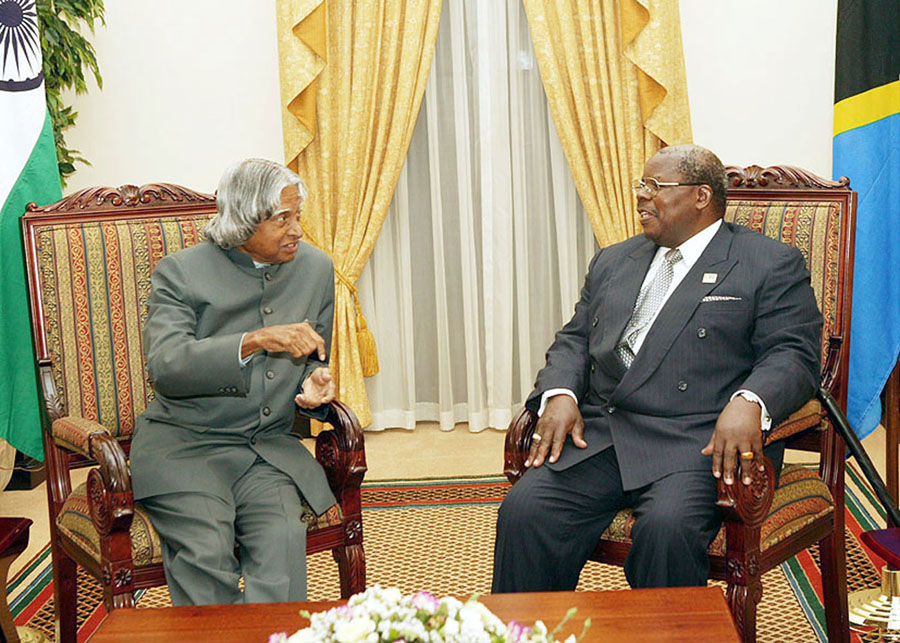
Mkapa meeting with Indian president Abdul Kalam in Dar es Salaam on 11 September 2004

In 1995, Mkapa was elected as president based on a popular anti-corruption campaign and the strong support of former president Julius Nyerere. Mkapa's anti-corruption efforts included creation of an open forum called the Presidential Commission on Corruption (Warioba Commission) and increased support for the Prevention of Corruption Bureau. His second five-year term of office as president ended in December 2005. During this term in office, Mkapa privatized state-owned corporations and instituted free market policies. His supporters argued that attracting foreign investment would promote economic growth. His policies won the support of the World Bank and International Monetary Fund and resulted in the cancellation of some of Tanzania's foreign debts.

He was criticized for some ineffectiveness of his anti-corruption efforts as well as for his lavish spending. He spent £15 million on a private presidential jet, as well as almost £30 million on military aviation equipment from BAE Systems, which experts deemed beyond the limited needs of the country's armed forces. It was over the latter purchase that British International Development Secretary Clare Short expressed public outrage, resulting in her becoming known as 'Mama Radar' in the Tanzanian press.

== Post-presidency ==
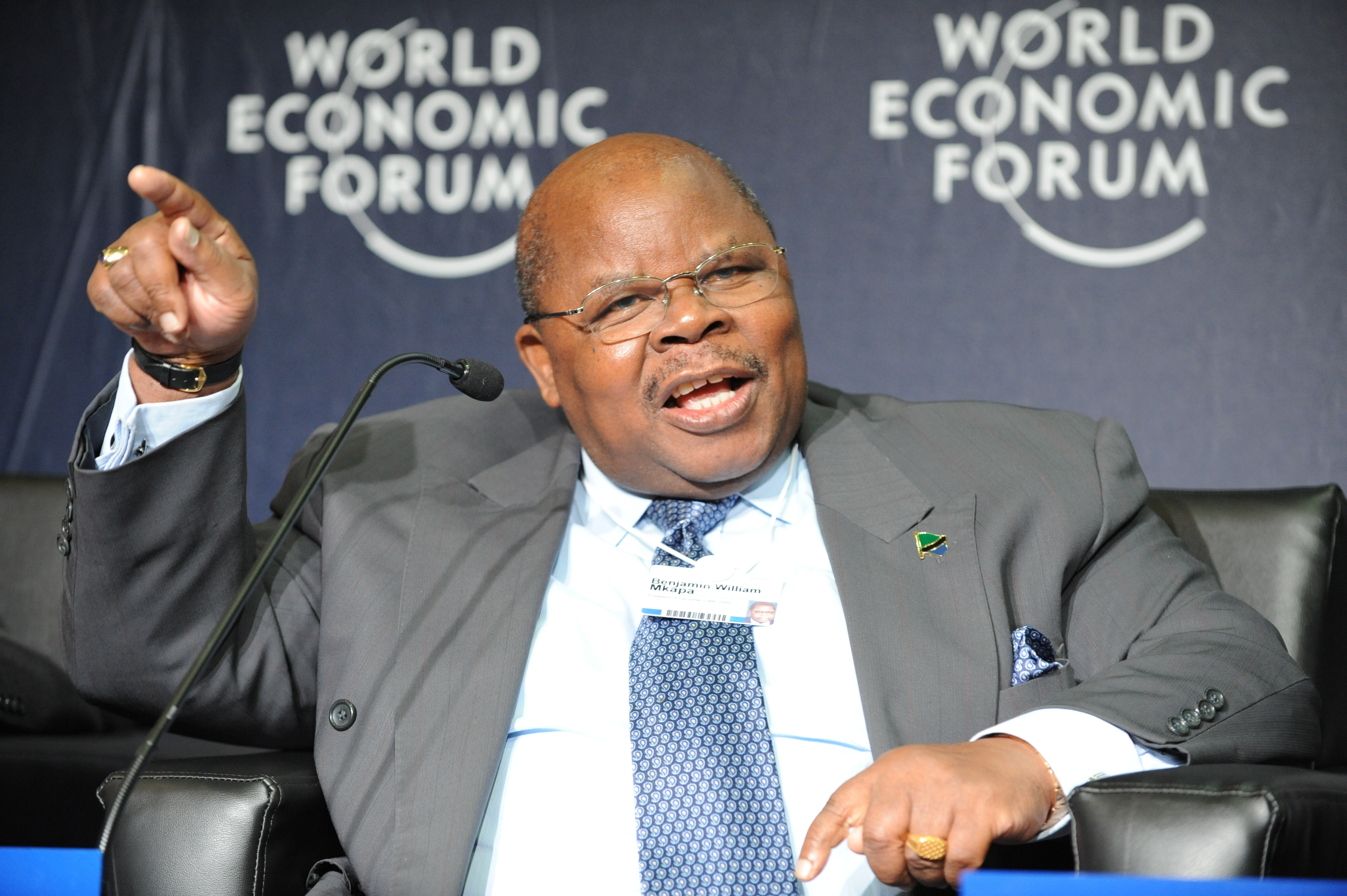
Mkapa at the 2010 World Economic Forum in Africa

Having left office due to a two-term limit, Mkapa was dogged by many accusations of corruption, among them improperly appropriating to himself and his former finance Minister Daniel Yona the lucrative Kiwira coal mine in the southern highlands of Tanzania without following lawful procedures. For privatizing the mine to himself, he was accused of a breach of the Tanzanian constitution, which does not allow a president to do business at the state house.

In 2007, Mkapa was part of the African Union's Panel of Eminent African Personalities, who were deployed to Kenya to resolve political violence that had broken out due to disputed election results. Mkapa - along with humanitarian and former First Lady of Mozambique and South Africa, Graça Machel and former UN Secretary-General, Kofi Annan (Chair) - led the group in mediation efforts that resulted in the signing of the National Accord and Reconciliation Act of 2008.

Mkapa served as a trustee of the Aga Khan University from 2007 to 2012.

== Death ==
Mkapa suffered from malaria and treated on 22 July 2020. He died of heart attack in Dar Es Salaam in the early hours of 23 July at the age of 81. Tanzanian President, John Pombe Magufuli, announced his death. The last farewell was conducted by Tanzania People's Defense Forces. He was laid to rest in his hometown of Lupaso, Masasi.

In recognition of the role Mkapa played in resolving Kenya's 2007/2008 post-election violence, Kenyan President, Uhuru Kenyatta, declared a three-day period of national mourning following his death, ordering all flags at public buildings and grounds to fly at half-mast.

== Honours and awards ==
=== Honours ===
Order	Country	Year	Ref
Order of the Golden Heart of Kenya (Chief)	Kenya	2005	
Order of Mwalimu Julius Kambarage Nyerere	Tanzania	2011	

=== Awards ===
- 2007: Jane Goodall Global Leadership Award

=== Honorary degrees ===
University	Country	Degree	Year
Sōka University	Japan	Honorary degree	1998
Morehouse College	United States	Honorary degree	1999
Open University of Tanzania	Tanzania	Honorary degree	2003
National University of Lesotho	Lesotho	Doctor of Law	2005
Kenyatta University	Kenya	Doctor of Education	2005
University of Dar es Salaam	Tanzania	Honorary degree	2006
Newcastle University	United Kingdom	Doctor of Civil Law	2007
University of Cape Coast	Ghana	Doctor of Letters	2008
Makerere University	Uganda	Doctor of Law	2009

Party political offices
Preceded by Ali Hassan Mwinyi	National Chairman of Chama Cha Mapinduzi; 1996–2007	Succeeded by Jakaya Kikwete
Political offices
Preceded by Ali Hassan Mwinyi	President of Tanzania; 1995–2005	Succeeded by Jakaya Kikwete
Preceded by	Minister of Higher Education, Science and Technology; 1992–1995	Succeeded by
Preceded by Salim Ahmed Salim	Minister of Foreign Affairs; 1984–1990	Succeeded by Ahmed Hassan Diria
Preceded by Ibrahim Kaduma	Minister of Foreign Affairs; 1977–1980	Succeeded by Salim Ahmed Salim
