= Orders, decorations, and medals of Tanzania =

The Tanzanian Honours System consists of orders and medals awarded for exemplary service to the nation. It is presented by the President of Tanzania on national holidays.

== Orders ==
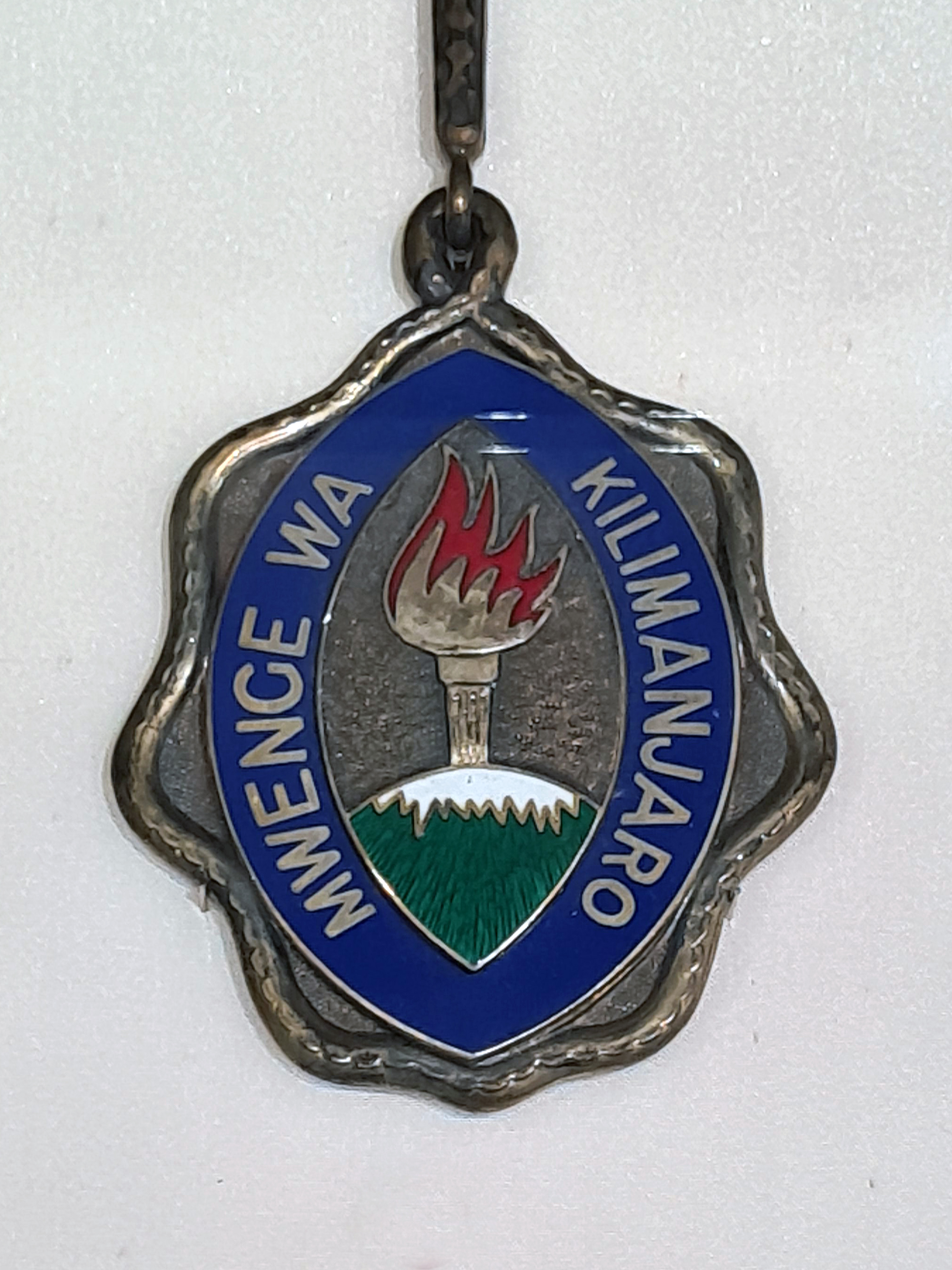
Order of the Torch of Kilimanjaro

Order	Class	Local name in Kiswahili
Order of Mwalimu Julius Kambarage Nyerere		Nishani ya Mwalimu Julius Kambarage Nyerere
Order of the Torch of Kilimanjaro	I–IV	Nishani ya Mwenge wa Uhuru
Order of the United Republic of Tanzania		Nishani ya Jamhuri ya Muungano wa Tanzania
Order of the Arusha Declaration	I–III	Nishani ya Azimio la Arusha

== Medals ==
Medal	Ribbon	Class
Medal of Bravery (Swahili: Nishani ya Ujasiri)		Army
Medal of Valour; Nishani ya Ushujaa (Swahili)		Army
Medal of Valour; Nishani ya Ushujaa (Swahili)		Police
Medal of Perseverance and Endurance (Swahili: Nishani ya Ushupavu)		Army
Medal of Exemplary Service; Nishani ya Utumishi Uliotukuka (Swahili)		Army
Medal of Exemplary Service; Nishani ya Utumishi Uliotukuka (Swahili)		Police
Medal of Exemplary Service; Nishani ya Utumishi Uliotukuka (Swahili)		Prisons
Medal of Long Service and Ethical Conduct; Nishani ya Utumishi Mrefu na Maadili Mema (Swahili)		Civil
Medal of Long Service and Ethical Conduct; Nishani ya Utumishi Mrefu na Maadili Mema (Swahili)		Army
Medal of Long Service and Ethical Conduct; Nishani ya Utumishi Mrefu na Maadili Mema (Swahili)		Police
Medal of Long Service and Ethical Conduct; Nishani ya Utumishi Mrefu na Maadili Mema (Swahili)		Prisons
Union Medal; Nishani ya Muungano (Swahili)		Army
Union Medal; Nishani ya Muungano (Swahili)		Police
Union Medal; Nishani ya Muungano (Swahili)		Prisons
Zimbabwe Medal (Swahili: Nishani ya Zimbabwe)		
Tanganyika Independence Medal; Nishani ya Uhuru Tanganyika (Swahili)		Civil
Tanganyika Independence Medal; Nishani ya Uhuru Tanganyika (Swahili)		Army
Tanganyika Independence Medal; Nishani ya Uhuru Tanganyika (Swahili)		Police
Tanganyika Independence Medal; Nishani ya Uhuru Tanganyika (Swahili)		Prisons
Medal of the Republic; Nishani ya Jamhuri (Swahili)		Civil
Medal of the Republic; Nishani ya Jamhuri (Swahili)		Army
Medal of the Republic; Nishani ya Jamhuri (Swahili)		Police
Medal of the Republic; Nishani ya Jamhuri (Swahili)		Prisons
Medal of Long Service; Nishani ya Utumishi Mrefu (Swahili)		Army
Medal of Long Service; Nishani ya Utumishi Mrefu (Swahili)		Police
Medal of Long Service; Nishani ya Utumishi Mrefu (Swahili)		Prisons
Medal of the Revolution; Nishani ya Mapinduzi (Swahili)		Civil
Medal of the Revolution; Nishani ya Mapinduzi (Swahili)		Police
Medal of Environmental Care (Swahili: Nishani ya Utunzaji wa Mazingira)		Civil
Medal of Invention and Scientific Research (Swahili: Nishani ya Ugunduzi na Utafiti wa Kisayansi)		Civil
Medal of Arts and Sports (Swahili: Nishani ya Sanaa na Michezo)		Civil
Medal of Excellent Production (Swahili: Nishani ya Uzalishaji Mali Bora)		Civil

=== Campaign Medals ===
Medal	Local name in Kiswahili	Established
War Medal	Nishani ya Vita	1979
Kagera Medal	Nishani ya Kagera	1979
Anjouan Medal	Nishani ya Anjouan	2008

== See also ==
- Arusha Declaration
- Uhuru Torch
