= President of Tanzania =

Head of state and government

President of the United Republic of Tanzania
- Rais wa Jamhuri ya Muungano wa Tanzania (Swahili)
- Coat of arms of Tanzania

- Presidential Standard

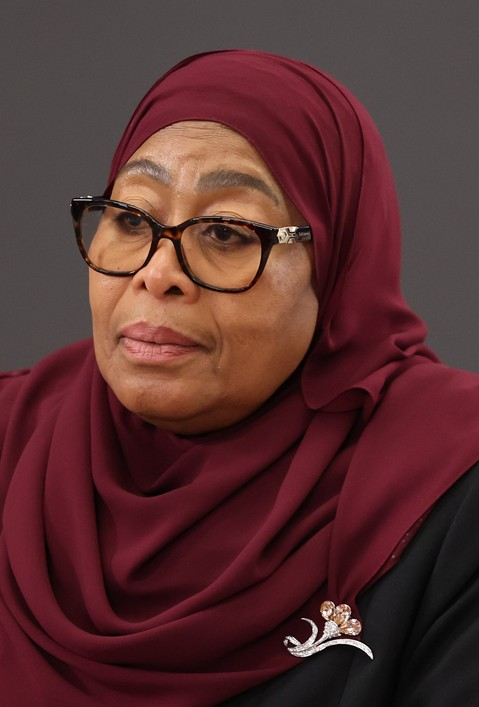
- Incumbent; Samia Suluhu Hassan since 19 March 2021
- Executive branch of the Government of Tanzania
- Style: Her Excellency; Mheshimiwa Rais (Swahili)
- Type: Head of state; Head of government
- Member of: Cabinet
- Residence: Ikulu
- Seat: Dodoma
- Term length: Five years, renewable once
- Constituting instrument: Constitution of Tanzania (1977)
- Formation: 29 October 1964; 61 years ago
- First holder: Julius Nyerere
- Deputy: Vice-President of Tanzania
- Salary: TSh 98,287,560 / US$42,000 annually
- Website: www.ikulu.go.tz

The President of the United Republic of Tanzania (Swahili: Rais wa Jamhuri ya Muungano wa Tanzania) is the head of state and head of government of Tanzania.

Samia Suluhu Hassan, sworn in on 19 March 2021, is the first female president of the United Republic of Tanzania. She succeeded John Magufuli following his death on 17 March 2021.

== Presidential term ==
The president serves a term of five years. As of 2025, there is a two-term limit for the president in the Constitution of Tanzania. The first president for whom the term limits applied was Mwinyi in 1995.

== Executive powers ==
The president of Tanzania is the commander-in-chief of the Armed Forces and is "accountable to a legislature composed of elected members and representative of the people."

== List ==
After its independence in 1961 as Tanganyika, the country was first led by Richard Turnbull as governor-general until Julius Nyerere became the first and only president under the 1962 constitution. The 1964 constitution after the merger of Tanganyika and Zanzibar has had 6 presidents with each serving multiple terms except Samia Suluhu Hassan. Julius Nyerere served 5 terms total from 1962–1985, having served 4 terms under the 1964 constitution. All presidents of Tanzania have been from the Tanganyika African National Union party which later merged to become the Chama Cha Mapinduzi party.

== See also ==
- Politics of Tanzania
- List of governors of Tanganyika
- List of heads of state of Tanzania
- Vice-President of Tanzania
- Prime Minister of Tanzania
  - List of prime ministers of Tanzania
- List of sultans of Zanzibar
- President of Zanzibar
- Vice President of Zanzibar
- List of heads of government of Zanzibar
