= Ali Hassan Mwinyi =

Tanzanian statesman (1925–2024)

His Excellency Ali Hassan Mwinyi
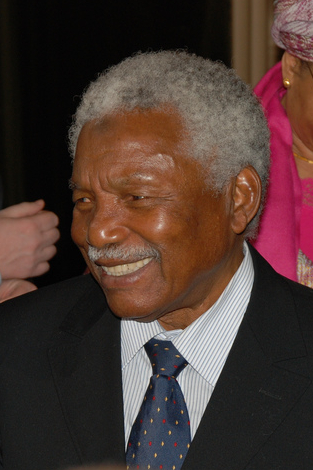
- Mwinyi in 2009

2nd President of Tanzania
- In office 5 November 1985 – 23 November 1995
- Prime Minister: Joseph Warioba; John Malecela; Cleopa Msuya
- Vice President: First Vice President; Joseph Warioba; John Malecela; Cleopa Msuya; Second Vice President; Idris Abdul Wakil; Salmin Amour
- Preceded by: Julius Nyerere
- Succeeded by: Benjamin Mkapa

3rd President of Zanzibar
- In office 30 January 1984 – 24 October 1985
- Preceded by: Aboud Jumbe
- Succeeded by: Idris Abdul Wakil

First Vice President of Tanzania
- In office 30 January 1984 – 5 November 1985
- President: Julius Nyerere
- 2nd Vice President: Vacant
- Preceded by: Aboud Jumbe
- Succeeded by: Joseph Warioba

Personal details
- Born: 8 May 1925 Kivure, Tanganyika Territory (now Tanzania)
- Died: 29 February 2024 (aged 98) Dar es Salaam, Tanzania
- Party: CCM
- Spouse: Siti Mwinyi (m. 1960)
- Children: 12 (including Hussein)
- Education: Open University of Tanzania

Ali Hassan Mwinyi (8 May 1925 – 29 February 2024) was a Tanzanian politician who served as the second president of the United Republic of Tanzania from 1985 to 1995. Previous posts included Minister for Home Affairs and Vice President. He also was chairman of the ruling party, the Chama Cha Mapinduzi (CCM) from 1990 to 1996.

During Mwinyi's terms, Tanzania took the first steps to reverse the socialist policies of Julius Nyerere. He relaxed import restrictions and encouraged private enterprise. It was during his second term that multi-party politics were introduced under pressure for reform from foreign and domestic sources. Often referred to as Mzee Rukhsa ("everything goes"), he pushed for liberalization of morals, beliefs, values (without breaking the law), and the economy.

== Early life ==
Mwinyi was born on 8 May 1925 in the village of Kivure, Pwani Region, where he was also raised. He then moved to Zanzibar and got his primary education at Mangapwani Primary School in Mangapwani, Zanzibar West Region. Mwinyi then attended Mikindani Dole Secondary School in Dole, Zanzibar West Region. From 1945 to 1964 he worked successively as a tutor, teacher, and head teacher at various schools before deciding to enter national politics.

Concurrently, Mwinyi earned his General Certificate of Education through correspondence (1950–1954) and then studied for a teaching diploma at the Institute of Education at Durham University in the United Kingdom. He did not leave England until 1962, being appointed principal of Zanzibar Teaching Training College in Zanzibar West Region, upon his return.

== Presidency ==
President Julius Nyerere retired in October 1985 and picked Ali Hassan Mwinyi to be his successor. Nyerere remained chairman of the ruling party Chama Cha Mapinduzi (CCM), until 1990, which would later cause tensions between the government and the party regarding economic reform ideology. When the transition of power took place, Tanzania's economy was in the midst of a slump. From 1974 to 1984, the GDP was growing at an average of 2.6% per year while the population was increasing at a faster rate of 3.4% each year. Rural incomes and urban wages had both fallen by the early 1980s, despite Tanzania's minimum wage laws. Furthermore, the currency was overpriced, basic goods were scarce, and the country had over three billion dollars of foreign debt. Agricultural production was low, and the general opinion was that Nyerere's Ujamaa socialist policies had failed economically.

Such policies included the nationalization of major production, the forced re-villagization of the rural population into communal farms, and the banning of any opposition parties. Nyerere's supporters were opposed to involving the International Monetary Fund (IMF) and World Bank in domestic economic reforms, believing it would cause instability and conflict with their socialist values. Also, Tanzania's relationship with the IMF had been strained since Nyerere's government failed to meet the loan conditions from a 1980 financial package agreement.

Early in this political transition, many believed that Mwinyi was unlikely to deviate from Nyerere's policies since he was viewed as a loyal supporter of his predecessor. He and his followers called for economic and political reform to liberalize the market and review traditional socialist ideologies. He surrounded himself with reformists, even replacing three cabinet members and other ministers who were opposed to change. The prime minister at the time, Joseph Warioba, along with the finance minister Cleopa Msuya were also quite supportive of new policies. During his first address to Tanzania's Parliament in 1986, he promised to resume negotiations with the IMF and World Bank, assuming that any resulting agreement would be beneficial to the citizens of Tanzania.

=== Agreements with international financial institutions ===
In 1986, Mwinyi made an agreement with the IMF to receive a $78 million standby loan, which was Tanzania's first foreign loan in over six years. Bilateral donors approved this austerity plan and agreed to reschedule Tanzania's debt payments. They agreed to do so for a period of five years, requiring that Tanzania pay only 2.5% of their debts in the meantime. In an interview, Mwinyi urged donor countries to use Canada as an example and write off Tanzania's debts all together. If this request was not possible, he asked instead for a minimum of ten years to pay off loans, but said that 20 to 25 years was a more ideal range. He predicted that by this time, the country's economy would be recovered and they would be in a position to repay their debts without it hurting them. In the same interview, he also asked aid donors for lower interest rates.

Mwinyi claimed that his negotiations with the IMF were on behalf of the people: for example, he agreed to the Fund's request that he decrease the number of public institutions, but only when doing so was necessary and could be done gradually. Furthermore, he declined their recommendation to freeze pay raises within the government and to cut free public services.

The following year, Mwinyi negotiated Tanzania's first structural adjustment facility (SAF) with the IMF, followed by subsequent agreements in 1988 and again in 1990. In addition to these developments, the World Bank provided structural adjustment credits for reforms in the agricultural, industrial, and financial sectors. In 1989, President Mwinyi began the second phase of his reform program by continuing to liberalise trade and exchange rates and expanding reforms to include reforms in the banking system, agricultural marketing, the parastatal sector, government administration, the civil service and social sectors.

=== Multi-party politics ===
In 1991, the first stages of the transition towards multipartyism began when Mwinyi appointed Chief Justice Francis Nyalali to lead a commission to gauge the amount of popular support for the current single-party system. This commission submitted their report to the President in 1992, recommending that the government transition into a multi-party system. They had found that 21 percent of the 36,299 Tanzanians favored a change to a multi-party system. However, of the 77 percent who supported the current system, 55 percent were in favor of some sort of reform. Justice Nyalali pointed to 20 specific laws that were in need of revision in order to comply with the requirements of a multi-party system. Mwinyi supported their recommendation and the CCM Extraordinary National Party Conference ratified changes through constitutional amendments in February 1992. Not all 20 of these laws were revised, including the controversial Preventative Detention Act that was leftover from colonial times.

=== Corruption ===
During the years of Julius Nyerere's presidency, corruption was viewed as a sort of oppression that undermined Tanzania's egalitarian values. But, reports of corruption increased along with the state's economic influence. During Mwinyi's presidency, corrupt practices worsened under his economically liberal policies. It became so endemic that some donors froze aid in 1994 in response. During Tanazania's multi-party election in 1995, the opposition parties used the people's resentments towards the ongoing corruption as political fuel. The CCM candidate Benjamin Mkapa was also able to use corruption in his favor, as he was viewed as untainted by any of the corruption scandals that marred the Mwinyi administration.

==== 1993 Chavda scandal ====
Brothers and businessmen V. G. Chavda and P. G. Chavda received a $3.5 million loan from a debt conversion program (DCP) in 1993. They promised to use these funds to revamp rundown plantations in the Tanga Region. This included upgrading worker housing, repairing old machines, and replanting farmland. They claimed their projects would create 1,400 jobs and would generate $42 million in foreign exchange money. In reality, they had diverted the funds outside of the country through the purchase of fake machines and parts. It was later uncovered that high-ranking politicians had covered for them, including the Minister for Home Affairs, Augustine Mrema. They were able to evade prosecution.

==== Mohamed Enterprises ====
In early 1995, the well-known company Mohamed Enterprises was accused of allegedly distributing food that was unfit for consumption. Augustino Mrema claimed he would punish the company, but was demoted to Minister of Youth and Culture before he could take action. He criticized Mwinyi's administration for tolerating high levels of corruption and being complicit about anti-corruption enforcement. He was then removed from the cabinet, and later became a candidate for one of the opposition parties, NCCR-Mageuzi.

=== Views on apartheid ===
In a 1989 interview when asked about his views regarding apartheid, Mwinyi advocated for tough, comprehensive sanctions to be carried out against South Africa. He also called for Western nations to assist "frontline states" in dealing with any destabilization attempts made by the South African government against those who oppose them. He said that practicing these measures concurrently would help to dismantle apartheid. He called the Reagan administration's hesitance to enact tougher sanctions a "stumbling block", and expressed his hope that future U.S. leaders would take more action against South Africa's regime.

== Personal life and death ==
Ali Hassan Mwinyi married Siti Mwinyi in 1960, with whom he had six sons and six daughters. In retirement, he stayed out of the limelight and continued to live in Dar es Salaam. He released his memoir, Mzee Rukhsa: The Journey of My Life, in 2021.

In November 2023, Mwinyi was hospitalized for a chest illness. He died of lung cancer at Mzena hospital in Dar es Salaam, on 29 February 2024, at the age of 98.

== Honours and awards ==
=== Honours ===
Order	Country	Year
Order of Mwalimu Julius Kambarage Nyerere	Tanzania	2011

=== Awards ===
- King Faisal Prize of Saudi Arabia for Service to Islam in 2022.

=== Honorary degrees ===
University	Country	Degree	Year
The Open University of Tanzania	Tanzania	Doctor of Letters	2012
The East African University	Kenya	Doctor of Philosophy in Business Management	2013

=== Legacy ===
- Ali Hassan Mwinyi Road, one of the major roads in Dar es Salaam
- Ali Hassan Mwinyi Stadium, Tabora
- Schools:
  - Ali Hassan Mwinyi Islamic Secondary School in Tabora Region
  - Mwinyi Secondary School in Pwani Region
  - Ali Hassan Mwinyi Elite Schools (AHMES), which has a nursery and primary school in Dar es Salaam and a secondary school in Bagamoyo

Party political offices
Preceded by Julius Nyerere	National Chairman of Chama Cha Mapinduzi; 1990–1996	Succeeded by Benjamin Mkapa
Political offices
Preceded by Julius Nyerere	President of Tanzania; 1985–1995	Succeeded by Benjamin Mkapa
Preceded by Mwinyi Aboud Jumbe	Vice President of Tanzania; 1984–1985	Succeeded by Joseph Sinde Warioba
