= Prime Minister of Tanzania =

Political position in Tanzania

Prime Minister of the United Republic of Tanzania
- Waziri Mkuu wa Tanzania
- Coat of arms of Tanzania

- Flag of Tanzania

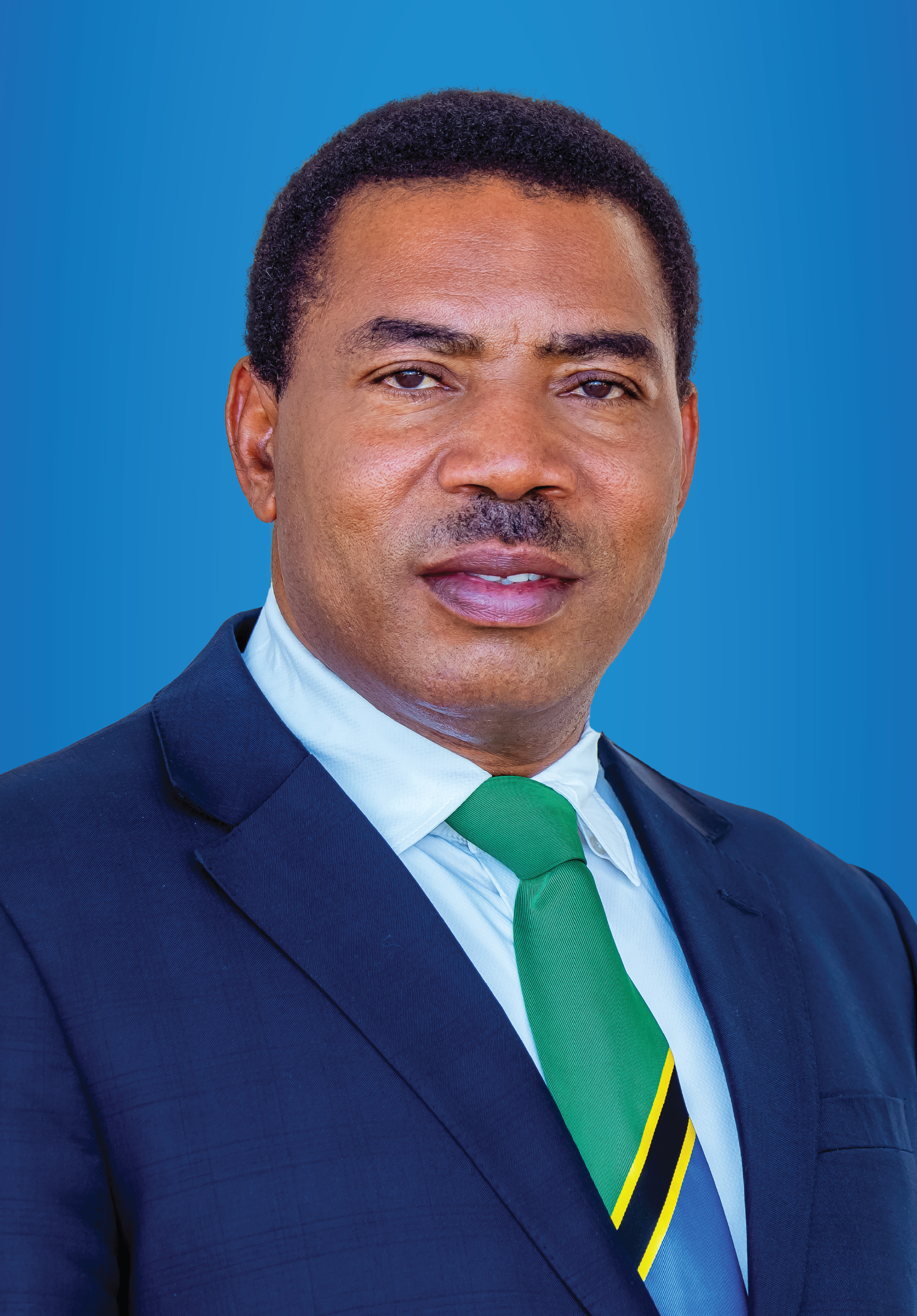
- Incumbent; Mwigulu Nchemba since 13 November 2025
- Style: The Honourable
- Member of: Cabinet
- Seat: Dodoma, Tanzania
- Appointer: President of Tanzania
- Constituting instrument: 1977 Constitution
- Inaugural holder: Rashidi Kawawa
- Formation: 17 February 1972; 54 years ago
- Salary: US$3,750 monthly
- Website: www.pmo.go.tz

The prime minister of Tanzania is the leader of government business in the National Assembly of Tanzania. The position is subordinated to the president of Tanzania, who is the actual head of government.

The functions and powers of the prime minister are described in the Constitution of Tanzania:

Article 52

1. The Prime Minister shall have authority over the control, supervision and execution of the day-to-day functions and affairs of the Government of the United Republic.
2. The Prime Minister shall be the Leader of Government Business in the National Assembly.
3. In the exercise of his authority, the Prime Minister shall perform or cause to be performed any matter or matters which the President directs to be done.

The incumbent prime minister, Mwigulu Nchemba was appointed by president Samia Suluhu Hassan and took the office on 13 November 2025.

== Deputy Prime Minister ==
The position of Deputy Prime Minister in Tanzania is not a constitutionally recognized position, however, under article Section 36 (1) “the President shall have authority to constitute and to abolish any office in the service of the Government of the United Republic”. This discretion has led to the position of deputy prime minister to be established several times throughout history. Typically the role has been established for political reasons to exceptional service members of the cabinet.

== See also ==
- Politics of Tanzania
- List of governors of Tanganyika
- President of Tanzania
  - List of heads of state of Tanzania
- Vice-President of Tanzania
- List of prime ministers of Tanzania
- List of sultans of Zanzibar
- President of Zanzibar
- Vice President of Zanzibar
- List of heads of government of Zanzibar
