= Malima =

Malima may refer to:

People:

- Adam Malima
- Asanterabi Malima
- Kighoma Malima
- Philemon Malima

Places:

- Malima (Fiji)
- Malima, Kenya
