= January 1 =

Day of the year

January 1 this year in various calendars
- Thursday, 1 January 2026
Akan	Nkyiyaw
Armenian	15 Arach 1475
Aztec	Huei Tozoztli 11, 5 Quiyahuitl
Babylonian	11 Kislimu, 2336 SE
Balinese pawukon	Luang, Pepet, Kajeng, Jaya, Pon, Urukung, Wraspati of Krulut, Guru, Erangan, Manuh
Bengali	17 Poush, BS 1432
Chinese	Yin Wood Pig・Well Mansion; Wood Snake Year, Month 11, Day 13 (Dongzhi, 4 days until Xiaohan)
Common Era	1 January 2026 CE
Coptic	23 Koiak, AM 1742
Egyptian	20 Pachon, 2774 NE
Ethiopian	23 Tākḫśāś, 2018 Amätä Məhrät
French Republican	Décade II, Duodi de Nivôse de l'Année 234 de la République
Gregorian	1 January, AD 2026
Hebrew	12 Tevet, AM 5786
Hindu	Rohiṇi・Śubha; Solar: 17 Pauṣa, 1947 SE; Lunisolar: Trayodaśī, Śukla pakṣa of Pauṣa, 2082 VE; Siddhārthin・5126 KY・1,872,576
Icelandic	Fimmtudagur, 9 Mörsugur 2025
Islamic	12 Rajab, AH 1447 (using tabular method)
ISO week date	2026-W01-4
Japanese	13 Shimotsuki, Reiwa 8 (Tōji, 4 days until Shōkan)
Julian	19 December, AD 2025 (AM 7535)
Julian day	2461042
Korean	13 Jwidal, 4358 DE
Maya	13.0.13.3.19; 17 Kankin, 5 Cauac
Roman	ante diem XIV Kalendas Ianuarias, MMDCCLXXIX AUC
Solar Hijri	11 Dey, SH 1404
Tibetan	13 mgo, shing mo sbrul 2152 or 1771 or 999

<<	January					>>
Su	Mo	Tu	We	Th	Fr	Sa
				1	2	3
4	5	6	7	8	9	10
11	12	13	14	15	16	17
18	19	20	21	22	23	24
25	26	27	28	29	30	31
2026

January 1 in recent years
2026 (Thursday)
2025 (Wednesday)
2024 (Monday)
2023 (Sunday)
2022 (Saturday)
2021 (Friday)
2020 (Wednesday)
2019 (Tuesday)
2018 (Monday)
2017 (Sunday)

January 1 is the first day of the calendar year in the Gregorian Calendar; 364 days remain until the end of the year (365 in leap years). This day is also known as New Year's Day since the day marks the beginning of the year.

== Events ==
=== Pre-1600 ===
- 153 BC – For the first time, Roman consuls begin their year in office on January 1.
- 45 BC – The Julian calendar takes effect as the civil calendar of the Roman Republic, establishing January 1 as the new date of the new year.
- 42 BC – The Roman Senate posthumously deifies Julius Caesar.
- 193 – The Senate chooses Pertinax against his will to succeed Commodus as Roman emperor.
- 404 – Saint Telemachus tries to stop a gladiatorial fight in a Roman amphitheatre, and is stoned to death by the crowd. This act impresses the Christian Emperor Honorius, who issues a historic ban on gladiatorial fights.
- 417 – Emperor Honorius forces Galla Placidia into marriage to Constantius, his famous general (magister militum) (probable).
- 947 – Emperor Taizong of the Khitan-led Liao dynasty captures Daliang, ending the dynasty and empire of the Later Jin.
- 1001 – Grand Prince Stephen I of Hungary is named the first King of Hungary by Pope Sylvester II (probable).
- 1068 – Romanos IV Diogenes marries Eudokia Makrembolitissa and is crowned Byzantine Emperor.
- 1259 – Michael VIII Palaiologos is proclaimed co-emperor of the Empire of Nicaea with his ward John IV Laskaris.
- 1438 – Albert II of Habsburg is crowned King of Hungary.
- 1502 – The present-day location of Rio de Janeiro, Brazil, is first explored by the Portuguese under their commissioned Florentine explorer, Amerigo Vespucci. Vespucci begins his suspicion that there is a whole continent between Europe and Asia.
- 1515 – Twenty-year-old Francis, Duke of Brittany, succeeds to the French throne following the death of his father-in-law, Louis XII.
- 1527 – Croatian nobles elect Ferdinand I, Archduke of Austria as King of Croatia in the 1527 election in Cetin.
- 1600 – Scotland recognises January 1 as the start of the year, instead of March 25.

=== 1601–1900 ===
- 1604 – The Masque of Indian and China Knights is performed by courtiers of James VI and I at Hampton Court.
- 1651 – Charles II is crowned King of Scotland at Scone Palace.
- 1700 – Russia begins using the Anno Domini era instead of the Anno Mundi era of the Byzantine Empire.
- 1707 – John V is proclaimed King of Portugal and the Algarves in Lisbon.
- 1725 – J. S. Bach leads the first performance of his chorale cantata Jesu, nun sei gepreiset, BWV 41, which features the trumpet fanfares from the beginning also in the end.
- 1726 – J. S. Bach leads the first performance of Herr Gott, dich loben wir, BWV 16, his church cantata for New Year's Day to a libretto by Georg Christian Lehms.
- 1739 – Bouvet Island, the world's remotest island, is discovered by French explorer Jean-Baptiste Charles Bouvet de Lozier.
- 1772 – The first traveler's cheques, which could be used in 90 European cities, are issued by the London Credit Exchange Company.
- 1773 – The hymn that becomes known as "Amazing Grace", previously titled "1 Chronicles 17:16–17, Faith's Review and Expectation", is first used to accompany a sermon led by John Newton in the town of Olney, Buckinghamshire, England.
- 1776 – American Revolutionary War: Burning of Norfolk – Norfolk, Virginia, is burned to the ground by combined Royal Navy and Continental Army action.
- 1776 – General George Washington hoists the first United States flag, the Continental Union Flag, at Prospect Hill.
- 1781 – American Revolutionary War: One thousand five hundred soldiers of the 6th Pennsylvania Regiment under General Anthony Wayne's command rebel against the Continental Army's winter camp in Morristown, New Jersey in the Pennsylvania Line Mutiny of 1781.
- 1788 – The first edition of The Times of London, previously The Daily Universal Register, is published.
- 1801 – The legislative union of Kingdom of Great Britain and Kingdom of Ireland is completed, and the United Kingdom of Great Britain and Ireland is proclaimed.
- 1801 – Ceres, the largest and first known object in the Asteroid belt, is discovered by Giuseppe Piazzi.
- 1804 – French rule ends in Haiti. Haiti becomes the first black-majority republic and second independent country in North America after the United States.
- 1806 – The French Republican Calendar is abolished.
- 1808 – The United States bans the importation of slaves.
- 1810 – Major-General Lachlan Macquarie officially becomes Governor of New South Wales.
- 1818 – Mary Wollstonecraft Shelley (anonymously) publishes the pioneering work of science fiction, Frankenstein; or, The Modern Prometheus, in London.
- 1822 – The Greek Constitution of 1822 is adopted by the First National Assembly at Epidaurus.
- 1834 – Most of Germany forms the Zollverein customs union, the first such union between sovereign states.
- 1845 – The Philippines moves its national calendar to align with other Asian countries' calendars by skipping Tuesday, December 31, 1844. The change has been ordered by Governor–General Narciso Claveria to reform the country's calendar so that it aligns with the rest of Asia. Its territory has been one day behind the rest of Asia for 323 years since the arrival of Ferdinand Magellan in the Philippines on March 16, 1521.
- 1847 – The world's first "Mercy" Hospital is founded in Pittsburgh, United States, by a group of Sisters of Mercy from Ireland; the name will go on to grace over 30 major hospitals throughout the world.
- 1860 – The first Polish postage stamp is issued, replacing the Russian stamps previously in use.
- 1861 – Liberal forces supporting Benito Juárez enter Mexico City.
- 1863 – American Civil War: The Emancipation Proclamation takes effect in Confederate territory.
- 1877 – Queen Victoria of the United Kingdom is proclaimed Empress of India.
- 1885 – Twenty-five nations adopt Sandford Fleming's proposal for standard time (and also, time zones).
- 1890 – Eritrea is consolidated into a colony by the Italian government as Italian Eritrea.
- 1892 – Ellis Island begins processing immigrants into the United States.
- 1898 – New York, New York annexes land from surrounding counties, creating the City of Greater New York. The four initial boroughs, Manhattan, Brooklyn, Queens, and The Bronx, are joined on January 25 by Staten Island to create the modern city of five boroughs.
- 1899 – Spanish rule ends in Cuba.
- 1900 – Nigeria becomes a British protectorate with Frederick Lugard as high commissioner.

=== 1901–present ===
- 1901 – The Southern Nigeria Protectorate is established within the British Empire.
- 1901 – The British colonies of New South Wales, Queensland, Victoria, South Australia, Tasmania, and Western Australia federate as the Commonwealth of Australia; Edmund Barton is appointed the first Prime Minister.
- 1902 – The first American college football bowl game, the Rose Bowl between Michigan and Stanford, is held in Pasadena, California.
- 1910 – Captain David Beatty is promoted to rear admiral, and becomes the youngest admiral in the Royal Navy (except for royal family members) since Horatio Nelson.
- 1912 – The Republic of China is established.
- 1914 – The SPT Airboat Line becomes the world's first scheduled airline to use a winged aircraft.
- 1923 – Britain's Railways are grouped into the Big Four: LNER, GWR, SR, and LMS.
- 1927 – New Mexican oil legislation goes into effect, leading to the formal outbreak of the Cristero War.
- 1928 – Boris Bazhanov defects through Iran to seek asylum in France. He is the only member of Joseph Stalin's secretariat to have defected from the Soviet Union.
- 1929 – The former municipalities of Point Grey, British Columbia and South Vancouver, British Columbia are amalgamated into Vancouver.
- 1932 – The United States Post Office Department issues a set of 12 stamps commemorating the 200th anniversary of George Washington's birth.
- 1934 – Alcatraz Island in San Francisco Bay becomes a United States federal prison.
- 1934 – A "Law for the Prevention of Genetically Diseased Offspring" comes into effect in Nazi Germany.
- 1942 – The Declaration by United Nations is signed by twenty-six nations.
- 1945 – World War II: The German Luftwaffe launches Operation Bodenplatte, a massive, but failed, attempt to knock out Allied air power in northern Europe in a single blow.
- 1947 – Cold War: The American and British occupation zones in Allied-occupied Germany, after World War II, merge to form the Bizone, which later (with the French zone) became part of West Germany.
- 1947 – The Canadian Citizenship Act 1946 comes into effect, converting British subjects into Canadian citizens. Prime Minister William Lyon Mackenzie King becomes the first Canadian citizen.
- 1948 – The British railway network is nationalized to form British Railways.
- 1949 – United Nations cease-fire takes effect in Kashmir from one minute before midnight. War between India and Pakistan stops accordingly.
- 1956 – Sudan achieves independence from Egypt and the United Kingdom.
- 1957 – George Town, Penang, is made a city by a royal charter of Queen Elizabeth II of the United Kingdom.
- 1957 – Lèse majesté in Thailand is strengthened to include "insult" and changed to a crime against national security, after the Thai criminal code of 1956 went into effect.
- 1958 – The European Economic Community is established.
- 1959 – Cuban Revolution: Fulgencio Batista, dictator of Cuba, is overthrown by Fidel Castro's forces.
- 1960 – Cameroon achieves independence from France and the United Kingdom.
- 1962 – Western Samoa achieves independence from New Zealand; its name is changed to the Independent State of Western Samoa.
- 1964 – The Federation of Rhodesia and Nyasaland is divided into the independent republics of Zambia and Malawi, and the British-controlled Rhodesia.
- 1965 – The People's Democratic Party of Afghanistan is founded in Kabul, Afghanistan.
- 1970 – The defined beginning of Unix time, at 00:00:00.
- 1971 – Cigarette advertisements are banned on American television.
- 1973 – Denmark, Ireland and the United Kingdom are admitted into the European Economic Community.
- 1976 – A bomb explodes on board Middle East Airlines Flight 438 over Qaisumah, Saudi Arabia, killing all 81 people on board.
- 1978 – Air India Flight 855, a Boeing 747, crashes into the Arabian Sea off the coast of Bombay, India, due to instrument failure, spatial disorientation, and pilot error, killing all 213 people on board.
- 1979 – the Joint Communiqué on the Establishment of Diplomatic Relations and Taiwan Relations Act enter into force. Through the Communiqué, the United States establishes normal diplomatic relations with China. Through the Act, the United States guarantees military support for Taiwan.
- 1981 – Greece is admitted into the European Community.
- 1982 – Peruvian Javier Pérez de Cuéllar becomes the first Latin American to hold the title of Secretary-General of the United Nations.
- 1983 – The ARPANET officially changes to using TCP/IP, the Internet Protocol, effectively creating the Internet.
- 1984 – The original American Telephone & Telegraph Company is divested of its 22 Bell System companies as a result of the settlement of the 1974 United States Department of Justice antitrust suit against AT&T.
- 1984 – Brunei becomes independent of the United Kingdom.
- 1985 – The first British mobile phone call is made by Michael Harrison to his father Sir Ernest Harrison, chairman of Vodafone.
- 1985 – Eastern Air Lines Flight 980 crashes into Mount Illimani in Bolivia, killing all 29 aboard.
- 1987 – The Isleta Pueblo tribe elect Verna Williamson to be their first female governor.
- 1988 – The Evangelical Lutheran Church in America comes into existence, creating the largest Lutheran denomination in the United States.
- 1989 – The Montreal Protocol comes into force, stopping the use of chemicals contributing to ozone depletion.
- 1990 – David Dinkins is sworn in as New York City's first black mayor.
- 1990 – Seven people are killed and one injured in a mass shooting in Narsaq, Greenland.
- 1993 – Dissolution of Czechoslovakia: Czechoslovakia is divided into the Czech Republic and Slovak Republic.
- 1994 – The Zapatista Army of National Liberation initiates twelve days of armed conflict in the Mexican state of Chiapas.
- 1994 – The North American Free Trade Agreement (NAFTA) comes into effect.
- 1995 – The World Trade Organization comes into being.
- 1995 – The Draupner wave in the North Sea in Norway is detected, confirming the existence of freak waves.
- 1995 – Austria, Finland and Sweden join the EU.
- 1998 – Following a currency reform, Russia begins to circulate new rubles to stem inflation and promote confidence.
- 1998 – Argentinian physicist Juan Maldacena publishes a landmark paper initiating the study of AdS/CFT correspondence, which links string theory and quantum gravity.
- 1999 – The Euro currency is introduced in 11 member nations of the European Union (with the exception of the United Kingdom, Denmark, Greece and Sweden).
- 2001 – Greece adopts the Euro, becoming the 12th Eurozone country.
- 2004 – In a vote of confidence, General Pervez Musharraf wins 658 out of 1,170 votes in the Electoral College of Pakistan, and according to Article 41(8) of the Constitution of Pakistan, is "deemed to be elected" to the office of President until October 2007.
- 2007 – Bulgaria and Romania join the EU.
- 2007 – Adam Air Flight 574 breaks apart in mid-air and crashes near the Makassar Strait, Indonesia, killing all 102 people on board.
- 2009 – Sixty-six people die in a nightclub fire in Bangkok, Thailand.
- 2010 – A suicide car bomber detonates at a volleyball tournament in Lakki Marwat, Pakistan, killing 105 and injuring 100 more.
- 2011 – A bomb explodes as Coptic Christians in Alexandria, Egypt, leave a new year service, killing 23 people.
- 2011 – Estonia officially adopts the Euro currency and becomes the 17th Eurozone country.
- 2013 – At least 60 people are killed and 200 injured in a stampede after celebrations at Félix Houphouët-Boigny Stadium in Abidjan, Ivory Coast.
- 2015 – The Eurasian Economic Union comes into effect, creating a political and economic union between Russia, Belarus, Armenia, Kazakhstan and Kyrgyzstan.
- 2017 – An attack on a nightclub in Istanbul, Turkey, during New Year's celebrations, kills 39 people and injures 79 others.
- 2023 – Croatia officially adopts the Euro, becoming the 20th Eurozone country, and becomes the 27th member of the Schengen Area.
- 2024 – A 7.5 M_{ww} earthquake strikes the western coast of Japan, killing more than 500 people and injuring over 1,000 others. A majority of direct deaths were due to collapsed homes.
- 2024 – Disney's copyright protection on Steamboat Willie and the original Mickey Mouse expires as they enter the public domain.
- 2024 – Artsakh ceases to exist.
- 2025 – Fourteen people are killed and 57 others injured during a vehicle-ramming and shooting attack in New Orleans, Louisiana.
- 2026 – Bulgaria officially adopts the Euro, becoming the 21st Eurozone country.
- 2026 – A fire at a bar during New Year's Eve celebrations in Crans-Montana, Switzerland, kills 41 people and injures 116 others.

== Births ==
=== Pre-1600 ===
- 766 – Ali al-Ridha, 8th Imam of Twelver Shia Islam (died 818)
- 1431 – Pope Alexander VI (died 1503)
- 1449 – Lorenzo de' Medici, Italian politician (died 1492)
- 1467 – Sigismund I the Old, Polish king (died 1548)
- 1484 – Huldrych Zwingli, Swiss pastor and theologian (died 1531)
- 1511 – Henry, Duke of Cornwall, first-born child of Henry VIII and Catherine of Aragon (died 1511)
- 1557 – Stephen Bocskay, Prince of Transylvania (died 1606)
- 1600 – Friedrich Spanheim, Dutch theologian and academic (died 1649)

=== 1601–1900 ===
- 1628 – Christoph Bernhard, German composer and theorist (died 1692)
- 1655 – Christian Thomasius, German jurist and philosopher (died 1728)
- 1684 – Arnold Drakenborch, Dutch scholar and author (died 1748)
- 1704 – Soame Jenyns, English author, poet, and politician (died 1787)
- 1711 – Baron Franz von der Trenck, Austrian soldier (died 1749)
- 1714 – Giovanni Battista Mancini, Italian soprano and author (died 1800)
- 1714 – Kristijonas Donelaitis, Lithuanian pastor and poet (died 1780)
- 1735 – Paul Revere, American silversmith and engraver (died 1818)
- 1745 – Anthony Wayne, American general and politician (died 1796)
- 1752 – Betsy Ross, American seamstress, sewed flags for the Pennsylvania Navy during the Revolutionary War (died 1836)
- 1768 – Maria Edgeworth, Anglo-Irish author (died 1849)
- 1769 – Marie-Louise Lachapelle, French obstetrician (died 1821)
- 1774 – André Marie Constant Duméril, French zoologist and academic (died 1860)
- 1779 – William Clowes, English publisher (died 1847)
- 1803 – Edward Dickinson, American politician and father of poet Emily Dickinson (died 1874)
- 1806 – Lionel Kieseritzky, Estonian-French chess player (died 1853)
- 1809 – Achille Guenée, French lawyer and entomologist (died 1880)
- 1813 – George Bliss, American politician (died 1868)
- 1814 – Hong Xiuquan, Chinese rebellion leader and king (died 1864)
- 1818 – William Gamble, Irish-born American general (died 1866)
- 1819 – Arthur Hugh Clough, English-Italian poet and academic (died 1861)
- 1819 – George Foster Shepley, American general (died 1878)
- 1823 – Sándor Petőfi, Hungarian poet and activist (died 1849)
- 1833 – Robert Lawson, Scottish-New Zealand architect, designed the Otago Boys' High School and Knox Church (died 1902)
- 1834 – Ludovic Halévy, French author and playwright (died 1908)
- 1839 – Ouida, English-Italian author and activist (died 1908)
- 1848 – John W. Goff, Irish-American lawyer and politician (died 1924)
- 1852 – Eugène-Anatole Demarçay, French chemist and academic (died 1904)
- 1854 – James George Frazer, Scottish anthropologist and academic (died 1941)
- 1854 – Thomas Waddell, Irish-Australian politician, 15th Premier of New South Wales (died 1940)
- 1857 – Tim Keefe, American baseball player (died 1933)
- 1858 – Heinrich Rauchinger, Kraków-born painter (died 1942)
- 1859 – Michael Joseph Owens, American inventor (died 1923)
- 1859 – Thibaw Min, Burmese king (died 1916)
- 1860 – Michele Lega, Italian cardinal (died 1935)
- 1863 – Pierre de Coubertin, French historian and educator, founded the International Olympic Committee (died 1937)
- 1864 – Alfred Stieglitz, American photographer and curator (died 1946)
- 1864 – Qi Baishi, Chinese painter (died 1957)
- 1865 – Harry Coulby, American businessman (died 1929)
- 1867 – Mary Acworth Evershed, English astronomer and scholar (died 1949)
- 1874 – Frank Knox, American publisher and politician, 46th United States Secretary of the Navy (died 1944)
- 1874 – Gustave Whitehead, German-American pilot and engineer (died 1927)
- 1877 – Alexander von Staël-Holstein, German sinologist and orientalist (died 1937)
- 1878 – Agner Krarup Erlang, Danish mathematician, statistician, and engineer (died 1929)
- 1879 – E. M. Forster, English author and playwright (died 1970)
- 1879 – William Fox, Hungarian-American screenwriter and producer, founded the Fox Film Corporation and Fox Theatres (died 1952)
- 1883 – William J. Donovan, American general, lawyer, and politician (died 1959)
- 1883 – Noe Khomeriki, Georgian Social Democrat politician (died 1924)
- 1884 – Chikuhei Nakajima, Japanese lieutenant, engineer, and politician, founded Nakajima Aircraft Company (died 1949)
- 1887 – Wilhelm Canaris, German admiral (died 1945)
- 1888 – Chesley Bonestell, American painter, designer, and illustrator (died 1986)
- 1888 – John Garand, Canadian-American engineer, designed the M1 Garand rifle (died 1974)
- 1888 – Georgios Stanotas, Greek general (died 1965)
- 1889 – Charles Bickford, American actor (died 1967)
- 1889 – Seabury Quinn, American author (died 1969)
- 1890 – Anton Melik, Slovenian geographer and academic (died 1966)
- 1891 – Sampurnanand, Indian educator and politician, 3rd Governor of Rajasthan (died 1969)
- 1892 – Mahadev Desai, Indian author and activist (died 1942)
- 1892 – Artur Rodziński, Polish-American conductor (died 1958)
- 1892 – Manuel Roxas, Filipino lawyer and politician, 5th President of the Philippines (died 1948)
- 1893 – Mordechai Frizis, Greek colonel (died 1940)
- 1893 – Heinie Miller, American football player and coach (died 1964)
- 1894 – Satyendra Nath Bose, Indian physicist and mathematician (died 1974)
- 1894 – Edward Joseph Hunkeler, American clergyman (died 1970)
- 1895 – J. Edgar Hoover, American law enforcement official; 1st Director of the Federal Bureau of Investigation (died 1972)
- 1899 – Randolfo Pacciardi, centre-left Italian politician (died 1991)
- 1900 – Chiune Sugihara, Japanese soldier and diplomat (died 1986)
- 1900 – Xavier Cugat, Spanish-American singer-songwriter and actor (died 1990)

=== 1901–present ===
- 1902 – Buster Nupen, Norwegian-South African cricketer and lawyer (died 1977)
- 1902 – Hans von Dohnányi, German jurist and political dissident (died 1945)
- 1904 – Fazal Ilahi Chaudhry, Pakistani lawyer and politician, 5th President of Pakistan (died 1982)
- 1905 – Stanisław Mazur, Ukrainian-Polish mathematician and theorist (died 1981)
- 1905 – Lise Lindbæk, Norwegian journalist and war correspondent (died 1961)
- 1906 – Manuel Silos, Filipino filmmaker and actor (died 1988)
- 1907 – Kinue Hitomi, Japanese sprinter and long jumper (died 1931)
- 1909 – Dana Andrews, American actor (died 1992)
- 1909 – Stepan Bandera, Ukrainian soldier and politician (died 1959)
- 1909 – Peggy Dennis, American-Russian journalist, author, and activist (died 1993)
- 1911 – Basil Dearden, English director, producer, and screenwriter (died 1971)
- 1911 – Hank Greenberg, American baseball player (died 1986)
- 1911 – Roman Totenberg, Polish-American violinist and educator (died 2012)
- 1911 – Audrey Wurdemann, American poet and author (died 1960)
- 1912 – Boris Vladimirovich Gnedenko, Russian mathematician and historian (died 1995)
- 1912 – Kim Philby, British spy (died 1988)
- 1912 – Nikiforos Vrettakos, Greek poet and academic (died 1991)
- 1914 – Noor Inayat Khan, British SOE agent (died 1944)
- 1917 – Shannon Bolin, American actress and singer (died 2016)
- 1918 – Patrick Anthony Porteous, Scottish colonel, Victoria Cross recipient (died 2000)
- 1918 – Willy den Ouden, Dutch swimmer (died 1997)
- 1919 – Rocky Graziano, American boxer and actor (died 1990)
- 1919 – Carole Landis, American actress (died 1948)
- 1919 – Sheila Mercier, British actress, Emmerdale Farm (died 2019)
- 1919 – Bones McKinney, American basketball player (died 1997)
- 1919 – J. D. Salinger, American soldier and author (died 2010)
- 1920 – Osvaldo Cavandoli, Italian cartoonist (died 2007)
- 1921 – Ismail al-Faruqi, Palestinian-American philosopher and academic (died 1986)
- 1921 – César Baldaccini, French sculptor and academic (died 1998)
- 1921 – Regina Bianchi, Italian actress (died 2013)
- 1921 – Johnny Logan, American basketball player (died 1977)
- 1922 – Ernest Hollings, American soldier and politician, 106th Governor of South Carolina (died 2019)
- 1923 – Barbara Baxley, American actress (died 1990)
- 1923 – Valentina Cortese, Italian actress (died 2019)
- 1923 – Milt Jackson, American jazz vibraphonist and composer (died 1999)
- 1924 – Francisco Macías Nguema, Equatorial Guinean politician, 1st President of the Republic of Equatorial Guinea (died 1979)
- 1925 – Matthew Beard, American child actor (died 1981)
- 1925 – Paul Bomani, Tanzanian politician and diplomat, 1st Tanzanian Minister of Finance (died 2005)
- 1926 – Kazys Petkevičius, Lithuanian basketball player and coach (died 2008)
- 1927 – Maurice Béjart, French-Swiss dancer, choreographer, and director (died 2007)
- 1927 – James Reeb, American clergyman and political activist (died 1965)
- 1927 – Vernon L. Smith, American economist and academic, Nobel Prize laureate
- 1927 – Doak Walker, American football player and businessman (died 1998)
- 1928 – Ernest Tidyman, American author and screenwriter (died 1984)
- 1928 – Gerhard Weinberg, German-American historian, author, and academic
- 1929 – Larry L. King, American journalist, author, and playwright (died 2012)
- 1929 – Haruo Nakajima, Japanese actor and stuntman, portrayed Godzilla from 1954 to 1972 (died 2017)
- 1930 – Ty Hardin, American actor (died 2017)
- 1930 – Frederick Wiseman, American director and producer (died 2026)
- 1932 – Giuseppe Patanè, Italian conductor (died 1989)
- 1933 – James Hormel, American philanthropist and diplomat (died 2021)
- 1933 – Joe Orton, English dramatist (died 1967)
- 1934 – Alan Berg, American lawyer and radio host (died 1984)
- 1934 – Lakhdar Brahimi, Algerian politician, Algerian Minister of Foreign Affairs
- 1935 – Om Prakash Chautala, Indian politician (died 2024)
- 1936 – James Sinegal, American businessman, co-founded Costco
- 1938 – Frank Langella, American actor
- 1939 – Michèle Mercier, French actress
- 1939 – Phil Read, English motorcycle racer and businessman (died 2022)
- 1939 – Senfronia Thompson, American politician
- 1939 – Younoussi Touré, Malian politician, Prime Minister of Mali (died 2022)
- 1940 – Prathia Hall, American civil rights movement activist (died 2002)
- 1942 – Dennis Archer, American lawyer and politician, 67th Mayor of Detroit
- 1942 – Anthony Hamilton-Smith, 3rd Baron Colwyn, English dentist and politician (died 2024)
- 1942 – Country Joe McDonald, American singer-songwriter and guitarist (died 2026)
- 1942 – Alassane Ouattara, Ivorian economist and politician, President of the Ivory Coast
- 1942 – Gennadi Sarafanov, Russian pilot and cosmonaut (died 2005)
- 1943 – Tony Knowles, American soldier and politician, 7th Governor of Alaska
- 1943 – Don Novello, American comedian, screenwriter and producer
- 1943 – Vladimir Šeks, Croatian lawyer and politician, 16th Speaker of the Croatian Parliament
- 1944 – Barry Beath, Australian rugby league player
- 1944 – Jimmy Hart, American professional wrestling manager
- 1944 – Zafarullah Khan Jamali, Pakistani field hockey player and politician, 13th Prime Minister of Pakistan (died 2020)
- 1944 – Teresa Torańska, Polish journalist and author (died 2013)
- 1944 – Mati Unt, Estonian author, playwright, and director (died 2005)
- 1945 – Victor Ashe, American politician and former United States Ambassador to Poland
- 1945 – Jacky Ickx, Belgian racing driver
- 1945 – Jimmy Jones, American basketball player
- 1946 – Rivellino, Brazilian footballer and manager
- 1946 – Claude Steele, American social psychologist and academic
- 1947 – Jon Corzine, American sergeant and politician, 54th Governor of New Jersey
- 1948 – Devlet Bahçeli, Turkish economist, academic, and politician, 57th Deputy Prime Minister of Turkey
- 1948 – Pavel Grachev, Russian general and politician, 1st Russian Minister of Defence (died 2012)
- 1948 – Dick Quax, New Zealand runner and politician (died 2018)
- 1949 – Borys Tarasyuk, Ukrainian politician and diplomat
- 1950 – Wayne Bennett, Australian rugby league player and coach
- 1950 – Tony Currie, English footballer
- 1952 – Shaji N. Karun, Indian director and cinematographer (died 2025)
- 1953 – Gary Johnson, American businessman and politician, 29th Governor of New Mexico
- 1954 – Richard Edson, American actor
- 1954 – Bob Menendez, American lawyer and politician
- 1954 – Dennis O'Driscoll, Irish poet and critic (died 2012)
- 1954 – Yannis Papathanasiou, Greek engineer and politician, Greek Minister of Finance
- 1955 – Mary Beard, English classicist, academic and presenter
- 1955 – LaMarr Hoyt, American baseball player (died 2021)
- 1956 – Sergei Avdeyev, Russian engineer and astronaut
- 1956 – Royce Ayliffe, Australian rugby league player
- 1956 – Christine Lagarde, French lawyer and politician; Managing Director, International Monetary Fund
- 1956 – Mike Mitchell, American basketball player (died 2011)
- 1956 – Martin Plaza, Australian singer-songwriter and guitarist
- 1957 – Evangelos Venizelos, Greek lawyer and politician, Deputy Prime Minister of Greece
- 1958 – Grandmaster Flash, Barbadian rapper and DJ
- 1958 – Dave Silk, American ice hockey player
- 1959 – Abdul Ahad Mohmand, Afghan colonel, pilot, and astronaut
- 1959 – Azali Assoumani, Comorian colonel and politician, President of the Comoros
- 1959 – Panagiotis Giannakis, Greek basketball player and coach
- 1959 – Adrian Hall, English director and former actor
- 1961 – Sam Backo, Australian rugby league player (died 2025)
- 1962 – Anton Muscatelli, Italian-Scottish economist and academic
- 1963 – Milo Aukerman, American singer and songwriter
- 1963 – Jean-Marc Gounon, French racing driver
- 1964 – Dedee Pfeiffer, American actress
- 1966 – Anna Burke, Australian businesswoman and politician, 28th Speaker of the Australian House of Representatives
- 1966 – Ivica Dačić, Serbian journalist and politician, 95th Prime Minister of Serbia
- 1966 – Tihomir Orešković, Croatian–Canadian businessman, 11th Prime Minister of Croatia
- 1967 – Tawera Nikau, New Zealand rugby league player
- 1968 – Davor Šuker, Croatian footballer
- 1969 – Morris Chestnut, American actor
- 1969 – Verne Troyer, American actor (died 2018)
- 1970 – Sergei Kiriakov, Russian footballer and coach
- 1971 – Sammie Henson, American wrestler and coach
- 1971 – Bobby Holík, Czech-American ice hockey player and coach
- 1971 – Jyotiraditya Madhavrao Scindia, Indian politician
- 1972 – Lilian Thuram, French footballer
- 1974 – Christian Paradis, Canadian lawyer and politician, 9th Canadian Minister of Industry
- 1975 – Chris Anstey, Australian basketball player and coach
- 1975 – Joe Cannon, American soccer player and sportscaster
- 1975 – Becky Kellar-Duke, Canadian ice hockey player
- 1975 – Fernando Tatís, Dominican baseball player
- 1976 – Tank, American singer, songwriter, producer, and actor
- 1978 – Arilson Chiorato, Brazilian politician
- 1979 – Vidya Balan, Indian actress
- 1979 – Ibrahim Benli, Danish politician
- 1980 – Elin Nordegren, Swedish-American model
- 1981 – Jonas Armstrong, Irish-English actor
- 1981 – Zsolt Baumgartner, Hungarian racing driver
- 1981 – Mladen Petrić, Croatian footballer
- 1981 – Eden Riegel, American actress
- 1982 – Egidio Arévalo, Uruguayan footballer
- 1982 – David Nalbandian, Argentine tennis player
- 1983 – Calum Davenport, English footballer
- 1983 – Park Sung-hyun, South Korean archer
- 1984 – Paolo Guerrero, Peruvian footballer
- 1984 – Fernando San Emeterio, Spanish basketball player
- 1984 – Michael Witt, Australian rugby league player
- 1985 – Jeff Carter, Canadian ice hockey player
- 1985 – Steven Davis, Northern Irish footballer
- 1985 – Kenoh, Japanese professional wrestler
- 1985 – Tiago Splitter, Brazilian basketball player
- 1986 – Pablo Cuevas, Uruguayan tennis player
- 1986 – Glen Davis, American basketball player
- 1986 – Colin Morgan, Northern Irish actor
- 1986 – Lee Sung-min, South Korean singer
- 1987 – Gia Coppola, American director and screenwriter
- 1987 – Gilbert Brulé, Canadian ice hockey player
- 1987 – Meryl Davis, American ice dancer
- 1987 – Patric Hörnqvist, Swedish ice hockey player
- 1988 – Marcel Gecov, Czech footballer
- 1988 – Dallas Keuchel, American baseball player
- 1989 – Jason Pierre-Paul, American football player
- 1990 – Julia Glushko, Israeli tennis player
- 1990 – Ali Maâloul, Tunisian football player
- 1991 – Glen Rice Jr., American basketball player
- 1991 – Darius Slay, American football player
- 1991 – Xavier Su'a-Filo, American football player
- 1992 – Nathaniel Peteru, New Zealand rugby league player
- 1992 – Shane Duffy, Irish footballer
- 1993 – Larry Nance Jr., American basketball player
- 1993 – Abdoulaye Doucouré, Malian footballer
- 1994 – Brendan Elliot, Australian rugby league player
- 1994 – LaMonte Wade Jr., American baseball player
- 1995 – Sardar Azmoun, Iranian footballer
- 1995 – Poppy, American singer and YouTube personality
- 1996 – Andreas Pereira, Brazilian footballer
- 1996 – Mahmoud Dahoud, German footballer
- 1996 – Mathias Jensen, Danish footballer
- 1997 – Noah Kahan, American singer-songwriter
- 1997 – Keegan Hipgrave, Australian rugby league player
- 1997 – Gonzalo Montiel, Argentine footballer
- 1998 – Cristina Bucșa, Moldovan-Spanish tennis player
- 1998 – Edwuin Cetré, Colombian footballer
- 1998 – Enock Mwepu, Zambian footballer
- 1998 – Frank Onyeka, Nigerian footballer
- 1999 – Tomás Chancalay, Argentine footballer
- 1999 – Azmy Qowimuramadhoni, Indonesian-Azerbaijani badminton player
- 2000 – Nicolas Kühn, German footballer
- 2000 – Ice Spice, American rapper
- 2001 – Angourie Rice, Australian actress
- 2001 – Winter, South Korean singer
- 2002 – Simon Adingra, Ivorian footballer
- 2003 – Daria Trubnikova, Russian rhythmic gymnast
- 2004 – Lamine Camara, Senegalese footballer
- 2007 – Ian Subiabre, Argentine footballer

== Deaths ==
=== Pre-1600 ===
- 138 – Lucius Aelius, adopted son and intended successor of Hadrian (born 101)
- 404 – Telemachus, Christian monk and martyr
- 898 – Odo I, Frankish king (born 860)
- 951 – Ramiro II, king of León and Galicia
- 1031 – William of Volpiano, Italian abbot (born 962)
- 1189 – Henry of Marcy, Cistercian abbot (born c. 1136)
- 1204 – Haakon III, king of Norway (born 1182)
- 1387 – Charles II, king of Navarre (born 1332)
- 1496 – Charles d'Orléans, count of Angoulême (born 1459)
- 1515 – Louis XII, king of France (born 1462)
- 1559 – Christian III, king of Denmark (born 1503)
- 1560 – Joachim du Bellay, French poet and critic (born 1522)

=== 1601–1900 ===
- 1617 – Hendrik Goltzius, Dutch painter and illustrator (born 1558)
- 1697 – Filippo Baldinucci, Florentine historian and author (born 1625)
- 1716 – William Wycherley, English playwright and poet (born 1641)
- 1748 – Johann Bernoulli, Swiss mathematician and academic (born 1667)
- 1766 – James Francis Edward Stuart, Jacobite pretender (born 1688)
- 1780 – Johann Ludwig Krebs, German organist and composer (born 1713)
- 1782 – Johann Christian Bach, German composer (born 1735)
- 1789 – Fletcher Norton, 1st Baron Grantley, English lawyer and politician, British Speaker of the House of Commons (born 1716)
- 1793 – Francesco Guardi, Italian painter and educator (born 1712)
- 1817 – Martin Heinrich Klaproth, German chemist and academic (born 1743)
- 1846 – John Torrington, English sailor and explorer (born 1825)
- 1853 – Gregory Blaxland, Australian farmer and explorer (born 1778)
- 1862 – Mikhail Ostrogradsky, Ukrainian mathematician and physicist (born 1801)
- 1881 – Louis Auguste Blanqui, French activist (born 1805)
- 1892 – Roswell B. Mason, American lawyer and politician, 25th Mayor of Chicago (born 1805)
- 1894 – Heinrich Hertz, German physicist and academic (born 1857)
- 1896 – Alfred Ely Beach, American publisher and lawyer, created the Beach Pneumatic Transit (born 1826)

=== 1901–present ===
- 1901 – Ignatius L. Donnelly, American politician and promoter of pseudoscience and pseudohistory (born 1831)
- 1906 – Hugh Nelson, Scottish-Australian farmer and politician, 11th Premier of Queensland (born 1833)
- 1918 – William Wilfred Campbell, Canadian poet and author (born 1858)
- 1921 – Theobald von Bethmann Hollweg, German lawyer and politician, 5th Chancellor of Germany (born 1856)
- 1923 – Willie Keeler, American baseball player (born 1872)
- 1928 – Loie Fuller, American dancer (born 1862)
- 1929 – Mustafa Necati, Turkish civil servant and politician, Turkish Minister of Environment and Urban Planning (born 1894)
- 1931 – Martinus Beijerinck, Dutch microbiologist and botanist (born 1851)
- 1937 – Bhaktisiddhanta Sarasvati, Indian religious leader, founded the Gaudiya Math (born 1874)
- 1940 – Panuganti Lakshminarasimha Rao, Indian author and educator (born 1865)
- 1943 – Jenő Rejtő, Hungarian journalist (born 1905)
- 1944 – Edwin Lutyens, English architect, designed the Castle Drogo and Thiepval Memorial (born 1869)
- 1944 – Charles Turner, Australian cricketer (born 1862)
- 1953 – Hank Williams, American singer-songwriter and guitarist (born 1923)
- 1955 – Shanti Swaroop Bhatnagar, Indian colloid chemist, academic, and scientific administrator (born 1894)
- 1954 – Duff Cooper, English politician and diplomat, Chancellor of the Duchy of Lancaster (born 1890)
- 1954 – Leonard Bacon, American poet and critic (born 1887)
- 1955 – Arthur C. Parker, American archaeologist and historian (born 1881)
- 1958 – Edward Weston, American photographer (born 1886)
- 1960 – Margaret Sullavan, American actress (born 1909)
- 1961 – Alastair Denniston, Scottish cryptologist (born 1881)
- 1966 – Vincent Auriol, French journalist and politician, 16th President of the French Republic (born 1884)
- 1969 – Barton MacLane, American actor, playwright and screenwriter (born 1902)
- 1971 – Amphilochius of Pochayiv, Ukrainian saint (born 1894)
- 1972 – Maurice Chevalier, French actor and singer (born 1888)
- 1977 – Roland Hayes, American lyric tenor and composer (born 1887)
- 1978 – Carle Hessay, German-Canadian painter (born 1911)
- 1980 – Pietro Nenni, Italian journalist and politician, Italian Minister of Foreign Affairs (born 1891)
- 1981 – Hephzibah Menuhin, American-Australian pianist (born 1920)
- 1982 – Victor Buono, American actor (born 1938)
- 1984 – Alexis Korner, French-English singer-songwriter and guitarist (born 1928)
- 1984 – Joaquín Rodríguez Ortega, known as "Cagancho", Spanish bullfighter (born 1903)
- 1988 – Clementine Hunter, American folk artist (born 1886 or 1887)
- 1992 – Grace Hopper, American computer scientist and admiral, co-developed COBOL (born 1906)
- 1994 – Arthur Porritt, Baron Porritt, New Zealand physician and politician, 11th Governor-General of New Zealand (born 1900)
- 1994 – Cesar Romero, American actor (born 1907)
- 1994 – Edward Arthur Thompson, Irish historian and academic (born 1914)
- 1995 – Eugene Wigner, Hungarian-American physicist and mathematician, Nobel Prize laureate (born 1902)
- 1996 – Arleigh Burke, American admiral (born 1901)
- 1996 – Arthur Rudolph, German-American engineer (born 1906)
- 1997 – Townes Van Zandt, American singer-songwriter, guitarist, and producer (born 1944)
- 1998 – Helen Wills, American tennis player and coach (born 1905)
- 2001 – Ray Walston, American actor (born 1914)
- 2002 – Julia Phillips, American film producer and author (born 1944)
- 2003 – Joe Foss, American soldier, pilot, and politician, 20th Governor of South Dakota (born 1915)
- 2005 – Shirley Chisholm, American educator and politician (born 1924)
- 2005 – Ngo Van, Vietnamese revolutionary (born 1913)
- 2006 – Harry Magdoff, American economist and journalist (born 1913)
- 2007 – Roland Levinsky, South African-English biochemist and academic (born 1943)
- 2007 – Tillie Olsen, American short story writer (born 1912)
- 2007 – Darrent Williams, American football player (born 1982)
- 2008 – Pratap Chandra Chunder, Indian educator and politician (born 1919)
- 2009 – Claiborne Pell, American politician (born 1918)
- 2009 – Helen Suzman, South African anti-apartheid activist and politician (born 1917)
- 2010 – Lhasa de Sela, American-Mexican singer-songwriter (born 1972)
- 2012 – Bob Anderson, English fencer (born 1922)
- 2012 – Kiro Gligorov, Macedonian lawyer and politician, 1st President of the Republic of Macedonia (born 1917)
- 2012 – Nay Win Maung, Burmese physician, businessman, and activist (born 1962)
- 2012 – Tommy Mont, American football player and coach (born 1922)
- 2013 – Christopher Martin-Jenkins, English journalist (born 1945)
- 2013 – Patti Page, American singer and actress (born 1927)
- 2014 – Higashifushimi Kunihide, Japanese monk and educator (born 1910)
- 2014 – William Mgimwa, Tanzanian banker and politician, 13th Tanzanian Minister of Finance (born 1950)
- 2014 – Juanita Moore, American actress (born 1914)
- 2015 – Ulrich Beck, German sociologist (born 1944)
- 2015 – Mario Cuomo, American lawyer and politician, 52nd Governor of New York (born 1932)
- 2015 – Donna Douglas, American actress (born 1932)
- 2015 – Omar Karami, Lebanese lawyer and politician, 58th Prime Minister of Lebanon (born 1934)
- 2015 – Boris Morukov, Russian physician and astronaut (born 1950)
- 2015 – William Lloyd Standish, United States District Judge (born 1930)
- 2016 – Fazu Aliyeva, Russian poet and journalist (born 1932)
- 2016 – Dale Bumpers, American soldier, lawyer, and politician, 38th Governor of Arkansas (born 1925)
- 2016 – Vilmos Zsigmond, Hungarian-American cinematographer and producer (born 1930)
- 2017 – Tony Atkinson, British economist (born 1944)
- 2017 – Yvon Dupuis, Canadian politician (born 1926)
- 2018 – Robert Mann, American violinist (born 1920)
- 2018 – Jon Paul Steuer, American actor (born 1984)
- 2019 – Paul Neville, Australian politician (born 1940)
- 2019 – Pegi Young, American singer, songwriter, environmentalist, educator and philanthropist (born 1952)
- 2019 – George, last known Achatinella apexfulva (born c. 2004)
- 2020 – Lexii Alijai, American rapper (born 1998)
- 2020 – Alexander Frater, British travel writer and journalist (born 1937)
- 2020 – Don Larsen, American baseball player (born 1929)
- 2020 – Barry McDonald, Australian rugby union player (born 1940)
- 2020 – David Stern, American lawyer and businessman (born 1942)
- 2021 – Carlos do Carmo, Portuguese fado singer (born 1939)
- 2021 – Mark Eden, English actor (born 1928)
- 2021 – Elmira Minita Gordon, Belizean educator and psychologist (born 1930)
- 2021 – Floyd Little, American football player (born 1942)
- 2022 – Gary Burgess, British broadcaster and journalist (born 1975)
- 2022 – Dan Reeves, American football player and coach (born 1944)
- 2023 – Fred White, American musician and songwriter (born 1955)
- 2024 – Lynja, American celebrity chef and YouTuber (born 1956)
- 2025 – David Lodge, English author and critic (born 1935)
- 2025 – Chad Morgan, Australian musician (born 1933)
- 2025 – Wayne Osmond, American singer-songwriter and actor (born 1951)

== Holidays and observances ==
- Christian feast day:
  - Basil the Great (Eastern Orthodox Church)
  - Feast of the Circumcision of Christ
    - Feast of the Holy Name of Jesus (Anglican Communion, Lutheran Church)
  - Fulgentius of Ruspe
  - Solemnity of Mary, Mother of God; and its related observances:
    - World Day of Peace
  - January 1 (Eastern Orthodox liturgics)
- The last day of Kwanzaa (African Americans)
- The eighth of the Twelve Days of Christmas (Western Christianity)
- Global Family Day
- Jump-up Day (Montserrat)
- New Year's Day (Gregorian calendar)
  - Japanese New Year
  - Novy God Day (Russia)
- Polar Bear Swim Day
- Public Domain Day (multiple countries)
- Triumph of the Revolution (Cuba)
