= 2014 Kalenga by-election =

← 2010	16 March 2014	2015 →

The Kalenga constituency in the Tanzanian Parliament
- Turnout: 29,541 (41.05%)
Candidate	Godfrey Mgimwa	Grace Tendega
Party	CCM	Chadema
Popular vote	22,962	5,853
Percentage	79.27	20.21
MP before election
William Mgimwa
CCM
Elected MP
Godfrey Mgimwa
CCM

The Kalenga by-election was a by-election held for the Tanzanian parliamentary constituency of Kalenga. It was triggered by the death of William Mgimwa, the previous Member of Parliament (MP) and former Finance Minister, who had held the seat for the Chama Cha Mapinduzi since 2010. The by-election took place on 16 March 2014 and the CCM candidate won by a landslide.

== Results ==
Election	Political result	Candidate	Party	Votes	%	±%
Kalenga by-election, 2014; Death of William Mgimwa; 576 spoilt votes Electorate: 71,965; Turnout: 29,541 (41.05%) −10.69	CCM hold Majority: 17,109 (59.07%)	Godfrey Mgimwa	CCM	22,962	79.27	−5.12
Kalenga by-election, 2014; Death of William Mgimwa; 576 spoilt votes Electorate: 71,965; Turnout: 29,541 (41.05%) −10.69	CCM hold Majority: 17,109 (59.07%)	Grace Tendega	Chadema	5,853	20.21	+11.2
Kalenga by-election, 2014; Death of William Mgimwa; 576 spoilt votes Electorate: 71,965; Turnout: 29,541 (41.05%) −10.69	CCM hold Majority: 17,109 (59.07%)	Richard Minja	CHAUSTA	150	0.52	-
