= Janet Mbene =

Tanzanian politician

Honourable Janet Mbene MP

Deputy Minister of Industry, Trade and Marketing
- Incumbent
- Assumed office 20 January 2014
- Minister: Abdallah Kigoda
- Preceded by: Gregory Teu

Deputy Minister of Finance
- In office 7 May 2012 – 20 January 2014
- Minister: William Mgimwa
- Succeeded by: Adam Malima

Member of Parliament
- Incumbent
- Assumed office 12 June 2012
- Appointed by: Jakaya Kikwete
- Constituency: None (Nominated MP)

Personal details
- Born: 14 June 1952 (age 74) Tanganyika
- Party: CCM
- Domestic partner: Augustine Mahiga
- Education: IFM (AdvDip); UDSM (BA); UNE (GradDipAgEc), (MEc)

Janet Zebedayo Mbene (born 14 June 1952) is a Tanzanian CCM politician and a nominated member of parliament. She was the Deputy Minister of Industry, Trade and Marketing.
