= Zakia Meghji =

Tanzanian politician

Honourable Zakia Meghji MP
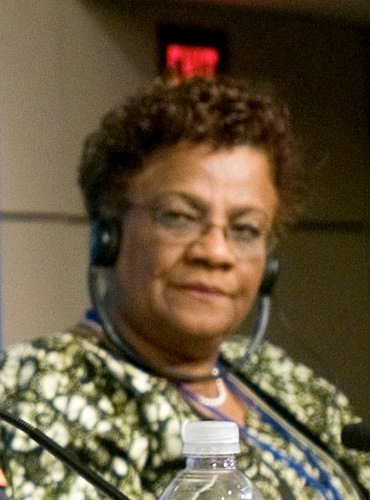

Chama Cha Mapinduzi Secretary for Economic Affairs and Finance
- Incumbent
- Assumed office November 2012
- Chairman: Jakaya Kikwete; John Magufuli
- Preceded by: Mwigulu Nchemba

11th Minister of Finance
- In office January 2006 – February 2008
- President: Jakaya Kikwete
- Preceded by: Basil Mramba
- Succeeded by: Mustafa Mkulo

Minister of Natural Resources and Tourism
- In office 1997–2005
- President: Benjamin Mkapa
- Preceded by: Juma Ngasongwa
- Succeeded by: Anthony Diallo

Minister of Health
- In office 1994–1997
- President: Ali Hassan Mwinyi (1994-95); Benjamin Mkapa (1995-97)

Deputy Minister of Health
- In office 1992–1994
- President: Ali Hassan Mwinyi

Member of Parliament
- Incumbent
- Assumed office 2005
- Appointed by: Jakaya Kikwete
- Constituency: None (Nominated MP)

Personal details
- Born: 31 December 1946 (age 79) Zanzibar
- Party: CCM
- Occupation: politician
- Profession: Teacher

Zakia Hamdani Meghji (born 31 December 1946) is a Tanzanian politician who served as the first female Minister of Finance from 2006 to 2008. She was the first woman to hold this post. She also served as the Tourism minister, and is still the longest serving Tourism Minister in the country's history.

== Career ==
From 1997 to 2005 she was the Minister of Natural Resources and Tourism. She was the Minister of Finance from 2006 to 2008.
