= Godfrey Zambi =

Tanzanian politician

Honourable Godfrey Zambi MP

Deputy Minister of Agriculture, Food Security and Cooperatives
- Incumbent
- Assumed office 20 January 2014
- Minister: Christopher Chiza
- Preceded by: Adam Malima

Member of Parliament for Mbozi East, and regional commission at mtwara in tanzaniaa
- Incumbent
- Assumed office December 2005
- Preceded by: Edson Halinga

Personal details
- Born: 12 June 1962 (age 64) Tanganyika
- Party: CCM
- Education: University of Dar es Salaam

Godfrey Weston Zambi (born 12 June 1962) is a Tanzanian CCM politician and Former Member of Parliament for Mbozi East constituency since 2005. He served as a Mbozi MP for ten years. Region commissioner Lindi
