= Gregory Teu =

Tanzanian politician (1951–2021)

Honourable Gregory Teu MP

Deputy Minister of Industry, Trade and Marketing
- In office 7 May 2012 – 20 January 2014
- Minister: Abdallah Kigoda
- Succeeded by: Janet Mbene

Deputy Minister of Finance and Economic Affairs
- In office 28 November 2010 – 7 May 2012
- Minister: Mustafa Mkulo

Member of Parliament for Mpwapwa
- In office November 2010 – November 2015
- Preceded by: George Lubeleje
- Succeeded by: George Lubeleje

Personal details
- Born: 3 February 1951 Tanganyika
- Died: 25 January 2021 (aged 69) Arusha, Tanzania
- Party: CCM
- Education: Mzumbe University (AdvDip); Uni. of Central England (MSc)

Gregory George Teu (3 February 1951 – 25 January 2021) was a Tanzanian CCM politician and Member of Parliament for Mpwapwa constituency from 2010 to 2015. From 2012 to 2014 he was also Deputy Minister of Industry, Trade and Marketing.

Teu died on 25 January 2021, from COVID-19.
