= Mgimwa =

Mgimwa is a surname. Notable people with the surname include:

- Godfrey Mgimwa (born 1981), Tanzanian politician
- Mahmoud Mgimwa (born 1963), Tanzanian politician
- William Mgimwa (1950–2014), Tanzanian politician
