= Christopher Chiza =

Tanzanian politician

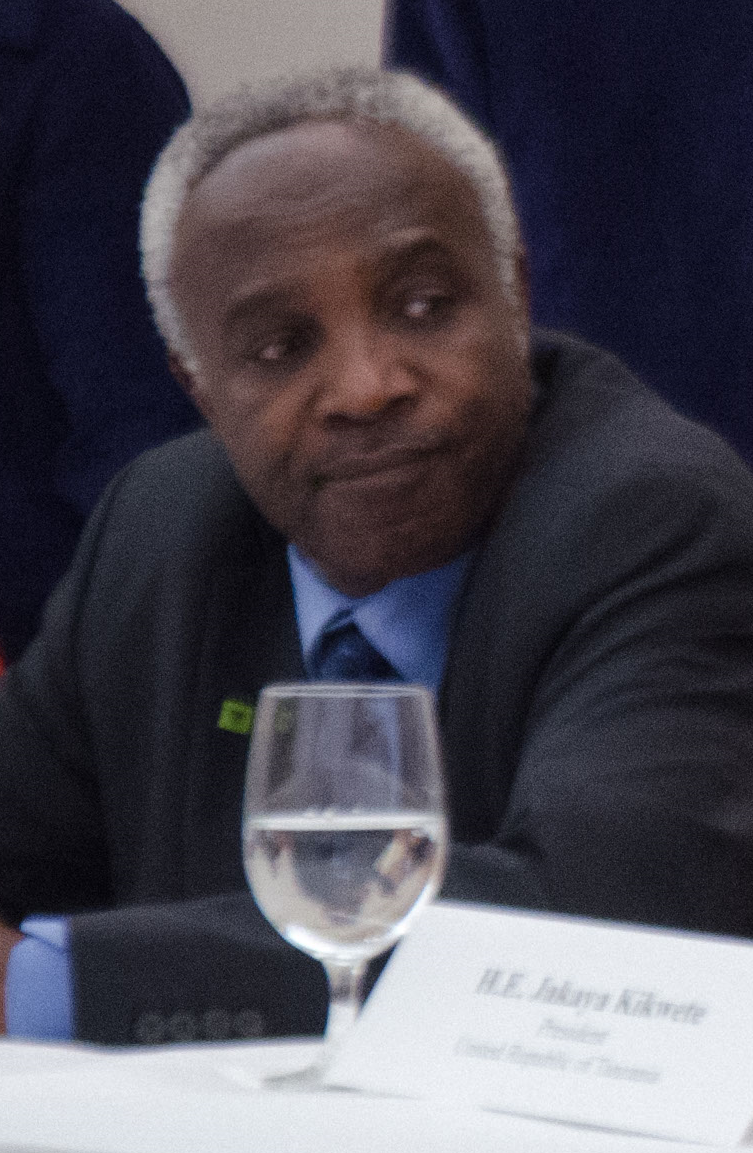

Minister of Agriculture, Food and Cooperatives
- In office 7 May 2012 – 5 November 2015
- President: Jakaya Kikwete

Deputy Minister of Agriculture, Food Security and Co-operatives
- In office 28 November 2010 – 7 May 2012
- Minister: Jumanne Maghembe
- Succeeded by: Adam Malima
- In office 6 January 2006 – 13 February 2008
- Minister: Joseph Mungai

Deputy Minister of Water and Irrigation
- In office 13 February 2008 – 28 November 2010

Member of Parliament for Buyungu
- In office December 2005 – July 2015
- Preceded by: Beatus Magayane
- Succeeded by: Kasuku Bilago

Personal details
- Born: 13 April 1953 (age 73) Tanganyika
- Party: CCM
- Education: University of Dar es Salaam; Southampton University (MSc)
- Profession: Engineer

Christopher Kajoro Chiza (born 13 April 1953) is a Tanzanian CCM politician and Member of Parliament for Buyungu constituency since 2005 until 2015. He is the current Minister of Agriculture, Food and Cooperatives
