= Adam Malima =

Tanzanian politician

Honourable Adam Malima MP

Deputy Minister of Finance and Economic Affairs
- Incumbent
- Assumed office 20 January 2014
- Minister: Saada Salum
- Preceded by: Janet Mbene

Deputy Minister of Agriculture, Food and Cooperatives
- In office 7 May 2012 – 20 January 2014
- Preceded by: Christopher Chiza
- Succeeded by: Godfrey Zambi

Deputy Minister of Energy and Minerals
- In office 28 November 2010 – 7 May 2012
- Minister: William Ngeleja

Member of Parliament for Mkuranga
- Incumbent
- Assumed office December 2005
- Preceded by: Hussein Mwinyi

Personal details
- Born: 26 June 1966 (age 60) Dar es Salaam, Tanzania
- Party: Chama Cha Mapinduzi
- Spouse: Naima Mwapwani Chondo Malima
- Relations: Asanterabi, Amani Kighoma Malima, Akilimali Malima, Fadhili Malima(brother)
- Children: Ali Adam, Abdallah Adam, Amina Adam, Aaliyah Adam, Akiylah Adam, Ameera Habiyba Adam
- Parent: Kighoma Malima
- Education: University of Havana (MSc); SOAS (PGDip), (MSc)
- Profession: Economist

Adam Kighoma Ali Malima (born 26 June 1966) is a Tanzanian CCM politician and former Member of Parliament for Mkuranga constituency from 2010 to 2015. He was also the Deputy Minister of Finance and Economic Affairs.
