= Ministry of Agriculture, Livestock and Fisheries =

The Ministry of Agriculture, Livestock and Fisheries may refer to:

- Ministry of Agriculture, Livestock and Fisheries (Tanzania) - the former ministry of Tanzania,
- Ministry of Agriculture (Kenya) - the full name of Kenya's agriculture ministry.
- Ministère de l'Agriculture, de l'Elevage et de la Pêche - the ministry of Madagascar
