= Khury =

Khury is a surname. Notable people with the surname include:

- Gui Khury (born 2008), Brazilian skateboarder
- Alexandre Maranhão Khury (born 1979, known as Alexandre Curi), Brazilian politician
