= Saada Salum =

Tanzanian politician

Honourable Saada Salum MP
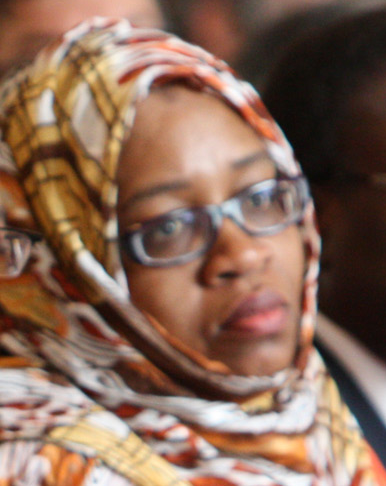

14th Minister of Finance
- In office 20 January 2014 – 5 November 2015
- President: Jakaya Kikwete
- Preceded by: William Mgimwa
- Succeeded by: Philip Mpango

Deputy Minister of Finance
- In office 7 May 2012 – 20 January 2014
- Minister: William Mgimwa
- Succeeded by: Mwigulu Nchemba

Member of Parliament
- In office 12 June 2012 – July 2015
- Appointed by: Jakaya Kikwete
- Constituency: None (Nominated MP)

Personal details
- Born: 1975 (age 50–51)
- Party: CCM
- Education: Open University of Tanzania; Heriot-Watt University (MBA)

Saada Mkuya Salum (born 1975) is a Tanzanian CCM politician and a nominated Member of Parliament. She is a former Minister of Finance.

== Early life and education ==
She was educated at Lumumba Secondary School, and attained her Diploma in Business Studies from Stamford College in Malaysia. She graduated from The Open University of Tanzania in 2009 with a master's degree in Business and also attained her MBA from Heriot-Watt University. As of January 2014, she is pursuing her PhD in business administration from The Open University of Tanzania.

== Political career ==
She was nominated as a Member of Parliament by President Kikwete in May 2012 and subsequently appointed the Deputy Minister of Finance. In January 2014, Salum succeeded William Mgimwa as the 14th Minister of Finance.
