= Daniel Yona =

Tanzanian politician (born 1941)

9th Minister of Finance
- In office 1997–2000
- President: Benjamin Mkapa
- Preceded by: Simon Mbilinyi
- Succeeded by: Basil Mramba

Member of Parliament for Same East
- In office 2000–2005
- President: Benjamin Mkapa
- Succeeded by: Anne Malecela

Personal details
- Born: 3 May 1941 (age 85) Tanganyika Territory
- Party: CCM
- Education: IFM; University of Strathclyde (BA)
- Known for: Convicted of crimes committed during his tenure as Minister of Finance
- Criminal information
- Status: Imprisoned at Keko Prison
- Criminal charges: Misuse of office and corruption
- Penalty: 3 years imprisonment

Daniel Yona (born 3 May 1941) is a Tanzanian CCM politician and a former Member of Parliament for Same East constituency. In 2015, he and former finance minister Basil Mramba were sentenced to three years' imprisonment for awarding an audit contract to UK firm Alex Stewart Assayers which meant its operations in Tanzania were exempt from tax. After seven months in prison, the remainder of Mramba's and Yona's sentence was commuted to community service.
