= Legislative Assembly of Paraná =

Coordinates: 25°24′55″S 49°16′2″W

Legislative Assembly of Paraná Assembleia Legislativa do Paraná
- 20th legislature

Type
- Type: Unicameral

History
- Founded: 12 July 1854

Leadership
- President: Alexandre Curi, REP since 3 February 2025
- Government Leader: Hussein Bakri, PSD
- Opposition Leader: Arilson Chiorato, PT

Structure
- Seats: 54 deputies
- Political groups: PSD (15) PP (7) UNIÃO (7) PT (6) PL (5) MDB (3) Solidarity (3) PDT (2) Podemos (2) Republicans (2) Cidadania (1) PSB (1)
- Length of term: 4 years

Elections
- Voting system: Open list proportional representation
- Last election: 4 October 2026
- Next election: 7 October 2030

Meeting place
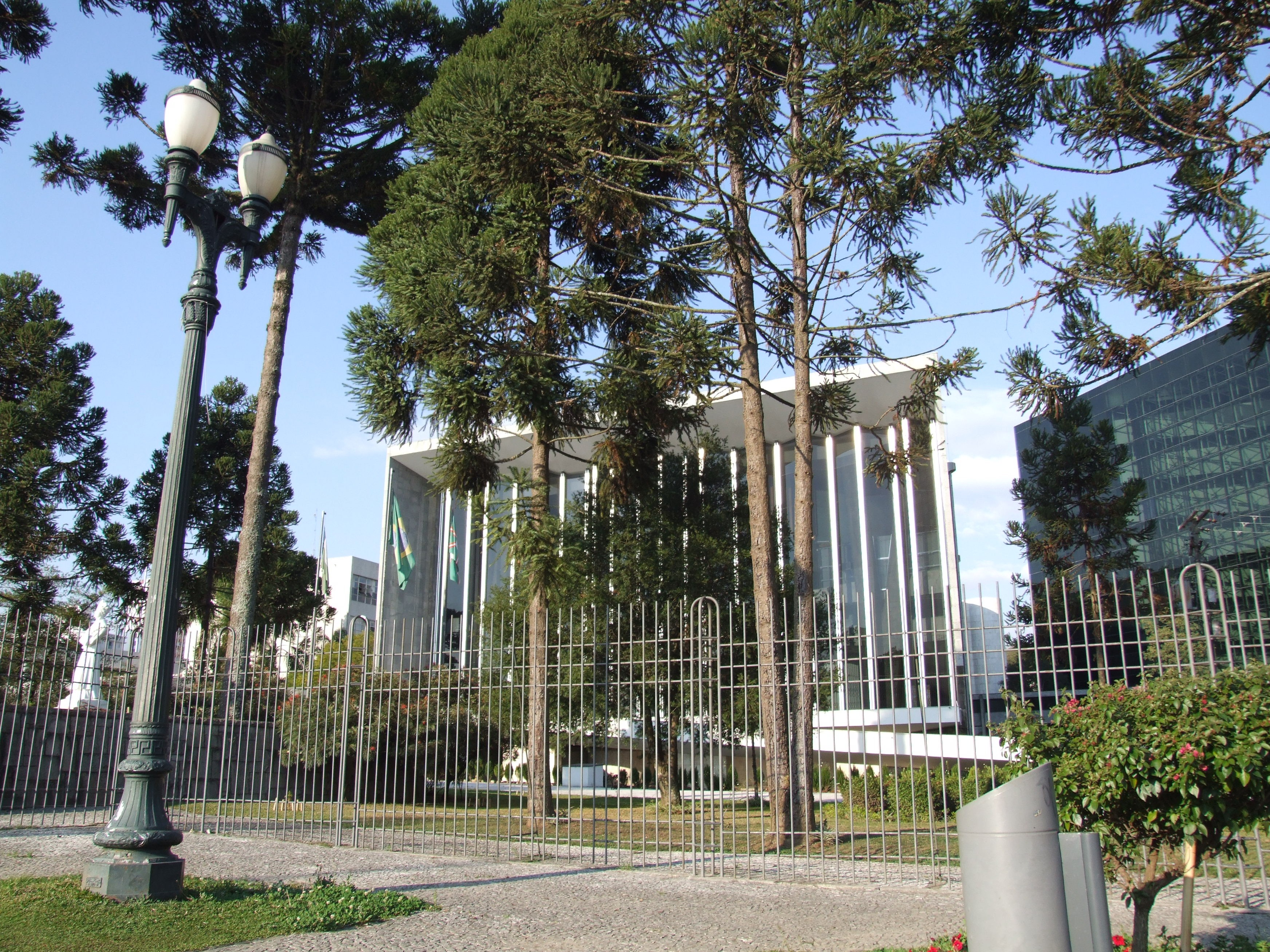
- Legislative Assembly building Curitiba, Paraná

Website
- www.assembleia.pr.leg.br

The Legislative Assembly of Paraná (Portuguese: Assembleia Legislativa do Paraná) is the unicameral legislature of Paraná state in Brazil. It has 54 state deputies elected by proportional representation.

The Assembly began on December 19, 1853 when Paraná became a province (before it was a territory of São Paulo).
