= Jakaya Kikwete Convention Centre =

Dodoma Convention Centre
- Interactive map of Dodoma Convention Centre
- Location: Dodoma, Tanzania
- Coordinates: 6°11′14″S 35°45′44″E
- Owner: Chama Cha Mapinduzi

Construction
- Built: 2012–2015

The Dodoma Convention Centre is a convention centre in the Tanzanian capital of Dodoma. It was inaugurated by President Jakaya Kikwete on 9 July 2015.
