= Hussein Bashe =

Tanzanian politician

Hussein Mohamed Bashe MP
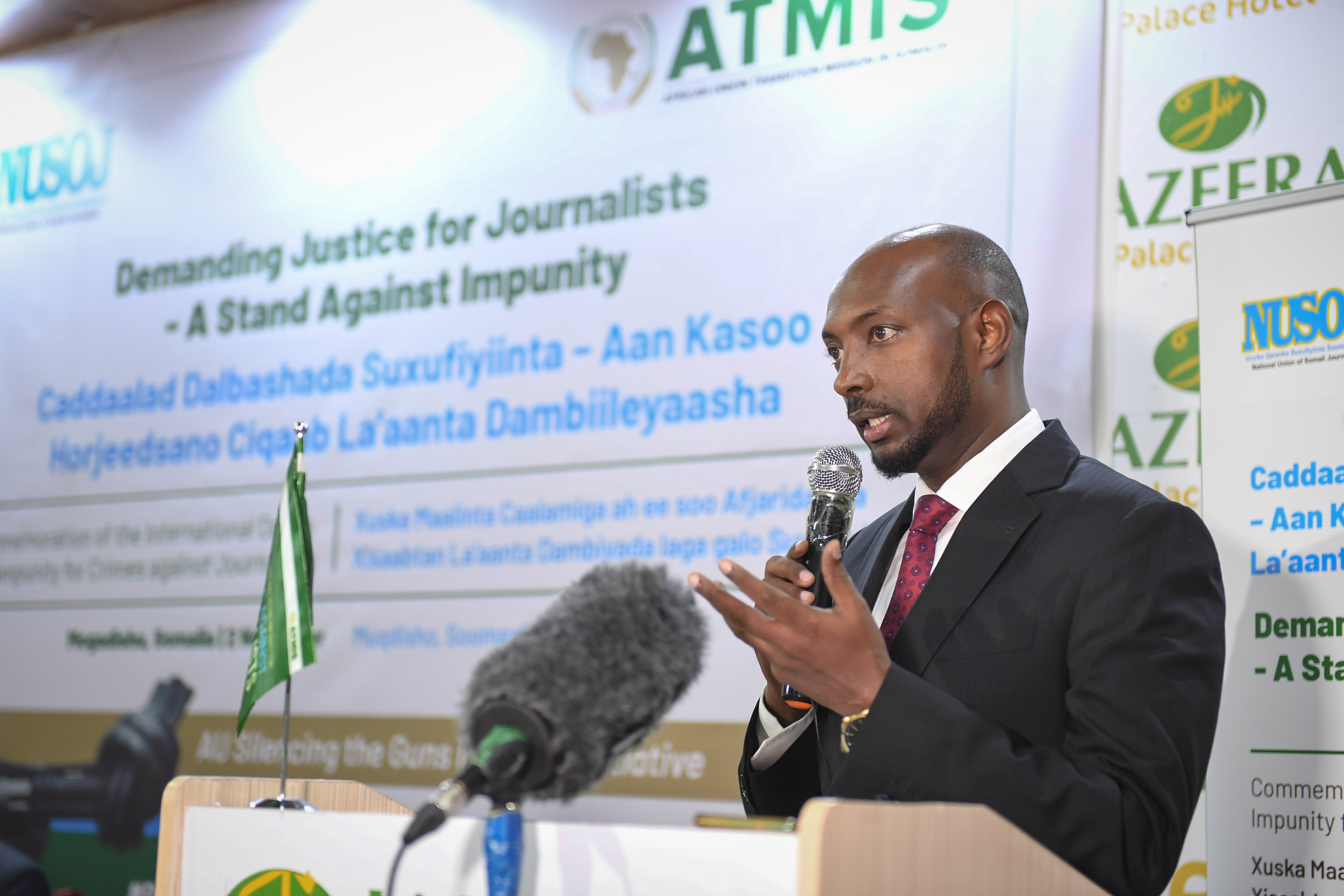

Minister of Agriculture
- Incumbent
- Assumed office 10 January 2022
- President: Samia Suluhu
- Preceded by: Adolf Mkenda

Member of Parliament for Nzega Urban
- Incumbent
- Assumed office 12 December 2015

Personal details
- Born: 26 August 1975 (age 51) Nzega, Tabora, Tanzania
- Party: CCM
- Education: Mzumbe University (BSc)
- Website: husseinbashe.org

Hussein Mohamed Bashe (born 26 August 1975) is a Tanzanian CCM politician and Member of Parliament for Nzega Urban constituency since 2015. In January 2022, he was appointed Agriculture Minister.

== Political career ==
Bashe has consistently been affiliated with the Chama Cha Mapinduzi party and has made multiple attempts to run for the Nzega Urban constituency, his birthplace, across several general elections. He came third in the primary in 2005. However, in the 2010 primary, he contested in the primaries and defeated Lucas Selelii who was trying to retain the constituency. Despite winning the party primary, Bashe was disqualified from the race by the ruling CCM's Central Committee due to allegations surrounding his citizenship status. Later on, the government confirmed Bashe's legal citizenship, however, this was not in time for the ticket.

In the subsequent 2015 election, he won the primary and Bashe triumphed with 18,774 votes, defeating his closest rival, Charles Mabula from the Chadema party, who received 9,568 votes. He successfully ran for re-election in 2020, securing his seat with 84.58% of the popular vote and a total of 16,082 votes.

On 22 July 2019, he got his first major cabinet position as he was appointed as deputy Minister of Agriculture by John Magufuli. He continued this role in Samia Suluhu Hassan's presidency and was promoted to the minister of agriculture in January 2022.
