= Basil Mramba =

Tanzanian politician (1940–2021)

10th Minister of Finance
- In office 2001 – 21 December 2005
- President: Benjamin Mkapa
- Preceded by: Daniel Yona
- Succeeded by: Zakia Meghji

4th Minister of Industry and Trade
- In office 2006–2008
- President: Benjamin Mkapa
- Preceded by: Nazir Karamagi
- Succeeded by: Mary Nagu
- In office 1986–1989
- Succeeded by: J. C. Rwegasira

1st Director General of Small Industries Development Organization (SIDO Tanzania)
- In office 1972–1983

2nd Chancellor of Open University of Tanzania
- President: Benjamin Mkapa
- Preceded by: Simon Mbilinyi
- Succeeded by: John Malecela

Personal details
- Born: 15 May 1940 Tanganyika
- Died: 17 August 2021 (aged 81) Dar es Salaam, Tanzania
- Party: CCM
- Spouse: Awaichi Mramba
- Children: Godfrey Mramba, Aifena Mramba, Lillian Kalise Mramba, Remla Mramba, Janet Mramba
- Education: Makerere University (BA); City University London (MBA)
- Known for: Convicted of crimes committed during his tenure as Minister of Finance
- Criminal information
- Status: Imprisoned at Keko Prison
- Criminal charges: Misuse of office and corruption
- Penalty: 3 years imprisonment

Basil Pesambili Mramba (15 May 1940 – 17 August 2021) was a Tanzanian CCM politician who served as Member of Parliament for the Rombo constituency from 2004 to 2014.

== Biography ==
In 2015, he and former minister Daniel Yona were sentenced to three years' imprisonment for awarding an audit contract to UK firm Alex Stewart Assayers which meant its operations in Tanzania were exempt from tax. After seven months in prison, the remainder of Mramba's and Yona's sentence was commuted to community service.

He died from complications of COVID-19 on 17 August 2021 in Dar es Salaam at the age of 81 during the COVID-19 pandemic in Tanzania.
