= Charles Tizeba =

Tanzanian politician

Honourable Dr Charles Tizeba MP

Minister of Agriculture
- In office 12 December 2015 – 10 November 2018
- President: John Magufuli
- Succeeded by: Japhet Hasunga

Deputy Minister of Transport
- In office 7 May 2012 – 12 December 2015
- Minister: Harrison Mwakyembe

Member of Parliament for Buchosa District
- Incumbent
- Assumed office November 2010
- Preceded by: Samuel Chitalilo

Sikonge District Commissioner
- In office 2006–2010
- President: Jakaya Kikwete

Personal details
- Born: 1 January 1961 (age 65) Tanganyika
- Party: CCM
- Education: Dar Technical College (BSc); Kalinin Polytechnical Inst. (MSc); Tver State Technical Uni. (PhD)

Charles John Tizeba (born 1 January 1961) is a Tanzanian CCM politician and Member of Parliament for Buchosa District constituency since 2010. He was the Deputy Minister of Transport. He was later appointed minister of agriculture.

On November 10, 2018, he was dismissed as Agriculture Minister on grounds of under-performance along with his counterpart Charles Mwijage, Minister for Trade and Investment.
