= Kikwete Bridge =

Kikwete Bridge Daraja la Kikwete (Swahili)
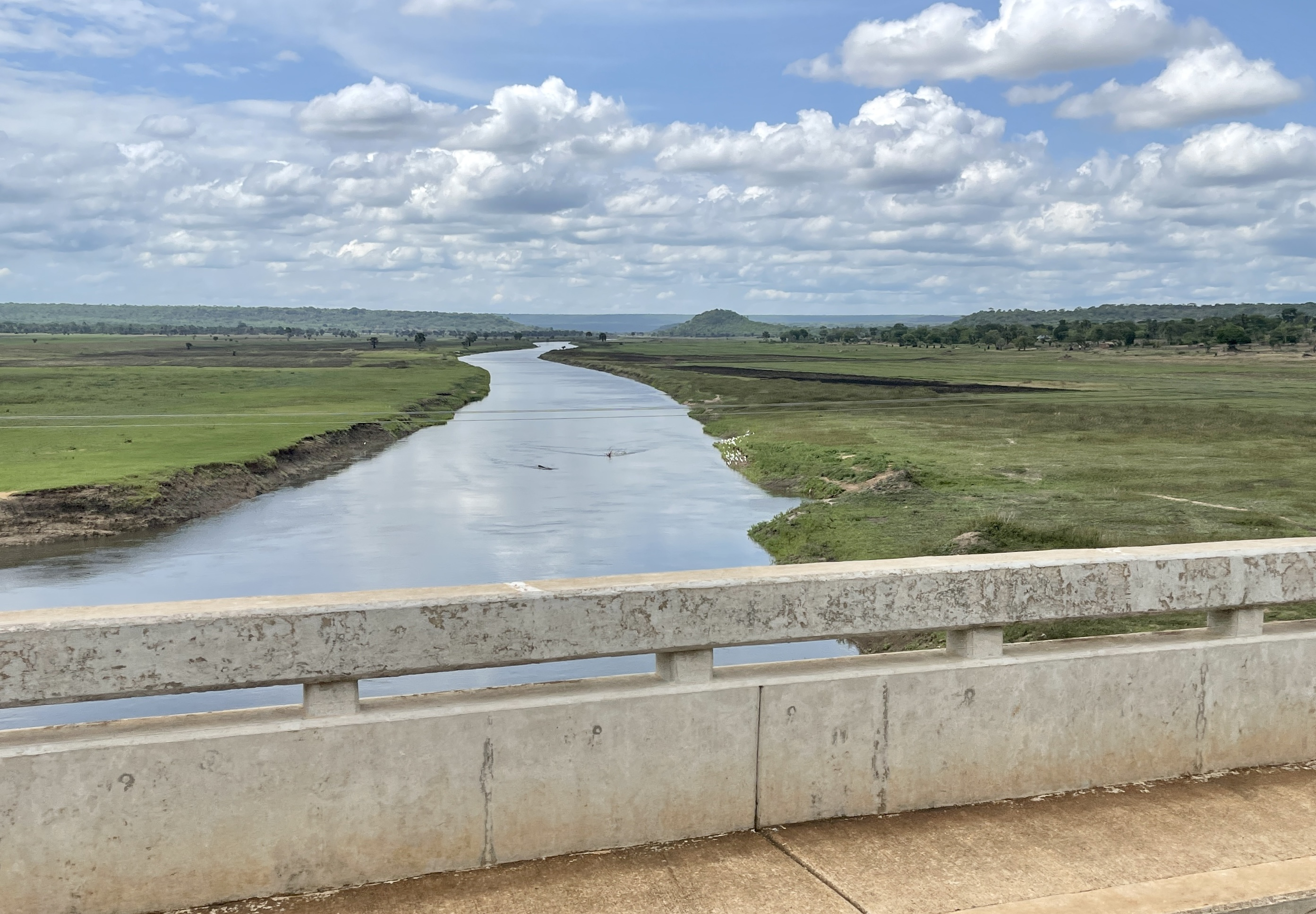
- Coordinates: 5°5′39.2″S 30°49′23″E
- Carries: B8 road (2 lanes)
- Crosses: Malagarasi River
- Locale: Uvinza, Tanzania
- Owner: Government of Tanzania

Characteristics
- Total length: 275 metres (902 ft)
- No. of spans: 7

History
- Engineering design by: Hanil Engineering and Construction Co. Ltd (South Korea)
- Construction start: December 2010
- Construction end: September 2015
- Construction cost: US$56 million
- Replaces: Malagarasi Bridge

Location
- Interactive map of Kikwete Bridge

Kikwete Bridge is a bridge across the Malagarasi River in Tanzania.

It was officially opened on September 16, 2015 by President Jakaya Kikwete, whose name it bears.
