= Ministry of Agriculture, Livestock and Fisheries (Tanzania) =

Ministry overview
- Preceding agencies: Ministry of Agriculture, Food Security and Cooperatives; Ministry of Livestock and Fisheries Development
- Dissolved: October 2017
- Superseding agencies: Ministry of Agriculture; Ministry of Livestock and Fisheries
- Jurisdiction: Government of Tanzania

The Ministry of Agriculture, Livestock and Fisheries was a former ministry of the Government of Tanzania.

== History ==
The Ministry was formed by the amalgamation of the former Ministry of Agriculture, Food Security and Cooperatives and Ministry of Livestock and Fisheries Development in John Magufuli's first cabinet.

The ministry was split again into two similar ministries in October 2017 to improve efficiency, creating the Ministry of Agriculture and Ministry of Livestock and Fisheries.

== Ministers ==
Minister for Agriculture, Livestock and Fisheries
Portrait	Name	Term of office		Party	President
	Mwigulu Nchemba	December; 2015	June; 2016	Chama Cha Mapinduzi	John Magufuli
	Charles Tizeba	12 June 2016	October; 2017	Chama Cha Mapinduzi	John Magufuli
Ministry split into Minisitry of Agriculture and Ministry of Livestock and Fisheries
