= Ministry of Agriculture (Tanzania) =

Government ministry of Tanzania

- Wizara ya Kilimo

Ministry overview
- Formed: October 2017
- Preceding Ministry: Ministry of Agriculture, Livestock and Fisheries
- Jurisdiction: Tanzania
- Minister responsible: Hussein Mohamed Bashe
- Deputy Minister responsible: Anthony Mavunde
- Website: www.kilimo.go.tz

The Ministry of Agriculture is a ministry of the Government of Tanzania.

== History ==
The ministry was formed following the split of the Ministry of Agriculture, Livestock and Fisheries in October 2017 to improve efficiency, with the livestock and fisheries roles being created into the Ministry of Livestock and Fisheries.

== Ministers ==
Parties

CCM

Minister for Agriculture
Portrait	Name	Term of office		President
	Charles Tizeba	October 2017	10 November 2018	John Magufuli
	Japhet Hasunga	10 November 2018	16 June 2020	John Magufuli
	Adolf Mkenda	5 December 2020	18 March 2021	John Magufuli
	Adolf Mkenda	18 March 2021	10 January 2022	Samia Suluhu Hassan
	Hussein Bashe	10 January 2022	Incumbent	Samia Suluhu Hassan
