= Asanterabi Malima =

Tanzanian researcher (born 1979)

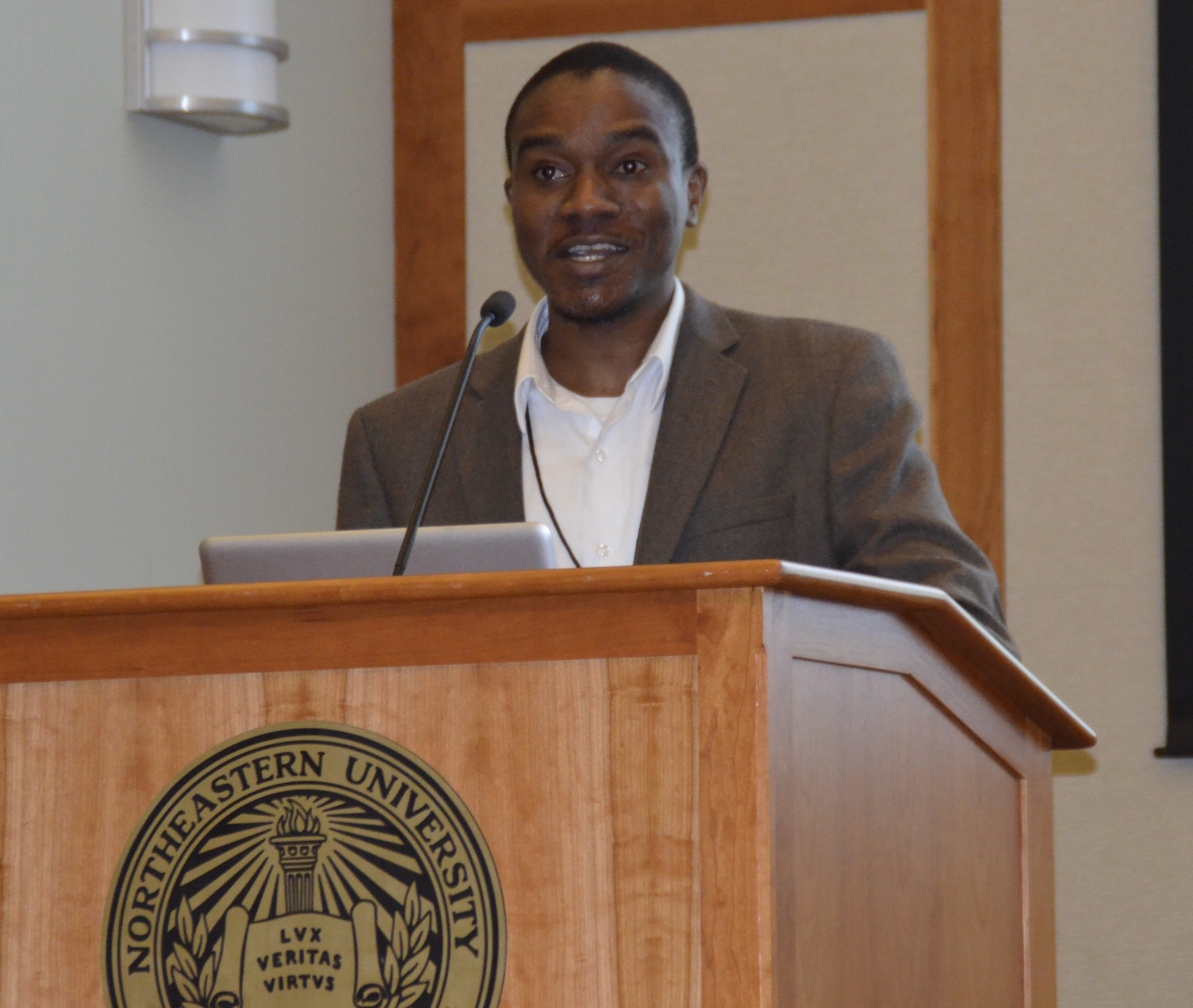
- Born: 30 September 1979 (age 46); Dar es Salaam, Tanzania
- Education: Osmangazi University (BSc); Sabancı University (MSc); Northeastern University (PhD)
- Parent: Kighoma Malima
- Relatives: Adam Malima (brother)
- Website: asantemalima.com

Asanterabi Malima (born 30 September 1979) is a Tanzanian researcher.

== Early life and education ==
Malima was born in Dar es Salaam. He was educated at Azania Secondary and Aga Khan High schools.

== Personal life ==
He is the son of former Tanzanian Finance Minister Kighoma Malima and the brother of the incumbent Deputy Finance Minister Adam Malima.
