= Marjorie Mbilinyi =

- Born: 1943 (age 82–83)
- Citizenship: Tanzania
- Occupations: Academic; Lecturer
- Organization(s): University of Dar-es-Salaam; TGNP
- Known for: Gender Equality Activist
- Spouse: Simon Mbilinyi (m. 1967)

Marjorie Mbiliniyi (born 1943) is a scholar, feminist and gender activist. She was born in New York and studied educational sciences before settling in Dar-es-Salaam and became a citizen of Tanzania after married a Tanzanian. She worked at the Department of Education at Dar-es-Salaam university. Mbiliniyi has dedicated herself to collaborate with and organize women to fight against patriarchy and neo-liberalism in Tanzania and beyond. She worked as a lecturer at the University of Dar es Salaam where she retired in 2003. After her retirement from academia, she served as the Principal Policy Analyst at the Tanzania Gender Networking Program; later known as TGNP Mtandao from 2004–2014.

== Personal life ==
She is married to Simon Mbilinyi, former minister and member of parliament who was the first chancellor of Open University of Tanzania.

== Works ==
Marjorie Mbilinyi has published 21 books and reports authored or co-authored and/or edited, including:

- Nyerere on Education (co-editor with Elieshi Lema, Rakesh Rajani; 2004)
- Activist Voices: Feminist Struggles for an Alternative World (co-editor with Mary Rusimbi, Chachage S L Chachage and Demere Kitunga, 2003)
- Against Neoliberalism: Gender, Democracy & Development (co-editor Chachage S L Chachage, 2003)
- Food is Politics (with KIHACHA, 2002)
- Gender Patterns in Micro and Small Enterprises of Tanzania (Editor, 2000); Gender Profile of Tanzania (editor, TGNP, 1993)
- Reviving Local Self-Reliance (coeditor with Wilbert Gooneratne, 1992)
- Big Slavery: Agribusiness and the Crisis in Women’s Employment in Tanzania (1991)
- Women in Tanzania (co-authored with Ophelia Mascarenhas, 1983)
