= Family of Jakaya Kikwete =

Family of Tanzanian president

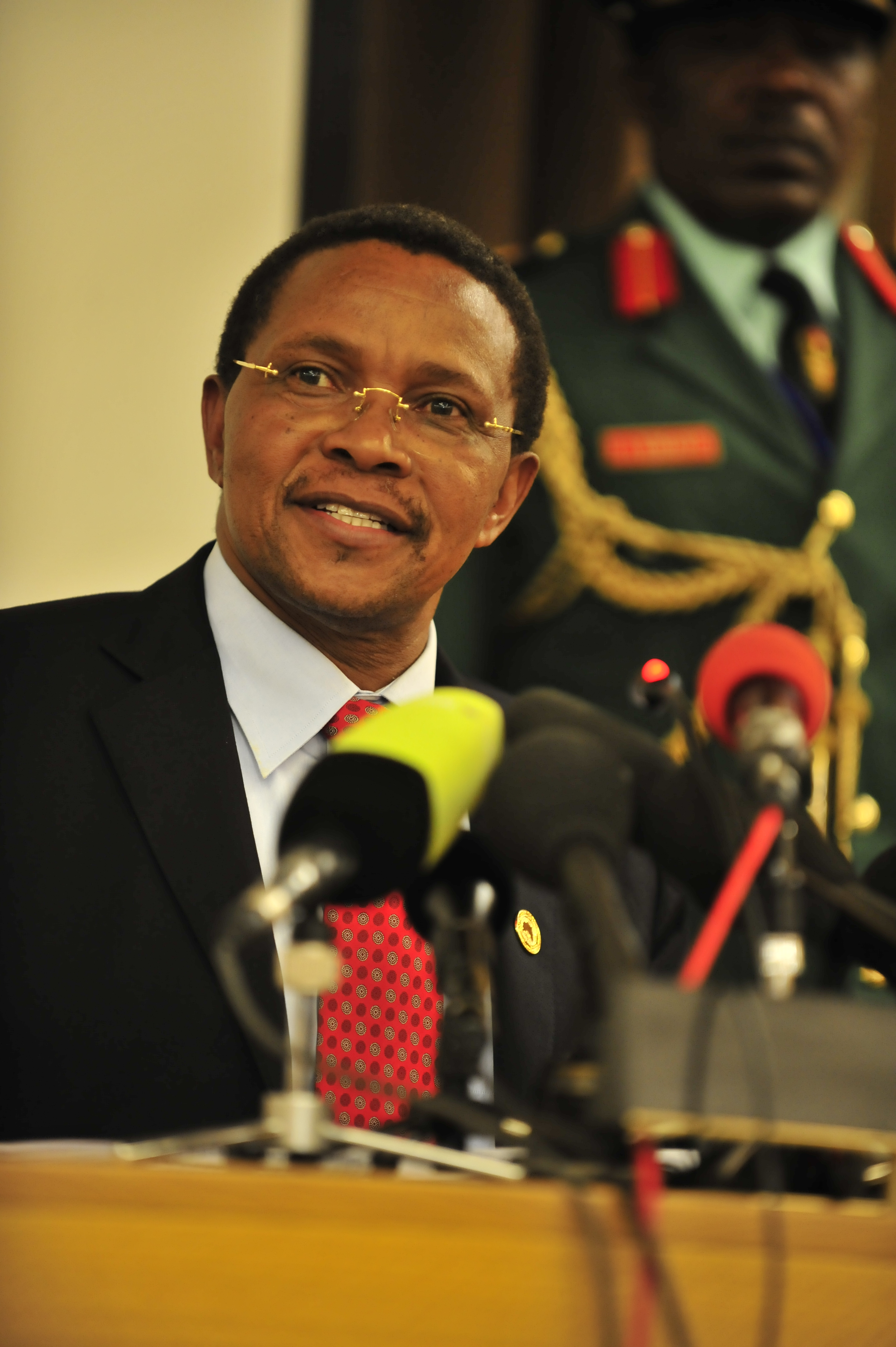
Jakaya Kikwete

The family of Jakaya Kikwete refers to the family of the 4th President of Tanzania. His immediate family is the First Family of Tanzania.

== Immediate family ==
=== Spouse ===
Kikwete married Salma Kikwete in 1989. This was his second marriage.

=== Children ===
- Ridhiwani kikwete
- Salama
- Miraj
- Ally
- Khalifa
- MwanaAsha
- Khalfan
- Rashid
- Mohamed
