= Simon Mbilinyi =

Tanzanian politician

8th Minister of Finance
- In office 1995–1996
- President: Benjamin Mkapa
- Preceded by: Jakaya Kikwete
- Succeeded by: Daniel Yona

1st Chancellor of Open University of Tanzania
- President: Ally Hassan Mwinyi
- Succeeded by: Basil Mramba

Personal details
- Born: Tanganyika Territory
- Party: CCM
- Spouse: Prof. Marjorie Mbilinyi
- Education: Cornell University (BSc); Stanford University (MA); UDSM (PhD)

Simon Mbilinyi is a Tanzanian CCM politician and a former Member of Parliament for Peramiho constituency. He was a Tanzanian Ambassador to Belgium and Luxembourg from 1985–1989 and served as the Finance Minister from 1995–1996.
