= Mwigulu Nchemba =

Tanzanian economist and politician

Honourable Mwigulu Nchemba MP
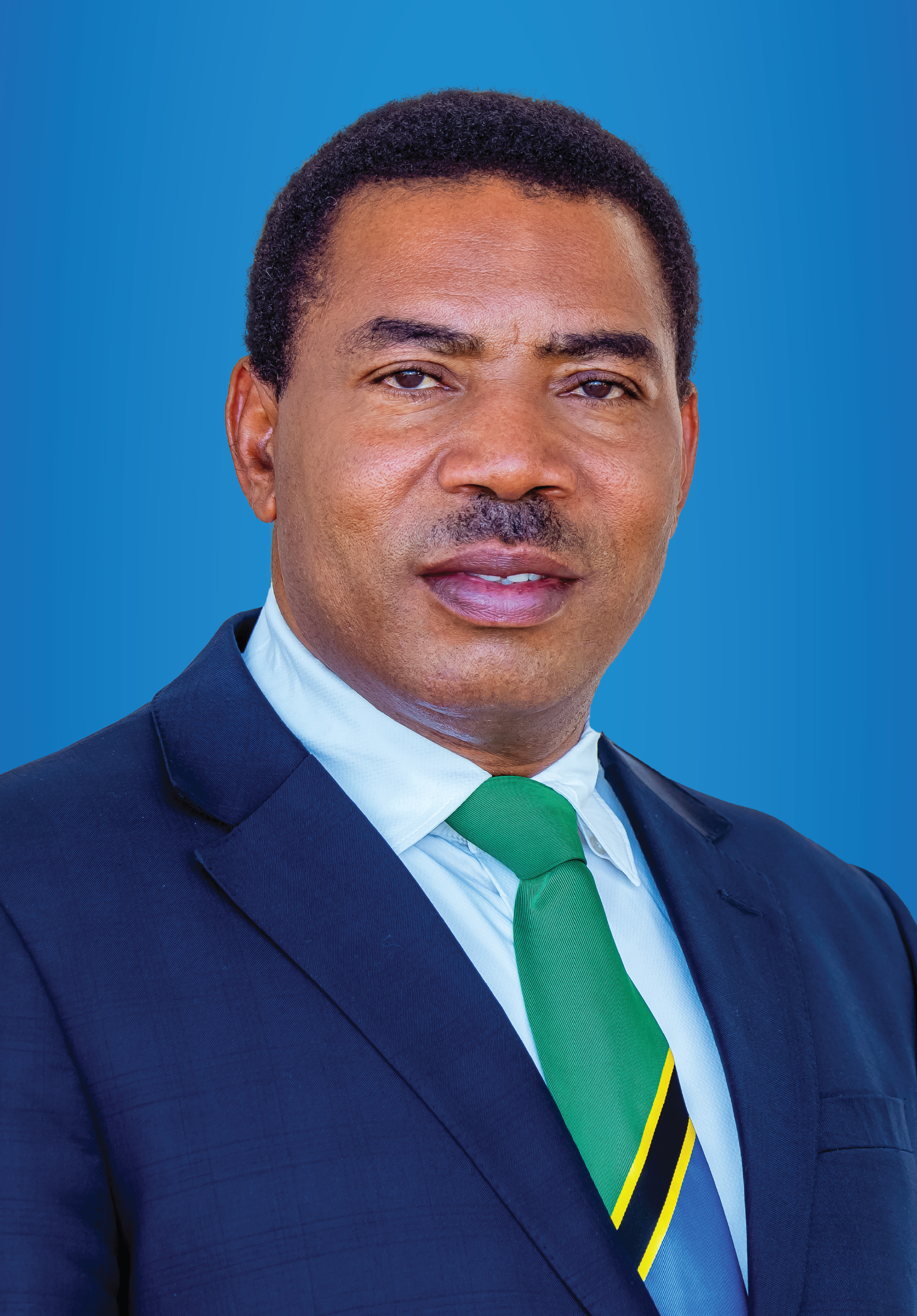
- Official portrait, 2026

11th Prime Minister of Tanzania
- Incumbent
- Assumed office 13 November 2025
- President: Samia Suluhu Hassan
- Preceded by: Kassim Majaliwa

Minister of Finance
- In office 31 March 2021 – 3 November 2025
- President: Samia Suluhu Hassan
- Preceded by: Philip Mpango

Minister of Justice and Constitutional Affairs
- In office 2 May 2020 – 31 March 2021
- President: John Magufuli
- Preceded by: Augustine Mahiga
- Succeeded by: Palamagamba Kabudi

Minister of Home Affairs
- In office 11 June 2016 – 1 July 2018
- President: John Magufuli
- Preceded by: Stephen Wassira
- Succeeded by: Alphaxard Lugola

Minister of Agriculture, Livestock and Fisheries
- In office November 2015 – June 2016
- President: John Magufuli
- Succeeded by: Charles Tizeba

Member of Parliament for Iramba West
- Incumbent
- Assumed office November 2010
- Preceded by: Juma Hassan Killimbah

Personal details
- Born: 7 January 1975 (age 51) Makunda, Iramba District
- Party: CCM
- Education: University of Dar es Salaam

Mwigulu Lameck Nchemba (born 7 January 1975) is a Tanzanian economist and CCM politician, who has served as the elected Member of Parliament for Iramba West Constituency since 2010. On 13 November 2025, President Samia Suluhu Hassan appointed him as the Prime Minister of Tanzania, succeeding Kassim Majaliwa. Before his current appointment, he served as the Minister of Finance in the Tanzanian Cabinet, since March 2021.

== Background and education ==
Nchemba was born on 7 January 1975 in Iramba District, in the Singida Region of Tanzania. He attended Makunda Primary School, then transferred to Ilboru Secondary School for his middle school education. He completed his A-Level schooling at Mazengo Secondary School, graduating in 2000 with the equivalent of a High School Diploma.

In 2001 he was admitted to the University of Dar es Salaam, graduating with a Bachelor of Economics degree in 2004. He went on to obtain a Master of Economics degree in 2006, also from Dar es Salaam University. He later obtained a Doctor of Philosophy degree in Economics from the same university.

== Career ==
Before joining elective Tanzanian politics, Nchemba worked as an economist at the Bank of Tanzania. Later, President Jakaya Kikwete appointed him as Minister of Finance and Economic Planning. His tenure at the finance ministry coincided with the "Tegeta escrow scandal", which involved the embezzlement of hundreds of million of dollars by high-ranking government officials. Nchemba, who was not implicated, maintained that the full extent of the law should apply to those involved.

He was appointed the Minister of Agriculture, Livestock and Fisheries in December 2015, by the then incoming president John Magufuli. Following the death of Augustine Mahiga, he was appointed the Minister of Constitutional and Legal Affairs.

Following the formation of the 6th Cabinet of Tanzania, on 31 March 2021, Philip Mpango was promoted to Vice-President of Tanzania, Nchemba took over the post of Minister of Finance and Planning. On 4 July 2023, he retained his position of Minister of Finance, however, the Ministry of planning was moved under the president's office. He was nominated as Prime Minister of Tanzania by Suluhu on 13 November 2025 following the 2025 Tanzanian general election.

== Other activities ==
- World Bank, Ex-Officio Member of the Board of Governors (since 2021)

== See also ==
- Cabinet of Tanzania
- Parliament of Tanzania
- Economy of Tanzania
