= Godfrey Mgimwa =

Tanzanian politician (born 1981)

Honourable Godfrey Mgimwa MP

Member of Parliament for Kalenga
- Incumbent
- Assumed office 6 May 2014
- Succeeded by: William Mgimwa
- Majority: 22,962 (79.27%)

Personal details
- Born: 24 August 1981 (age 45)
- Party: CCM
- Spouse: Robby
- Parent: William Mgimwa
- Education: London Met (B.Bus)
- Profession: Banker

Godfrey William Mgimwa (born 24 August 1981) is a Tanzanian CCM politician.

== Early life and career ==
Mgimwa was born in Iringa Region. He is the son of former Tanzanian Finance Minister William Mgimwa. He was educated at Wilolesi Primary, Azania Secondary and St Mary's High School. In 2014, he won the Kalenga by-election by a landslide receiving 22,962 votes (79.27%).
