= George Lubeleje =

Tanzanian politician

Honourable George Malima Lubeleje MP

Member of Parliament for Mpwapwa
- Incumbent
- Assumed office December 2015

Personal details
- Born: 12 February 1950 (age 76)
- Party: Chama Cha Mapinduzi

George Malima Lubeleje (born February 12, 1950) is a Tanzanian politician and a member of the Chama Cha Mapinduzi political party. He was elected MP representing Mpwapwa in 2015.
