= Buchosa District =

District in Mwanza, Tanzania

- District
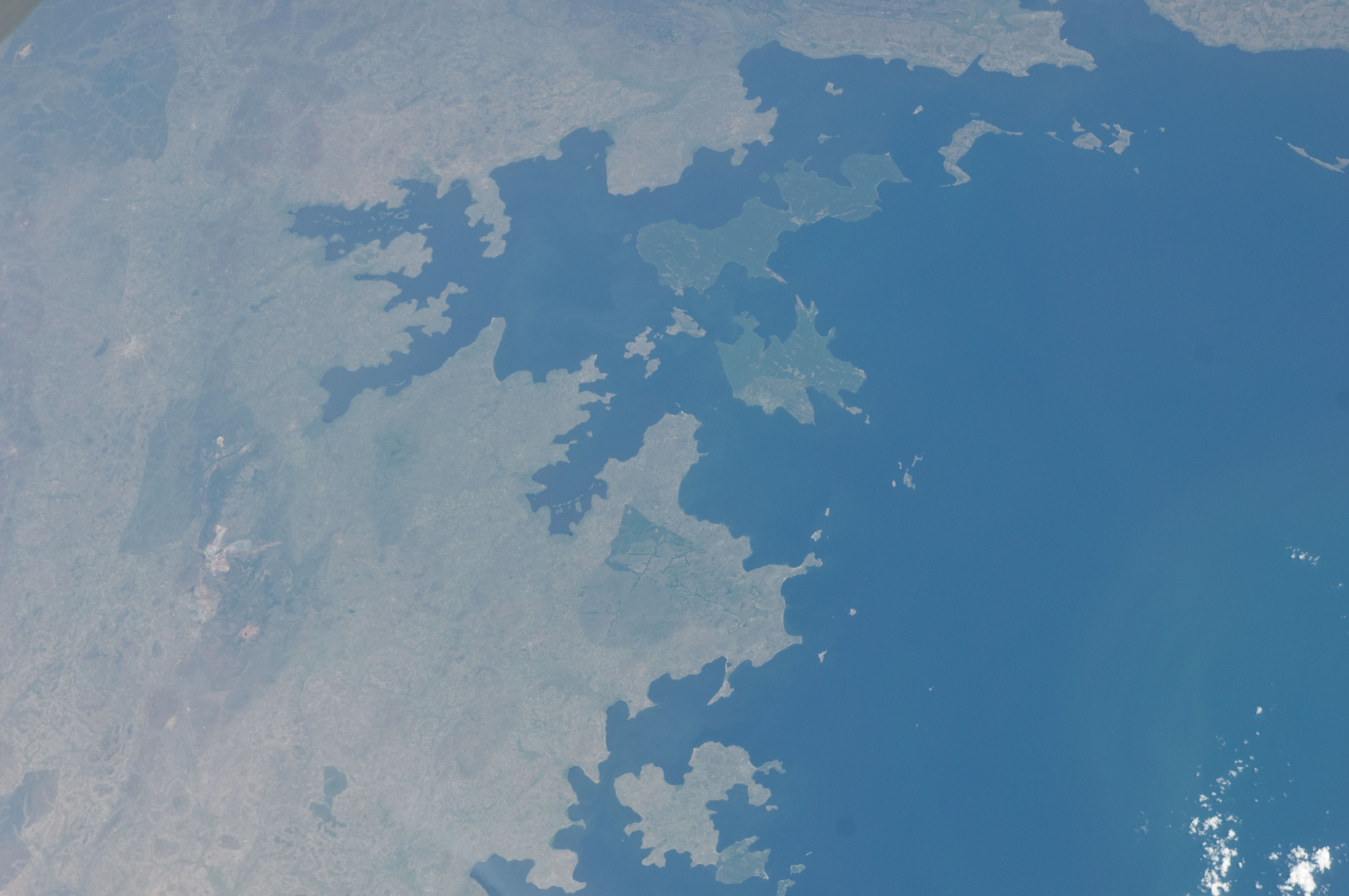
- Buchosa District and islands seen from the International Space Station.

- Buchosa District in Mwanza Region of Tanzania
- Coordinates: 2.434°S 32.314°E
- Country: Tanzania
- Region: Mwanza Region
- District: Buchosa District
- Established: 2015

Government
  - Type: Council
  - Chairman: Julius Mulongo
  - Director: Mheshimiwa Idama

Area
  - Total: 4,480 km^{2} (1,730 sq mi)
  - Land: 1,535 km^{2} (593 sq mi)
  - Water: 2,945 km^{2} (1,137 sq mi)

Population (2016)
  - Total: 369,201
  - Density: 240.5/km^{2} (622.9/sq mi)
- Time zone: EAT
- Postcode: 33xxx
- Area code: 028
- Website: District Website

Buchosa District, is a district in the Mwanza Region in the southern coastal Tanzania. The district is on the south shore of Lake Victoria west of the city of Mwanza and north of the Geita Region. Much of the district is large islands in the lake. The district was established in 2015, But the process started in the year 2000.

== Geography ==
The district lies on islands and the southern shore of Lake Victoria. To the east is the Sengerema District that is also in the Mwanza Region. To the south and west is the Geita District of the Geita Region. Of the 4,480 square kilometres (1,730 sq mi) area of the district most, 2,945 km^{2} (1,137 sq mi), is water and only 1,535 km^{2} (593 sq mi) is land.

=== Climate ===
The district's climate is tropical savanna with the Aw Koppen-Geiger system classification. There are two wet seasons, and one dry season. The primary wet season is October through December, and the secondary wet seasons is March and April. The dry seasons runs from late June to early September. The average rainfall is 1,414 millimetres (55.7 in) annually, and average temperature is 22.3 °C (72.1 °F).

=== Administrative areas ===
The district consists of two divisions, 22 wards, 82 villages, and 410 hamlets.

Wards (2016 Population)

- Bangwe (13,102)
- Bugoro (5,124)
- Buhama (14,051)
- Bukokwa (20,072)
- Bulyaheke (39,850)
- Bupandwa (20,446)
- Iligamba (13,565)
- Irenza (13,274)
- Kafunzo (12,101)
- Kalebezo (21,357)
- Kasisa (13,982)
- Katwe (14,120)
- Kazunzu (15,841)
- Lugata (23,704)
- Luhuza (7,744)
- Maisome (18,573)
- Nyakaliro (18,035)
- Nyakasasa (2,920)
- Nyakasungwa (9,466)
- Nyanzenda (23,265)
- Nyehunge (40,242)
- Luharanyonga (8,367)

== Demographics ==
In 2016 the Tanzania National Bureau of Statistics report there were 369,201 people in the district, from 327.767 in 2012. The district is made up of primarily people of the Zinza, Jita, Kerewe, Kara and Sukuma tribes. The average household size in 6.9 people.

== Economy ==
Buchosa District's economy is mostly farming and livestock keeping at 80% of the economy being agriculture. Of the 153,510 ha (379,300 acres) of land in the district, 132,019 ha (326,230 acres), which is 83%, is arable. Of that, 62,049 ha (153,330 acres), which is 47% of arable land, is currently cultivated. Buchosa is the largest producer of maize in the regions, and second largest producer of cassava. Other food crops include sweet potatoes, and is the only district in the region to grow rice. Cash crops are maize and cotton.

Buchosa District has a significant portion of the regions forest. The district has 14,964 ha (36,980 acres) of the regions 32,901 ha (81,300 acres) natural forest, and 33,000 ha (82,000 acres) of the regions 35,634 ha (88,050 acres) forest plantations.

The district has no large, medium or small industry. There is fishing in the district with 1,280,503 tons in 2015.

== Roads ==
Buchosa District has no paved roads. For unpaved roads the district has 22.3 km (13.9 mi) of regional gravel roads, 79.4 km (49.3 mi) of district gravel or dirt roads, and 627.2 km (389.7 mi) of feeder dirt roads. The district has the most unpaved roads in the region of 728.9 km (452.9 mi) which in the wet season are unusable.

== Parks ==
Parts of the Rubondo Island National Park is in the district. The park consists of Rubondo Island, of the Geita Region, and other nearby islands along the southern shore of Lake Victoria. Wildlife on the islands are elephants, giraffes, chimpanzees, hippopotamus, crocodiles, sitatunga, bushbucks, suni, pythons, and pigs. There are also many water birds and fish eagles in the park.
