= Mustafa Mkulo =

Tanzanian politician (1946–2024)

Honorable Mustafa Mkulo MP
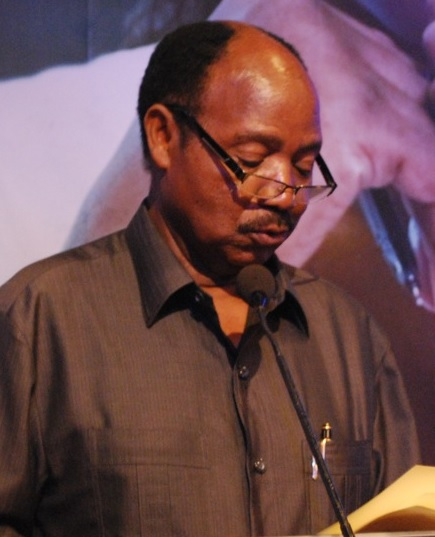

12th Minister of Finance
- In office 13 February 2007 – 7 May 2012
- Preceded by: Zakia Meghji
- Succeeded by: William Mgimwa

Member of Parliament for Kilosa
- In office December 2005 – 3 May 2024
- Preceded by: Alhab Abdallah

Director General of the National Social Security Fund
- In office 1987–2000

Personal details
- Born: 26 September 1946 Tanganyika Territory
- Died: 3 May 2024 (aged 77) Dar es Salaam, Tanzania
- Party: CCM
- Profession: Accountant (CPA, FCCA)

Mustafa Haidi Makunganya Mkulo (26 September 1946 – 3 May 2024) was a Tanzanian CCM politician who was Member of Parliament for the Kilosa constituency from 2005 to 2015.

Mkulo was a graduate of the University of London with an MBA degree and he had been the Minister of Finance up until 2012. He died on 3 May 2024, at the age of 77.
