= Kighoma Malima =

Tanzanian politician (1938–1995)

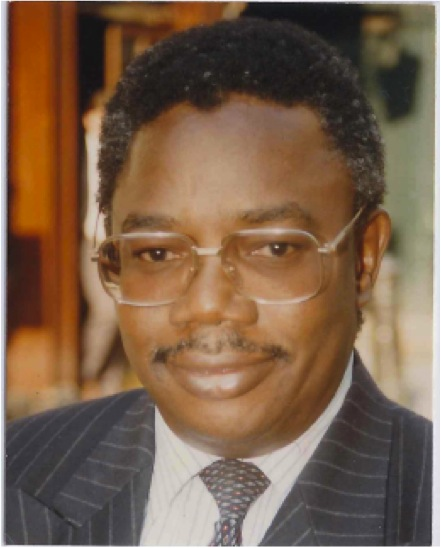

5th Minister of Finance
- In office 1994–1994
- President: Ali Hassan Mwinyi
- Preceded by: Steven Kibona
- Succeeded by: Jakaya Kikwete
- In office 1983–1985
- President: Julius Nyerere
- Preceded by: Amir H. Jamal
- Succeeded by: Cleopa Msuya

Personal details
- Born: 15 December 1938 Kisarawe, Tanganyika
- Died: 6 August 1995 (aged 56) London, United Kingdom
- Resting place: Mkuranga District, Tanzania
- Party: CCM
- Spouse: Mariam Fivawo Malima
- Children: Regina; Adam; Amaani; Akilimali; Fadhili; Asanterabi
- Education: Dartmouth College (BA); Yale University (MA); Princeton University (PhD)
- Profession: Economist

Kighoma Ali Malima (15 December 1938 – 6 August 1995) was a Tanzanian CCM politician.

== Early life and education ==
Kighoma Malima was born in Marui village Kisarawe District on 15 December 1938. He was named Abdallah, after his paternal grandfather who died in the World War I. He was born to Ali bin Abdallah Kighoma Malima and Habiba bint Suleiman wa Bura.

He attended primary and secondary school from 1948 to 1957 in Marui Primary School and then proceeded to Mzumbe Secondary School and Tabora Boys Secondary School. Malima cut short his studies in 1957 to join TANU and struggle for independence under the leadership of Julius Nyerere.

After independence Malima was appointed District Secretary in Masasi and Njombe. In June 1961 he attended a short course at Kivukoni Ideological College, Dar es Salaam before leaving for United States in 1962 for further studies at Dartmouth College, Hanover, New Hampshire where he obtained a BA in economics in 1965.

Kighoma Malima and Mariam Fivawo met in Boston, MA in 1965. Mariam/Venantia had just graduated from Regis College, Weston, MA and Kighoma Malima had graduated from Dartmouth College, NH. Few months later they got married and moved to New Haven were Kighoma Malima went to pursue his MA Economics at Yale University and graduated in 1966. He then proceeded to Princeton University and was awarded another MA in economics in 1970. He then became a lecturer at University of Dar es Salaam. Prof. Malima was the first Tanzanian to teach economics at University of Dar es Salaam. Soon after he began to work on his Ph.D. (International Trade and Economic Development) from Princeton University which he successfully defended in 1971.

== Personal ==
Malima and Mariam have six children. All of Malima's children gave him grandchildren. Some of them are known to be Ali Malima, Abdallah Malima, Amina Malima, Hawa Maswali, Hanifa Maswali, Adam Malima, and Annah Malima.
