= Alexandre Curi =

Brazilian politician (born 1979)

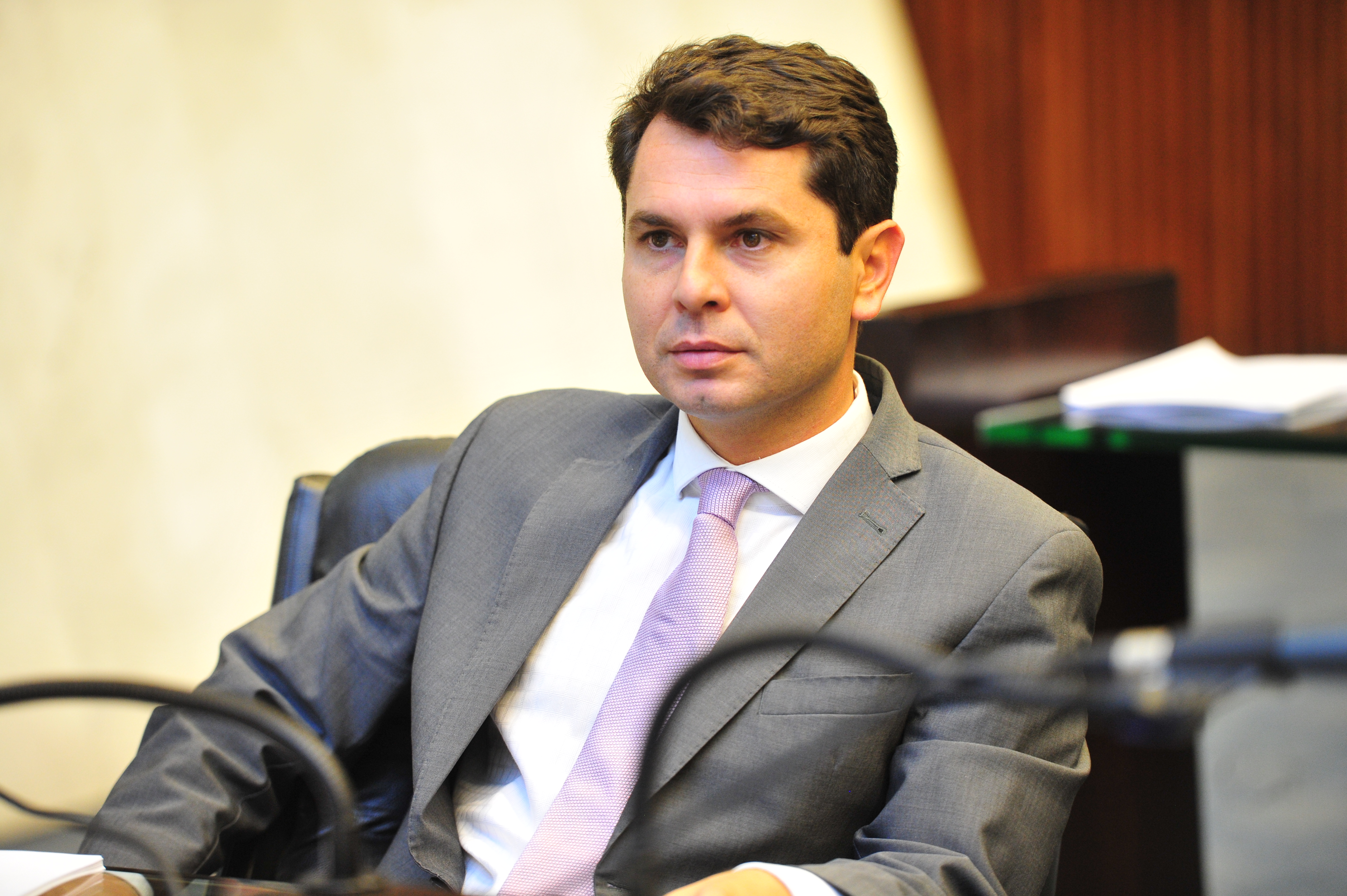
- Curi in 2017

President of the Legislative Assembly of Paraná
- Incumbent
- Assumed office 3 February 2025
- Preceded by: Ademar Traiano

Personal details
- Born: 9 April 1979 (age 47)
- Party: Social Democratic Party (since 2022)
- Relatives: Aníbal Khury (grandfather)

Alexandre Maranhão Khury (born 9 April 1979), better known as Alexandre Curi, is a Brazilian politician. He has been a member of the Legislative Assembly of Paraná since 2003, and has served as president of the assembly since 2025. From 2001 to 2003, he was a member of the Municipal Chamber of Curitiba. He is the grandson of Aníbal Khury.
