= Arilson Chiorato =

Brazilian politician (born 1978)

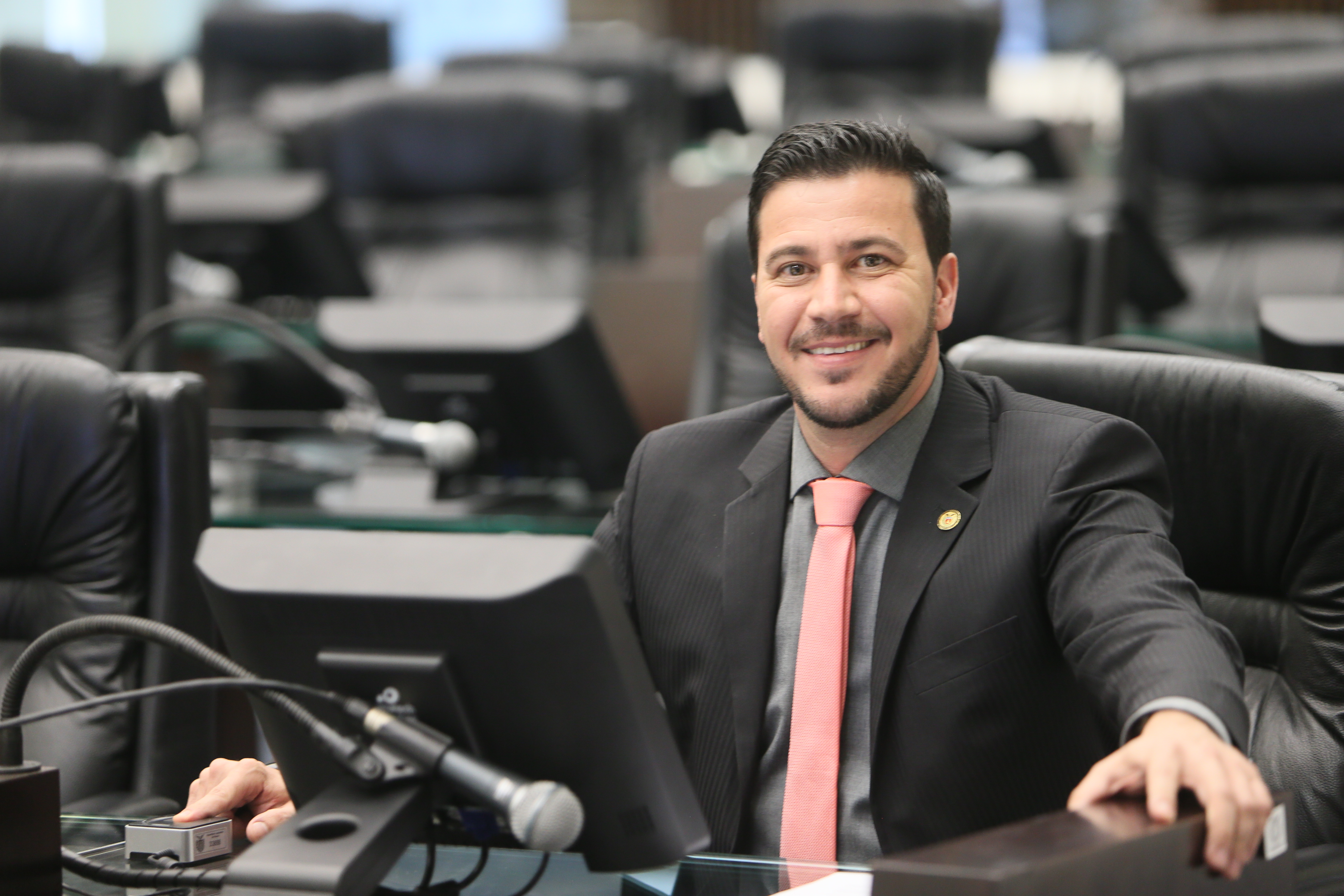
- Chiorato in 2019

Member of the Legislative Assembly of Paraná
- Incumbent
- Assumed office 1 February 2019

Personal details
- Born: 1 January 1978 (age 48)
- Party: Workers' Party (since 2001)

Arilson Maroldi Chiorato (born 1 January 1978) is a Brazilian politician serving as a member of the Legislative Assembly of Paraná since 2019. He has served as leader of the opposition since 2025, having previously served in 2022.
