= Ministry of Agriculture, Food Security and Cooperatives =

- Wizara ya Kilimo, Chakula na Ushirika (Swahili)

Ministry overview
- Dissolved: December 2015
- Superseding Ministry: Ministry of Agriculture, Livestock and Fisheries
- Jurisdiction: Government of Tanzania
- Headquarters: Dar es Salaam
- Website: Ministry Website

The Ministry of Agriculture, Food Security and Cooperatives was a ministry of the Government of Tanzania. Under the first Magufuli Cabinet it was merged into the Ministry of Agriculture, Livestock and Fisheries.

== Mission ==
The three main objectives PR mission of the Ministry of Agriculture, Food Security and Cooperatives of Tanzania is as follows:

1. Deliver quality agriculture and cooperative services.
2. Provide conducive environments to stake holders.
3. Build the capacity of local government authorities in order to facilitate and facilitate the private sector to contribute effectively for sustainable agricultural production and cooperative development.

== See also ==
- Agribusiness
- Sokoine University of Agriculture
