= William Mgimwa =

Tanzanian politician

13th Minister of Finance
- In office 7 May 2012 – 1 January 2014
- Preceded by: Mustafa Mkulo
- Succeeded by: Saada Salum

Member of Parliament for Kalenga constituency
- In office 28 November 2010 – 1 January 2014
- Preceded by: Stephen Galinoma
- Succeeded by: Godfrey Mgimwa

Personal details
- Born: 20 January 1950 Tanganyika
- Died: 1 January 2014 (aged 63) Pretoria, South Africa
- Resting place: Magunga, Kalenga, Iringa
- Party: CCM
- Spouse: Jane
- Children: Godfrey
- Education: IFM (AdvDip), (PGDip); Mzumbe University (MBA)

William Augustao Mgimwa (20 January 1950 – 1 January 2014) was a Tanzanian CCM politician and Member of Parliament for Kalenga constituency from 2010 to 2014. He also served as Tanzania's Minister of Finance from 2012 to 2014.

== Early life and career ==
He was educated at Mafinga Seminary and Tosamaganga Seminary schools. He thereafter joined The Institute of Finance Management and the Institute of Development Management (present day Mzumbe University) for his MBA in finance.

He had worked at the National Bank of Commerce as an accountant and was the principal of the Bank of Tanzania Training Institute in Mwanza from 2000 to 2010. He was elected by a landslide in 2010 as the member of parliament for Kalenga constituency, receiving 31,421 votes (84.39%). In May 2012, President Jakaya Kikwete appointed him as the Minister of Finance.

== Death ==
He died on 1 January 2014 at Kloof Medi-Clinic in Pretoria, South Africa where he was undergoing treatment. His body was repatriated to Dar es Salaam on 4 January and lay in repose at Karimjee Hall the next day. He was buried on Monday 6 January at his home village of Magunga in Iringa Region.

== Publications ==
- W. Mgimwa: Liquidity Management, Tanzania Bankers Journal, Dar es Salaam. 1994
- W. Mgimwa: Commercial Bank Lending Journal, Dar es Salaam. 1995
- W. Mgimwa: Advanced Credit Operations, Dar es Salaam. 2007
- W. Mgimwa: Advanced Treasury Management, Dar es Salaam.
