= Minister of Finance (Tanzania) =

- Waziri wa Fedha na Uchumi (Swahili)

- Incumbent; Mwigulu Nchemba since 2021
- Ministry of Finance and Economic Affairs
- Style: Honourable Minister
- Member of: Cabinet
- Seat: Dar es Salaam, Tanzania
- Appointer: President
- Term length: At the President's discretion
- Website: www.mof.go.tz

The Minister of Finance is the head of the Ministry of Finance and Economic Affairs of the Government of Tanzania.

== List of ministers ==
The following have served the ministry:

Parties

TANU CCM

#	Portrait	Minister	Took office	Left office	President
		Sir Ernest Vasey (1901-1984)	September 1961	January 1962	Julius Nyerere
		Paul Bomani (1925-2005)	January 1962	September 1965	Julius Nyerere
		Amir H. Jamal (1922-1995)	September 1965	February 1972	Julius Nyerere
		Cleopa Msuya (1931-2025)	February 1972	November 1975	Julius Nyerere
		Amir H. Jamal	November 1975	1977	Julius Nyerere
		Edwin Mtei (1932-2026)	1977	1979	Julius Nyerere
		Amir H. Jamal	1979	1983	Julius Nyerere
		Kighoma Malima	1983	1985	Julius Nyerere
		Cleopa Msuya	1986	1989	Ali Hassan Mwinyi
		Steven Kibona	1990	1993	Ali Hassan Mwinyi
		Kighoma Malima	1994		Ali Hassan Mwinyi
		Jakaya Kikwete	1994	1995	Ali Hassan Mwinyi
		Simon Mbilinyi	1995	1996	Benjamin Mkapa
		Daniel Yona	1997	2000	Benjamin Mkapa
		Basil Mramba	2001	21 December 2005	Benjamin Mkapa
		Zakia Meghji	6 January 2006	7 February 2008	Jakaya Kikwete
		Mustafa Mkulo	13 February 2008	4 May 2012	Jakaya Kikwete
		William Mgimwa	7 May 2012	1 January 2014	Jakaya Kikwete
		Saada Salum	20 January 2014	5 November 2015	Jakaya Kikwete
		Philip Mpango	2015	31 March 2021	John Magufuli
		Philip Mpango	2015	31 March 2021	Samia Suluhu
16		Mwigulu Nchemba	31 March 2021	13 November 2025	Samia Suluhu
