= Jakaya Kikwete =

President of Tanzania from 2005 to 2015

Jakaya Kikwete MEOPA
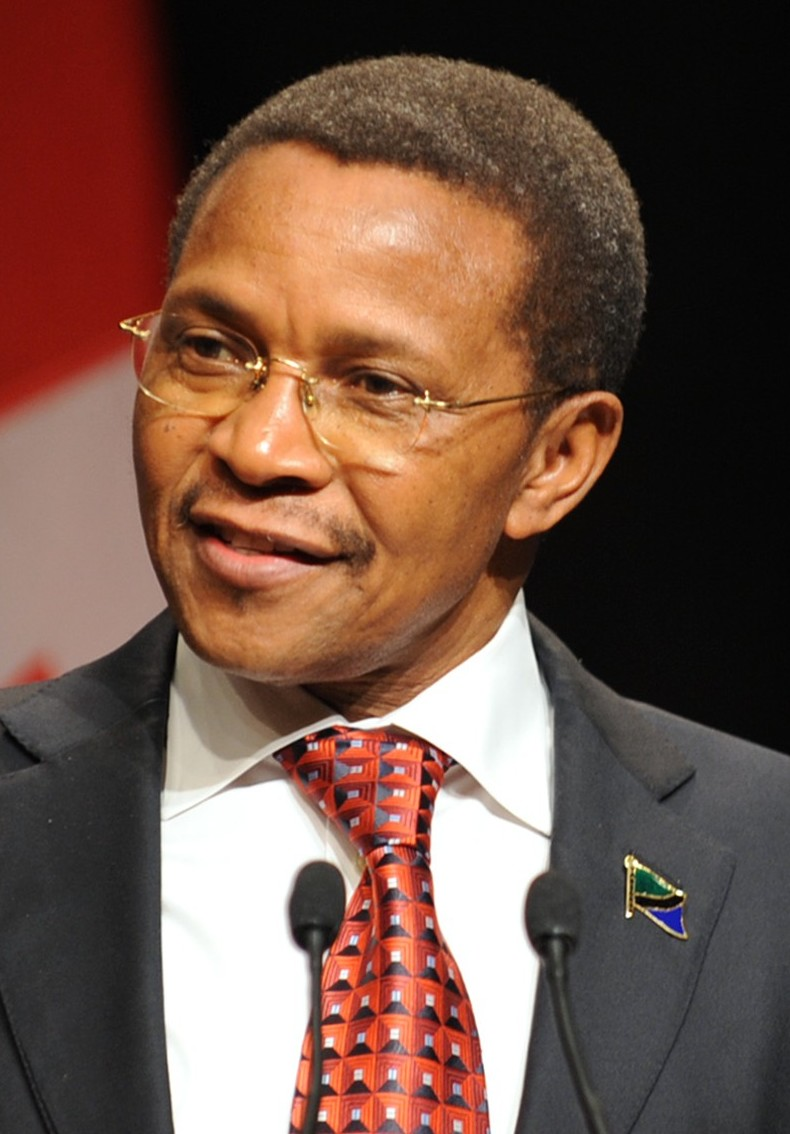
- Kikwete in January 2011

4th President of Tanzania
- In office 21 December 2005 – 5 November 2015
- Vice President: Ali Mohamed Shein; Mohamed Gharib Bilal
- Prime Minister: Frederick Sumaye; Edward Lowassa; Mizengo Pinda
- Preceded by: Benjamin Mkapa
- Succeeded by: John Magufuli

6th Chairperson of the African Union
- In office 31 January 2008 – 2 February 2009
- Preceded by: John Kufuor
- Succeeded by: Muammar Gaddafi

11th Minister of Foreign Affairs
- In office 27 November 1995 – 21 December 2005
- Preceded by: Joseph Rwegasira
- Succeeded by: Asha-Rose Migiro

7th Minister of Finance
- In office 7 August 1994 – 2 November 1995
- Preceded by: Kighoma Malima
- Succeeded by: Simon Mbilinyi

Member of Parliament for Chalinze
- In office 26 November 1995 – 20 January 2005
- Succeeded by: Ramadhani Maneno

Personal details
- Born: Jakaya Mrisho Kikwete; 7 October 1950 (age 75) Msoga, Tanganyika Territory
- Party: CCM (1977–present); TANU (before 1977)
- Spouse: Salma Kikwete (m. 1989)
- Children: 10
- Education: University of Dar es Salaam (BS)
- Profession: Economist
- Twitter handle: jmkikwete

Military service
- Allegiance: Tanzania
- Branch: Tanzanian Army
- Rank: Lieutenant Colonel
- Conflict: Uganda–Tanzania War

Jakaya Mrisho Kikwete (born 7 October 1950) is a Tanzanian politician who was the fourth president of Tanzania, in office from 2005 to 2015.

Prior to his election as president, he was the Minister for Foreign Affairs from 1995 to 2005 under his predecessor, Benjamin Mkapa. He also served as the chairperson of the African Union in 2008–2009 and the chairman of the Southern African Development Community Troika on Peace, Defence and Security in 2012–2013.

== Early life and education ==
Kikwete was born and raised in Msoga in the Chalinze District of Tanzania, in 1950. He is of Kwere heritage.

Between 1959 and 1963, Kikwete attended Karatu Primary School and Tengeru School from 1963 to 1965, both in Arusha Region. After Tengeru, Kikwete moved back to home to Pwani Region and attended Kibaha Secondary School for his O-levels, which took place between 1966 and 1969.

He then moved to Tanga Region, where he studied at the Tanga Technical Secondary School for his advanced level education. He graduated from the University of Dar es Salaam in 1975 with a degree in political science and public relations.

== Career ==
As a party cadre, Kikwete moved from one position to another in the party ranks and from one location to another in the service of the party. When TANU and Zanzibar's Afro-Shirazi Party (ASP) merged to form Chama Cha Mapinduzi (CCM) in 1977, Kikwete was moved to Zanzibar and assigned the task of setting up the new party's organisation and administration in the islands. In 1980, he was moved to the headquarters as administrator of the Dar es Salaam head office and head of the Defence and Security Department before moving again up-country to the regional and district party offices in Tabora Region (1981–84) and Singida Region and Nachingwea (1986–88) and Masasi District (1988) in the country's southern regions of Lindi and Mtwara respectively. In 1988, he was appointed to join the central government.

In 1994, at 44, he became one of the youngest finance ministers in the history of The United Republic of Tanzania. In December 1995, he became Minister of Foreign Affairs and International Cooperation, being appointed by President Benjamin William Mkapa of the third phase government. He held this post for ten years, until he was elected President of the United Republic of Tanzania in December 2005, hence becoming the country's longest serving foreign minister. During his tenure in the Ministry of Foreign Affairs, Tanzania played a significant role in bringing about peace in the Great Lakes region, particularly in The Democratic Republic Of Burundi and the Democratic Republic of Congo (DRC). Kikwete was also deeply involved in the process of rebuilding regional integration in East Africa. Specifically, several times, he was involved in a delicate process of establishing a customs union between the three countries of the East African Community (Kenya, Uganda, and Tanzania), where, for quite some time, he was a chairman of the East Africa Community's Council of Ministers.

Kikwete also participated in the initiation, and became a co-chair, of the Helsinki Process on Globalisation and Democracy. On 4 May 2005, Kikwete emerged victorious among 11 CCM members who had sought the party's nomination for presidential candidacy in the general election. After a 14 December 2005 multiparty general election, he was declared the winner by the Electoral Commission on 17 December and was sworn in as the fourth president of the United Republic of Tanzania on 21 December.

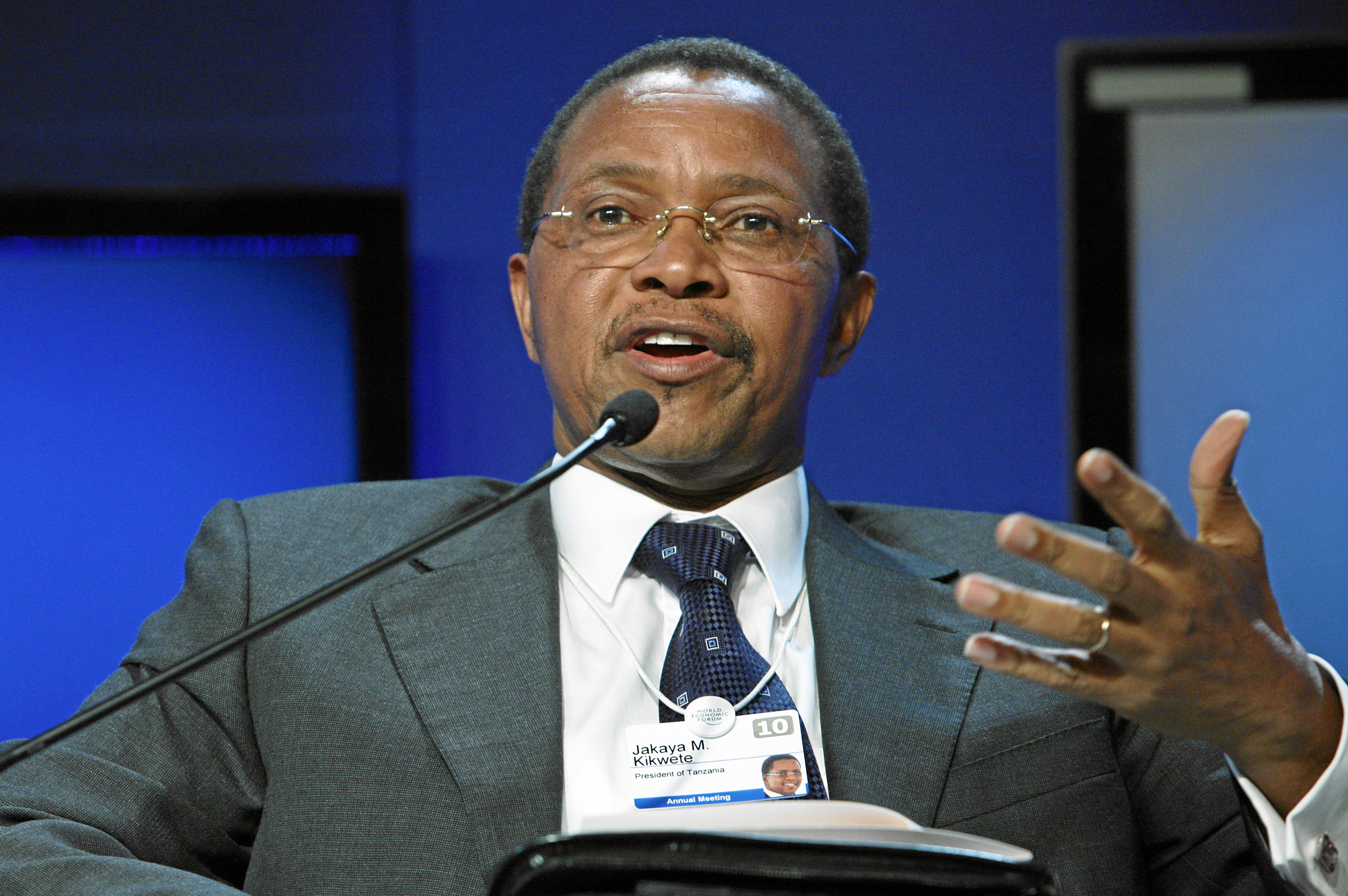
Kikwete during the WEF 2010

On 26 May 2013, Kikwete said at a meeting of the African Union that if President Joseph Kabila of the DRC could negotiate with the March 23 Movement, President Yoweri Museveni of Uganda and President Paul Kagame of Rwanda should be able to negotiate with the Allied Democratic Forces-National Army for the Liberation of Uganda and the Democratic Forces for the Liberation of Rwanda, respectively. In response, Museveni expressed his willingness to negotiate.

On 31 January 2016, the chairperson of the African Union Commission, Nkosazana Zuma, appointed Jakaya Kikwete the African Union High Representative in Libya. Following the crisis in Libya, Kikwete's role is to lead the AU's efforts on achieving peace and stability in Libya. Later that year, he was appointed by United Nations Secretary-General Ban Ki-moon to serve as member of the Lead Group of the Scaling Up Nutrition Movement. Since 2022, he has been a co-chairing the Commission for Universal Health convened by Chatham House, alongside Helen Clark.

== Personal life ==
Kikwete is an avid sports enthusiast and played basketball competitively in school. He has been a patron of the Tanzania Basketball Federation for the past 10 years. He is married to Salma and they have five children. He is a Muslim.

As of 4 April 2013, Kikwete was the sixth most followed African leader on Twitter with 57,626 followers.

== Honours and awards ==
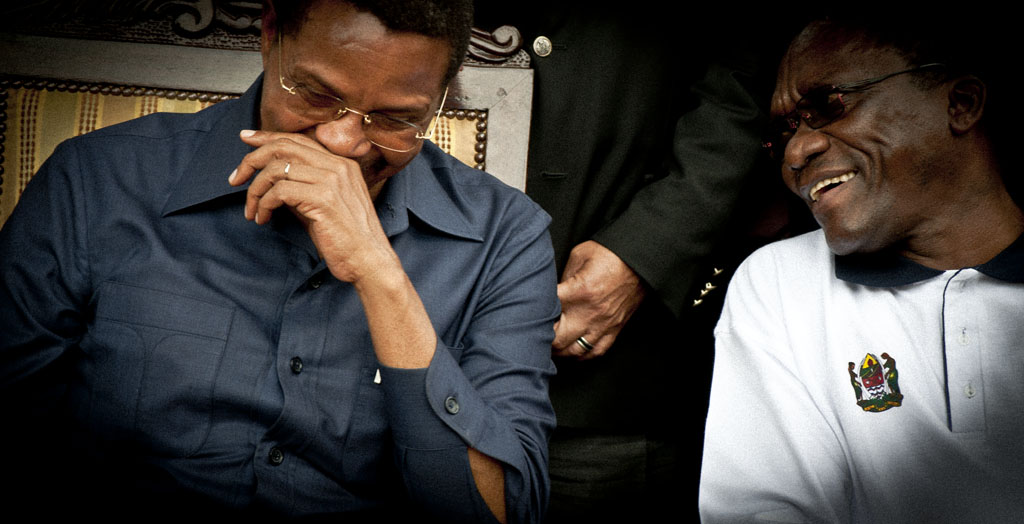
President Kikwete shares a light moment with Prime Minister Pinda

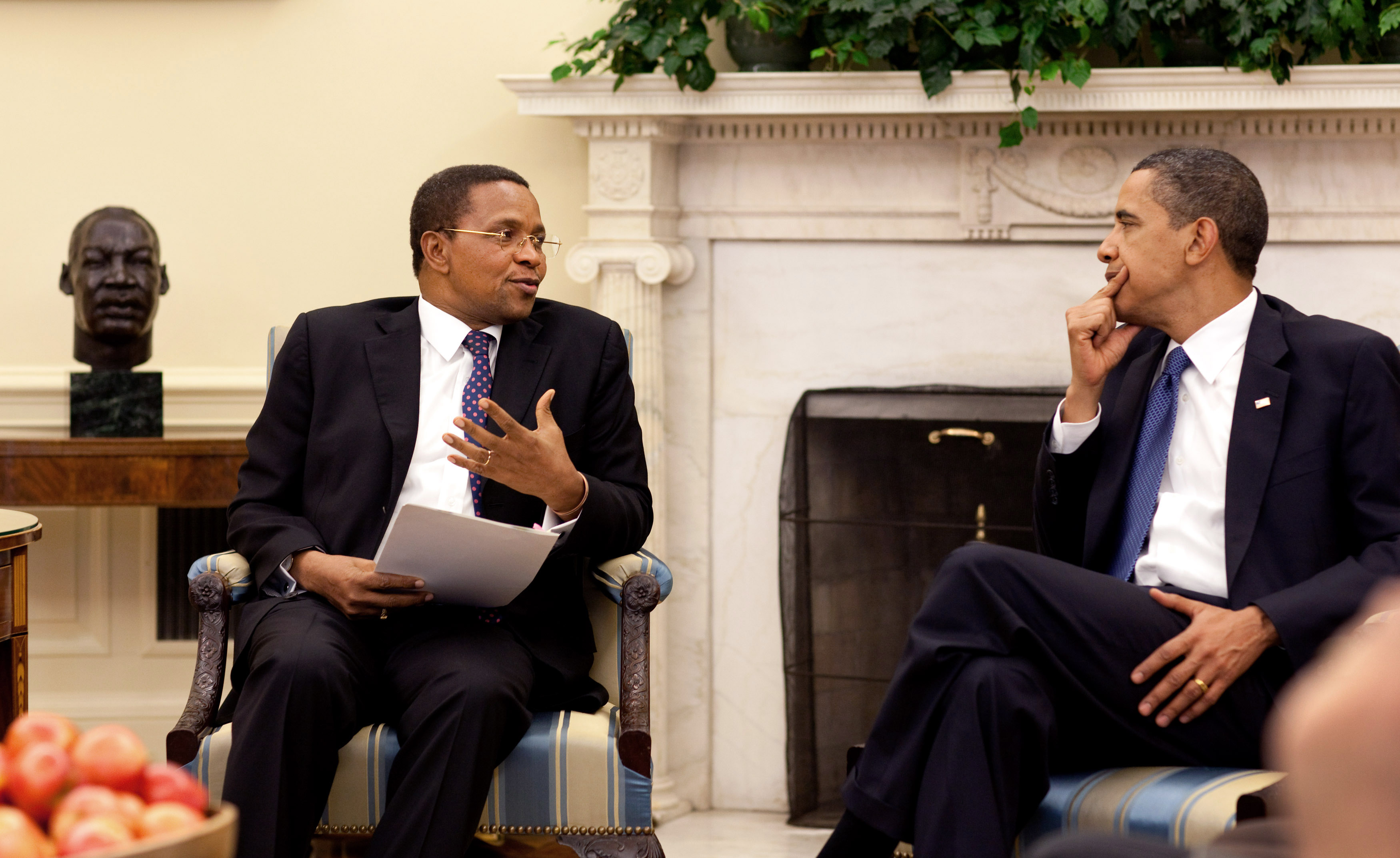
Kikwete was the first African Head of State to meet U.S. President Barack Obama (2009)

=== Honours ===
Year	Country	Order
2007	Uganda	Most Excellent Order of the Pearl of Africa (Grand Commander)
2009	Comoros	Order of the Green Crescent of the Comoros
2009	Saudi Arabia	Order of Abdulaziz Al Saud
2009	Jamaica	Order of Excellence
2012	Oman	Order of Oman (First Class)
2024	Tanzania	Order of Mwalimu Julius Kambarage Nyerere

=== Awards ===
- Sullivan Honor
- 2007: The AAI African National Achievement Award (on behalf of Tanzania).
- 2009: US Doctors for Africa Award.
- 2011: Social Good Award from the United Nations Foundation
- 2011: South-South Award for Global Health, Technology and Development
- 2012: FANRPAN Policy Leadership Award from the Food, Agriculture and Natural Resources Policy Analysis Network.
- 2013: Africa's Most Impactful Leader of the Year by the Africa Leadership Magazine
- 2013: ICCF Mengha Award by the International Conservation Caucus Foundation
- 2014: Icon of Democracy Award, from The Voice Magazine (Netherlands)
- 2015: Leadership Excellence Award by the Pan-African Youth Union.
- 2015: African Achievers Award by the Institute for Good Governance in Africa.
- 2015: African Statesman of the Year by The African Sun Times.

=== Honorary academic awards ===
Year	University	Country	Honour
2006	University of St. Thomas, Minnesota	United States	Doctor of Law
2008	Kenyatta University	Kenya	Doctor of Humane Letters
2010	Fatih University	Turkey	Doctorate in International Relations
2010	Muhimbili University	Tanzania	Doctor of Public Health
2010	University of Dodoma	Tanzania	Honoris Causa
2011	University of Dar es Salaam	Tanzania	Doctor of Law
2013	University of Guelph	Canada	Doctor of Law
2014	China Agricultural University	China	Honorary Professor
2014	Nelson Mandela–AIST	Tanzania	Honoris causa
2015	University of Newcastle, New South Wales	Australia	Doctor of Laws
2016	Open University of Tanzania	Tanzania	Honorary doctorate in leadership.

== Legacy ==
=== Eponyms ===
- Jakaya Kikwete Cardiac Institute (JKCI) in Dar es Salaam
- Jakaya Kikwete Convention Centre, Dodoma
- Jakaya M Kikwete Youth Park, a multi-sport facility in Dar es Salaam.
- Jakaya Mrisho Kikwete Foundation (JMKF), a registered trust and nonprofit organization
- Kikwete Bridge, across the Malagarasi River in western Tanzania (275 metres)
- Kikwete Hall, a reception hall at the Dar es Salaam State House that can accommodate 1,000 delegates.
- Roads:
  - Jakaya Kikwete Road in Dodoma
  - Jakaya Kikwete Road (0.49 km) in Nairobi, Kenya
- Schools:
  - Jakaya Kikwete Primary School in Muleba District, Kagera Region
  - Jakaya Kikwete Secondary School in Mbulu, Manyara Region
  - J. M. Kikwete Secondary School in Mbozi District, Mbeya Region

== See also ==
- List of heads of the executive by approval rating

Political offices
Preceded by Steven Kabona	Minister of Finance; 1994–1995	Succeeded by Simon Mbilinyi
Preceded by Joseph Rwegasira	Minister of Foreign Affairs; 1995–2005	Succeeded by Asha-Rose Migiro
Preceded by Benjamin Mkapa	President of Tanzania; 2005–2015	Succeeded by John Magufuli
Party political offices
Preceded by Benjamin Mkapa	National Chairman of the Chama Cha Mapinduzi; 2007–present	Incumbent
Diplomatic posts
Preceded by John Kufuor	Chairperson of the African Union; 2008–2009	Succeeded by Muammar al-Gaddafi
