= 2021 in Tanzania =

- Decades: 2000s; 2010s; 2020s
- See also: Other events of 2021; Timeline of Tanzanian history

Events of 2021 in Tanzania.

== Incumbents ==
- President
  - John Magufuli, died 17 March
  - Samia Suluhu, starting 17 March
- Vice-President:
  - Samia Suluhu, until 17 March
- Vice-President: Philip Mpango
- Prime Minister: Kassim Majaliwa
- Chief Justice: Ibrahim Hamis Juma

== Events ==
Ongoing – COVID-19 pandemic in Tanzania

=== January to March ===
- 16 January – The French Embassy announces it is working with the Association of the Tanzanian Diaspora Living in France to promote the Kiswahili language.
- 19 January – The United States puts visa restrictions on unnamed Tanzanian officials because of responsibility or complicity in irregularities and violence in the 2020 Tanzanian general election.
- 25 January – A man is arrested in Austria trying to smuggle seventy-four protected chameleons from Tanzania. Three died, but the rest were taken to the Schönbrunn Zoo.
- 27 January – President John Magufuli expresses doubts about the COVID-19 vaccines on January 27 during a speech in Chato, Geita Region.
- 23 February – Maskless Finance Minister Philip Mpango coughs his way through a press conference to announce he is not dead a few days after President Magufuli acknowledged COVID-19 in real.
- 10 March – Opposition leader Tundu Lissu demands answers about the health and whereabouts of President John Magufuli, 61, who has not been seen in public since 27 February.
- 15 March – Four people are arrested for spreading rumors that President Magufuli is ill, despite his not being seen in public in four weeks.
- 17 March – President John Magufuli dies; Vice-President Samia Suluhu takes over.
- 21 March – 45 people are killed in a stampede at Uhuru Stadium in Dar es Salaam.
- 28 March – President Samia Suluhu Hassan orders the suspension of the head of the ports authority over corruption allegations.
- 30 March – President Hassan picks Philip Mpango, the finance minister, to be her deputy.
- 25 August – A gunman shoots and kills three police officers and a security guard in Dar es Salaam.

== Deaths ==
- 17 January – Ilunga 'CPwaa' Khalifa, 38, rapper; pneumonia.
- 20 January – Julius Sang′udi, deputy commissioner of prisons.
- 21 January – Martha Umbulla, 65, politician.
- 21 January – Prudence Karugendo, writer and political analyst.
- 22 January – Emanuel Maganga, former Kigoma Region commissioner.
- 23 January – Ireneus Kaganda Mbahulira, 78, bishop.
- 25 January – Gregory Teu, 69, former deputy minister.
- 12 February – Atashasta Justus Nditiye, 51, former deputy minister; complications after traffic accident.
- 12 February – Harith Bakari Mwapachu, 81, former minister.
- 13 February – Regina Rweyemamu, former High Court judge.
- 15 February – Muhammed Seif Khatib, 70, former minister and owner of Zenji FM.
- 17 February – Seif Sharif Hamad, 77, First Vice President of Zanzibar and ACT chairman; COVID-19.
- 17 February – John Kijazi, 64, chief secretary to the President, chancellor of University of Dodoma; heart attack.
- 20 February – Servacius Likwelile, 63, former Permanent Secretary in the Ministry of Finance.
- 22 February – Benno Ndulu, 71, former governor of the Bank of Tanzania.
- 25 February – Arthur Shoo, Secretary-General, Northern Diocese, Evangelical Lutheran Church in Tanzania.
- 17 March – John Magufuli, 61, President; heart complications.
- 6 April – Alfred Maluma, 65, Catholic bishop of Njombe; traffic accident.
- 28 April – Moses Beatus Mlula, defence adviser at the High Commission of Tanzania in New Delhi; COVID-19.
- 18 May – Tumainiel Kiwelu, 79, former commander and chief of staff in the Tanzania People's Defence Force during the Uganda–Tanzania War.
- 29 June – Patrick Mfugale, 70 or 71, CEO of Tanzania Roads Agency.
- 22 July – Anna Mghwira, 62, former regional commissioner of Kilimanjaro Region.
- 30 July – Ambilikile Mwasapile, also known as Babu wa Loliondo, former Lutheran priest turned discoverer of miracle potion.
- 2 August – Elias John Kwandikwa, 55, Minister for Defence and National Service.
- 17 August – Basil Mramba, 81, former finance minister; COVID-19.
- 27 September – William Olenasha, 49, politician.
- 18 November – 'Nick' Al Noor Kassum Sunderji, 97, former politician and university chancellor.
- 18 December – 'Baharia' Issa, 64, politician.

== See also ==
- 2021–22 South-West Indian Ocean cyclone season
- COVID-19 pandemic in Africa
- Common Market for Eastern and Southern Africa
- East African Community
- International Conference on the Great Lakes Region
