= 2017 in Tanzania =

- Decades: 1990s; 2000s; 2010s; 2020s
- See also: Other events of 2017; Timeline of Tanzanian history

Events in the year 2017 in Tanzania.

== Incumbents ==
- President: John Magufuli
- Vice-President: Samia Suluhu
- Prime Minister: Kassim Majaliwa
- Chief Justice: Mohamed Chande Othman (until 18 January), Ibrahim Hamis Juma (starting 18 January)

== Events ==
- 12 April – Tanzanian hip-hop artist Roma Mkatoliki (Ibrahim Mussa) and three fellow artists were abducted by unknown assailants at a recording studio in Dar es Salaam. They were later found injured and reported that they had been tortured during their abduction.
- 25 April – Tanzania expelled UNDP head Awa Dobo, possibly because of alleged criticisms of a controversial election in Zanzibar.
- 6 May – More than 30 people, almost all of whom were schoolchildren, were killed in a bus crash near the town of Karatu.
- 17 July – A Charismatic pastor was arrested after two worshippers drowned while being baptised by him in the Ungwasi river. The victims were overwhelmed by the river's current.
- 7 September – Tundu Lissu, an MP of the opposition party Chadema, survived being shot multiple times at his home after returning from a parliamentary session by unknown gunmen.
- 8 November – At least 6 schoolchildren were killed and 25 others were injured in an explosion, likely caused by a grenade, in the Kagera Region.
- 21 November – Disappearance of Azory Gwanda, a journalist for Mwananchi Communications Ltd in Dar es Salaam.
- 9 December – On Tanzania's 56th independence anniversary, President Magufuli pardoned 1828 convicts, including musician "Nguza Viking" and his son, who were arrested in 2003 for raping 10 primary school girls. The two were met by cheering crowds upon their release, local media claimed.

== Deaths ==
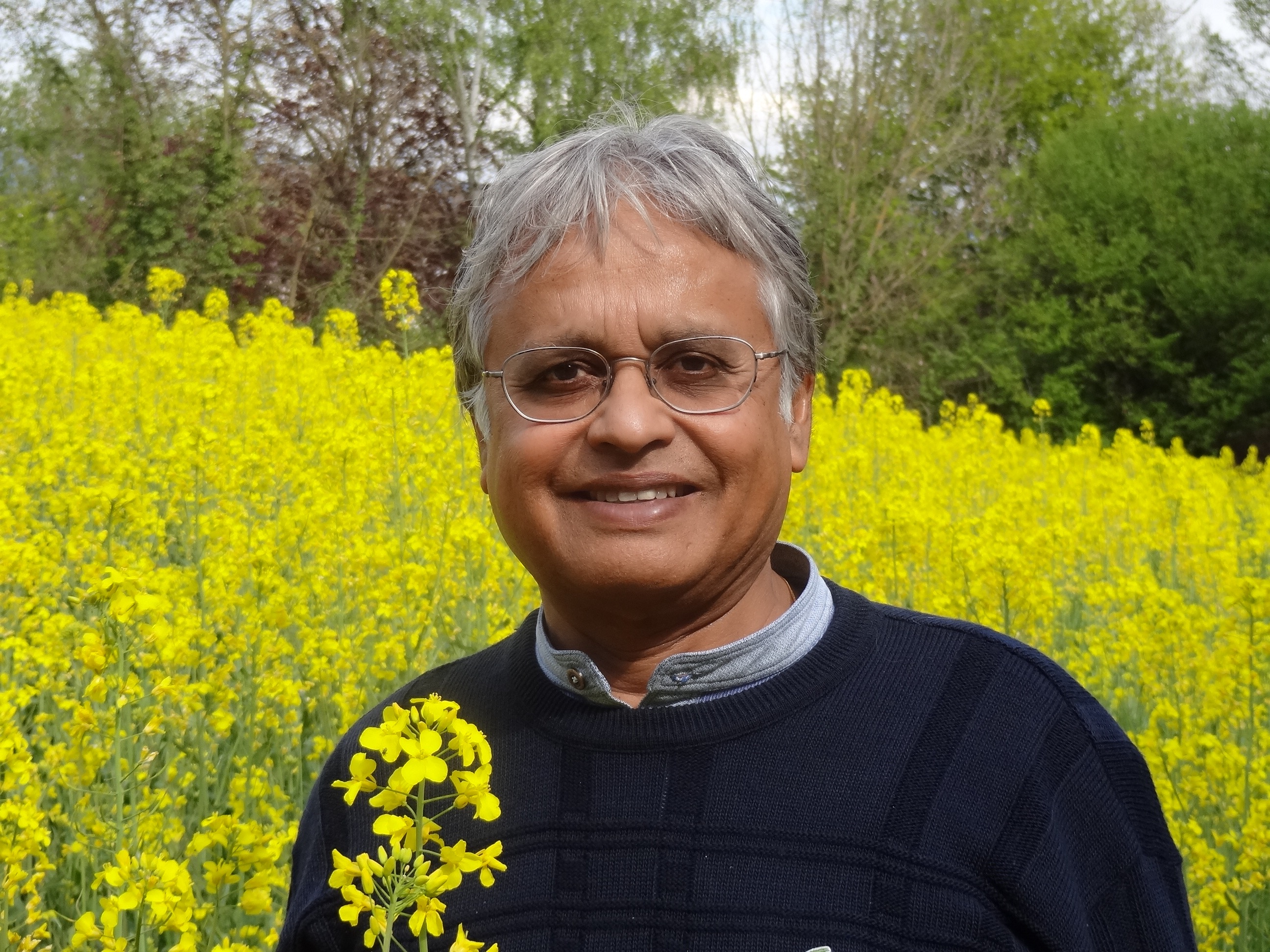
Vinod Chohan

- 4 January – Anna Senkoro, politician and medical doctor (b. 1962).
- 12 June – Vinod Chohan, scientist (b. 1949)
