= 2023 in Tanzania =

- Decades: 2000s; 2010s; 2020s
- See also: Other events of 2023; Timeline of Tanzanian history

Events of 2023 in Tanzania.

== Incumbents ==
- President
  - Samia Suluhu
- Vice-President:
  - Philip Mpango
- Prime Minister: Kassim Majaliwa
- Chief Justice: Ibrahim Hamis Juma

== Events ==
Ongoing – COVID-19 pandemic in Tanzania; 2022 Africa floods

=== January ===
- 3 January – President Suluhu Hassan announces the end of a six-year ban on political rallies and meetings outside election periods.
- 21 January – Tanzanian opposition party Chadema organizes a political demonstration in Mwanza.
- 26 January – Opposition leader Tundu Lissu returns to Tanzania after five years in exile.

=== March ===
- 12 March – Eight miners are killed in Geita Region, when their pit is flooded with rainwater.
- 21 March – Tanzania reports that five people have died from an outbreak of Marburg virus. The Health Ministry added that three others are being treated and that 161 people are being tracked by authorities, although the ministry stated that this is not of serious concern for the country.

=== April ===
- 1 April – Construction of the Kakono Hydroelectric Power Station (87.8 MW) begins across the Kagera River in Kagera Region.
- 14 April – Tanzanian members of parliament call on the government to tighten laws against homosexual relations with the death penalty.

=== June ===
- 8 June – The National Assembly approves reforms transferring oversight of Tanzania Intelligence and Security Services to the president and TISS director general.
- 10 June – Tanzania’s parliament approves a controversial port management deal with Dubai-based DP World, triggering protests and opposition from civil society.
- 30 June – Government lifts ban on night-time upcountry bus travel. The ban was imposed in the 1990s following a rise in road accidents and hijacking of buses.

=== August ===
- 15 August – Security forces arrest 39 Ngorongoro community members after a village meeting.

=== September ===
- 4–8 September – The Africa Food Systems Forum 2023 Summit is held, in Dar es Salaam, on sustainable agriculture and food security.
- 10 September – Police arrest and release Tundu Lissu hours before a planned political rally on charges of unlawful assembly.

=== October ===
- 22 October – Tanzania’s government officially signs a port management deal with DP World in the presence of President Samia Suluhu Hassan.
- 26 October – Heavy rains and strong winds in Kalambo District demolish 30 houses and leave over 150 people homeless, with victims taking refuge in schools and relatives’ homes.
- 29 October – Israel’s Foreign Affairs Ministry confirms that two Tanzanian nationals, Joshua Loitu Mollel and Clemence Felix Mtenga, are among the hostages held by Hamas following the 7 October attack on Israel.

=== December ===
- 14 December – Tanzanian Foreign Minister January Makamba confirmed that a 21-year-old Tanzanian student, Joshua Loitu Mollel, was "killed immediately after being captured by Hamas" on October 7.

Hamas filmed Mollel's murder and the abuse of his body before being taken to Gaza and held there as a bargaining chip.

== Deaths ==
- 14 May – Erasto B. Mpemba, 73, Game warden and co-discoverer of that hot liquids freeze faster than cold ones; the Mpemba effect.

== See also ==
- 2022–23 South-West Indian Ocean cyclone season
- COVID-19 pandemic in Africa
- Common Market for Eastern and Southern Africa
- East African Community
- International Conference on the Great Lakes Region
