= 2015 in Tanzania =

- Decades: 1990s; 2000s; 2010s; 2020s
- See also: Other events of 2015; Timeline of Tanzanian history

The following lists events that will happen during 2015 in Tanzania.

== Incumbents ==
- President: Jakaya Kikwete (until 5 November), John Magufuli (starting 5 November)
- Vice-President: Mohamed Gharib Bilal (until 5 November), Samia Suluhu (starting 5 November)
- Prime Minister: Mizengo Pinda (until 5 November), Kassim Majaliwa (starting 20 November)
- Chief Justice: Mohamed Chande Othman

== Events ==
=== March ===
- 5 March – Flooding kills 42 people near Lake Victoria in the Kahama District.

=== October ===
- 25 October – A general election is to be held.

== Deaths ==
- 13 February – Magnus Mwalunyungu, 84, Roman Catholic bishop
- 2 June – Eugen Mwaiposa, 54, politician
- 21 July – Mariam Mfaki, 69, politician
- 24 September – Celina Kombani, 56, politician
- 12 October – Abdallah Kigoda, 61, politician and minister of energy and minerals
- 15 October – Deo Filikunjombe, 43, politician
