= 2022 in Tanzania =

- Decades: 2000s; 2010s; 2020s
- See also: Other events of 2022; Timeline of Tanzanian history

Events of 2022 in Tanzania.

== Incumbents ==
- President
  - Samia Suluhu
- Vice-President:
  - Philip Mpango
- Prime Minister: Kassim Majaliwa
- Chief Justice: Ibrahim Hamis Juma

== Events ==
Ongoing – COVID-19 pandemic in Tanzania; 2022 Africa floods

- 1 February – The Tanzanite Bridge is officially opened
- 19 March – Twenty-two people are killed and 38 more injured during a bus–truck collision in Melela Kibaoni, Morogoro Region, Tanzania.
- 24 March – The World Health Organization announces that a polio vaccination campaign will begin in Malawi, Mozambique, Tanzania, and Zambia.
- 5 October – Lawyers for Maasai herders, who say the Tanzanian government is trying to violently evict them from their ancestral land to make way for a luxury game reserve, have lodged an appeal against a court ruling that dismissed their case.
- 23 October – A fire, spread by strong winds, occurs on the slopes of Tanzania's Mount Kilimanjaro.
- 6 November – Precision Air Flight 494 crashes in Lake Victoria while attempting to land at Bukoba Airport, killing 19 people.

== Sports ==
- 2021–22 Tanzanian Premier League
- Tanzania at the 2022 Commonwealth Games

== Deaths ==
- 10 February – Mwele Ntuli Malecela, 58, civil servant
- 5 August – Li Jinglan, Chinese-Tanzanian interpreter
- 23 December – Sir Ashok Jivraj Rabheru, 70, Tanzanian-born British businessman

== See also ==
- 2022–23 South-West Indian Ocean cyclone season
- COVID-19 pandemic in Africa
- Common Market for Eastern and Southern Africa
- East African Community
- International Conference on the Great Lakes Region
