= 2018 in Tanzania =

- Decades: 1990s; 2000s; 2010s; 2020s
- See also: Other events of 2018; Timeline of Tanzanian history

Events in the year 2018 in Tanzania.

== Incumbents ==
- President: John Magufuli
- Vice-President: Samia Suluhu
- Prime Minister: Kassim Majaliwa
- Chief Justice: Ibrahim Hamis Juma

== Events ==
- 20 September – Sinking of MV Nyerere, 228 deaths

== Deaths ==
- 23 January – Robert Kisanga, judge (b. 1933).
- 6 March – Amani W. A. Kabourou, politician (b. 1949)
