= 2025 in Tanzania =

- Decades: 2000s; 2010s; 2020s
- See also: Other events of 2025; Timeline of Tanzanian history

Events of 2025 in Tanzania.

== Incumbents ==
- President: Samia Suluhu
- Vice-President: Philip Mpango
- Prime Minister: Kassim Majaliwa (until 13 November); Mwigulu Nchemba (since 13 November)
- Chief Justice: Ibrahim Hamis Juma

== Events ==
=== January ===
- 14 January – An outbreak of Marburg virus is reported in the Kagera Region, leaving at least eight people dead.
- 22 January – Tundu Lissu is elected as leader of the opposition party Chadema, ousting Freeman Mbowe, who led the party for over 20 years.

=== March ===
- 13 March – Tanzania announces the withdrawal of its military contingent from the Southern African Development Community peacekeeping mission to the eastern Democratic Republic of the Congo.

=== April ===
- 9 April – Tundu Lissu is arrested on charges of incitement and treason after calling for electoral reforms at a rally in Mbinga.
- 13 April – The National Electoral Commission disqualifies Chadema from competing in the 2025 Tanzanian general election, saying that it had failed to sign a code of conduct document that was due on 12 April.

=== May ===
- 18 May – Kenyan politician Martha Karua is arrested and deported upon arrival at Julius Nyerere International Airport in Dar es Salaam to represent Tundu Lissu in court.
- 20 May – A series of cyberattacks are conducted on social media accounts of government agencies including the Tanzania Police Force, resulting in a nationwide blockage for X.

=== June ===
- 3 June – Authorities close down the Glory of Christ church in Dar es Salaam, following remarks from its leader, MP Josephat Gwajima criticising human rights abuses by the government.
- 28 June – Two buses collide and catch fire in Sabasaba, Kilimanjaro Region, killing 38 people and injuring 28 others.

=== July ===
- 3 July – Prime Minister Kassim Majaliwa announces he will not seek re-election in the upcoming October parliamentary elections.

=== September ===
- 15 September – Alphonce Simbu becomes the first Tanzanian to win a gold medal in a world marathon championship after finishing first in the World Championships Marathon in Japan.
- 24 September – A Tanzania-flagged vessel carrying 2,500 tons of cement partially submerges south of Kish Island, Iran. All nine crew members are rescued.

=== October ===
- 22 October – Police detain Chadema deputy chair John Heche outside a Dar es Salaam court during Tundu Lissu’s trial.
- 29 October –
  - 2025 Tanzanian general election: Incumbent president Samia Suluhu Hassan is reelected with 98% of the vote, according to official results.
  - Violent protests break out over the disqualification of opposition candidates during the general election; police then impose a curfew in Dar es Salaam that is lifted on 4 November.

=== November ===
- 3 November – Samia Suluhu Hassan is inaugurated for a second term as president.
- 8 November – Police arrest Chadema deputy secretary general Amani Golugwa and issue warrants for nine others over post-election protests; 145 people are charged with treason.
- 13 November – President Suluhu nominates Mwigulu Nchemba as prime minister.
- 14 November – In her first post-election parliamentary address, President Suluhu establishes an inquiry commission to investigate killings during the October election protests.
- 17 November – President Suluhu appoints Khamis Mussa Omar as finance minister as part of a cabinet reshuffle that results in the replacement of seven officials.

=== December ===
- 16 December – US President Donald Trump issues a proclamation imposing partial travel restrictions on Tanzanian nationals travelling to the United States.
- 24 December – A helicopter crashes near Barafu Camp on Mount Kilimanjaro during a medical rescue mission, killing five people.

== Holidays ==
- 1 January – New Year's Day
- 12 January – Zanzibar Revolution
- 30 March – Eid al-Fitr
- 7 April – Karume Day
- 18 April – Good Friday
- 20 April – Easter
- 21 April – Easter Monday
- 26 April – Union Day
- 1 May – Labour Day
- 6 June – Eid al-Adha
- 7 July – Saba Saba Day
- 8 August – Nane Nane Day
- 4 September – Prophet Muhammad's Birthday
- 14 October – Nyerere Day
- 9 December – Tanzania Independence Day
- 25 December – Christmas Day
- 26 December – Boxing Day

== Deaths ==
- 7 May – Cleopa Msuya, 94, prime minister (1980–1983, 1994–1995) and first vice president (1990–1995)
- 11 December – Jenista Mhagama, 58, MNA (since 2015)
