= 2020 in Tanzania =

- Decades: 2000s; 2010s; 2020s
- See also: Other events of 2020; Timeline of Tanzanian history

Events of 2020 in Tanzania.

== Incumbents ==
- President: John Magufuli
- Vice-President: Samia Suluhu
- Prime Minister: Kassim Majaliwa
- Chief Justice: Ibrahim Hamis Juma

== Events ==
=== January ===
- 31 January – U.S. President Donald Trump restricts certain types of visa for Tanzanian citizens.

=== February ===
- 2 February – At least 40 people are killed in a stampede at a church in Moshi, Tanzania.

=== May ===
- 3 May – COVID-19 pandemic: Tanzanian President John Magufuli questions coronavirus tests after samples from a goat, a pawpaw, and a sheep tested positive. Tanzania reports 480 cases of COVID-19 and 17 deaths.

=== October ===
- October 28 – 2020 Tanzanian general election: Incumbent John Magufuli is re-elected.

=== November ===
- 13 November – President Magufuli re-appoints Philip Mpango as finance minister.

=== December ===
- 6 December – The Alliance for Change and Transparency-Wazalendo party of Zanzibar announces it will join a national unity government with Chama Cha Mapinduzi party.

== Deaths ==
=== February ===
- 13 February – Iddi Simba, former Minister of Industry and Trade.

=== April ===
- 12 April – Josephat Torner, albino activist (b. 1977 or 1978).
- 20 April – Gertrude Rwakatare, pastor, politician and MP (b. 1950).
- 25 April – Abdulkarim Shah, former politician and MP (b. 1961).
- 28 April – Augustino Ramadhani, politician and former Chief Justice of Tanzania (b. 1945).
- 29 April – Richard Ndassa, politician and MP (b. 1959).

=== May ===
- 1 May – Augustine Mahiga, diplomat and politician, former Minister of Foreign Affairs and Permanent Representative to the UN (b. 1945).

=== July ===
- 24 July – Benjamin Mkapa, politician and the third President of Tanzania (b. 1938).

=== September ===
- September 10 – Mark Bomani, 88, jurist, Attorney General (1965–1976).
- 14 September – Salim Turky, 57, businessman and MP.

=== November ===
- 5 November – Cyril Chami, 56, former MP and Minister for Industry, Trade and Marketing.

=== December ===
- 21 December – Anthony Banzi, 74, Roman Catholic prelate, Bishop of Tanga (since 1994).

== See also ==
- 2020–21 South-West Indian Ocean cyclone season
- COVID-19 pandemic in Tanzania
- COVID-19 pandemic in Africa
- 2020 in East Africa
- 2020 in Kenya
- 2020 in Mozambique
- 2020 in Zambia
