= 2024 in Tanzania =

- Decades: 2000s; 2010s; 2020s
- See also: Other events of 2024; Timeline of Tanzanian history

Events of 2024 in Tanzania.

== Incumbents ==
- President: Samia Suluhu
- Vice-President: Philip Mpango
- Prime Minister: Kassim Majaliwa
- Chief Justice: Ibrahim Hamis Juma

== Events ==
=== January ===
- 13 January – At least 21 miners are killed and several others are trapped following a collapse at a gold mine in Simiyu Region.

=== March ===
- 10 March – Eight children and one adult on Zanzibar die from chelonitoxism after consuming sea turtle meat, a local delicacy. Another 78 people are hospitalized.

=== April ===
- 25 April – Floods and landslides kill at least 155 people nationwide.

=== May ===
- 23 May – Eleven people are killed in an explosion at a sugar factory in Morogoro Region.

=== August ===
- 12 August – Freeman Mbowe and his deputy Tundu Lissu, who serve as the leaders of the opposition Chadema party, are arrested on the eve of a scheduled rally in Mbeya along with 467 other party members. They are released on bail the next day.

=== September ===
- 7 September – Ali Mohamed Kibao, a member of the Chadema secretariat, is found murdered a day after being abducted from a bus travelling from Dar-es-Salaam to Tanga.
- 23 September – Eight senior leaders of Chadema, including Freeman Mbowe and Tundu Lissu, are arrested amid calls by the party for protests.
- 30 September – A court in Dodoma sentences four people, including a soldier and a police officer, to life imprisonment for the gang-rape of a 17-year old girl in August that was published on video.

=== October ===
- 2 October – The Tanzania Communications Regulatory Authority imposes a 30-day suspension on the online platforms of Mwananchi Communications for publishing material it claims harmed the country's image.

=== November ===
- 16 November –Twenty-nine people are killed in the collapse of a four-story building in Kariakoo, Dar es Salaam.
- 27 November – 2024 Tanzanian local elections.

== Deaths ==
- 13 February – Ibrahim Saidi Rashidi Msabaha, 72, politician.
- 29 February – Ali Hassan Mwinyi, 98, politician and the second President of Tanzania.

== Holidays ==
- 1 January – New Year's Day
- 12 January – Zanzibar Revolution
- 29 March – Good Friday
- 31 March – Easter
- 1 April – Easter Monday
- 7 April – Karume Day
- 10 April – Eid al-Fitr
- 26 April – Union Day
- 1 May – Labour Day
- 16 June – Eid al-Adha
- 7 July – Saba Saba Day
- 8 August – Nane Nane Day
- 16 September – Prophet Muhammad's Birthday
- 14 October – Nyerere Day
- 9 December – Tanzania Independence Day
- 25 December – Christmas Day
- 26 December – Boxing Day
