= 2014 in Tanzania =

- Decades: 1990s; 2000s; 2010s; 2020s
- See also: Other events of 2014; Timeline of Tanzanian history

Events from the year 2012 in Tanzania.

== Incumbents ==
- President: Jakaya Kikwete
- Vice-President: Mohamed Gharib Bilal
- Prime Minister: Mizengo Pinda
- Chief Justice: Mohamed Chande Othman

== Events ==
=== May ===
- 5 May – Alliance for Change and Transparency, a social democratic political party, received its permanent registration.

=== November ===
- 27 November – Several politicians, including the prime minister Mizengo Pinda, Housing Minister Anna Tibaijuka and Attorney General Frederick Werema, were exposed to be involved in the Tegeta Escrow Scandal. Tibaijuka and Werema later left their positions due to the scandal.

== Deaths ==
- 28 March – Godfrey Mdimi Mhogolo, bishop of Anglican Diocese of Central Tanganyika (born 1951)
