= 2016 in Tanzania =

- Decades: 1990s; 2000s; 2010s; 2020s
- See also: Other events of 2016; Timeline of Tanzanian history

Events in the year 2016 in Tanzania.

== Incumbents ==
- President: John Magufuli
- Vice-President: Samia Suluhu
- Prime Minister: Kassim Majaliwa
- Chief Justice: Mohamed Chande Othman

== Events ==
- 8 July – Marrying girls under 18 was outlawed. Prior to this, girls of age 14 and above could marry with parental consent.
- 10 September – A magnitude 5.9 earthquake killed 19 people and injured 253 in Tanzania.

=== Sport ===
- 5–21 August – Tanzania at the 2016 Summer Olympics: 7 competitors in 3 sports

== Deaths ==
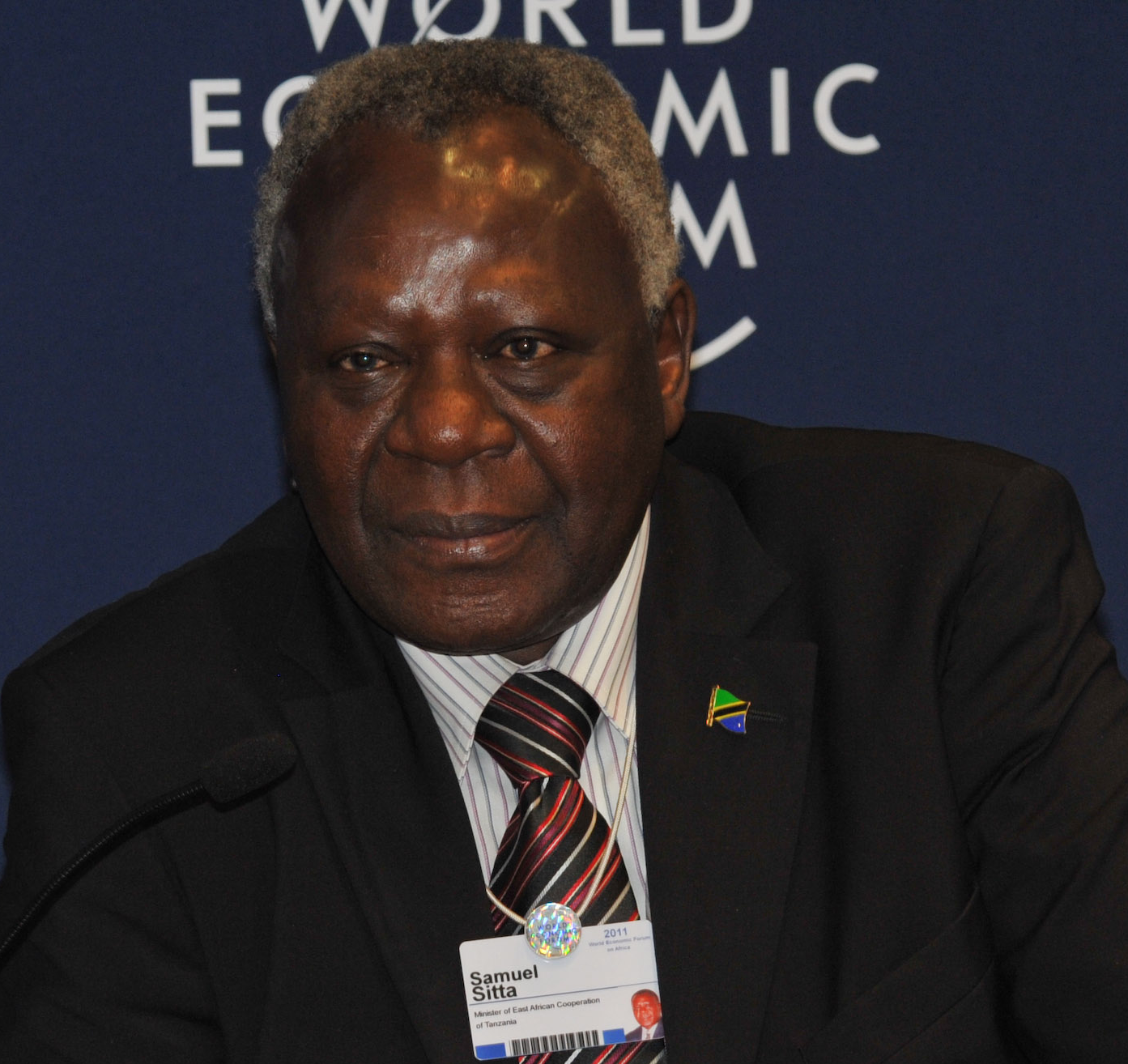
Samuel Sitta

- 4 March – Joseph Rwegasira politician and diplomat (b. 1935).
- 13 April – Matthias Joseph Isuja, Roman Catholic bishop (b. 1929).
- 14 August – Aboud Jumbe, politician (b. 1920)
- 7 November – Samuel Sitta, politician (b. 1942)
