= 2019 in Tanzania =

- Decades: 1990s; 2000s; 2010s; 2020s
- See also: Other events of 2019; Timeline of Tanzanian history

Events of 2019 in Tanzania.

== Incumbents ==
- President: John Magufuli
- Vice-President: Samia Suluhu
- Prime Minister: Kassim Majaliwa
- Chief Justice: Ibrahim Hamis Juma

== Events ==
- 10 August - Morogoro tanker explosion
