= Li Jinglan =

Chinese-Tanzanian interpreter (died 2022)

Li Jinglan (died 5 August 2022), nicknamed Mama Li, was a Chinese-Tanzanian interpreter. She was brought to Mbeya, Tanzania in 1975 to serve as an interpreter during the construction of the Tanzania–Zambia Railway. After a year, she was moved to Dar es Salaam, where she worked in close contact with then-president Julius Nyerere. After travelling back and forth between China and East Africa, she settled in Dar es Salaam where she began a hotel business. She faced harassment, robbery, and rape, and her business closed after a few years.

In 2003, the National Housing Corporation (NHC) ordered Li to vacate her flat in Oyster Bay. She successfully fought off the order in court. The NHC filed a second order in 2005, and broke into her flat and confiscated her belongings the next year. In 2012, the High Court of Tanzania Land Division declared Li the flat's legal tenant and ordered the NHC to pay TSh477 million (US$207,000) in compensation. However, the execution of the High Court's decision was delayed by the NHC over twenty times. Li died on 5 August 2022 from a stroke, and her body was cremated in Makumbusho.

== Biography ==
Li Jinglan arrived in Mbeya, Tanzania in 1975, where she was among the 100 Chinese nationals brought for their expertise during the construction of the Tanzania–Zambia Railway. She was already fluent in Swahili when she was sent, having worked as a producer of Swahili-language programmes for Radio Beijing. The move was sudden; she was forced to leave behind her infant son. In Mbeya, she worked as an interpreter for Chinese instructors training Tanzanian locomotive drivers. She also trained locals in train station management. After one year, she moved to Dar es Salaam to work for another Chinese-backed project, bringing her into regular contact with then-president Julius Nyerere. She returned to Mbeya a few years later, where she worked in an iron ore research project for the State Mining Corporation (STAMICO). After about three years in Tanzania, she returned to China. She was sent to Nairobi, Kenya for the construction of the Moi International Sports Centre, again returning to China after several years.

Li returned to Tanzania in 1989 as part of an academic exchange program. She studied Swahili at the University of Dar es Salaam (UDSM), completing her studied in 1993 and travelling back to China. After returning to Tanzania again, she started a hotel business in Msasani near CCBRT Hospital. She faced harassment and robberies at her business, and she was raped six times in one year. Her business closed down after a few years.

=== Dispute with the National Housing Corporation ===
On 23 September 2003, the National Housing Corporation (NHC) sent Li an order to vacate her flat on Haile Selassie Road in Oyster Bay, just one year after her lease had begun. The NHC accused her of obstructing other tenants' access to the flat's commercial wing, damaging the septic tank, and preventing NHC officials from accessing the flat. After she failed to reach an agreement with the NHC, she challenged the order in court; the order was overturned on 19 November 2003, and the court provided guidelines for resolution. The NHC filed a second order on 16 November 2005, this time stating that she had violated the court's conditions. On 9 May 2006, when she left for Aga Khan Hospital after falling and injuring her arm, the NHC – through the broker Manyoni Auctioneers – broke into her flat and confiscated her belongings.

After six years of legal battles, the High Court Land Division declared that Li was still a lawful tenant and ordered the NHC to pay TSh477 million (US$207,000) in compensation on 27 April 2012. However, the NHC managed to successfully petition the High Court to delay the decision's execution over twenty times.

=== Death ===
Li died on 5 August 2022 at Rabininsia Memorial Hospital after being treated for a stroke for several weeks. Her body was cremated at Hindu Crematorium in Makumbusho. At a farewell ceremony, High Court judge Rugemeleza Nshalla called on the Tanzanian judicial system to better enforce timely justice.
