= Ambilikile Mwasapile =

Tanzanian priest (died 2021)

- Born: 1934/1935; Tanzania
- Died: 2021 (aged 85–86); Arusha Region
- Occupations: Bishop; Traditional Healer
- Years active: 1934-2021
- Known for: Kikombe cha Babu

Ambilikile Mwasapile (1934/1935 – 30 July 2021), also known as Babu wa Loliondo, was a Tanzanian priest of the Lutheran Church who used a tree known as mugariga to make a non-flavored drink which he administered to patients reporting various chronic diseases.

== Life ==
Mwasapile lived in Samunge village in Loliondo, near Ngorongoro in northern Tanzania.

== Vision of healing ==
Mwasapile told people at that time that he had a vision in which he was instructed to make the potion he administers. His vision was of a tree that provided medicine and that many people would come to be healed. Upon waking, in the daily routine that followed, he claimed to have met a woman who had HIV, and she told him that she came for medicine. Mwasapile claimed to have followed a vision, gone into the bush, and taken portions of the tree as directed.

== Popularization ==
Reports of healing from Mwasapile potion spread, and he began to sell the concoction. At one point in 2011 the treatment was quite popular, although its popularity trailed off when it became clear that the potion was not the cure-all many thought it to be.

Newspaper reports regularly picked up what notable visitor had been to the place. Notable people who visited Mwasapile include legislators and cabinet ministers locally and scores of personalities especially from eastern Africa, among whom are cited the wife of DRC president Joseph Kabila.

There were reports in the local dailies in Kenya of politicians and ordinary citizens who chartered helicopters and vans to transport people to Loliondo. The town had long queues of people seeking the herbal concoction.
