= Anna Senkoro =

Tanzanian politician

Personal details
- Political party: Progressive Party of Tanzania-Maendeleo

Anna Claudia Senkoro (1962 – 4 January 2017) was a Tanzanian politician and member of the Progressive Party of Tanzania-Maendeleo (PPT-Maendeleo).

Running as the PPT-Maendeleo presidential candidate in the 14 December 2005 elections, Senkoro placed eighth out of ten candidates, receiving 0.17% of the vote (18741 votes). She was the only woman to run in the election, and the first woman in Tanzanian history to run for president.

== Death ==
Senkoro died on 4 January 2017, aged 54.
