= Martha Jachi Umbulla =

Tanzanian politician (1955–2021)

Martha Umbulla

Member of Parliament
- In office November 2015 – January 2021
- Constituency: (Special Seats)

Personal details
- Born: 10 November 1955 Babati, Manyara, Tanzania
- Died: 20 January 2021 (aged 65) Mumbai, India
- Resting place: Babati, Manyara
- Party: Chama Cha Mapinduzi
- Education: Tabora Girls Secondary School; Korogwe Girls Secondary School; Reading University; ESAMI

Martha Jachi Umbulla (10 November 1955 – 20 January 2021) was a Tanzanian CCM politician.

== Career ==
Umbulla was a member of the National Assembly as a member of the Chama Cha Mapinduzi from 2005 to 2021.

== Death ==
Umbulla died at HCG Hospital in Mumbai, India in January 2021.

== See also ==
- List of MPs elected in the 2015 Tanzania general election
