= 2015 Tanzania flood =

- Location of Tanzania in Africa
- Date: 4 March 2015
- Location: Shinyanga Region, Tanzania
- Deaths: 38

Location of Shinyanga Region in Tanzania

The 2015 Tanzania flood occurred on 4 March 2015 in Shinyanga Region, Tanzania. The flood occurred during Tanzania's rainy season the, months of March, April, and May, during which rainfall ranges from about 150 to 250 mm (5.9 to 9.8 in). Most people were unable to escape the floods. As a result, least 50 people were killed and another 82 were wounded in the flood. After an original tally of 38 casualties, more died receiving medical care in hospitals. The flood further affected some 3,500 people. Many houses were damaged due to hail and strong winds. This blocked roads and made rescue operations difficult. Farmland 1,000 km (620 mi) away from the Dar es Salaam, the largest and most commercial city in Tanzania, was also affected, devastating the poor agriculturally-dependent people of the region. Crops such as maize and cotton and livestock were impacted by the flood.

== See also ==
- 2015 Malawi floods
- Geography of Tanzania
