= Mariam Mfaki =

Tanzanian politician (1946–2015)

Mariam Salum Mfaki (26 November 1946 – 21 July 2015) was a Tanzanian politician. She served as a special seats MP of the National Assembly for Dodoma from 2000 until her death in 2015.

Mfaki began her political career as the Secretary for the Chama Cha Mapinduzi (CCM) Women's Organisation, (UWT), based in the Kondoa District, from 1973 to 1976. She was then appointed the Dodoma Regional UWT Secretary from 1976 to 1983. In 1984, she was transferred to the office of the Prime Minister of Tanzania as a ward secretary, a position she held from 1984 to 1998.

Mfaki died at Dodoma Regional Hospital on 21 July 2015, at the age of 69. She had been diagnosed with cancer in 2012. Mfaki was buried in her home village in the Dodoma Region.
