= Vinod Chohan =

Tanzanian-born engineer (1949–2017)

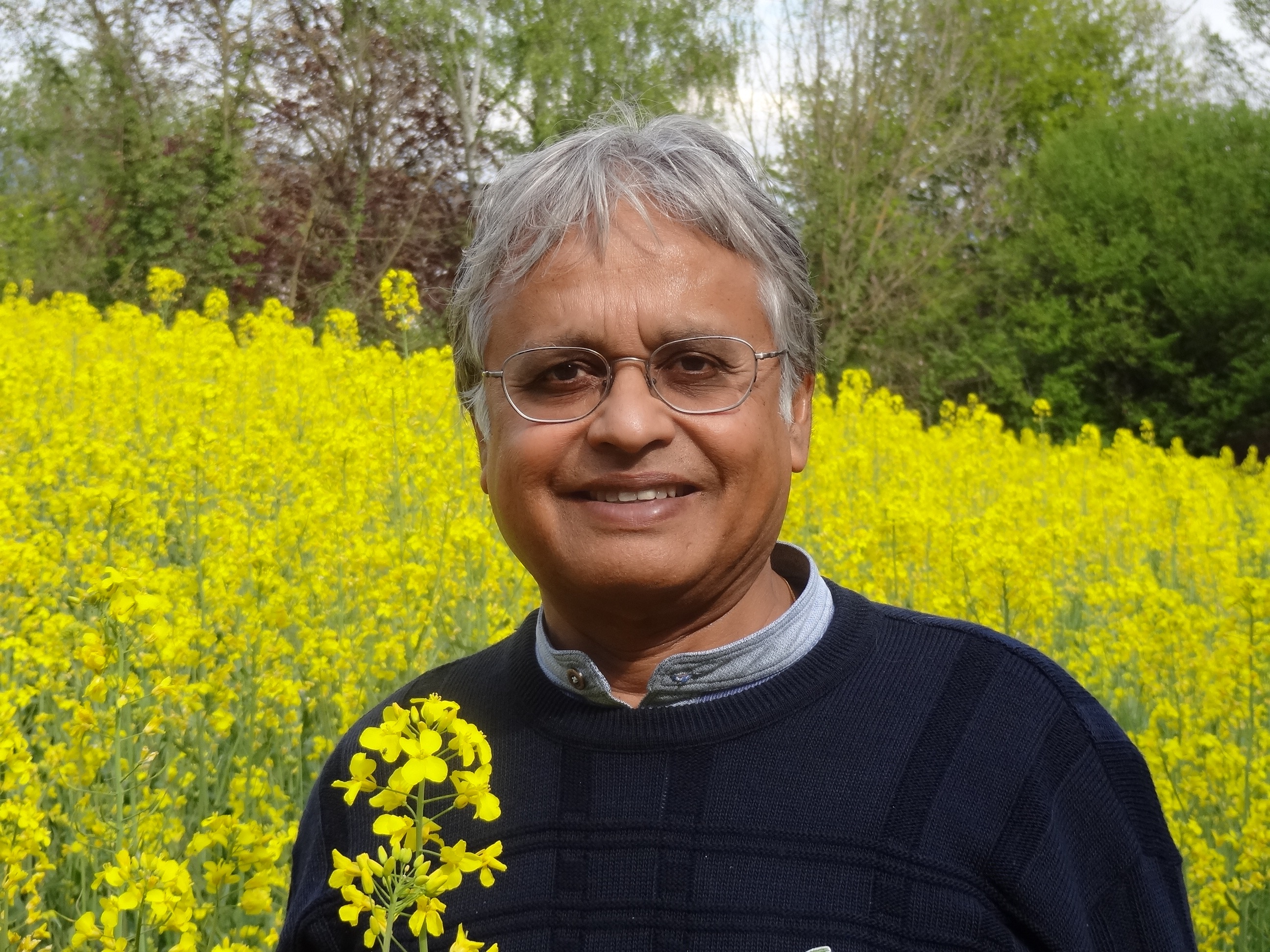
- Born: 1 May 1949; Dar es Salaam, Tanganyika
- Died: 12 June 2017 (aged 68); Geneva, Switzerland
- Scientific career
- Fields: Engineering
- Workplaces: CERN

Vinod Chandrasinh Chohan (1 May 1949 – 12 June 2017) was a Tanzanian-born accelerator specialist and engineer. He was a Senior Staff Member at CERN for nearly 40 years.

He held a leading position at CERN's Antiproton Accumulator, a machine that was part of the infrastructure connected to the UA1 and UA2 experiments, where the W and Z bosons were discovered in 1983. Carlo Rubbia and Simon van der Meer received the 1984 Nobel Prize in Physics for this discovery. Chohan worked closely with the latter on the antiproton accumulator.

Chohan was a substantial contributor to the Large Hadron Collider (LHC), leading the team that tested, measured and trained more than a thousand superconducting magnets for the LHC.

During his nearly 40 years as a staff member at CERN he held technical and management positions such as in beam diagnostics, instrumentation, accelerator studies, controls, testing of superconducting magnet and safety.

== Early life and education ==
Vinod Chohan was born in Dar es Salaam, Tanganyika on 1 May 1949 into a Saurashtran Gujarati Indo-Tanzanian Hindu family. He commenced his secondary education at Govt Indian Secondary School, later called Azania Secondary School in Upanga, Tanzania, and in 1967, moved to Colston's School in Bristol. Chohan studied electrical and electronic engineering at University College, Cardiff, and obtained his PhD at University of Essex in 1974.

== Career ==
Vinod Chohan joined CERN in January 1975 as a Fellow in the Proton Synchrotron division. From 1977 to 1980 he worked at Swiss Institute for Nuclear Research, in the Beam Dynamics Group of the Cyclotron Accelerator Division.

In 1980, he returned to CERN as a staff member in the Proton Synchrotron division, under which he later worked with beam diagnostics and safety. During his nearly 40 years at CERN he has held various positions, such as Accelerator Operation Coordinator for the Antiproton Accumulator Complex. This machine created antiprotons for the Super Proton Synchrotron, and was part of the infrastructure that led to the discovery of the W and Z bosons for which Carlo Rubbia and Simon van der Meer received the 1984 Nobel Prize in Physics.

During his tenure at CERN, he was associated with Fermilab for the commissioning of an antiproton source 1985 and 1986 and at the Los Alamos National Laboratory where he collaborated on Proton Storage Ring in 1989. In 1993 he taught a course at the CERN Accelerator School on Accelerator Systems, held at the Centre for Advance Technology, Indore, India.

In 2002, he joined the LHC Project team responsible for developing CERN's new project, the Large Hadron Collider (LHC). Chohan led and managed the team responsible for testing hundreds of superconducting magnets to be used in the collider. This was a tedious process: 1706 superconducting magnets – each 14 meters long — were to be tested. From the beginning of the testing in 2001 to 2002, only 21 magnets were tested, due to shortage of staff. The situation improved when one started recruiting personnel from India, for a year at the time, as part of the CERN-India Collaboration on LHC. Over 7 years Chohan led this international team which fully tested, qualified and trained up about 1300 superconducting magnets for use in the LHC. Chohan became member of the joint CERN-Department of Atomic Energy, India committee for the CERN-India Collaboration in 2007.

During the LHC construction, he has featured in London Science Museum's Big Bang exhibition in 2007 and in 2008 he was featured in BBC Horizon, a documentary television series.

After the LHC start-up in 2008, Chohan led the team responsible for technical coordination at all of CERN's accelerators and beam experimental areas, except for the LHC.

Chohan became member of the Institution of Engineering and Technology in 1981 and became a fellow in November 2013.

== Publications ==
- Chohan, Vinod C (2011). "Simon van der Meer (1925–2011): A modest genius of accelerator science". Rev. Accel. Sci. Technol. 4 (1): 279–291. doi:10.1142/s1793626811000550.
- Chohan, Vinod (2012). Simon van der Meer and his legacy to CERN and particle accelerators. Geneva: CERN.
- Chohan, Vinod; Van der Meer, Simon (December 1989). "Aspects of automation and applications in the CERN antiproton source". CERN. 293 (1–2): 98–102. Bibcode:1990NIMPA.293...98C. doi:10.1016/0168-9002(90)91408-4.
- Publications on the Antiproton Accumulator
  - Chohan, V. (August 1989), The Future of AAC Controls System: Options for Discussion (PDF), PS/AR Notes, CERN
  - Chohan, V. (23 September 1986), Status of control system for AA and AC (PDF), ACOL Notes, CERN
  - Chohan, V. (August 1990). "The CERN antiproton source: Controls aspects of the additional collector ring and fast sampling devices". Nucl. Instrum. Methods Phys. Res. A. 293 (1–2): 93–97. Bibcode:1990NIMPA.293...93C. doi:10.1016/0168-9002(90)91407-3.
  - Chohan, Vinod; Johnson, C; Potier, J P; Miller, M (2005). "Fast CAMAC-based sampling digitizers and digital filters for beam diagnostics and control in the CERN PS complex". Computing in Accelerator Design and Operation. Lecture Notes in Physics. Vol. 215. pp. 405–410. doi:10.1007/3540139095_138. ISBN 978-3-540-13909-6.
