= 2021 Dar es Salaam shooting =

Terrorist incident in Tanzania

Dar es Salaam shooting
- Location: Dar es Salaam, Tanzania
- Date: 25 August 2021
- Attack type: Spree shooting
- Weapon: Rifle
- Deaths: 5 (including the perpetrator)
- Injuries: 9
- Perpetrator: Hamza Mohamed
- Motive: Islamic extremism

On 25 August 2021, a gunman opened fire at two locations in Dar es Salaam, Tanzania. He first killed two police officers at an intersection and stole their rifles. He walked several hundred metres to the French embassy, where he shot and killed another officer and a security guard. The gunman injured six other people, and was shot dead by police. The attack was carried out in daytime on Ali Hassan Mwinyi Road, one of Dar es Salaam's main avenues in the diplomatic quarter.

== Background to the massacre ==
On 2 September 2021, authorities confirmed that the attacker, identified as Hamza Mohamed, was motivated by Islamic extremism. Before the shooting, he had visited social media pages related to the Islamic State of Iraq and the Levant. Simon Sirro, the chief police inspector leading the investigation, said the attack was likely motivated by the Tanzanian government's effort to combat Islamic terrorists in Mozambique. Such attacks were relatively rare in Tanzania, although there had been some previous Islamist attacks, including the killings of police officers and civil servants in the eastern district of Kibiti in 2016 and 2017.

== Commemoration ==
Dozens of Tanzanian police officers, politicians and citizens gathered in Dar es Salaam on the evening after the attack to pay tribute to the victims.
