= Robert Kisanga =

Tanzanian judge

- Born: 20 June 1933
- Died: 23 January 2018; Regency Hospital in Dar es Salaam
- Citizenship: Tanzania
- Education: University of Birmingham (LLB) in England
- Occupation: Judge
- Organization: High Court of Tanzania

Robert Kisanga (20 June 1933 – 23 January 2018) was a Tanzanian judge. He served as a judge in the High Court of Tanzania and was a Justice of Appeal at the Court of Appeal of the United Republic of Tanzania. He served as the first Chairman of the Tanzania Commission for Human Rights and Good Governance before retiring in 2008.

He was educated at the University of Birmingham (LLB) in England. He was also a Barrister in Middle Temple in London. He was awarded an honorary doctorate by Birmingham University in 2010.

Kisanga died on 23 January 2018 at Regency Hospital in Dar es Salaam where he was receiving medical treatment.
