= Amani W. A. Kabourou =

Tanzanian politician

Aman Walid A. Kabourou (23 May 1949 – 6 March 2018) was a Tanzanian politician.

Elected to the National Assembly for the first time in 1995 as a member of the Chadema, a political party he had served as secretary-general, he won reelection in 2000 and 2005 before joining the Chama Cha Mapinduzi in 2006. He represented CCM in the African Union's Pan-African Parliament. Kabourou also served as member of the second East African Legislative Assembly (EALA) between the period of 5 June 2006 - 4 June 2012. At EALA, he served on the Accounts Committee and the Committee on Regional Affairs and Conflict Resolution. From 2012 to 2017 he served as CCM chairman for Kigoma region.
