= Eugen Mwaiposa =

Tanzanian politician

Honourable Eugen Mwaiposa MP

Member of Parliament for Ukonga
- In office November 2010 – 2 June 2015
- Preceded by: Milton Mahanga

Personal details
- Born: 23 November 1960 Kilimanjaro, Tanganyika
- Died: 2 June 2015 (aged 54) Dodoma, Tanzania
- Party: CCM
- Education: University of National and World Economy; University of Strathclyde

Eugen Elishiringa Mwaiposa (23 November 1960 – 2 June 2015) was a Tanzanian CCM politician and member of parliament for Ukonga constituency from 2010 to 2015.

== Education ==
Born in the Kilimanjaro Region of Tanzania, Mwaiposa commenced her education at Nkweseko Primary School from 1967 to 1974. She graduated from high school in 1985 at Shinyanga Commercial School (Shycom).

She was a graduate of University of National and World Economy previously known as Higher Economics Institute "Karl Marx", in Sofia, Bulgaria where she got her bachelor's degree in international economic relations in 1986 to 1992 and University of Strathclyde in Glasgow where she received her master's degree from 2004 to 2007.

== Before politics ==
Before joining politics, Mwaiposa worked for different branches of CRDB Bank in Dar Es Salaam from 1986 to 2008. Mwaiposa was an entrepreneur who believed in giving women in poverty an opportunity to start small businesses for themselves. She was the chairperson of Kipunguni SACCOSS, which provided loans to individuals or group of people who needed capital and also acted as a bank to secure funds for the community.

She died in 2015.
