= Godfrey Mdimi Mhogolo =

Anglican bishop

- Born: Godfrey Mdimi Mhogolo; 14 June 1951; Nala, Dodoma- Tanzania
- Died: March 28, 2014 (aged 62); Johannesburg
- Education: Ridley College (Melbourne)
- Occupation: Bishop
- Years active: 1974-2014
- Spouse: Irene
- Children: Nyemo, Lisa, Wendo

Godfrey Mdimi Mhogolo (14 June 1951 – 27 March 2014) was an Anglican bishop and the fifth bishop of the Anglican Diocese of Central Tanganyika.

== Education ==
Mdimi Mhogolo studied theology in Kongwa in Tanzania and at Ridley College (Melbourne), Australia (1976-1981) when Leon Morris was principal. Fellow students at Ridley College (Melbourne) found him deep and spiritual with a good sense of humour.

== Ordained ministry ==
Mdimi Mhogolo was Principal of St. Philip's College, Kongwa in the 1980s where he worked with New Zealand Church Missionary Society (NZCMS) missionaries.

Mdimi Mhogolo was ordained a bishop in 1989 for the Anglican Diocese of Central Tanganyika, in Tanzania, a huge diocese.

As a connection between Ridley College (Melbourne) and Tanzania where Mdimi Mhogolo came from, Rt Rev Alfred Stanway was an Australian who in 1950 was appointed Bishop of Central Tanganyika by the Archbishop of Canterbury before Mdimi Mhogolo. Alfred Stanway was later administrator at Ridley College (Melbourne) under Leon Morris and one residential hall at Ridley College (Melbourne) was named Stanway in honour of him.

From 2001 bishop Mdimi Mhogolo was the first to ordain women in Tanzania of whom there are 40 in 2015 starting with Revd Canon Hilda Kabia who became first woman principal of Msalato Theological College in 2015 and first woman theological principal in Tanzania. Leon Morris was behind ordaining women in the Anglican Church of Australia including Barbara Darling who was the first woman bishop ordained in Anglican Diocese of Melbourne.

"As bishop, Mdimi Mhogolo fostered projects such as The Carpenter’s Kids for DCT’s most vulnerable children. He moved Msalato Theological College, founded by Australian bishop Ken Short in Church Missionary Society, from a Bible School to the degree level, enriched four primary and secondary schools, two hospitals, and the Mackay House Health Clinic where" a US missionary from the Episcopal Church of North Georgia Diocese of Atlanta worked with him.

Mdimi Mohogolo spoke at Anglican Church of Canada The Consultation of Anglican Bishops in Dialogue in June 2012 of which there is a YouTube recording of an interview he had with a Canadian professor. He spoke of church unity issues in the Anglican Communion at Global Anglican Future Conference (GAFCON) and Lambeth Conference UK at which he participated. He said Canadian and African Anglican Churches differed in what they saw as important and that the Anglican Church needed to restructure to improve collaboration.

== Death ==
Mdimi Mohogolo died in Johannesburg, South Africa from a severe lung infection. 2000 were at the funeral with cathedral overflowing. Anne Makinda, speaker of the Tanzanian National Assembly, "said the late Bishop Mhogolo was the friend of everyone and that his death was a big shock."

== Views on homosexuality ==
Mhogolo was a moderate on the issue of homosexuality compared to many African Anglicans who strongly condemned homosexuality or even denied its existence in Africa; he sought to avoid a schism in the church over the issue. In 2007 he wrote that homosexuality as an issue "is not fundamental to the Christian faith, although many try to make it that way". He also wrote on "Human Sexuality in the Anglican Communion" for the Wiley-Blackwell Companion to the Anglican Communion (2013). In his Canadian interview in June 2012 he said in the Africa Anglican Church homosexuality was not as critical an issue as in the Episcopal Church (United States) and Anglican Church of Canada.

== Publications ==
He has written a number of books, mainly in Swahili, including:

- Endelea kukua maadili ya kikristo, Central Tanganyika Press, 1985
- Utawala Bora, 2004
- Ibada, 2012
