= Tegeta escrow scandal =

2014 Tanzanian corruption scheme

The Tegeta escrow account scandal is a 2014 multi million-dollar corruption scheme in the government of Tanzania. Reports and documents show that between US$250 million and $800 million were transferred from the Bank of Tanzania, the country's central bank, and distributed illegally among government officials.
