= COVID-19 pandemic in Tanzania =

Ongoing COVID-19 viral pandemic in Tanzania

- Disease: COVID-19
- Pathogen: SARS-CoV-2
- Location: Tanzania
- First outbreak: Wuhan, Hubei, China
- Index case: Arusha
- Arrival date: 16 March 2020 (6 years, 7 months, 1 week and 5 days)
- Confirmed cases: 43,655
- Recovered: 42,232
- Deaths: 846

Government website
- www.moh.go.tz/en/covid-19-info

The COVID-19 pandemic in Tanzania was a part of the ongoing worldwide pandemic of coronavirus disease 2019 (COVID-19) caused by severe acute respiratory syndrome coronavirus 2 (SARS-CoV-2). The COVID-19 pandemic was confirmed to have reached Tanzania in March 2020.

The Ministry of Health, Community Development, Gender, Elderly and Children in The United Republic Of Tanzania uses the Integrated Disease Surveillance and Response (IDSR) strategy to monitor reportable diseases and conditions to detect and respond to the leading causes of illness, death, and disabilities. Subsequently, reports of the spread of the virus have been actively gathered over the years and relevant policies put in place as situations unfold.

== Background ==
On 12 January 2020, the World Health Organization (WHO) confirmed that a novel coronavirus was the cause of a respiratory illness in a cluster of people in Wuhan, Hubei, China, which was reported to the WHO on 31 December 2019.

The case fatality ratio for COVID-19 has been much lower than SARS of 2003, but the transmission has been significantly greater, with a significant total death toll.

In May 2020, Fatma Karume, a human rights activist, said authorities are discouraging people from going to hospitals to avoid overwhelming them, but they are not giving adequate guidance about the virus. Karume said: "When you are disempowering a whole nation by withholding information and creating doubt on how they should respond to the crisis, the outcome can be disastrous."

COVID-19 related news are censored as misinformation or disinformation. The distribution of non-governmental information has been made into a criminal offence by the government. The government released a list of qualified persons to educate the public about COVID-19, and directed that all media source information only from those on the list. Multiple individuals were arrested and fined because of spreading information about COVID-19. The lack of transparency and restricted freedoms have drawn criticism from Reporters Without Borders.

However, on 28 June 2021, President Samia Suluhu Hassan announced COVID-19 statistics to the public for the first time since May 2020, with 100 new cases in Tanzania and 70 people in a critical state on ventilators.

== Timeline ==
=== March 2020 ===
- On 16 March, the first case in Tanzania was confirmed in Arusha. It was a 46-year-old Tanzanian who had come to Arusha from Belgium.
- On 17 March, the Prime Minister Kassim Majaliwa announced a range of measures, including closing schools.
- On 18 March, two other cases in Tanzania were reported.
- On 19 March, two new cases were reported, bringing the total number of confirmed cases to six. Five of these cases were identified in Dar es Salaam, Tanzania's largest city, with the other case being from Zanzibar.
- On 22 March, it was announced that cases had risen to 12.
- On 23 March, the Government announced that all incoming travelers from COVID affected countries would be placed in quarantine at their own cost for 14 days.
- On 25 March, it was announced that Zanzibar recorded its second case.
- On 26 March, the first COVID recovery was announced, of the first Arusha patient.
- On 28 March, a third case was recorded in Zanzibar.
- On 30 March, there were 5 more recorded cases, including two in Zanzibar and three in mainland Tanzania, bringing the cumulative total to 19.
- On 31 March, the first COVID death was recorded, in Dar es Salaam.

=== April 2020 ===
- On 1 April, one new case and one recovery in Dar es Salaam were announced, bringing the cumulative totals to 20 cases, two recoveries, and one death.
- On 3 April, a third recovery in Kagera was announced, bringing the active case number to 16.
- On 5 April, two new cases were reported in Zanzibar.
- On 6 April, a further two new cases were reported in Dar es Salaam and Mwanza, bringing the cumulative total to 24.
- On 7 April, two more cases recovered, bringing total recoveries to five.
- On 8 April, one new case was recorded. President John Magufuli urged the faithfuls to go to pray in churches and mosques in the belief that it will protect them. He said that the coronavirus is a devil, therefore "cannot survive in the body of Jesus Christ, it will burn".
- On 10 April, it was announced that there were five new cases on mainland, two new cases on Zanzibar, and two deaths on the mainland, bringing the cumulative case count to 32, and cumulative deaths to three.
- On 12 April, all international passenger flights were suspended.
- On 13 April, it was announced that there were 64 new cases on mainland, and three new cases in Zanzibar. In addition, two recoveries in Zanzibar were announced.
- On 14 April, the Prime Minister announced four more cases in Dar es Salaam, bringing the cumulative total to 53 cases.
- On 15 April, Zanzibar health minister Hamad Rashid Mohammed, reported six more cases, two recoveries, and its first death. On the same day, 29 new cases on mainland were recorded. This brought the cumulative total for Tanzania to 88, with cumulative recoveries of 11 and cumulative deaths of four.
- On 16 April, six people tested positive in Zanzibar, bringing the total to 94.
- On 17 April, 53 people tested positive, 38 in Dar es Salaam, 10 in Zanzibar, 1 in Mwanza, 1 in Pwani, 1 in Lindi, and 1 in Kagera, bringing the total to 147 and cumulative death of 5 people.
- On 19 April, 23 new cases were reported in Zanzibar, where 2 people died.
- On 20 April, a further 87 people were reported to be infected with the virus, including 16 from Zanzibar. In addition, 3 new deaths on the mainland were reported, bringing cumulative deaths in Tanzania to 10.
- On 22 April, the Prime Minister announces the case count had risen to 284, with 11 recovered and the death toll remaining at 10.
- On 24 April, 37 more patients had recovered, while 15 more were infected with the disease in Zanzibar.
- On 28 April, 7 patients in Zanzibar tested positive.
- On 29 April, 196 more people were infected, bringing the total to 480, where 167 had recovered and 16 died.

=== May 2020 ===
- On 2 May, opposition leader Freeman Mbowe called for the suspension of Parliament for at least three weeks after the deaths of three MP's (Gertrude Rwakatare, Richard Ndassa and Augustine Mahiga) of unknown causes in the previous eleven days. He blamed the deaths on COVID-19 and asked for testing for all MP's, parliament staff and family members.
- On 4 May, President John Magufuli suspended the head of testing at Tanzania's national health laboratory and fired its director after the lab allegedly returned false positive test results. Magufuli said he had deliberately submitted biological samples from a papaya, a quail and a goat to test the laboratory's accuracy; the lab diagnosed these samples as positive for coronavirus.
- On 7 May, it was announced that for Zanzibar, the cumulative total of recorded cases was 134, the cumulative number of recoveries was 16 and the cumulative numbers of recorded deaths was 5. Of the active cases, 41 were at health facilities and 72 were cared for and followed up at home.
- The U.S. embassy in Tanzania issued a warning on 13 May that the risk of contracting COVID-19 in Dar es Salaam was extremely high. It believed cases were growing at an exponential rate in Dar es Salaam and other places and expected hospital capacity to be insufficient. Private local broadcaster Kwanza Online TV was subsequently taken off air for 11 months by the regulator for having posted the embassy's warning on its Instagram account.
- Tanzanian authorities stopped reporting case numbers in May. When the reporting stopped, the number of confirmed cases stood at 509, the number of recovered patients was 183, and 21 patients had died.
- Several truck drivers tested positive at the Kenya border, and Kenya closed the border for non-cargo. The two countries agreed to supply testing and facilities for truckers.
- On 21 May, the President announced that colleges will reopen and form six secondary school students will return to school from 1 June, sports will resume from 1 June, and that international flights will resume, without any quarantine, from 27 May.
- Opposition activists accused the government of covering up the true scale of the pandemic, claiming that, while the official stats remained stuck on 509 cases and 21 deaths, with no test results being reported since 4 May, at least 412 have died in Dar es Salaam alone, and that 16,000 to 20,000 people have been infected countrywide.
- The lack of official data on testing, recoveries, active cases and fatalities generated an interest from epidemiologists and modellers to estimate the true extent of COVID-19 infection in Tanzania. Pearson et al. estimate that Tanzania reached 1000 infected patients at some point between 6 April and 2 May 2020, and 10,000 infections not before 20 April and no later than 26 May 2020. Modelling results published by the MRC Centre for Global Infectious Disease Analysis at Imperial College London suggest that the true number of infections in Tanzania between 29 April and 26 May 2020 was 24,869. Pearson et al. calculate that after three months of no mitigating measures being taken, Tanzania should expect between 5,900 and 19 million symptomatic cases, and up to 16,000 additional deaths due to COVID-19. Similarly in 2022, modeling by WHO's Regional Office for Africa suggested that the true number of infections in 2020 was around 14 million and the true number of COVID-19 deaths in 2020 was between 1069 and 12,000.

=== June 2020 ===
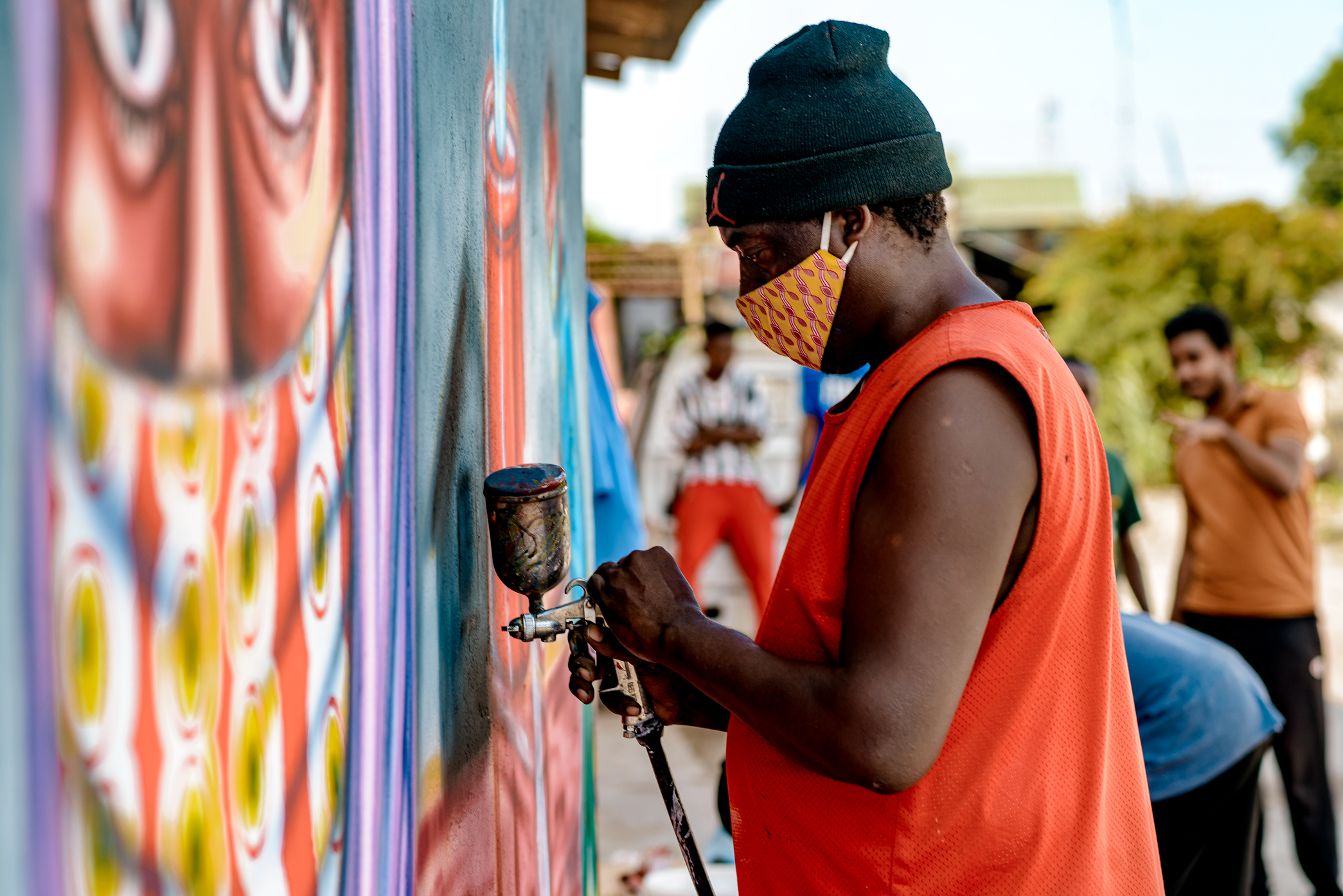
Local artist creating Corona awareness mural (June 2020)

- On 8 June, President Magufuli declared Tanzania to be free of coronavirus, which he attributed to the prayers offered by its citizens. There are reports that several COVID-19 test centres shut down following the announcement and that patients displaying symptoms have been denied testing on account of Tanzania having no virus.
- On 16 June, the president announced that schools at all levels would re-open on 29 June.

=== July to December 2020 ===
- In July, the government adopted and published new subsidiary legislation introducing mandatory registration of bloggers, online discussion forums, radio and television webcasters, as well as criminalizing the publication of "information with regards to the outbreak of a deadly or contagious diseases in the country or elsewhere without the approval of the respective authorities".
- On 6 August, John Nkengasong of Africa CDC expressed his concerns over the lack of data from Tanzania and the detrimental impact on the development and implementation of an Africa-wide strategy.
- In August, the government adopted and published new subsidiary legislation banning all local media from broadcasting foreign content without prior government permission, including content relating to COVID-19 in Tanzania.
- In December there were reports that a number of patients at the Aga Khan, Shree Hindu Mandal, and Rabininsia Memorial hospitals in Dar es Salaam were coming in with symptoms of coronavirus and subsequently tested positive for COVID-19. Moreover, conspiracies that funerals were taking place in secret at night, and that former president Benjamin Mkapa's cause of death was not heart attack as officially stated, but COVID-19.

=== January to March 2021 ===
- In the first week of 2021, a Danish resident returning from Tanzania tested positive for the B.1.1.7 variant of COVID-19. Denmark's Statens Serum Institut noted it was not possible to tell where the infected person had caught the virus. Two more Danish residents returning from Tanzania tested positive for the 501.V2 variant on 19 January, representing only the second and third confirmed cases of the 501.V2 variant in Denmark.
- On 19 January, the International School Moshi announced that one of its students had tested positive for COVID-19 and was isolating, while the class of the student would be taught online until 1 February. Two days later the school issued an apology for issuing false information and stated that the operations of the school had not been halted.
- On 26 January, the President of the Tanzania Episcopal Conference, Archbishop Nyaisonga in a letter addressed to archbishops, bishops and retired bishops warned against a "possible new wave of coronavirus infections".
- On 27 January, President John Magufuli expressed doubts about the COVID-19 vaccines during a speech in Chato, Geita Region. "If the white man was able to come up with vaccinations, then vaccinations for AIDS would have been brought, tuberculosis would be a thing of the past, vaccines for malaria and cancer would have been found", he declared. His speech was rebuffed by the regional WHO director Matshidiso Moeti who urged Tanzania to ramp up public health measures and vaccination. Magufuli also rejected lockdown measures, reasoning in a broadcast speech: "I don't expect to announce any lockdown because our living God will protect us. We will continue to take other health precautions, including steam therapy."
- On 31 January, the Alliance for Change and Transparency announced that its chairman and First Vice-president of Zanzibar, Seif Sharif Hamad along with his wife and a number of his aides had contracted COVID-19 and were in the hospital. He later died while undergoing treatment.
- On 1 February, Health Minister Dorothy Gwajima said that Tanzania has no interest in taking part in a vaccination programme, despite encouragement from the WHO to do so. Instead she reiterated the government's suggested hygiene practices, which include drinking plenty of water and taking local herbs.
- On 10 February, the United States warned that Tanzanian health facilities are in danger of being overwhelmed following a sharp increase in cases in January.
- On 11 February, concerns were expressed by Member of Parliament Zacharia Issaay over the high number of deaths due to pneumonia and other respiratory diseases in his constituency Mbulu Urban.
- On 12 February, it was reported that major hospitals in Dar es Salaam were inundated with patients who had COVID-19 symptoms. Intensive care units at these hospitals were full, and beds, oxygen, and respirators were in short supply.
- On 15 February, the Medical Association of Tanzania issued a statement linking an increase in respiratory illness deaths to ongoing outbreaks of various diseases including COVID-19. The statement also urged health practitioners to educate patients and urged citizens to visit healthcare facilities as soon as they experience symptoms.
- On 15 February, the Oman Minister of Health said that 18 percent of travelers arriving from Tanzania tested positive for COVID-19, a number he described as "very high". He also said that Oman was considering halting flights from Tanzania.
- On 17 February, Seif Sharif Hamad, 77, Vice President of Zanzibar died of acute pneumonia related to COVID-19. A top aide to President Magufuli, Chief Secretary John Kijazi and Namibia's third secretary to Tanzania Selina Tjihero also died during the same week. Sources close to the matter said they had contracted COVID-19.
- On 18 February, the bar association of mainland Tanzania, Tanganyika Law Society, issued a statement calling on the government to acknowledge the presence of coronavirus in the country.
- On 20 February, WHO Director-General Tedros Adhanom called on Tanzania to start reporting COVID-19 cases, share data, implement tried-and-tested public health measures, and prepare for vaccination.
- On 21 February, President Magufuli urged Tanzanians to take precautions against the spread of coronavirus in the country. The Ministry of Health followed up later in the day with a statement saying that people should take precautions including hand washing, eating healthy, exercising, protecting the elderly, and wearing face masks.
- On 23 February, the Czech Republic Ministry of Health announced that three Czech tourists returning from Zanzibar tested positive for COVID-19 with suspicion of the presence of the 501.V2 variant.
- On 3 March, the General Secretary of the Tanzania Episcopal Conference said that over a period of two months more than 25 priests and 60 nuns had died from various causes including respiratory challenges.
- On 10 March, a Kenyan newspaper reported that an African leader was being treated for COVID-19 at a Nairobi hospital, leading to a widespread conspiracy theory that it may be President Magufuli, who had not been seen in public since February.
- On 11 March, WHO regional director Matshidiso Moeti praised Tanzania for the action taken on 21 February but called for COVID-19 testing procedures recommended by the WHO to be followed, a return to transparency and data sharing, and a roll-out of vaccines.
- On 17 March, Vice-president Samia Suluhu Hassan announced that President Magufuli had died of heart complications. Opposition politicians claimed he had contracted COVID-19.

=== April to June 2021 ===
- On 1 April, John Nkengasong, head of the African health agency Africa CDC, said that a new variant with as many as 40 mutations had been found in Angola among travelers from Tanzania.
- On 6 April, President Samia Suluhu Hassan signalled a change in approach from her predecessor, proposing an evaluation of Tanzania's response to COVID-19, a more science-based approach and a return to regular publishing of data.
- On 8 April, ChangeTanzania published an interim report from an online survey carried out in February and March 2021. The results pointed to a rise in deaths and cases from late December, worsening in January and February.
- On 17 May, the evaluation committee that President Samia Suluhu Hassan proposed on 6 April delivered its evaluation and recommendations. According to the evaluation, Tanzania had experienced two waves of coronavirus and risked a third. The committee recommended resuming regular reporting of cases to the World Health Organization and submitting the necessary documentation for joining COVAX.
- On 29 May, Zanzibar's President Hussein Mwinyi announced that the semi-autonomous region would start importing and administering COVID-19 vaccine. Activists on the mainland urged the government to follow suit.
- On 17 June, World Health Organization representatives announced that Tanzania had applied to join COVAX.
- On 19 June, the director of prevention from the Ministry of Health warned about signs of an emerging third wave of infections in Tanzania and issued instructions to wear face masks, use sanitizer and wash hands.
- In the semi-autonomous region of Zanzibar, 390 persons tested positive between 25 June and 10 August, while 15 persons died.
- On 28 June, President Samia Suluhu Hassan referred to 100 new COVID-19 cases in Tanzania, 70 of whom in a critical state on ventilators.

=== July to September 2021 ===
- On 6 July, Zanzibar began administering the CoronaVac vaccine to frontline workers following a Chinese donation of 110,000 doses.
- On 7 July, President Samia Suluhu Hassan warned against a third wave of the virus, citing cases recently reported in Dar es Salaam, Arusha, Mwanza and many other parts of the country.
- On 10 July, Health Minister Dorothy Gwajima revealed that there had been 408 new cases of COVID-19, 284 of whom were on ventilators.
- On 14 July, Health Minister Dorothy Gwajima announced an agreement reached with COVAX to supply 300,000 vaccine doses. She also undertook to resume publication of twice-monthly COVID-19 statistics.
- By 21 July, the reported number of COVID-19 cases had risen to 682, followed by an additional increase of 176 cases over the next two days. The reported death toll rose to 29. As a consequence of the rising number of cases and deaths, new restrictions on movement and gatherings were introduced.
- The vaccination campaign in mainland Tanzania was launched on 28 July.
- By 7 August, 105,745 persons had been vaccinated. A week later, the number had risen to 207,391.
- By 8 August, the reported number of COVID-19 cases had shot up to 16,970. The reported death toll remained unchanged. A week later, the reported number of cases remained 16,970 while the reported death toll had risen to 50.
- In the semi-autonomous region of Zanzibar, 876 persons tested positive between 10 and 27 August, while the region's death toll increased to 40.
- By 28 September, the reported number of COVID-19 cases had risen to 25,647 and the reported death toll to 714.

=== October to December 2021 ===
- By 5 October, the reported number of COVID-19 cases had risen to 25,846 and the reported death toll to 719. A week later, the reported number of cases had risen to 25,957 and the reported death toll to 723.
- By 19 October, the reported number of COVID-19 cases had risen to 26,034 and the reported death toll to 724. Three days later the reported number of cases had risen to 26,154 and the reported death toll to 725.
- By 29 October, the reported number of COVID-19 cases had risen to 26,196. The reported death toll remained unchanged.
- By 5 November, the reported number of COVID-19 cases had risen to 26,208 while the reported death toll remained unchanged.
- By 12 November, the reported number of COVID-19 cases had risen to 26,227 and the reported death toll to 727.
- By 19 November, the reported number of COVID-19 cases had risen to 26,261 and the reported death toll to 730.
- By 26 November, the reported number of COVID-19 cases had risen to 26,270 while the reported death toll remained unchanged.
- By 3 December, the reported number of COVID-19 cases had risen to 26,309 and the reported death toll to 734.
- By 10 December, the reported number of COVID-19 cases had risen to 26,483 while the reported death toll remained unchanged.
- By 24 December, the reported number of COVID-19 cases stood at 29,306 and the reported death toll was 737.
- By 31 December, the reported number of COVID-19 cases stood at 30,564 and the reported death toll was 740. Modeling by WHO's Regional Office for Africa suggests that due to under-reporting, the true cumulative number of infections by the end of 2021 was around 26.3 million while the true number of COVID-19 deaths was around 33,000.

=== January to March 2022 ===
- By 7 January, the reported number of COVID-19 cases had risen to 31,395 and the reported death toll was 745.
- By 14 January, the reported number of COVID-19 cases had risen to 32,393 and the reported death toll was 753.
- By 21 January, the reported number of COVID-19 cases had risen to 32,920 and the reported death toll was 778.
- By 28 January, the reported number of COVID-19 cases had risen to 33,230 and the reported death toll was 789.
- By 4 February, the reported number of COVID-19 cases had risen to 33,436 and the reported death toll was 792.
- By 11 February, the reported number of COVID-19 cases had risen to 33,549 and the reported death toll was 796.
- By 18 February, the reported number of COVID-19 cases had risen to 33,620 and the reported death toll was 798.
- By 4 March, the reported number of COVID-19 cases had risen to 33,726 and the reported death toll was 800.
- By 11 March, the reported number of COVID-19 cases had risen to 33,773 while the reported death toll remained unchanged.
- By 18 March, the reported number of COVID-19 cases had risen to 33,797 while the reported death toll remained unchanged.
- By 25 March, the reported number of COVID-19 cases had risen to 33,815 while the reported death toll remained unchanged.

=== April to June 2022 ===
- By 8 April, the reported number of COVID-19 cases had risen to 33,851 and the reported death toll was 803.
- By 15 April, the reported number of COVID-19 cases had risen to 33,864 while the reported death toll remained unchanged.
- By 22 April, the reported number of COVID-19 cases had risen to 33,872 while the reported death toll remained unchanged.
- By 6 May, the reported number of COVID-19 cases had risen to 33,928 while the reported death toll remained unchanged.
- By 13 May, the reported number of COVID-19 cases had risen to 35,354 and the reported death toll was 840.
- By the end of June, the reported number of COVID-19 cases had risen to 35,768 while the reported death toll was 841.

=== July to September 2022 ===
- By 8 July, the reported number of COVID-19 cases had risen to 37,510 while the reported death toll remained unchanged.
- By 29 July, the reported number of COVID-19 cases had risen to 37,865 while the reported death toll remained unchanged.
- By 5 August, the reported number of COVID-19 cases had risen to 38,205 while the reported death toll remained unchanged.
- By 12 August, the reported number of COVID-19 cases had risen to 38,454 while the reported death toll remained unchanged.
- By 19 August, the reported number of COVID-19 cases had risen to 38,712 while the reported death toll remained unchanged.
- By 2 September, the reported number of COVID-19 cases had risen to 39,168 while the reported death toll had risen to 845.
- By 16 September, the reported number of COVID-19 cases had risen to 39,341 while the reported death toll remained unchanged.
- By 30 September, the reported number of COVID-19 cases had risen to 39,513 while the reported death toll remained unchanged.

=== October to December 2022 ===
- By the end of October, the reported number of COVID-19 cases had risen to 39,920 while the reported death toll remained unchanged.
- By the end of November, the reported number of COVID-19 cases had risen to 40,806 while the reported death toll remained unchanged.
- By the end of December, the reported number of COVID-19 cases had risen to 42,396 while the reported death toll remained unchanged.

=== 2023 ===
- By the end of the year the reported number of COVID-19 cases had risen to 43,223 while the reported death toll rose to 846.

== Statistics ==
=== New cases per day ===
View source data.

=== Deaths per day ===
View source data.

== See also ==
- COVID-19 pandemic in Africa
- COVID-19 pandemic by country and territory
- COVID-19 misinformation by governments
