= Mohamed Chande Othman =

Tanzanian justice and international criminal law prosecutor

The Hon. Chief Justice Mohamed Chande Othman
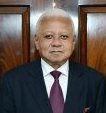

Chief Justice of the Judiciary of Tanzania
- In office 28 December 2010 – 18 January 2017
- Appointed by: Jakaya Kikwete
- Preceded by: Augustino Ramadhani
- Succeeded by: Ibrahim Hamis Juma

2rd IJA Governing Council chairman
- President: Benjamin Mkapa
- Preceded by: Ambassador Paul Rupia
- Succeeded by: John Mrosso

Personal details
- Born: 1 January 1952 (age 74) Tanganyika Territory
- Education: UDSM; Webster University Geneva; The Hague Academy of International Law
- Profession: Judge prosecutor author

Mohamed Chande Othman (born 1 January 1952) is a Tanzanian lawyer and a former Chief Justice of the Judiciary of Tanzania.

Internationally he is highly respected for his deep understanding of political, legal and other dimensions relating to International Humanitarian Law, Refugee Law, Criminal Law and Evidence, and Peacekeeping. He held various positions as expert advisor and UN prosecutor at criminal tribunals such as the UNDP Cambodia, the East Timor (UNTAET), the International Criminal Tribunal for Rwanda (ICTR), UN Human Rights Council for a) the Israel-Lebanon Armed Conflict and b) the Southern Sudan.

Currently he is head of the UN Independent Panel of Experts that examine new information on Dag Hammarskjölds death.

== Education ==
- LL.B (Hon), University of Dar es Salaam, 1974
- M.A (International Relations) Webster University, Geneva, Switzerland, 1982
- Certificate, The Hague Academy of International Law, the Netherlands, 1983

== Biography ==
=== United Nations High Level positions ===
- Head of the UN Independent Panel of Experts, charged with the assessment and examination of new information relating to the tragic death of the former UN Secretary-General Dag Hammarskjöld (since Mar. 2015)
- UN Human Rights Council's: Member of the High-Level Commission of Inquiry into the Situation in Lebanon following the Israel-Lebanon Armed Conflict (2006)
- UN Human Rights Council's: Independent Expert on the human rights situation in the Sudan (2009–2010). He visits Southern Sudan and the Abyei area.
- Prosecutor general of East Timor (UNTAET) (Jun-1999 – Jul-2002)
- Chief of Prosecutions of the International Criminal Tribunal for Rwanda (ICTR) (1998–2000)

=== Tanzania Justice Department positions ===
- Chief Justice of the Judiciary of Tanzania (Dec. 2010 – Jan. 2017 )
- High Court Judge (Dec. 2003 – Oct. 2004)
- Appeal Court Judge (Aug. 2004 – Feb. 2008)

=== Other Legal and Professional experience ===
- Member of the board of trustees of the Aga Khan University (since 2017)
- Expert advisor for the Africa Group for Justice and Accountability – Wayamo Foundation.
- Senior Legal and Justice Reform Advisor for UNDP Cambodia
- Chairman of the Presidential Commission on Inquiry on the Relocation of Pastoralists and their Livestock from Usanga Valley in Ihefu, Mbarali District, Tanzania
- Public Prosecutor for the Bank of Tanzania
- Working with the International Federation of the Red Cross and Red Crescent Societies
- Co-founder of the Sidéco Group Ltd., International Development and Trade Corporation in Geneva (1983)

== Publications ==
- Accountability for International Humanitarian law Violations: The Case of Rwanda and East Timor, Springer Publishers, Heidelberg, Germany, 2005
- 'The Framework of Prosecutions and the Court System in East Timor' in New Approaches in International Criminal Justice, Freiburg im Breisgau, Germany, 2003
- "Defense Practices and the Khmer Rouge Tribunal", in Bohlander, M, Boed, R, Wilsn, R.J, (Eds.) Defense in International Criminal Proceedings, Transitional Publishers Inc., N.Y, 2006
- The Protection of Refugee Witnesses by the International Criminal Tribunal for Rwanda, International Journal of Refugee Law, Volume 14, No. 4, May 2003
- The Gulf Wars and Termination of Captivity for Prisoners of War, Revue de Droit International des Sciences Diplomatiques et Politiques (The International Law Review) Jan-Mars 1993, 11–36, Geneva, 1993

== See also ==
- Chief Justice of Tanzania
