= Philip Mpango =

11th Vice President of Tanzania

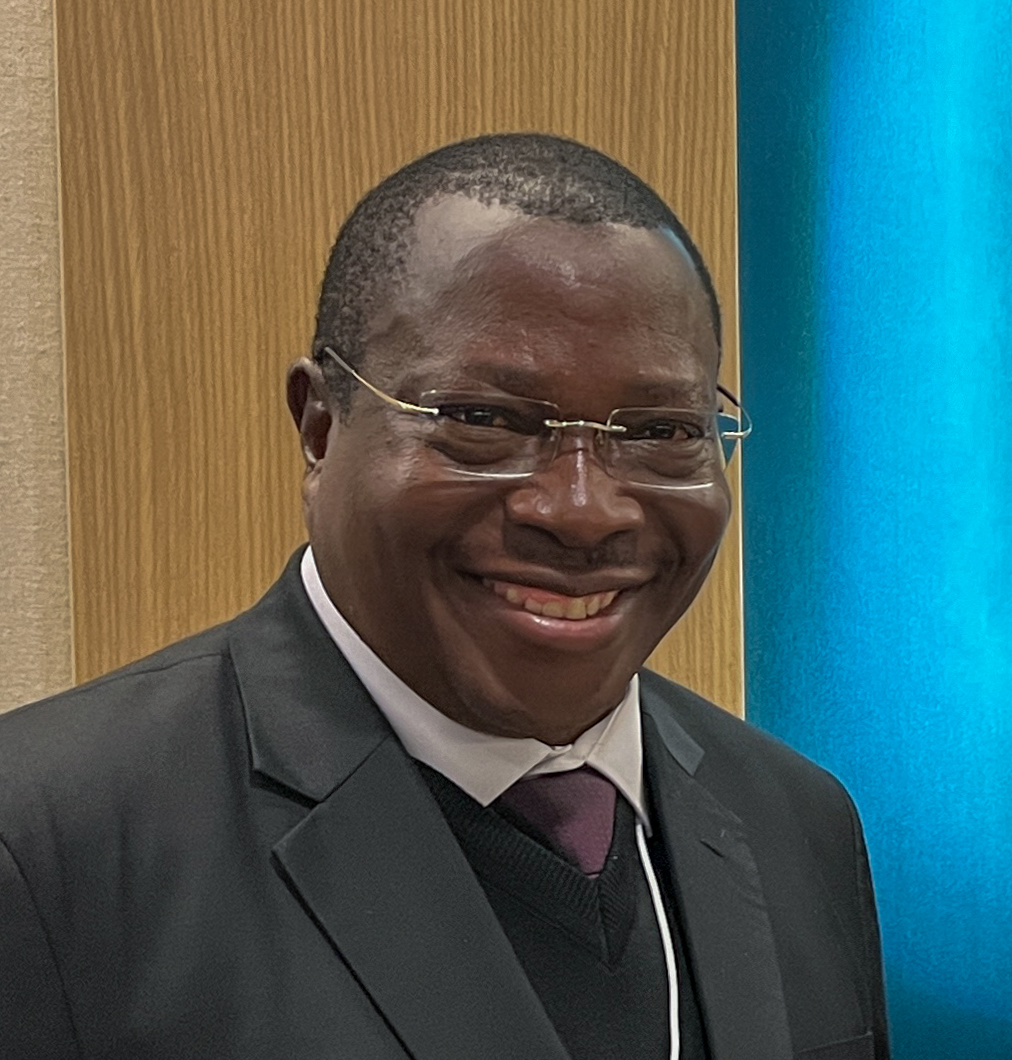
- Mpango in 2024

11th Vice-President of Tanzania
- In office 31 March 2021 – 3 November 2025
- President: Samia Suluhu
- Preceded by: Samia Suluhu
- Succeeded by: Emmanuel Nchimbi

15th Minister of Finance
- In office November 2015 – 30 March 2021
- President: John Magufuli; Samia Suluhu
- Succeeded by: Mwigulu Nchemba

Member of the Parliament of Tanzania
- In office 2015–2021
- Appointed by: John Magufuli
- Constituency: Nominated (2015–2020); Buhighwe (2020–2021)

Personal details
- Born: Philip Isdor Mpango; 14 July 1957 (age 69) Buhigwe District, Kigoma Region, Tanganyika Territory
- Party: Chama Cha Mapinduzi
- Spouse: Mbonimpaye Mpango
- Education: University of Dar es Salaam

Philip Isdor Mpango (born 14 July 1957) is a Tanzanian economist and politician who served as the Vice-President of the United Republic of Tanzania from 2021 to 2025.

He was sworn into office on 31 March 2021, following unanimous consent of the Parliament of Tanzania, and having been nominated by President Samia Suluhu on 30 March 2021. Before that, he served as the Minister of Finance and Planning in the Tanzanian Cabinet, from March 2015 until 30 March 2021.

== Early life and education ==
Mpango was born on 14 July 1957 in Tanzania's Kigoma Region. After attending primary and middle school locally, he transferred to Ihungo High School in Bukoba, where he completed his A-Level education, graduating with the equivalent of a high school diploma.

Mpango studied at the University of Dar es Salaam, earning a Bachelor of Arts degree, a Master of Arts degree, and a Doctor of Philosophy degree, all in Economics. He did some of his PhD course work at Lund University in Sweden.

== Early career ==
Mpango previously held positions as the acting commissioner general of the Tanzania Revenue Authority (TRA), the executive secretary in the President's Office (Planning Commission), the deputy permanent secretary at the Ministry of Finance & Economic Affairs, the personal assistant to the president (economic affairs), the head of the President's Economic Advisory Unit, and as a senior economist for the World Bank.

== Political career ==
Mpango was nominated by president John Magufuli to serve as a member of the Tanzanian parliament. The constitution allows the president to nominate up to ten members of parliament.

On 23 December 2015, Magufuli appointed Mpango as Minister of Finance and Planning. (Note: Due to his position as Tanzania's finance minister, Mpango has also held a number of positions ex officio, including as a member of the Joint World Bank-IMF Development Committee, as an ex-officio member of the board of governors of the Multilateral Investment Guarantee Agency (MIGA), a member of the World Bank Group, ex officio member of the board of governors (from 2015 until 2021) and as an ex-officio member of the board of governors of the Trade and Development Bank from 2015 until 2021. He also served as an ex officio member of the governing council of the East African Development Bank (EADB), during his tenure as Finance Minister of Tanzania.) In 2020, Magufuli reappointed him to the office. Mpango has been credited with improving the Tanzanian economy by an average of 6 to 7 percent during his five years as finance minister.

During the coronavirus pandemic, after Seif Sharif Hamad, First Vice President of the semi-autonomous region of Zanzibar, had died after contracting the virus, and after President Magufuli had admitted that Tanzania had a coronavirus problem, Mpango "appeared coughing and gasping at a press conference" that was held to address rumors that he had died of the coronavirus, shocking many and drawing widespread condemnation.

Magufuli's subsequent death was announced on 17 March 2021, resulting in Vice-President Samia Suluhu Hassan being sworn in as his successor on 19 March 2021, and her nomination on 30 March 2021 of Mpango to the vice-presidential office that she had vacated.

At the time he was confirmed for the position of vice-president, in March 2021, he was the incumbent MP for the constituency of Buhigwe in Kigoma Region of northwest Tanzania. According to the laws of the country, once he was appointed VP, he ceased to be an MP and his parliamentary seat fell vacant. Mpango has stated that he planned to combat corruption and continue implementing major infrastructure projects, including a new standard gauge railway.

In May 2025, Mpango announced that he was retiring from office.

== Other activities ==
- African Development Bank (AfDB), Ex-Officio Member of the Board of Governors (2015–2021)
