= Tundu Lissu =

Tanzanian lawyer and politician (born 1968)

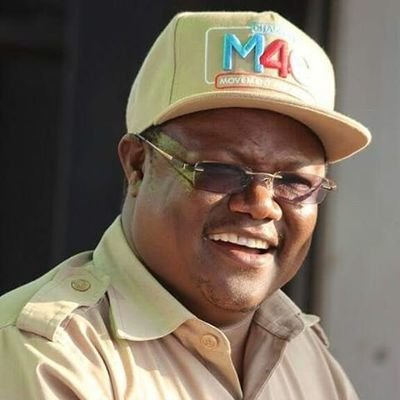
- Lissu in 2015

Chairman of the Party for Democracy and Progress
- Incumbent
- Assumed office 21 January 2025

Member of Parliament for Singida East
- In office October 2010 – July 2020
- Succeeded by: Miraji Jumanne Mtaturu

Personal details
- Born: Tundu Antiphas Mughwai Lissu; 20 January 1968 (age 58) Ikungi District, Tanzania
- Party: NCCR-Mageuzi (1992–1996); CHADEMA (2004–current)
- Spouse: Alicia Magabe
- Children: 2
- Education: Uni. of Dar es Salaam (LL.B); University of Warwick (LL.M)

Tundu Antiphas Mughwai Lissu (born 20 January 1968) is a Tanzanian lawyer, CHADEMA politician, anti-corruption activist and former Member of Parliament for Singida East constituency between 2010 and 2020. He is the current chairman of CHADEMA, Tanzania's leading opposition political party.

He is also the former president of Tanganyika Law Society (TLS), the bar association of mainland Tanzania.

== Early life and education ==
Lissu was born in Mahambe village in Ikungi District, Tanzania. He attended Ilboru Secondary School in Arusha and graduated in 1983.

== Career ==
=== Legal career and corruption critic ===
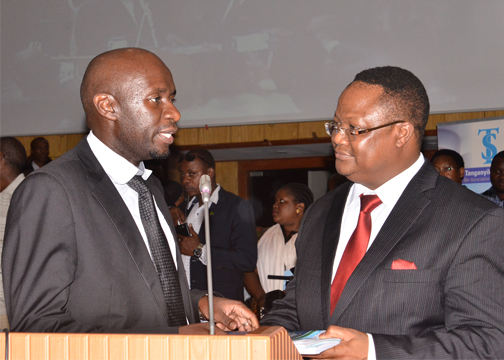
Tundu Lissu (right) chatting with former president of TLS John Seka, during the Tanganyika Law Society (TLS) Annual Conference and General Meeting of 2016 in Arusha

Lissu began his career in public interest advocacy. He worked with the Lawyers Environmental Action Team (LEAT) and the World Resources Institute as a lawyer and worked on various land rights issues with regards to protected areas and mining.

Over the years Lissu has built reputations as a prominent lawyer, fierce opposition figure and outspoken government critic, especially with his repeated confrontations with the government under President John Magufuli's tenure in the country. Lissu was responsible for the research and preparation of the document that revealed the involvement of the state's high-ranking officials in plundering of public funds, known as the 'List of Shame'. The politician was arrested at least six times in 2017 alone, accused of insulting the president and disturbing public order, among other charges. On 23 August 2017, his home was searched by the police after he was arrested and questioned over allegations of sedition and insulting President Magufuli, calling him a 'petty dictator'. His arrest came after he revealed to the public that a plane bought for the national carrier Air Tanzania had been impounded in Canada over unpaid government debts.

=== Political career ===
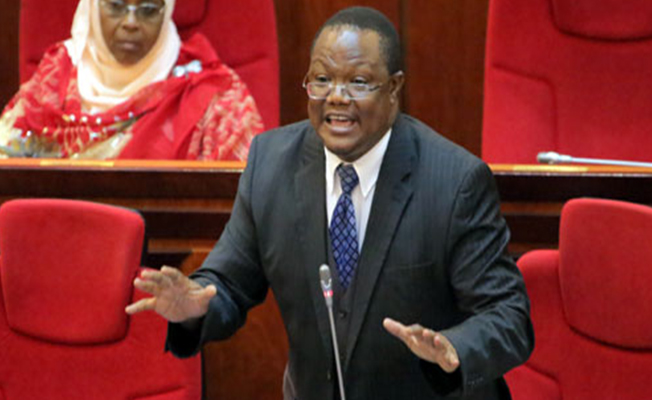
Tundu Lissu addressing the parliament of Tanzania in Dodoma

Lissu entered politics in 2010 by winning the member of parliament seat for Singida East.

==== Assassination attempt and exile from Tanzania ====
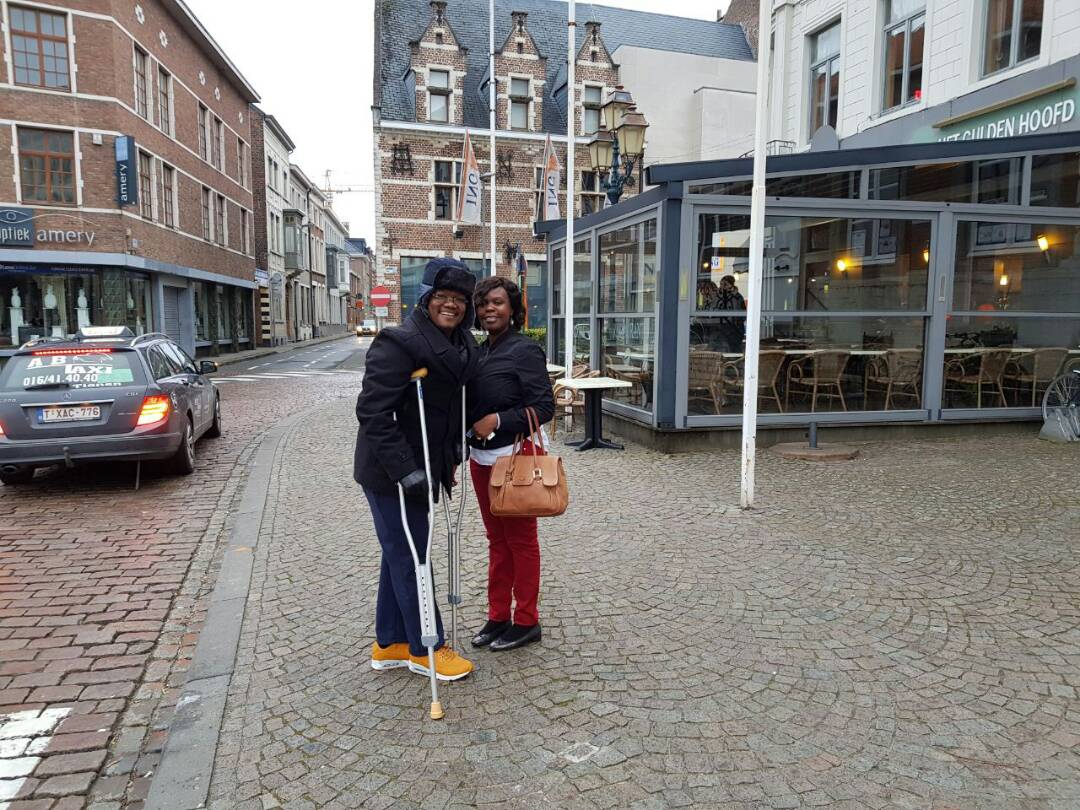
Tundu Lissu with wife Alicia in Belgium, where he was undergoing treatment and rehabilitation

In the afternoon of 7 September 2017 during a parliamentary session break, Lissu, whilst in his car, was shot multiple times and seriously injured by unknown assailants in the parking lot of his parliamentary residence in Area D, Dodoma. This happened a few weeks after Lissu indicated publicly that certain people instructed by IGP Sirro had been stalking him for weeks.

Lissu received emergency treatment for some hours at Dodoma General Hospital before, in fear of his safety, was air-lifted to Aga Khan Hospital in Nairobi, Kenya, where he was hospitalized for months before being flown to Belgium to undergo further treatment and rehabilitation. He was hospitalized at the Leuven University Hospital in Gasthuisberg, where he reportedly underwent 19 operations by mid-March 2018.

Lissu's party officials openly addressed their concerns to the public and to President Magufuli, who was then chairman of the ruling party CCM, that the attempt on Lissu's life was politically motivated and just another retaliation on the lawmaker's repeated run-ins with the government. While President Magufuli condemned the attack, he was "shocked" and "saddened" by the shooting and was praying for Lissu's "quick recovery", several Tanzanian politicians have commented about the attack, with Chadema Chairman Freeman Mbowe and opposition figure Zitto Kabwe hinting on the necessity of having a foreign body lead the investigation on the attack. No one was convicted for the attack on his life.

==== Return to Tanzania ====
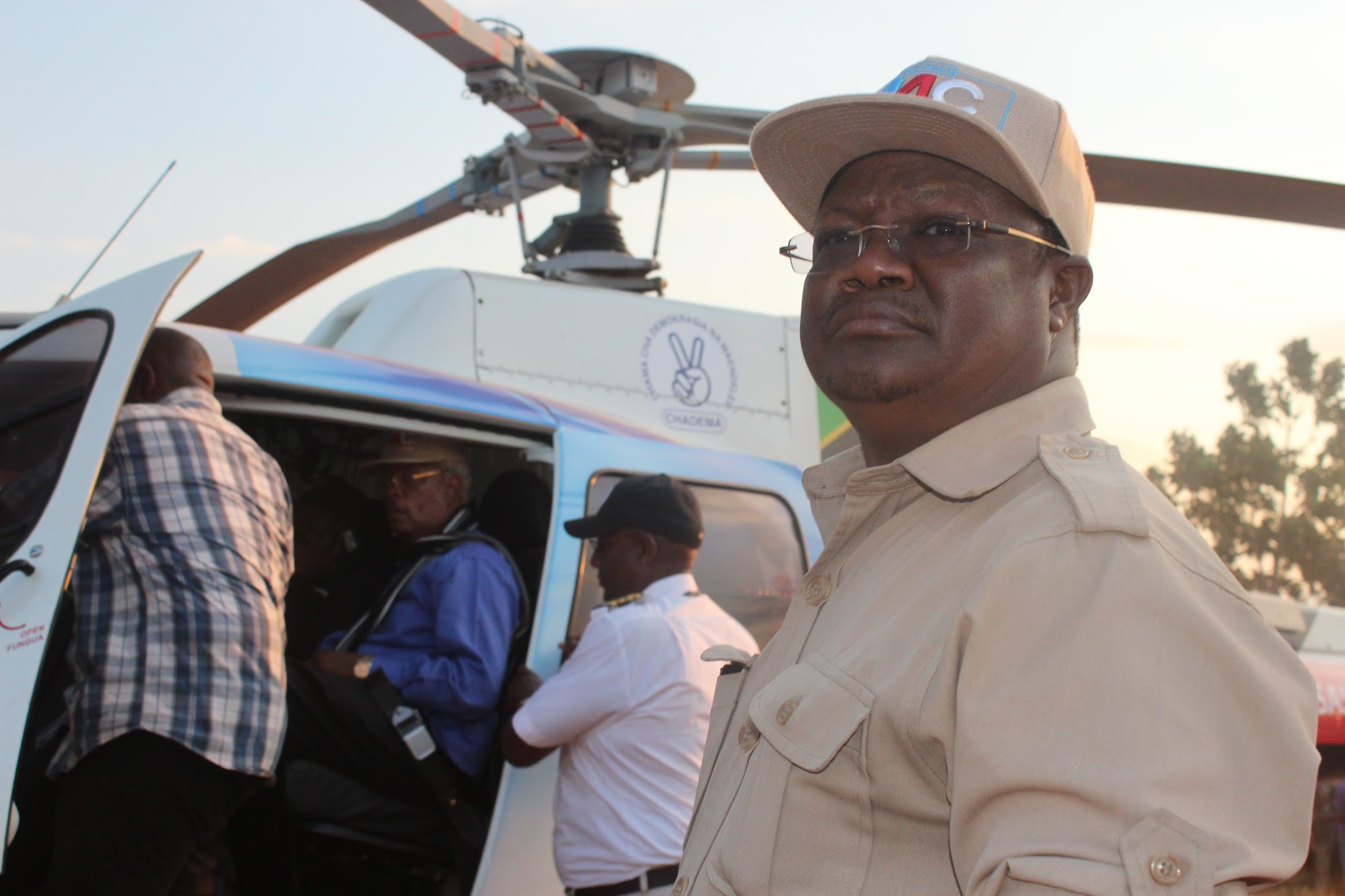
Lissu in Kibaigwa, Dodoma, during the 2015 general elections campaign

On 27 July 2020, Lissu returned to Tanzania after three years in exile to contest in the general elections.

In January 2023, Lissu announced that he had returned to Tanzania after five years of exile in Belgium. He was arrested on separate occasions in August and September 2024. On 22 January 2025, he was elected the chairman of Chadema, beating the incumbent Freeman Mbowe, by a close 31 votes.

On 9 April 2025, Lissu was arrested on charges of incitement and treason after calling for electoral reforms at a rally in Mbinga. On 12 April, he was disqualified from participating in the 2025 Tanzanian general election. While in detention, he went on a hunger strike to demand that he be allowed to attend court hearings physically rather than online. On 18 May, his lawyer, Kenyan politician Martha Karua, was arrested and deported upon arrival at Julius Nyerere International Airport in Dar es Salaam to represent him in court. Due to his prison authorities blocking him from meeting with his lawyers, Lissu was allowed to represent himself in court following a petition on 16 June. On 6 November 2026, Lissu was sentenced to four years in prison for incitement; he was acquitted of treason.

In October 2022, the EPP Group in the European Parliament nominated Tundu Lissu, who had been in detention for over 500 days at that point, for the Sakharov Prize for Freedom of Thought.

== Presidential aspirations ==
Lissu returned to Tanzania from exile to be able to contest the Tanzanian general elections. He was chosen as CHADEMA's presidential candidate on 3 August 2020 and challenged Magufuli for president in the 2020 Tanzanian general election.
