= Ibrahim Hamis Juma =

Retired Chief Justice of Tanzania

Hon. Prof. Ibrahim Hamis Juma

8th Chief Justice of the Judiciary of Tanzania
- In office 10 September 2017 – 15 June 2025
- Appointed by: John Pombe Magufuli
- Preceded by: Mohamed Chande Othman
- Succeeded by: George Mcheche Masaju

Personal details
- Born: 15 June 1958 (age 68) Musoma, Tanganyika
- Education: UDSM; SOAS, University of London; University of Lund; Ghent University
- Occupation: Chancellor- The University of Dodoma
- Profession: Judge

Ibrahim Hamis Juma (born 15 June 1958) is a Tanzanian lawyer and retired Chief Justice of the Judiciary of Tanzania.

== Biography ==
He was appointed a High Court judge by President Jakaya Kikwete in 2008 before he was promoted to serve in the Court of Appeal in 2012. He also served as the chairman of Law Reform Commission of Tanzania (LRCT). He was appointed by President John Magufuli in 10 September 2017. Prior to his appointment as a Chief Justice, he served as Acting Chief Justice and as a justice in the Court of Appeal.

== Tenure as Chief Justice (2017–2025) ==
=== Reforms and Modernization ===
Prof. Juma launched a digital transformation of the judiciary, including:

- Championed access to justice and access to legal information via Tanzania Legal Information Institute (TanzLII).
- Implementing electronic case filing and e-court systems.
- Introducing AI-assisted transcription tools to improve efficiency in court proceedings.

=== Infrastructure Development ===
He oversaw the construction of a new judicial complex in Dodoma, equipped with ICT systems and space for all national judicial offices. Additionally, over 40 residential buildings for judges were built during his tenure.

During his tenure, Prof. Juma oversaw a major national program to expand judicial infrastructure, supported jointly by the World Bank and the Government of Tanzania.

Under the World Bank–funded Citizen-Centric Judicial Modernization Project (CCJMP), the judiciary constructed 18 subordinate courts and initiated the rollout of Integrated Justice Centres (IJCs). By 2024, six IJCs had been completed and nine more were under construction, making a total of 15 justice centres aimed at offering multiple services in one location.

In a public address, Juma announced that 60 additional primary courts were being constructed with World Bank support and 12 more funded directly by the Tanzanian government. Another 14 district courts were built in new administrative zones such as Chamwino, and IJCs were expanded into regions including Geita, Simiyu, and Ruvuma.

=== Independence and Legal Heritage ===
He advocated for judicial independence and integrity, urging the bench to resist political interference.

Juma also promoted the documentation of Tanzania’s judicial history, including the biographies of prominent judges.

== Retirement ==
Juma retired on 15 June 2025. He was succeeded by George Masaju, who pledged to continue the modernization reforms. President Samia Suluhu Hassan praised him for “exemplary leadership”.
