= Samia Suluhu Hassan =

President of Tanzania since 2021

Her Excellency Samia Suluhu Hassan
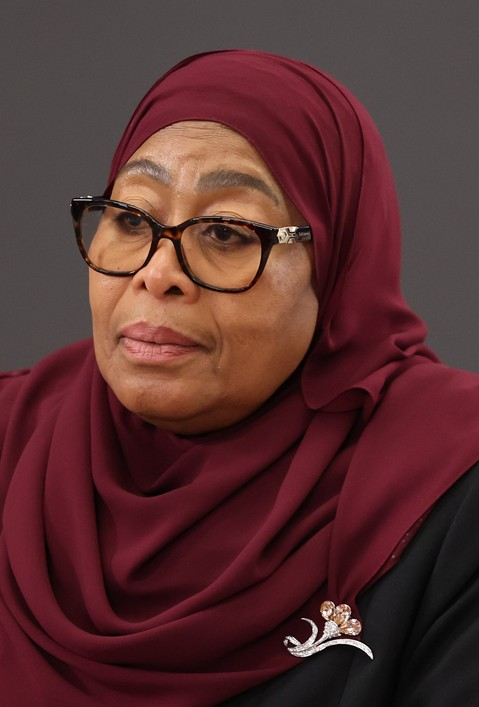
- Suluhu in 2026

6th President of Tanzania
- Incumbent
- Assumed office 19 March 2021
- Prime Minister: Kassim Majaliwa; Mwigulu Nchemba
- Vice President: Philip Mpango; Emmanuel Nchimbi; Deogratius Ndejembi
- Preceded by: John Magufuli

Third Vice Chairperson of the African Union
- Incumbent
- Assumed office 15 February 2025
- President: João Lourenço

10th Vice-President of Tanzania
- In office 5 November 2015 – 19 March 2021
- President: John Magufuli
- Preceded by: Mohamed Gharib Bilal
- Succeeded by: Philip Mpango

Minister of State for Union Affairs in the Vice President's Office
- In office November 2010 – November 2015
- President: Jakaya Kikwete
- Preceded by: Muhammed Seif Khatib
- Succeeded by: January Makamba

Member of Parliament for Makunduchi
- In office November 2010 – July 2015
- Succeeded by: Ameir Timbe

Minister of Tourism, Trade and Investment of Zanzibar
- In office 2005–2010
- President: Amani Karume
- Preceded by: Mussa Silima
- Succeeded by: Said Ali Mbarouk

Personal details
- Born: 27 January 1960 (age 66) Makunduchi, Sultanate of Zanzibar
- Party: Chama Cha Mapinduzi
- Spouse: Hafidh Ameir Hassan (m. 1978; died 2026)
- Children: 4, including Wanu Hafidh Ameir
- Education: Mzumbe University (AdvDip); University of Manchester (PGDip); Open University of Tanzania (MSc)

Samia Suluhu Hassan (/sɑːmiɑː suluhu hɑːssɑːn/ SAH-mee-ah soo-LOO-hoo HA-san; born 27 January 1960) is a Tanzanian politician and the sixth president of Tanzania, serving since 19 March 2021. She is the first woman to serve in the position and previously served as vice-president of Tanzania from 2015 to 2021, from which she ascended to the presidency following the death of her predecessor, John Magufuli.

A native of Zanzibar, Suluhu served as a minister in the semi-autonomous region from 2000 to 2010. She then served as the Member of Parliament for the Makunduchi constituency from 2010 to 2015 and was the Minister of State in the Vice-President's Office for Union Affairs from 2010 to 2015. In 2014, she was elected as the vice-chairperson of the Constituent Assembly tasked with the drafting of the country's new constitution. Suluhu became Tanzania's first female vice-president following the 2015 general election, after being elected on the Chama Cha Mapinduzi (CCM) ticket with Magufuli. Suluhu and Magufuli were re-elected to a second term in 2020.

As president, Suluhu implemented policies intended to limit the spread of the COVID-19 pandemic in Tanzania, which Magufuli had denied was a serious issue. Other focuses of her presidency have included the expansion of infrastructure and the globalisation of the Tanzanian economy through investors and tourism.

In the 2025 Tanzanian general election, her CCM government banned the main opposition party, Chadema, from taking part; the leader of the party, Tundu Lissu, was charged with treason and arrested. The election was marred with electoral violence and irregularities, which led to protests. Early in her presidency she had a positive image as a reformer, but by 2024, ahead of the October 2025 election, she dropped the reformist image. As of 2026, her rule is increasingly viewed by scholars, independent right observers and media as being authoritarian, with Tanzania sliding deeper into a dictatorial-style of governance. (Note: Sources:)

== Early life and education ==
Suluhu was born in the Sultanate of Zanzibar on 27 January 1960 to a teacher and his wife. Four years later, Zanzibar unified with Tanganyika to form the nation of Tanzania. She completed her secondary education in 1977, and she began working as an office clerk. In 1978, she married agriculturalist Hafidh Ameir Hassan. They had three sons and one daughter before Ameir died in 2026. Their daughter Wanu Hafidh Ameir, born 1982, the couple's second child, became a member of the Zanzibar House of Representatives.

Suluhu pursued a number of short courses on a part-time basis. In 1986, she graduated from the Institute of Development Management (present-day Mzumbe University) with an advanced diploma in public administration. Between 1992 and 1994, she attended the University of Manchester and earned a postgraduate diploma in economics. In 2015, she obtained her MSc in Community Economic Development via a joint programme between the Open University of Tanzania and Southern New Hampshire University.

In 1988, Suluhu became a development officer with the regional Zanzibar government. She became a project manager at the World Food Programme. In the 1990s, she was put in charge of a body that regulates non-governmental organizations in Zanzibar.

=== Personal life ===
Suluhu's husband, agriculturalist Hafidh Ameir Hassan, whom she married in 1978, died of heart disease in Zanzibar on 7 September 2026. He was buried at the couple's private residence in the coastal village of Kizimkazi, Unguja South Region, Zanzibar, also on 7 September 2026.

== Political career ==
In 2000, Suluhu became a special seat member of the Zanzibar House of Representatives with the Chama Cha Mapinduzi (CCM) party, where she was appointed Zanzibar's Minister for Youth Employment, Women and Children. While in this position, she ended the prohibition on new mothers returning to school. She was the only high-ranking woman minister in the cabinet and was treated less seriously by her male colleagues because she was a woman. She was re-elected in 2005 and was appointed as Minister for Tourism and Trade Investment.

In 2010, Suluhu sought election to the National Assembly, standing in the parliamentary constituency of Makunduchi and winning by more than 80%. President Jakaya Kikwete appointed her as the Minister of State for Union Affairs. In 2014, she was elected as the Vice-Chairperson of the Constituent Assembly tasked with drafting the country's new constitution.

Suluhu was the vice-presidential candidate for the CCM in the 2015 general election, along with presidential candidate John Magufuli. She was an unexpected choice, as several more prominent and influential politicians were passed on for the role. She was the first female running mate in the party's history. They won the election, and they were sworn in on 5 November 2015. Suluhu became the first female Vice-President of Tanzania. A dispute emerged between Magufuli and Suluhu in 2016 in which questions of her loyalty were raised, but Suluhu then made public statements in support of Magufuli. Magufuli and Suluhu were re-elected in the 2020 general election, though the victory was called into question after allegations of electoral fraud by independent observers.

== President of Tanzania ==
=== Ascension and swearing in ===
On 17 March 2021, Suluhu announced that Magufuli had died after a long illness; Magufuli had not been seen in public since late February. She was sworn in on 19 March 2021 to serve the remainder of his second term. Opposition leaders had expressed concern about a possible vacuum when 18 March passed without Suluhu being sworn in. Out of public view, there was an effort by factions of the party to prevent her from becoming president, and she was the last of the senior government officials to be briefed on Magufuli's death. Immediately after being sworn in, Suluhu inspected troops at a military parade in her honour. In her first statement as president, she declared three weeks of mourning for Magufuli's death.

Suluhu chose Minister of Finance Philip Mpango as her vice-president. To strengthen her position in the government, she dismissed Magufuli's closest allies, including Bashiru Ally and Palamagamba Kabudi. She also restored the positions of people who had been removed by Magufuli, such as January Makamba, Nape Nnauye, and Abdulrahman Kinana. Suluhu expanded her influence over the party by aligning with former president Jakaya Kikwete.

Upon her swearing-in, Suluhu became Tanzania's first female president and the second Zanzibari to hold the post, after Ali Hassan Mwinyi. She became one of only two serving female heads of state in Africa at the time she was sworn in, alongside Ethiopia's Sahle-Work Zewde, who held only a ceremonial role. She was the only female head of government in Africa after she was sworn in.

The October 2025 election, which consolidated Samia Suluhu Hassan's power with 97.66% of the vote, was marred by accusations of massive fraud and a severe repression of opposition protests. The African Union's observer mission stated the election "did not comply" with regional or international standards, citing irregularities and the internet shutdown.

Numerous human rights organizations accused her government of authorizing the use of live ammunition against civilians. The main opposition party, Chadema, claimed it had documented up to 1,000 people killed, labelling the acts as crimes against humanity. The government denied these claims; while President Hassan acknowledged deaths occurred, her government called the opposition's death toll "hugely exaggerated".

=== Presidential administration ===
A map highlighting the countries Suluhu has visited while president

The COVID-19 pandemic was ongoing when Suluhu became president. She reversed the denialist position on the COVID-19 pandemic in Tanzania held by Magufuli, and she entered Tanzania into the COVAX program to begin distribution of COVID-19 vaccines in July 2021. Mandatory 14-day quarantines for travellers entering Tanzania from countries with cases of new variants of SARS-CoV-2 were imposed. Suluhu permitted embassies and other international organisations to import vaccines into the country to vaccinate foreign nationals for their Tanzanian day-to-day work, aided by the Ministry of Health.

Since becoming president, Suluhu has pledged to see that the flagship development projects that were initiated by Magufuli are completed on time. She has also approved new development projects. Projects that she prioritised include establishing a railway line, building a hydropower plant, and making electricity and clean water available in rural Tanzania.

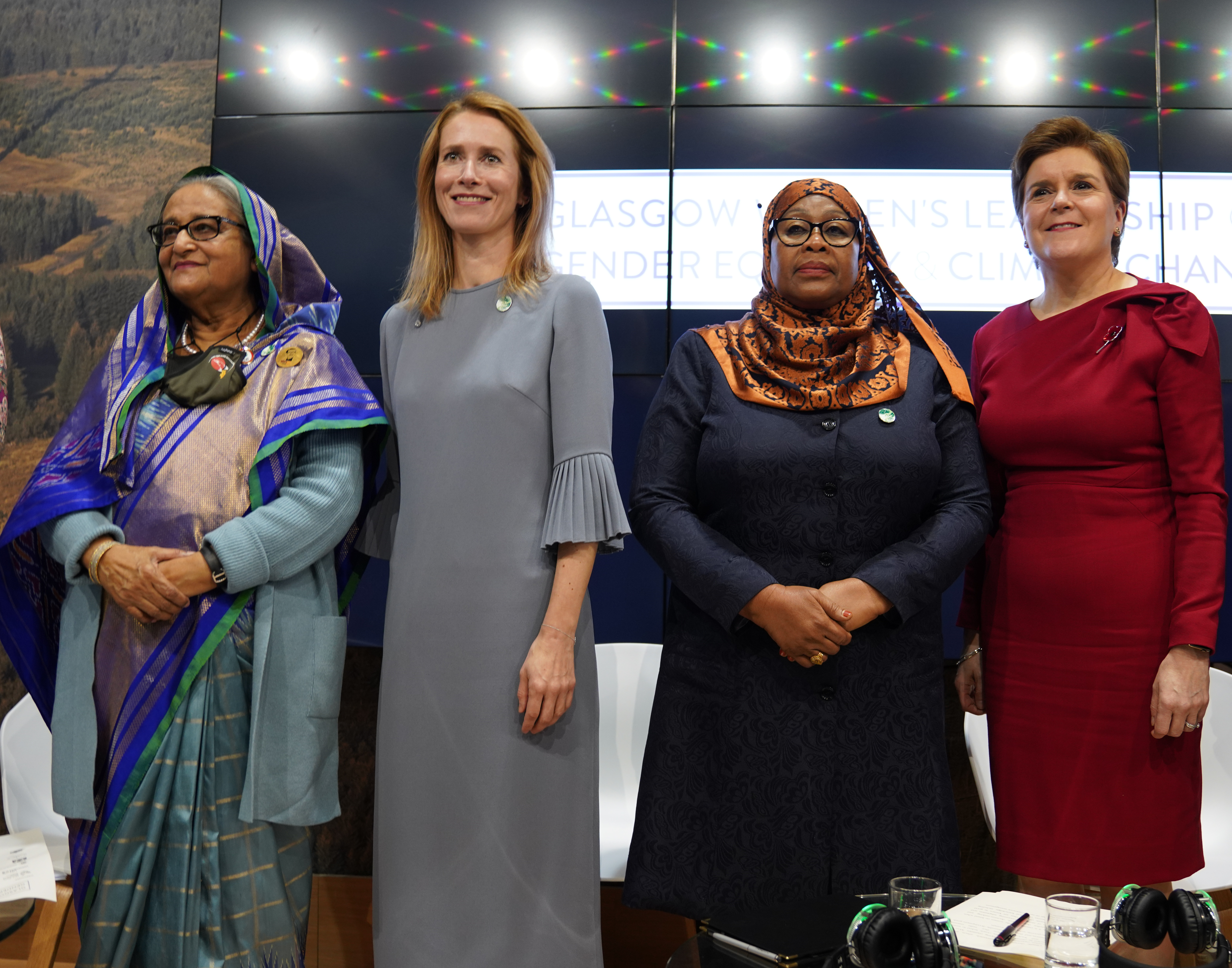
Suluhu with Bangladeshi Prime Minister Sheikh Hasina, Estonian Prime Minister Kaja Kallas and Scottish First Minister Nicola Sturgeon at the UN's COP26, November 2021

Suluhu filmed a movie, The Royal Tour, with journalist and filmmaker Peter Greenberg in early 2021 with the intention of promoting tourism and getting investors interested in Tanzania. Suluhu became the fifth African woman to address the United Nations General Assembly in September 2021. She reorganised her presidential cabinet in January 2022 to ensure that it was populated by loyalists, while she gradually removed those who had served under Magufuli.

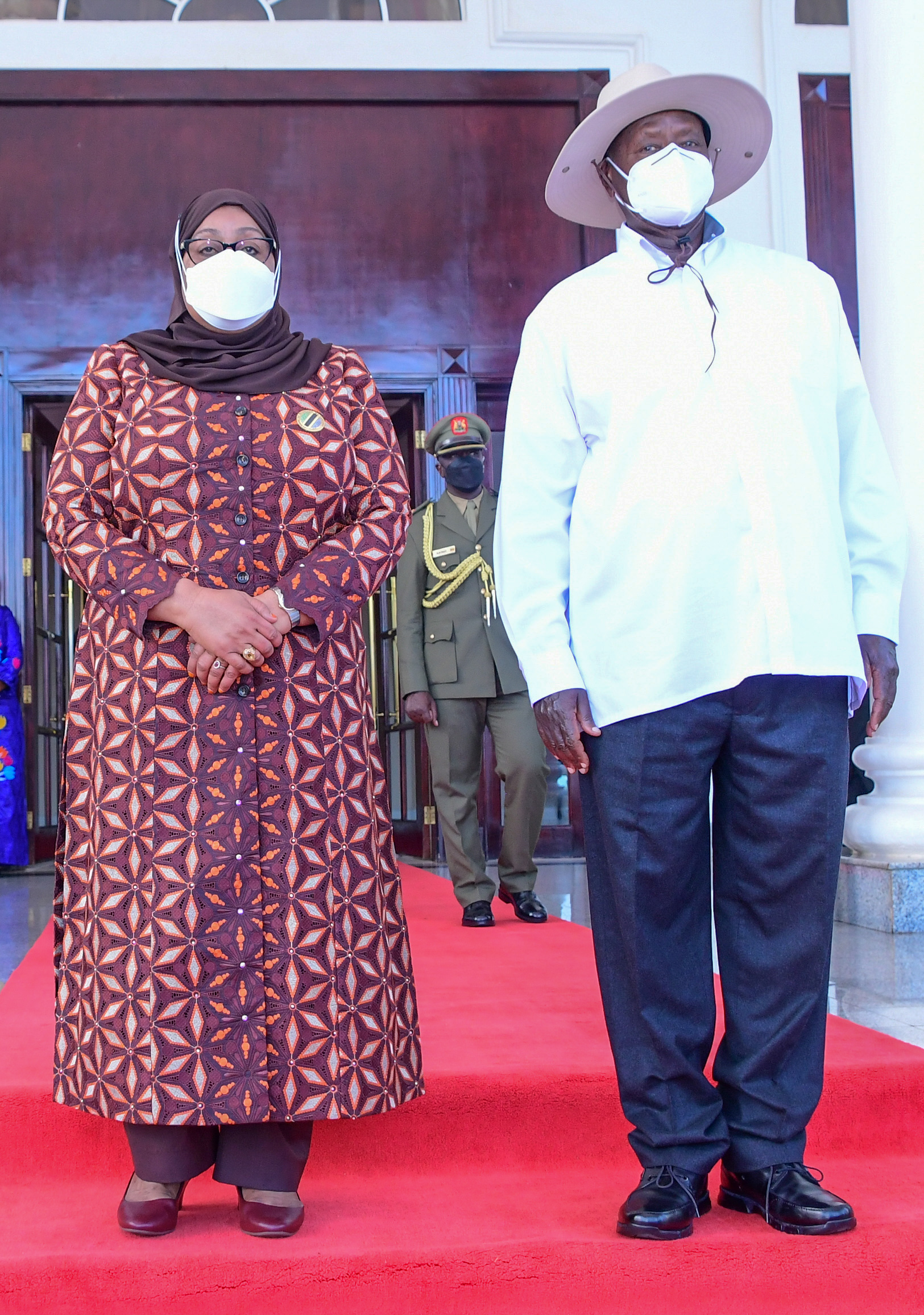
Suluhu with Ugandan President Yoweri Museveni, 2022

Suluhu adopted a more internationalist approach rather than the isolationism of her predecessor, and she has sought to entice both investors and tourists. In 2022, she attended the Expo 2020 to promote Tanzanian products and opportunities which led her to sign a business partnership deal with Dubai. Suluhu took a neutral stance on the Russian invasion of Ukraine, saying that they should negotiate peace and that "we don't know why they are fighting".

In 2022, Suluhu was named among the top 100 most influential people in the world by American magazine Time. By 2024, she began appealing to the supporters of her predecessor by appointing Magufuli loyalists like Doto Biteko and Paul Makonda to government positions.

On 20 September 2023, Suluhu joined the Advisory Board of the Global Center on Adaptation following the Africa Climate Summit in Nairobi, Kenya.

=== Style of governance ===
Writers for France 24, The New York Times, and New Internationalist have all described Suluhu as "soft-spoken". Suluhu herself has referenced her quiet demeanour. Al-Jazeera correspondent Catherine Wambua-Soi described a collaborative nature in Suluhu's approach to government, saying that she consults her advisors instead of making unilateral decisions. BBC News cited a comparison to Magufili's predecessor, Jakaya Kikwete, who similarly engaged in diplomacy with the opposition instead of repression. Suluhu is sometimes known as Mama Samia, a name meant to indicate reverence. Suluhu has emphasised her femininity as part of her presidency, describing it as a factor in her attempts to create a culture of political unity.

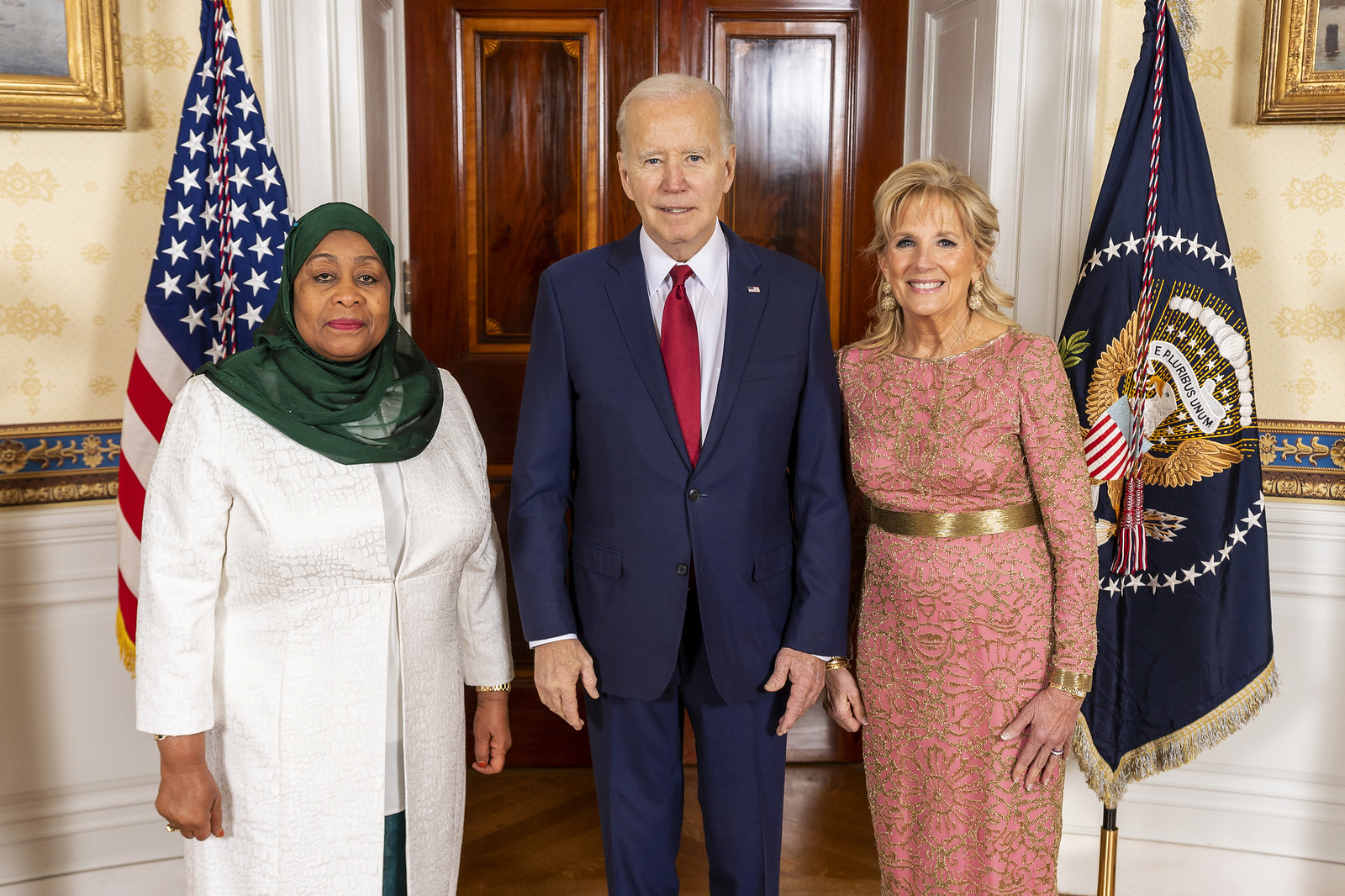
Suluhu with US President Joe Biden in Washington, D.C., December 2022

When she became president, Suluhu was seen by the public and outside observers as a more democratically-inclined alternative to Magufuli, who had developed a reputation as an authoritarian. After taking office, Suluhu took measures to increase freedom of speech and freedom of the press to reverse Magufuli's policies and to improve Tanzania's global image. These included releasing political prisoners, meeting with opposition leaders, and reopening newspapers that were shut down for criticising the government. She also lifted a ban on political rallies in 2023, which her predecessor had implemented to stifle the opposition.

==== Drift to authoritarian tendencies ====
Samia Suluhu Hassan's style of governance is described by observers as having taken an authoritarian drift, particularly marked by the severe repression of the post-election unrest in October 2025. According to UN reports, the security forces' response to the protests resulted in hundreds of deaths, injuries, and mass detentions, amid allegations of live ammunition being used against civilians. Observers warn that this repression and pattern of abuses could, subject to investigation and legal assessment, amount to mass atrocities or crimes against humanity.

Opposition leaders and activists have been arrested under her tenure and at least one has been found dead; protests have erupted against the alleged disappearing and killings of government critics by the security forces, leading to more arrests. The Economist wrote in 2025 that Tanzania was experiencing "state brutality", with "scores" of opposition figures disappearing.

Suluhu has faced criticism for not challenging many authoritarian laws and practices. She chose not to seek widely demanded amendments to the constitution when she took office, citing the poor state of the economy. Following the release of Freeman Mbowe and his immediate conversation with Suluhu, his first appearance days later was at the International Women's Day event in Iringa in 2022. This caused critics to accuse Suluhu of releasing Mbowe on condition of support for Western feminist policies. Suluhu's meetings and reconciliation with opposition leaders have conversely received criticism within her own party.

The government's crackdown following the October 2025 election culminated in Hassan being designated "Tyrant of the Year 2025" by the advocacy organization Index on Censorship in January 2026, following a public vote. The designation was attributed to the scale of the post-election repression and the government's use of a nationwide internet shutdown to restrict information. Specific reports from Amnesty International highlighted atrocities in Mbeya and Mwanza, including allegations of security forces entering private residences to conduct extrajudicial executions and the subsequent use of mass graves to dispose of casualties. These events led human rights observers to describe her tenure as a definitive departure from her initial "pro-democracy" rhetoric.

=== Reelection campaign ===
In January 2025, CCM nominated Suluhu as its presidential candidate for the 2025 Tanzanian general election in October. On 27 August, the Independent National Electoral commission (INEC) approved her candidacy, soon after opposition candidate Luhaga Mpina was barred from running by the INEC and the Registrar of Political Parties. The major opposition party Chadema was also barred from participation in the election. Protests were held in October, endorsed by Mange Kimambi, causing a military crackdown and Internet connectivity has been intermittent. In November, it was announced that she had won the election with 97% of the vote. She was sworn into office on 3 November at a ceremony that was closed to the public.

Suluhu will not be eligible for a second full term in 2030. Under the Tanzanian Constitution, if a vice-president ascends to the presidency with more than three years remaining in the term, they are only eligible for one full five-year term.

== Honours, awards and recognition ==
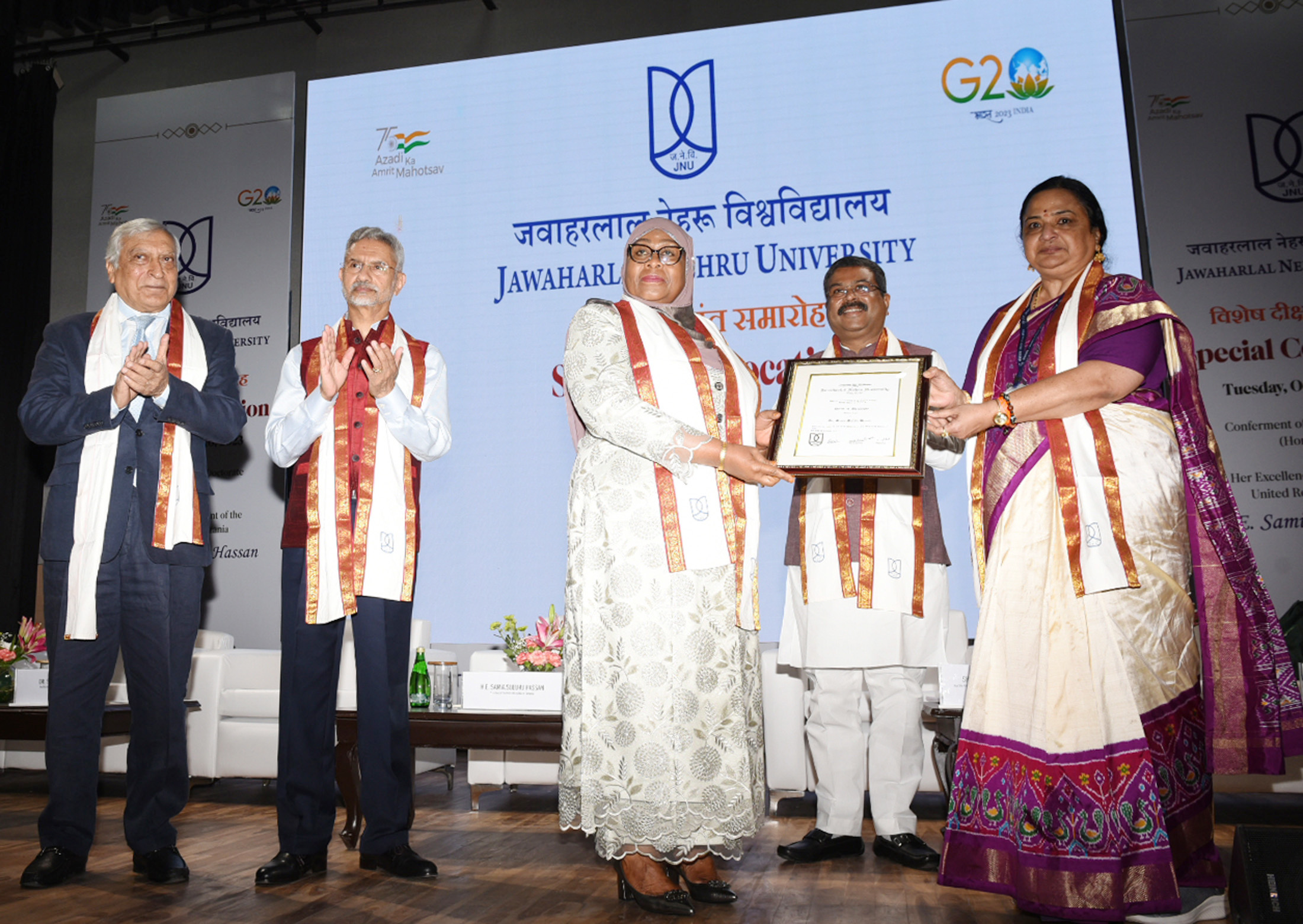
Suluhu receiving honorary doctorate at Jawaharlal Nehru University, October 2023

=== Honours ===
Year	Country	Order
2023	South Africa	Order of South Africa
2024	Tanzania (Zanzibar)	Order of the Revolution for Leaders with Unique Characteristics
2025	United Arab Emirates	Order of the Mother of the Nation

=== Awards ===
- 2022: Africa Road Builders – Babacar Ndiaye Trophy
- 2022: CARE International – CARE Impact Award for Women's Inspirational Leadership
- 2023: Key to the City of Lilongwe
- 2023: Ranked in Forbes list of "World's 100 most powerful women".
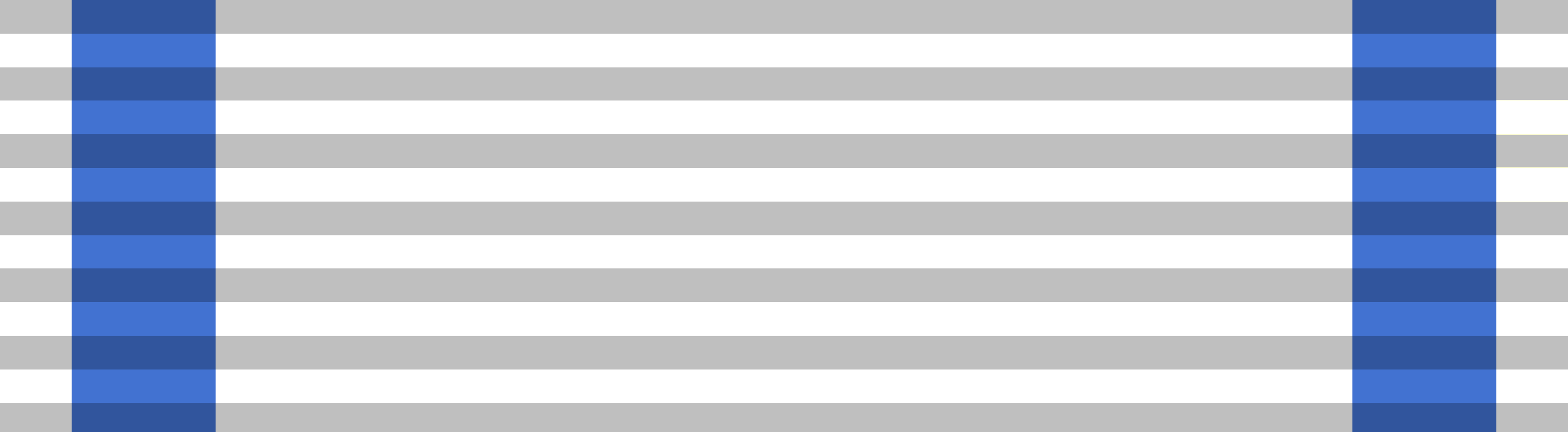
- 2025: International Military Sports Council Order of Merit (Grand Cordon)

=== Honorary academic awards ===
Year	University	Country	Honour
2022	University of Dar es Salaam	Tanzania	Doctor of Letters (D.Litt) (Honoris Causa)
2023	Jawaharlal Nehru University	India	Doctor of Philosophy (Honoris Causa)
2023	State University of Zanzibar	Tanzania	Doctor of Philosophy in Tourism Management and Marketing (Honoris Causa)
2024	Ankara University	Turkey	Honorary Doctorate in Economics (Honoris Causa)
2024	Korea Aerospace University	South Korea	Doctor of Philosophy in Aviation Management (Honoris Causa)
2024	Mzumbe University	Tanzania	Honoris causa
2026	Patrice Lumumba Peoples' Friendship University of Russia	Russia	Honoris causa

== Filmography ==
Film
Year	Title	Role	Notes
2022	The Royal Tour Tanzania	Herself	Documentary film
2023	The Hidden Tanzania	Herself	Pre-production

== See also ==
- List of current heads of state and government
- List of heads of the executive by approval rating

Political offices
Preceded by Mussa Silima	Minister of Tourism, Trade and Investment; 2005–2010	Succeeded by Said Ali Mbarouk
Preceded by Muhammed Seif Khatib	Minister of State for Union Affairs in the Vice President's Office; 2010–2015	Succeeded by January Makamba
Preceded by Mohamed Gharib Bilal	Vice-President of Tanzania; 2015–2021	Succeeded by Philip Mpango
Preceded by John Magufuli	President of Tanzania; 2021–Present	Incumbent
Party political offices
Preceded by Mohamed Gharib Bilal	CCM nominee for Vice-President of Tanzania; 2015, 2020	Most recent
