= Chief Justice of the Judiciary of Tanzania =

Highest judicial post

The chief justice of the Judiciary of Tanzania is the highest post in the judicial system of United Republic of Tanzania. The chief justice is appointed by the president and presides over the Court of Appeal of United Republic of Tanzania.

== History ==
After the First World War, the former German-governed colony Tanganyika was put under British authority in the Treaty of Versailles in 1919. A year later, a High Court was established by an Order in Council and the post of the chief justice was formed. Tanganyika became independent in 1961 and after a year was transformed into a republic.

In 1964 it merged with Zanzibar into the United Republic of Tanganyika and Zanzibar, which later in that year was renamed to United Republic of Tanzania. Despite the unification both parts of the new state retained their formed judicial system. The Court of Appeal for Tanzania, which has law jurisdiction over the entire state, was inaugurated in 1979.

== Chief justices of Tanganyika ==
- 1920–1924: William Morris Carter
- 1924–1929: William Alison Russell
- 1929–1934: Joseph Alfred Sheridan
- 1934–1936: Sidney Solomon Abrahams
- 1936–1939: Llewelyn Chisholm Dalton
- 1939–1945: Ambrose Henry Webb
- 1945–1951: George Graham Paul
- 1951–1955: Herbert Charles Fahie Cox
- 1955–1960: Edward John Davies
- 1960–1964: Ralph Windham

== Chief justices of the Judiciary of Tanzania ==
- 1964–1965: Ralph Windham
- 1965–1971: Philip Telford Georges
- 1971–1977: Augustine Saidi
- 1977–2000: Francis Lucas Nyalali
- 2000–2007: Barnabas A. Samatta
- 2007–2010: Augustino Ramadhani
- 2010–2017: Mohamed Chande Othman
- 2017–2025: Ibrahim Hamis Juma
- 2025–Incumbent: George Masaju

== See also ==
- Chief Justice of Zanzibar
