= Kassim Majaliwa =

Prime Minister of Tanzania from 2015 to 2025

The Right Honourable Kassim Majaliwa MP
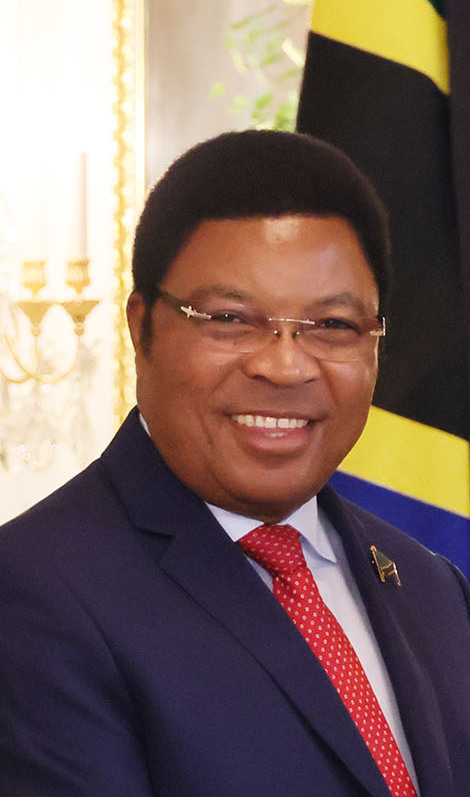
- Majaliwa in 2022

10th Prime Minister of Tanzania
- In office 20 November 2015 – 13 November 2025
- President: John Magufuli; Samia Suluhu Hassan
- Preceded by: Mizengo Pinda
- Succeeded by: Mwigulu Nchemba

Deputy Minister of State for Regional Administration and Local Government
- In office November 2010 – 5 November 2015
- President: Jakaya Kikwete
- Prime Minister: Mizengo Pinda

Member of Parliament for Ruangwa
- Incumbent
- Assumed office November 2010

District Commissioner for Urambo
- In office 2006–2010
- President: Jakaya Kikwete

Personal details
- Born: 22 December 1960 (age 65) Ruangwa District, Lindi Region, Tanganyika Territory (now Tanzania)
- Party: CCM
- Spouse: Mary Majaliwa
- Education: Mtwara TTC; University of Dar es Salaam; Stockholm University (PGDP)
- Profession: Teacher (1988–2000)

Military service
- Allegiance: United Rep. of Tanzania
- Branch/service: National Service
- Military camp: Makutopora JKT
- Duration: 1 year

Kassim Majaliwa Majaliwa (born 22 December 1960) is a Tanzanian politician who served as the Prime Minister of Tanzania from 2015 to 2025. He was appointed by President John Magufuli after the 2015 general election. He is a member of the ruling Chama Cha Mapinduzi party and has been a Member of Parliament for Ruangwa.

== Early life and education ==
Majaliwa was born into a Muslim family on 22 December 1960 in Mnacho village, Ruangwa District of Lindi Region. He completed his schooling from Kigonsera Secondary School in 1983. He then worked as a teacher for sixteen years until 1999. Meanwhile, he obtained a teaching diploma from Mtwara Teacher Training College in 1993 and a Bachelor of Education from the University of Dar es Salaam in 1998. He then joined the trade union movement and served as district secretary and regional secretary of the Tanzania Teachers' Association between 1999 and 2006. He was tapped to become the district commissioner for Urambo district in 2006. He remained in this role until his election to the Parliament in 2010.

== Political career ==
Majaliwa was first elected to Parliament in the 2010 general election on the Chama Cha Mapinduzi ticket from Ruangwa. He was Deputy Minister of State in the Prime Minister's Office for Regional Administration and Local Government from 2010 to 2015.

In the 2015 general election, Majaliwa was reelected from Ruangwa, defeating Omari Makota of the Civic United Front by a margin of 31,281 to 25,536 votes, taking 55% of the vote.

After John Magufuli was sworn in as President of Tanzania following the 2015 general election, he appointed Majaliwa as prime minister on 19 November 2015. His appointment was a surprise, even to himself, given he was a relative newcomer to electoral politics. His selection was attributed to his humility, honesty, work ethic as well as regional considerations - the new prime minister was expected to be from the southern part of the country, where Majaliwa is from. His experience in education as a teacher, trade unionist and deputy minister was also expected to be an asset in President Magufuli's stated desire to reform the sector. The opposition criticized his selection, citing his lack of experience.

In July 2025, Majaliwa announced that he would not seek reelection for parliament in the 2025 Tanzanian general election scheduled in October.

Political offices
Preceded by Mizengo Pinda	Prime Minister of Tanzania; 2015–2025	Succeeded by Mwigulu Nchemba
