= Elections in Tanzania =

Elections in Tanzania occur on both the local and national levels. The local government holds elections for street or village chair people. General elections at the national level elect the President and the members of the National Assembly. The president is elected for a five-year term.

== Latest elections ==
=== President ===
Candidate	Running mate	Party	Votes	%
Samia Suluhu Hassan	Emmanuel John Nchimbi	Chama Cha Mapinduzi	31,913,866	97.66
Mwalim Salum Juma	Devota Mathew Minja	Chama cha Ukombozi wa Umma	213,414	0.65
Gombo Samandito Gombo	Husna Mohamed Abdalla	Civic United Front	164,050	0.50
Almas Hassan Kisabya	Ali Khamis Hassan	National Reconstruction Alliance	99,396	0.30
Coaster Jimmy Kibonde	Azza Haji Suleiman	Chama Cha Makini	59,117	0.18
Kunje Ngombale Mwiru	Chum Juma Abdalla	Alliance for African Farmers Party	42,457	0.13
Abdul Juma Mluya	Sadoun Abrahman Khatib	Democratic Party	26,257	0.08
Ambar Khamis Haji	Evaline Wilbard Munisi	NCCR–Mageuzi	25,190	0.08
Saum Hussein Rashid	Juma Khamisi Faki	United Democratic Party	21,964	0.07
Doyo Hassan Doyo	Chausiku Khatib Mohammed	National League for Democracy	18,037	0.06
Rwamugira Mbatina Yustas	Amana Suleiman Mzee	Tanzania Labour Party	17,583	0.05
Bussungu Georges Gabriel	Makame Ali Issa	African Democratic Alliance Party	14,377	0.04
Mwajuma Noty Mirambo	Mashavu Alawi Haji	Union for Multiparty Democracy	13,814	0.04
Kyara Majalio Paul	Satia Mussa Bebwa	Sauti ya Umma	13,203	0.04
Wilson Elias Mulumbe	Shoka Khamis Juma	Alliance for Democratic Change	12,898	0.04
Mwaijojele David Daud	Masoud Ali Abdalla	Chama Cha Kijamii	12,516	0.04
Twalib Ibrahim Kadege	Abdalla Mohamed Khamis	United People's Democratic Party	10,705	0.03
Total			32,678,844	100.00
Registered voters/turnout			37,647,235	–
Source: EATV

Participation = 86,80%

=== National Assembly ===
Party	Votes	%	Seats			
Party	Votes	%	Constituency	Women	Total	+/−
Chama Cha Mapinduzi			270	113	383	+33
Alliance for Change and Transparency			2	0	2	–3
Chama cha Ukombozi wa Umma			0	2	2	+2
Presidential appointees			–	–	10	0
Elected by Zanzibar House of Representatives			–	–	5	0
Attorney-General			–	–	1	0
Total			272	115	403	+10
Registered voters/turnout	37,647,235	–				
Source: IPU, INEC

== The National Assembly ==
The National Assembly, or Bunge la Jamhuri ya Muungano, has 323 members: 232 members elected for a five-year term in single-seat constituencies and 75 seats allocated to women who are elected by the political parties that are represented in the National Assembly. This depends on the majority of elected members from each political party, including the elected members from Zanzibar specific for the United Republic of Tanzania. The president appoints ministers of government from among members of the National Assembly. The attorney general is automatically entitled to be part of the Parliament. The prime minister, appointed by the president from among members of the National Assembly, is the principal officer of the government business in the National Assembly.

== Party system ==
Tanzania has a dominant-party system with Chama Cha Mapinduzi in power (Status 2020). Chadema, NCCR–Mageuzi, and CUF are some other opposition parties represented in the National Assembly
