= List of political parties in Tanzania =

This article lists political parties in Tanzania. The country operates under a dominant multi-party system with the ruling party being in power since the nation attained its independence in 1961. It first governed as the Tanganyika African National Union, before merging with the Afro-Shirazi Party to form the Chama Cha Mapinduzi.

== Brief history and overview ==
Tanzania attained its independence as Tanganyika Territory from the United Kingdom in 1961 with the Tanganyika African National Union (TANU) forming its first government. Following the Zanzibar Revolution in 1964, it merged with the People's Republic of Zanzibar and Pemba to form the United Republic of Tanganyika and Zanzibar (present day Tanzania). It thereafter became a one-party state with TANU and the Afro-Shirazi Party (ASP) being the only parties operating on the mainland and the Zanzibar Archipelago respectively.

On 5 February 1977, TANU merged with its Zanzibari counterpart, the ASP to form the Chama Cha Mapinduzi which served as the sole legal party until 1992 when multi-party system was re-introduced. The country also adopted the Structural Adjustment Program upon recommendation of the Bretton Woods Institutions.

Since the re-introduction of the multi-party system, the CCM has continued to retain its popularity and the voter's confidence, having won all general elections since 1995. Jakaya Kikwete, the party's presidential candidate in 2005 won the election by a landslide victory receiving more than 80% of the popular vote.

== List ==
Party	Acronym	Founded	Bunge	ZHoR
Party of the Revolution; Swahili: Chama cha Mapinduzi	CCM	1977	383 / 403	68 / 76
Alliance for Change and Transparency; Swahili: Umoja wa Mabadiliko na Uwazi	ACT	2014	2 / 403	4 / 76
People's Liberation Party; Swahili: Chama cha Ukombozi wa Umma	CHAUMMA	2013	2 / 403	0 / 76
African Democratic Alliance Party	TADEA	1990	0 / 403	1 / 76
Alliance for Democratic Change; Swahili: Umoja wa Mabadiliko ya Demokrasia	ADC	2012	0 / 403	1 / 76
Alliance for Tanzania Farmers Party; Swahili: Chama cha Wakulima	AFP	2009	0 / 403	1 / 76
Party for Democracy and Progress; Swahili: Chama cha Demokrasia na Maendeleo	CHADEMA	1992	0 / 403	0 / 76
Civic United Front; Swahili: Chama cha Wananchi	CUF	1992	0 / 403	0 / 76
Union for Multiparty Democracy	UMD	1993	0 / 403	0 / 76
National Convention for Construction and Reform – Mageuzi; Swahili: Chama cha Mageuzi na Ujenzi wa Taifa	NCCR-M	1992	0 / 403	0 / 76
United People's Democratic Party	UPDP	1993	0 / 403	0 / 76
National Reconstruction Alliance	NRA	1993	0 / 403	0 / 76
Democratic Party; Swahili: Chama cha Kidemokrasia	DP	2002	0 / 403	0 / 76
United Democratic Party	UDP	1994	0 / 403	0 / 76
Justice and Development Party; Swahili: Chama cha Haki na Ustawi	CHAUSTA	1998	0 / 403	0 / 76
Progressive Party of Tanzania – Maendeleo	PPT-Maendeleo	2003	0 / 403	0 / 76
People's Voice; Swahili: Sauti ya Umma	SAU	2005	0 / 403	0 / 76
Social Party; Swahili: Chama cha Kijamii	CCK	2012	0 / 403	0 / 76

== Defunct parties ==
- Afro-Shirazi Party (ASP)
- Attentive Democracy Party (Demokrasia Makini, MAKINI)
- Tanganyika African National Union (TANU)
- Tanzania Labour Party (Chama cha wafanyakazi Tanzania, TLP)
- Traditional Dhow
- National League for Democracy (NLD)
- Zanzibar and Pemba People's Party (ZPPP)
- Zanzibar Nationalist Party (ZNP)

== See also ==
- Politics of Tanzania
- List of political parties by country
