= 2014 Tanzanian local elections =

2014 Tanzanian civic election
- 14 December 2014

c. 11.4 million registered voters Simple-majority votes needed to win
Party	CCM	Chadema	CUF

A civic election was held in Tanzania on Sunday, 14 December 2014.

== Results ==
Party	Villages	Streets	Total	%
Chama Cha Mapinduzi	7,290	2,116	9,406	74.50
Chadema	1,248	753	2,001	15.85
Civic United Front	946	235	1,81	9.35
Alliance for Change and Transparency	–	9	9	
NCCR–Mageuzi	–	8	8	
United Democratic Party	4	–	4	
National League for Democracy	2	–	2	
Tanzania Labour Party	2	1	3	
National Reconstruction Alliance	–	1	1	
Union for Multiparty Democracy	–	1	1	
Total	9,501	3,124	12,625	100.00
Source:The Citizen
