= 2014 Chalinze by-election =

← 2010	6 April 2014	2015 →

The Chalinze constituency in the Tanzanian Parliament
Candidate	Ridhiwani Kikwete	Mathayo Torongey
Party	CCM	Chadema
Popular vote	20,828	2,544
Percentage	86.44	10.56
MP before election
Saidi Bwanamdogo
CCM
Elected MP
Ridhiwani Kikwete
CCM

The Chalinze by-election was a by-election held in Tanzania for the parliamentary constituency of Chalinze. It was triggered by the death of Saidi Bwanamdogo, the previous Member of Parliament (MP) who had held the seat for the Chama Cha Mapinduzi since 2010. The by-election took place on 6 April 2014 and the CCM candidate won by a landslide.

== Results ==
Election	Political result	Candidate	Party	Votes	%	±%
Chalinze by-election, 2014; Death of Saidi Bwanamdogo; 328 spoilt votes Electorate: 92,939; Turnout: 24,422 (26.28%) –14.3	CCM hold Majority: 18,284 (75.89%)	Ridhiwani Kikwete	CCM	20,828	86.44	–0.86
Chalinze by-election, 2014; Death of Saidi Bwanamdogo; 328 spoilt votes Electorate: 92,939; Turnout: 24,422 (26.28%) –14.3	CCM hold Majority: 18,284 (75.89%)	Mathayo Torongey	Chadema	2,544	10.56	-
Chalinze by-election, 2014; Death of Saidi Bwanamdogo; 328 spoilt votes Electorate: 92,939; Turnout: 24,422 (26.28%) –14.3	CCM hold Majority: 18,284 (75.89%)	Fabian Skauki	CUF	473	1.98	–5.54
Chalinze by-election, 2014; Death of Saidi Bwanamdogo; 328 spoilt votes Electorate: 92,939; Turnout: 24,422 (26.28%) –14.3	CCM hold Majority: 18,284 (75.89%)	Ramadhani Mgaya	AFP	186	0.77	-
Chalinze by-election, 2014; Death of Saidi Bwanamdogo; 328 spoilt votes Electorate: 92,939; Turnout: 24,422 (26.28%) –14.3	CCM hold Majority: 18,284 (75.89%)	Munir Hussein	NRA	60	0.25	-
