= 2015 Tanzanian general election =

- 25 October 2015
- Registered: 23,161,440
- Presidential election
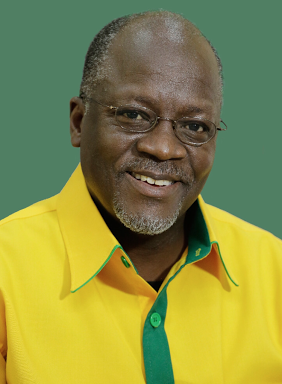

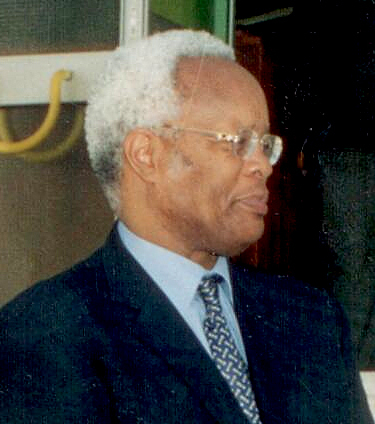
Nominee	John Magufuli	Edward Lowassa
Party	CCM	Chadema
Running mate	Samia Suluhu	Juma Duni Haji
Popular vote	8,882,935	6,072,848
Percentage	58.46%	39.97%
- Vote share for John Magufuli (CCM)
President before election
Jakaya Kikwete
CCM
Elected President
John Magufuli
CCM
- National Assembly election
- 377 of the 393 seats in the National Assembly; 197 seats needed for a majority
Party	Leader	Vote %	Seats	+/–
CCM	John Magufuli	55.06	260	+7
Chadema	Edward Lowassa	31.91	73	+25
CUF	Ibrahim Lipumba	8.75	42	+8
ACT–Wazalendo	Anna Mghwira	2.19	1	New
NCCR–Mageuzi	James Mbatia	1.24	1	−3
This lists parties that won seats. See the complete results below.

General elections were held in Tanzania on 25 October 2015. Voters elected the president, members of Parliament, and local government councillors. By convention, the election was held on the last Sunday of October and was supervised by the National Electoral Commission (NEC). Political campaigns commenced on 22 August and ceased a day before the elections.

The incumbent president, Jakaya Kikwete, had served out two terms, the maximum allowed under the law, and was ineligible to run for a third term. Chama Cha Mapinduzi (CCM), the country's dominant ruling party, selected Works Minister John Magufuli as its presidential nominee instead of the front-runner, former Prime Minister Edward Lowassa. After failing to secure the CCM's nomination, Lowassa defected to the opposition Chadema party despite it once labelling him as "one of the most corrupt figures in Tanzanian society". This year's election was seen as the most competitive and unpredictable in the nation's history.

On 29 October, CCM's Magufuli was declared the winner of the presidential election ahead of Chadema's Lowassa, who has yet to concede amid a dispute. In the National Assembly election, the CCM maintained its supermajority in parliament, but key figures in the previous cabinet suffered defeats in their constituencies, while the opposition Chadema party secured its largest-yet number of seats.

== Background ==
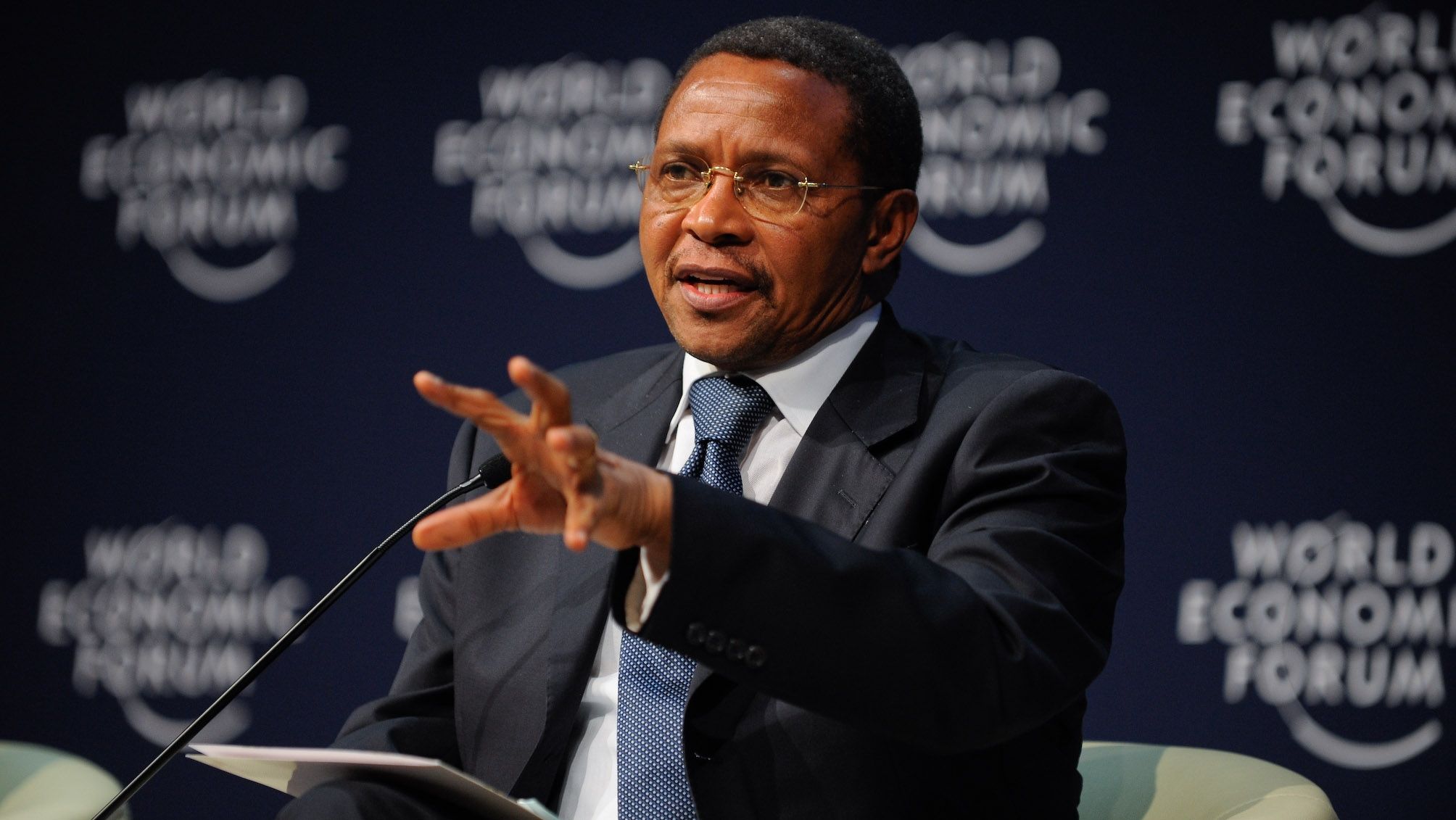
Kikwete has presided over an average economic growth of 7% over the past decade. Tanzania received a foreign direct investment (FDI) inflow of $2.14 billion in 2014 – the highest in the East African Community (EAC) region.

Tanzania is a unitary, democratic, secular and de jure socialist state. Unlike most of its neighbours, Tanzania–mainland has enjoyed relative political stability since attaining independence in 1961. This is part of the legacy of its first president, Julius Nyerere, who led the one-party state for 24 years until his resignation in 1985. Since then, a two-term presidential limit has been in place. As per the directive of the Bretton Woods Institutions, political and economic reforms were implemented in the 1990s.

All eligible voters were registered using the Biometric Voters' Register (BVR) kits. In June 2015, the National Bureau of Statistics (NBS) estimated that there were 24,252,927 eligible voters based on the adjusted national population census. By 2 August, NEC succeeded in registering 24,001,134 voters, although the final number was 23,254,485. The Tanzanian diaspora were not allowed to vote in this election.

At the Woodrow Wilson International Center for Scholars in Washington, D. C., President Kikwete said that he is looking forward to his retirement and described the presidency as being both "stressful and thankless." When asked as to why some African leaders cling to power, Kikwete replied that every country is different and suggested the interviewer "invite these leaders and talk to them". In May 2015, Kikwete denied reports that his government planned to extend his term beyond his constitutional mandate and assured the nation that he was "leaving in October".

A new constitution was expected to have been adopted before the general election via a referendum that had been postponed. The final draft of the proposed constitution includes the establishment of an independent electoral commission and will allow dissatisfied candidates to challenge the results in the High Court within seven days of the pronouncement. Chief Justice Mohamed Chande Othman has said the judiciary was prepared to handle all cases pertaining to the results of the forthcoming election.

On 29 July 2015, 21 political parties signed the 2015 General Elections Code of Conduct. About 4,000 adherents of the Watch Tower Church in Kalambo District have been prohibited from voting as it is against their beliefs. The Tanzanian Army refuted allegations made by CHADEMA that it had confiscated the BVR cards of its soldiers and warned political parties "to stop provoking it."

The government had warned politicians to refrain from engaging in witchcraft, and a deputy minister told parliament that reports linking politicians with the killings of people with albinism could be true as it increases during the election period. A ban on witch doctors was imposed in January 2015, as some of them condone the killings due to superstitious beliefs that the victims' bodies "possess powers that bring luck and prosperity".

== Electoral system ==
The president is elected in a single round by first-past-the-post voting for a five-year term. Article 39(1) of the 1977 Constitution stipulates the following qualifications for a person to be elected as President:

a) he is a citizen by birth in accordance with the citizenship law;
b) he has attained the age of forty years;
c) he is a member of, and a candidate nominated by, a political party;
d) he is qualified to be [an] MP or a Member of the House of Representatives;
e) he has not been convicted by any court for any offence relating to tax evasion.

The National Assembly consisted of 264 members elected in single-member constituencies by first-past-the-post voting, 113 women elected based on the vote share of parties nationwide, up to ten members elected by the president, five members elected by the Zanzibar House of Representatives and the Attorney-General. The Speaker could be elected from amongst members, or from outside parliament. Prior to the elections, twenty-six new constituencies were created by the National Electoral Commission (NEC) and the names of ten constituencies were altered. Four opposition parties with differing ideologies agreed to form an alliance known as UKAWA and intended to nominate a single candidate in each constituency. The alliance consists of the conservative/centrist Chadema, the liberal Civic United Front (CUF), the social democratic NCCR–Mageuzi and the National League for Democracy (NLD).

== Presidential election ==
=== Candidates ===
==== CCM ====
The ruling CCM (and its predecessor parties) has dominated the political scene since the nation attained independence in 1961. Following the restoration of multi-party politics in 1992, it has retained its popularity and the voters' confidence, winning all of the past four general elections (held in 1995, 2000, 2005 and 2010). Jakaya Kikwete, its presidential candidate in 2005, won by a landslide, receiving more than 80 percent of the popular vote. In the last election in 2010, Kikwete won his second and final term, albeit by a reduced margin.

More than forty members of the party contested in the primaries. On 10 July, the party's Central Committee scrutinised the then 38 presidential aspirants and selected five candidates for the consideration of its National Executive Committee. The top five were Foreign Minister Bernard Membe, Works Minister John Magufuli, Justice Minister Asha-Rose Migiro, Deputy Minister January Makamba and Ambassador Amina Salum Ali. On 11 July, the National Executive Committee selected the three finalists: John Magufuli, Amina Salum Ali and Asha-Rose Migiro.

On 12 July, Works Minister John Magufuli was declared as the party's candidate; he was considered most likely to win the election. The Economist Intelligence Unit in its political forecast stated that "CCM's candidate is almost certain to become the country's next president."

==== Opposition ====
Four opposition parties with differing ideologies agreed to form an alliance known as UKAWA and intended to nominate a single candidate. The alliance consists of the conservative/centrist Chadema party, the liberal Civic United Front (CUF), the social democratic NCCR–Mageuzi and the National League for Democracy (NLD).

Former Prime Minister and CCM front-runner Edward Lowassa defected to Chadema and was selected as the alliance's nominee instead of Wilbroad Slaa, who was Chadema's 2010 candidate. CUF National Chairman Ibrahim Lipumba resigned, stating that the coalition had "reneged on its agreement" on receiving those defecting from CCM.

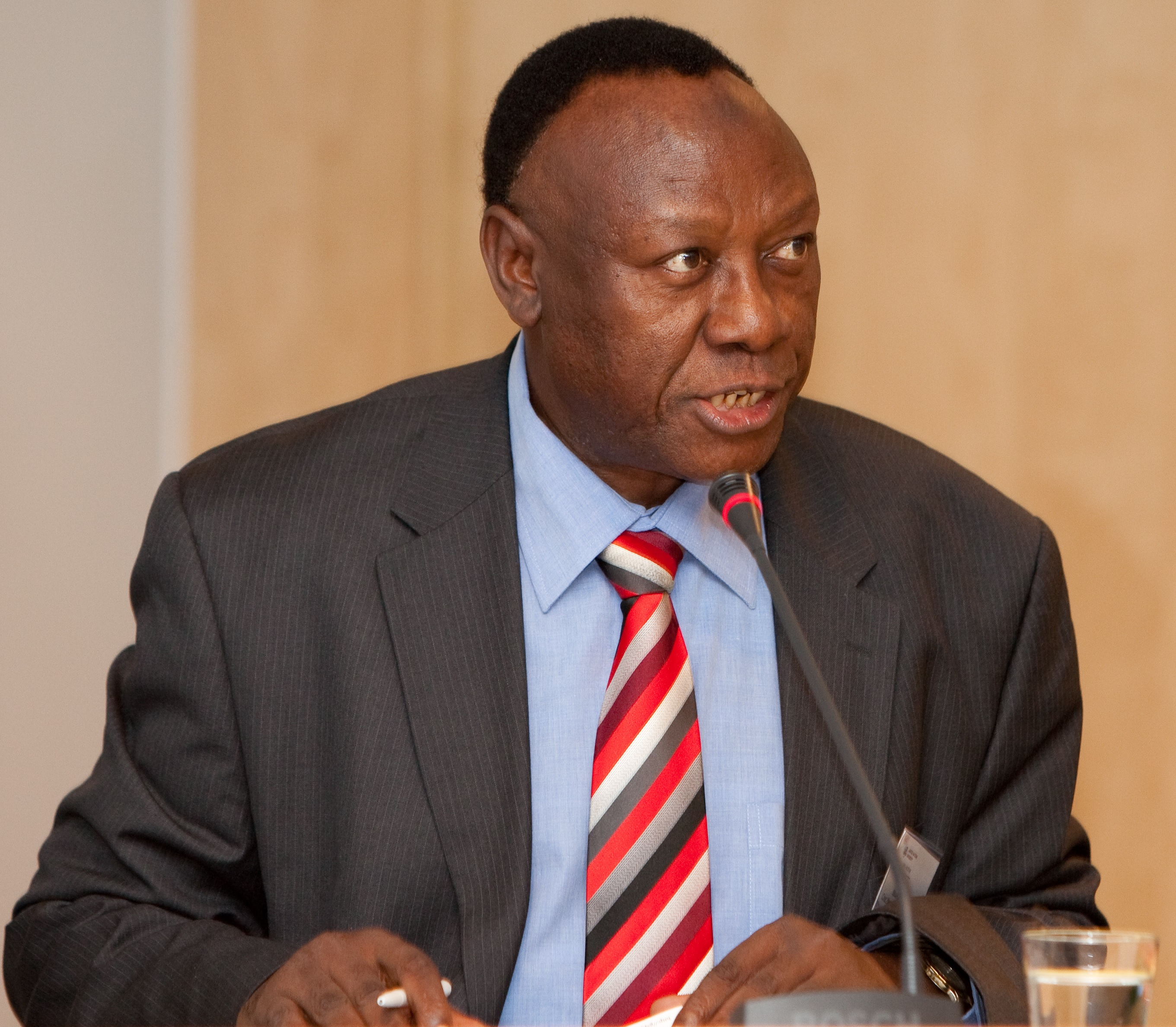
Ibrahim Lipumba resigned as CUF Chairman following Lowassa's selection as UKAWA's nominee.

Candidate	Running mate	Party
Anna Elisha Mghwira	Hamad Mussa Yussuf	Alliance for Change and Transparency (ACT)
Edward Lowassa	Juma Duni Haji	Chama cha Demokrasia na Maendeleo (CHADEMA)
Fahmi Nassoro Dovutwa	Hamadi Mohammed Ibrahimu	United People's Democratic Party (UPDP)
Hashim Rungwe Spunda	Issa Abas Hussein	Chama cha Ukombozi wa Umma (CHAUMMA)
Janken Malik Kasambala	Simai Abdulrahman Abdulla	National Reconstruction Alliance (NRA)
Lutalosa Yembe	Said Miraj Abdallah	Alliance for Democratic Change (ADC)
Machmillan Elifatio Lyimo	?	Tanzania Labour Party (TLP)

== Parliamentary elections ==
In the previous parliamentary elections, the nation's dominant ruling party, the Chama Cha Mapinduzi (CCM) attained 186 of the 239 constituencies, thus achieving an outright majority. Tanzania uses a parallel voting method for its legislative elections: most seats are elected by first-past-the-post voting, but the special seats reserved for women are elected by party-list proportional representation. On 9 July 2015, outgoing President Jakaya Kikwete addressed Parliament for the last time before it being dissolved. In the 2010–2015 parliament, the CCM was led by Prime Minister Mizengo Pinda while the opposition bench was led by Freeman Mbowe and consisted of CHADEMA (49), Civic United Front (35), NCCR–Mageuzi (5), Tanzania Labour Party (1) and United Democratic Party (1).

More than 2,700 CCM members contested in the party's primaries in order to seek the party's nomination. On 13 August 2015, CCM announced its candidates following its primaries.

== Zanzibar elections ==
The semi-autonomous archipelago of Zanzibar elects its own President and members to its subnational legislature, the Zanzibar House of Representatives. The Zanzibar Electoral Commission (ZEC) declared 25 October as the election date. The number of constituencies was increased from 50 to 54.

Presidential election

Candidate	Party
Ali Mohammed Shein	Chama Cha Mapinduzi
Seif Sharif Hamad	Civic United Front
Hamad Rashid Mohamed	Alliance for Democratic Change
Ambar Khamis Haji	NCCR–Mageuzi
Juma Ali Khatib	TADEA
Soud Said Soud	Alliance for Tanzania Farmers Party

== Opinion polls ==
Pre-nomination

Poll source	Date	Sample size	Undecided	Lowassa CCM	Pinda CCM	Slaa CHADEMA	Lipumba CUF	Membe CCM	Magufuli CCM	Mbowe CHADEMA	Zitto CHADEMA	Mwandosya CCM	Makamba CCM
Twaweza	September 2014	1,445	33%	13.0%	12.0%	11.0%	6.0%	5.0%	3.0%	3.0%	1.0%		
Positive Thinkers	March 2015	3,298	–	22.8%	3.2%	19.5%	8.9%	5.9%	6.8%		6.7%	1.2%	1.6%
Samunge SSRC	2013–2015	7,000	–	20.7%	2.4%	11.7%	4.2%	7.0%	7.6%	3.4%	3.4%		4.8%
REDET	23–26 June 2015	1,250	–	27.0%	7.2%			8.2%	6.6%			3.1%	0.8%
REDET	23–26 June 2015	1,250	–			23.1%	13.6%			7.2%			

Post-nomination

Poll source	Date	Sample size	Undecided	Magufuli CCM	Lowassa CHADEMA	Mghwira ACT	Others	Notes
Twaweza	19 August–7 September 2015	1,848	7.0%	65.0%	25.0%	N/A	3.0%	Margin of error of +/-2.5%
Ipsos	5–22 September 2015	1,836	7.3%	61.6%	30.8%	0.3%	–	Margin of error of +/-2.3%
TADIP	1–21 September 2015	2,040	3.0%	40.0%	54.5%	2.0%	–	Poll conducted in only 10 regions

== Results ==
=== President ===
Candidate	Running mate	Party	Votes	%
John Magufuli	Samia Suluhu	Chama Cha Mapinduzi	8,882,935	58.46
Edward Lowassa	Juma Duni Haji	Chadema	6,072,848	39.97
Anna Mghwira	Hamad Mussa Yussuf	Alliance for Change and Transparency	98,763	0.65
Lutalosa Yembe	Said Miraj Abdallah	Alliance for Democratic Change	66,049	0.43
Hashim Rungwe Spunda	Issa Abas Hussein	Chama cha Ukombozi wa Umma	49,256	0.32
Machmillan Elifatio Lyimo	–	Tanzania Labour Party	8,198	0.05
Janken Malik Kasambala	Simai Abdulrahman Abdulla	National Reconstruction Alliance	8,028	0.05
Fahmi Nassoro Dovutwa	Hamadi Mohammed Ibrahimu	United People's Democratic Party	7,785	0.05
Total			15,193,862	100.00
Valid votes			15,193,862	97.42
Invalid/blank votes			402,248	2.58
Total votes			15,596,110	100.00
Registered voters/turnout			23,161,440	67.34
Source: NEC

=== National Assembly ===
Party	Votes	%	Seats			
Party	Votes	%	Constituency	Women	Total	+/–
Chama Cha Mapinduzi	8,166,203	55.06	194	66	260	+7
Chadema	4,732,782	31.91	36	37	73	+25
Civic United Front	1,297,526	8.75	32	10	42	+8
Alliance for Change and Transparency	324,317	2.19	1	0	1	New
NCCR–Mageuzi	183,952	1.24	1	0	1	–3
Chama cha Ukombozi wa Umma	23,058	0.16	0	0	0	New
Democratic Party	14,471	0.10	0	0	0	0
United Democratic Party	13,757	0.09	0	0	0	–1
Tanzania Labour Party	13,117	0.09	0	0	0	–1
Tanzania Democratic Alliance	12,979	0.09	0	0	0	0
Alliance for Democratic Change	12,604	0.08	0	0	0	New
Chama cha Haki na Ustawi	8,217	0.06	0	0	0	0
Alliance for Tanzania Farmers Party	7,504	0.05	0	0	0	0
United People's Democratic Party	3,860	0.03	0	0	0	0
Jahazi Asilia	3,344	0.02	0	0	0	0
Progressive Party of Tanzania – Maendeleo	3,037	0.02	0	0	0	0
Chama Cha Kijamii	2,383	0.02	0	0	0	New
National League for Democracy	2,152	0.01	0	0	0	0
Union for Multiparty Democracy	1,975	0.01	0	0	0	0
Sauti ya Umma	1,810	0.01	0	0	0	0
National Reconstruction Alliance	1,510	0.01	0	0	0	0
Demokrasia Makini	1,293	0.01	0	0	0	0
Presidential appointees			–	–	10	0
Elected by Zanzibar House of Representatives			–	–	5	0
Attorney-General			–	–	1	0
Total	14,831,851	100.00	264	113	393	+36
Registered voters/turnout	23,161,440	–				
Source: NEC, EISA, EISA

== Reactions ==
Second-placed candidate Edward Lowassa called for a recount, citing irregularities. In response to the National Electoral Commission's (NEC) plan to reveal the winner of the presidential race on 29 October, Lowassa called for the cancellation of the announcement. "We demand that NEC should do a verification of the results and recount the votes." However, the NEC and CCM dismissed allegations of rigging, with NEC Chairman Damian Labuva, stating "Claims of vote rigging highly misleading it is not true at all."

=== Allegations of misconduct ===
In Zanzibar, the local election commission stated that there had been "gross violations," and that the election had been annulled. Then-Chairman of the Zanzibari Electoral Commission Jecha Salim Jecha described physical fights that had broken out between rival electoral commissioners in its aftermath, and criticized the extreme partisanship that characterized their ranks. He claimed that the number of votes cast was more than the number of registered voters, particularly on the island of Pemba. Party agents were supposedly ejected from polling stations there as well.

A member of Civic United Front (CUF) said that annulling the result was a ploy to re-run the election it had won. CCM alleged there were violations in at least four parliamentary constituencies it had lost and that it would go to court to contest the result, but added that the "elections were free and fair" and that voting reflected the will of the people. In ensuing protests in Zanzibar, several people were arrested. The annulled Zanzibar poll did not affect this overall outcome.
