= 2020 Tanzanian general election =

General election in Tanzania

- 28 October 2020
- Presidential election
- Registered: 29,754,699
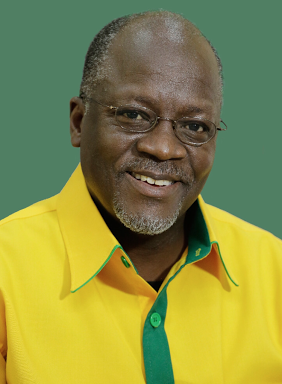

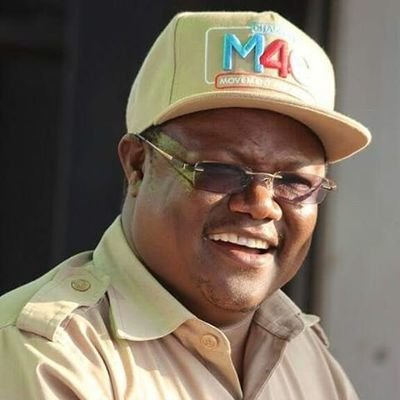
Nominee	John Magufuli	Tundu Lissu
Party	CCM	Chadema
Running mate	Samia Suluhu	Salim Mwalimu
Popular vote	12,516,252	1,933,271
Percentage	84.40%	13.04%
President before election
John Magufuli
CCM
Elected President
John Magufuli
CCM

General elections were held in Tanzania on 28 October 2020 to elect the President and members of National Assembly. The presidential election was won by incumbent John Magufuli of the Chama Cha Mapinduzi party. Magufuli died the following year.

== Background ==
In April 2019, Livingstone Lusinde, an MP for the ruling Chama Cha Mapinduzi party, suggested that holding a presidential election in 2020 was not a good idea due to the cost, and that the money should be used for development projects. The proposal was likely made in order to keep President John Magufuli in office till 2025, with Lusinde saying "no one can defeat president Magufuli" anyway.

Opposition parties Chadema, Alliance for Change and Transparency, and NCCR-Mageuzi announced they had started negotiations to form an alliance ahead of the election.

The election commission announced that the campaign would run from 26 August to 27 October 2020.

== Electoral system ==
The president is elected in a single round by first-past-the-post voting for a five-year term. Article 39(1) of the 1977 Constitution requires candidates to be Tanzanian citizens by birth, at least 40 years old, be nominated by a political party of which they are a member, be qualified to be an MP or a member of the Zanzibar House of Representatives and not have any convictions related to tax evasion.

== Presidential candidates ==
=== CCM ===
The ruling CCM (and its predecessor parties) has dominated the political scene since the nation attained independence in 1961. Following the restoration of multi-party politics in 1992, it has retained its popularity and the voters' confidence, winning all of the past five general elections (held in 1995, 2000, 2005, 2010, 2015). The previous election was won by John Magufuli, who ran for re-election for his second term.

=== Opposition ===
==== CHADEMA ====
The main opposition party Chama cha Democracia na Maendeleo (CHADEMA) held its general council conference in Dar es Salaam on 3 August 2020. A total of seven members completed their nomination forms for the position for the Union President.

- Tundu Lissu, MP for Singida East
- Lazaro Nyalandu, former Deputy Minister of Industry and Trade and MP for Singida North
- Mayrose Majige, human development specialist
- Isaya Mwita Charles, mayor of Dar es Salaam
- Leonard Manyama, political analyst
- Gasper Mwanalyela, advocate for the High Court of Tanzania
- Richmond Simba, advocate

A total of 453 of 456 party general council delegates attended the conference. The three names passed on by the central committee for the general council to vote on were, Tundu Lissu (405 votes), Lazaro Nyalandu (36 votes) and Mayrose Majige (1 vote), with Lissu chosen as CHADEMA's Union presidential candidate.

==== ACT-Wazalendo ====
Alliance for Change and Transparency-Wazalendo part held their central committee elections on 5 August 2020. The party's 420 central committee members nominated ex foreign minister Bernard Membe with 97.61% vote as the union presidential candidate. Membe was expelled from CCM earlier in the year and moved over to ACT to be able to run for president.

== Conduct ==
On 24 October 2020 the opposition claimed that the government was interfering in the election by making it more difficult to accredit thousands of opposition electoral observers, whose job is to ensure that the election is fair. The National Electoral Commission, whose members are appointed by the president, barred Lissu from campaigning after he said Magufuli had organised a meeting with election officials. From 27 October, the Tanzania Communication Regulatory Authority (TCRA) blocked several popular social media websites to restrict communication amid violence in the islands of Zanzibar, where dozens have been shot dead and tens have been injured by the police and other security forces.

According to Al Jazeera, "The election was marred by allegations of arrests of candidates and protesters, restrictions on agents of political parties to access polling stations, multiple voting, pre-ticking of ballots, and widespread blocking of social media." A local elections watchdog group noted a heavy deployment of military and police whose conduct created a “climate of fear”.

== Results ==
=== President ===
Candidate	Running mate	Party	Votes	%
John Magufuli	Samia Suluhu	Chama cha Mapinduzi	12,516,252	84.40
Tundu Lissu	Salum Mwalimu Juma	Chadema	1,933,271	13.04
Bernard Kamillius Membe	Omar Fakih Hamad	Alliance for Change and Transparency	81,129	0.55
Leopord Lucas Mahona	Khamis Ali Hassan	National Reconstruction Alliance	80,787	0.54
Ibrahim Lipumba	Hamida Huweishil Abdalla	Civic United Front	72,885	0.49
John Paul Shibuda	Hassan Kornely Kijogoo	Tanzania Democratic Alliance	33,086	0.22
Hashim Spunda Rungwe	Mohammed Massoud Rashid	Chama cha Ukombozi wa Umma	32,878	0.22
Yeremia Kulwa Maganja	Khamis Haji Ambar	NCCR–Mageuzi	19,969	0.13
Muttamwega Bhatt Mgaywa	Satia Mussa Bebwa	Sauti ya Umma	14,922	0.10
Cecilia Augustino Mwanga	Tabu Mussa Juma	Attentive Democracy Party	14,556	0.10
Philipo John Fumbo	Zaina Juma Khamis	Democratic Party	8,283	0.06
Queen Cuthbert Sendiga	Khamis Juma Shoka	Alliance for Democratic Change	7,627	0.05
Twalib Ibrahim Kadege	Ramadhan Ali Abdallah	United People's Democratic Party	6,194	0.04
Seif Maalim Seif	Rashid Ligania Rai	Alliance for African Farmers Party	4,635	0.03
Khalfan Mohammed Mazrui	Mashavu Alawi Haji	Union for Multiparty Democracy	3,721	0.03
Total			14,830,195	100.00
Valid votes			14,830,195	98.27
Invalid/blank votes			261,755	1.73
Total votes			15,091,950	100.00
Registered voters/turnout			29,754,699	50.72
Source: NEC

=== National Assembly ===
Party	Votes	%	Seats			
Party	Votes	%	Constituency	Women	Total	+/−
Chama Cha Mapinduzi	8,830,791	75.65	256	94	350	+90
Chadema	2,037,794	17.46	1	19	20	−53
Alliance for Change and Transparency	373,168	3.20	5	0	5	+4
Civic United Front	270,974	2.32	2	0	2	−40
NCCR–Mageuzi	45,574	0.39	0	0	0	−1
Alliance for Democratic Change	34,370	0.29	0	0	0	0
Tanzania Democratic Alliance	12,648	0.11	0	0	0	0
United Democratic Party	10,930	0.09	0	0	0	0
Chama Cha Kijamii	10,790	0.09	0	0	0	0
Chama cha Ukombozi wa Umma	8,968	0.08	0	0	0	0
Alliance for African Farmers Party	8,519	0.07	0	0	0	0
Demokrasia Makini	7,271	0.06	0	0	0	0
National Reconstruction Alliance	5,632	0.05	0	0	0	0
United People's Democratic Party	4,109	0.04	0	0	0	0
Tanzania Labour Party	3,404	0.03	0	0	0	0
Democratic Party	3,364	0.03	0	0	0	0
Union for Multiparty Democracy	2,458	0.02	0	0	0	0
Sauti ya Umma	1,293	0.01	0	0	0	0
National League for Democracy	637	0.01	0	0	0	0
Presidential appointees			–	–	10	–
Elected by Zanzibar House of Representatives			–	–	5	–
Attorney-General			–	–	1	–
Total	11,672,694	100.00	264	113	393	0
Registered voters/turnout	29,754,699	–				
Source: NEC, IPU

== International reactions ==
The Tanzania electoral watch panel, U.S. State Department, Commonwealth, and European Union were very critical about the elections.

On 10 November 2020, OHCHR published a declaration on the electoral process and its consequences. It was at once answered by Tanzania government.
