= Politics of Tanzania =

The politics of Tanzania takes place in the framework of a unitary presidential democratic republic whereby the President of Tanzania is both head of state and head of government within a nominally multi-party system. Executive power is exercised by the government. Legislative power is vested in both the government and parliament. The party system is dominated by the Chama Cha Mapinduzi (Revolutionary State Party). The judiciary is de jure independent although it has been influenced by the ruling party which has used it to persecute political opponents.

Since 2014, the Chama Cha Mapinduzi (Revolutionary State Party), under the presidencies of John Magufuli and Samia Suluhu Hassan overseen democratic backsliding and the development of a single-party state, as the party has repressed the opposition and prevented free and fair elections from taking place. The Economist Intelligence Unit rated Tanzania a "hybrid regime" in 2024.

== Political conditions ==
Full independence came in December 1961 and Julius Kambarage Nyerere (1922–1999), a socialist leader who led Tanganyika from colonial rule, was elected president in 1962. One of Africa's most respected figures, Julius Nyerere was seen as a politician of principle and intelligence. Known as Mwalimu (teacher), he proposed a widely acclaimed vision of education.

From independence in 1961 until the mid-1980s, Tanzania was a one-party state, with a socialist model of economic development. Beginning in the mid-1980s, under the administration of President Ali Hassan Mwinyi, Tanzania undertook a number of political and economic reforms. In January and February 1992, the government decided to adopt multiparty democracy. Legal and constitutional changes led to the registration of 11 political parties. Two parliamentary by-elections were held in 1995 and were both won by the Chama Cha Mapinduzi (CCM) and were the first-ever multiparty elections in Tanzanian history.

In October 2000, Tanzania held its second multi-party general elections. The ruling CCM party's candidate, Benjamin W. Mkapa, defeated his three main rivals, winning the presidential election with 71% of the vote. In the parliamentary elections, CCM won 202 of the 232 elected seats. In the Zanzibar presidential election, Amani Abeid Karume, the son of former President Abeid Karume, defeated CUF candidate Seif Shariff Hamad. The election was marred by irregularities, and subsequent political violence claimed at least 23 lives in January 2001, mostly on Pemba island, where police used tear gas and live bullets against demonstrators. Hundreds were injured, and state forces were reported to have attacked boats of refugees fleeing to Kenya. 16 CUF members were subsequently expelled from the Union Parliament after boycotting the legislature to protest the Zanzibar election results.

In October 2001, the CCM and the CUF parties signed a reconciliation agreement that called for electoral reforms and set up a Commission of Inquiry to investigate the deaths that occurred in January 2001 on Pemba. The agreement also led to the presidential appointment of an additional CUF official to become a member of the Union Parliament. Changes to the Zanzibar Constitution in April 2002 allowed both the CCM and CUF parties to nominate members to the Zanzibar Electoral Commission. In May 2003, the Zanzibar Electoral Commission conducted by-elections to fill vacant seats in the parliament, including those seats vacated by the CUF boycott. Observers considered these by-elections, the first major test of the reconciliation agreement, to be free, fair and peaceful. President Mkapa, Vice President Ali Mohamed Shein, Prime Minister Frederick Sumaye, and National Assembly members served until the next general elections in 2005. Similarly, Zanzibar President Karume and members of the Zanzibar House of Representatives also completed their terms in office in 2005. The 2005 general elections were subsequently won by the ruling CCM party's presidential candidate Jakaya Kikwete with CHADEMA emerging as the main opposition party. The elections were not considered free or fair, especially on the island of Zanzibar.

As of 2010, Tanzania was ranked Partly Free by Freedom House. The 2011 Democracy Index marked Tanzania as a "hybrid regime", ranking it 90th out of 167, an improvement from 92nd the year before, but preceding a decline on a number of metrics as shown in subsequent Freedom House studies. By 2018, many of the factors taken into account by Freedom House had undergone a small but significant decline, with the most recent reports citing a marked deterioration in the rights of civil society and reduced the abilities of political opposition to criticise the Magufuli regime. In Freedom House's 2025 report, Tanzania dropped to a score of 35, receiving the designation of "Not Free". Freedom House cites the change as due to the government's alteration to ethnic Masaai voter registrations as an attempt to expel communities belonging to the group from a planned game reserve.

According to Human Rights Watch, since the December 2015 election of President John Magufuli, Tanzania has witnessed a marked decline in respect for freedom of expression, association and assembly.

On 19 March 2021, Vice President Samia Suluhu Hassan became the new president after the sudden death of President John Magufuli. She is the first female President of Tanzania.

In October 2025, Tanzania held its seventh multi-party general elections. Incumbent president Samia Suluhu Hassan of the CCM won almost 98% of all votes which is the second highest percentage of vote ever won by any presidential candidate in Tanzanian history since Julius Nyerere in 1962. The elections were marked by the absence of any meaningful opposition as the two largest opposition parties, CHADEMA and the Alliance for Change and Transparency were barred from participating. The elections were followed by violent protests which lasted till November and resulted in the deaths of almost 3,000 people although this has been disputed.

== Executive branch ==
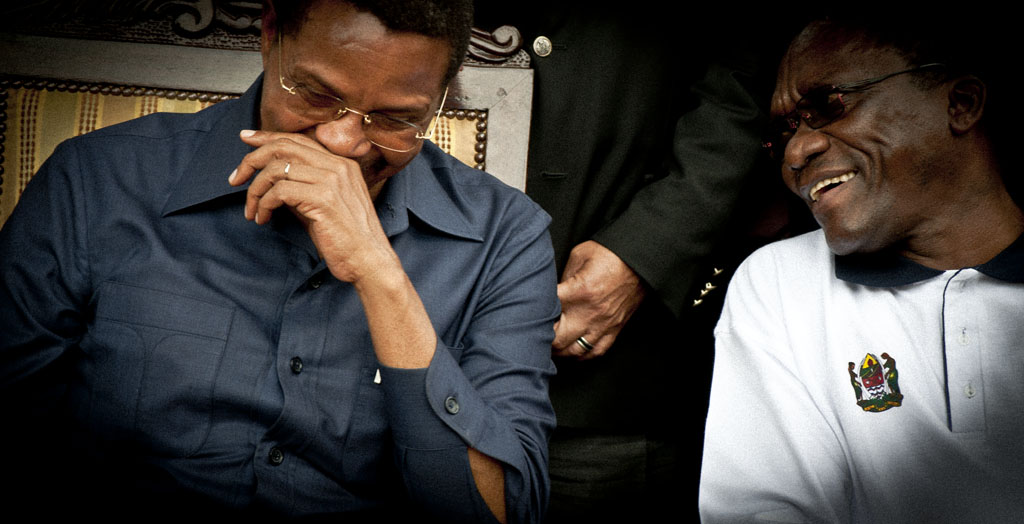
President Kikwete shares a light moment with PM Pinda at the latter's hometown

Main office-holders
| Office | Name | Party | Since |
|---|---|---|---|
| President | Samia Suluhu Hassan | Chama Cha Mapinduzi | 19 March 2021 |
| Prime Minister | Mwigulu Nchemba | Chama Cha Mapinduzi | 13 November 2025 |
| Vice President | Deogratius Ndejembi | Chama Cha Mapinduzi | 9 September 2026 |

The executive branch of the Tanzanian government is responsible for implementing and enforcing the laws and policies of the country. It is headed by the President of the United Republic of Tanzania, who serves as both the head of state and the head of government. The President is elected for a term of five years, and can be re-elected for a maximum of two terms. In the event a serving president dies or is incapacitated and the Vice President serves three-fourths of the current term, they cannot run for a second term.

The president appoints a prime minister who serves as the government's leader in the National Assembly. The president selects his cabinet from among National Assembly members. The Constitution also empowers him to nominate 10 non-elected members of Parliament, who also are eligible to become cabinet members.

The President is assisted in their duties by the Vice President, who is also directly elected by the people. The Vice President may also be assigned specific responsibilities by the President.

The executive branch is further divided into ministries, each of which is responsible for a specific area of government policy. The ministers are appointed by the President and are responsible for the day-to-day operations of their respective ministries. Each ministry is headed by a Permanent Secretary, who is the chief administrative officer of the ministry.

Other important officials in the executive branch include the Attorney General, who is the principal legal adviser to the government, and the Chief Secretary, who is the head of the civil service and is responsible for ensuring the smooth functioning of the government.

The executive branch in Tanzania is responsible for overseeing the country's economic development, foreign affairs, defence, and internal security. It plays a key role in implementing policies aimed at promoting economic growth, improving living standards, and reducing poverty. It also works to maintain peace and stability within the country, and to build strong partnerships with other countries in the region and beyond.

In November 2025, President Samia Suluhu Hassan appointed a reshuffled cabinet comprising 27 ministers and 29 deputy ministers following her re‑election, marking one of the most extensive executive reorganisation since she first took office.

== Legislative branch ==
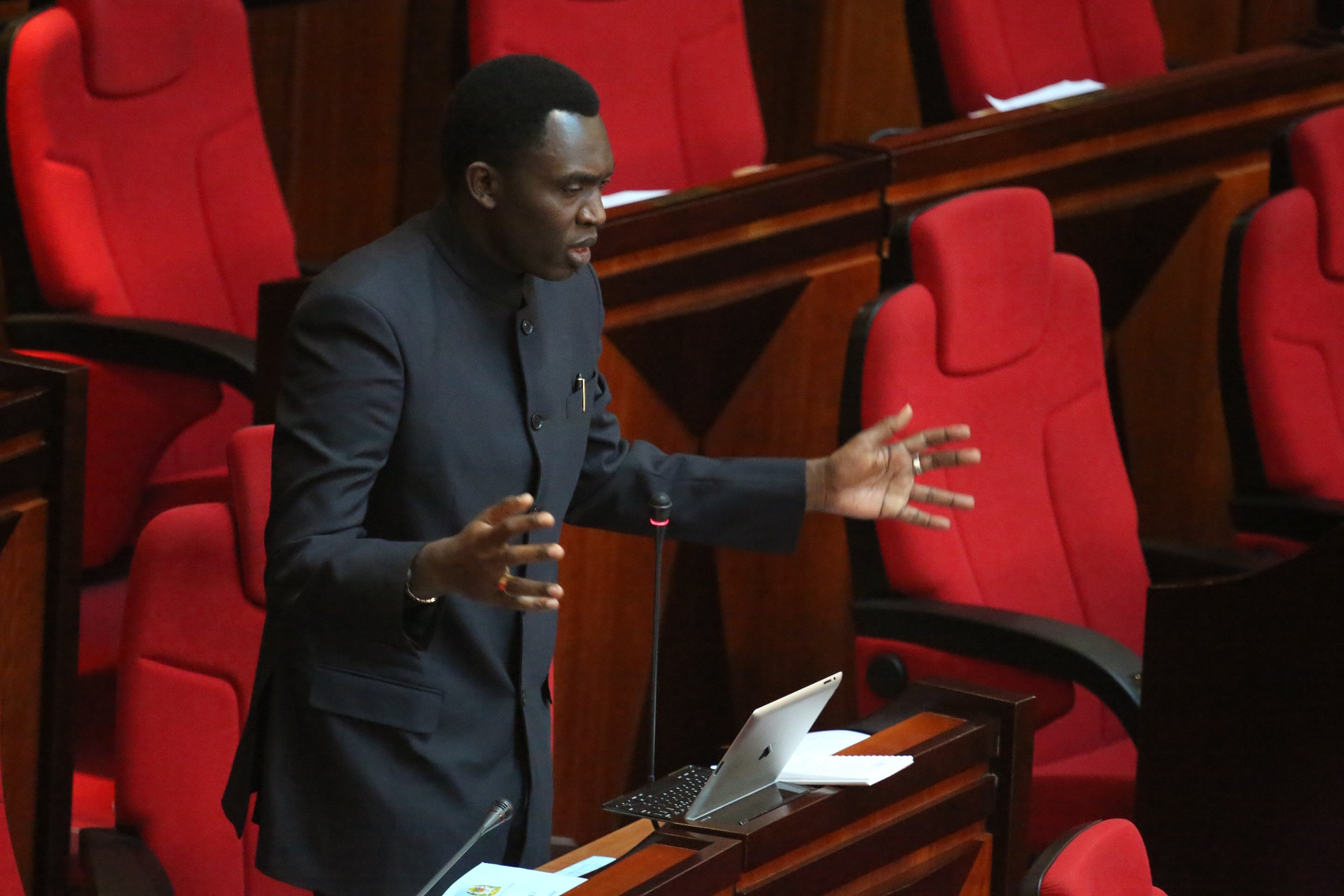
Hon. Kigwangalla addressing the parliament

The unicameral National Assembly of Tanzania or the Bunge has 393 seats — 264 elected by popular vote, 113 allocated to women chosen by their parties in proportion to their share of the electoral vote, 10 nominated by the president, five members chosen by the Zanzibar House of Representatives, and the Attorney General as an ex officio member — all members serving five-year terms. In addition to enacting laws that apply to the entire United Republic of Tanzania, the Assembly enacts laws that apply only to the mainland. Zanzibar has its own House of Representatives to make laws especially for Zanzibar (the Zanzibar House of Representatives has 70 seats, directly elected by universal suffrage to serve five-year terms).

Wikipedia has a list of current members of the Bunge arranged in two ways, alphabetically by member and alphabetically by constituency.

Tanzania's National Assembly members are elected concurrently by direct popular vote for 5-year terms. The unicameral National Assembly elected in 2000 had 295 members. These 295 members included the Attorney General, five members elected from the Zanzibar House of Representatives to participate in the Parliament, the 48 special women's seats which were made up of 20% of the seats a particular party had in the House, 181 constituents seats of members of Parliament from the mainland, and 50 seats from Zanzibar, as well as seats for the 10 members of Parliament nominated by the President. The ruling CCM holds about 86% of the seats in the Assembly elected in 2005, and held 93% of seats in the previous Assembly elected in 2000.

Laws passed by the National Assembly are valid for Zanzibar only in specifically designated union matters. Zanzibar's House of Representatives has jurisdiction over all non-union matters. There are currently 76 members in the House of Representatives in Zanzibar, including 50 elected by the people, 10 appointed by the president of Zanzibar, 5 exofficio members, and an attorney general appointed by the president. In May 2002, the government increased the number of special seats allocated to women from 10 to 15, which will increase the number of House of Representatives members to 81. Ostensibly, Zanzibar's House of Representatives can make laws for Zanzibar without the approval of the union government as long as it does not involve union-designated matters. The terms of office for Zanzibar's president and House of Representatives also are 5 years. The semiautonomous relationship between Zanzibar and the union is a relatively unique system of government.

== Political parties ==
1. Chama Cha Mapinduzi or CCM (Revolutionary Party) - Benjamin Mkapa
2. Civic United Front or CUF - Seif Shariff Hamad
3. Chama cha Democracia na Maendeleo or CHADEMA - Freeman Aikaeli Mbowe (chairman)
4. Tanzania Labour Party or TLP - Augustine Lyatonga Mrema
5. United Democratic Party or UDP - John Cheyo
6. Democratic Party (unregistered) - Reverend Christopher Mtikila
7. National Convention for Construction and Reform-Mageuzi or NCCR-Mageuzi - James Mbatia
8. Union for Multiparty Democracy or UMD - Abdullah Fundikira

Major opposition parties were effectively excluded from contesting the 2025 election, with key figures barred from standing and some party leaders detained on various charges in the lead‑up to the vote, contributing to questions about the inclusiveness of the political process.

== Elections ==
In the general election held on 29 October 2025, President Samia Suluhu Hassan was declared the winner with nearly 98% of the vote and secured a second five‑year term, following the barring of major opposition candidates and reports of protests and unrest after the vote.

Following the 29 October 2025 election, widespread protests erupted in major cities, including Dar es Salaam and Dodoma, with demonstrators contesting the fairness of the vote. Government authorities imposed nighttime curfews and security forces used force to quell unrest as restrictions on public gatherings were enforced.

== Judicial branch ==
Tanzania has a five-level judiciary, which comprises the jurisdictions of tribal, Islamic, and British common law.

In mainland Tanzania, appeal is from the Primary Courts through the District Courts and Resident Magistrate Courts, to the High Courts, ending in the federal Court of Appeal. The Zanzibar court system parallels the legal system of Mainland Tanzania, and all cases tried in Zanzibari courts, except for those involving constitutional issues and Islamic law, can be appealed to the Court of Appeals of the union.

The Judges of the Court of Appeal and the High Court are appointed by the President. Judges of more junior courts are appointed by the Chief Justice.

A commercial court was established in September 1999 as a division of the High Court.

== Administrative divisions ==
For administrative purposes, Tanzania is divided into 30 regions—25 in the mainland and 5 on Zanzibar. Ninety-nine districts have been created to further increase local authority. These districts are also now referred to as local government authorities. Currently there are 114 councils operating in 99 districts, 22 are urban and 92 are rural. The 22 urban units are classified further as city (Dar es Salaam and Mwanza), municipal (Arusha, Bukoba, Dodoma, Iringa, Kigoma-Ujiji, Lindi, Moshi, Mbeya, Morogoro, Musoma, Mtwara-Mikindani, Singida, Shinyanga, Tabora, and Tanga), and town councils.

== See also ==
- Freedom of speech in Tanzania
