= 2012 Arumeru East by-election =

← 2010	1 April 2012	2015 →

The Arumeru East constituency in the Tanzanian Parliament
- Turnout: 60,699 (47.64%)
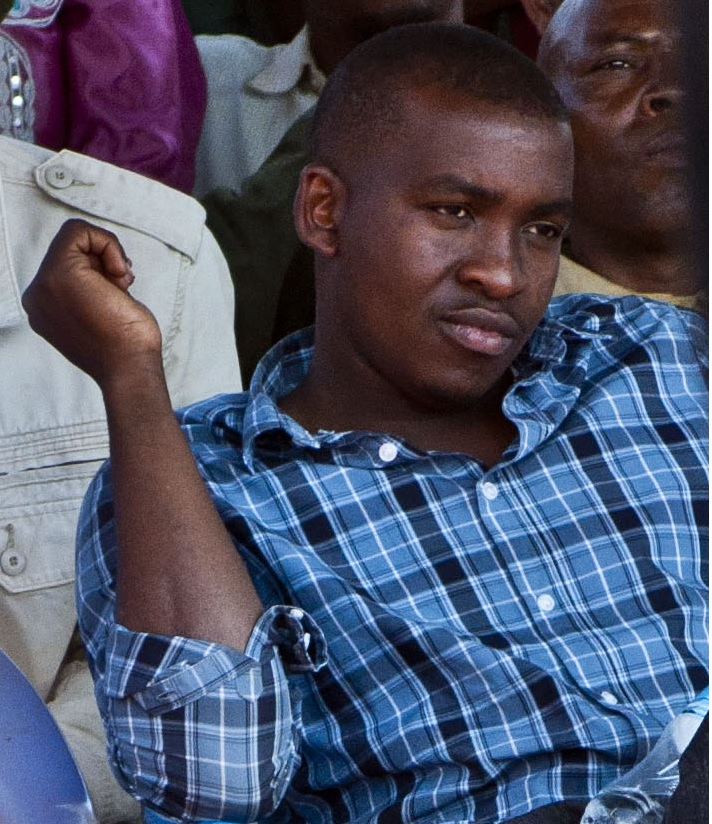

Candidate	Joshua Nassari	Siyoi Sumari
Party	Chadema	CCM
Popular vote	32,972	26,757
Percentage	54.92	44.57
MP before election
Jeremiah Sumari
CCM
Elected MP
Joshua Nassari
Chadema

The Arumeru East by-election was a by-election held for the Tanzanian parliamentary constituency of Arumeru East. It was triggered by the death of Jeremiah Sumari, the previous Member of Parliament (MP) who had held the seat for the Chama Cha Mapinduzi since 2005. The by-election took place on 1 April 2012 and the Chadema candidate won by 54.92%.

== Results ==
Election	Political result	Candidate	Party	Votes	%	±%
Arumeru East by-election, 2012; Death of Jeremiah Sumari; 661 spoilt votes Electorate: 127,425; Turnout: 60,699 (47.64%) +3.93	Chadema gain from CCM; Majority: 6,215 (10.35%)	Joshua Nassari	Chadema	32,972	54.92	+20.59
Arumeru East by-election, 2012; Death of Jeremiah Sumari; 661 spoilt votes Electorate: 127,425; Turnout: 60,699 (47.64%) +3.93	Chadema gain from CCM; Majority: 6,215 (10.35%)	Siyoi Sumari	CCM	26,757	44.57	–17.66
Arumeru East by-election, 2012; Death of Jeremiah Sumari; 661 spoilt votes Electorate: 127,425; Turnout: 60,699 (47.64%) +3.93	Chadema gain from CCM; Majority: 6,215 (10.35%)	Mazengo Adamu	AFP	139	0.23	-
Arumeru East by-election, 2012; Death of Jeremiah Sumari; 661 spoilt votes Electorate: 127,425; Turnout: 60,699 (47.64%) +3.93	Chadema gain from CCM; Majority: 6,215 (10.35%)	Muhammad A. Muhammad	DP	77	0.13	-
Arumeru East by-election, 2012; Death of Jeremiah Sumari; 661 spoilt votes Electorate: 127,425; Turnout: 60,699 (47.64%) +3.93	Chadema gain from CCM; Majority: 6,215 (10.35%)	Hamisi Kiemi	NRA	35	0.06	-
Arumeru East by-election, 2012; Death of Jeremiah Sumari; 661 spoilt votes Electorate: 127,425; Turnout: 60,699 (47.64%) +3.93	Chadema gain from CCM; Majority: 6,215 (10.35%)	Kirita Moyo	SAU	22	0.04	-
Arumeru East by-election, 2012; Death of Jeremiah Sumari; 661 spoilt votes Electorate: 127,425; Turnout: 60,699 (47.64%) +3.93	Chadema gain from CCM; Majority: 6,215 (10.35%)	Chipaka Moova	TLP	18	0.03	–0.13
Arumeru East by-election, 2012; Death of Jeremiah Sumari; 661 spoilt votes Electorate: 127,425; Turnout: 60,699 (47.64%) +3.93	Chadema gain from CCM; Majority: 6,215 (10.35%)	Charles Msuya	UPDP	18	0.03	–0.13
