= Anna Mghwira =

Tanzanian politician (1959–2021)

Regional Commissioner Kilimanjaro Region
- In office 2016–2021
- Appointed by: John Magufuli
- Preceded by: Leonidas Gama
- Succeeded by: Nicholas Kigaigai

Personal details
- Born: 23 January 1959 Mungumaji, Tanganyika (now Tanzania)
- Died: 22 July 2021 (aged 62) Mount Meru Hospital, Arusha
- Party: ACT-Wazalendo
- Other political affiliations: CHADEMA

Anna Elisha Mghwira (23 January 1959 – 22 July 2021) was a Tanzanian politician and the one-time chair of the Alliance for Change and Transparency (ACT), the youngest political party in Tanzania. She was educated in the United Kingdom at the University of Essex and the University of Dar es Salaam as well as Tumaini University.

In 2015, she was the sole female candidate to contest the presidential seat in Tanzania's general election in October that year.

== Early life and education ==
Anna Elisha Mghwira was born on 23 January 1959 at Singida Regional Hospital, Mungumaji Ward - Irao Suburb in Singida-Urban Municipality, Tanganyika. She spent her early years as a child at home due to a health problem which delayed her ability to walk. She joined Nyerere Primary school from 1968 to 1974. She then went to Ihanja Secondary school from 1975 to 1978 before joining the Lutheran Seminary for her advanced level from secondary education 1979 to 1981. She attained her bachelor's degree in Theology from Tumaini University before joining the University of Dar es Salaam, where she attained an LL.B. degree in 1986. She went to the University of Essex in England, where she attained a master's degree in law (LLM) in 2000. Mghwira worked for international and local organisations dealing with women's empowerment, community development, and refugees.

Her father was a councillor through TANU. Mghwira was creative with her hands and used her skills in braiding hair and crochet work to contribute to her school fees for her two years of secondary education. Some of her products were sold in the United States by one of her teachers, earning her US$1,200. Shortly the handicraft turned profitable after her clients learnt of her skills and decided to donate more (apart from purchasing her products) for her school fees up to “A” level.

== Activism and political life ==
Mgwhira's political journey started during the TANU era, when she was a member of the party's youth league. However she reduced her participation in politics in the late 1970s so that she could concentrate on her education, career, and family.

She returned to active politics in 2009, when she joined the centre-right political party Chama cha Demokrasia na Maendeleo, Swahili for Party for Democracy and Progress (Chadema). Ms Mghwira held various positions in the party, notably as district secretary and later as district chairwoman.

In 2012, she lost to Mr Joshua Nassari in the Chadema nomination for the Arumeru East constituency by-election. She unsuccessfully ran for a seat in the East African Legislative Assembly the same year.

In March 2015, she left Chadema for the newly formed ACT-Wazalendo, where she was later nominated the party's national chairwoman during the party's first general congress.

In December 2017, she left ACT-Wazalendo for Chama Cha Mapinduzi (CCM).

She served as Regional Commissioner of the Kilimanjaro region from 2017 May 2021, when she announced her retirement from the position. She was succeeded by Stephen Kagaigai.

On 22 July 2021, Anna Mghwira died in Mount Meru Hospital at the age of 62 years.
