= 2025 Tanzanian general election =

- 29 October 2025
- Registered: 37,647,235
- Presidential election

Nominee	Samia Suluhu Hassan	Mwalim Salum Juma
Party	CCM	CHAUMMA
Running mate	Emmanuel Nchimbi	Devotha Mathew Minja
Popular vote	31,913,866	213,414
Percentage	97.66%	0.65%
President before election
Samia Suluhu Hassan
CCM
Elected President
Samia Suluhu Hassan
CCM

General elections were held in Tanzania on 29 October 2025 to elect the President, members of the National Assembly and ward councillors. Samia Suluhu Hassan, the incumbent president and leader of the ruling Chama Cha Mapinduzi (CCM), who became president after the death of President John Magufuli in 2021, ran for a second term.

The election campaign was considered fraudulent by foreign observers after the two largest opposition parties, Chadema and Alliance for Change and Transparency, were barred from participating earlier in 2025; this was a sharp break with recent Tanzanian history, with major opposition parties having participated in every national election since the shift to multiparty elections in 1995. On Election Day, protests began over the results of the election and the increasing authoritarianism of Suluhu. The election was by far the deadliest in Tanzanian history, with numerous sources reporting hundreds of deaths and Chadema claiming to have verified 1,000–2,000 deaths.

== Background ==
In 2024, the government introduced new electoral laws—the Presidential, Parliamentary and Councillors’ Elections Act, 2024 and the Independent National Electoral Commission Act. These laws were intended to improve transparency and streamline electoral procedures. Supporters argued the reforms enhanced order and predictability in the electoral system, but critics contended they maintained government influence over the electoral commission and failed to guarantee a truly level playing field.

== Electoral system ==
The President of Tanzania is elected by plurality voting; the candidate who receives the most votes is elected. Article 39(1) of the 1977 constitution requires candidates to be Tanzanian citizens by birth, at least 40 years old, be nominated by a political party of which they are a member, be qualified to be an MP or a member of the Zanzibar House of Representatives, and not have any convictions related to tax evasion.

== Candidates ==
In January 2025, the ruling Chama Cha Mapinduzi (CCM) party nominated incumbent president Samia Suluhu Hassan as its presidential candidate for the election and Emmanuel Nchimbi as her running mate.

On 12 April 2025, the opposition Chadema party was disqualified from competing in the election after the Independent National Electoral Commission (INEC) said it had failed to sign a code of conduct document that was due on 12 April. This occurred only days after Chadema chairman Tundu Lissu was arrested on charges of incitement and treason after calling for electoral reforms at a rally in Mbinga on 9 April. On 12 April, he was disqualified from participating in the election.

Suluhu's candidacy was confirmed on 27 August 2025 by INEC, which also approved the candidacies of 16 other presidential candidates. On 15 September, candidate Luhaga Mpina of Alliance for Change and Transparency (ACT) was also barred from running, in a reversal of a decision the previous week allowing his candidacy; the decision was based on the allegation that the party had failed to comply with nomination procedures in the primaries. Opposition participation was limited after Chadema and ACT were barred, leaving CCM largely unchallenged.

== Campaign ==
The campaign period officially began on 28 August and ended shortly before the polling day.

The ruling CCM promoted President Samia Suluhu Hassan’s record on infrastructure, education, and stability. Opposition participation was limited after Chadema and Alliance for Change and Transparency were barred, leaving CCM largely unchallenged.

Observers, including Human Rights Watch, reported restrictions on opposition activity, harassment of critics, and limited access to independent media. State-aligned outlets gave wide coverage to CCM, while independent media faced regulatory pressure.

In the lead up to the elections, analysts noted a growing influence of social media in shaping political discourse and mobilising young voters. Platforms such as TikTok, and Facebook were widely used for campaign messaging, voter education, and civic engagement. However, observers also warned about the spread of misinformation and unverified claims online. Shortly before the polling day, access to the social media platform X was reportedly restricted nationwide, with full access reserved for government officials. Critics argued that the move limited online civic participation and reduced the flow of information during the final days of the campaign.

== Conduct ==
Reporting on the election campaign noted that the election was occurring under an increasingly authoritarian incumbent government. Freedom House ranked Tanzania as "not free" in 2024, a decline from "partly free" from 2020.

The 2025 Tanzanian general election was organised under the supervision of INEC, which oversaw voter registration, candidate nomination, and polling logistics. INEC reported that more than 37 million voters were registered nationwide, an increase compared to 2020 figures. Civil society groups praised improvements in the use of biometric voter verification but expressed concern over uneven access to voter education and allegations of partisan influence in electoral administration.

Security forces maintained a visible presence in major cities and polling centres. While authorities stated this was necessary to ensure order, opposition parties and human rights organisations accused the government of using intimidation tactics against supporters and observers. International partners, including the United Nations and the African Union, called for calm and urged all parties to respect the rule of law and the independence of electoral institutions.

In the final week before the election, several opposition leaders were arrested. Authorities said the arrests were related to alleged threats to national security, while opposition figures and human rights organisations condemned them as politically motivated attempts to weaken the opposition. The actions drew criticism from international observers and further heightened concerns about the fairness of the electoral process.

In the run-up to the election, analysts also described the political climate as largely uncompetitive. With opposition leader Tundu Lissu facing treason charges and ACT-Wazalendo candidate Luhaga Mpina disqualified, President Samia Suluhu Hassan faced little effective challenge. Observers noted that limited political space and institutional bias had undermined public confidence in the process.

According to Human Rights Watch, the Tanzanian media was stifled by the incumbent government and failed to ensure the electoral commission’s independence.

=== Media and press freedom ===
Some foreign journalists reported being denied accreditation, with CNN correspondent Larry Madowo stating that Tanzania "does not like independent critical reporting" and has made accreditation for foreign media difficult to obtain.

=== Unrest and protests ===
Election day saw unrest in Dar es Salaam, Mbeya, and Tunduma, with clashes between police and protesters prompting a curfew in Dar es Salaam. Reports indicated injuries, property damage, and a nationwide internet disruption, while voter turnout in some cities appeared low amid security concerns. Internet connectivity was also severely disrupted, as reports indicated a nearly nationwide shutdown of online access. On 30 October, police in Dar es Salaam fired shots and used tear gas to disperse protesters who defied a curfew, as unrest continued despite the internet shutdown. As of 31 October, authorities have not lifted internet restrictions imposed during election day and directed government employees to work from home, according to media reports. The curfew was lifted on 4 November.

On 31 October, first Kenyan and then international media reported that opposition sources were claiming that around 700 people had been killed nationwide. The Office of the United Nations High Commissioner for Human Rights reported at least 10 confirmed deaths and expressed concern over the use of live ammunition.

On 5 November, the opposition party Chadema claimed that the number of protest deaths that they had documented had risen from 700, as reported on 31 October, to 2,000. They also claimed that the true death toll was even higher, accusing police of disposing of hundreds of unknown bodies at an undisclosed location.

== Observers and oversight ==
For the first time in recent elections, Tanzania limited the participation of regional and international observer missions. Organisations such as the Southern African Development Community (SADC) and the East African Community (EAC) were not fully accredited to observe the process. Analysts from the Institute for Security Studies noted that the absence of international observers could affect transparency and undermine public confidence in the results. However, in late October 2025 both SADC and EAC deployed election observation missions to Tanzania ahead of the polls, signalling a change in their participation. On 31 October, the African National Congress reported that its delegation was unable to observe the election after internet shutdown on polling day and during the vote-counting period prevented effective monitoring of the process.

A parliamentary delegation from the Great Lakes Region arrived in Tanzania on 23 October, composed of 23 lawmakers and election experts from six countries including Burundi and Angola. The delegation, operating under the International Conference on the Great Lakes Region, stressed its task to monitor media freedom, campaign conduct, security and rights during the election.

Amnesty International warned that the elections "risk becoming a procedural affair devoid of legitimacy", citing politically-motivated charges against opponents of the government, the government's efforts to instill a climate of fear and increased repression of the opposition, journalists and civil society, and 83 disappearances of opposition party members during the campaign period. However, the Tanzanian government dismissed the allegations as “unsubstantiated and misleading”, reaffirming its commitment to human rights, the rule of law, and constitutional guarantees. Officials stated that claims of enforced disappearances and political repression were inconsistent with the country’s legal framework and urged rights groups to engage directly with authorities before publishing reports.

On 3 November, SADC election observers released a preliminary statement declaring that the 29 October elections in Tanzania did not meet the organisation’s standards for a credible, free and fair process, citing intimidation, restricted political participation and serious deficits in transparency. The following day, the European Union expressed serious concerns over the elections, citing violence, an internet shutdown, and reported irregularities. It noted a lack of a level playing field marked by abductions, disappearances and intimidation, and urged authorities to exercise restraint, release detained politicians, and investigate all reported incidents. African Union observers also reported that the election did not meet its electoral standards, citing irregularities and limited observer access, noting that some voters were issued multiple ballots and were allowed to vote without identity verification against the registry.

== Results ==
Early reports from election day indicated that voter turnout was significantly lower than expected, particularly among young voters, amid widespread public apathy and the absence of major opposition contenders.

On 1 November, INEC declared that Suluhu had won the election, receiving 97.66% of the vote. Foreign news media, such as the BBC and the Daily Nation, pointed to the very high percentage of votes for Suluhu—as well as the claim that Suluhu received than 31.9 million votes, a turnout of 82%, while Suluhu's predecessor, John Magufuli, received only 12.5 million votes in the 2020 election—as evidence of electoral fraud. In her victory speech on 1 November, Suluhu said the election was "free and democratic", accused protesters of being "unpatriotic," and stated that "we will take all actions and involve all security agencies to ensure the country is peaceful."

On 3 November, Suluhu was sworn in to her new term as president, with the ceremony being held in a military parade ground in Dodoma, instead of a stadium as in previous years.

=== President ===
Candidate	Running mate	Party	Votes	%
Samia Suluhu Hassan	Emmanuel John Nchimbi	Chama Cha Mapinduzi	31,913,866	97.66
Mwalim Salum Juma	Devota Mathew Minja	Chama cha Ukombozi wa Umma	213,414	0.65
Gombo Samandito Gombo	Husna Mohamed Abdalla	Civic United Front	164,050	0.50
Almas Hassan Kisabya	Ali Khamis Hassan	National Reconstruction Alliance	99,396	0.30
Coaster Jimmy Kibonde	Azza Haji Suleiman	Chama Cha Makini	59,117	0.18
Kunje Ngombale Mwiru	Chum Juma Abdalla	Alliance for African Farmers Party	42,457	0.13
Abdul Juma Mluya	Sadoun Abrahman Khatib	Democratic Party	26,257	0.08
Ambar Khamis Haji	Evaline Wilbard Munisi	NCCR–Mageuzi	25,190	0.08
Saum Hussein Rashid	Juma Khamisi Faki	United Democratic Party	21,964	0.07
Doyo Hassan Doyo	Chausiku Khatib Mohammed	National League for Democracy	18,037	0.06
Rwamugira Mbatina Yustas	Amana Suleiman Mzee	Tanzania Labour Party	17,583	0.05
Bussungu Georges Gabriel	Makame Ali Issa	African Democratic Alliance Party	14,377	0.04
Mwajuma Noty Mirambo	Mashavu Alawi Haji	Union for Multiparty Democracy	13,814	0.04
Kyara Majalio Paul	Satia Mussa Bebwa	Sauti ya Umma	13,203	0.04
Wilson Elias Mulumbe	Shoka Khamis Juma	Alliance for Democratic Change	12,898	0.04
Mwaijojele David Daud	Masoud Ali Abdalla	Chama Cha Kijamii	12,516	0.04
Twalib Ibrahim Kadege	Abdalla Mohamed Khamis	United People's Democratic Party	10,705	0.03
Total			32,678,844	100.00
Registered voters/turnout			37,647,235	–
Source: EATV

Participation = 86,80%

=== National Assembly ===
Party	Votes	%	Seats			
Party	Votes	%	Constituency	Women	Total	+/−
Chama Cha Mapinduzi			270	113	383	+33
Alliance for Change and Transparency			2	0	2	–3
Chama cha Ukombozi wa Umma			0	2	2	+2
Presidential appointees			–	–	10	0
Elected by Zanzibar House of Representatives			–	–	5	0
Attorney-General			–	–	1	0
Total			272	115	403	+10
Registered voters/turnout	37,647,235	–				
Source: IPU, INEC
