= Heche (disambiguation) =

Heche is a small village in Karnataka state, India.

It may also refer to:

== People ==
In Europe, the surname Heche (variants Hêche, Héche, Hèche), while not a common name, is found throughout France, Switzerland, and Germany. An unrelated East African surname Heche (or Hechei) is found in Kenya and Tanzania.

Notable people with this surname include:

- Anne Heche (1969–2022), American actress
- Claude Hêche (born 1952), Swiss politician
- John Heche, Tanzanian politician
- Nancy Heche (born 1937), American conservative activist, mother of Anne

== Places ==
- Pic de la Hèche Castet, part of the Néouvielle Massif, in the Pyrenees mountains in southern France

== See also ==
- Hèches
