= Ridhiwani Kikwete =

Tanzanian lawyer and politician

Honourable Ridhiwani Jakaya Kikwete MP

Member of Parliament for Chalinze
- Incumbent
- Assumed office 6 May 2014
- Preceded by: Saidi Bwanamdogo
- Majority: 20,8012 (86.44%)

Personal details
- Born: 16 April 1979 (age 47)
- Party: CCM
- Spouse: Arafa (m. 2008)
- Children: 4
- Parent: Jakaya Mrisho Kikwete
- Education: UDSM (LL.B); University of Hull (PGCert)
- Profession: Lawyer

Ridhiwani Jakaya Kikwete (born 16 April 1979) is a Tanzanian lawyer and CCM politician. He is currently a Minister of President’s Office (Public Service Management and Good Governance) in Tanzania. Member of Parliament for Chalinze Constituency (CCM).

== Early life and career ==
He was educated at Shaaban Robert Secondary and Mkwawa Secondary schools. He then joined the University of Dar es Salaam and graduated with an LLB. He has Master in International Relations from University of Dodoma (2023)

=== Political career ===
Ridhiwani is a member of the governing Chama Cha Mapinduzi. In March 2014, he succeeded in being nominated to contest for the Chalinze by-election following the death of Saidi Bwanamdogo. He received 758 (55.6%) of the 1,368 votes cast in the party's internal opinion poll. In April 2014 he won in a landslide victory by more than 86% in Chalinze constituency by-election. In January 2022, he was appointed Deputy Minister of land, housing and human settlements.

== Personal life ==
He is the firstborn of fourth president of Tanzania, Jakaya Kikwete. He married Arafa in 2008.
