= Corruption in Tanzania =

Corruption in Tanzania, both grand and petty, remains a pervasive problem, despite comprehensive laws in place. It is largely due to weak internal control and low or non-compliance with anti-corruption regulations within different government agencies. For instance, public procurement, taxation, and customs service are areas that are prone to corruption.

On Transparency International's 2025 Corruption Perceptions Index, Tanzania scored 40 on a scale from 0 ("highly corrupt") to 100 ("very clean"). When ranked by score, Tanzania ranked 84th among the 182 countries in the Index, where the country ranked first is perceived to have the most honest public sector. For comparison with regional scores, the best score among sub-Saharan African countries (Note: Angola, Benin, Botswana, Burkina Faso, Burundi, Cameroon, Cape Verde, Central African Republic, Chad, Comoros, Côte d'Ivoire, Democratic Republic of the Congo, Djibouti, Equatorial Guinea, Eritrea, Eswatini, Ethiopia, Gabon, Gambia, Ghana, Guinea, Guinea-Bissau, Kenya, Lesotho, Liberia, Madagascar, Malawi, Mali, Mauritania, Mauritius, Mozambique, Namibia, Niger, Nigeria, Republic of the Congo, Rwanda, Sao Tome and Principe, Senegal, Seychelles, Sierra Leone, Somalia, South Africa, South Sudan, Sudan, Tanzania, Togo, Uganda, Zambia, and Zimbabwe.) was 68, the average was 32 and the worst was 9. For comparison with worldwide scores, the best score was 89 (ranked 1), the average was 42, and the worst was 9 (ranked 181, in a two-way tie).

== Economic corruption ==
Foreign companies have identified that corruption within those sectors poses potential obstacles to doing business in Tanzania as bribes are often demanded. It is also believed that the existing large informal sector, 48.1% of GDP, is associated with a cumbersome business registration process which has created opportunities for corruption.

== Political corruption ==
President John Magufuli launched a campaign against grand corruption and established a special court to handle the matter. As a result, corrupt officials were fired. These efforts and similar projects are internationally supported by Germany and the European Union. Before he died in office in March 2021, there were fears that such anti-corruption efforts would end when President Magufuli stepped down.

In April 2025, Tanzania's Independent National Elections Commission (INEC) barred the main opposition party, Chadema, from contesting the October general elections, citing its failure to sign a mandatory electoral code of conduct. The decision also disqualified the party from all by-elections until 2030. Days earlier, Chadema chairman Tundu Lissu, a prominent critic of the ruling Chama cha Mapinduzi (CCM) party and President Samia Suluhu Hassan, was charged with treason for allegedly inciting rebellion against the elections. Chadema had signaled its intent to boycott the polls unless electoral reforms were enacted. Human rights groups have linked these developments to a broader pattern of political repression, though the government denies any wrongdoing.

== See also ==
- Tanzania Corruption Profile from the Business Anti-Corruption Portal
