= Mariam Omar =

Mariam Omar may refer to:

- Mariam Omar (politician)
- Mariam Omar (synchronized swimmer)
