= Ruth Hiyob Mollel =

Tanzanian politician and former civil servant

Member of the National Assembly of Tanzania
- In office 29 October 2015 – October 2020

Personal details
- Born: 6 January 1951 (age 75) Dar es Salaam, Tanzania
- Party: Chadema
- Occupation: Politician

Ruth Hiyob Mollel (born 6 January 1951) is a former senior civil servant from Tanzania, who became a politician with the Chadema party after her retirement, and was a member of the National Assembly of Tanzania between 2015 and 2020.

== Early life and education ==
Ruth Hiyob Mollel was born in Dar es Salaam on 6 January 1951. She attended the Kisarawe Lutheran Primary School and the Jangwani Girls Secondary School in Dar es Salaam, before transferring to the Korogwe Girls Secondary School, a boarding school situated north of Dar es Salaam and due west of Tanga. She obtained a Bachelor of Arts in education from the University of Dar es Salaam in 1975 and a postgraduate diploma from the University of Ghana at Legon in 1977. Two decades later, she obtained a master's degree in human resource management from the University of Manchester in England.

== Career ==
Between 1975 and 1980, Mollel worked as an archivist at Tanzania's then Ministry of Youth and Culture. From 1981 to 1982 she worked at the United States Embassy as a translator. Between 1983 and 1993 she was employed by the Ministry of Health as a human resources officer, moving in 1994 to the president's office as the principal human resources officer. Between 1995 and 2002 she was the director of the president's office, before moving to the Ministry of Higher Education, Science and Technology as the permanent secretary. In 2006 she became the permanent secretary in the president's office, transferring to the same position in the vice-president's office in 1997. She retired in 2011.

== Political career ==
Mollel was elected to the National Assembly in the 2015 national election, for one of the 113 seats reserved for women. After the election, her party, Chadema, formed the opposition to the Chama Cha Mapinduzi government. She became chief spokesperson of the official opposition bloc in the parliament. She was a leading campaigner for good governance and against corruption. In 2016 she called a press conference to complain about the government's inability to address the widespread problem of people on the government payroll who did not do any work, because they had died or for other reasons. In January 2018, she was one of eleven members of the House of Assembly appointed to a committee to probe flaws in the law and policies governing the gas subsector, in response to a public outcry at the lack of benefits being seen by people from the exploration and exploitation of natural gas.
