= Alliance for Democratic Change =

Political party in Tanzania

Alliance for Democratic Change Umoja wa Mabadiliko ya Demokrasia (Swahili)
- Abbreviation: ADC
- Leader: Hamad Rashid Mohamed
- Founded: 2012
- Split from: Civic United Front
- Colours
- Bunge: 0 / 384
- Zanzibar HoR: 1 / 85

The Alliance for Democratic Change (ADC) is a political party in Tanzania.

== Election results ==
=== Presidential elections ===
Election	Party candidate	Votes	%	Result
2005	Paul Henry Kyara	16.414	0.14%	Lost ✗
2015	Lutalosa Yembe	66,049	0.43%	Lost ✗
2020	Queen Cuthbert Sendiga	7,627	0.05%	Lost ✗
2025	Wilson Elias Mulumbe	12,898	0.04%	Lost ✗
