= Chama cha Ukombozi wa Umma =

Political party in Tanzania

People's Liberation Party Chama cha Ukombozi wa Umma
- Abbreviation: CHAUMMA
- Chairman: Hashim Rungwe Spunda (2014—present)
- Secretary-General: Ali Omary Juma
- Founder: Hashim Rungwe Spunda
- Founded: 2013
- Split from: NCCR–Mageuzi
- Colours
- Bunge: 2 / 403

Election symbol
- A raised fist over a red, black, and yellow flag similar in design to Tanzania's flag

Website
- chaumma.com (archived)

The Chama cha Ukombozi wa Umma (CHAUMMA lit. 'People's Liberation Party') is a political party in Tanzania. Hashim Spunda Rungwe, chairman of CHAUMMA since 2014, was the first politician in the party's history to run for president when he stood in the 2015 Tanzanian general election. Many CHAUMMA members were previously aligned with NCCR-Mageuzi, including Rungwe, who unsuccessfully contested for president as the NCCR-Mageuzi candidate in the 2010 Tanzanian general election. Rungwe states that CHAUMMA's participation in elections depends on whether the dominant political party, CCM, allows an even playing field for opposition parties. The party's main objectives are increasing happiness, decreasing unemployment, and revitalizing the economy.

== 2015 general election ==
Hashim Rungwe was selected as CHAUMMA's first-ever presidential candidate during the 2015 general election instead of General Secretary Ally Omary Juma and another party member. Some of the main policies Rungwe wanted to focus on were government accountability, national unity, and better support for the impoverished. If elected, he would specifically revive Mwanza's struggling economy by returning failing private companies to public ownership. He believed that the government was responsible for ensuring the quality of infrastructure and the financial success of its citizens, and that revitalization of the cotton-growing industry would decrease poverty and unemployment rates. A longer-term plan is to provide free education to all Tanzanians from nursery school to university and that the country's eventual wealth in resources would make it possible.

== 2019 civic election ==
Along with candidates from a number of other opposition parties, 250 CHAUMMA candidates withdrew from the civic election following claims of nomination irregularities.

== 2020 general election ==
Rungwe represented CHAUMMA in the 2020 Tanzanian general election. His priority in this election was eliminating hunger, particularly through the creation of children's food programs. He promised that anyone attending one of his rallies would be given a meal of chicken and rice but was quickly issued a warning from the Prevention and Combating of Corruption Bureau, stating this would be akin to bribery. Rungwe also showed interest in building a canal between Dar es Salaam and Dodoma to ease goods transportation and in replacing expensive government vehicles with more cost-effective alternatives.

== Election results ==
=== Presidential elections ===
| Election | Party candidate | Votes | % | Result |
|---|---|---|---|---|
| 2015 | Hashim Rungwe Spunda | 49,256 | 0.32% | Lost ✗ |
| 2020 | Hashim Rungwe Spunda | 32,878 | 0.22% | Lost ✗ |
| 2025 | Mwalim Salum Juma | 213,414 | 0.65% | Lost ✗ |
