= Hussein Abebe =

Mine owner from Tanzania

- Born: 1964 (age 61–62); Arusha, Tanzania
- Occupation: Mine owner

Hussein Abebe is a mine owner from Tanzania who US prosecutors claimed sold hundreds of pounds of TNT to Ahmed Ghailani, which were then used to bomb US embassies in Africa. Abebe's own capture, and his potential testimony against Ghailani, stirred controversy, as it followed confessions extracted from Ghailani under torture in Central Intelligence Agency black sites.

== Capture and detention in Tanzania ==
The New York Times reported that US and Tanzanian officials spent a year trying to find and identify Abebe, based on the information extracted from Ghailani. Ghailani's prosecutor's narrative was that, once located, Abebe acknowledged that he did sell TNT he had access to, for use in mining, and that when he sold TNT to Ghailani he believed it was for use in legitimate mining.

The Guelph Mercury reported that Abede had been working as a taxi driver when authorities found him.

== Potential role in Ghailani's trial ==
US District Court Judge Lewis A. Kaplan convened hearings to determine whether he should allow Abebe to testify in September 2010.

On September 19, 2010, The New York Times quoted Karen Greenberg, a law professor who specializes in National Security law, as stating the ruling over whether Abebe testimony would be allowed would set the precedent for all future testimony that derived from evidence extracted through torture in any future trials.

Courthouse News reported that Valentine Mlowola, the police officer who interrogated Abebe, made mistakes during his interrogation that contributed to Kaplan's decision to bar Abebe's testimony.

A motion filed by Ghailani's defense counsel, seeking a new trial, asserted that prosecutors used Abebe to "dupe" the court.
