= Valentine Mlowola =

Tanzanian official

- Occupations: Police officer, Civil servant
- Police career
- Allegiance: Tanzania
- Branch: Tanzania National Police
- Status: Active
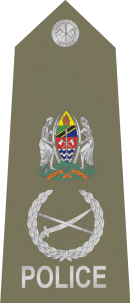
- Rank: Commissioner

Valentine Mlowola is a senior official with the Tanzanian government.

Mlowola received some of his police training overseas, in Egypt, the United Kingdom and the United States. He studied at the FBI academy in Quantico, and the National Defense University.

He was a Senior Superintendent with the Tanzanian Police. His interrogation of Hussein Abebe triggered discussion. US prosecutors had wanted to use Abebe's testimony to help prove their case against Ahmed Ghailani, and Mlowola's interrogation included what US District Court Judge Lewis Kaplan ruled were implied threats of continued detention if Abebe did not agree to testimony that would help convict Ghailani.

In 2006 Mlowola was made a Police Commissioner.

In December 2015 President Joseph Pombe Magufuli appointed Mlowola the Director General of the Prevention and Combating of Corruption Bureau (PCCB). He held that post until 2019.
