= Emmanuel Makaidi =

Tanzanian politician

Emmanuel Makaidi (April 10, 1941 - October 15, 2015) was a Tanzanian politician and chairman of the National League for Democracy (NLD).

He ran as NLD presidential candidate in the 14 December 2005 elections. He placed seventh out of ten candidates, receiving 0.19% of the vote.

He died on October 10, 2015, in Lindi Region, Tanzania, with stroke.
