= John Heche =

Tanzanian politician, activist, and former Member of Parliament

- Born: Tarime District
- Other name: Wegesa
- Citizenship: Tanzania
- Education: Mass communication
- Alma mater: St. Augustine University of Tanzania
- Occupation: Activist

John Wegesa Heche is a Tanzanian politician, activist, and former member of Parliament. He is a senior member of the opposition party Chadema and has been known for his outspoken stance on democratic reforms, anti-corruption, and youth empowerment.

== Early life and education ==
John Heche was born and raised in Tarime District, in the Mara Region of northern Tanzania. He began his formal education at Nyamaharaga Primary School, followed by secondary education at Bulima Secondary School. He later joined Bunda Teachers' Training College, where he earned a diploma in education in 2004.

Heche then enrolled at St. Augustine University of Tanzania, graduating in 2009 with a bachelor's degree in mass communication.

== Career ==
Before entering politics, Heche briefly worked as a teacher and later in the banking sector. He became involved in politics during his university years.

Heche officially joined Chadema in the mid-2000s and quickly rose to prominence within the party. He served as a member of the Tanzania National Assembly, representing Tarime Rural Constituency under Chadema.

Though no longer serving in the National Assembly, Heche continues to influence Tanzanian politics as a senior leader within Chadema.

== Political activism and arrest ==
Heche is known for his vocal criticism of the ruling government and his active participation in political demonstrations. This has led to several arrests and periods of detention.

In July 2021, Heche was arrested in Mwanza along with other CHADEMA leaders and members, on suspicion of "plotting to cause chaos". During his detention, concerns were raised about his health as he reportedly faced respiratory challenges and was initially denied medical treatment by the police but was subsequently released after pressure from human rights defenders and politicians.

In April 2025, Heche was arrested at a rally in Dar es Salaam. The demonstration was organized to support the party's leader, Tundu Lissu, who had also been detained.

== See also ==
- CHADEMA
- Politics of Tanzania
- List of Tanzanian politicians
- Tundu Lissu
- Freeman Mbowe
