= Joshua Nassari =

Tanzanian politician

Honourable Joshua Nassari MP
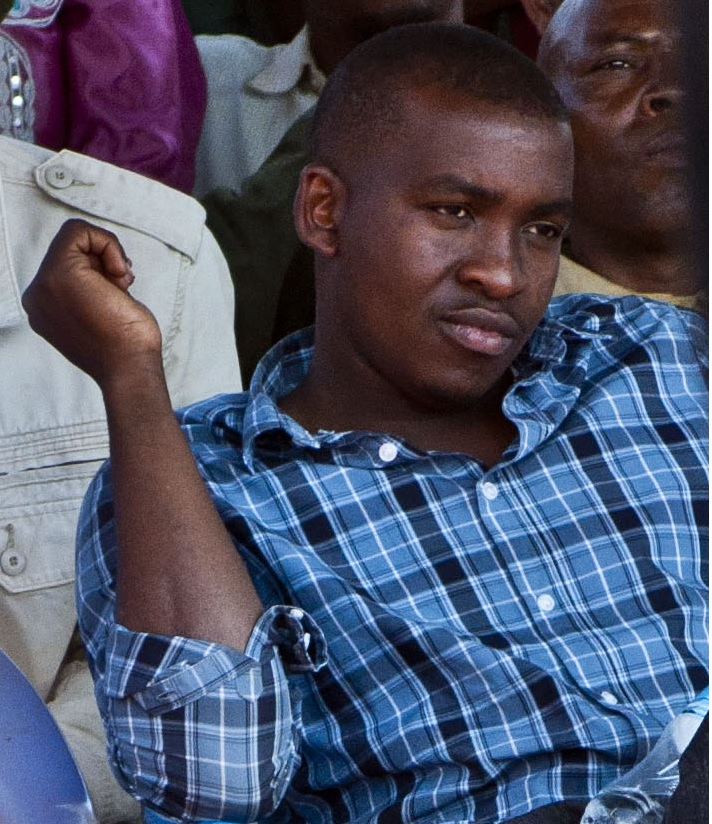

Member of Parliament for Arumeru East
- Incumbent
- Assumed office 12 April 2012
- Preceded by: Jeremiah Sumari
- Majority: 32,972 (54.92%)

Personal details
- Born: January 1985 (age 40–41)
- Party: CHADEMA

Joshua Samwel Nassari (January 1985) is a Tanzanian CHADEMA politician and Member of Parliament for Arumeru East constituency since 2012.
