= United People's Democratic Party =

Political party in Tanzania

The United People's Democratic Party (UPDP) is a political party in Tanzania. The party was registered on 4 February 1993.

The party didn't field a presidential candidate in the 14 December 2005 election, but supported Sengondo Mvungi of the National Convention for Construction and Reform-Mageuzi. He placed fifth out of ten candidates, winning 0.49% of the vote.

In the 2015 presidential election its candidate was Fahmi Dovutwa.

== Election results ==
=== Presidential elections ===
Election	Party candidate	Votes	%	Result
2010	Yahmi Nassoro Dovutwa	13,176	0.16%	Lost ✗
2015	Fahmi Nassoro Dovutwa	7,785	0.05%	Lost ✗
2020	Twalib Ibrahim Kadege	6,194	0.04%	Lost ✗
2025	Twalib Ibrahim Kadege	10,705	0.03%	Lost ✗
