= Mariam Omar (politician) =

Zanzibari politician

Mariam Omar is a Zanzibari politician and member of the Sauti ya Umma (SAU) party. Running as the SAU candidate in the 30 October 2005 Zanzibar presidential election, Omar finished last out of six candidates, receiving 0.07% of the vote. She is the first woman ever to contest the Zanzibar presidency.
