= Haji Mussa Kitole =

Zanzibari politician

Haji Mussa Kitole is a Zanzibari politician and member of the Jahazi Asilia party.

Running as the Jahazi Asilia candidate in the 30 October 2005 Zanzibar presidential election, Kitole placed 3rd out of six candidates, receiving 0.47% of the vote.
