= Jeremiah Sumari =

Tanzanian politician

Member of Parliament for Arumeru East
- In office December 2005 – 19 January 2012
- Preceded by: Talala Mbise
- Succeeded by: Joshua Nassari

Personal details
- Born: 2 March 1943 Akheri, Meru District, Arusha Region, Tanganyika
- Died: 19 January 2012 (aged 68) Dar es Salaam, Tanzania
- Resting place: Arusha
- Party: CCM
- Spouse: Miriam
- Children: Siyoi

Jeremiah Solomon Sumari (2 March 1943 – 19 January 2012) was a Tanzanian CCM politician and Member of Parliament for Arumeru East constituency from 2005 to 2012.
