= Paul Henry Kyara =

Tanzanian politician

- Died: 18th December, 2017; Dar es salaam
- Occupation: Politician
- Known for: 2005 Tanzania General Election Presidential Candidate
- Political party: Sauti ya Umma
- Relatives: Majalio Paul Kyara

Paul Henry Kyara was a Tanzanian politician and chairman of the Sauti ya Umma (SAU - people's voice) party.

kyara was nominated as sau presidential candidate in Tanzania general election, 14 December 2005, Kyara finished receiving 16, 380 votes.
