= 2015 Tanzanian constitutional referendum attempt =

Tanzanian constitutional referendum
- Do you accept the proposed constitution? Je, unaikubali katiba inayopendekezwa? (Swahili)

A constitutional referendum was planned to be held in Tanzania on 30 April 2015. However, delays to voter registration led to it being postponed, and as of 2021 the vote has still not been rescheduled.

== Background ==
Tanzania's existing constitution dates back to 1977. Efforts to rewrite it began in July 1998 under President Benjamin Mkapa, who created a constitutional reform committee.

In 2012 a Constitutional Review Commission was established to further work on a review of the constitution. It delivered a draft to President Jakaya Kikwete in December 2013. The draft was then presented to a Constituent Assembly consisting of MPs, members of the Zanzibar House of Representatives and more than 200 members of the public.

In April 2014 the three major opposition parties walked out of the Assembly, claiming their suggestions for reform were being ignored. In September of that year the assembly vote in favor of reforming the constitution.

The proposed new constitution included:

- The creation of an Independent Electoral Commission
- Allowing presidential election results to be legally challenged
- Limiting the number of ministers a president can appoint
- A requirement that there is a 50/50 split of men and women in the National Assembly
- Ensuring equal land ownership rights for women

== Referendum ==
A referendum on the new constitution was scheduled to take place on 30 April 2015. In late March, Jakaya Kikwete, the president of Tanzania, warned that the lead-up to the referendum was seeing increased tensions between Muslims and Christians that could lead to an increase in violence between followers of the two religions. In early April, the government announced that it was indefinitely postponing the referendum as it had not received enough "biometric voter registration kits" for the vote to take place.

In June 2016, the country's newly elected president, John Pombe Magufuli announced that his government will ensure that the constitutional referendum is accomplished while praising his predecessor for successfully initiating it. The National Electoral Commission's (NEC) Chairman (retired) Judge Damian Lubuva had also announced that the referendum process will resume by reviewing the Constitutional Referendum Act, 2013, after which, a date for the referendum will be officially announced by both the NEC and its Zanzibari counterpart ZEC.

As of 2020, the referendum is still supposed to occur at some point in the future, but no date has been announced.
