= Heche =

Village in Karnataka, India

Heche is a small village located in the Sorab panchayat town of Sagara, taluka in Shimoga district in the Indian state of Karnataka. It is close to Chandragutti, which has an ancient fort and temple. Heche has a few ancient temples, including the Kalikamba Temple, Eshwara (Pachalingeshwara) and Anjaneya temple.
