= Prevention and Combating of Corruption Bureau =

Tanzania's (PCCB) Prevention and Combating of Corruption Bureau was founded to find corrupt officials.

President Joseph Pombe Magufuli has been credited with strengthening the PCCB, which had previously been described as a "toothless dog". He appointed Valentine Mlowola, a former senior superintendent in the Tanzanian Police, as acting Director General, in 2015.
