= Leonard Shayo =

Tanzanian politician

Leonard Shayo (born 1948) is a Tanzanian politician and member of the Demokrasia Makini party from Kilimanjaro Region. Running as the party's presidential candidate in the 14 December 2005 elections, Shayo placed ninth out of ten candidates, receiving 0.15% of the vote.
