= Saidi Bwanamdogo =

Tanzanian politician

Honourable Saidi Bwanamdogo MP

Member of Parliament for Chalinze
- In office November 2010 – 22 January 2014
- Preceded by: Ramadhani Maneno

Personal details
- Born: 15 December 1968
- Died: 22 January 2014 (aged 45) Dar es Salaam, Tanzania
- Resting place: Miono, Bagamoyo District
- Party: CCM
- Education: University of Dar es Salaam

Saidi Ramadhani Bwanamdogo (15 December 1968 – 22 January 2014) was a Tanzanian CCM politician and Member of Parliament for Chalinze constituency from 2010 until his death at age 45 in January 2014.
