= Sauti ya Umma =

Political party in Tanzania

People's Voice
- Founded: 17 February 2005
- Headquarters: Zanzibar

Sauti ya Umma (SAU, People's Voice) is a political party in Tanzania. The party was registered on 17 February 2005.

In elections for the Zanzibar Presidency and House of Representatives on 30 October 2005, SAU presidential candidate Mariam Omar won 0.07% of the vote. The party failed to win any seats in concurrent House of Assembly elections.

In elections held on 14 December 2005, SAU presidential candidate Paul Henry Kyara placed last out of ten candidates, winning 0.14% of the vote. The party failed to win any seats in National Assembly elections held on the same day.

== Electoral history ==
=== Presidential elections ===
Election	Party candidate	Votes	%	Result
2005	Paul Henry Kyara	16.414	0.14%	Lost ✗
2010	Did not participate			
2015	Did not participate			
2020	Muttamwega Bhatt Mgaywa	14,922	0.10%	Lost ✗
2025	Kyara Majalio Paul	13,203	0.04%	Lost ✗
