= Sengondo Mvungi =

Tanzanian politician and academic

- Born: 1952; Kilimanjaro Region, Tanzania
- Died: 12 November 2013 (aged 60–61); Kinondoni, Dar-es-Salaam
- Cause of death: Execution style murder / Assassination
- Education: University of Dar-es-Salaam
- Occupation: Lecturer • Politician • Political Strategist
- Organization: Lecturer University of Dar-es-Salaam
- Known for: Constitutional Law
- Political party: NCCR-Mageuzi (until 2013)

Sengondo Mvungi (1952 – 12 November 2013) was a Tanzanian NCCR-Mageuzi politician and academic.

Running as the NCCR-Mageuzi presidential candidate in the December 2005 election with the support of four other political parties, Mvungi placed fifth out of ten candidates, receiving 55819 votes (0.43%).

He died in hospital in 2013 from injuries sustained when his home in Mbezi, Dar-es-Salaam was attacked by unidentified burglars nine days before his death. His death is subjected to be politically motivated due to his decisive challenge to the sitting regime government. As of 2021, there was not much investigation to the cause of the death or capturing his victims.
