= 2010 Tanzanian general election =

- 31 October 2010
- Presidential election
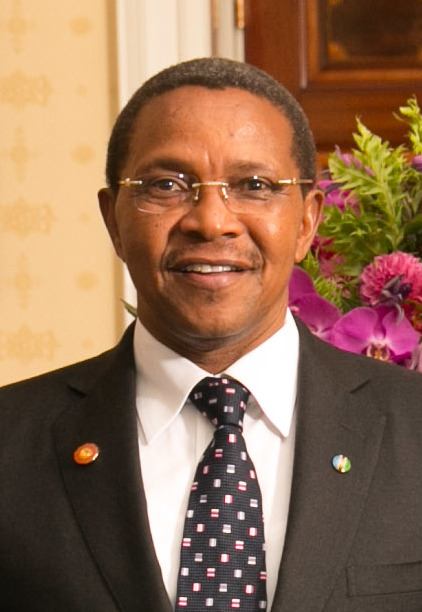

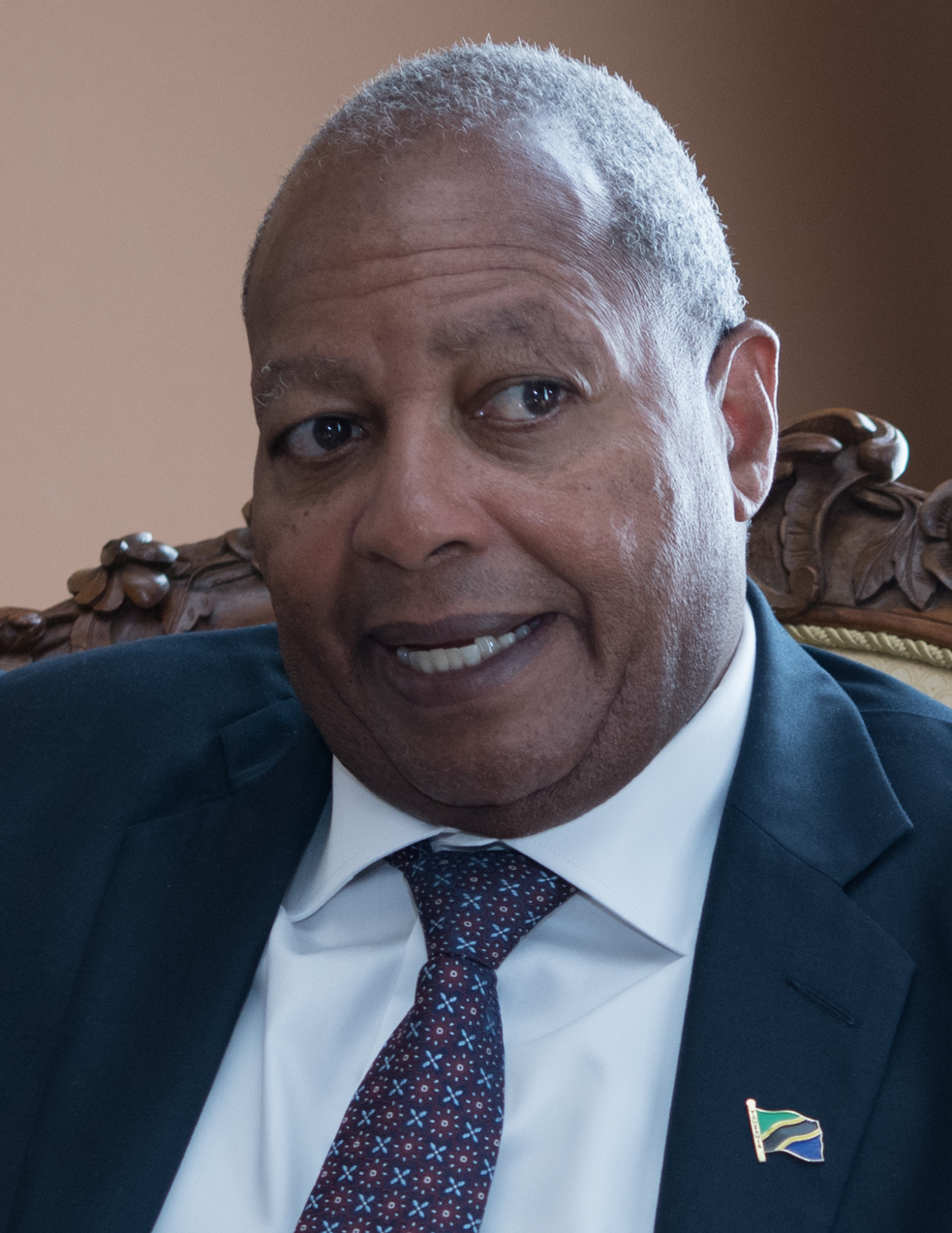
Nominee	Jakaya Kikwete	Willibrod Slaa
Party	CCM	Chadema
Popular vote	5,276,827	2,271,491
Percentage	62.83%	27.05%
President before election
Jakaya Kikwete
CCM
Elected President
Jakaya Kikwete
CCM

General elections were held in Tanzania on 31 October 2010. The presidential elections were won by the incumbent Jakaya Kikwete of the Chama Cha Mapinduzi party (CCM), who received 63% of the vote, down from 80% in 2005. The parliamentary elections resulted in a victory for the CCM, which won 186 of the 239 elected seats in the National Assembly.

In the elections in semi-autonomous Zanzibar, Ali Mohamed Shein of the CCM won the presidential election, whilst the CCM also won the most seats in the House of Representatives.

== Electoral system ==
For the 2010 elections, the National Assembly had 317 members, of which 239 (up from 232) were elected by plurality voting in single-member constituencies, 102 were reserved for women, five elected by the House of Representatives of Zanzibar and up to seven appointed by the president. The Attorney General is also a member of the Assembly.

The Zanzibar House of Representatives had 50 elected members, ten appointed by the President, and 15 seats for women. The women's seats were assigned to parties which won seats in the House, and distributed in proportion to the number of seats held by each party. The House also had six ex officio members, the Attorney General and five Regional Commissioners.

== Results ==
=== President ===
Candidate	Party	Votes	%
Jakaya Mrisho Kikwete	Chama Cha Mapinduzi	5,276,827	62.83
Willibrod Slaa	Chadema	2,271,491	27.05
Ibrahim Haruna Lipumba	Civic United Front	695,667	8.28
Peter Mziray Kuga	Progressive Party of Tanzania – Maendeleo	96,932	1.15
Hashim Spunda Rungwe	NCCR–Mageuzi	26,388	0.31
Muttamwega Bhatt Mgaywan	Tanzania Labour Party	17,482	0.21
Yahmi Nassoro Dovutwa	United People's Democratic Party	13,176	0.16
Total		8,397,963	100.00
Valid votes		8,397,963	97.36
Invalid/blank votes		227,889	2.64
Total votes		8,625,852	100.00
Registered voters/turnout		20,137,303	42.84
Source: African Elections Database

=== National Assembly ===
Party	Votes	%	Seats			
Party	Votes	%	Constituency	Women	Total	+/–
Chama Cha Mapinduzi	4,641,830	60.20	186	67	253	–11
Chadema	1,839,569	23.86	23	25	48	+37
Civic United Front	818,122	10.61	24	10	34	+4
NCCR–Mageuzi	193,738	2.51	4	0	4	+4
United Democratic Party	113,148	1.47	1	0	1	0
Tanzania Labour Party	51,003	0.66	1	0	1	0
National League for Democracy	14,511	0.19	0	0	0	0
Democratic Party	6,412	0.08	0	0	0	0
Progressive Party of Tanzania – Maendeleo	5,727	0.07	0	0	0	0
United People's Democratic Party	4,781	0.06	0	0	0	0
Association of Farmers Party	4,442	0.06	0	0	0	New
Jahazi Asilia	3,972	0.05	0	0	0	0
Sauti ya Umma	3,712	0.05	0	0	0	0
Chama cha Haki na Ustawi	2,483	0.03	0	0	0	0
Demokrasia Makini	2,376	0.03	0	0	0	0
Tanzania Democratic Alliance	2,146	0.03	0	0	0	0
National Reconstruction Alliance	1,375	0.02	0	0	0	0
Union for Multiparty Democracy	1,102	0.01	0	0	0	0
Presidential appointees			–	–	10	0
Elected by Zanzibar House of Representatives			–	–	5	0
Attorney-General			–	–	1	0
Total	7,710,449	100.00	239	102	357	+34
Valid votes	7,710,449	96.43				
Invalid/blank votes	285,476	3.57				
Total votes	7,995,925	100.00				
Registered voters/turnout	20,137,303	39.71				
Source: National Electoral Commission, IPU

=== Zanzibar ===
==== President ====
Candidate	Party	Votes	%
Ali Mohamed Shein	Chama Cha Mapinduzi	179,809	50.11
Seif Sharif Hamad	Civic United Front	176,338	49.14
Kassim Bakari Ali	Jahazi Asilia	803	0.22
Haji Khamis Haji	National Reconstruction Alliance	525	0.15
Juma Ali Khatib	Tanzania Democratic Alliance	497	0.14
Said Soud Said	Association of Farmers Party	480	0.13
Ambar Haji Khamis	NCCR–Mageuzi	363	0.10
Total		358,815	100.00
Valid votes		358,815	98.33
Invalid/blank votes		6,109	1.67
Total votes		364,924	100.00
Registered voters/turnout		407,658	89.52
Source: African Elections Database

==== House of Representatives ====
Party	Votes	%	Seats		
Party	Votes	%	Constituency	Women	Total
Chama Cha Mapinduzi	178,091	50.25	28	11	39
Civic United Front	168,082	47.43	22	9	31
Jahazi Asilia	3,567	1.01	0	0	0
Chadema	2,175	0.61	0	0	0
NCCR–Mageuzi	1,046	0.30	0	0	0
Tanzania Democratic Alliance	651	0.18	0	0	0
Tanzania Labour Party	267	0.08	0	0	0
Sauti ya Umma	160	0.05	0	0	0
National Reconstruction Alliance	111	0.03	0	0	0
Association of Farmers Party	91	0.03	0	0	0
Demokrasia Makini	84	0.02	0	0	0
Democratic Party	61	0.02	0	0	0
Appointed			–	–	10
Speaker and Attorney General			–	–	2
Total	354,386	100.00	50	20	82
Registered voters/turnout	407,658	–			
Source: African Elections Database

== Aftermath ==
Kikwete's swearing-in ceremony took place on 6 November 2010 at the National Stadium in Dar es Salaam.

== See also ==
- Salum Khalfani Bar'wan, a member of the Civic United Front elected from the Lindi Urban constituency; the first person with albinism elected to the National Assembly of Tanzania.
