= 2005 Tanzanian general election =

← 2000	14 December 2005	2010 →
- Presidential election
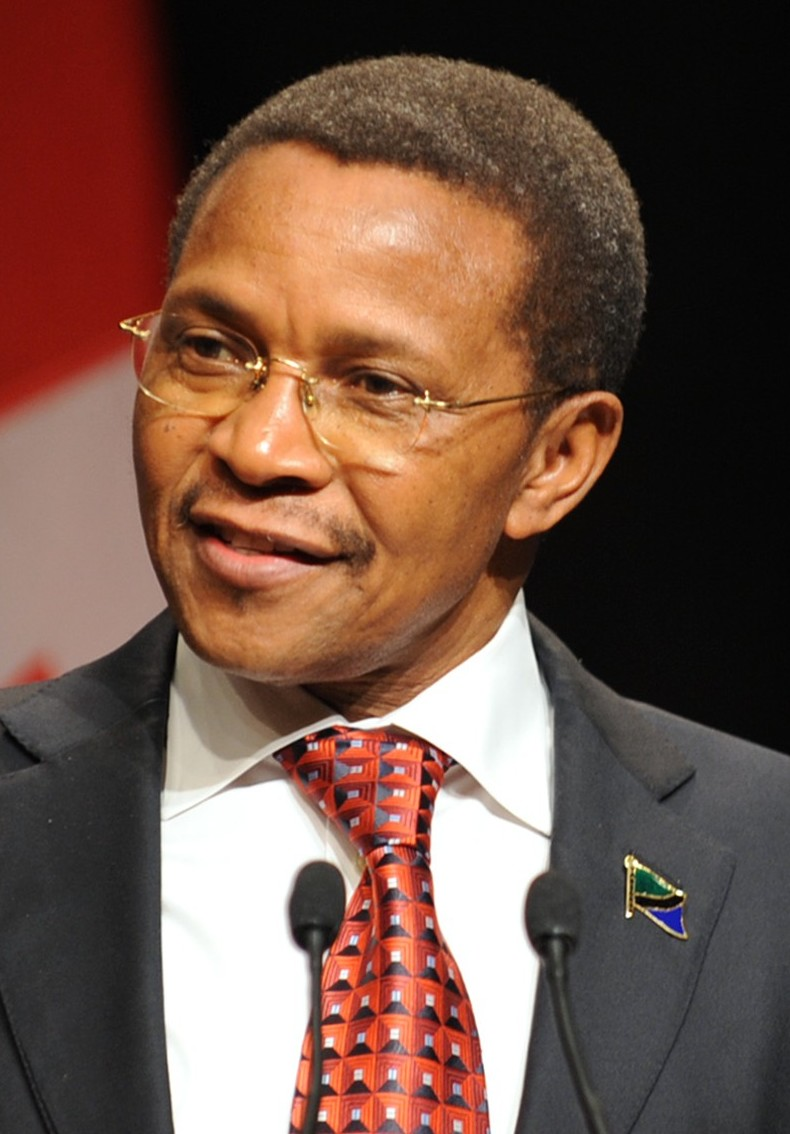

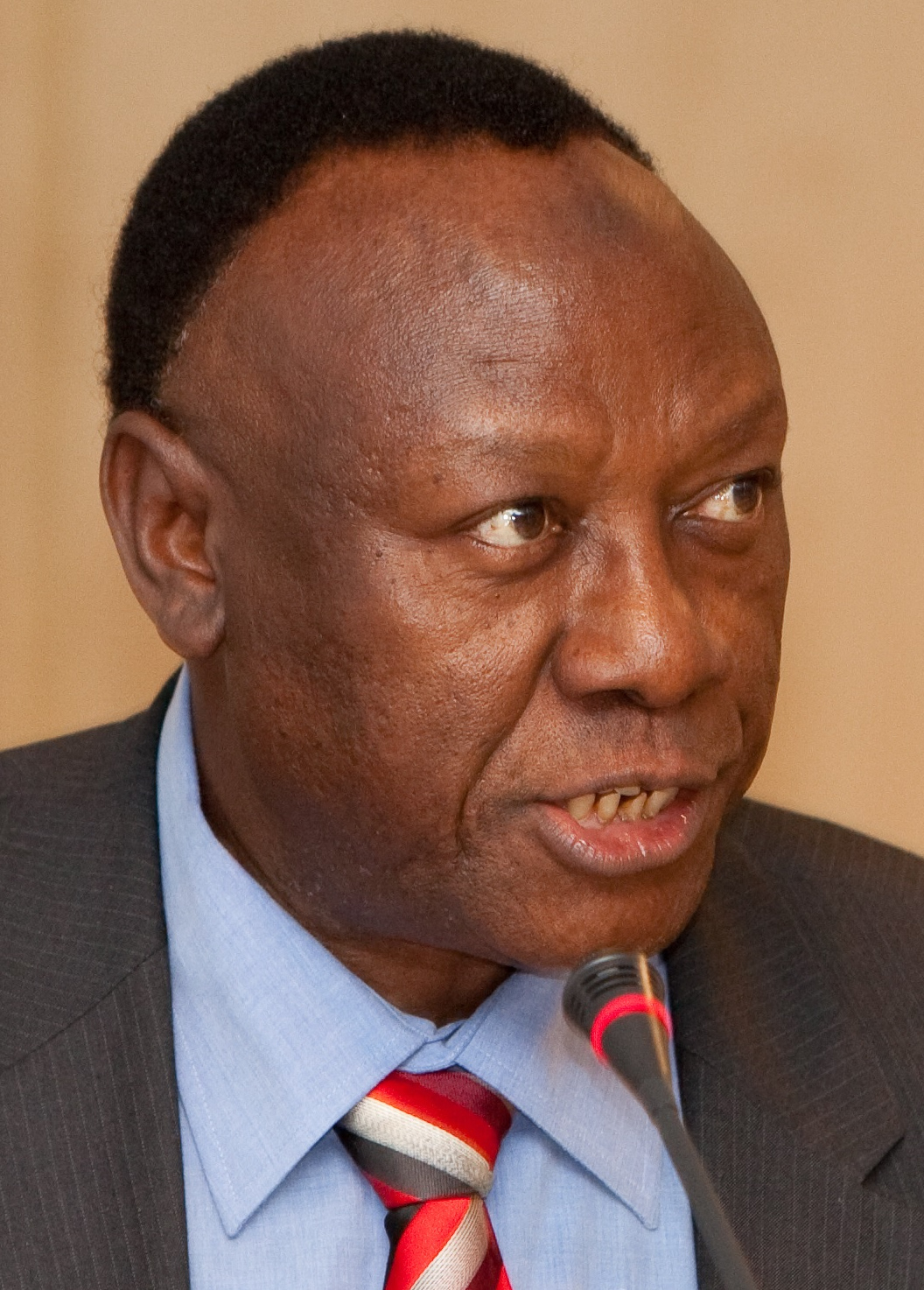
Nominee	Jakaya Kikwete	Ibrahim Lipumba
Party	CCM	Civic United Front
Popular vote	9,123,952	1,327,125
Percentage	80.28%	11.68%
President before election
Benjamin Mkapa
CCM
Elected President
Jakaya Kikwete
CCM

General elections were held in Tanzania on 14 December 2005. Originally scheduled for 30 October, the elections were postponed due to the death of CHADEMA vice-presidential candidate Jumbe Mohamed Jumbe. The elections were the third since the country returned to multi-party rule in 1992. Incumbent President Benjamin Mkapa stepped down after two consecutive terms in accordance with the constitution. Elections for the Presidency of Zanzibar and its House of Representatives took place on 30 October, as scheduled.

The presidential election was won by Jakaya Kikwete of Chama Cha Mapinduzi (CCM), who received 80% of the vote, with Ibrahim Lipumba of the Civic United Front finishing second with 12%. In the parliamentary elections, the CCM won 264 of the 323 seats in the National Assembly.

== Presidential candidates ==
=== Union ===
- Jakaya Kikwete – Chama Cha Mapinduzi (CCM)
- Paul Henry Kyara – Sauti ya Umma (SAU)
- Ibrahim Lipumba – Civic United Front (CUF)
- Emmanuel Makaidi – National League for Democracy (NLD)
- Freeman Mbowe – Chama cha Demokrasia na Maendeleo (CHADEMA)
- Augustine Mrema – Tanzania Labour Party (TLP)
- Christopher Mtikila – Democratic Party (DP)
- Sengondo Mvungi – National Convention for Construction and Reform-Mageuzi (NCCR-Mageuzi). He was also supported by the Forum for the Restoration of Democracy (FORD), National Reconstruction Alliance (NRA), Union for Multiparty Democracy (UMD), and United People's Democratic Party (UPDP).
- Anna Senkoro – Progressive Party of Tanzania-Maendeleo (PPT-Maendeleo)
- Leonard Shayo – Demokrasia Makini (MAKINI)

=== Zanzibar ===
- Amani Abeid Karume – Chama Cha Mapinduzi (CCM)
- Seif Shariff Hamad – Civic United Front (CUF)
- Haji Mussa Kitole – Jahazi Asilia
- Abdallah Ali Abdallah – Democratic Party (DP)
- Mariam Omar – Sauti ya Umma (SAU)
- Simai Abdulrahman Abdallah – National Reconstruction Alliance (NRA)

== Results ==
=== President ===
Candidate	Running mate	Party	Votes	%
Jakaya Mrisho Kikwete	Ali Mohamed Shein	Chama Cha Mapinduzi	9,123,952	80.28
Ibrahim Lipumba	Juma Duni Haji	Civic United Front	1,327,125	11.68
Freeman Mbowe	Anna Komu	Chadema	668,756	5.88
Augustine Mrema	Omari Rukia	Tanzania Labour Party	84,901	0.75
Sengondo Mvungi	Naila Majid Jiddawi	NCCR–Mageuzi	55,819	0.49
Mchungaji Augustine Mtikila	Soud Said Said	Democratic Party	31,083	0.27
Emmanuel Makaidi	Mohamed Ali Kassim	National League for Democracy	21,574	0.19
Anna Senkoro	Yusuph Mchenga	Progressive Party of Tanzania – Maendeleo	18,783	0.17
Leonard Shayo	Hussein Ali Suleiman	Demokrasia Makini	17,070	0.15
Paul Henry Kyara	Ramadhani Haji	Sauti ya Umma	16,414	0.14
Total			11,365,477	100.00
Valid votes			11,365,477	95.70
Invalid/blank votes			510,450	4.30
Total votes			11,875,927	100.00
Registered voters/turnout			16,401,694	72.41
Source: African Elections Database

=== Parliament ===
Party	Votes	%	Seats			
Party	Votes	%	Constituency	Women	Total	+/–
Chama Cha Mapinduzi	7,579,897	69.99	206	58	264	+21
Civic United Front	1,542,254	14.24	19	11	30	+9
Chadema	888,133	8.20	5	6	11	+6
Tanzania Labour Party	306,219	2.83	1	0	1	–4
NCCR–Mageuzi	239,452	2.21	0	0	0	–1
United Democratic Party	155,887	1.44	1	0	1	–3
Chama cha Haki na Ustawi	38,085	0.35	0	0	0	New
Jahazi Asilia	21,042	0.19	0	0	0	New
Progressive Party of Tanzania – Maendeleo	13,532	0.12	0	0	0	0
Democratic Party	11,876	0.11	0	0	0	New
Tanzania Democratic Alliance	6,845	0.06	0	0	0	0
Sauti ya Umma	6,085	0.06	0	0	0	New
National League for Democracy	6,054	0.06	0	0	0	0
United People's Democratic Party	5,456	0.05	0	0	0	0
National Reconstruction Alliance	3,459	0.03	0	0	0	0
Demokrasia Makini	2,102	0.02	0	0	0	New
Forum for Restoration of Democracy	1,625	0.02	0	0	0	New
Union for Multiparty Democracy	1,510	0.01	0	0	0	New
Presidential appointees			–	–	10	0
Elected by Zanzibar House of Representatives			–	–	5	0
Attorney-General			–	–	1	0
Total	10,829,513	100.00	232	75	323	+28
Valid votes	10,829,513	94.68				
Invalid/blank votes	608,837	5.32				
Total votes	11,438,350	100.00				
Registered voters/turnout	16,425,913	69.64				
Source: EISA

=== Zanzibar President ===
Candidate	Party	Votes	%
Amani Abeid Karume	Chama Cha Mapinduzi	239,832	53.18
Seif Shariff Hamad	Civic United Front	207,733	46.06
Haji Mussa Kitole	Jahazi Asilia	2,110	0.47
Abdallah Ali Abdallah	Democratic Party	509	0.11
Simai Abdulrahman Abdallah	National Reconstruction Alliance	449	0.10
Mariam Omar	Sauti ya Umma	335	0.07
Total		450,968	100.00
Valid votes		450,968	97.91
Invalid/blank votes		9,613	2.09
Total votes		460,581	100.00
Registered voters/turnout		507,225	90.80
Source: EISA

=== Zanzibar House of Representatives ===
Party	Votes	%	Seats
Chama Cha Mapinduzi	228,159	52.02	30
Civic United Front	197,810	45.10	19
Others	12,653	2.88	0
Total	438,622	100.00	49
Valid votes	438,622	98.59	
Invalid/blank votes	6,251	1.41	
Total votes	444,873	100.00	
Registered voters/turnout	506,985	87.75	
Source: EISA

Note: A re-run of the invalidated election took place on 14 December 2005.

== See also ==
- List of Tanzania National Assembly members 2005–2010
