= National League for Democracy (Tanzania) =

Political party in Tanzania

The National League for Democracy (NLD) is a political party in Tanzania. The party was registered on 21 March 1993.

In elections held on 14 December 2005, NLD presidential candidate Emmanuel Makaidi placed seventh out of ten candidates, winning 0.19% of the vote. The party failed to win any seats in National Assembly elections held on the same day.

== Election results ==
=== Presidential elections ===
Election	Party candidate	Votes	%	Result
2005	Emmanuel Makaidi	21,574	0.19%	Lost ✗
2010	Did not participate			
2015	Did not participate			
2020	Did not participate			
2025	Doyo Hassan Doyo	18,037	0.06%	Lost ✗
