= Independent National Electoral Commission (Tanzania) =

Tanzanian national electoral body

- Tume ya Taifa ya Uchaguzi (Swahili)

Commission overview
- Formed: December 9, 1961; 64 years ago
- Type: Autonomous government institution
- Jurisdiction: Tanzania
- Status: Independent regulatory agency
- Headquarters: Jengo la Uchaguzi, Dodoma, Tanzania
- Commission executives: Jacobs Mwambegele, Chairman; Mbarouk Salim Mbarouk, Vice chairperson
- Key document: Constitution of Tanzania, Article 74(1)
- Website: www.inec.go.tz

The Independent National Electoral Commission (INEC), formally known as National Electoral Commission (NEC), is the national election commission of Tanzania.

== Responsibilities ==
Article 74(6) of the constitution states its responsibilities:

- Register voters for the union presidential and parliamentary elections.
- Supervise the conduct of the presidential and parliamentary elections
- Review and demarcate the electoral boundaries
- Perform any other function as per the law such as organize referendums.

== See also ==
- Elections in Tanzania
