= Progressive Party of Tanzania – Maendeleo =

Political party in Tanzania

The Progressive Party of Tanzania–Maendeleo (PPT–Maendeleo) is a political party in Tanzania. The party was registered on 4 March 2003.

In elections held on 18 December 2005, PPT–Maendeleo presidential candidate Anna Senkoro placed eighth out of ten candidates, winning 0.17% of the vote. She was the only woman to run in the election, and the first woman in Tanzanian history to run for president. The party failed to win any seats in National Assembly elections held on the same day.

In the same election, PPT-Maendeleo won a seat in the local government election in Same District, Kilimanjaro Region. Due to this, the Electoral Commission appointed one special seat of a woman councillor. Hence now PPT-Maendeleo is among 7 active political parties out of 17. It also has more than 50 seats in the village councils.

The current National Leader (President) is Peter Kuga Mziray while the Vice President is Khamis Suleiman. The Party's head office is located at Wibu street, Kinondoni, Dar es Salaam.
