= Chama cha Haki na Ustawi =

Political party in Tanzania

Chama cha Haki na Usitawi (CHAUSTA) is a political party in Tanzania. The party was registered on 15 November 2001. Its founder and current chairman is James Mapalala, a former national chairman of the Civic United Front.
