= Chama Cha Kijamii =

Political party in Tanzania

Social Party Chama Cha Kijamii (Swahili)
- Abbreviation: CCK
- Chairman: David Mwaijojele
- Secretary-General: Joachim Mwakitiga
- Founded: 2012
- Split from: Chama Cha Mapinduzi
- Preceded by: Chama Cha Jamii (CCJ)
- Headquarters: Tanzania
- Colours

Party flag

Chama Cha Kijamii (CCK) is a political party in Tanzania.

== Election results ==
=== Presidential elections ===
Election	Party candidate	Votes	%	Result
2025	Mwaijojele David Daud	12,516	0.04%	Lost ✗
