= Union for Multiparty Democracy =

Political party in Tanzania

The Union for Multiparty Democracy (UMD) is a political party in Tanzania. The party was registered on 21 January 1993.

The party didn't field a presidential candidate in the 14 December 2005 election, but supported Sengondo Mvungi of the National Convention for Construction and Reform-Mageuzi. He placed fifth out of ten candidates, winning 0.49% of the vote.

== Election results ==
=== Presidential elections ===
Election	Party candidate	Votes	%	Result
2020	Khalfan Mohammed Mazrui	3,721	0.03%	Lost ✗
2025	Mwajuma Noty Mirambo	13,814	0.04%	Lost ✗
