= Civic United Front =

Political party in Tanzania

Civic United Front Chama Cha Wananchi
- Abbreviation: CUF
- Chairman: Ibrahim Haruna Lipumba
- Founded: 28 May 1992
- Registered: 21 January 1993
- Merger of: Civic Movement; Zanzibar United Front
- Split from: Chama Cha Mapinduzi
- Headquarters: Zanzibar
- Ideology: Zanzibari autonomism Liberalism
- Political position: Centre
- Regional affiliation: ALN
- International affiliation: LI
- Colours
- Slogan: Equal rights for all (Haki sawa kwa wote)
- Bunge: 0 / 393
- Zanzibar HoR: 0 / 85
- EALA: 0 / 9
- SADC PF: 0 / 5
- Pan-African Parliament: 0 / 5

Election symbol
- A pair of shaking hands underneath the Scales of Justice

Party flag

Website
- www.cuf.or.tz

The Civic United Front (CUF; Swahili: Chama Cha Wananchi, lit. 'Party of Citizens') is a liberal party in Tanzania. Although nationally based, most of the CUF's support comes from the Zanzibar islands of Unguja and Pemba. The party is a member of Liberal International.

== History ==
The Civic United Front was formed on 28 May 1992 through a merger of two formerly existing movements: KAMAHURU, a pressure group for democratization in Zanzibar, and the Civic Movement, a human rights organization based on the mainland.

Many CUF leaders were former stalwarts of the ruling Chama Cha Mapinduzi (CCM), some of whom had been expelled over disputes about party and government policy. The party received full recognition on 21 January 1993.

== Leadership ==
- Ibrahim Lipumba, National Chairman
- Abass Juma Muhunzi, Vice Chairman
- Magdalena Sakaya, Deputy Secretary General (Tanzania mainland)

== Electoral performance ==
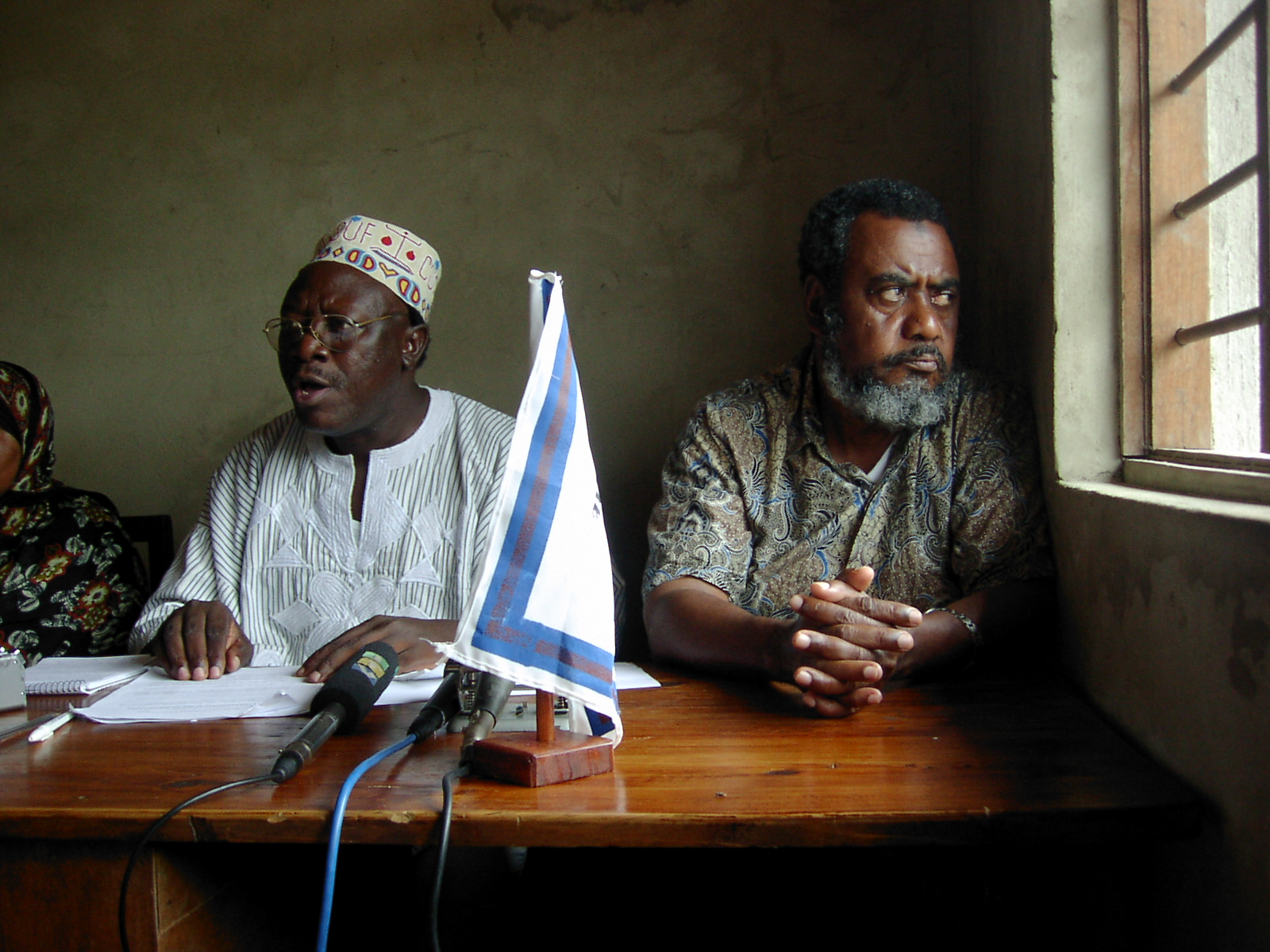
Lipumba (left) and Hamad (right) at a press conference in Pemba after their victory in a by-election

The Civic United Front participated in the 1995, 2000, 2005, 2010 and 2015 elections.

In the 1995 presidential election, CUF candidate Ibrahim Lipumba placed third (behind Benjamin Mkapa of the CCM and NCCR-Mageuzi candidate Augustine Mrema) winning 6.43% of the vote. In the National Assembly, the party won 24 of 232 elective seats, making it the largest opposition party in the legislature. Seif Shariff Hamad won 49.76% of the vote against 50.24% for the ruling party's Salmin Amour in elections for the presidency of Zanzibar. The CUF also obtained 24 of 50 elective seats in the Zanzibar House of Representatives. International and domestic observers heavily criticized the conduct of the Zanzibar polls.

Following the election, the CUF boycotted the House of Representatives and refused to recognize the Zanzibari government as legitimate. In November 1997, eighteen leaders of the CUF were arrested and subsequently charged with treason. These charges were later dropped.

In the 29 October 2000 presidential election, Lipumba placed second to Mkapa, winning 16.26% of the vote. The party maintained its status as the largest opposition party in the National Assembly by winning 17 of 231 elective seats. Seif Shariff Hamad won 32.96% of the vote against 67.04% for the ruling party's Amani Abeid Karume in elections for the presidency of Zanzibar. The CUF won 16 of 50 elective seats in the Zanzibar House of Representatives. The elections were considered largely free and fair on the mainland, but observers noted serious irregularities in the Zanzibar polls, with some calling for a complete re-run of the polls. When the electoral commission nullified the results in only 16 constituencies, the CUF announced that it would boycott the new elections conducted on 5 November 2000.

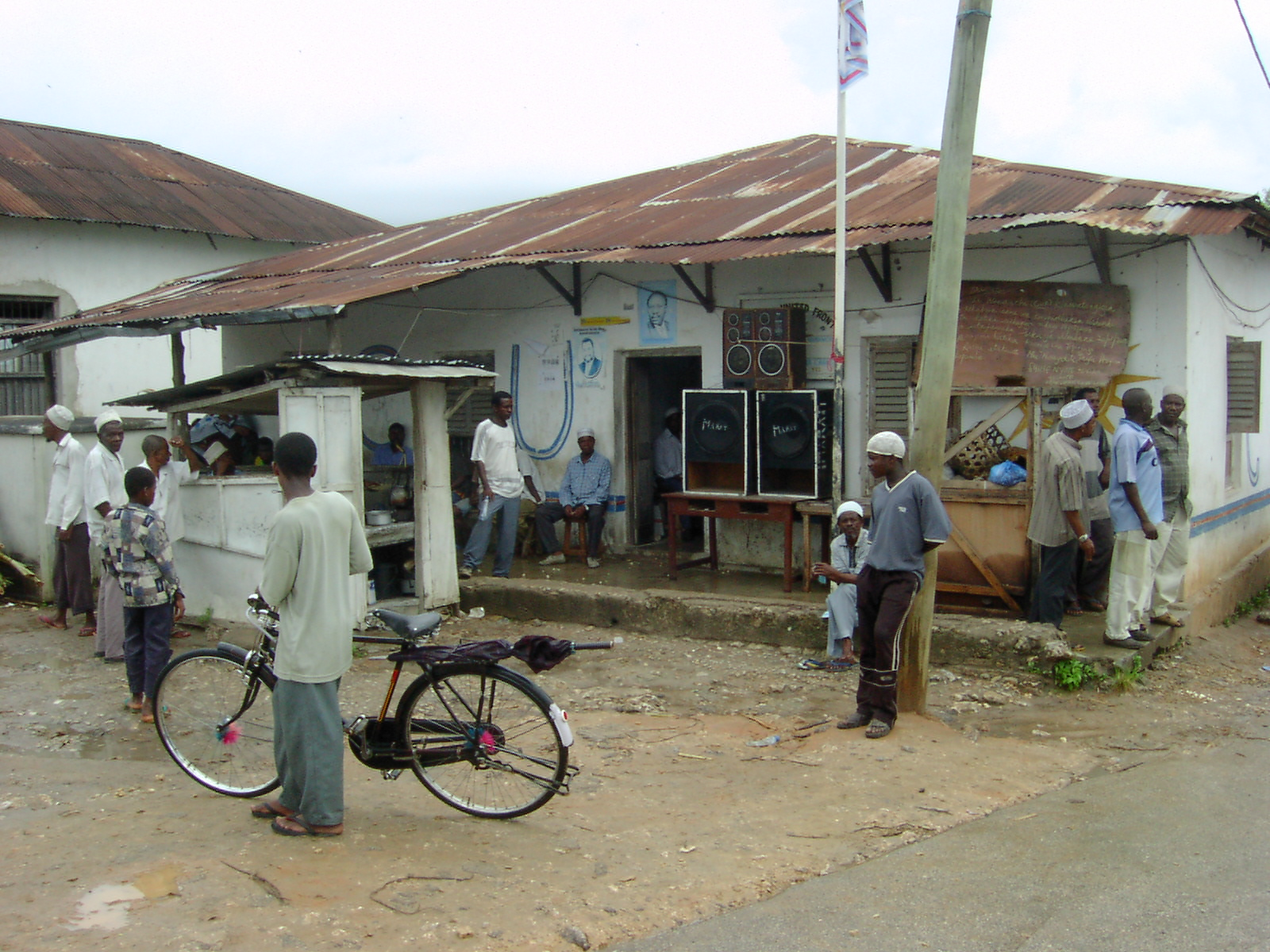
A CUF party office in Chake Chake, Pemba

Elections for the Zanzibar Presidency and House of Representatives took place on 30 October 2005. Seif Shariff Hamad placed second to incumbent Amani Abeid Karume, winning 46.07% of the vote. The party won 19 seats in the House of Representatives.

National elections were held on 14 December 2005. Ibrahim Lipumba placed a distant second to CCM candidate Jakaya Kikwete, winning 11.68% of the vote. Out of the 232 National Assembly seats filled through direct election, the CUF won 19.

== Electoral history ==
=== Presidential elections ===
Election	Party candidate	Votes	%	Result
1995	Ibrahim Lipumba	418,973	6.43%	Lost ✗
2000	Ibrahim Lipumba	1,329,077	16.26%	Lost ✗
2005	Ibrahim Lipumba	1,327,125	11.68%	Lost ✗
2010	Ibrahim Lipumba	695,667	8.28%	Lost ✗
2015	Did not participate			
2020	Ibrahim Lipumba	72,885	0.49%	Lost ✗
2025	Gombo Samandito Gombo	164,050	0.50%	Lost ✗

=== Bunge elections ===
Election	Party leader	Votes	%	Seats	+/–	Position	Government
1995	Ibrahim Lipumba	323,432	5.02%	28 / 285	▲28	▲3rd	Opposition
2000	Ibrahim Lipumba	890,044	12.54%	21 / 285	▼9	▲2nd	Opposition
2005	Ibrahim Lipumba	1,551,243	14.3%	30 / 323	▲9	2nd	Opposition
2010	Ibrahim Lipumba	818,122	10.61%	34 / 357	▲4	▼3rd	Opposition
2015	Ibrahim Lipumba	1,257,765	8.63%	42 / 393	▲8	3rd	Opposition
2020	Ibrahim Lipumba			2 / 393	▼40	▼4th	Opposition
