= Chadema =

Political party in Tanzania

Party for Democracy and Progress Chama cha Demokrasia na Maendeleo
- Abbreviation: CHADEMA
- Chairman: Tundu Lissu
- Secretary-General: John Mnyika
- Spokesperson: Brenda Rupia
- Vice chairman: John Heche
- Founded: 28 May 1992
- Youth wing: BAVICHA
- Women's wing: BAWACHA
- Ideology: Conservatism; Economic liberalism Social market economy Federalism
- Political position: Centre-right
- Regional affiliation: Democrat Union of Africa
- European affiliation: European Conservatives and Reformists Party (regional partner, until 2022)
- International affiliation: International Democracy Union
- Slogan: People's Power

Party flag

Website
- Party website

The Party for Democracy and Progress (Swahili: Chama cha Demokrasia na Maendeleo), commonly known as Chadema, is a centre-right political party in Tanzania. It was the second-largest political party in Tanzania and campaigns on regional autonomy of self-governing states in the country.

== History ==
In the 1995 general election, the party won 4 out of 269 seats in the National Assembly and 41 councillors nationwide.

In the 2000 election, the party did not have the presidential candidate but it won five seats in National Assembly elections held on the same day, along with 75 Councillors and three district councils: Kigoma, Karatu, and Tarime.

In the 2005 elections Chadema's presidential candidate, Freeman Mbowe, finished third out of ten candidates, with 5.88% of the vote. Chadema further increased its share in the national assembly as it continued becoming more and more popular, especially among younger people, and the party managed to install eleven members of parliament, in addition to 103 Councillors and the Chadema party retained the district councils of Kigoma, Tarime, and Karatu.

In the 2010 general elections, Chadema substantially increased its share of the national vote. Dr. Willibrod Slaa, Secretary-General of the party until August 2015, gained 27.1% of the vote in the presidential election, a substantial increase from the 5.88% of the vote gained by the Chadema candidate in the 2005 election. The party also won 48 seats, making it the second-largest party in the National Assembly. This was a first for the party. A further 467 Councillors and 7 District Councils were claimed by Chadema. Most of the seats won by Chadema (geographically) are constituencies found in major towns and urban areas of Tanzania, including Arusha, Moshi, Mwanza, Mbeya, and Dar es Salaam, the latter of which is Tanzania's financial capital and its largest city.

In the general election of October 2015, Chadema joined with other political parties: CUF (Civil United Front), NLD (National League for Democracy), and NCCR-Mageuzi to form Umoja wa Katiba ya Wananchi (UKAWA) and the union was represented by one presidential candidate, Edward Lowassa.

Chadema designated the MP for Singida East, Tundu Lissu, as its presidential candidate for the 2020 Tanzanian general election. The election was held amid significant democratic backsliding and repression under president John Magufuli. Lissu received 1,933,271 votes, and Chadema lost 53 seats in the National Assembly, its worst loss ever since the party was founded in 1992.

In September 2024 chairman Freeman Mbowe and his deputy Tundu Lissu were arrested by the Tanzania police, in an effort to block protests against the government.

On 22 January 2025, Tundu Lissu was elected the chairman of Chadema, defeating Freeman Mbowe by 31 votes.

In April 2025, the party was disqualified from competing in the 2025 Tanzanian general election after the National Electoral Commission said it had failed to sign a code of conduct document that was due on 12 April, which occurred days after Tundu Lissu was arrested and charged with treason following a rally in which he called for electoral reform.

== Electoral history ==
=== Presidential elections ===
Election	Party candidate	Votes	%	Result
2005	Freeman Mbowe	668,756	5.88%	Lost ✗
2010	Willbroad Slaa	2,271,491	27.05%	Lost ✗
2015	Edward Lowassa	6,072,848	39.97%	Lost ✗
2020	Tundu Lissu	1,933,271	13.04%	Lost ✗
2025	None	—N/a	—N/a	Lost ✗

=== Bunge elections ===
Election	Votes	%	Seats	+/−	Position	Result
1995	396,825	6.16%	4 / 285	▲4	3rd	Opposition
2000	300,567	4.23%	5 / 285	▲1	▼5th	Opposition
2005	888,133	8.2%	11 / 323	▲6	▲3rd	Opposition
2010	1,839,568	23.86%	48 / 357	▲37	▲2nd	Opposition
2015	4,627,923	31.75%	73 / 393	▲23	2nd	Opposition
2020	1,933,271	13.04%	20 / 393	▼53	2nd	Opposition
2025	Disqualified		0 / 403	▼20	—N/a	Extra-parliamentary
