= NCCR–Mageuzi =

Political party in Tanzania

NCCR–Mageuzi Chama cha Mageuzi na Ujenzi wa Taifa (Swahili)
- Abbreviation: NCCR–M
- Founder: Emmanuel ole Sirikiwa; Mabere Marando
- Founded: 1992
- Preceded by: National Committee for Constitutional Reforms
- Headquarters: Dar es Salaam
- Ideology: Social democracy
- Political position: Centre
- Colours
- Bunge: 0 / 393
- Zanzibar HoR: 0 / 85
- EALA: 1 / 9
- SADC PF: 0 / 5
- Pan-African Parliament: 0 / 5

Website
- Political Party Website

The National Convention for Construction and Reform – Mageuzi, popularly known by its acronym NCCR–Mageuzi, is an opposition political party in Tanzania.

== History ==
The party was registered on 21 March 1993.

== Electoral history ==
=== Presidential elections ===
Election	Party candidate	Votes	%	Result
1995	Augustino Mrema	1,808,616	27.7%	Lost ✗
2000	Augustino Mrema	637,115	7.80%	Lost ✗
2005	Sengondo Mvungi	55,819	0.49%	Lost ✗
2010	Hashim Spunda Rungwe	26,388	0.31%	Lost ✗
2015	Did not participate			
2020	Yeremia Kulwa Maganja	19,969	0.13%	Lost ✗
2025	Ambar Khamis Haji	25,190	0.08%	Lost ✗

=== Bunge elections ===
Election	Votes	%	Seats	+/−	Position	Result
1995	1,406,343	21.83%	19 / 285	▲19	▲2nd	Opposition
2000	256,591	3.61%	1 / 285	▼18	▼6th	Opposition
2005	239,452	2.21%	0 / 323	▼1	▲5th	Extra-parliamentary
2010	193,738	2.51%	4 / 357	▲4	▲4th	Opposition
2015	218,209	1.50%	1 / 393	▼3	▼5th	Opposition
2020	45,574	0.39%	0 / 393	▼1	5th	Extra-parliamentary
