= 2020 Chama Cha Mapinduzi presidential primaries =

2020 Tanzanian political party presidential primaries

CCM Zanzibar presidential primaries, 2020
← 2015	July 2020	2025 →
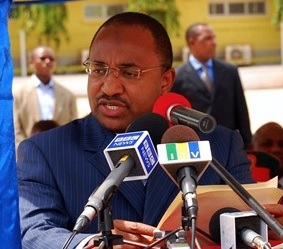

Candidate	Hussein Mwinyi	Khalid Salum Mohamed	Shamsi Vuai Nahodha
Party	CCM	CCM	CCM
Popular vote	129	19	16
Percentage	78.66%	11.58%	9.75%
Presidential Nominee before election
Ali Mohamed Shein
CCM
Elected Presidential Nominee
Hussein Mwinyi
CCM

The 2020 Chama Cha Mapinduzi presidential primaries occurred in July 2020. Incumbent president and 2015 nominee, John Magufuli, ran unopposed for his second term for the President of Tanzania and so there was no primary vote for the Union presidency position. However, Zanzibar president Ali Mohamed Shein is ineligible for re-election due to term limits and a primary was held to determine the Zanzibar presidential nominee. The winners of the primary are the CCM candidates for the 2020 Tanzanian general election and the 2020 Zanzibari general election.

== Background ==
Presidential aspirants must submit their intent to run to the party by June 30, 2020. Each aspirant has to be able to collect 250 sponsors from 12 regions (including 2 from Zanzibar). The party secretariat convened in Dodoma in July to make their decisions. The candidates were vetted by the party congress and names of a select few will be submitted to the National Executive Committee of the party to select the candidate.

== Union Presidential Candidates ==
Incumbent president Dr John Magufuli and party chairman ran unopposed to get the party ticket for re-election. Former foreign minister of Tanzania Bernard Membe intended to collect party nomination forms to contest against the incumbent president, however, the CCM central committee expelled Membe from the party. Following the decision, he returned his party card to leave the party.

== Zanzibar Presidential Candidates ==
The following candidates have been listed according to the dates that they expressed interest or formally announced their candidacy.

Candidate	Background	Notes
Ali Karume	Born 1950 (age 70), Hometown: Unguja, Zanzibar; Alma mater: Columbia University; Tanzanian Diplomat and Ambassador	Son of 1st President of Zanzibar, Abeid Karume; Brother of 6th President of Zanzibar, Amani Abeid Karume
Hussein Mwinyi	Born 1966 (age 53), Hometown: Unguja, Zanzibar; Alma mater: Marmara University (MD), Hammersmith Hospital (PhD); Member of Parliament for Kwahani; Minister of Defence and National Service in Magufuli cabinet	Son of 2nd President of Tanzania, Ali Hassan Mwinyi; Decaled candidacy on June 18, 2020
Maj Gen. Issa Suleimani Nassor	Retired Major General in Tanzania People's Defence Force; Ex-Tanzanian Ambassador to Egypt (2017-2019)	Decaled candidacy on June 18, 2020
Bakari Juma		Decaled candidacy on June 18, 2020
Hijja Mohamed		Decaled candidacy on June 18, 2020
Yahya Mwinyi		Decaled candidacy on June 18, 2020
Shamsi Nahodha	Born 1962 (age 57), Hometown: Unguja, Zanzibar; Alma mater:UDSM (BA), OUT (LL.B); Former Chief Minister of Zanzibar; Former Union Minister	Decaled candidacy on June 18, 2020
Omar Sheha Mussa	Former Member of Parliament Chumbuni	Declared candidacy on June 19, 2020
Mahmoud Thabit Kombo	Minister of Information and Tourism in Zanzibar	Son of Zanzibar revolutionary Thabit Kombo
Abdulkharim Mohammed Ali		Declared candidacy on June 19, 2020
Haji Rashid Pandu		Declared candidacy on June 19, 2020
Makame Mbarawa	Born 1961 (age 59), Hometown: Pemba, Zanzibar; Alma mater: Astrakhan State TU (MSc), University of NSW (PhD); Member of Parliament; Minister of Water and Irrigation in Magufuli cabinet	Declared candidacy on June 19, 2020
Mwantumu Mussa Sultan		First female presidential aspirant; Declared candidacy on June 19, 2020
Jecha Salum Jecha	Former chairman Zanzibar Election Commission	Declared candidacy on June 20, 2020
Mustafa Aboud Jumbe	Held previous ministerial positions in the Zanzibar Government	Son of 2nd President of Zanzibar, Aboud Jumbe; Declared candidacy on June 26, 2020

=== Declined to Run ===
- Samia Suluhu, Vice-President of Tanzania, declined to run for the election ticket. citing that the move would be a demotion from her current title.

== Results ==
=== Union Presidency ===
Since John Magufuli ran unopposed, he was automatically nominated as the party's candidate as the nominee for the president of Tanzania.

=== Zanzibar Presidency ===
==== Central Committee ====
On July 9, 2020, the central committee picked 5 names from the list of over 31 presidential aspirants. Of the 5, three names were passed down to the National Executive Council for popular vote.

==== National Executive Council ====
On July 10, 2020, the National Executive Council of the party voted on the 3 names passed down by the Central Committee. A total of 164 NEC members took part in the voting, and Hussein Mwinyi won the party nomination by a landslide.

Candidates Qualified by CC	Qualified for NEC Vote	NEC Votes	%
Hussein Mwinyi	Yes	129	78.65
Khalid Salum Mohamed	Yes	19	11.58
Shamsi Vuai Nahodha	Yes	16	9.75
Makame Mbarawa			
Khamis Mussa Omar			
		164	100
Results: The Citizen
