= List of representatives elected in the 2016 Zanzibari general election =

13th Assembly of Zanzibar
←	11th	14th	→

Overview
- Legislative body: Zanzibar House of Representatives
- Jurisdiction: Zanzibar, Tanzania
- Meeting place: Unguja, Zanzibar
- Term: 2016 – present
- Website: www.zanzibarassembly.go.tz

National Assembly
- Members: 88
- Speaker: Zubeir Ali Maulid
- Deputy Speaker: Mgeni Hassan Juma
- Party control: Chama Cha Mapinduzi

The 13th House of Representatives of Zanzibar is the current legislature of Zanzibar following the 2016 general election of representatives of the Zanzibar House of Representatives.

== Graphical representation ==
The House of Representatives has a total of 88. This includes the 54 directly contested parliamentary constituencies.

Party key	Chama Cha Mapinduzi (CCM)
Party key	Alliance for Democratic Change (ADC)
Party key	Alliance for Tanzania Farmers Party (AFP)
Party key	Tanzania Democratic Alliance (TDA)
Party key	Attorney General

↓ 50%
84	1	1	1	1
Chama Cha Mapinduzi	ADC	AFP	TDA	AG

== List of MPs elected in the general election ==
=== Directly Elected ===
Representative	Party	Region	Constituency	Notes
Shehe Hamad Mattar	CCM	Pemba South	Mgogoni	
Mwanaasha Khamis Juma	CCM	Mjini Magharibi	Chukwani	
Ambassador Seif Ali Iddi	CCM	Unguja North	Mahonda	
Issa Haji Ussi (Gavu)	CCM	Unguja South	Chwaka	
Haji Omar Kheir	CCM	Unguja North	Tumbatu	
Haroun Ali Suleiman	CCM	Unguja South	Makunduchi	
Mahmoud Thabit Kombo	CCM	Mjini Magharibi	Kiembesamaki	
Khamis Juma Mwalim	CCM	Mjini Magharibi	Pangawe	
Mmanga Mjengo Mjawiri	CCM	Pemba South	Mkoani	
Harusi Said Suleiman	CCM	Pemba North	Wete	
Mohamed Ahmada Salum	CCM	Mjini Magharibi	Malindi	
Simai Mohamed Said	CCM	Unguja South	Tunguu	
Juma Makungu Juma	CCM	Unguja South	Kijini	
Shamata Shaame Khamis	CCM	Pemba North	Micheweni	
Mihayo Juma N'hunga	CCM	Mjini Magharibi	Mwera	
Hassan Khamis Hafidh	CCM	Mjini Magharibi	Welezo	
Dr. Makame Ali Ussi	CCM	Mjini Magharibi	Mtopepo	
Abdalla Ali Kombo	CCM	Mjini Magharibi	Mwanakwerekwe	
Ali Khamis Bakari	CCM	Pemba North	Tumbe	
Ali Salum Haji	CCM	Mjini Magharibi	Kwahani	
Ali Suleiman Ali (Shihata)	CCM	Mjini Magharibi	Kijitoupele	
Ame Haji Ali	CCM	Unguja North	Nungwi	
Asha Abdalla Mussa	CCM	Unguja North	Kiwengwa	
Bahati Khamis Kombo	CCM	Pemba South	Chambani	
Hamad Abdalla Rashid	CCM	Pemba South	Wawi	
Hamza Hassan Juma	CCM	Mjini Magharibi	Shaurimoyo	
Hussein Ibrahim Makungu (Bhaa)	CCM	Mjini Magharibi	Mtoni	
Jaku Hashim Ayoub	CCM	Unguja South	Paje	
Khadija Omar Kibano	CCM	Pemba North	Mtambwe	
Dr. Khalid Salum Mohamed	CCM	Unguja North	Donge	
Machano Othman Said	CCM	Mjini Magharibi	Mfenesini	
Makame Said Juma	CCM	Pemba North	Kojani	
Maryam Thani Juma	CCM	Pemba North	Gando	
Masoud Abrahman Masoud	CCM	Mjini Magharibi	Bububu	
Miraji Khamis Mussa	CCM	Pemba North	Chumbuni	
Moh'd Mgaza Jecha	CCM	Pemba South	Mtambile	
Mohammed Said Mohamed	CCM	Mjini Magharibi	Mpendae	
Mohamedraza Hassanali Mohamedali	CCM	Unguja South	Uzini	
Mtumwa Peya Yussuf	CCM	Unguja North	Bumbwini	
Mussa Ali Mussa	CCM		Ole	
Mussa Foum Mussa	CCM	Pemba South	Kiwani	
Dr. Mwinyihaji Makame Mwadini	CCM	Mjini Magharibi	Dimani	
Nadir Abdul-latif Yussuf Alwardy	CCM	Unguja North	Chaani	
Nassor Salim Ali	CCM	Mjini Magharibi	Kikwajuni	
Omar Seif Abeid	CCM	Pemba North	Konde	
Ramadhan Hamza Chande	CCM	Mjini Magharibi	Jang'ombe	
Rashid Ali Juma	CCM	Mjini Magharibi	Amani	
Rashid Makame Shamsi	CCM	Mjini Magharibi	Magomeni	
Said Omar Said	CCM	Pemba North	Wingwi	
Shaib Said Ali	CCM	Pemba South	Chonga	
Suleiman Makame Ali	CCM	Pemba South	Ziwani	
Suleiman Sarahan Said	CCM	Pemba South	Chake chake	
Ussi Yahya Haji	CCM	Unguja North	Mkwajuni	
Yussuf Hassan Iddi	CCM	Mjini Magharibi	Fuoni	

=== Special Seats ===
Representative	Party	Notes
Mgeni Hassan Juma	CCM	Deputy Speaker
Riziki Pembe Juma	CCM	
Salama Aboud Talib.	CCM	
Chum Kombo Khamis	CCM	
Lulu Msham Abdalla	CCM	
Shadya Mohammed Suleiman	CCM	
Amina Iddi Mabrouk	CCM	
Bihindi Hamad Khamis	CCM	
Hamida Abdalla Issa	CCM	
Hidaya Ali Makame	CCM	
Mtumwa Suleiman Makame	CCM	
Mwanaidi Kassim Mussa	CCM	
Mwantatu Mbaraka Khamis	CCM	
Panya Ali Abdalla	CCM	
Saada Ramadhan Mwendwa	CCM	
Salha Mohamed Mwinjuma	CCM	
Salma Mussa Bilali	CCM	
Tatu Mohamed Ussi	CCM	
Viwe Khamis Abdalla	CCM	
Wanu Hafidh Ameir	CCM	
Zaina Abdalla Salum	CCM	
Zulfa Mmaka Omar	CCM	

=== Presidential Appointees ===
Representative	Party	Notes
Zubeir Ali Maulid	CCM	Speaker of the House
Mohamed Aboud Mohamed	CCM	
Mohamed Ramia Abdiwawa	CCM	
Ambassador Amina Salim Ali	CCM	
Balozi Ali Abeid A. Karume	CCM	
Dr. Sira Ubwa Mwamboya	CCM	
Hamad Rashid Mohammed	ADC	
Moudline Castico.	CCM	
Juma Ali Khatib	TADEA	
Said Soud Said	AFP	
Said Hassan Said	-	Attorney General
Ahmada Yahya Abdulwakil	CCM	

== See also ==
- List of MPs elected in the 2015 Tanzania general election
