= 1995 Tanzanian general election =

| ← 1990 | 29 October 1995 | 2000 → |
- Presidential election
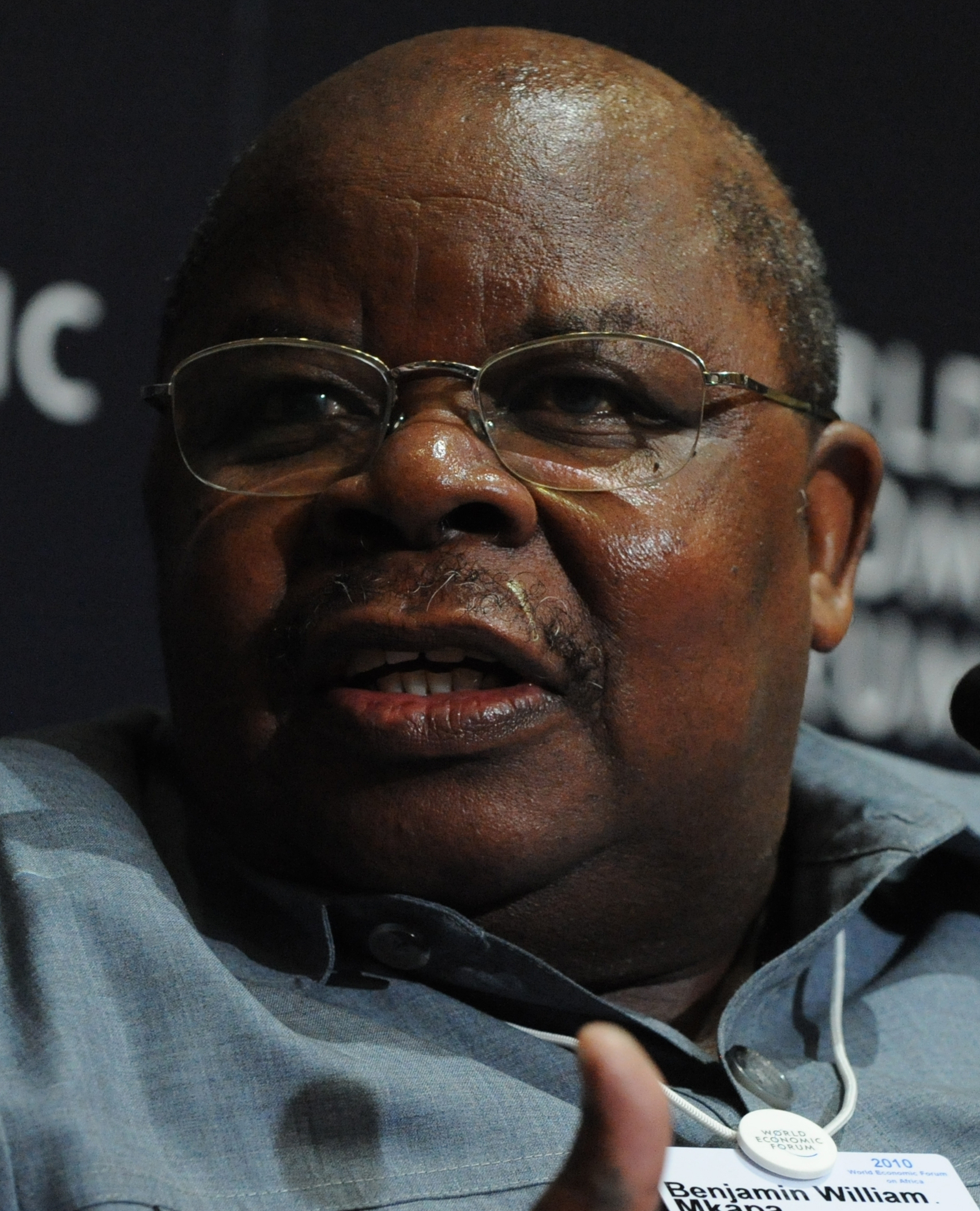

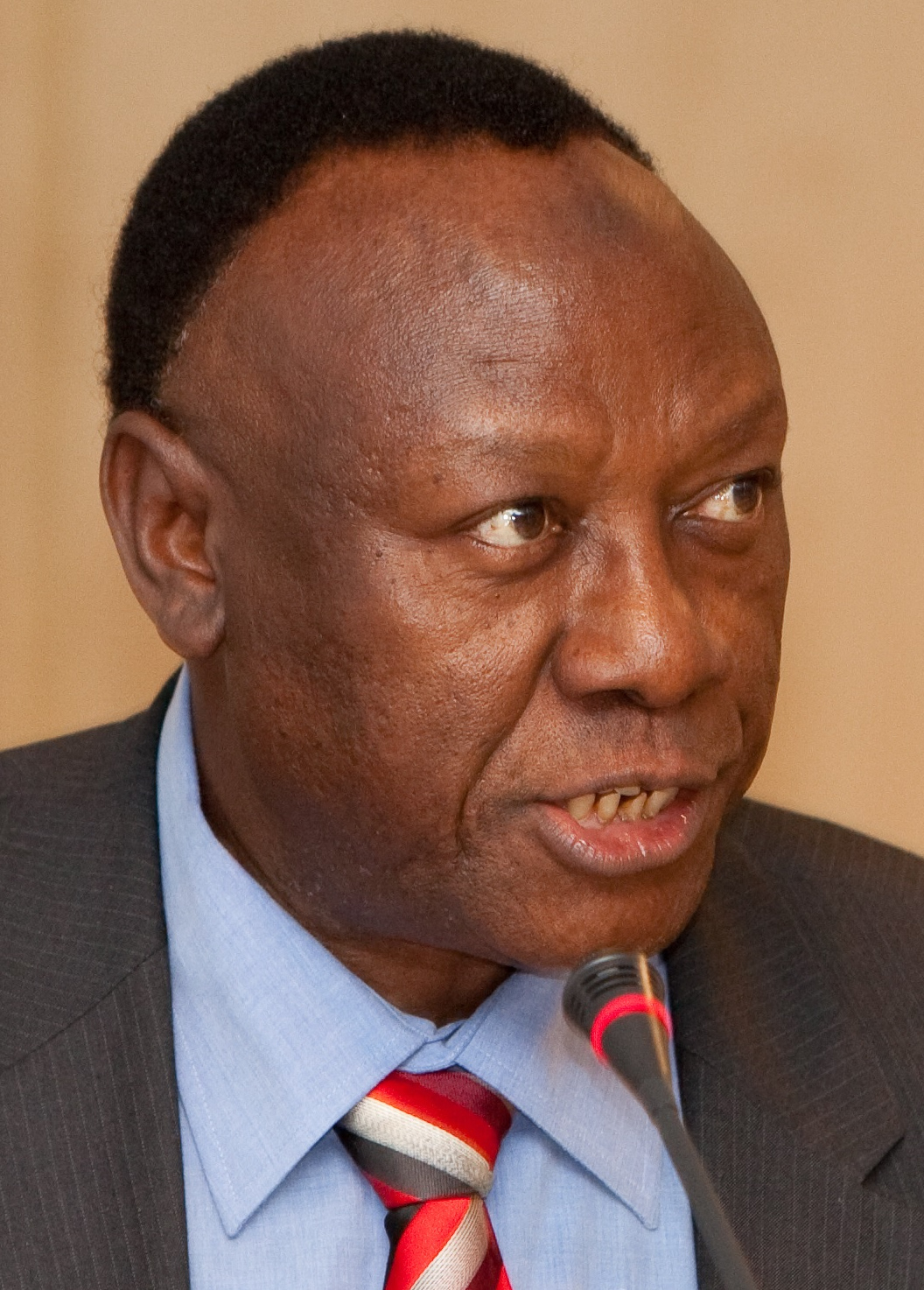
| Nominee | Benjamin Mkapa | Augustino Mrema | Ibrahim Lipumba |
| Party | CCM | NCCR–Mageuzi | CUF |
| Popular vote | 4,026,422 | 1,808,616 | 418,973 |
| Percentage | 61.82% | 27.77% | 6.43% |
- Results by region
President before election
Ali Hassan Mwinyi
CCM
Elected President
Benjamin Mkapa
CCM

General elections were held in Tanzania on 29 October. They were the first multi-party general elections after the lifting of the ban on political parties other than Chama Cha Mapinduzi (CCM) in 1992. However, the results were declared null and void by the National Electoral Commission due to failures to provide ballots to many polling places. As a result, the elections were re-run on 29 November.

The CCM retained its control of the country, with its candidate Benjamin Mkapa winning the presidential election, and the party winning 186 of the 232 directly-elected seats in the National Assembly. Voter turnout was 77% of the 8,929,969 registered voters.

== Electoral system ==
The National Assembly consisted of 232 directly-elected seats (182 on the mainland and 50 on Zanzibar), 37 seats for women MPs allocated based on the proportion constituency seats won, five members were elected by the House of Representatives of Zanzibar and ten members nominated by the President. The Attorney General was also an ex-officio member, resulting in a total of 285 MPs.

== Conduct ==
The election was characterized by irregularities.

In Zanzibar there was widespread allegations of vote-rigging, with the ruling CCM Zanzibar presidential candidate Salmin Amour being declared the victor by a margin of less than 1%. In protest, the losing candidate from the Zanzibar-based Civic United Front (CUF), Seif Shariff Hamad, refused to recognize Amour as president. The CUF boycotted the new government, resulting in 18 of their members being arrested and charged with treason. In June 1999 an agreement was reached between the CCM and the CUF, which led to an end of the CUF boycott.

== Results ==
=== President ===
| Candidate | Party | Votes | % |
|---|---|---|---|
| Benjamin Mkapa | Chama Cha Mapinduzi | 4,026,422 | 61.82 |
| Augustino Mrema | NCCR–Mageuzi | 1,808,616 | 27.77 |
| Ibrahim Lipumba | Civic United Front | 418,973 | 6.43 |
| John Cheyo | United Democratic Party | 258,734 | 3.97 |
| Total | | 6,512,745 | 100.00 |
| Valid votes | | 6,512,745 | 95.12 |
| Invalid/blank votes | | 333,936 | 4.88 |
| Total votes | | 6,846,681 | 100.00 |
| Registered voters/turnout | | 8,929,969 | 76.67 |
Source: EISA, African Elections Database

=== National Assembly ===
| Party | Votes | % | Seats | | |
| Party | Votes | % | Constitutency | Women | Total |
|---|---|---|---|---|---|
| Chama Cha Mapinduzi | 3,814,206 | 59.22 | 186 | 28 | 214 |
| NCCR–Mageuzi | 1,406,343 | 21.83 | 16 | 3 | 19 |
| Chadema | 396,825 | 6.16 | 3 | 1 | 4 |
| Civic United Front | 323,432 | 5.02 | 24 | 4 | 28 |
| United Democratic Party | 213,547 | 3.32 | 3 | 1 | 4 |
| Tanzania Democratic Alliance | 76,636 | 1.19 | 0 | 0 | 0 |
| National Reconstruction Alliance | 60,707 | 0.94 | 0 | 0 | 0 |
| Union for Multiparty Democracy | 41,257 | 0.64 | 0 | 0 | 0 |
| Tanzania Labour Party | 27,963 | 0.43 | 0 | 0 | 0 |
| National League for Democracy | 26,666 | 0.41 | 0 | 0 | 0 |
| United People's Democratic Party | 19,841 | 0.31 | 0 | 0 | 0 |
| Popular National Party | 18,155 | 0.28 | 0 | 0 | 0 |
| Progressive Party of Tanzania – Maendeleo | 15,335 | 0.24 | 0 | 0 | 0 |
| Presidential appointees | | | – | – | 10 |
| Elected by Zanzibar House of Representatives | | | – | – | 5 |
| Attorney-General | | | – | – | 1 |
| Total | 6,440,913 | 100.00 | 232 | 37 | 285 |
| Valid votes | 6,440,913 | 94.07 | | | |
| Invalid/blank votes | 405,768 | 5.93 | | | |
| Total votes | 6,846,681 | 100.00 | | | |
| Registered voters/turnout | 8,929,969 | 76.67 | | | |
Source: EISA
