= 2016 Zanzibari general election =

2016 Zanzibari Presidential election
← 2015	20 March 2016	2020 →
- Registered: 503,580
- Turnout: 67.9%
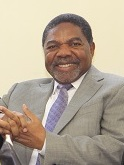
Nominee	Ali Shein
Party	CCM
Popular vote	299,982
Percentage	91.4%
President before election
Ali Mohamed Shein
CCM
Elected President
Ali Mohamed Shein
CCM

General elections were held in Zanzibar on 20 March 2016. The 2016 election was conducted as a re-run of the annulled 2015 Zanzibari general election. Only the Zanzibari President, Zanzibar House of Representatives and local legislative elections were part of the re-run.

The election had a seemingly low turnover compared to previous elections as the opposition had boycotted the re-run. The opposition criticize the government in rigging the system against them after the election they believed to be victorious was annulled in 2015.

Due to the boycott, Ali Mohamed Shein won the presidency by a landslide and continued his second term.

== Results ==
=== President ===
Candidate	Party	Votes	%
Ali Mohamed Shein	Chama Cha Mapinduzi	299,982	91.37
Hamad Rashid Mohamed	Alliance for Democratic Change	9,734	2.96
Seif Sharif Hamad	Civic United Front	6,076	1.85
Issa Mohammed Zonga	Sauti ya Umma	2,018	0.61
Ali Khatib Ali	Chama Cha Kijamii	1,980	0.60
Juma Ali Khatib	Tanzania Democratic Alliance	1,562	0.48
Hafidh Hassan Suleiman	Tanzania Labour Party	1,499	0.46
Kassim Bakari Ali	Jahazi Asilia	1,470	0.45
Said Soud Said	Association of Farmers Party	1,303	0.40
Khamis Idd Lila	Alliance for Change and Transparency	1,225	0.37
Abdulla Kombo Khamis	Democratic Party	512	0.16
Mohammed Rashid Masoud	Chama cha Ukombozi wa Umma	493	0.15
Seif Ali Iddi	National Reconstruction Alliance	266	0.08
Tabu Mussa Juma	Demokrasia Makini	210	0.06
Total		328,330	100.00
Valid votes		328,330	96.04
Invalid/blank votes		13,538	3.96
Total votes		341,868	100.00
Registered voters/turnout		503,580	67.89
Source: Zanzibar Election Commission
