= 2000 Tanzanian general election =

← 1995	29 October 2000	2005 →
- Presidential election
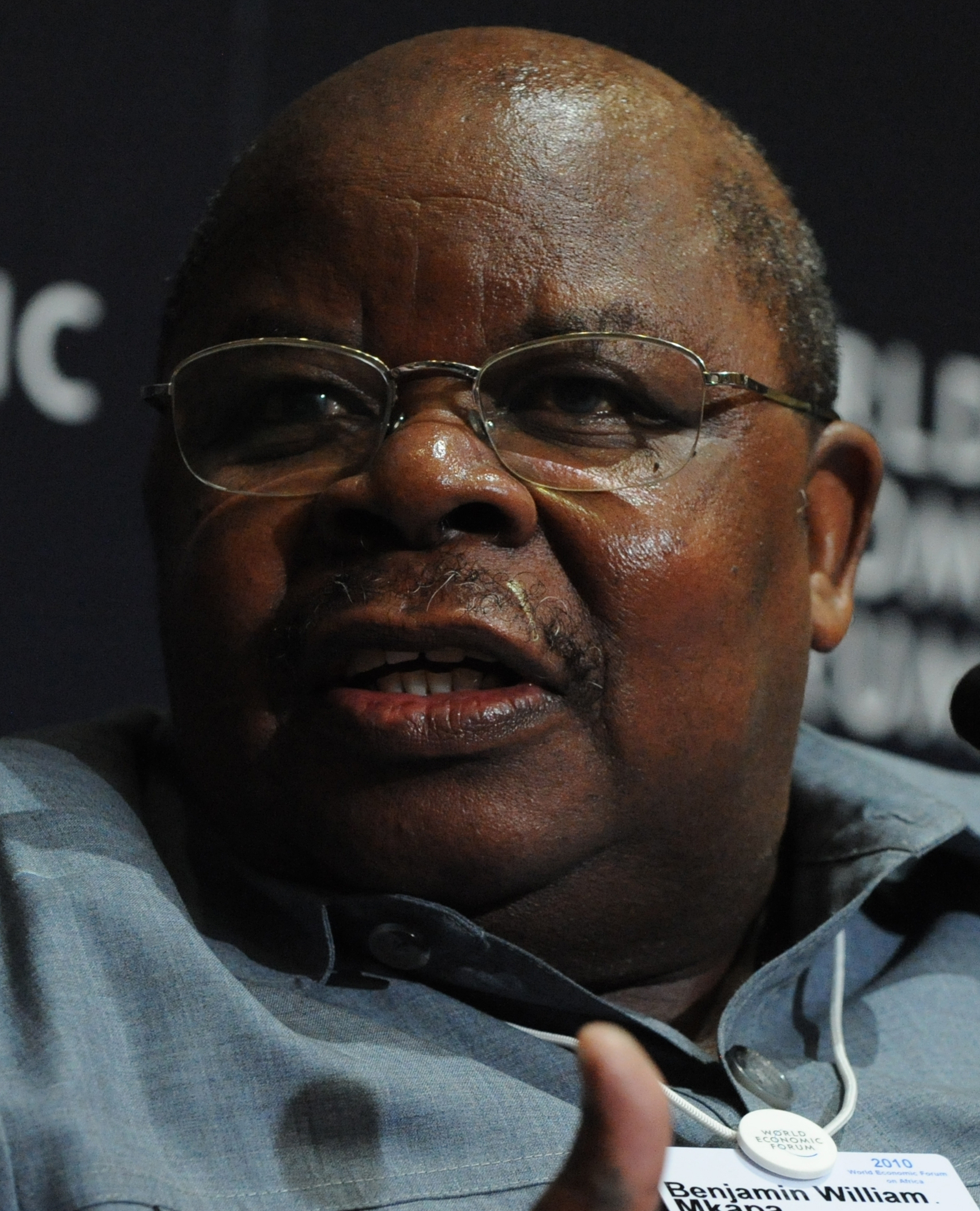

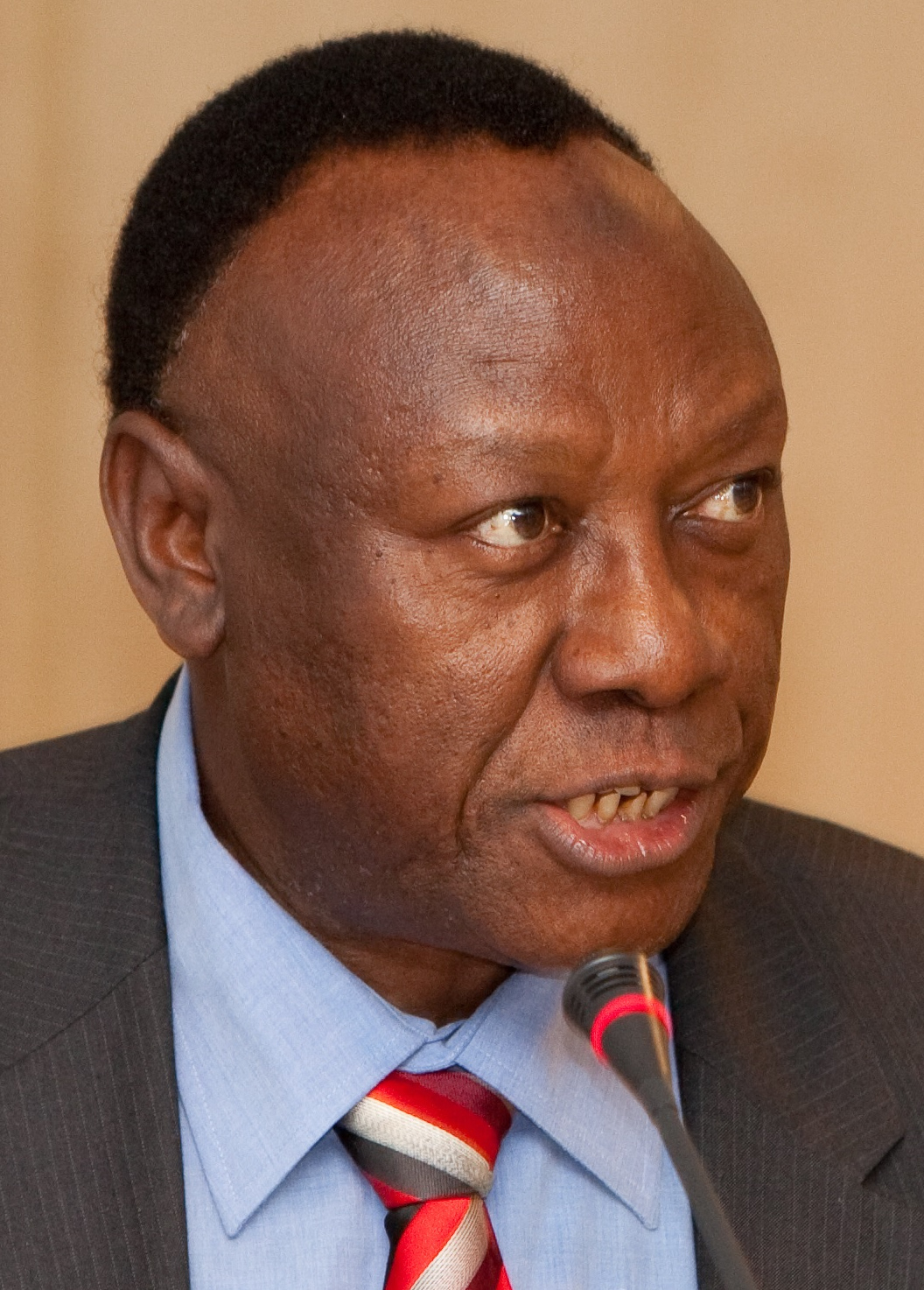
Nominee	Benjamin Mkapa	Ibrahim Lipumba
Party	CCM	Civic United Front
Popular vote	5,863,201	1,329,077
Percentage	71.74%	16.26%
President before election
Benjamin Mkapa
CCM
Elected President
Benjamin Mkapa
CCM

General elections were held in Tanzania on 29 October 2000, with sixteen constituencies in Zanzibar voting again on 5 November due to problems with distributing election material. The second general elections since the restoration of multi-party democracy in 1992, they were won by the ruling Chama Cha Mapinduzi party, which claimed 202 of the 231 constituency seats in the National Assembly, and whose candidate, Benjamin Mkapa, won the presidential election.

After the election, 48 additional seats for women MPs were awarded to the parties based on the proportion of seats in the National Assembly, whilst five members were elected by the House of Representatives of Zanzibar, ten members were nominated by the President, and the Attorney General was also an ex officio member, giving a total number of MPs of 295.

== Results ==
=== President ===
Candidate	Party	Votes	%
Benjamin Mkapa	Chama Cha Mapinduzi	5,863,201	71.74
Ibrahim Lipumba	Civic United Front	1,329,077	16.26
Augustino Mrema	NCCR–Mageuzi	637,115	7.80
John Cheyo	United Democratic Party	342,891	4.20
Total		8,172,284	100.00
Valid votes		8,172,284	95.95
Invalid/blank votes		345,314	4.05
Total votes		8,517,598	100.00
Registered voters/turnout		10,088,484	84.43

=== National Assembly ===
Party	Votes	%	Seats			
Party	Votes	%	Constituency	Women	Total	+/–
Chama Cha Mapinduzi	4,628,127	65.19	202	41	243	+29
Civic United Front	890,044	12.54	17	4	21	–7
Tanzania Labour Party	652,504	9.19	4	1	5	+5
United Democratic Party	315,303	4.44	3	1	4	0
Chadema	300,567	4.23	4	1	5	+1
NCCR–Mageuzi	256,591	3.61	1	0	1	–18
United People's Democratic Party	14,789	0.21	0	0	0	0
Popular National Party	11,731	0.17	0	0	0	0
Progressive Party of Tanzania – Maendeleo	10,206	0.14	0	0	0	0
Tanzania Democratic Alliance	9,647	0.14	0	0	0	0
Union for Multiparty Democracy	7,550	0.11	0	0	0	0
National League for Democracy	2,507	0.04	0	0	0	0
National Reconstruction Alliance	70	0.00	0	0	0	0
Presidential appointees			–	–	10	0
Elected by Zanzibar House of Representatives			–	–	5	0
Attorney-General			–	–	1	0
Total	7,099,636	100.00	231	48	295	+10
Valid votes	7,099,636	95.39				
Invalid/blank votes	343,162	4.61				
Total votes	7,442,798	100.00				
Registered voters/turnout	10,088,484	73.78				

== See also ==
- 2000 Zanzibari general election
