= 2010 Zanzibari general election =

2010 Zanzibari presidential election
| ← 2005 | 31 October 2010 | 2015 → |
- Registered: 407,658
- Turnout: 89.52%
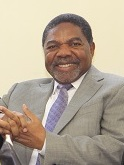

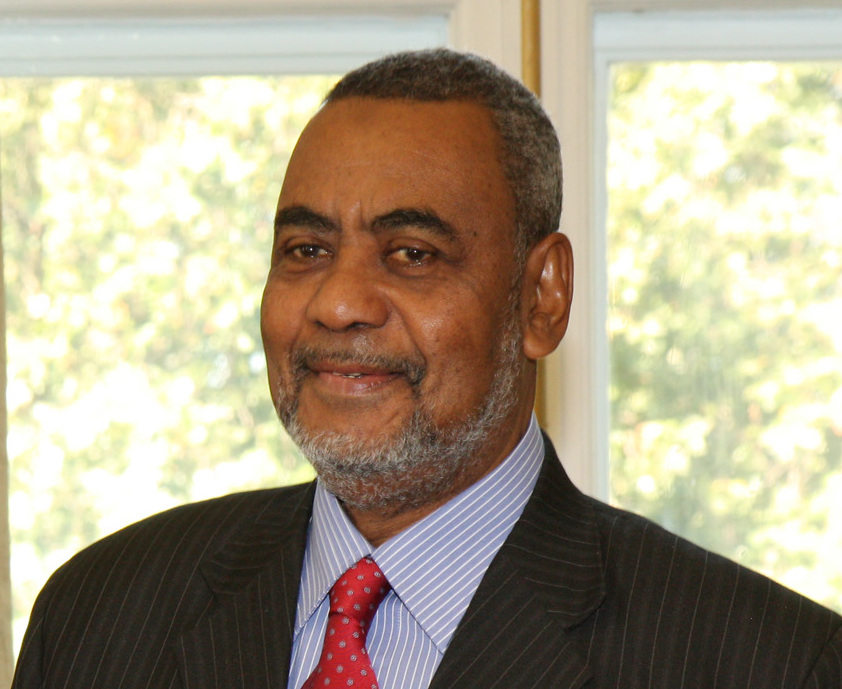
| Party | CCM | Civic United Front |
| Popular vote | 179,809 | 176,338 |
| Percentage | 50.11% | 49.14% |
President before election
Amani Abeid Karume
CCM
Elected President
Ali Mohamed Shein
CCM

General elections were held in Zanzibar on 31 October 2010 alongside the 2010 Tanzanian general elections. Amani Abeid Karume the president of Zanzibar stepped down after completing 2 terms in office. The presidential elections were won by Ali Mohamed Shein of Chama Cha Mapinduzi. Zanzibar elections have always been highly contested and also subject to post election violence.

To defuse the tensions a Unity government to be formed after the election was proposed, which was put into place after the 2010 Zanzibari government of national unity referendum was overwhelmingly accepted by the population.

== Results ==
=== President ===
| Candidate | Party | Votes | % |
|---|---|---|---|
| Ali Mohamed Shein | Chama Cha Mapinduzi | 179,809 | 50.11 |
| Seif Sharif Hamad | Civic United Front | 176,338 | 49.14 |
| Kassim Bakari Ali | Jahazi Asilia | 803 | 0.22 |
| Haji Khamis Haji | National Reconstruction Alliance | 525 | 0.15 |
| Juma Ali Khatib | Tanzania Democratic Alliance | 497 | 0.14 |
| Said Soud Said | Association of Farmers Party | 480 | 0.13 |
| Ambar Haji Khamis | NCCR–Mageuzi | 363 | 0.10 |
| Total | | 358,815 | 100.00 |
| Valid votes | | 358,815 | 98.33 |
| Invalid/blank votes | | 6,109 | 1.67 |
| Total votes | | 364,924 | 100.00 |
| Registered voters/turnout | | 407,658 | 89.52 |
Source: African Elections Database

=== House of Representatives ===
| Party | Votes | % | Seats | | |
| Party | Votes | % | Constituency | Women | Total |
|---|---|---|---|---|---|
| Chama Cha Mapinduzi | 178,091 | 50.25 | 28 | 11 | 39 |
| Civic United Front | 168,082 | 47.43 | 22 | 9 | 31 |
| Jahazi Asilia | 3,567 | 1.01 | 0 | 0 | 0 |
| Chadema | 2,175 | 0.61 | 0 | 0 | 0 |
| NCCR–Mageuzi | 1,046 | 0.30 | 0 | 0 | 0 |
| Tanzania Democratic Alliance | 651 | 0.18 | 0 | 0 | 0 |
| Tanzania Labour Party | 267 | 0.08 | 0 | 0 | 0 |
| Sauti ya Umma | 160 | 0.05 | 0 | 0 | 0 |
| National Reconstruction Alliance | 111 | 0.03 | 0 | 0 | 0 |
| Association of Farmers Party | 91 | 0.03 | 0 | 0 | 0 |
| Demokrasia Makini | 84 | 0.02 | 0 | 0 | 0 |
| Democratic Party | 61 | 0.02 | 0 | 0 | 0 |
| Appointed | | | – | – | 10 |
| Speaker and Attorney General | | | – | – | 2 |
| Total | 354,386 | 100.00 | 50 | 20 | 82 |
| Registered voters/turnout | 407,658 | – | | | |
Source: African Elections Database

== See also ==
- 2010 Tanzanian general election
