= 2015 Zanzibari general election =

2015 Zanzibari presidential election
← 2010	25 October 2015	2016 →
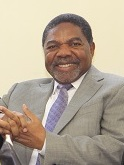

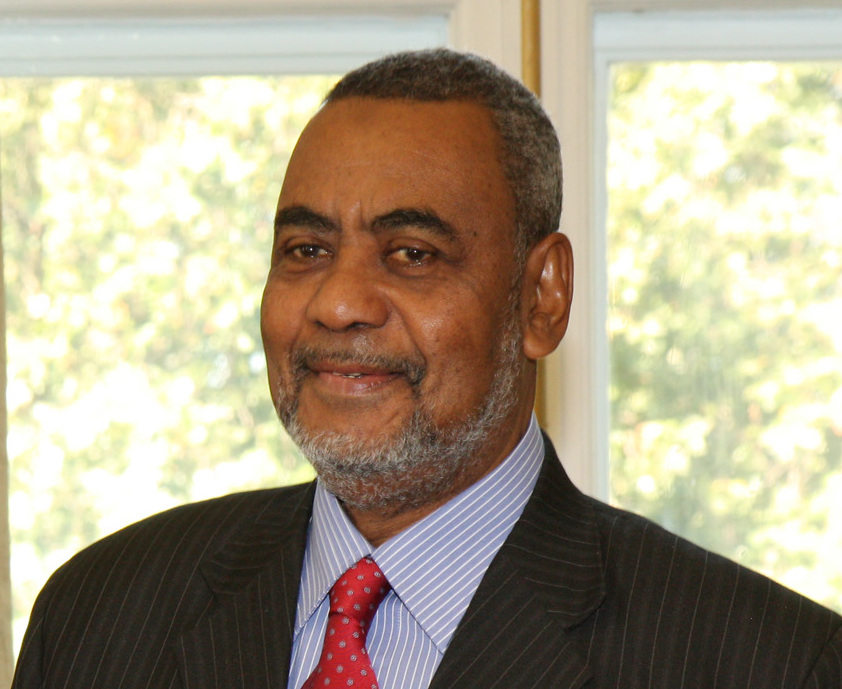
Nominee	Ali Mohamed Shein	Seif Sharif Hamad
Party	CCM	CUF
Popular vote	Annulled	Annulled
President before election
Amani Abeid Karume
CCM
Elected President
Ali Mohamed Shein
CCM

General elections were held in Zanzibar on 25 October 2015 alongside the 2015 Tanzanian general elections. Incumbent president of Zanzibar Ali Mohamed Shein was running for his second term against Zanzibar First Vice President Seif Sharif Hamad.

Following the vote, the Zanzibar election commission annulled the elections citing irregularities and a rerun was held on 20 March 2016.

== Candidates ==
=== Presidential Election ===
There were 14 candidates that qualified to run for the presidential election in 2016.

Candidate	Party
Khamis Idd Lila	Alliance for Change and Transparency (ACT)
Juma Ali Khatib	Association of Farmers Party (ADA-TADEA)
Hamad Rashid Mohamed	Alliance for Democratic Change (ADC)
Said Soud Said	Association of Farmers Party (AFP)
Ali Mohamed Shein	Chama Cha Mapinduzi (CCM)
Ali Khatib Ali	Chama Cha Kijamii (CCK)
Mohammed Rashid Masoud	Chama cha Ukombozi wa Umma (CHAUMA)
Seif Sharif Hamad	Civic United Front (CUF)
Tabu Mussa Juma	Demokrasia Makini (D-Makini)
Abdulla Kombo Khamis	Democratic Party (DP)
Kassim Bakari Ali	Jahazi Asilia
Issa Mohammed Zonga	Sauti ya Umma (SAU)
Seif Ali Iddi	National Reconstruction Alliance (NRA)
Hafidh Hassan Suleiman	Tanzania Labour Party (TLP)

=== House of Representatives Election ===
There were 180 candidates from various parties fighting for 54 electable seats in the Zanzibar House of Representatives.

== Results ==
The votes of the elections were annulled by the Zanzibar Election Commission, citing irregularities in the process and put forward a recommendation for a re-run that was held in 2016. However, only local Zanzibar election results were annulled, the annulment, did not affect the overall outcome of the national presidential elections, meaning that the same ballots that were disqualified for the Zanzibari election were still included in the national count.

== Reactions ==
=== Domestic ===
- Various large opposition members mainly of the political alliance called Ukawa denounced the decision by the Election commission to annul the election, citing it was done to steal the election in favour of CCM.

=== International ===
- United States: The US Embassy in Dar es Salaam said that they were “gravely alarmed” by the annulment and requested the decision be overturned.
- (European Union): A joint statement by the Heads of Election Observer Missions in Tanzania that included members from the Commonwealth of Nations, African Union, Southern African Development Community expressed concern in the decision by the election commission of Zanzibar and requested the show increased transparency in their decision to annul the elections.
