= List of heads of government of Zanzibar =

Chief Minister of Zanzibar
- Flag of Zanzibar
- Seat: Chake-Chake, Pemba Island
- Appointer: Sultan of Zanzibar (1961–1964); President of Zanzibar (1964–2010)
- Formation: 5 June 1961
- First holder: Muhammad Shamte Hamadi
- Final holder: Shamsi Vuai Nahodha
- Abolished: 9 November 2010

This is a list of the heads of government of Zanzibar, an semi-autonomous region of Tanzania. The office of Chief Minister (later changed to Prime Minister) was established in 1961 and abolished in 2010, having been previously abolished between 1964 and 1983.

== List of officeholders ==
Political parties

Coalition government (ZPPP + ZNP)
Afro-Shirazi Party (ASP)
Chama Cha Mapinduzi (CCM)

Other factions

Independent

Status

Denotes acting chief minister

=== Chief ministers of the Sultanate of Zanzibar ===
No.	Portrait	Name (Birth–Death)	Term of office			Political party	Sultan(s)
No.	Portrait	Name (Birth–Death)	Took office	Left office	Time in office	Political party	Sultan(s)
–		Geoffrey Charles Lawrence (1915–1994)	23 February 1961	5 June 1961	102 days	Independent	Abdullah
1		Muhammad Shamte Hamadi (1907–1984)	5 June 1961	24 June 1963	2 years, 19 days	Coalition (ZPPP + ZNP)	Abdullah

=== Prime minister of the Sultanate of Zanzibar ===
No.	Portrait	Name (Birth–Death)	Term of office			Political party	Sultan(s)
No.	Portrait	Name (Birth–Death)	Took office	Left office	Time in office	Political party	Sultan(s)
1		Muhammad Shamte Hamadi (1907–1984)	24 June 1963	12 January 1964 (Deposed)	202 days	Coalition (ZPPP + ZNP)	Abdullah; Jamshid

=== Prime minister of the People's Republic of Zanzibar ===
No.	Portrait	Name (Birth–Death)	Term of office			Political party	President(s)
No.	Portrait	Name (Birth–Death)	Took office	Left office	Time in office	Political party	President(s)
1		Abdullah Kassim Hanga (1932–1969)	12 January 1964	27 April 1964	106 days	ASP	A. Karume

=== Chief ministers of the Revolutionary Government of Zanzibar ===
No.	Portrait	Name (Birth–Death)	Term of office			Political party	President(s)
No.	Portrait	Name (Birth–Death)	Took office	Left office	Time in office	Political party	President(s)
Post abolished (27 April 1964 – 21 February 1983)
1		Ramadani Baki (born 1943)	21 February 1983	6 February 1984	350 days	CCM	Jumbe; Mwinyi
2		Seif Sharif Hamad (1943–2021)	6 February 1984	22 January 1988	4 years, 16 days	CCM	Mwinyi; Wakil
3		Omar Ali Juma (1941–2001)	25 January 1988	1 November 1995	7 years, 280 days	CCM	Wakil; Amour
4		Mohamed Gharib Bilal (born 1945)	1 November 1995	15 November 2000	5 years, 14 days	CCM	Amour; A. A. Karume
5		Shamsi Vuai Nahodha (born 1962)	15 November 2000	9 November 2010	9 years, 359 days	CCM	Karume; Shein
Post abolished (9 November 2010 – present)

== See also ==
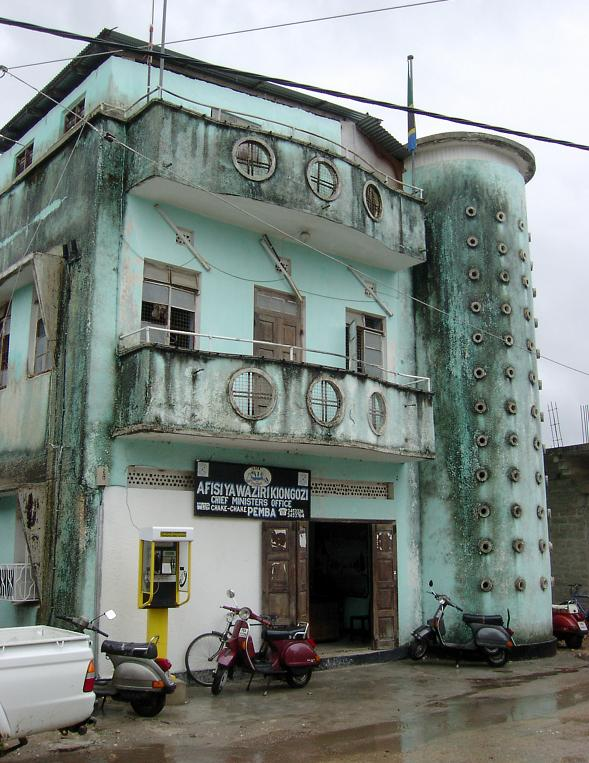
The Chief Minister's Office in Chake-Chake, Pemba Island

- Politics of Tanzania
- List of governors of Tanganyika
- President of Tanzania
  - List of heads of state of Tanzania
- Vice-President of Tanzania
- Prime Minister of Tanzania
  - List of prime ministers of Tanzania
- List of sultans of Zanzibar
- President of Zanzibar
- Vice President of Zanzibar
