= 2020 Zanzibari general election =

- 28 October 2020
- Presidential election
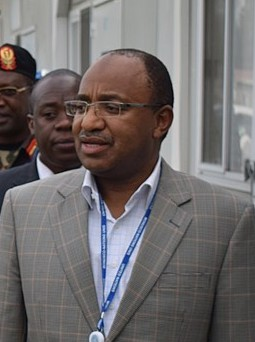

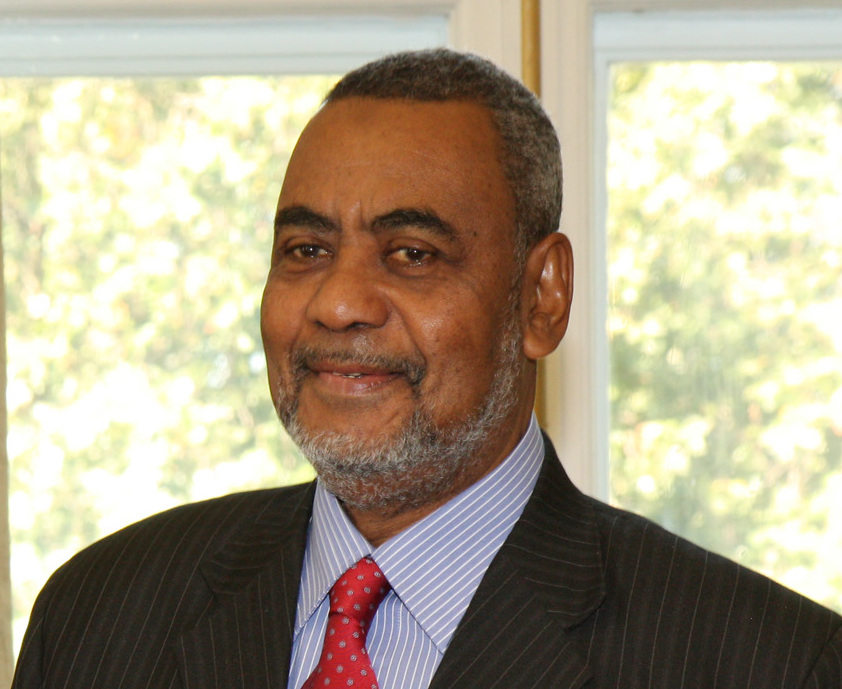
Candidate	Hussein Mwinyi	Seif Sharif Hamad
Party	CCM	ACT–Wazalendo
Popular vote	380,402	99,103
Percentage	77.98%	20.31%

General elections were held in Zanzibar on 28 October 2020 alongside the Tanzanian general elections to elect the President and National Assembly of the Semi-autonomous state of Zanzibar. Voters elect the president, Zanzibar House of Representatives and local government councillors. By convention, the election was held on the last Wednesday of October and is supervised by the Zanzibar Election Commission.

Incumbent president Ali Mohamed Shein was ineligible to be elected to a third term because of term limits and stepped down as president on 3 November. The president of Zanzibar is the third highest position in the Union government of Tanzania.

== Background ==
Elections in Zanzibar have often been contentious. The ruling party Chama Cha Mapinduzi has maintained a government within the isles since independence and has never lost an election. The opposition has continually accused the government of cheating their way through the elections and almost every election has resulted in post-election violence. Said violence in 2015 was most heated after the electoral commission's controversial annulment of the elections, citing irregularities. A rerun was held in 2016, however, but the opposition had boycotted the election, giving the ruling party a landslide victory.

The total number of voters registered was 448,482, a decrease of 55,300 from the 2015 elections. It was estimated that almost 120,000 voters were unable to register due to Zanzibar ID Document requirements.

== Presidential candidates ==
=== Chama Cha Mapinduzi ===
With incumbent president Ali Mohamed Shein constitutionally bared for a third term, the CCM ticket for presidency was hotly contested. Dr Hussein Mwinyi won the nomination against 31 candidates at the CCM party congress held on July 20, 2020.

=== Opposition ===
Seif Sharif Hamad, will be running for a 6th time for the presidency of Zanzibar, however, under the Alliance for Change and Transparency ticket after he left Civic United Front in March 2019. ACT-Wazalendo held their central committee elections on 5 August 2020. The party's 420 central committee members nominated Seif Hamad with 99.76% vote as the Zanzibar presidential candidate. Hamad ran unopposed and only 1 member of the committee cast a vote against Mr Hamad.

== Results ==
=== President ===
Candidate	Party	Votes	%
Hussein Mwinyi	Chama Cha Mapinduzi	380,402	77.98
Seif Sharif Hamad	Alliance for Change and Transparency	99,103	20.31
Othman Rashid Khamis	Chama Cha Kijamii	2,235	0.46
Said Issa Mohammed	Chadema	1,702	0.35
Mussa Haji Kombo	Civic United Front	1,428	0.29
Hamad Rashid Mohammed	Alliance for Democratic Change	996	0.20
Juma Ally Khatib	Tanzania Democratic Alliance	392	0.08
Said Soud Said	Alliance for Tanzania Farmers Party	285	0.06
Ally Omar Juma	Chama cha Ukombozi wa Umma	249	0.05
Hamad Mohamed Ibrahim	United People's Democratic Party	181	0.04
Khamis Fakhi Mgau	National Reconstruction Alliance	160	0.03
Mwalimu Hussein Juma	Tanzania Labour Party	142	0.03
Amour Hassan Amour	Demokrasia Makini	133	0.03
Mfaume Khamis Hassan	National League for Democracy	122	0.03
Shafi Hassan Suleim	Democratic Party	106	0.02
Mohamed Omar Suleiman	Union for Multiparty Democracy	104	0.02
Issa Mohamed Zonga	Sauti ya Umma	102	0.02
Total		487,842	100.00
Valid votes		487,842	97.81
Invalid/blank votes		10,944	2.19
Total votes		498,786	100.00
Registered voters/turnout		566,352	88.07
Source: NBS, Mwananchi

=== House of Representatives ===
Party	Seats			
Party	Elected	Women	Nominated	Total
Chama Cha Mapinduzi	46	18	4	68
Alliance for Change and Transparency	4	0	0	4
Tanzania Democratic Alliance	0	0	1	1
Attorney-General and Speaker	–	–	2	2
Total	50	18	7	75
Source: NBS

== See also ==
- Elections in Tanzania
- 2020 Tanzanian general election
