= Haroun Suleiman =

Zanzibari politician (born 1953)

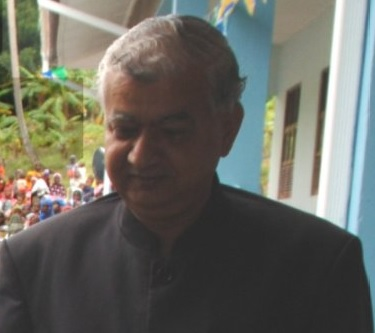

Minister for Labour, People's Economic Empowerment and Cooperatives
- Incumbent
- Assumed office 16 November 2010
- President: Ali Mohamed Shein

Member of the Zanzibar House of Representatives for Makunduchi
- Incumbent
- Assumed office November 2005

Member of Parliament
- In office November 2005 – July 2010
- Constituency: ZHoR

Zanzibar Minister of Education
- In office 2000–2010
- President: Amani Karume

Personal details
- Born: 24 July 1953 (age 73) Sultanate of Zanzibar
- Party: CCM; ASP
- Spouse: Khadija Omar Daddah
- Children: 5: Fahima; Zainab; Ali; Abdulrahim; Mohammed
- Education: University of Bristol (MEd)
- Profession: Teacher

Haroun Ali Suleiman (born 24 July 1953) is a Zanzibari politician who served as the member of the Tanzanian Parliament from 2005 to 2010.

== Background ==
He is a graduate in Education of Bristol University (U.K.). He was appointed Minister of Education, Culture and Sports in 2000 after being elected Member of House of Representatives, Revolutionary Government of Zanzibar for 2000 – 2005. He has also served in various capacities: Principal Secretary (1996-2000); Deputy Director Planning (1993-5). He was teacher and Education Planner for 22 years. He is keen in gender issues and straightening Basic Education.

== As a Minister of Education and Vocational Training (2000-2010) ==
As Minister of Education and Vocational Training for Zanzibar he established first ever University in Zanzibar, State University of Zanzibar (SUZA). He also successfully managed to do the following;

- New Education Policy (2006)
- Establishment of Vocational training Centers
- Establishment of alternative learning centers
- Construction and Completion of new modern national library
- Construction of new Ministry Headquarters in Zanzibar (Unguja and Pemba)
- Establishment of the first new teachers' training college
- Construction of 19 Modern Secondary Schools
- Distribution of new textbooks for secondary schools (written by Zanzibarians and South Carolina)
- Construction of primary and secondary school.

Mr Haroun Suleiman is a former Minister of Education in Tanzania (Zanzibar) from 2001 up to 2010. As Minister of Education for Zanzibar he worked closely with the SACMEQ National Research Co-ordinators in Zanzibar, and he was appointed as president of SACMEQ (2009-2010). He used evidence from the SACMEQ I and SACMEQ II research results for Zanzibar to lead his Ministry in developing programmes that were aimed at addressing the identified short-comings in the education system. As a result, Zanzibar registered one of the highest levels of improvement in pupil achievement results among SACMEQ school systems between 2000 and 2007. Hon. Suleiman attended all SACMEQ Assembly of Ministers meetings and SACMEQ Managing Committee meetings. He hosted the SACMEQ Managing Committee meeting that was held in Zanzibar in 2005. He presided over the SACMEQ Assembly of Ministers in 2009, and made major contributions to SACMEQ research programmes as the longest serving Minister of Education among SACMEQ school systems.
