= Khalid Salum Mohamed =

Zanzibari/Tanzanian politician

Honourable Khalid Salum Mohamed MP

Minister of Finance and Planning Zanzibar
- Incumbent
- Assumed office 2016
- President: Ali Mohamed Shein

House Representative for Donge
- Incumbent
- Assumed office 2016

Personal details
- Born: 5 October 1961 (age 64)
- Party: CCM
- Education: Sokoine University (BSc); University of Reading (MSc)

Khalid Salum Mohamed (born 5 October 1961) is a Zanzibari/Tanzanian politician and House Representative for Donge Constituency since 2016. Khalid Mohamed was a finalist in the 2020 CCM Zanzibar presidential primaries and lost the nomination to Dr. Hussein Mwinyi.
