= Inauguration of Jakaya Kikwete =

Inauguration of Jakaya Kikwete may refer to:

- First inauguration of Jakaya Kikwete, 2005
- Second inauguration of Jakaya Kikwete, 2010
