= Haji Kheir =

Tanzanian-Zanzibari politician

Haji Omar Kheri

Member of the Zanzibar House of Representatives for Tumbatu
- Incumbent
- Assumed office 1995

Senior Advisor to the President for Political and Social Relations
- Incumbent
- Assumed office 13 June 2023 Serving with Rajab Omar Luhwavi, Abdallah Bulembo, William Lukuvi
- President: Samia Suluhu Hassan
- Preceded by: Office established

Personal details
- Born: 10 January 1960 (age 66) Unguja, Sultanate of Zanzibar
- Party: Chama Cha Mapinduzi

Haji Omar Kheir (born 10 January 1960) is a Tanzanian CCM politician and a member of the Zanzibar House of Representatives representing Tumbatu constituency in the Zanzibar House of Representatives since 1995. In June 2023 he was appointed by President Samia Suluhu Hassan to be an advisor to the President on (political and social relations) together with other three appointees.

He has held various government ministry positions in Zanzibar, he was the Minister of State and Chairman of the Revolutionary Council of Zanzibar, State Minister in the President's Office (Public Service and Good Governance), Minister in the President's Office Regional Authorities and Special Departments, Minister in the President's office (Special Forces), Minister of State (Regional Administration and Local Government and SMZ Units).
