= 2000 Zanzibari general election =

- 29 October 2000; 5 November 2000 (partial re-run)
- Presidential election
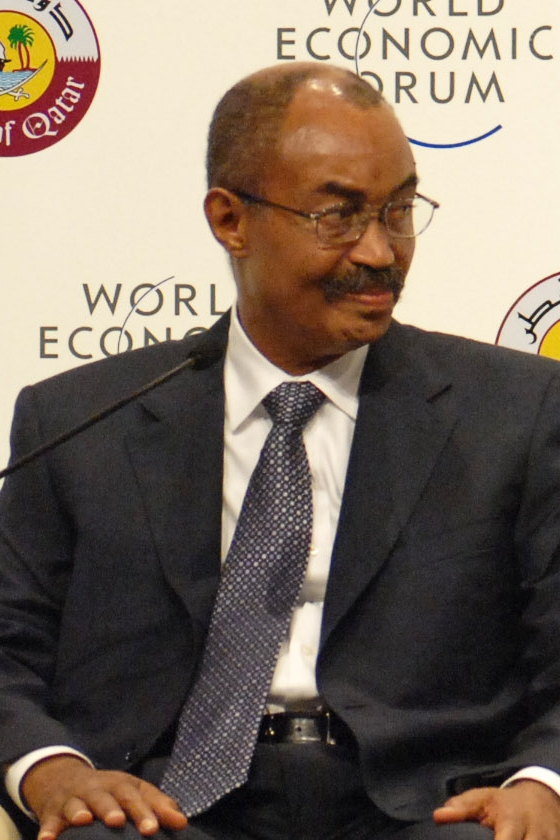

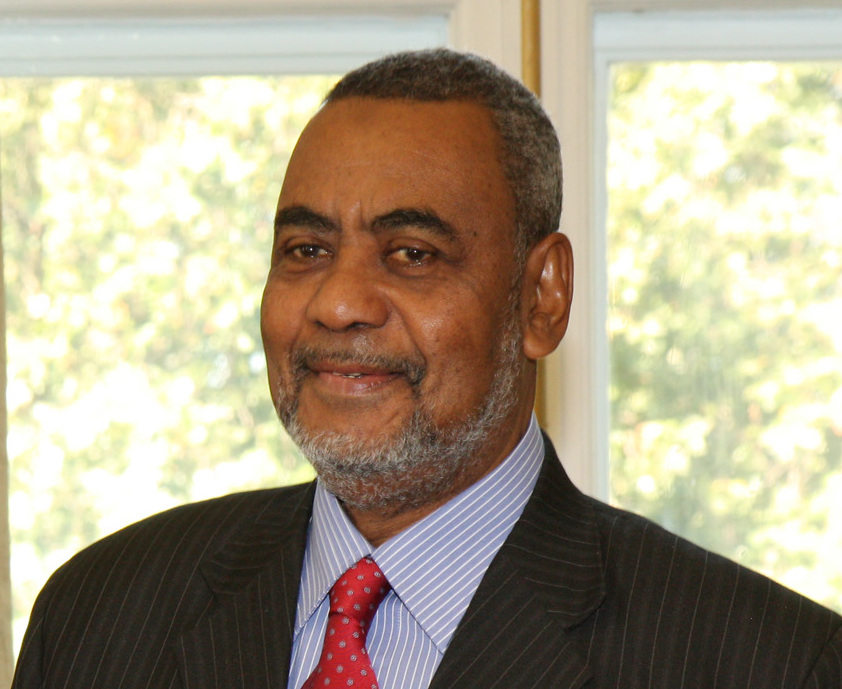
Nominee	Amani Abeid Karume	Seif Sharif Hamad
Party	CCM	CUF
Popular vote	248,095	122,000
Percentage	67.04%	32.96%
President before election
Salmin Amour
CCM
Elected President
Amani Abeid Karume
CCM

General elections were held in Zanzibar on 29 October 2000 alongside the nationwide general elections. There was a re-run in 16 of the 50 House of Representatives constituencies due to irregularities, which was held on 5 November.

In the presidential election, Amani Abeid Karume of the ruling Chama Cha Mapinduzi (CCM) was elected president, while the CCM won 34 of the 50 directly elected seats in the House of Representatives.

== Background ==
After multiparty elections were reinstated throughout Tanzania in 1995, the 1995 general elections in Zanzibar resulted in widespread allegations of vote-rigging, with CCM candidate Salmin Amour being declared the victor by a margin of less than 1%. In protest, the losing Civic United Front (CUF) candidate Seif Shariff Hamad refused to recognise Amour as president, and the CUF boycotted the new government, resulting in 18 of their members being arrested and charged with treason. In June 1999 an agreement was reached between the CCM and the CUF, which led to an end of the CUF boycott.

== Conduct ==
During the 2000 elections, the opposition and electoral observers claimed that electoral fraud had occurred on an even wider scale in Zanzibar. On election day the Zanzibar Electoral Commission cancelled elections in 16 urban constituencies. On 3 November the Commonwealth Observer Group that was monitoring the election, led by Botswanan politician Gaositwe Chiepe, stated in their report that "only a properly conducted and fresh poll, throughout Zanzibar, undertaken by a Commission reformed in line with international good practice, [...] can create confidence in and give credibility to Zanzibar's democracy."

== Results ==
=== President ===
Candidate	Party	Votes	%
Amani Abeid Karume	Chama Cha Mapinduzi	248,095	67.04
Seif Sharif Hamad	Civic United Front	122,000	32.96
Total		370,095	100.00
Source: African Elections Database

=== House of Representatives ===
Party	Seats
Party	Constituency
Chama Cha Mapinduzi	34
Civic United Front	16
Total	50
Source: African Elections Database

== Aftermath ==
Following the elections the CUF called for protests throughout Zanzibar, which were held on 27 January 2001. In the days leading up to 27 January, the state-run news in Zanzibar showed footage from the 1964 Zanzibar Revolution, in a warning against similar violence. On 27 January, at four protests in Wete, Micheweni, Chake-Chake and Zanzibar City, protesters were fired upon by government security forces. Human Rights Watch later stated that 35 people were killed, over 600 injured and hundreds more arrested, with 2,000 Zanzibaris fleeing to Kenya. The subsequent HRW report found that "Tanzanian security and state officials were responsible for serious violations of domestic and international law. Security forces were responsible for extrajudicial executions and an excessive use of force resulting in killings and assaults of unarmed civilians, including those assisting the wounded. Other abuses included assaults on and denial of medical care to the wounded; torture and mistreatment, including rape and sexual abuse; arbitrary arrests and detentions without trial; [and] looting and the destruction of property." Tensions continued until October 2001, when an agreement between CCM and CUF was once again reached, resulting in the creation of an independent commission of inquiry by President Benjamin Mkapa in January 2002.

== See also ==
- 2000 Tanzanian general election
