= President of Zanzibar =

Head of the government of Zanzibar

President of the Revolutionary Government of Zanzibar
- Seal of the president

- Standard of the president

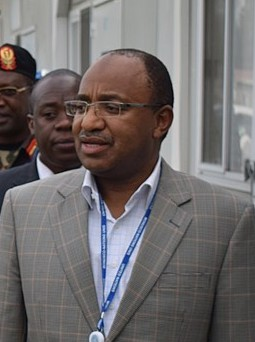
- Incumbent; Hussein Mwinyi since 3 November 2020
- Term length: Five years, renewable once
- Inaugural holder: Abeid Karume
- Formation: 12 January 1964
- Deputy: Vice President of Zanzibar
- Website: www.ikuluzanzibar.go.tz

The president of Zanzibar (Swahili: Rais wa Zanzibar) is the head of the Revolutionary Government of Zanzibar, which is a semi-autonomous government within Tanzania. The current president is Hussein Mwinyi. The president is also the chairman of the Revolutionary Council, whose members are appointed by the president, and some of which must be selected from the House of Representatives.

The president is elected by a plurality. Presidential terms are for five years, and a candidate may be re-elected only once.

Following the Zanzibar Revolution in 1964, Abeid Karume became the first president of Zanzibar, as leader of the Afro-Shirazi Party.

== List of presidents of Zanzibar ==
Political parties

Afro-Shirazi Party (ASP)
Chama Cha Mapinduzi (CCM)

Symbols

^{†} Died in office (assassinated)

=== People's Republic of Zanzibar ===
| No. | Portrait | Name (Birth–Death) | Elected | Term of office | | | Political party | Prime minister(s) |
| No. | Portrait | Name (Birth–Death) | Elected | Took office | Left office | Time in office | Political party | Prime minister(s) |
|---|---|---|---|---|---|---|---|---|
| 1 | | Abeid Karume (1905–1972) | – | 12 January 1964 | 26 April 1964 | 105 days | ASP | Hanga |

=== Revolutionary Government of Zanzibar ===
| No. | Portrait | Name (Birth–Death) | Elected | Term of office | | | Political party | Prime minister(s) |
| No. | Portrait | Name (Birth–Death) | Elected | Took office | Left office | Time in office | Political party | Prime minister(s) |
|---|---|---|---|---|---|---|---|---|
| 1 | | Abeid Karume (1905–1972) | – | 26 April 1964 | 7 April 1972^{[†]} | 7 years, 347 days | ASP | Position abolished |
| 2 | | Aboud Jumbe (1920–2016) | – | 7 April 1972 | 30 January 1984 | 11 years, 298 days | ASP (until 1977) | Position abolished |
| 2 | | Aboud Jumbe (1920–2016) | 1980 | 7 April 1972 | 30 January 1984 | 11 years, 298 days | CCM | Baki |
| 3 | | Ali Hassan Mwinyi (1925–2024) | 1984 | 30 January 1984 | 24 October 1985 | 1 year, 267 days | CCM | Hamad |
| 4 | | Idris Abdul Wakil (1925–2000) | 1985 | 24 October 1985 | 25 October 1990 | 5 years, 1 day | CCM | Hamad; Juma |
| 5 | | Salmin Amour (born 1942) | 1990; 1995 | 25 October 1990 | 8 November 2000 | 10 years, 14 days | CCM | Juma; Bilal |
| 6 | | Amani Abeid Karume (born 1948) | 2000; 2005 | 8 November 2000 | 3 November 2010 | 9 years, 360 days | CCM | Bilal; Nahodha |
| 7 | | Ali Mohamed Shein (born 1948) | 2010; 2015 (Note: Annulled.); 2016 | 3 November 2010 | 3 November 2020 | 10 years | CCM | Nahodha |
| 7 | | Ali Mohamed Shein (born 1948) | 2010; 2015; 2016 | 3 November 2010 | 3 November 2020 | 10 years | CCM | Position abolished |
| 8 | | Hussein Mwinyi (born 1966) | 2020; 2025 | 3 November 2020 | Incumbent | 5 years, 317 days | CCM | Position abolished |

== See also ==
- Politics of Tanzania
- List of governors of Tanganyika
- President of Tanzania
  - List of heads of state of Tanzania
- Vice-President of Tanzania
- Prime Minister of Tanzania
  - List of prime ministers of Tanzania
- List of sultans of Zanzibar
- List of heads of government of Zanzibar
- Vice President of Zanzibar
