= Ali Mwinyigogo =

Former Zanzibari politician

Ali Mwinyigogo is a former Zanzibari politician who was youth and culture minister from 1973 to 1975 under President Skeikh Mwinyi Aboud Jumbe, travelling to Ghana, Israel and the Soviet Union several times.

== Sources ==
- Cinema, Bell Bottoms, and Miniskirts: Struggles over Youth and Citizenship in Revolutionary Zanzibar by Thomas Burgess, International Journal of African Historical Studies, 2002
