= First inauguration of Jakaya Kikwete =

2005 presidential inauguration of Jakaya Kikwete
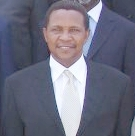
- Jakaya Kikwete
- Date: 21 December 2005
- Location: Uhuru Stadium, Dar es Salaam
- Participants: President Jakaya Kikwete; Ali Mohamed Shein

The first inauguration of Jakaya Kikwete as the 4th president of Tanzania took place on Wednesday, 21 December 2005. It marked the commencement of the first five-year term of Jakaya Kikwete as President and Ali Mohamed Shein as Vice President.

Kikwete won the 2005 presidential election by a landslide receiving 80.28 percent of the popular vote.

== Attendance ==
=== Dignitaries ===
Heads of state and government
Botswana	President	Festus Mogae
Burundi	President	Pierre Nkurunziza
Comoros	President	Azali Assoumani
Democratic Republic of the Congo	President	Joseph Kabila
Ethiopia	Prime Minister	Meles Zenawi
Kenya	President	Mwai Kibaki
Lesotho	King	Letsie III
Malawi	President	Bingu wa Mutharika
Mozambique	President	Armando Guebuza
Rwanda	President	Paul Kagame
South Africa	President	Thabo Mbeki
Sudan	President	Omar al-Bashir
Uganda	President	Yoweri Museveni
Zambia	President	Levy Mwanawasa
Zimbabwe	President	Robert Mugabe
Government leaders
Angola	Foreign Minister	João Bernardo de Miranda
South Africa	Foreign Minister	Nkosazana Dlamini-Zuma
United States	Assistant Secretary of State	Jendayi Frazer
Former leaders
Kenya	President	Daniel arap Moi
Tanzania	President	Ali Hassan Mwinyi
