= Revolutionary Government of Zanzibar =

Semi-autonomous government of Zanzibar

- Coat of arms

Overview
- Established: 12 January 1964; 62 years ago
- State: Zanzibar
- Leader: President Hussein_Mwinyi
- Main organ: Revolutionary Council of Zanzibar
- Responsible to: House of Representatives of Zanzibar
- Annual budget: US$10,492,288.83 (2026–2027)

The Revolutionary Government of Zanzibar is a semi-autonomous government within Tanzania covering Zanzibar, which consists of the northern part of the Zanzibar Archipelago, mainly the islands of Unguja and Pemba.

== Structure ==
The government is made up of a Revolutionary Council and a House of Representatives of Zanzibar. The head of the government is the President of Zanzibar, who is also the chairman of the Revolutionary Council, currently Dr. Hussein Mwinyi.

== See also ==
- Federacy
