= Ramadani Baki =

Zanzibari politician

1st Chief Minister of Zanzibar
- In office 21 February 1983 – 6 February 1984
- President: Aboud Jumbe
- Succeeded by: Seif Sharif Hamad

Personal details
- Born: 1943 (age 82–83)
- Party: CCM

Ramadani Baki (born 1943) was Chief Minister of Zanzibar from 21 February 1983 to 6 February 1984.
