= Seif Rashidi =

Tanzanian politician

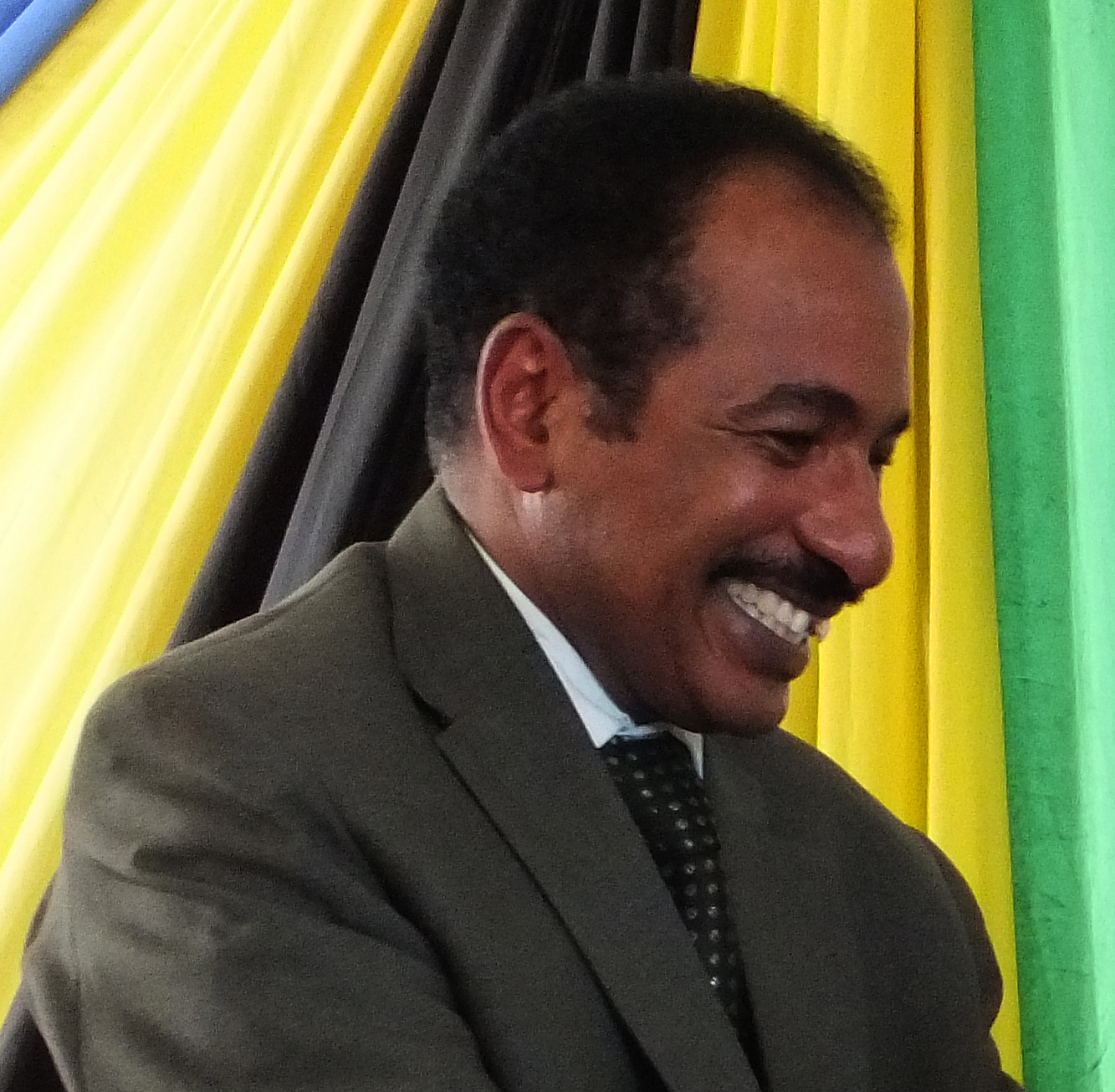

Minister of Health and Social Welfare
- In office 20 January 2014 – 5 November 2015
- President: Jhon Pombe Magufuli
- Preceded by: Hussein Mwinyi

Deputy Minister of Health and Social Welfare
- In office 7 May 2012 – 20 January 2014
- Minister: Hussein Mwinyi
- Succeeded by: Stephen Kebwe

Member of Parliament for Rufiji
- In office November 2010 – July 2015
- Preceded by: Idris Mtulia

Personal details
- Born: Seif Seleman Rashidi; 16 January 1957 (age 69) Tanganyika
- Party: CCM
- Education: Ifakara Medical Training Centre – (Dip): KCMUCo (Kilimanjaro Christian Medical University College) – (AdvDip); Queen Margaret University (formerly, Queen Margaret College) – (MPH); Newcastle University – (PhD)

Seif Seleman Rashidi (born 16 January 1957) is a Tanzanian CCM politician and member of parliament for Rufiji constituency since 2010. He is the Minister of Health and Social Welfare.
