= United Democratic Party (Tanzania) =

Political party in Tanzania

United Democratic Party Chama cha UDP (Swahili)
- Abbreviation: UDP
- Chairman: John Cheyo
- Founded: 1992
- Headquarters: Dar es Salaam
- Ideology: Liberalism

The United Democratic Party (UDP) is an opposition liberal party in Tanzania. The party is an observer at Liberal International.

== Electoral performance ==
At the 2000 legislative elections, the party won 2 out of 269 seats in the National Assembly. In the presidential elections of the same day, its candidate John Cheyo won 4.2% of the vote.

The party didn't field a presidential candidate on the 14 December 2005 election, but did win one seat in National Assembly elections held on the same day.

== Election results ==
=== Presidential elections ===
| Election | Party candidate | Votes | % | Result |
|---|---|---|---|---|
| 1995 | John Cheyo | 258,734 | 3.97% | Lost ✗ |
| 2000 | John Cheyo | 342,891 | 4.20% | Lost ✗ |
| 2005 | Did not participate | | | |
| 2010 | Did not participate | | | |
| 2015 | Did not participate | | | |
| 2020 | Did not participate | | | |
| 2025 | Saum Hussein Rashid | 21,964 | 0.07% | Lost ✗ |

== See also ==
- Liberalism
- Contributions to liberal theory
- Liberalism worldwide
- List of liberal parties
- Liberal democracy
