= Stephen Kebwe =

Tanzanian politician

Honourable Dr Stephen Kebwe MP

Deputy Minister of Health and Social Welfare
- Incumbent
- Assumed office 20 January 2014
- Minister: Seif Rashidi
- Preceded by: Seif Rashidi

Member of Parliament for Serengeti
- Incumbent
- Assumed office November 2010
- Preceded by: James Wanyancha

Personal details
- Born: 13 July 1957 (age 68) Tanganyika
- Party: Chama Cha Mapinduzi

Stephen Kebwe (born 13 July 1957) is a Tanzanian CCM politician and Member of Parliament for Serengeti constituency since 2010. 2015-2019 Regional Commissioner for Morogoro
