= Shamsi Vuai Nahodha =

Tanzanian politician

Honourable Shamsi Vuai Nahodha MP

Minister of Defence and National Service
- In office 7 May 2012 – 20 December 2013
- President: Jakaya Kikwete
- Preceded by: Hussein Mwinyi
- Succeeded by: Hussein Mwinyi

19th Minister of Home Affairs
- In office 28 November 2010 – 7 May 2012
- Preceded by: Lawrence Masha
- Succeeded by: Emmanuel Nchimbi

Member of Parliament
- Incumbent
- Assumed office November 2010
- Appointed by: Jakaya Kikwete
- Constituency: None (Nominated MP)

5th Chief Minister of Zanzibar
- In office 15 November 2000 – 9 November 2010
- President: Amani Karume
- Preceded by: Mohamed Gharib Bilal
- Succeeded by: Post abolished

Member of the Zanzibar House of Representatives
- In office 2000–2010
- Constituency: Mwera (2000-2005); Mwanakwerekwe (2005-2010)

Personal details
- Born: 20 November 1962 (age 63) Zanzibar
- Party: CCM
- Education: UDSM (BA); CFR (PGDip); OUT (LL.B)

Shamsi Vuai Nahodha (born 20 November 1962) is a Tanzanian CCM politician and a nominated Member of Parliament since 2010 to 2015. He is a former Minister of Defence and National Service.

== Background ==
He was also the Chief Minister of Zanzibar from 15 November 2000 to 9 November 2010, when that position was abolished. On November 9, 2005, he was reappointed Chief Minister by President Amani Abeid Karume. He is a member of the ruling party, Chama Cha Mapinduzi (CCM).
