= Second inauguration of Jakaya Kikwete =

2010 presidential inauguration of Jakaya Kikwete
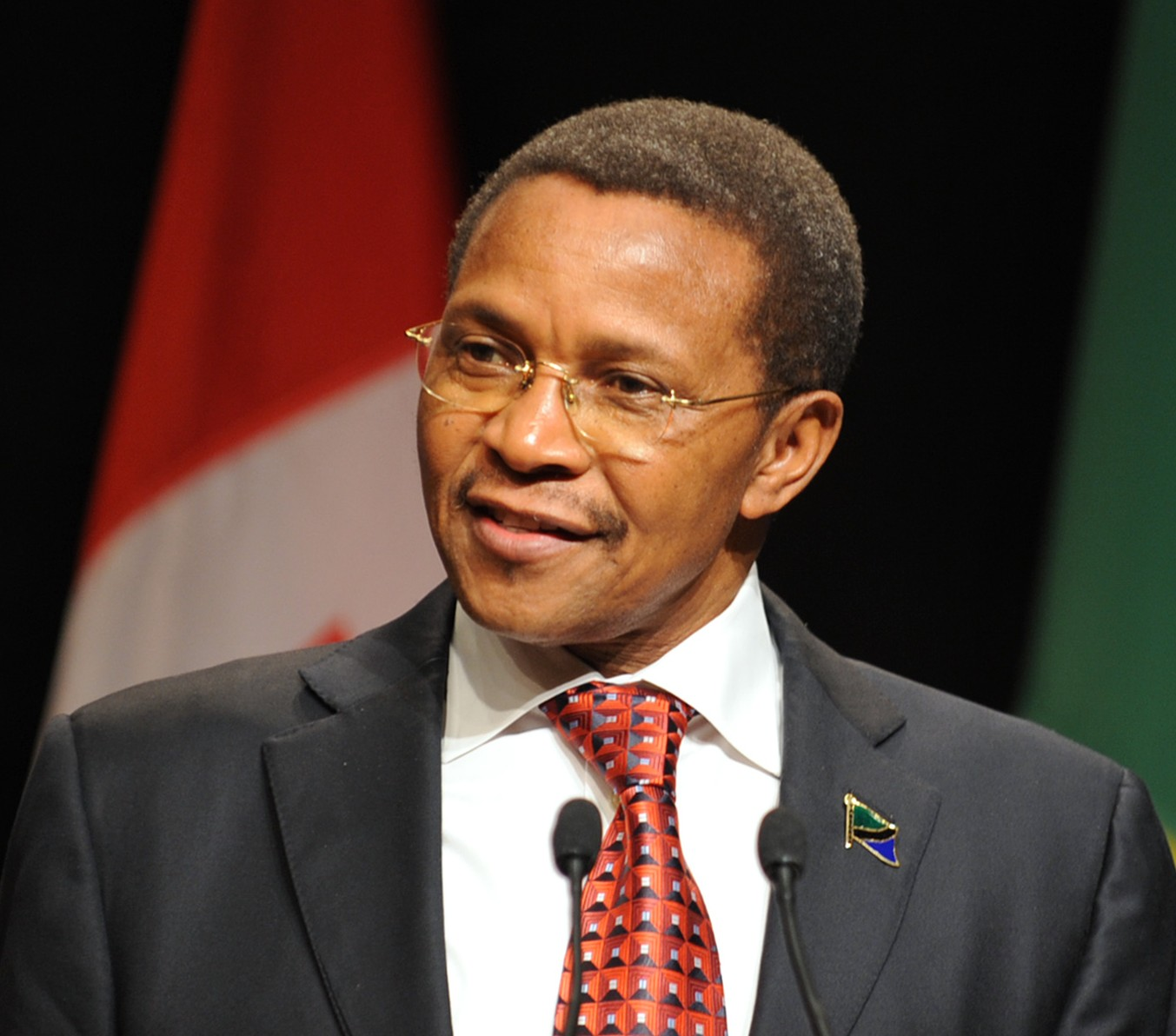
- Jakaya Kikwete
- Date: 6 November 2010
- Location: Uhuru Stadium, Dar es Salaam
- Participants: President Jakaya Kikwete; Mohamed Gharib Bilal

The second inauguration of Jakaya Kikwete as the 4th president of Tanzania took place on Saturday, 6 November 2010. The inauguration marked the beginning of the second and final term of Jakaya Kikwete as president and Mohamed Gharib Bilal as vice president.

== Attendance ==
=== Dignitaries ===
Heads of state and government
Democratic Republic of the Congo	President	Joseph Kabila
Kenya	President	Mwai Kibaki
South Africa	President	Jacob Zuma
Zambia	President	Rupiah Banda
Zimbabwe	President	Robert Mugabe
Government leaders
Uganda	First Deputy Prime Minister	Eriya Kategaya
Zimbabwe	Foreign Minister	Simbarashe Mumbengegwi
Leaders of international organisations
African Union	Commission Chairperson	Jean Ping
Former leaders
Tanzania	President	Ali Hassan Mwinyi
Tanzania	President	Benjamin Mkapa
