= 2010 Zanzibari government of national unity referendum =

Zanzibar GNU referendum
31 July 2010
- Do you agree that a new form of government will be formed after the General Election of 2010?

Results
Choice	Votes	%
Yes	188,705	66.37%
No	95,613	33.63%
Valid votes	284,318	97.02%
Invalid or blank votes	8,721	2.98%
Total votes	293,039	100.00%
Registered voters/turnout	407,669	71.88%

A referendum on establishing a national unity government after the Tanzanian October 2010 elections was held in Zanzibar on 31 July 2010. The proposal was approved, and the losing party in the elections was subsequently allowed to nominate the First Vice President.

== Results ==
Choice	Votes	%
For	188,705	66.37
Against	95,613	33.63
Total	284,318	100.00
Valid votes	284,318	97.02
Invalid/blank votes	8,721	2.98
Total votes	293,039	100.00
Registered voters/turnout	407,669	71.88
Source: African Elections Database
