= Zubeir Ali Maulid =

Tanzanian-Zanzibari politician

Speaker of the Zanzibar House of Representatives
- Incumbent
- Assumed office 20 March 2016
- Deputy: Mgeni Hassan Juma

Member of Parliament for Kwamtipura
- In office November 2005 – November 2010

Personal details
- Born: 25 March 1968 (age 58) Zanzibar
- Party: CCM
- Education: University of Delhi (B.Com)

Military service
- Allegiance: United Rep. of Tanzania
- Branch/service: National Service
- Military camp: Zanzibar
- Duration: 1 year

Zubeir Ali Maulid (born 25 March 1968) is a Tanzanian CCM politician and Member of Parliament for the Kwamtipura constituency in the National Assembly of Tanzania since 2000. He was appointed the speaker of the Zanzibar House of Representatives in 2016.
