= Aboud Jumbe =

President of Zanzibar from 1972 to 1984

Aboud Jumbe Mwinyi

2nd President of Zanzibar
- In office 7 April 1972 – 30 January 1984
- Preceded by: Abeid Karume
- Succeeded by: Ali Hassan Mwinyi

First Vice President of Tanzania
- In office 7 April 1972 – 30 January 1984
- President: Julius Nyerere
- 2nd Vice President: Rashidi Kawawa; Idris Abdul Wakil
- Preceded by: Abeid Karume
- Succeeded by: Ali Hassan Mwinyi

Personal details
- Born: 14 June 1920 Sultanate of Zanzibar
- Died: 14 August 2016 (aged 96) Dar-es-salaam, Tanzania
- Party: CCM
- Other political affiliations: Afro-Shirazi Party

Aboud Jumbe Mwinyi (14 June 1920 – 14 August 2016) was a Tanzanian politician who served as the second President of Zanzibar from 1972 to 1984. He held several other positions, including Chairman of the Zanzibar Revolutionary Council, vice-president of the Union of Tanzania, and the vice-chairman of the Chama Cha Mapinduzi (CCM) party.

He succeeded Abeid Karume as president, following Karume's assassination on 7 April 1972. He was initially elected by the Revolutionary Council as a part of the Afro-Shirazi Party (ASP). While he was in office, in 1977, the two ruling parties of Tanzania merged. In particular, the ASP and the Tanganyika African National Union (TANU), merged to create Tanzania's ruling party, the CCM.

In 1979, Jumbe introduced the first post-revolution constitution of Zanzibar. This separated the powers of the Revolutionary Council and the House of Representatives. Furthermore, the new constitution established elections by universal suffrage, instead of being elected by the Revolutionary Council.

Jumbe died at the age of 96 at his home at Kigamboni, Dar es Salaam, on 14 August 2016.

== See also ==
- Ali Mwinyigogo

Political offices
Preceded by Abeid Karume	President of Zanzibar; 1972–1984	Succeeded by Ali Hassan Mwinyi
