= Ibrahim Lipumba =

Tanzanian encomonist and politician

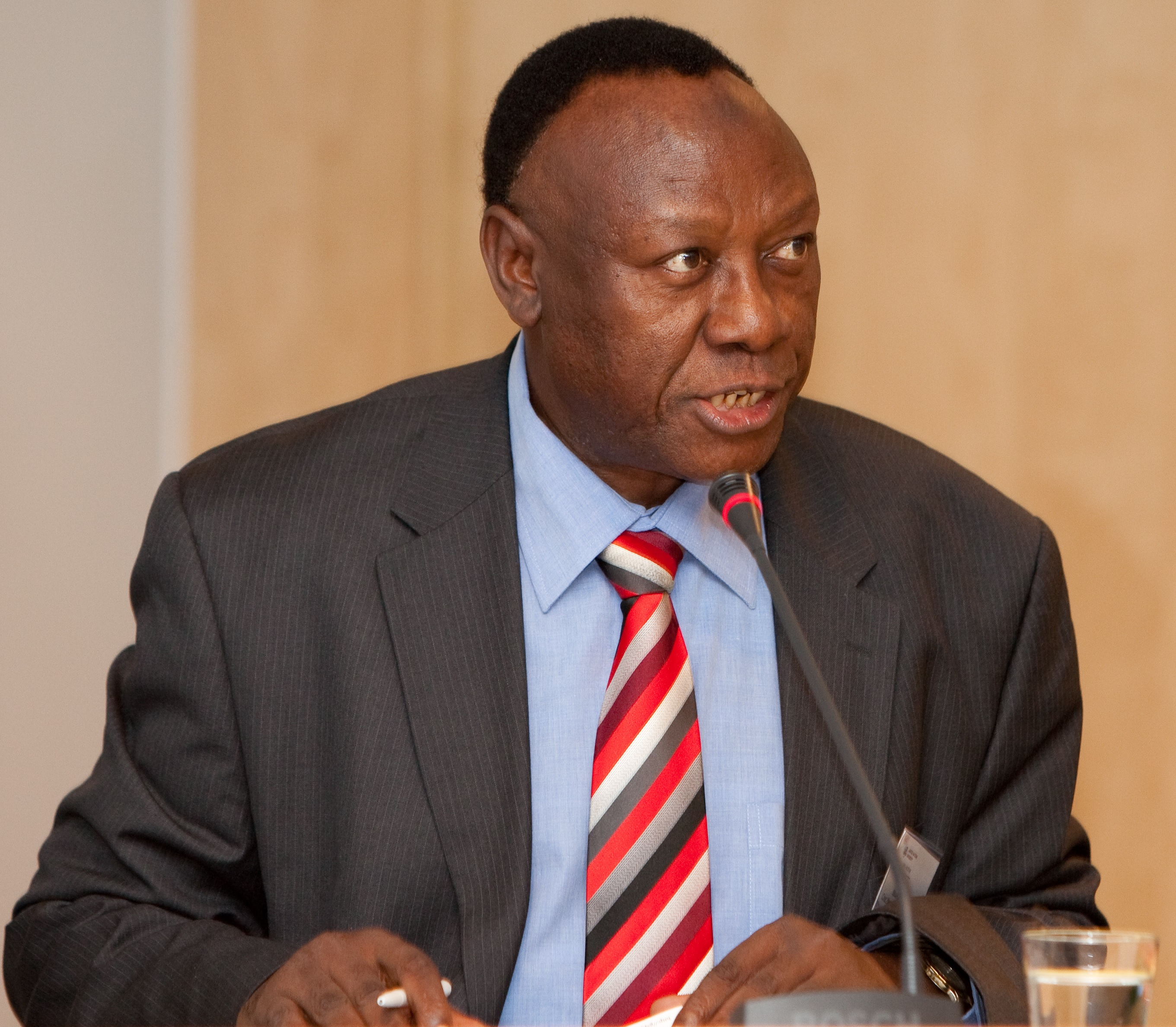

National Chairman of Civic United Front
- Incumbent
- Assumed office 2017
- In office 1999 – 6 August 2015

Personal details
- Born: 6 June 1952 (age 74) Ilolangulu, Tanganyika Territory
- Party: Civic United Front
- Education: Dar es Salaam (BA), (MA); Stanford University (MA), (PhD)
- Profession: Economist

Professor Ibrahim Haruna Lipumba (born 6 June 1952) is a Tanzanian economist and politician. He is the current leader of the Civic United Front and has run as the party's presidential candidate in every election since 1995 (except in 2015).

== Early life and education ==
Lipumba was born in Ilolangulu, a village in the Tabora Region of present-day Tanzania. He was educated at the Swedish Free Mission Primary School (1959–1962), L.A Upper Primary School (1962–1966), Tabora Boys Secondary School (1967–1970) and Pugu Secondary School (1971–1972). He then joined the University of Dar es Salaam in 1973 and graduated with a BA in Economics in 1976. He received his MA in economics from the same university in 1978. He thereafter enrolled at Stanford University in 1978 to pursue his doctoral studies and received his PhD in economics in 1983.

As a professor of economics, he held many positions in the field of education, as a university professor both in the United States and Tanzania, and as a freelance economist. He was an economic adviser to the Ugandan government in the late 1980s and early 1990s.

== Political career ==
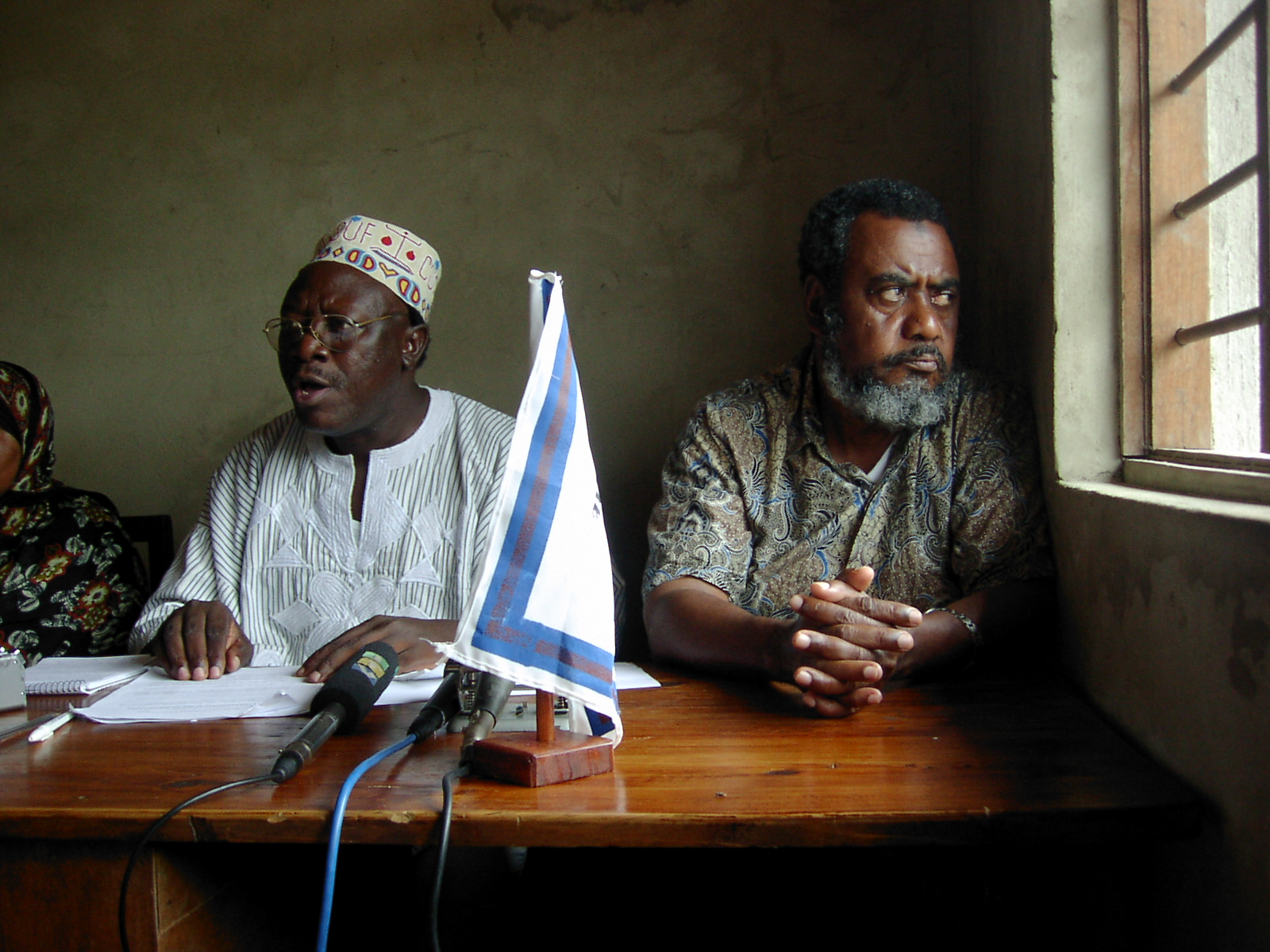
Lipumba (left) at a press conference after the victory of CUF in the Pemba by-elections, 19 May 2003

Lipumba has led the Civic United Front, an opposition party in Tanzania, since 1995. He has also contested every presidential election in Tanzania since the country transitioned to a multi-party system in the early 1990s, with the exception of the 2015 election. In the first multi-party election of 1995, he placed third and won 6.43% of the vote. He finished second behind incumbent president Benjamin Mkapa in 2000, securing 16.26% of the vote.

In the 2005 elections, Lipumba finished in a distant second to Jakaya Kikwete of the ruling Chama Cha Mapinduzi (CCM) party, winning 11.68% of the vote. He came in third in the 2010 presidential election receiving 8.28% of the vote. He finished in fifth place in the 2020 elections, winning only 0.49% of the vote, his worst performance yet.
