= John Cheyo =

Tanzanian politician

Honourable John Cheyo MP

Member of Parliament for Bariadi East
- Incumbent
- Assumed office December 2005
- Preceded by: Danhi Makanga

Chairman of the United Democratic Party
- Incumbent
- Assumed office ?

Personal details
- Party: United Democratic Party

John Momose Cheyo is a Tanzanian UDP politician and Member of Parliament for Bariadi East constituency since 2005.
