= Popular National Party (Tanzania) =

Political party in Tanzania

The Popular National Party (PONA) was a political party in Tanzania. PONA was led by politician and businessman Wilfred R. Mwakitwange. PONA was founded in 1992 and achieved full registration in April 1993. In 2000, the party claimed to have 1.5 million members, or 4.4% of the population. However, this number did not reflect their support in Tanzanian 2000 election, as the party was supported by only 0.7% of the population. The exact number of members remains unknown to the general public. In 2005, PONA was deregistered after the presumed death of its leader, Wilfred Mwakitwange. There is little information known about his death.
