= Revolutionary Council (Zanzibar) =

Part of the semi-autonomous Revolutionary Government of Zanzibar

The Revolutionary Council along with the Zanzibar House of Representatives make up the semi-autonomous Revolutionary Government of Zanzibar. The council's principal role is to advise the President of Zanzibar, who is the Head of government.

The council is made up of the following members.

- The President of Zanzibar, who is the Chairman of the Council
- The 1st and 2nd Vice-presidents
- All Ministers of the Revolutionary Government of Zanzibar
- Other members appointed by the President of Zanzibar
