= Hamad Rashid Mohamed =

Tanzanian politician

Honourable Hamad Rashid Mohamed

Zanzibar Minister of Health
- In office 2018–2020
- Preceded by: Nassor Ahmed Mazrui

Deputy Minister of Home Affairs

Member of Parliament
- In office 2000–2015
- Appointed by: Benjamin Mkapa
- Constituency: None (Nominated MP)

Chairman of Alliance for Democratic Change
- Incumbent
- Assumed office 2012
- Preceded by: Post established

Personal details
- Born: 1 March 1950 (age 76) The Sultanate of Zanzibar
- Party: ADC (2015–); CUF (1972–2012/15?); CCM (1977–1992); ASP (1970–1977)
- Children: 11

Hamad Rashid Mohamed (born 1 March 1950) is a Tanzania-Zanzibarian politician and former cabinet Minister.

In July 2015, he defected from the Civic United Front to the Alliance for Democratic Change.
