= Hussein Mwinyi =

President of Zanzibar since 2020

Honourable Dr Hussein Mwinyi
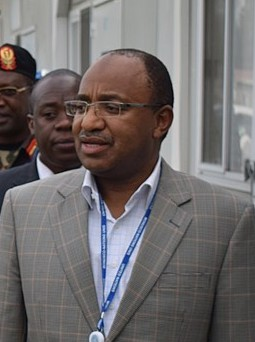
- Mwinyi in 2017

8th President of Zanzibar
- Incumbent
- Assumed office 3 November 2020
- Vice President: Othman Masoud Sharif (first); Hemed Suleiman Abdalla (second)
- Preceded by: Ali Mohamed Shein

Minister of Defence and National Service
- In office 20 January 2014 – 3 November 2020
- Preceded by: Shamsi Vuai Nahodha
- Succeeded by: Elias John Kwandikwa
- In office 13 February 2008 – 7 May 2012
- Preceded by: Juma Kapuya
- Succeeded by: Shamsi Vuai Nahodha

Minister of Health and Social Welfare
- In office 7 May 2012 – 20 January 2014
- Preceded by: Hadji Mponda
- Succeeded by: Seif Rashidi

1st Minister of State for Union Affairs
- In office 6 January 2006 – 13 February 2008
- Vice President: Ali Mohamed Shein
- Succeeded by: Muhammed Seif Khatib

Deputy Minister of Health
- In office 2000–2005
- President: Benjamin Mkapa

Member of Parliament for Kwahani
- In office December 2005 – 2020

Member of Parliament for Mkuranga
- In office October 2000 – 2005
- Succeeded by: Adam Malima

Personal details
- Born: 23 December 1966 (age 59) Unguja, Zanzibar, Tanzania
- Party: CCM
- Spouse: Mama Mariam Mwinyi
- Relations: Abdullah Mwinyi (brother)
- Parents: Ali Hassan Mwinyi (father); Siti Mwinyi (mother)
- Education: Marmara University (MD); Hammersmith Hospital (PhD)
- Profession: Physician
- Medical practice: Muhimbili Hospital (1993–95); HKMU (1998–2000)

Hussein Ali Mwinyi (born 23 December 1966) is a Tanzanian politician who is the 8th and current President of Zanzibar since 2020. The son of former Tanzanian president Ali Hasan Mwinyi, he is a member of the Chama Cha Mapinduzi (CCM) political party.

== Presidency ==
=== 2020 election ===
Mwinyi joined the presidential race in June 2020. In the primary, he beat running mates Shamsi Vuai Nahodha, former Chief Minister of Zanzibar, and Dr. Khalid Mohamed, who served as the Permanent Secretary for the Second Vice President. The CCM’s 164 National Executive Committee members voted in July 2020, with 78.65% in favor of Mwinyi’s nomination to lead the party in the General Election. In order to prevent accusations of corruption, the intra-party election was broadcast live on television. Several NEC delegates cited Mwinyi’s marketability to voters as a primary reason for their choice. The General Election took place on October 28, 2020, in which Mwinyi defeated 14 electoral candidates by collecting 76.27 percent of the vote. 88 percent of Zanzibar's 566,352 registered voters turned out. The CCM or a version of the CCM has not lost an election since Tanzanian independence in 1961. Seif Sharif Hamad, opposition candidate for the political party ACT-Wazalendo, attempt to organize protests against the election result, soon after which he was arrested. Additionally, Zitto Kabwe, leader of ACT-Wazalendo, claimed that a member of the party's Central Committee was hospitalized by Zanzibari soldiers. These incidents are within the context of the 2020 Tanzanian election that took place simultaneously, an election that was deemed as having "credible allegations" of fabricated results by the United States government. Still, the Zanzibar Electoral Commission chairman Hamid Mahmoud Hamid claimed that the election was carried out peacefully, and candidate Juma Ali Khatib of the TADEA opposition party gave Mwinyi his congratulations for winning the election, saying "through the ballot boxes God has appointed you to lead Zanzibaris." Current Tanzanian president Samia Suluhu Hassan, who is also a member of the CCM party along with Mwinyi, praised Seif Sharif Hamad's political "peace and tranquility" on the one year anniversary of Mwinyi's election victory after Hamad's death in February 2021.

=== Corruption ===
On the campaign trail, Mwinyi promised to fight political corruption, saying shortly after being nominated for the CCM flagbearer that “crooked public servants should be extremely intimidated because we are going to crackdown on corruption”. Under his administration, 289 cases have been prosecuted by the Zanzibar Anti-corruption and Economic Crimes Authority, or ZAECA, leading to hundreds of millions of dollars in government funds saved from being embezzled or laundered. This includes the suspension, but not removal, of Zanzibar Social Security Fund director Sabra Issa Machano, and an official for the Tanzania Revenue Authority. Mwinyi was noted by current ZAECA director Mussa Haji Ali as being the first President of Zanzibar to visit the office since its establishment in 2012.

=== Development ===
While his goals for Zanzibar's economic development were criticized by some as "not practical", Zanzibar has seen far higher GDP growth in each quarter of 2021 than in the corresponding period in 2020. In January 2022, the government allocated 149 billion Tanzanian shillings (equivalent to 68 million US Dollars) to develop the archipelago’s blue economy, buying various fishing equipment. In addition, he established Zanzibar's first Ministry of Blue Economy and Fisheries, which was praised by experts for aiming to address the adverse effects of climate change on the country's seaweed industry. He has also made it easier for small business owners to sell their products by expanding permits to thousands of businesses that otherwise would have been shut down by authorities, permits that according to Mwinyi can further be used to secure loans from banks.

=== Women's rights ===
After being the first African state leader to join the HeForShe United Nations alliance, he was named the HeForShe 2021 Champion by the UN Women Tanzania. Hosan Addou, UN Women Country Representative to Tanzania praised Mwinyi for continuing to implement the Wanawake Wanaweze ("Women Can" in Swahili) phase ii that supports women taking on leadership roles in politics. In his first year in office, he eliminated the possibility for bail for all sexual offenses, and said that "We will place greater emphasis on eliminating various forms of violence against women, especially those in rural areas, and also improve social services, reduce maternal mortality, as well take water closer to women"

=== Relationship with China ===
Mwinyi has had a positive relationship with China since he was the Minister of Defence and National Service for Tanzania. During talks with the former Chinese Defense Minister Liang Guangli, Mwinyi noted the "good relations" between China and Tanzania, relations that Liang said have been "sound and smooth...over the past 45 years". China is the largest foreign investor in Zanzibar according to Mwinyi, with $7.6 billion in funds. This especially includes medical support. China invested tens of millions of dollars into Zanzibari hospitals, as well as donating COVID-19 vaccines and providing a small team of medics that over the course of the last ten years treated over 100,000 patients.

=== Relationship with Tanzanian mainland ===
Tanzanian President Samia Suluhu Hassan, the former Vice President who took over after former President John Magufuli's death, posted on her Instagram a photo of Mwinyi on the one year anniversary of his election win, along with the Swahili caption that translates to "we trust you and wish you all the best in building a better Zanzibar. I promise you more cooperation." Despite pushes from some Zanzibaris for independence from Tanzania, Mwinyi has called for the retention of the current relationship between the two governments as ensuring commerce, saying "Zanzibaris are the main consumers of rice from Mainland, including Morogoro, thus we should continue to maintain our union by ensuring that our people are provided with the opportunity to do business without being disturbed."

== Personal life ==
He is married and has four children.

== Honorary academic awards ==
Year	University	Country	Honour
2024	Zanzibar University	Tanzania	Doctor of Economics (Honoris Causa)

Party political offices
Preceded by Ali Mohamed Shein	National Vice Chairman (Zanzibar) of the Chama Cha Mapinduzi; 2020-Present	Incumbent
Political offices
Preceded by Ali Mohamed Shein	President of Zanzibar; 2020–Present	Incumbent
