= Alliance for Tanzania Farmers Party =

Political party in Tanzania

Alliance for Tanzania Farmers Party Chama Cha Wakulima (Swahili)
- Abbreviation: AFP
- Chairman: Said Soud Said
- Secretary-General: Rashid Ligania Rai
- Founded: 2009
- Headquarters: Tanzania
- Colours
- Bunge: 0 / 384
- Zanzibar HoR: 1 / 85

Election symbol
- A farmer plowing the field with an ox

Party flag

Alliance for Tanzania Farmers Party (AFP) is a political party in Tanzania.
