= Seif Sharif Hamad =

First Vice President of Zanzibar (1943–2021)

Maalim Seif Sharif Hamad
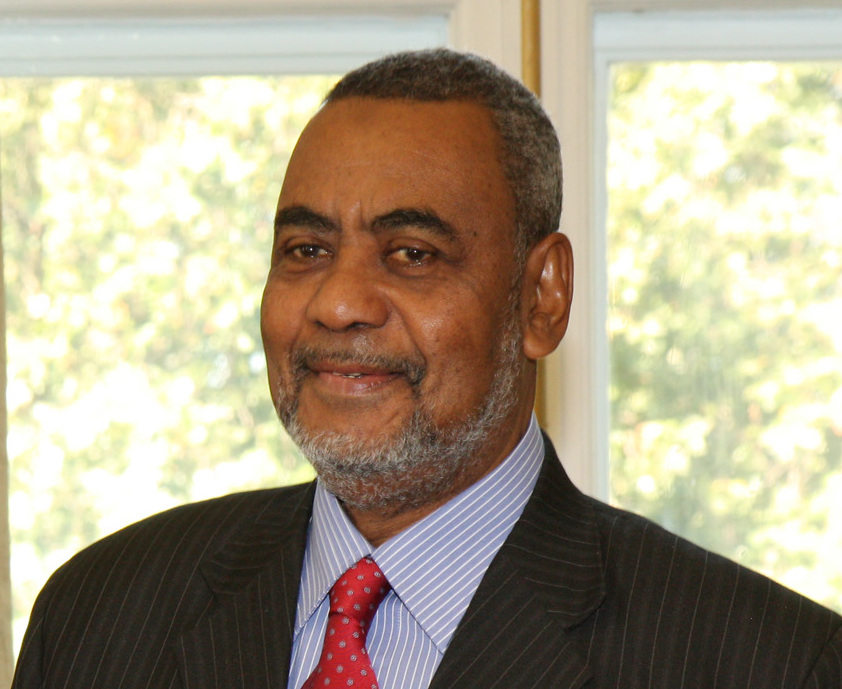
- Hamad in 2012

First Vice President of Zanzibar
- In office 7 December 2020 – 17 February 2021
- President: Hussein Mwinyi
- Preceded by: Himself (2016)
- Succeeded by: Othman Masoud Sharif
- In office 9 November 2010 – March 2016
- President: Ali Mohamed Shein
- Preceded by: Position established
- Succeeded by: Himself (2020)

2nd Chief Minister of Zanzibar
- In office 6 February 1984 – 22 January 1988
- President: Ali Hassan Mwinyi; Idris Abdul Wakil
- Preceded by: Ramadani Baki
- Succeeded by: Omar Ali Juma

Personal details
- Born: 22 October 1943 Pemba, Sultanate of Zanzibar
- Died: 17 February 2021 (aged 77) Dar Es Salaam, Tanzania
- Party: Alliance for Change and Transparency
- Other political affiliations: CCM (1977–1988); CUF (1995–2019)
- Education: UDSM (BA (Hons))

Seif Sharif Hamad (22 October 1943 – 17 February 2021) was a Tanzanian politician who served as the First Vice President of Zanzibar and as Party Chairman of ACT Wazalendo.

He was the secretary-general of the opposition Civic United Front (CUF) party and First Vice President of Zanzibar until 18 March 2019 when he announced his resignation from CUF and joined Alliance for Change and Transparency. He was given an ACT Wazalendo card number One, and he also won the party nomination for the 2020 presidential candidate for Zanzibar.

== Early life and career ==
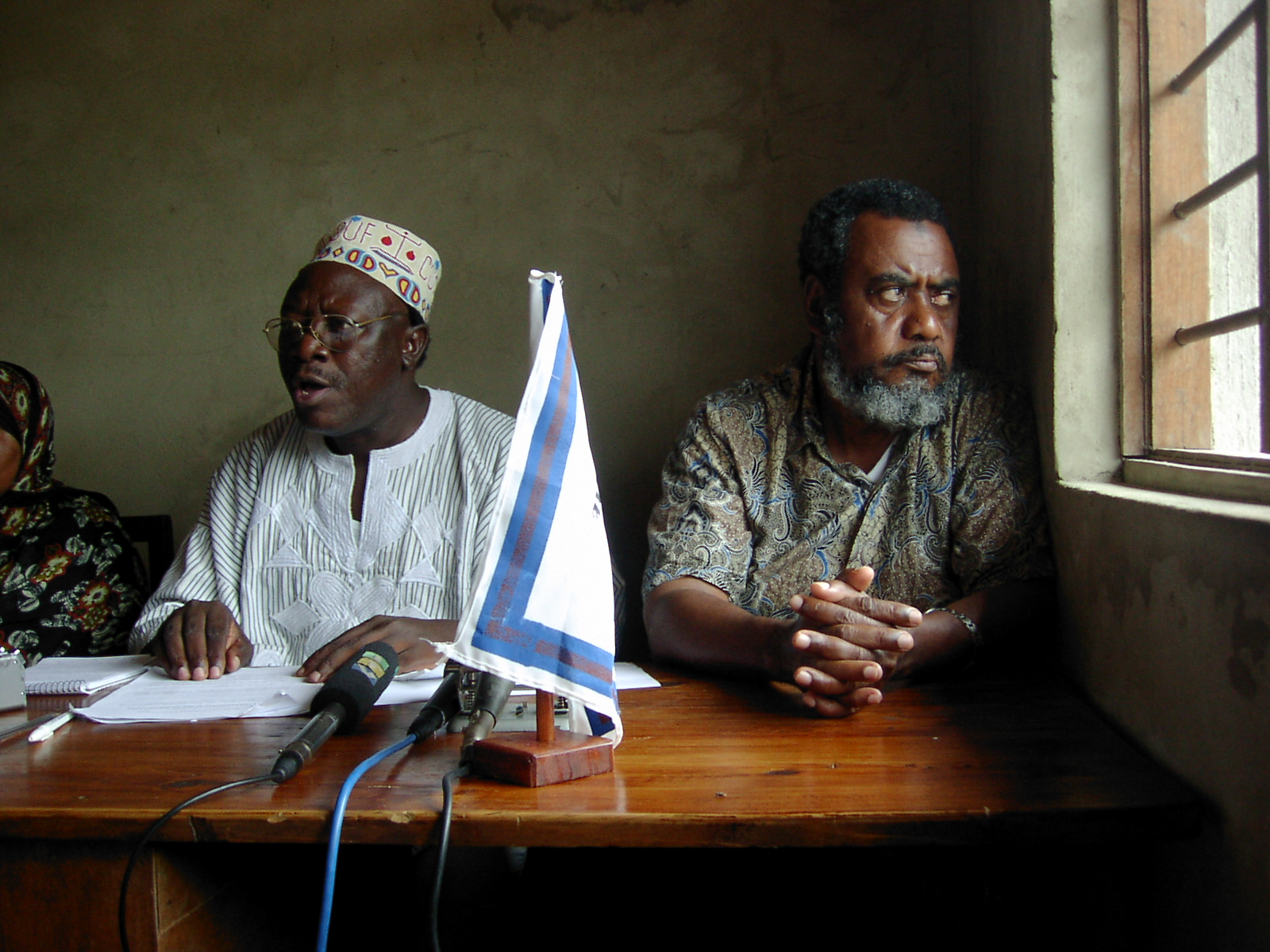
Hamad (r) and Ibrahim Lipumba (left) in a press conference after the victory of CUF in the Pemba by-elections, 2003

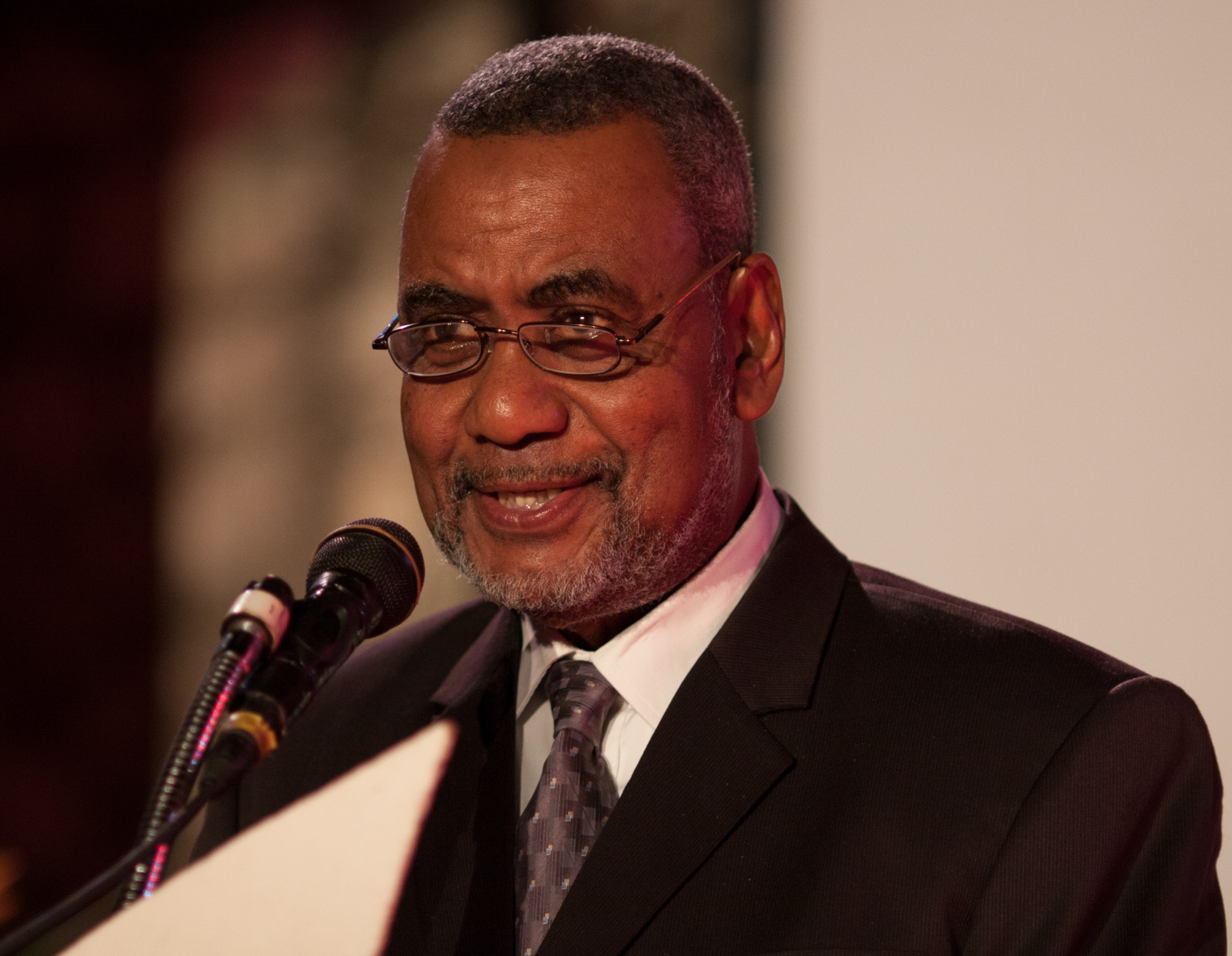
Hamad at the 2013 Zanzibar International Film Festival

Hamad attended Primary School at Uondwe and Wete Boys School, in Pemba 1950–1957. He started his secondary education 1958–1961, at King George VI Memorial Secondary School, in Zanzibar Town, Zanzibar. Hamad went on to attend high school education at the same school 1962–1963.

After completing high school in December 1963, for the next nine years (1964–1972), he was prevented from pursuing university education because he was required to fill in one of the vacancies in the civil service caused by the mass departure of British officials in 1964, after being asked to do so by the new Zanzibar Revolutionary Government. He was posted to teach in secondary schools before attending University of Dar es Salaam in 1972–1975; he graduated with B.A. (Honors) in Political Science, Public Administration and International Relations.

On 31 January 2021, it was announced that he had contracted COVID-19 and was in hospital in Zanzibar.

== Political career ==
Hamad served as a Member of the Zanzibar Revolutionary Council and Zanzibar Minister of Education (1977–1980), founding member of the Zanzibar House of Representatives (1980–1989) and Member of Tanzanian Parliament (1977), Member of the Central Committee and National Executive Committee of Chama cha Mapinduzi (CCM) - Tanzania's Ruling Party (1977–1987), Head of the Economic and Planning Department of the CCM (1982–1987) and Chief Minister of Zanzibar from 6 February 1984 to 22 January 1988. Soon after his dismissal, he was expelled from the sole legal party, Chama Cha Mapinduzi (CCM), after disputes with party officials. From May 1989 - November, 1991 he was imprisoned as a prisoner of conscience.

When Tanzania adopted a multiparty political system in 1992, Hamad along with other former CCM members founded the Civic United Front party. The first multiparty elections took place in 1995 and Hamad was the CUF's candidate for the Presidency of Zanzibar. He was narrowly defeated by CCM candidate Salmin Amour, winning 49.76% of the vote to Amour's 50.24%. Observers noted serious irregularities in the poll and the CUF rejected the result as rigged.

Hamad was again defeated in the 2000 elections by CCM candidate Amani Abeid Karume. He received 32.96% of the vote to Karume's 67.04%. Observers condemned the poll citing widespread irregularities and instances of intimidation of opposition supporters by the security forces. The Commonwealth of Nations team described the election as a 'shambles'.

On 26 and 27 January 2001, more than forty five CUF supporters were gunned down by Tanzanian Security Forces in peaceful demonstration called to protest the imposition of Zanzibar Government against the will of the people. This led to the ruling CCM party and opposition CUF to have a dialogue that resulted in signing MUAFAKA II, a peace accord designed to ensure electoral and constitutional reforms. Most of the planned reforms were not implemented by the government, including, crucially, an agreed credible voters' register prior to the elections of October 2005.

In the 30 October 2005 election, according to official results, Hamad was again defeated by Amani Abeid Karume, winning 46.07% of the vote to Karume's 53.18%. CUF disputed the election and refused to recognise Karume as President.

The union elections in December 2005 followed a similar pattern on Zanzibar with CUF carrying Pemba but not Unguja.

On 31 October 2010, Tanzanians voted to elect President of Tanzania and Zanzibar and Hamad ran for election, alongside Dr Ali Mohamed Shein of the ruling party CCM who was declared the winner on Monday, 1 November 2010, scooping 179,809 votes against 175,338 votes of Hamad.

Dr Shein's victory is equal to 50.1 per cent of all the 364,924 votes cast while Hamad garnered 49.1 per cent. In October 2015 Hamad won the election by 25,000 votes against Incumbent Ali Mohamed Shein but the election commission canceled the election results. Hamad became the first ever Vice President of Zanzibar when Dr. Shein was sworn in as president of Zanzibar. In March 2016, Hamad refused to participate in the rerun of the election which brought Dr Shein to power again illegally.

On 18 March 2019 Hamad resigned from CUF and joined another political Party ACT Wazalendo.

On 8 December 2020, Maalim Seif was sworn in as the First Vice President of Revolutionary Government of Zanzibar for a five year term.

== Political victimisation ==
In January 1988, he was unceremoniously dropped from the Revolutionary Council and removed as the Chief Minister of Zanzibar and in May 1988 he was expelled from the ruling CCM with six colleagues and automatically lost his parliamentary seat in the Zanzibar House of Representatives. In May 1989, he was arrested and taken to court to face (politically motivated) trumped up charges of allegedly being found with government secret documents. From 1989–1991 he was remanded in the Zanzibar Central Prison. In April 2000, he was arrested and charged with trumped up charges of allegedly attacking members of the police and robbing them with a gun (the charges were finally dropped by the Zanzibar Magistrate’s Court in November 2003).

== Death ==
Hamad was hospitalised on 29 January 2021, after his party said he, his wife, and aides had tested positive for COVID-19 during the COVID-19 pandemic in Tanzania. Tanzania's government had not reported any official cases since April 2020, despite reports of deaths being attributed to "acute pneumonia." Hamad died at Muhimbili National Hospital in Dar es Salaam on 17 February 2021. He was 77 years old. After his death, Tanzanian President John Magufuli declared three days of mourning.
