= Amani Abeid Karume =

President of Zanzibar from 2000 to 2010

Amani Karume
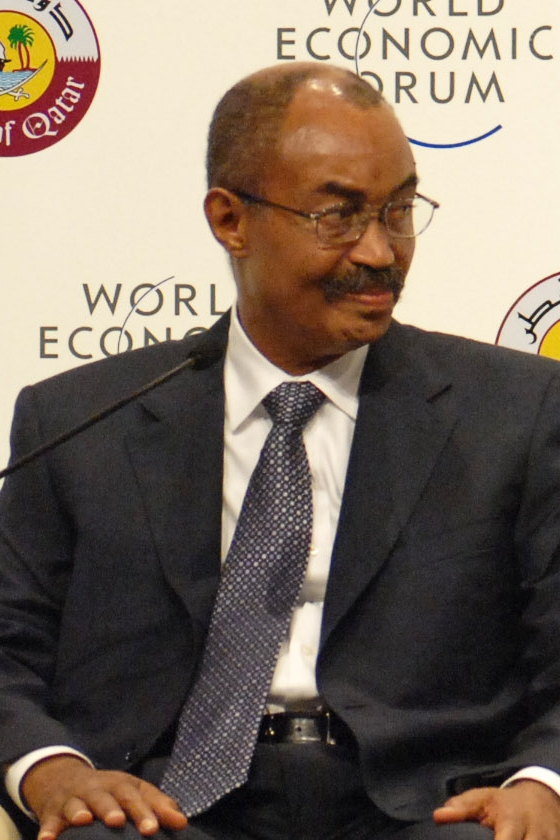
- Karume in 2010

6th President of Zanzibar
- In office 8 November 2000 – 3 November 2010
- Preceded by: Salmin Amour
- Succeeded by: Ali Mohamed Shein

Personal details
- Born: 1 November 1948 (age 77) Zanzibar City, Sultanate of Zanzibar
- Party: CCM
- Spouse: Shadya
- Relations: Abeid Karume (father); Ali Karume (brother)
- Children: 6

Amani Abeid Karume (born 1 November 1948) is a Tanzanian politician and a former president of Zanzibar. He held the office from 8 November 2000 to 3 November 2010. He is the son of Zanzibar's first president, Abeid Karume, and a member of the Chama Cha Mapinduzi (CCM). Currently, he is the Chancellor of Mbeya University of Science and Technology (MUST).

== Early life and career ==
A Muslim born in 1948, Karume was schooled at the Lumumba Secondary School until 1969 when he became an accountant. During the 1970s he held various positions in the Revolutionary Government of Zanzibar including Chief Treasurer (1970–1971), Principal Secretary in the Ministry of Finance (1971–1974), Principal Secretary in the Ministry of Planning (1974–1978), and Principal Secretary in the Ministry of Communications and Transport (1978–1980).

During the 1980s, he worked as a private consultant for a British-based business in Zanzibar. Karume returned to government and politics in 1990 when he was elected to the Zanzibar House of Representatives from the Raha Leo constituency. In 1995, he was re-elected to that position in multiparty polls.

== Political career ==
He entered politics in 1990, running for Raha Leo constituency as a Zanzibar Member of Parliament. He was thereafter nominated as the Minister of Trade from 1990-1995 by President Salmin Amour. In 1995, he was re-elected for the same constituency and thereafter nominated as the Minister of Communication and Transportation.

Karume, running as CCM presidential candidate for Zanzibar, won 67.04% of the vote in an October 2000 election marred by irregularities and criticized by international observers (although polling on mainland Tanzania was generally praised). The controversy that surrounded the elections led to massive demonstrations, particularly in the island of Pemba where police opened fire on demonstrators, killing thirteen people.

He was re-elected in the 30 October 2005 election, winning 53.18% of the vote, in another contested election with many irregularities, according to the Zanzibar Electoral Commission. Karume is married and is the father of six adult children. He is fluent in Swahili and English.

In late 2009, after years of reconciliation efforts between CCM and CUF under the framework of "Muafaka" failing, President Karume initiated peace talks with his counterpart, Seif Sharif Hamad of the Civic United Front (CUF). It was the first time in the history of "democratic politics" of Zanzibar where the two leaders held dialogue to seek a lasting peace solution for the isles. The two leaders provided the opportunity to the Zanzibar people to decide on their future destiny and through a referendum conducted in July 2010, the Zanzibari people voted YES to a government of National Unity. In November 2010, after the first internationally declared peaceful and fair democratic elections, President Amani Karume stepped down, handing over to President Ali Mohamed Shein from the triumphant CCM party.

== Honours and awards ==
University	Country	Degree	Year
Hubert Kairuki Memorial University	Tanzania	Doctor of Science	2010

Party political offices
Preceded by Salmin Amour	National Vice Chairman (Zanzibar) of the Chama Cha Mapinduzi ?–2012	Succeeded by Ali Mohamed Shein
Political offices
Preceded by Salmin Amour	President of Zanzibar; 2000–2010	Succeeded by Ali Mohamed Shein
