= Tanzania Labour Party =

Political party in Tanzania

Tanzania Labour Party Chama cha TLP (Swahili)
- Abbreviation: TLP
- Chairman: Hamad Mkadam Rajab
- Secretary-General: Richard Lyimo
- Founder: Leo Lwekamwa
- Founded: 1992
- Headquarters: Dar es Salaam
- Youth wing: Labour Youth
- Ideology: Social democracy
- Political position: Left-wing
- Colours

The Tanzania Labour Party (TLP) is a political party in Tanzania.

== Electoral performance ==
At the 2000 legislative elections, the party won 3 out of 269 seats in the National Assembly. In the presidential elections of the same day, its candidate Augustine Lyatonga Mrema won 7.8% of the vote.

In elections held on 14 December 2005, TLP presidential candidate Augustine Mrema placed fourth out of ten candidates, winning 0.75% of the vote. The party won one seat in National Assembly elections held on the same day.

== Election results ==
=== Presidential elections ===
Election	Party candidate	Votes	%	Result
2005	Augustine Mrema	84,901	0.75%	Lost ✗
2010	Muttamwega Bhatt Mgaywan	17,482	0.21%	Lost ✗
2015	Machmillan Elifatio Lyimo	8,198	0.05%	Lost ✗
2020	Did not participate			
2025	Rwamugira Mbatina Yustas	17,583	0.05%	Lost ✗
