= African Democratic Alliance Party =

Political party in Tanzania

- Abbreviation: ADA-TADEA
- Chairman: Juma Ali Khatib
- Secretary-General: Saleh Msumari
- Founded: 28 August 1992
- Ideology: Anti-corruption; Economic liberalism Co-operative movement
- National Assembly: 0 / 384
- Zanzibar HoR: 1 / 85

The African Democratic Alliance Party is a political party in Tanzania. The party was registered on 28 August 1992 formerly known as Tanzania Democratic Alliance. It is predominant in semi-autonomous islands of Zanzibar, Tanzania.

John D. Lifa Chipaka was its previous long served president.

== Party structure ==
The African Democratic Alliance Party is split into branches that must have a minimum of 30 people. Each branch takes care of party affairs within the party. Local branches are required to meet at least 6 times each year.

Each branch has an executive committee which includes:

1. Chairperson
2. Vice Chairman
3. Secretary
4. Assistant secretary
5. Treasurer
6. Assistant Treasurer along with 4 other members.

Above the local branch level comes the District Conference, which is made up of 10 members from each local branch. District Conferences must include:

1. All members of the District Executive Committee
2. Ten elected delegates from each branch
3. Branch Chairperson
4. Branch Secretary
5. Branch Treasurer

The duty of the District Executive is to review reports from local branches, to elect the District Executive Committee, to elect 5 members to the Regional Conference, and to elect 3 members to the National Conference. The District Executive is also responsible for the collection of funds, and co-ordination of the activities of local branches within the district, the District Conference must occur a minimum of 6 times a year.

The Regional Conference consists of:

1. All members of the Regional Executive Committee
2. 5 members from each district within the region
3. All District Chairpersons
4. All District Secretaries
5. All District Treasurers

The duty of the Regional Executive is to review reports from the Districts, elect members to the Regional Executive Committee, elect 2 representatives to the National Executive Committee. The Regional Executive must evaluate the performance of the Branches, and report directly to the Party Headquarters in Dar es Salaam. They are required to meet at least 6 times a year.

The National Conference consists of:

1. 3 representatives from each Branch
2. All members of the National Executive Committee
3. All Regional Treasurers

The work of the National Executive Committee is to review the party's work over the past year, further the aims of the party, to amend the Constitution and rules of the party, and to deal with all matters relating to discipline within the party.

The National Executive Committee elects:

1. The Party President
2. 2 Vice Presidents
3. The Secretary general
4. The Organising and Publicity Secretary
5. 2 Deputy Secretaries general
6. 2 Deputy Treasurers general
7. 2 Deputy Organising and Publicity Secretaries

The National Executive Committee convenes every 3 months, and reports to the Central Committee, which includes all the people listed above along with all Regional Chairs, and 28 other elected members.

The Central Committee meets every month, they examine the parties progress and recommend measures to successfully implement the party programme. They supervise day to day activities, and set the agenda for the National Conference.

== Election results ==
=== Presidential elections ===
Election	Party candidate	Votes	%	Result
2025	Bussungu Georges Gabriel	14,377	0.04%	Lost ✗
