= Ali Mohamed Shein =

President of Zanzibar from 2010 to 2020

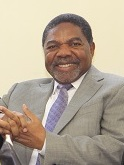

7th President of Zanzibar
- In office 3 November 2010 – 3 November 2020
- Vice Presidents: Seif Sharif Hamad (First); Seif Ali lddi (Second)
- Preceded by: Amani Abeid Karume
- Succeeded by: Hussein Mwinyi

8th Vice President of Tanzania
- In office 13 July 2001 – 3 November 2010
- President: Benjamin Mkapa; Jakaya Kikwete
- Preceded by: Omar Ali Juma
- Succeeded by: Mohamed Gharib Bilal

Personal details
- Born: 13 March 1948 (age 78) Chokocho, Pemba, Zanzibar
- Party: CCM
- Spouse: Mwanamwema Shein
- Education: Lumumba Secondary School
- Alma mater: Odesa University (MSc); Newcastle University Medical School (PhD)
- Profession: Medical doctor
- Website: www.ikuluzanzibar.go.tz

Ali Mohamed Shein (born 13 March 1948) was the 7th President of Zanzibar, from 2010 to 2020. He was previously Vice President of Tanzania from 2001 to 2010. Shein is originally from the island of Pemba, and he is a member of the ruling Chama Cha Mapinduzi (CCM) party. He is a medical doctor by profession.

== Political career ==
Shein was appointed by the President of Zanzibar to be a Member of the House of Representatives on 29 October 1995. He was then appointed Deputy Minister of Health on 12 November 1995. From 6 November 2000, he was a Member of the House of Representatives at Mkanyageni Constituency in Zanzibar before being appointed to be a Minister of State, President's Office, Constitution, and Good Governance in Zanzibar on 22 November 2000, and Vice President of Tanzania in July 2001.

Shein has been nominated by the ruling party CCM on 9 July 2010 as a presidential candidate for CCM in Zanzibar. Shein got 117 votes while Bilali and Shamsi Vuai Nahodha got 54 and 33 respectively and was elected the new president of Zanzibar and is the only one born on Pemba Island, winning with a vote share of 50.1% on 31 October 2010.

== Honours and awards ==
Honorary degrees

- College of Pathologists of East, Central and Southern Africa (COPECSA), September 2014

Party political offices
Preceded by Amani Karume	National Vice Chairman (Zanzibar) of the Chama Cha Mapinduzi; 2012–2020	Succeeded by Hussein Mwiyni
Political offices
Preceded by Amani Karume	President of Zanzibar; 2010–2020	Succeeded by Hussein Mwiyni
Preceded by Omar Ali Juma	Vice President of Tanzania; 2001–2010	Succeeded by Mohamed Gharib Bilal
