= Zanzibar House of Representatives =

Unicameral legislature of Zanzibar

Zanzibar House of Representatives Baraza la Wawakilishi (Swahili)

Type
- Type: Unicameral

History
- Founded: 14 January 1980
- New session started: October 2020

Leadership
- Speaker: Zubeir Ali Maulid
- Deputy Speaker: Mgeni Hassan Juma

Structure
- Seats: 75
- Political groups: Government (68): CCM (68); Opposition (5): ACT (4); TADEA (1); Other (2): Attorney General and Speaker (2)
- Length of term: 5 years

Elections
- Voting system: First-past-the-post
- First election: 26 October 1980
- Last election: 28 October 2020

Meeting place
- Unguja, Zanzibar, Tanzania

Website
- zanzibarassembly.go.tz/en

The Zanzibar House of Representatives (Swahili: Baraza la Wawakilishi wa Zanzibar) is the unicameral, subnational legislature of the autonomous islands of Zanzibar in Tanzania.

== History ==
The current legislature was formed in 1980. Prior to this, the Revolutionary Council held both the executive and legislative functions for 16 years following the Zanzibar Revolution in 1964.

== Current composition ==
Type of Representatives since 2020	CCM	ACT-W	TADEA	Total
Elected in constituencies	46	4	0	50
Nominated by the President of Zanzibar	4	2	1	7
Special seats reserved for women	18	0	0	18
Speaker	1	-	-	1
Attorney General (Ex officio member)	-	-	-	-
Total	69	6	1	76

ACT-Wazalendo achieved more than 10% of the vote and thus was included into the Government of National Unity according to the Zanzibar constitution. After a split in the so far strong CUF opposition party, most members and votes had shifted to ACT-W.

== Composition after the 2016 election ==
The legislature formed in 2016 after the 2016 Zanzibari general elections consisted of 88 members. This election had been a repeat of the annulled 2015 election and was boycotted by the opposition.

Type	CCM	Other	Total
Elected from constituencies	54	0	54
Nominated by the President of Zanzibar	7	3	10
Special seats reserved for women (40%)	22	0	22
Speaker (if not from the MPs)	1	–	1
Attorney General (Ex officio member)	–	–	1
Total	84	3	88

== Past election results ==
The results of the past elections held under the multiparty system are as follows:

Political Party	Election Year						
Political Party	1995	2000	2005	2010	2015	2016	2020
Chama Cha Mapinduzi (CCM)	26	34	30	28		84	68
Civic United Front (CUF)	24	16	19	22			
Total	50	50	50	50	(Annulled)	88	75

The 2010 Zanzibari general election saw an almost equal division of votes between the two leading parties. The 2015 election was annulled by the election commission, leading to protests from the CUF opposition and their boycott of the 2016 election in which the CCM won every elected seat.

== See also ==
- National Assembly (Tanzania)
