= Bessie Sudlow =

English singer and burlesque entertainer

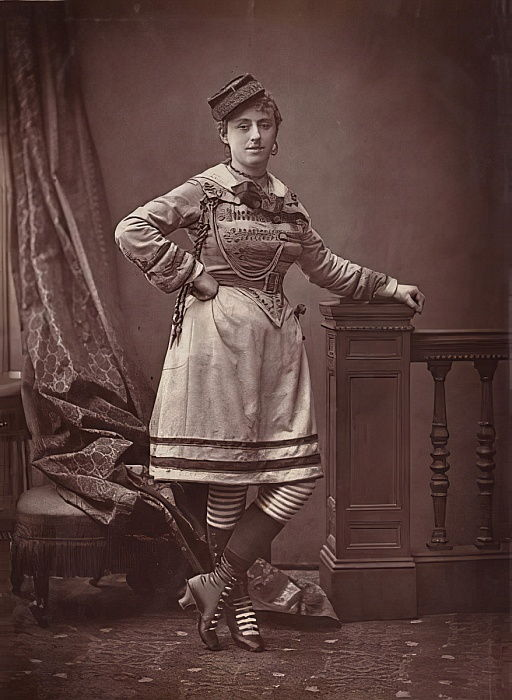
- Bessie Sudlow c. 1873
- Born: Barbara Eliza Johnstone; 22 July 1849; Liverpool, England
- Died: 28 January 1928 (aged 78); Steyning, Sussex, England 28 Jan 1928]
- Occupations: Burlesque performer, opera bouffe soprano

Bessie Sudlow (born Barbara Eliza (Bessie) Johnstone; 22 July 1849 – 28 January 1928) was a British singer and entertainer who performed in the United States in Victorian burlesque from 1867 to 1874, then in Britain as an opera bouffe soprano. She married theatre manager Michael Gunn in 1876 and performed only once more before retiring.

== Life ==
=== Early years ===
Barbara Eliza (Bessie) Johnstone was born at 9 Bittern St in Liverpool, England, on 22 July 1849. Her mother was Eliza, née Lee, from Ireland, and her father was George Johnstone, a qualified Master Mariner in the merchant navy. He died before the 1851 census. Eliza married Thomas Sudlow, also from Liverpool, in 1851 shortly after they moved to the United States, taking Bessie with them. Bessie's stepfather, Thomas, was the stage-doorkeeper at Niblo's Garden in New York. She joined a burlesque troupe, the "British Blondes" with the stage name Bessie Sudlow. The troupe was led by Lydia Thompson, an English dancer, comedian, actress and producer.

=== Burlesque in the United States ===
The Evening Telegraph of Philadelphia, Pennsylvania, on 17 November 1868 noted with approval in its review of The Lancashire Lass that "Miss Bessie Sudlow, who sustains the part of 'Fanny Danville' at the Chesnut, no longer affects a 'Grecian bend'." The "British Blondes" performed at the Tammany Grand Theatre in 1868–1869. Sudlow performed in January 1869 in New York in the burlesque The Page's Revel. At the age of 20, in 1869, Sudlow appeared in The Forty Thieves at Niblo's. In April and May 1869 she appeared there in Robinson Crusoe and His Man Friday!. A review in The New York Times said that the pantomime-burlesque was "wrought out of tolerably old material ... [it] will be witnessed with greater pleasure when repeated rehearsals shall have smoothened it."

In December 1869 and January 1870 Sudlow played at the Tammany Grand Theatre in a burlesque of Richard III called Bad Dickey. A review in the New York Clipper on 15 October 1870 said, "Miss Bessie Sudlow, serio-comic vocalist, has won golden opinions. Her rendition of Sweet Spirit Hear My Prayer and By Killarney’s Lakes and Vales is truly excellent." Sudlow appeared on a regular basis from 1871 to 1873 in various extravaganzas at Niblo's, including two revivals of The Black Crook. She kept her connection to Thompson's troupe until she returned to England, but also performed in other productions.

=== Opera bouffe in Britain ===
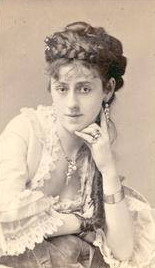
Bessie Sudlow in 1870

Sudlow returned to England and in September 1874 played with Thompson’s company in Blue Beard, a burlesque by Henry Brougham Farnie, at the Charing Cross Theatre in London. In January 1875 she performed at the Theatre Royal, Dublin in The Yellow Dwarf, a pantomime. The Era described her as "a very graceful and attractive actress and sings pleasingly". She appeared at the Gaiety Theatre, Dublin in March 1875 in The Isle of Bachelors, adapted from Charles Lecocq’s comic opera Les cent vierges. In June 1875 she performed in a promenade concert at the Theatre Royal, Dublin in honour of the American team taking part in an Irish–American International Rifle Match.

Sudlow was in a company organized by Richard D'Oyly Carte that started a tour of England and Ireland on 21 June 1875. Carte's company performed Offenbach's La Périchole and La fille de Madame Angot, and Trial by Jury by Gilbert and Sullivan. After ten weeks in England, the company opened at the Gaiety Theatre, Dublin, on 5 September 1875. In October 1875 Sudlow performed in another opera bouffe soprano role, Cesarine, in Charles Lecocq's Fleur-de-Thé at the Criterion Theatre.. Emily Soldene recalled in her 1898 memoirs that the actress playing Caesarine had to be replaced at the last minute, and Carte wired the Gaiety Theatre, Dublin's manager, Michael Gunn, to send Sudlow from Dublin. She heard the music for the first time with an orchestra when she was on stage, and had to improvise where she had forgotten the words, but the reviewers were enthusiastic.

In January 1876, she performed at the Theatre Royal, Dublin in Dick Whittington and His Cat. According to The Era, "Her acting was as fresh as a daisy, and her sparkling vivacity and pleasant manner again won showers of applause and golden opinions". In March 1876 Sudlow again went on tour with D'Oyly Carte's London Comic Opera Company, which again included La fille de Madame Angot in its repertoire. During rehearsals in Manchester, the two leading ladies, Pattie Laverne and Selina Dolaro, argued about the tempo of a duet. Eventually, Dolaro refused to play, and Carte called on Sudlow to learn the role of Lange and play it at short notice. Sudlow was known for her ability to learn a role quickly. She was principal soprano for Carte's Opera Bouffe Company on tour from June to August 1876 playing the Plaintiff in Trial by Jury, Amanda in Carte's Happy Hampstead, Müller in The Duke's Daughter, and Lange in La fille de Madame Angot.

=== Later years ===
When she was playing in the Gaiety Theatre, Dublin in September 1875, the manager, Gunn, became attracted to Sudlow. (Note: Sudlow may have met Michael Gunn before September 1875, since she had been in Dublin from January to June 1875 and had performed at the Royal and the Gaiety, both owned by Gunn and his brother.) Gunn was a silent partner of Carte's for several years. Carte was Michael Gunn's best man when he married Sudlow on 26 October 1876 at the St Marylebone Parish Church, London. The bride was given away by George Dolby. (Note: George Dolby, born in 1831, a theatre manager and a close friend and manager of Charles Dickens. He died in 1900 in a paupers' hospital, the Fulham Parish Infirmary.) After that, Sudlow only performed on stage once more. They had six children, including Kevin (born in 1880), Brendan (born in 1881), Haidée Elizabeth (born 2 July 1882), Selskar (born in 1883), and Agnes. Haidée and Agnes both became actresses. Agnes later became later Lady Webb as wife of Sir Ambrose Henry Webb. Selskar became prominent as an expert in public health.

Gunn and Sudlow had fine houses in Merrion Square, Dublin, and on Russell Square, London. They were one of the richest families in Dublin and often held large gatherings at their house. Gunn was a close friend of John Stanislaus Joyce, father of James Joyce. The Joyces often visited the Gunns, and James Joyce became a friend of their son Selskar. After Gunn died in 1901, Sudlow became owner of the Gaiety and held it until 1909.

Bessie Sudlow Gunn died in Steyning, Sussex, on 28 January 1928.

== Sources ==
- Ainger, Michael (21 November 2002), Gilbert and Sullivan: A Dual Biography, Oxford University Press, USA, ISBN 978-0-19-514769-8
- Davenport, Bob (15 March 2016), Michael and Bessie Gunn: Theatre people
- "Death of Mr. Michael Gunn", Advocate, Melbourne, Australia
- Ganzl, Kurt (18 March 2014), Lydia Thompson: Queen of Burlesque, Taylor & Francis, ISBN 978-1-135-35803-7
- Goldthorpe, Liz (20 April 2020), Sir (Ambrose) Henry Webb, National Portrait Gallery
- Harty, John III (22 December 2015), James Joyce's Finnegans Wake: A Casebook, Routledge, ISBN 978-1-317-27351-6
- Litsios, Socrates, "A Theatrical Heritage", The Public Health Life and Times of Selskar Gunn
- "Musical and Drama", The Evening Telegraph, Philadelphia, Pennsylvania, 17 November 1868
- "Review", New York Times, 27 April 1869 – via Music in Gotham
- Seeley, Paul (2 January 2019), Richard D'Oyly Carte, Taylor & Francis, ISBN 978-1-351-04589-6
- "Selskar Michael Gunn", American Journal of Public Health, 34 (10), American Public Health Association: 1096–1097, October 1944, doi:10.2105/AJPH.34.10.1096, PMC 1625293, PMID 18016067
- Simkin, John (September 1997), George Dolby, Spartacus Educational Publishers
- Socrates Litsios, "A Theatrical Heritage", The Public Health Life and Times of Selskar Gunn
- Soldene, Emily (1898), My Theatrical and Musical Recollections (PDF), London: Downey & Co
- Stone, David (2002), "Bessie Sudlow (1876)", Who Was Who in the D'Oyly Carte Opera Company
- ""Theatrical Record"", New York Clipper, 15 October 1870
- "The Isle of Bachelors", Freeman's Journal, Dublin, 27 February 1875
- "The Yellow Dwarf", The Era, 17 January 1875
