= Moses Beckelman =

American social worker (1906–1955)

- Born: 1906; New York, New York, U.S.
- Died: December 12, 1955 (aged 48–49); New York, New York, U.S.
- Education: College of the City of New York
- Occupation: Director-general
- Years active: 1939-1954
- Employers: American Jewish Joint Distribution Committee (1939-1941, 1946-1951); U.S. Office of Strategic Services
- Organizations: Metropolitan Association of Jewish Centers; National Conference of Jewish Social Welfare; International Conference of Social work; Office of Foreign Relief and Rehabilitation Operations; UNRRA

Moses W. Beckelman (1906–December 12, 1955) was a social worker from New York City. He began his career with the American Jewish Joint Distribution Committee (JDC or Joint) in 1939, becoming its director-general in 1951.

Born in New York, Beckelman graduated from the College of the City of New York in 1928. He further took graduate classes at Columbia University, the School for Jewish Social Work and the New York School of Social Work. He joined JDC in 1939 and was sent to Vilna in October 1939, where he faced a refugee crisis in the aftermath of the Invasion of Poland. With his colleague Yitzhak Gitterman, Beckelman arranged to feed, house, and clothe thousands of people, as well as provide care for children and the elderly, sponsor cultural activities, and offer vocational training.

At the end of 1939, Beckelman and Gitterman set out for Stockholm on an Estonian passenger ship. Beckelman planned to send uncensored reports to the home office in New York and then return to Vilna; Gitterman hoped to flee Europe. The Germans seized the ship, and both men were arrested. Gitterman was sent back to Poland, where he continued to work for the JDC and perished during a Warsaw ghetto action in January 1943.

Beckelman was able to return to Lithuania and continued to support the refugees. He left Lithuania in February 1941 and was posted to South America in 1941–42. He then joined the U.S. Office of Strategic Services, State Department's Office of Foreign Relief and Rehabilitation Operations, and UNRRA. In February 1945, he became assistant to Herbert William Emerson, director of the Intergovernmental Committee on Refugees. He re-joined JDC in 1946 as second-in-command of the European programs and was elected as director-general of JDC in 1951.

Beckelman died in 1955 of a heart attack. He was 49.
