= Selskar Gunn =

Public health administrator (1883–1944)

- Born: Selskar Michael Gunn; 25 May 1883; London, England
- Died: 2 August 1944 (aged 61)
- Occupation: Public health expert
- Known for: Vice-president of the Rockefeller Foundation

Selskar Michael Gunn (25 May 1883 – 2 August 1944) was a public health expert who was a vice-president of the Rockefeller Foundation for many years. He is known for the foundation's innovative program in China that combined improvements to agriculture, education and medicine in rural areas.

== Early years (1883–1917) ==
Gunn's father was Michael Gunn (1840–1901), who had managed the Opera Bouffe Company tour for Richard D'Oyly Carte, and was the manager of the Gaiety Theatre, Dublin. His mother was Barbara Elizabeth Johnstone, who performed in burlesque and opéra bouffe under the stage name Bessie Sudlow. Selskar Michael Gunn was born in London, England on 25 May 1883. In 1900 Gunn went to the United States to study at the Massachusetts Institute of Technology (MIT). He was a pupil of William Thompson Sedgwick at MIT. He graduated with a Bachelor of Science degree in 1905, as a bacteriologist. In 1906 he became an American citizen.

Gunn worked in various public health positions before joining the Rockefeller Foundation as an officer. From 1908 to 1910 he was Health Officer of Orange, New Jersey. From 1910 to 1919 he was a teacher at MIT under Sedgwick and became an associate professor. He was secretary of the American Public Health Association from 1912 to 1918, managing editor of the American Journal of Public Health from 1912 to 1914, and editor of that journal from 1914 to 1918. From 1914 to 1916 he worked for the Massachusetts Department of Public Health. He helped design the Massachusetts Division of Hygiene, becoming a director of that institution. In 1917 he was Certified in Public Health (CPH) at the Harvard-Technology School for Health Officers.

== Europe (1917–1931) ==
From 1917 to 1920 Gunn was a captain in the Red Cross. In 1917 Gunn was appointed associate director of the Commission for Prevention of Tuberculosis in France. In France he was engaged in public education and training French medical workers. In 1920 he transferred to Czechoslovakia, where he acted as an advisor to the public health administration. In 1922 he returned to the Rockefeller Foundation's Paris office to become director of divisional operations for Europe.

In Europe Gunn met and was strongly influenced by Andrija Štampar of Yugoslavia, whose ideas about social medicine stressed the importance to health of agriculture and education. Gunn worked with Štampar to develop an innovative program that would combine education, economics, sociology, engineering and agriculture to consider all the needs of rural communities. The program was rejected for political reasons, but Gunn continued to believe in the approach. At one point Gunn intervened with the King of Yugoslavia to prevent Štampar from being ousted by a political intrigue. He continued with the International Health Division until 1927, when he was appointed vice president of European operations and assistant director of social science programs in Europe.

== China (1931–1937) ==
Gunn visited China in the summer of 1931 and toured a number of institutions, including the demonstration center at Dingxian organized by Jimmy Yen. He started to see China as the perfect place to prove his and Štampar's concepts. In 1932 Gunn was elected vice president of the Rockefeller Foundation. He made more trips to China and was a moving force in getting the foundation to fund the China Program. In 1933 Gunn married the actress Carroll McComas. After some resistance, Gunn's program for China was approved, with $1,000,000 for a three year trial starting in July 1935.

The aim of the multidisciplinary program was to improve the educational, social, and economic standards of the people of rural China. Some saw it as an alternative approach to public health compared to that of the International Health Division. The foundation provided officers who worked with local institutions to train local people as professionals in sanitation, agriculture and medicine. Gunn worked closely with John Black Grant of the Peking Union Medical College. The two men brought together leaders from Nankai University, Yenching University, the National Agricultural Research Bureau, Jimmy Yen’s Mass Education Movement, and Peking Union Medical University into the North China Council for Rural Reconstruction. The China program was curtailed when the Japanese invaded China in 1937.

== Last years (1937–1944) ==
Gunn returned to Paris in 1938, but had to return to New York in 1940 after the Germans invaded France. From 1941 Gunn and his assistant Philip Skinner Platt worked on a study of the role of voluntary health agencies in the United States for the National Health Council. In 1943 he was secretary of New York governor Herbert H. Lehman's committee to organize the Office of Foreign Relief and Rehabilitation Operations (OFRRO), creating plans that were used in the operations of its successor, the United Nations Relief and Rehabilitation Administration (UNRRA). Selskar Gunn was decorated by the governments of Czechoslovakia, Denmark, France, Norway, Poland, and Yugoslavia. He died on 2 August 1944.

== Publications ==
- Selskar Michael Gunn (1911), An investigation of housing conditions in Salem Mass
- Selskar M. Gunn, secretary of the Committee (1915), The present condition of public health organization in the United States : being a report of the Central Committee on Public Health Organization based on a voluntary survey of organizations interested in public health
- Selskar Michael Gunn (1934), China and the Rockefeller Foundation
- Selskar M Gunn (1937), The Doings of Dinkie (A children's tale), Illustrated by Vera Bock
- Selskar Michael Gunn (1945), Voluntary health agencies, an interpretive study, with Philip Skinner Platt

== Sources ==
- Litsios, S. (2005), "Selskar Gunn and China: The Rockefeller Foundation's "other" approach to public health", Bull Hist Med, 79 (2): 295–318, doi:10.1353/bhm.2005.0075, PMID 15965290
- Selskar M. Gunn biography, The Rockefeller Archive Center
- Selskar Gunn and the Rural Reconstruction Project in Northern China, China Medical Board
- "Selskar Michael Gunn", American Journal of Public Health, 34 (10), American Public Health Association: 1096–1097, October 1944, doi:10.2105/AJPH.34.10.1096, PMC 1625293, PMID 18016067
- Socrates Litsios, "A Theatrical Heritage", The Public Health Life and Times of Selskar Gunn
