= Mary Frances Scott-Siddons =

British actress, dramatic reader

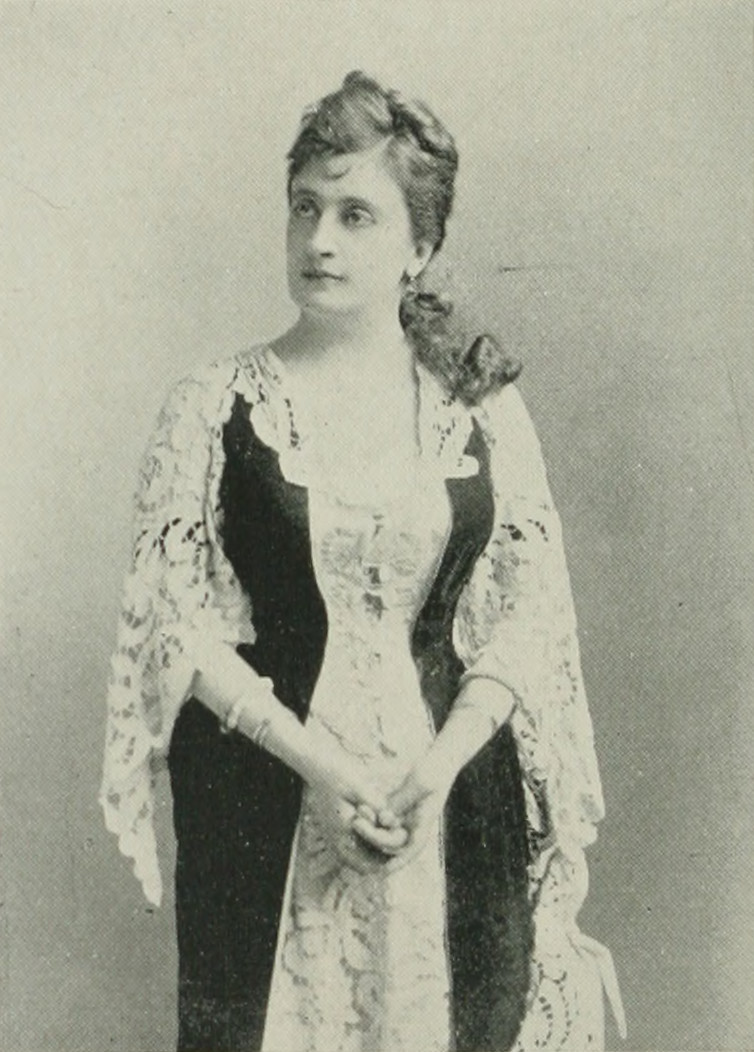
Mary Frances Scott-Siddons, "A woman of the century"

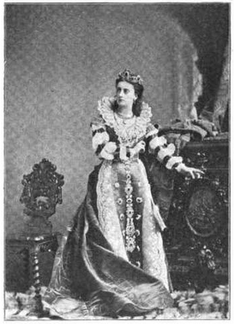
Mary Frances Scott-Siddons

Mary Frances Scott-Siddons (1844 – 8 November 1896), frequently referred to as Mrs. Scott-Siddons, was a British actress and dramatic reader. Her paternal great-grandmother was Sarah Siddons.

After a struggle, Scott-Siddons secured an engagement and made her professional debut at Nottingham, in 1866 as Portia in The Merchant of Venice. She was well received there and in Edinburgh, and in the following year, attained a great success as a Shakespearean reader in London, where in 1867 she played the part of Rosalind in As You Like It at the Theatre Royal Haymarket, and afterward appeared as Juliet, drawing immense audiences. Her beauty and grace of person contributed more to her success than her histrionic talent, and though a spirited and thoroughly natural actress, she lacked the technical training and necessary vigor. In her readings she was more successful.

She appeared in New York City in 1868, where one source states she "played successfully in a long line of characters. while others are critical of this and her subsequent appearances in London. In 1872, she starred in the United States and Australia with one report describing her "mediocre success."

It was as a dramatic reader that Scott-Siddons achieved her greatest fame. Her work was characterized by vast intelligence and clearness of interpretation. Her utterance was rapid, and in a clear, musical voice of great flexibility of expression. In scenes, she made little attempt to differentiate characters by vocal changes; she gestured little.

== Early years and education ==
Mary Frances Siddons was born in Bengal Presidency, British India in 1844. Her father was Capt. William Young Siddons, of the 65th Bengal Light Infantry. Her mother, Susan Mary Earle, was a daughter of Col. Earle, of the British army. Her paternal great-grandmother was Sarah Siddons.

Upon the death of her father, her mother returned to England with her children, settling in Somersetshire, from whence she proceeded to Germany, her two daughters being educated in Bonn. It was here that she made her stage-debut in a German comedy, when she distinguished herself by her elocutionary ability. At the age of eleven years, she astonished her teachers and friends by her striking performance of a part in a French play, Esther. She became fascinated with the stage and was constantly acting in French and German plays, playing the most difficult roles in the dramas of Schiller, Racine, Molière and Corneille. Her performance of the young Mortimer in Friedrich Schiller's Mary Stuart exhibited so much ability as to induce one of the principals of her school to consult with Charles Kean as to the desirability of educating her for the stage. He, however, advised on account of her extreme youth that this be deferred for a few years.

== History and career ==
In 1862, at Hythe, Kent, at the age of eighteen, she married Thomas Scott-Chanter, son of Thomas Barnard Chanter and Isabella Scott. Scott-Chanter had entered the Royal Navy in 1852; served as Assistant Paymaster in 1856 and Paymaster in 1864. At marriage, he took the surname of Scott-Siddons, owing to the objection of the groom's father to the use of the family name on the stage.

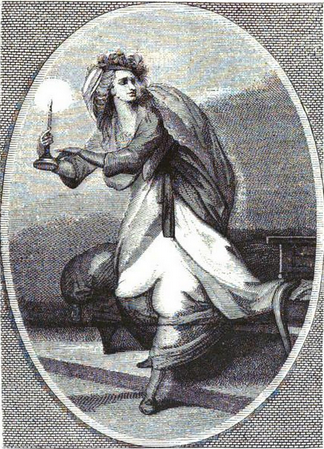
Mary Frances Scott-Siddons as "Lady Macbeth" (from an old wood cut.)

In 1865, using the stage name Mary Frances Scott-Siddons, and, against the wishes of her family, she joined the company of the Theatre Royal, Nottingham. She made her debut as Portia in The Merchant of Venice alongside Walter Montgomery as Shylock and Madge Robertson as Nerissa.

In 1866, she appeared as Juliet in Romeo and Juliet, in Edinburgh, Scotland. Also in 1866, in Nottingham, England, she played the role of Lady Macbeth. This seems to have been an error in judgment, for her physique was not suited to the part, nor had she the necessary stage training for the performance of so difficult a role.

In January 1867, she appeared at the Concert room, Imperial Hotel, Cork, where she read selections from Shakespeare, Tennyson and Scott. On 1 April 1867, she made her first appearance in London in the Hanover Square Rooms, where she again read selections from Shakespeare and Tennyson. These proved so popular that she was early sought after by theatrical managers. On 8 April, she played Rosalind in As you like it at the Theatre Royal Haymarket for the first of eight nights. Critics praised her highly. Her later performances included Juliet, and as Katherine in The Taming of the Shrew.

Her husband retired from the Royal Navy in 1868. He accompanied her when she made her American debut as a reader at Newport, Rhode Island, during the summer of 1868. She first appeared in New York City as a reader from Shakespeare on October 26, 1868, at Steinway Hall. Her first American appearance as an actress was at the Boston Museum, and her metropolitan debut on the dramatic stage occurred November 30, 1868, at the New York Theatre, as Rosalind. Her theatrical debut in that city was made in the Fifth Avenue Theatre, with one report saying she was "coldly received." while another states that she "played successfully in a long line of characters." During this engagement she appeared also in Romeo and Juliet, The Taming of the Shrew, and King René's Daughter. In the December Scott-Siddons continued an engagement at the New York Theatre in "As You Like It", "Romeo and Juliet", and "The School for Scandal". On her return to England her early appearances included one with gentlemen amateurs at the Theatre Royal, Exeter. Leaving Liverpool in September for America, she had an engagement at the Fifth Avenue Theatre in November 1869, including appearing as Beatrice in "Much Ado" and "As you like it".

In July, 1870, she played Pauline in The Lady of Lyons at the Haymarket Theatre following with other impersonations before travelling to America. In September she starred in Tom Taylor's new drama "Twixt Axe and Crown" at the theatre attached to Wood's Museum, New York. On 28 October Scott-Siddons appeared as Juliet in "Romeo and Juliet" at the Music Hall, New Haven, Connecticut.

In November 1871 at the opening of John and Michael Gunn's Gaiety Theatre, Dublin she delivered the prologue by John Francis Wall. On 4 May 1872, at the Queen's Theatre in London was the occasion, "in the first original piece in which she had ever acted," viz. Ordeal by Touch (Richard Lee); she played the part of Coralie. The piece was not a satisfactory success. Following the last-mentioned date, Scott-Siddons was engaged on a "starring" tour in the United States and Australia in 1872, with some sources critical of her performance In July 1873 she gave a recital before Princess Louise, Duchess of Argyle at Grosvenor House. In September 1873 her starring role in "Romeo and Juliet" was not as well received as her Rosalind in "As you like it" both performed at the Theatre-Royal, Edinburgh. Scott-Siddons accompanied by "Seraphael" the well-known pianist Harry Walker arrived in New York in November 1873. Mrs. Scott-Siddons and her protege "Seraphael" (Master Harry Walker) performed at Fulton Hall, Lancaster City, Pennsylvania on Monday, December 7, 1874. "She was followed by "Seraphael," a fair-haired, blue-eyed, sunny-faced Scotch boy, dressed in splendid crimson velvet suit. Scott-Siddons and her husband returned to Liverpool, from a tour in the United States, in April 1875. She toured Australia and New Zealand in 1877. On 21 June 1879, she reappeared on the London stage at the Olympic Theatre for the benefit of George Coleman, and recited two lyrical pieces.

In September 1881, she assumed in London the management of the Haymarket Theatre for a short season. The first production was Walter S. Raleigh's "Queen and Cardinal" In the next production "King Rene's Daughter" the character of Iolanthe, the blind girl, whose sight is restored during the action of the play, had been a favourite with Mrs Scott-Siddons both in America and in this country. By December she had taken the company to the Gaiety Theatre putting on "Romeo and Juliet' and "As you like it"

Scott-Siddons gave a final recitation at St. George's Hall, Belfast prior to leaving for America. On 23 April 1888, she made her appearance as a reader at Steinway Hall, New York, accompanied by her adopted son, the child prodigy, Henry Waller, formerly known as "Seraphael". In 1889 she gave a recital in the Association Hall, Toronto.

While Mrs. Scott-Siddons lived to act, her husband was devoted to alcohol. This caused their separation, and eventually his death in Australia in 1903. After 1891 she lived in semi-retirement. A DRAMATIC recital was given by Scott-Siddons before the Emperor and Empress at Berlin, including the sleep walking scene from - Macbeth," a sketch "Western Life in America," and other pieces.

She died at Neuilly-sur-Seine, Paris, France, on November 19, 1896, and was buried at Brookwood Cemetery, in Brookwood, Surrey, England.

== Reception ==
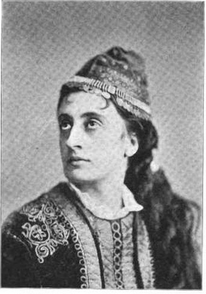
Mary Frances Scott-Siddons as "Rosalind"

Her 8 April 1867 performance as Rosalind was thus noticed in the Daily Telegraph (April 10, 1867):—

"The favourable opinion of the histrionic qualifications of Mrs. ScottSiddons formed by the distinguished auditory who listened last week with so much satisfaction to that lady's Shakespearian readings at the Hanover Square Rooms, was on Monday evening fully confirmed by a fashionable and crowded audience, assembled to witness her dibut on the metropolitan stage as Rosalind A lady who can boast of a direct descent from the most illustrious of our actresses, comes accredited with the strongest recommendation to all who hold in reverence the names which adorn our Thespian annals; but Mrs. Scott-Siddons has a fair claim to theatrical distinction apart from hereditary honours. Well-trained in the business of the stage through a course of provincial practice, there is nothing in the dibutante which betrays the inexperience of the novice. Possessed of a fine expressive face, which may be called classical in its profile, and endowed with the advantages of a neat symmetrical figure, Mrs. Scott-Siddons effectively supplies the external requisites for this most fascinating of Shakespeare's heroines. Her delivery of the text, on which she has manifestly bestowed much thoughtful study, is characterized by earnestness and intelligence, and her action is appropriate and unrestrained. Judging by the enthusiastic plaudits so frequently bestowed through the evening, her performance would seem to have exceeded the most sanguine expectations her friends had entertained; but the good sense of the actress may be safely trusted to discriminate between the liberal applause which is intended to encourage a young aspirant, and a fervent spontaneous acknowledgment of a great triumph fairly won in the world of art. It is when Rosalind dons the doublet and hose that Mrs. Scott-Siddons gives her impulses full play; and the bantering of Orlando in the forest and the vivacious raillery of the imitative wooing were as effective as could be desired. That the young actress who has been received with so warm a welcome is deservedly entitled to the highest position on the metropolitan boards, it would be too much to affirm; but Mrs. Scott-Siddons is unquestionably a valuable acquisition to any theatre in which comedy is performed, and there may be latent powers which only need time and opportunity to favourably develop."

Further, he Daily News (April 9, 1867) expressed the opinion that:—

"Mrs. Scott-Siddons's neat figure, pretty face, and pleasing arch delivery, qualified her for light comedy, and her ease, confidence, and freedom of gesture showed that she had an aptitude for acting. Her reading of Rosalind was saucy and attractive. She lacked the grand air of the tragddienne, which is not always an agreeable air, and many persons, missing this, will vote her unequal to the embodiment of Shakespeare's lighter heroines. Her reception last night by a friendly audience will doubtless encourage her to adopt the stage as a profession, and her sprightliness and evident intelligence will make her path easy. Her future will depend upon herself, her capacity for instruction, and the discretion of her advisers. If she is not exactly the shining star we were led to expect, she is a very lively and promising actress, who may be as easily spoilt as improved."

Also, Bell's Life in London, April 13, 1867, said:—

"Shakespere's lovely pastoral play of 'As You Like It' has been acted here every evening this week for the purpose of affording Mrs. Scott-Siddons an opportunity of appearing before a London audience. The lady bears a striking likeness to her great ancestress, though her form and figure may be pronounced neat and graceful rather than majestic. Her conception of a character, confessedly one of the most beautiful in the catalogue of Shakespere's heroines, was marked by great intelligence, and in the forest scenes, by vivacity and sprightliness of the most effective kind. The house has been crowded, and the applause bestowed of the most enthusiastic nature."

A criticism of her November 30, 1868 performance as Rosalind at the New York Theater appeared in the New-York Tribune, December 1, 1868:—

"She was greeted with frank and cordial applause on the occasion of her entrance, and she aroused real enthusiasm before making her final exit. As a woman she is all that can be deemed delightful. Her figure is slight, but full of roundness and grace. Her countenance is bright, sensitive, intellectual and very handsome. Her voice is clear and pleasant. She is full of intelligence. She wins immediately upon the heart as well as the mind. She is not a great actress, but she is largely gifted with talents, and more than all, with that spark of vital earnestness which makes talent magnetic. Nothing could be sweeter than her interpretation of Rosalind's capricious moods— her gladness in the presence of her lover, her veiled joy in him, and in her love of him, and her tantalizing assumption of whole-hearted levity. The graciousness and sweetness of womanhood in its best state of innocence glared in her acting throughout these scenes. In the scene in which Rosalind bids Orlando to woo her, and the later scene of the mock marriage, she attained the climax as well of her revelation of talent and mental quality as of her popular success, in these she sparkled. With so much beauty, with delicate sensuousness of temperament, brilliancy of animal spirits, and sunny, breezy clearness of intellect, it cannot be but experience will make her an actress of the first class in comedy character."
