= Ambrose Henry Webb =

Irish barrister and jurist

Chief Justice of Sierra Leone
- In office 1937 – November 1939
- Preceded by: Sir Arthur Frederick Clarence Webber
- Succeeded by: Sir George Graham Paul

Chief Justice of Tanganyika
- In office November 1939 – 1945
- Preceded by: Llewelyn Dalton
- Succeeded by: George Graham Paul

Personal details
- Born: 13 August 1882 Taghshinny, County Longford, Ireland.
- Died: 13 August 1964 (aged 82) Tunbridge Wells, Kent, England
- Occupation: Barrister, judge

Sir Ambrose Henry Webb (13 August 1882 – 19 May 1964) was an Irish barrister and jurist who served in various positions in the British colonial empire.

== Early years ==
Ambrose Henry Webb was born on 13 August 1882 in Tashinny, County Longford, Ireland. His parents were Charles Alexander Webb (1849–1916), land agent of Park Place, Tashinny, and Louisa Maria Bole (1855–1916). He was the older brother of Samuel Cecil Webb, who was killed in action on 3 October 1916, and of Hubert Webb, who became a veterinarian in Barnstaple, England.

Webb became an Irish barrister in 1909. He married Agnes Ellen Gunn, younger daughter of Michael Ralph Thomas Gunn, the builder and owner of the Gaiety Theatre, Dublin and his actress wife Barbara Elizabeth Johnstone, who used the stage name Bessie Sudlow.

== Colonial career ==
Webb joined the Colonial Legal Service. He was first appointed to the judicial department of Palestine on 29 January 1921. In 1921 he was president of the Samaria (Nablus) district court in Palestine. In 1932 Webb was still based at Nablus.

In 1933 Webb became a puisne judge in Kenya. On 12 January 1934 Webb was appointed a divorce judge. On 7 February 1936 Webb, a judge of the Supreme Court of Kenya, was appointed chairman of a commission to inquire into allegations of abuse and hardship in the collection of hut and poll taxes in Kenya. Webb was appointed Chief Justice of Sierra Leone in 1937.

On 8 November 1939 the Colonial Office announced the appointment of Ambrose Henry Webb, K.C., Chief Justice of Sierra Leone, to be Chief Justice of Tanganyika. He took the place of Sir Llewelyn Dalton, who had retired. In the 1941 New Year Honours he was made a Knight Bachelor.

There had long been strong differences of opinion between the administration and the judiciary in Tanganyika over the court system. Judges thought their legal training and courtroom skills made them best qualified to run the courts, while administrators thought their local experience and (in their view) understanding of the natives made them better qualified. As the emergency demands of World War II receded the administration began to take action. The outspoken Justice Reginald Montagu Cluer was transferred to Jamaica, and the governor asked for an outsider to replace Webb. The well-qualified Mark Wilson, who had been a judge in Tanganyika for many years, was passed over. George Graham Paul was brought in from Sierra Leone, where he had been Chief Justice.

After he retired, Webb and his wife lived at The Highlands Hotel, Crowborough, Sussex. Webb died in the Clarence Nursing Home, Tunbridge Wells, Kent on 19 May 1964 at the age of 82.

== Sources ==
- Empire Affairs, 8 November 1939
- Feingold, Ellen R. (9 February 2018), Colonial Justice and Decolonization in the High Court of Tanzania, 1920-1971, Springer, ISBN 978-3-319-69691-1
- Goldthorpe, Liz (20 April 2020), Sir (Ambrose) Henry Webb, National Portrait Gallery
- Government of Palestine (PDF), 1932, p. 110
- Jack, Murray M. (23 January 1934), "Government Notice No. 55", Kenya Gazette
- Palestine (1930), "Judicial Department", Blue Book, Printing and Stationery Office.
- "Samuel Cecil Webb", Longford at War, Longford County Library, Archives and Heritage Services, Longford, Ireland
- "Supplement:35029 : Colonies, Protectorates, etc.", The London Gazette, 31 December 1940
- Wade, A de V, Governor´s Deputy (11 February 1936), "Government Notice No 99", Kenya Gazette
