= Paget Bourke =

British colonial judge

Sir Paget John Bourke, SC (1906 – 7 November 1983) was an Irish barrister and British colonial judge who served as chief justice of Sierra Leone and Cyprus.

== Biography ==
The son of H.C. Bourke, of Amana, Ballina, County Mayo, Ireland, Bourke was educated at Mount St Mary's College, Chesterfield, and at Trinity College, Dublin (Mod. BA, LLB). He was called to the Irish Bar at King's Inns in 1928.

He joined the Colonial Legal Service as Legal Adviser and Crown Prosecutor in the Seychelles in 1933, where he was a member of the Executive and Legislative Councils. He then served in Palestine, as a Chief Magistrate in 1936 and Relieving President of a District Court in 1941, and President of a District Court in 1945. He was then a Judge of Supreme Court of Kenya in 1946, Chief Justice of Sierra Leone from 1955 to 1957; Chief Justice of Cyprus from 1957 to 1960. He was called to the English Bar at Gray's Inn in 1957, and was knighted the same year.

On his retirement from the Colonial Service, he returned to Dublin and became a Senior Counsel at the Irish Bar in 1961. He then became, on a part-time basis, a judge of the Courts of Appeal for the Bahamas, Bermuda from 1965, and of Belize from 1968; he was president of these courts from 1970 to 1975. He was also a Justice of Appeal in Gibraltar from 1970 to 1976, having served as acting Chief Justice of Gibraltar from October to December 1965.

He was kidnapped in Dublin in 1975, but managed to escape at the border with Northern Ireland. He later retired to his daughter's ranch on the banks of the Kootenay River near Cranbrook, British Columbia, Canada, where he died.

== Family ==
In 1936, Bourke married Susan Dorothy (née Killeen), whose cousin of the same name had once been Michael Collins' girlfriend. They had three sons and a daughter. Lady Bourke died in 1982. Sir Paget Bourke was a paternal uncle of Irish president Mary Robinson.
