= Nicholas Colin Browne-Marke =

British judge

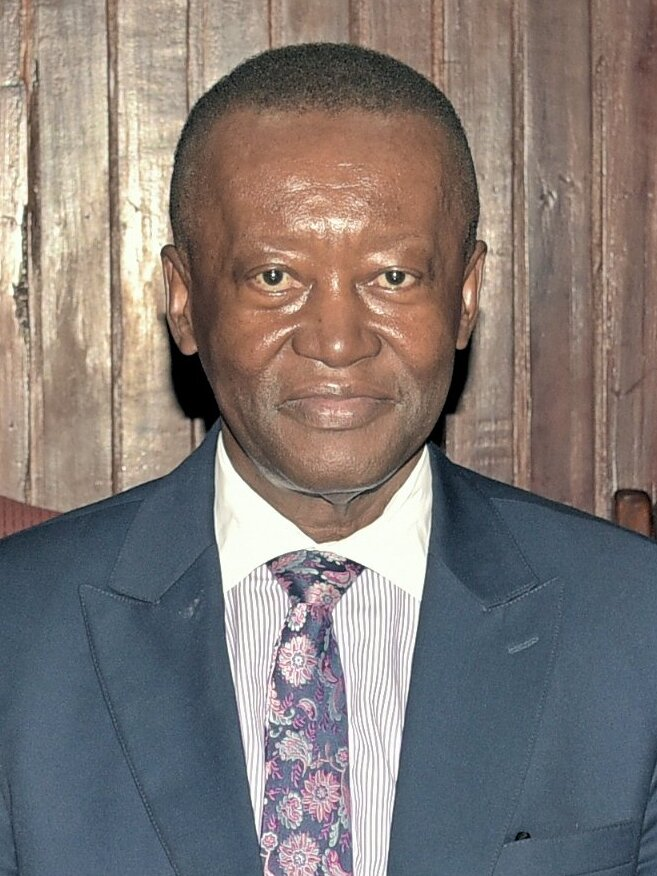

Justice of the Supreme Court of the Gambia
- Incumbent
- Assumed office 30 December 2016
- President: Adama Barrow

Justice of the Supreme Court of Sierra Leone
- Incumbent
- Assumed office 19 December 2014
- President: Ernest Bai Koroma

Personal details
- Born: 15 June 1957 (age 69)
- Education: Inns of Court School of Law

Nicholas Colin Browne-Marke (born 15 June 1957) is a British-born judge of Sierra Leone Creole parentage. He is currently a Justice of the Supreme Court of Sierra Leone and a Justice of the Supreme Court of the Gambia.

== Early life and education ==
Browne-Marke was born in England, United Kingdom. He studied law at the Inns of Court School of Law, graduating in 1979, and was called to the bar at Inner Temple in 1981.

== Early career ==
Browne-Marke worked as a state counsel in Sierra Leone's Director of Public Prosecutions Office from 1982 to 1989, before entering private practice.

== Courts of Appeal ==
In 2007, he began lecturing at Sierra Leone Law School, in Freetown, and was also appointed as a Senior Justice on the Court of Appeal of Sierra Leone.

In 2009, Browne-Marke oversaw proceedings in a landmark cocaine trial. 600 kg of cocaine had been brought into the country on 28 July 2008 from Venezuela by a Cessna aircraft painted with a fake Red Cross logo. On 21 April 2009, of the 15 accused in the trial, he handed out custodian sentences and fines to all. For the Sierra Leoneans, the fines ranged from 25 million Leones (equivalent to $8,000 at the time) to 300 million Leones (equivalent to $100,000 at the time). The sentences ranged from two years to five. For the accused foreigners, the fines ranged from $1.5 million to $4 million, with prison sentences of five years. Browne-Marke ordered that the cocaine be destroyed within 48 hours of the verdict, which took place on 23 April and was witnessed by international observers.

== Supreme Court justice ==
On 19 December 2014, Browne-Marke was sworn in as a Justice of the Supreme Court of Sierra Leone by President Ernest Bai Koroma. He was initially appointed by President Yahya Jammeh to the Supreme Court of the Gambia on 30 December 2016, in order to hear Jammeh's election petition regarding the 2016 presidential election. However, he declined to take up his seat to hear the petition, and was seen the day prior to the hearing still in Freetown. He was re-confirmed by President Adama Barrow to the Supreme Court of the Gambia in May 2017. On 24 November 2017, Browne-Marke was noted as a potential candidate for Chief Justice of Sierra Leone, described as having an "unblemished record".
