= Llewelyn Dalton =

British colonial judge and author

Sir Llewelyn Chisholm Dalton (21 April 1871 – 5 January 1945) was a British colonial judge and author.

== Background and education ==
He was the only son of William Edward Dalton and his wife Mathilda. His paternal grandfather was John Neale Dalton, chaplain to Queen Victoria. Dalton was educated at Marlborough College and went then to Trinity College, Cambridge, graduating with a Bachelor of Arts in the historical tripos in 1900 and a Master of Arts five years thereafter.

== Career ==
Dalton was called to the bar by Gray's Inn in 1901 and became then employed as legal assistant at the Land Settlement Board of the Orange River Colony. A year later, he was appointed a justice of the peace and worked as assistant resident magistrate. In 1910, when the Colony was incorporated into the Union of South Africa, Dalton moved to British Guiana joining its Supreme Court as a registrar. Until 1919, he acted at several times in various offices and in June of that year became a Puisne Judge.

He was transferred to the Gold Coast Colony in 1923 and to Ceylon in 1925. Dalton received an appointment as Chief Justice of Tanganyika in 1936 and after two years was created a Knight Bachelor. He retired in 1939 and returned to England.

== Family ==
In 1906, Dalton married Beatrice Templeton, daughter of William B. Cotton; they had a son and three daughters. She died in 1823 and after eight years as a widower, he remarried Winifred, only daughter of Edward Adams. Dalton died in Sussex in 1945.

One of his sons was the colonial lawyer and judge Philip Neale Dalton.

== Works ==
- Law Reports, British Guiana, ed.
- Statutory Rules and Orders, British Guiana
- The Civil Law of British Guiana, (1921)
- Digest of British Guiana Case Law, (1922)
- Burge's Colonial and Foreign Laws, Vol. IV, ed.

== Notes ==
Legal offices
Preceded by Sidney Solomon Abrahams	Chief Justice of Tanganyika; 1936–1939	Succeeded by Ambrose Henry Webb
