= Arthur Frederick Clarence Webber =

Chief Justice of Sierra Leone
- In office 1933–1937
- Preceded by: Mervyn Lawrence Tew
- Succeeded by: Ambrose Henry Webb

Personal details
- Born: 12 March 1873 British Guiana
- Died: 22 December 1952 (aged 79) Henfield, Sussex, England
- Occupation: Lawyer, judge

Sir Arthur Frederick Clarence Webber (12 March 1873 – 22 December 1952) was a British lawyer and judge who served in British Guiana, Nigeria and Sierra Leone, where he was Chief Justice.

== Life ==
Arthur Frederick Clarence Webber was born in Georgetown in British Guiana (now Guyana), on 12 March 1873, son of Arthur Weber. He attended Queen's College in British Guiana and then studied at Merton College, Oxford in England. In 1896 he became a barrister of the Inner Temple. He practiced at the bar in British Guiana, then in 1900 became a magistrate. In 1901 he Married Kathleen Mary Kennard. They had three sons and two daughters.

After nine years Webber was appointed a Judge of the Supreme Court of Nigeria. He was involved in a 1916 dispute between the Ibeno and Eket peoples over ownership of the sea shore and adjacent swamp, in which he ruled that both should be allowed to use the land. In 1919 Webber was listed as one of three puisne judges in Nigeria under Chief Justice R. M. Combe. The position paid £1,000 annually, plus £200 duty pay. In the 1920s he was based in Calabar, where he had to deal with problems related to migrant Hausas from the north. Another issue was his recognition of the Olu of Jekri as overlord over all Itsekiri lands, which was convenient for the administration but disputed by the people. The judgement was later overturned after appeals by the Itsekiri lawyers Godwin Boyo and Arthur Prest.

Webber left Nigeria in 1933 to become Chief Justice of Sierra Leone. On 23 June 1936 it was announced that the King of England on his birthday had conferred the honor of knighthood on Webber. He retired in 1937 and returned to England. He died on 19 December 1952.

== Sources ==
- Burns, A.C., ed. (1919), "Civil Establishment", The Nigeria handbook containing statistical and general information respecting the colony and protectorate, Lagos: Nigeria. Chief Secretary's Office
- "Colonies, Protectorates, &c." (PDF), The London Gazette, pp. 3996–3997, 23 June 1936
- Dan A. Obiomah (1975), The Land Factor in Inter-community Feuds in Warri
- Egodi Uchendu (2018), Islam in the Niger Delta 1890—2017 A Synthesis of the Accounts of Indigenes and Migrants, Studien zum Modernen Orient 32, Berlin: Klaus Schwarz Verlag GmbH
- Kidman, Thomas, ed. (22 December 1952), "Webber, Sir Arthur", London Times
- Marcus Leton (2006), The Politics of a Company Town - A Case Study of Eket and Ibeno, Akwa Ibom State, Institute of International Studies, University of California, Berkeley, USA
- Peter P. Ekeh (2007), "Colonialism and the Scramble for Urhobo Lands", in Peter Palmer Ekeh (ed.), History of the Urhobo People of Niger Delta, Urhobo Historical Society, ISBN 9789780772888
- Reynecke, Hendrik Jacobus (31 May 2017), "Sir Arthur Frederick Clarence Webber (Weber)", Geni
