= Supreme Court of Sierra Leone =

National supreme court

Sierra Leone Supreme Court
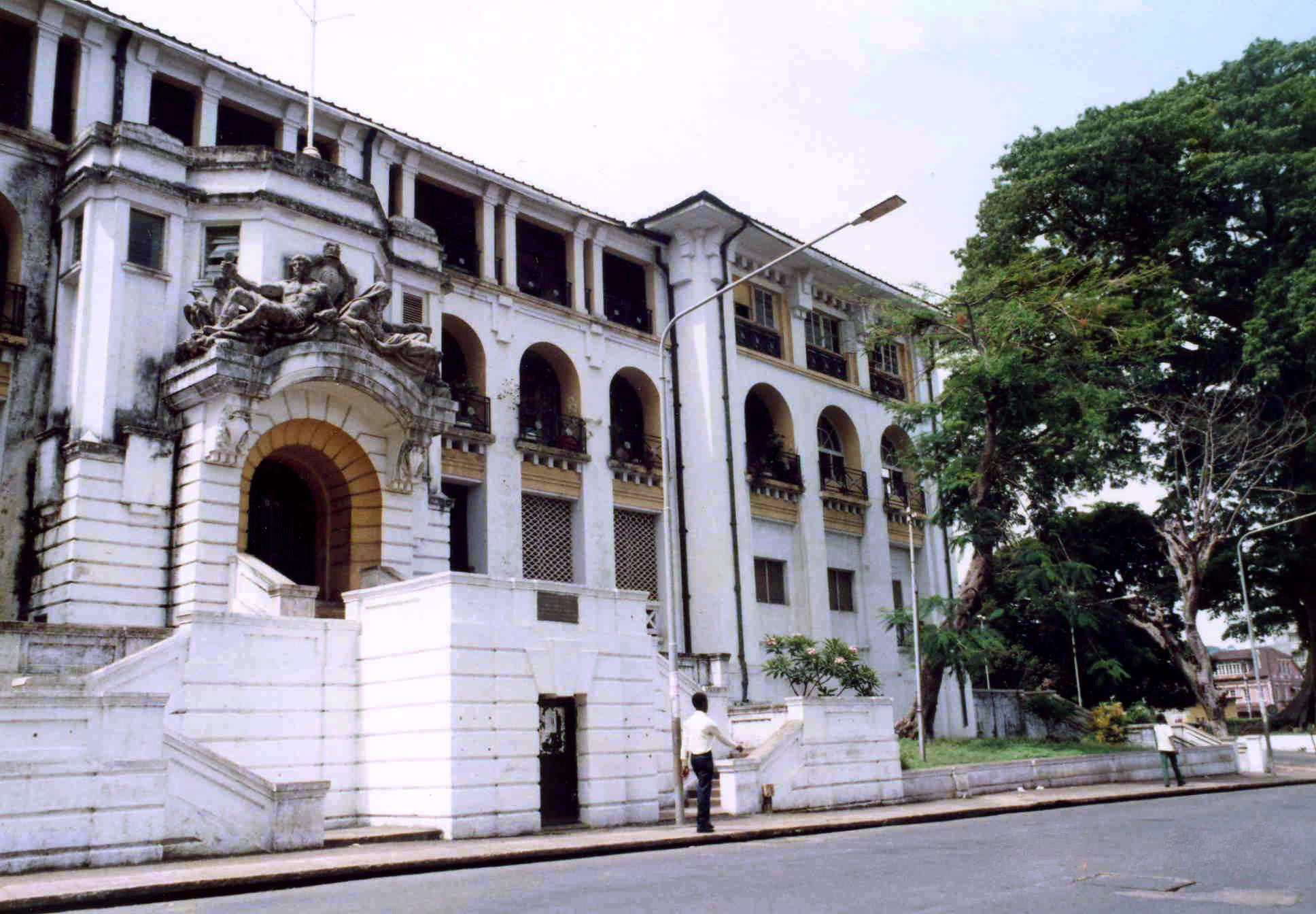
- Sierra Leone Supreme Court building
- Established: 1960; 66 years ago
- Jurisdiction: Sierra Leone
- Location: Siaka Stevens Street Freetown, Sierra Leone
- Authorised by: Constitution of Sierra Leone
- Number of positions: Five Supreme Court Justices

Chief Justice of Sierra Leone
- Currently: Nicholas Colin Browne-Marke
- Since: December 2023

The Supreme Court of Sierra Leone is the highest court in Sierra Leone. It has final jurisdiction in all civil, criminal, and constitutional cases within Sierra Leone, and its decisions cannot be appealed. The Supreme Court has the exclusive constitutional power to overturn ruling of lower courts within the jurisdiction of Sierra Leone. The Supreme Court, along with the Court of Appeals, High Court of Justice, and magistrate courts form the Judicial branch of the Government of Sierra Leone.

Prior to 1971, there was a right of appeal from the Supreme Court of Sierra Leone to the Judicial Committee of the Privy Council in London, England.

The Supreme Court of Sierra Leone consists of Supreme Court justices, headed by the Chief Justice. The Judges are nominated by the President of Sierra Leone and must be confirmed by the Parliament of Sierra Leone by at least 60% majority vote in order to take office.

The Supreme Court building, known as Law Court, is located on Siaka Stevens Street in the Central business district in downtown Freetown.

== Membership ==
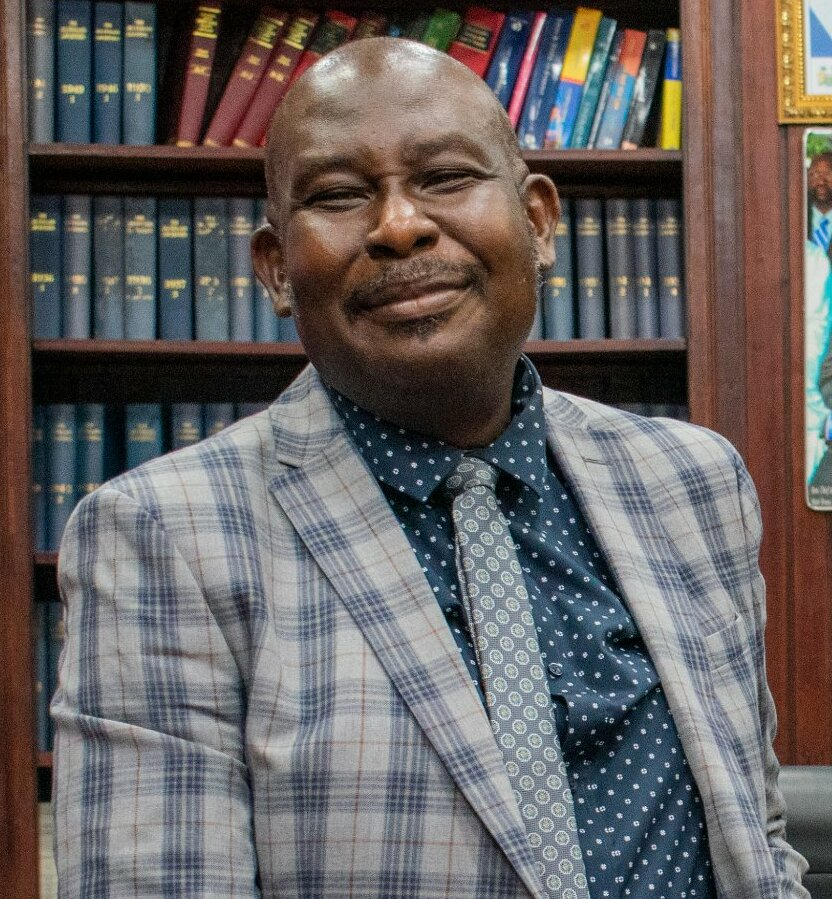
Chief Justice Desmond Babatunde Edwards

Name	Since	Notes
Desmond Babatunde Edwards	19 December 2018	
Vivian Margaret Solomon	19 December 2014	
Patrick Omolade Hamilton		
Nicholas Colin Browne-Marke	19 December 2014	Acting Chief Justice
Emmanuel Ekundayo Robert	19 December 2014	

== Chief Justices ==
- Nicholas Colin Browne-Marke (December 2023-)
- Desmond Babatunde Edwards (19 Dec 2018-December 2023)
- Abdulai Hamid Charm (11 Jan 2016 – 19 Dec 2018)
- Valesius Thomas (2015; acting)
- Umu Hawa Tejan-Jalloh (25 Jan 2008–2015)
- Ade Renner Thomas (2005-2008)
- Abdulai Timbo (2002–2004)
- Desmond Edgar Luke (1998-2002)
- Samuel Beccles Davies (1993-1998)
- Sheku Fomba Kutubu (1987-1993)
- Eben Livesey Luke (1978-1985)
- Christopher Okoro Cole (1970-1978)
- Banja Tejan-Sie (1967-1968)
- Gershon Collier (1967)
- Sir Samuel Bankole Jones (1963-1965)
- Sir Salako Benka-Coker (1960-)
- Sir Vahe Robert Bairamian (1957–1959)
- Sir Paget John Bourke (1955–1957)
- Sir Allan Chalmers Smith (1951–1955)
- Sir John Alfred Lucie Smith (c.1949)
- Sir George Graham Paul (1939-1945)
- Ambrose Henry Webb (1937-1939)
- Sir Arthur Frederick Clarence Webber (1933-1937)
- Sir Mervyn Lawrence Tew (1929-c.1932)
- Sir Gilbert Kenelm Treffry Purcell (1911-1929)
- Sir P. Crampton Smyly (1901-1911)
- George Stallard (1897-1901)
- Edward Bruce Hindle (1895-1897; died in office)
- Sir William Hollingworth Quayle Jones (1887-1895)
- Sir Samuel Lewis (1882, 1884; acting)
- Francis F. Pinkett (1881, 1882-1887; died in office)
- Sir William Warren Streeten (1880-1881)
- Horatio James Huggins (1876-1880)
- George French (1867-1875)
- John Charles Carr (1841-1865)
- Logan Hook (1841; acting)
- Owen Flintoff (1840-1841; died in office)
- Robert Rankin (1833-1839; died in office)
- Sir John William Jeffcott (1830-1833; removed from office)
- George Rendall (1829-1830)
- John William Bannister (1828–1829; died in office)
- Joseph Reffell (1927; acting)
- Daniel Malloy Hamilton (1824-1826; died in office)
- Kenneth Macaulay (1824; acting)
- Edward Fitzgerald (1817-1823; died in office)
- Dr. Robert Hogan (1816-1817; died in office)
- Robert Thorpe (1808-1815)
