= Abdulai Hamid Charm =

Sierra Leonean judge

Chief Justice of Sierra Leone
- In office January 21, 2016 – December 19, 2018
- Nominated by: Ernest Bai Koroma
- Appointed by: Ernest Bai Koroma
- Preceded by: Umu Hawa Tejan-Jalloh
- Succeeded by: Desmond Babatunde Edwards

Sierra Leone Court of Appeal Judge
- In office December, 2014 – January 2016

Sierra Leone High Court Judge
- In office June 2011 – December 2014

Personal details
- Born: 20 July 1963 (age 63) Kuala, Kambia District, Sierra Leone
- Education: University of Pretoria
- Profession: Judge, Attorney
- Religion: Islam

Abdulai Hamid Charm (born 20 July 1963) is a Sierra Leonean judge, who was formerly the Chief Justice of Sierra Leone until his resignation in December 2018.

He is the first Chief Justice of Sierra Leone born outside of the capital Freetown since the establishment of the Supreme Court in 1960.

== Early life and education ==
Abdulai Hamid Charm was born in the small rural town of Kaula, Kambia District in the Northern Province of Sierra Leone. Charm was born and raised to Muslim parents, and a Muslim himself.

Justice Charm received a Bachelor of Laws with Honours in 1990 from Fourah Bay College, and a Certificate for Call to the Bar in October 1991 from the Sierra Leone Law School. In 2000 he received a Master of Laws in Human Rights and Democratization in Africa from the University of Pretoria.

== Career ==
From 1992 to 1999 he worked for the Director of Public Prosecutions Division of the Law Officers’ Department as State Counsel, and from 1999 to 2001 as Senior State Counsel. In 2001, he co-founded the first legal aid centre in Sierra Leone – the Lawyers Centre for Legal Assistance (LAWCLA) and served as Director of Litigation from 2002 to 2003. From January 2002 to October 2003 he was a lawyer in private practice.

From 2003 to 2010 he worked for Sierra Leone's National Revenue Authority: as Principal Collector, Board Secretariat, and Legal Affairs from 2003 to 2005; as Deputy Commissioner, Board Secretariat, and Board Secretary from 2005 to 2007; and as Director of Policy and Legal Affairs from 2007 to 2010. In 2010, he briefly returned to private practice before being appointed a Judge of the High Court in June 2011, and then a Judge of the Court of Appeal in 2014. He was also appointed a Judge of the Residual Special Court for Sierra Leone in 2013.

He was nominated as Chief Justice by President Ernest Bai Koroma on 28 December 2015, and after being approved by Parliament on 15 January 2016, he was sworn in as Sierra Leone's Chief Justice on 21 January 2016, succeeding retired Chief Justice Umu Hawa Tejan-Jalloh.
