= George Graham Paul =

British jurist who served in Nigeria, Sierra Leone and Tanganyika

Chief Justice of Sierra Leone
- In office 1937–1939
- Preceded by: Ambrose Henry Webb
- Succeeded by: John Alfred Lucie Smith

Chief Justice of Tanganyika
- In office 1945–1951
- Preceded by: Ambrose Henry Webb
- Succeeded by: Herbert Charles Fahie Cox

Personal details
- Born: 15 November 1887 Angus, Scotland
- Died: 1960 (aged 72–73)

Sir George Graham Paul (15 November 1887 – 1960), also known as Graham Paul or G. G. Paul, was a British jurist who served in the colonial administration in Nigeria, Sierra Leone and Tanganyika.

== Early years ==
On 12 October 1906 it was reported that Mr George Graham Paul, son of Mr George Brodie Paul, solicitor, Dundee, had qualified as M.A. of the University of St Andrews. Paul became a member of the Scottish Faculty of Advocates, a handicap in his legal career since Scots law is unique to Scotland. Despite this, he did well in the colonial judicial system.

== Colonial judiciary ==
=== Nigeria ===
In 1928 G Graham Paul was appointed an unofficial member of the Nigerian Legislative Council by governor Graeme Thomson. Paul represented the commercial interests of Calabar. During the Women's War of 1929, on 16 December 1929 British troops fired into a crowd of women protesters calling for democracy in Okigwe, killing 47 women and injuring 31. In January 1930 Paul was a member of the Aba Commission of Inquiry, where a panel of British judges held hearings and reported on the incident. Paul said, “No one listening to the evidence given before us could have failed to be impressed by the intelligence, the power of exposition, the directness and the mother-wit which some of the leaders exhibited in setting forth their grievances. And the lessons learnt from their demonstrations should be taken to heart.”

Most of the judges in Nigeria in the colonial era were administrators, and were not independent of the Executive. George Graham Paul, who served in the High Court from 1933 to 1939, was a rare exception.

=== Sierra Leone ===
In December 1939 it was announced that the king had approved the appointment of Mr. George Graham Paul, puisne judge of Nigeria, to succeed Mr. A. H. Webb as Chief Justice of Sierra Leone. Webb had recently been appointed Chief Justice of Tanganyika. On 16 July 1943 the king bestowed knighthood on George Graham Paul, Chief Justice of Sierra Leone.

Paul sat on the West African Court of Appeal. He had to deal with cases where there was a conflict between English law and local customary law. In a case where a testator had left a property to be "family property" he refused to accept that the shares of the children could be sold separately. He said, " I am not prepared to admit English law to defeat the express intention of a native testator. I hold that under the will the property in question became a 'family property' as effectively as if the children had succeeded to it under native law and custom in intestacy". In another case, he said his view was that where the parties to a cause or matter are natives the onus is upon the party who opposes the application of such native customary law to satisfy the court that it should not be applied.

=== Tanganyika ===
There had long been strong differences of opinion between the administration and the judiciary in Tanganyika over the court system. Judges thought their legal training and courtroom skills made them best qualified to run the courts, while administrators thought their local experience and (in their view) understanding of the natives made them better qualified. As the emergency demands of World War II receded the administration began to take action. The outspoken Justice Reginald Montagu Cluer was transferred to Jamaica, and the governor asked for an outsider to replace Webb. The well-qualified Mark Wilson, who had been a judge in Tanganyika for many years, was passed over. George Graham Paul was brought in from Sierra Leone.

In June 1945 Sir George Graham Paul, Chief Justice, Sierra Leone was confirmed as Chief Justice of His Majesty's High Court, Tanganyika. Attorney General C McFurness-Smith welcomed Paul in a ceremony at the High Court of Tanganyika. World War II (1939–1945) had just been concluded. McFurness-Smith said the colony was entering a new era of prosperity since British rule was, for the first time, firmly and permanently established.

== Sources ==
- Daniels, W. C. Ekow (April 1964), "The Interaction of English Law with Customary Law in West Africa", The International and Comparative Law Quarterly, 1 (2), Cambridge University Press on behalf of the British Institute of International and Comparative Law: 574–616, doi:10.1093/iclqaj/13.2.574, JSTOR 756207
- "Downing Street, June, 1945" (PDF), The London Gazette, p. 3140
- Feingold, Ellen R. (9 February 2018), Colonial Justice and Decolonization in the High Court of Tanzania, 1920-1971, Springer, ISBN 978-3-319-69691-1
- "Firmly Established", Tanganyika Standard, 1945
- Hagen, Patricia (2015), "Ogu Umunwaanyi: The Women's War", Pangaea Journal
- Lord Macmillan (1952), A Man Of Laws Tale, London: Macmillan
- "Mr George Graham Paul", Dundee Courier, Angus, Scotland, 12 October 1906
- Olúfémi Táíwò (2010), How Colonialism Preempted Modernity in Africa (PDF), Indiana University Press, ISBN 978-0-253-22130-8
- "Personal", The Evening Star, Dunedin, 28 December 1939
- Wheare, Joan (1949), The Nigerian Legislative Council, Faber & Faber
- "Whitehall, July 16, 1943" (PDF), The London Gazette
