= Umu Hawa Tejan-Jalloh =

Sierra Leonean lawyer

Umu Hawa Tejan-Jalloh GCOR

Chief Justice of Sierra Leone
- In office January 2008 – February 2015
- Nominated by: Ernest Bai Koroma
- Preceded by: Ade Renner Thomas
- Succeeded by: Abdulai Hamid Charm

Sierra Leone Court of Appeals Judge
- In office 2004–2008
- Nominated by: Ahmad Tejan Kabbah

Sierra Leone High Court Judge
- In office 1996–2004
- Nominated by: Ahmad Tejan Kabbah

Personal details
- Born: 16 April 1949 (age 77) Freetown, Sierra Leone
- Party: None
- Education: Columbia University; College of Law, London
- Profession: Judge

Umu Hawa Tejan-Jalloh GCOR (born April 16, 1949) is a Sierra Leonean lawyer who was the first female Chief Justice of Sierra Leone from 2008 to 2015.

== Early life and background ==
She was born on April 16, 1949 and grew up in the Sierra Leonean capital Freetown to Muslim parents from the Fula ethnic group, originally from Koinadugu District in the north part of Sierra Leone. Like her parents, Umu Hawa Tejan-Jalloh is also a Muslim, unlike her great grandmother on the maternal side who was a Methodist Christian hailed from Koya Chiefdom (then Koya Kingdom) in the Port Loko District. She is the older sister of Sierra Leonean diplomat Sulaiman Tejan-Jalloh. Jalloh's mother was the President of the Sierra Leone National Fullah Women’s Association for twenty six years; and her father served in the Freetown City Council.

== Education ==
She attended the Harford Secondary School for Girls in Moyamba, Moyamba District and the St. Edward's Secondary School in Freetown. After her secondary education, she gained admission to Columbia University in New York City, New York, United States where she graduated with a Bachelor of Arts degree (History and Political Science). Following her graduation from Columbia in 1971, she commenced a Bachelor of Laws (LLB) degree at the College of Law, London, and in 1974 undertook her post finals at the Council of Legal Education in London. In November of the same year, she was called to the Bar of the Honorable Society of Gray's Inn, London.

== Career ==
In 1975, she was appointed as a State Counsel in the Sierra Leone Ministry of Justice. She was later promoted to senior State Counsel and Principal State Council. In 1996 she was appointed as a High Court Judge, where she served until 2004, when she was appointed as a Court of Appeals Judge. She remained in that position until she was appointed as the Supreme Court's Chief Justice in 2008.

She was sworn in as Sierra Leone's Chief Justice on January 25, 2008, succeeding retired Chief Justice Ade Renner Thomas. She was the first woman to hold the Chief Justice position in Sierra Leone's history.

She proceeded on leave to retirement on 6 February 2015, with Valesius Thomas as acting Chief Justice, until finally being replaced by Abdulai Hamid Charm on 25 January 2016.

== Honors ==
- Sierra Leone: Grand Commander of the Order of the Rokel (2008)

== See also ==
- First women lawyers around the world
