= Michael Ralph Thomas Gunn =

Irish businessman and theatre manager (1840–1901)

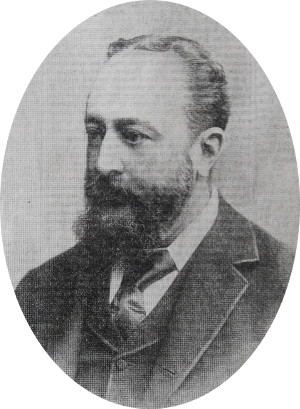
- Michael Gunn c. 1890
- Born: 1840
- Died: 24 October 1901 (aged 60–61)
- Occupation: Theater manager
- Known for: Gaiety Theatre, Dublin

Michael Ralph Thomas Gunn (1840 – 24 October 1901) was an Irish businessman and theatre manager who built and ran the Gaiety Theatre, Dublin. For several years he was closely involved with Richard D'Oyly Carte, and the Gilbert and Sullivan operas. He invested in some of Carte's ventures and helped manage Carte's theatre and touring productions in England while Carte was in the United States.

== Early years ==
Michael Gunn, the father of Michael Ralph Thomas Gunn, moved to Dublin from Scotland and began work as a piano tuner. His wife, Elle, was a corsetière. They settled in Fleet Street, where their sons, John and Michael, were born in 1832 and 1840. They spent three years in Clare Street and then in 1850 opened a business at 13 Westland Row (Note: The Wilde family were neighbours of the Gunns in Westland Row.) selling pianofortes and harmoniums. Later they expanded into selling and publishing sheet music. Michael junior was interested in music as a child, and became an accomplished player of the violin and the piano.

The brothers John and Michael Gunn both worked in the family music business. In 1861 their father died in a horse-drawn omnibus accident when the driver lost control and the vehicle was backed into a canal lock. In 1862 his widow was awarded £4,660 in damages. In 1864 M. Gunn and Sons moved to a large location at 16 Grafton Street in downtown Dublin. They advertised "the finest collection of pianofortes ever brought together in Ireland". The company opened a branch in Cork in 1869.

In November 1872 Michael Gunn stood as a candidate for the Royal Exchange ward of the Dublin Municipal Council. In an election speech he declared himself to be a Liberal and supporter of Home Rule. He won the seat with 162 votes against his opponent Mr Casson, who secured 123 votes. He held his seat on the Municipal Council until November 1878 when he had to retire from this position due to the demands of his business enterprises. He loved travel and spoke fluent French and Italian, as well as some German. It was while visiting France and Italy that the idea came to him of building a modern theater in Dublin.

== Gaiety Theatre ==
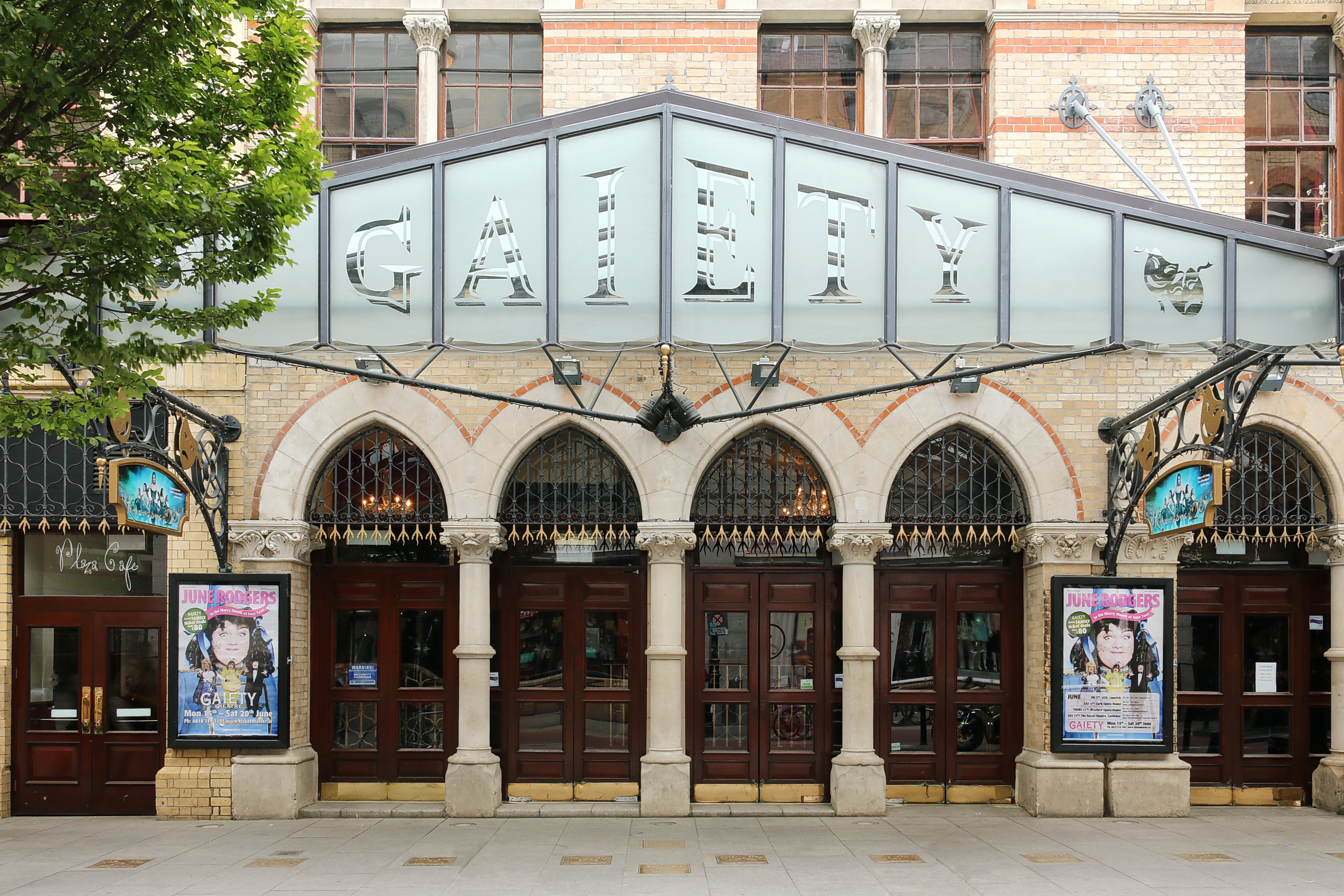
The Gaiety Theatre, King St South, Dublin

On 21 April 1871 John and Michael Gunn obtained a 21-year license to establish "a well-regulated theatre and therein at all times publicly to act, represent or perform any interlude, tragedy, comedy, prelude, opera, burletta, play, farce or pantomime". The brothers had the Gaiety Theatre built on South King Street in Dublin 1871 for £26,000. Construction was completed in just 28 weeks. The designer was C. J. Phipps, who was already experienced in theatre design. The Lord Mayor of Dublin laid the foundation stone in a ceremony on 1 July 1871, although by that time the work was already quite advanced. The Gaiety Theatre opened on 27 November 1871. The opening performance was She Stoops to Conquer, performed by the John Woods Company. The prologue by John Francis Wall was delivered by Mary Frances Scott-Siddons.

From the outset the Gunns decided that their new theatre would be a "receiving house": that is, it would receive touring companies and would not have its own company of actors or a repertory programme. While other Dublin theaters had resident performers and technical staff, the Gaiety provided a stage for touring companies almost all year apart from Christmas, when it put on a pantomime produced in-house. This gave the public more variety, gave the touring companies a larger audience, and saved money since the theatre needed fewer employees. The Gunns brought the best actors and troupes to Dublin each year, performing classic plays by Shakespeare and others, classical opera, light opera from Gilbert and Sullivan, and opéra bouffe. Adelaide Ristori and Sarah Bernhardt appeared at the Gaiety. Emily Soldene caused a sensation when she wore tights and rode a horse onto the stage.

In March 1874 the Gunn brothers acquired the Theatre Royal, Dublin from John Harris, who had run it for nearly 25 years. Michael Gunn opened the programme at the Theatre Royal, just a week after taking over, on April 5, 1874 with The Lancashire Lass. John and Michael Gunn remained joint owners of the Gaiety; John managed the Gaiety while Michael managed the Theatre Royal. Following a long illness, John died on 22 April 1878; Michael became sole manager of both theatres.

== Collaboration with Richard D'Oyly Carte ==
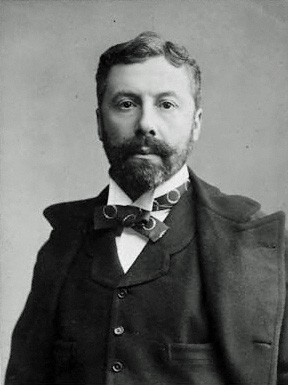
Richard D'Oyly Carte

In June 1875 the Madame Dolaro Company, managed by Richard D'Oyly Carte, went on tour in England and Ireland performing La Périchole, La fille de Madame Angot, and Trial by Jury by Gilbert and Sullivan. After ten weeks in England, the company opened at the Gaiety Theatre on 5 September 1875. Carte spent time with the Gunns, and Michael Gunn became enthusiastic about Carte's plans for comic opera in England. Michael Gunn became a close friend of Carte (Note: Carte later said of Michael Gunn, "I have a greater respect and regard for him than I think for any man living except my father.") and later became Carte's business partner.

In June 1879 Carte left to arrange Gilbert and Sullivan productions in the United States after appointing Gunn to manage his opera business in England during his absence. Gunn sent two companies to play Gilbert and Sullivan's H.M.S. Pinafore in theatres around the British provinces, one with Richard Mansfield as Sir Joseph Porter and the other with W. S. Penley as Sir Joseph, and the contralto Alice Barnett as Little Buttercup. During Carte's absence Gunn stood in for Carte in legal disputes with the Comedy Opera Company in London, which had originally financed Pinafore.

In 1879 Carte became interested in a site on the Strand in London as a place to build a new theatre. In 1880 he involved Gunn, who helped him find businessmen to form a syndicate in which both Gunn and Carte had shares. At first the new theatre was to be called the Beaufort, but that was later changed to the Savoy Theatre after the nearby site of the ancient Savoy Palace. C. J. Phipps was commissioned as architect. The Savoy opened on 10 October 1881. In 1881 Gunn upset Gilbert by booking a musical piece by another author for the Savoy, and Gunn was forced to move it to another theatre.

At the start of 1882 Carte was bound for New York, while Gunn was supervising the Gilbert and Sullivan touring companies and managing the Savoy Theatre. Gunn continued to invest in opportunities in London. For example, he took a major stake in the Savoy Turkish Baths Company. The prospectus of the Savoy Hotel, issued a few months before it opened in August 1889, listed Gunn among the directors.

== Later activities ==
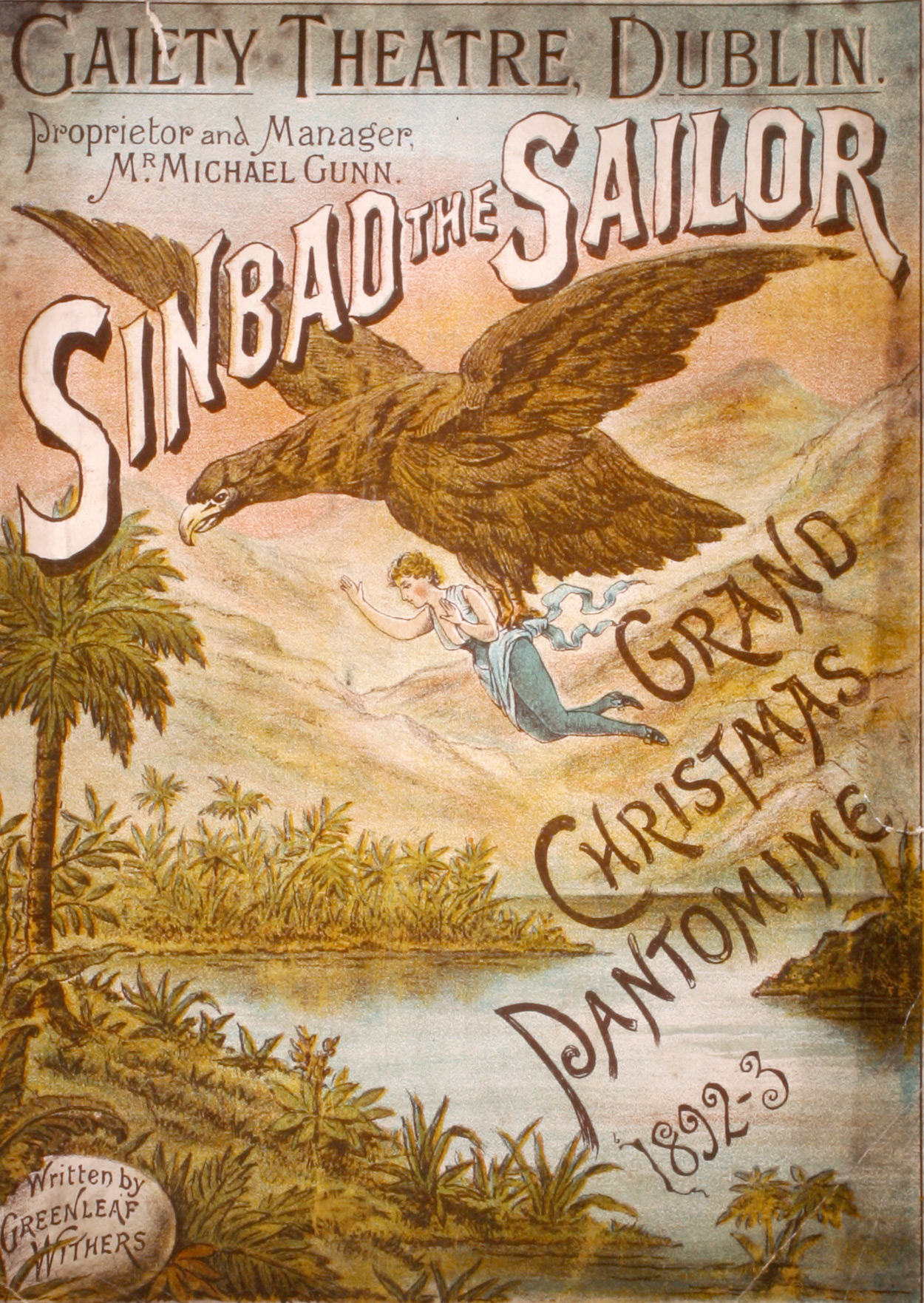
Cover of a programme for Sinbad the Sailor, Christmas 1892 pantomime at the Gaiety

The Theatre Royal in Dublin was completely destroyed by fire on 9 February 1879. Gunn began to spend more of his time in Dublin. In 1883 he employed the theatre architect Frank Matcham to expand the Gaiety. Matcham redecorated the auditorium in baroque style and built an extension to the west that held the parterre and dress-circle bars. In 1886 Gunn built a new theatre, Leinster Hall, on the site of the Theatre Royal. Adelina Patti sang at the opening concerts and returned in 1891 and 1895. Nellie Melba gave two concerts there in 1893. The hall was used for affordable concerts such as the Promenade Concerts and the Dublin Popular Concerts. Gunn later opened the first commercial gymnasium in Ireland in an annexe to the hall. After Gunn retired and moved to London, Leinster Hall was converted in 1897 to become a new Theatre Royal.

== Family life ==
Gunn was attracted to a member of Carte's 1875 company, Barbara Johnstone, who used the stage name Bessie Sudlow. Carte was Gunn's best man when he married Johnstone on 26 October 1876 at the St Marylebone Parish Church, London. The bride was given away by George Dolby. (Note: George Dolby (1831–1900), was a theatre manager and a close friend of Charles Dickens.) Afterwards, Johnstone performed on stage only once more. They had six children, including Kevin (born 1880), Brendan (born 1881), Selskar and Haidée (both born in 1883), and Agnes. Haidée and Agnes both became actresses. Agnes later became Lady Webb as wife of Sir Ambrose Henry Webb. Selskar Gunn became prominent as an expert in public health.

Gunn and Bessie had a house in Merrion Square, Dublin, and another in Russell Square, London. They were one of the richest families in Dublin, and often held large gatherings at their house. Gunn was a close friend of John Stanislaus Joyce, father of James Joyce. James Joyce became a friend of Michael's son Selskar. In Joyce's Finnegans Wake, Gunn (or Makeall Gone, Gun the farther, etc.) is repeatedly used as a symbol of the creator-god-father.

Gunn died at another London residence near Hampstead on 24 October 1901 at the age of 61. His estate was estimated at just over £20,000. His wife became owner of the Gaiety and held it until 1909.

== Sources ==
- Ainger, Michael (21 November 2002), Gilbert and Sullivan: A Dual Biography, Oxford University Press, USA, ISBN 978-0-19-514769-8
- Barclay, Andy (24 November 2007), "Grand old dame", The Irish Times
- Coveney, Michael (7 September 2017), London Theatres, Frances Lincoln, ISBN 978-1-78101-235-2
- "Death of Mr. Michael Gunn", Advocate, Melbourne, Australia
- Dickson, David (1 May 2014), Dublin: The Making of a Capital City, Profile Books, ISBN 978-1-84765-056-6
- Goldthorpe, Liz (20 April 2020), Sir (Ambrose) Henry Webb, National Portrait Gallery
- Harty, John III (22 December 2015), James Joyce's Finnegans Wake: A Casebook, Routledge, ISBN 978-1-317-27351-6
- History (PDF), Gaiety Theatre
- Kenny, Aisling; Wollenberg, Susan (3 March 2016), Women and the Nineteenth-Century Lied, Taylor & Francis, ISBN 978-1-134-77387-9
- Kerins, Des (2009), The Gaiety Theatre, South King Street, Dublin, www.arthurlloyd.co.uk
- Litsios, Socrates, "A Theatrical Heritage", The Public Health Life and Times of Selskar Gunn
- McAsey, Carmel C. (December 1969), "Dubliners and Opera", Dublin Historical Record, 23 (2/3), Old Dublin Society: 45–55, JSTOR 30087165
- Mackenzie, Compton (1953), The Savoy Of London, George G Harrap & Co Ltd
- Seeley, Paul (2 January 2019), Richard D'Oyly Carte, Taylor & Francis, ISBN 978-1-351-04589-6
- "Selskar Michael Gunn", American Journal of Public Health, 34 (10), American Public Health Association: 1096–1097, October 1944, doi:10.2105/AJPH.34.10.1096, PMC 1625293, PMID 18016067
- Simkin, John (September 1997), George Dolby, Spartacus Educational Publishers
- Stone, David (2002), "Bessie Sudlow (1876)", The D'oyly Carte Opera Company
- "The Theatre Royal, Hawkins Street, Dublin - A History", Freeman's Journal, 3 March 1874 – via www.arthurlloyd.co.uk
