= Office of Foreign Relief and Rehabilitation Operations =

The Office of Foreign Relief and Rehabilitation Operations (OFRRO) was a short-lived organization created during World War II in the United States Department of State. It existed between December 1942 and November 1943, when it was replaced by the United Nations Relief and Rehabilitation Administration (UNRRA).

== History ==
The OFRRO was established in December 1942. It was one of the organizations set up to provide relief to populations suffering from the effects of the war, others being the British Committee on Surpluses, the Inter-Allied Committee on Post-War Requirements, established in September 1941 to estimate the extent of postwar needs and the Middle East Relief and Refugee Administration, which the British set up to operate refugee camps. President Franklin D. Roosevelt announced on 21 November 1942 that the OFRRO was being established with Herbert H. Lehman, the governor of New York State, as its director. Lehman took office on 4 December 1942. Roosevelt laid out the objectives in a letter of 11 December 1942, in which he wrote:

We also have another task, which will grow in magnitude as our striking power grows, and as new territories are liberated from the enemy's crushing grip. That task is to supply medicines, food, clothing and other dire needs of those peoples who have been plundered, despoiled and starved. The Nazis and Japanese have butchered innocent men and women in a campaign of organized terror. They have stripped the lands they hold of food and other resources. They have used hunger as an instrument of the slavery they seek to impose. Our policy is the direct opposite. United Nations' forces will bring food for the starving and medicine for the sick. Every aid possible will be given to restore each of the liberated countries to soundness and strength, so that each may make its full contribution to United Nations' victory and to the peace which follows.

The OFRRO took over the Department of State staff working on relief and rehabilitation problems. It also took over leadership of five inter-departmental committees on Food Relief, Agricultural Rehabilitation, Clothing Requirements and Supply, Health and Medical Requirements and Supply and Essential Services and Industries. In 1943 Selskar Gunn of the Rockefeller Foundation was secretary of Governor Lehman's committee to organize the OFRRO, creating plans that were used in the operations of its successor, the United Nations Relief and Rehabilitation Administration (UNRRA).

== Successor ==
On 17 June 1943 Lehman outlined the future tasks of the UNRRA, which the United Nations wanted to establish to organize relief, rehabilitation and supplies. On 9 November 1943 the 44 United and Associated Nations gathered at the White House to sign an agreement creating the United Nations Relief and Rehabilitation Administration (UNRRA), which took over from the earlier organizations. Lehman was the first head of the UNRRA.

== Sources ==
- Division of Public Information (1943), The Office of Foreign Relief and Rehabilitation Operations, Department of State, United States. Office of Foreign Relief and Rehabilitation Operations.
- Lehman, Herbert H. (17 June 1943), Address given by Herbert H. Lehman
- "Selskar Michael Gunn", American Journal of Public Health, 34 (10), American Public Health Association: 1096–1097, October 1944, doi:10.2105/AJPH.34.10.1096, PMC 1625293, PMID 18016067
- United Nations Relief and Rehabilitation Administration records, 1943-1949, Columbia University Libraries
- Woodward, Ellen S. (November 1944), "UNRRA— A Democratic Plan for International Relief" (PDF), Social Security Bulletin
