= Grecian bend =

Posture named for figures in the art of ancient Greece

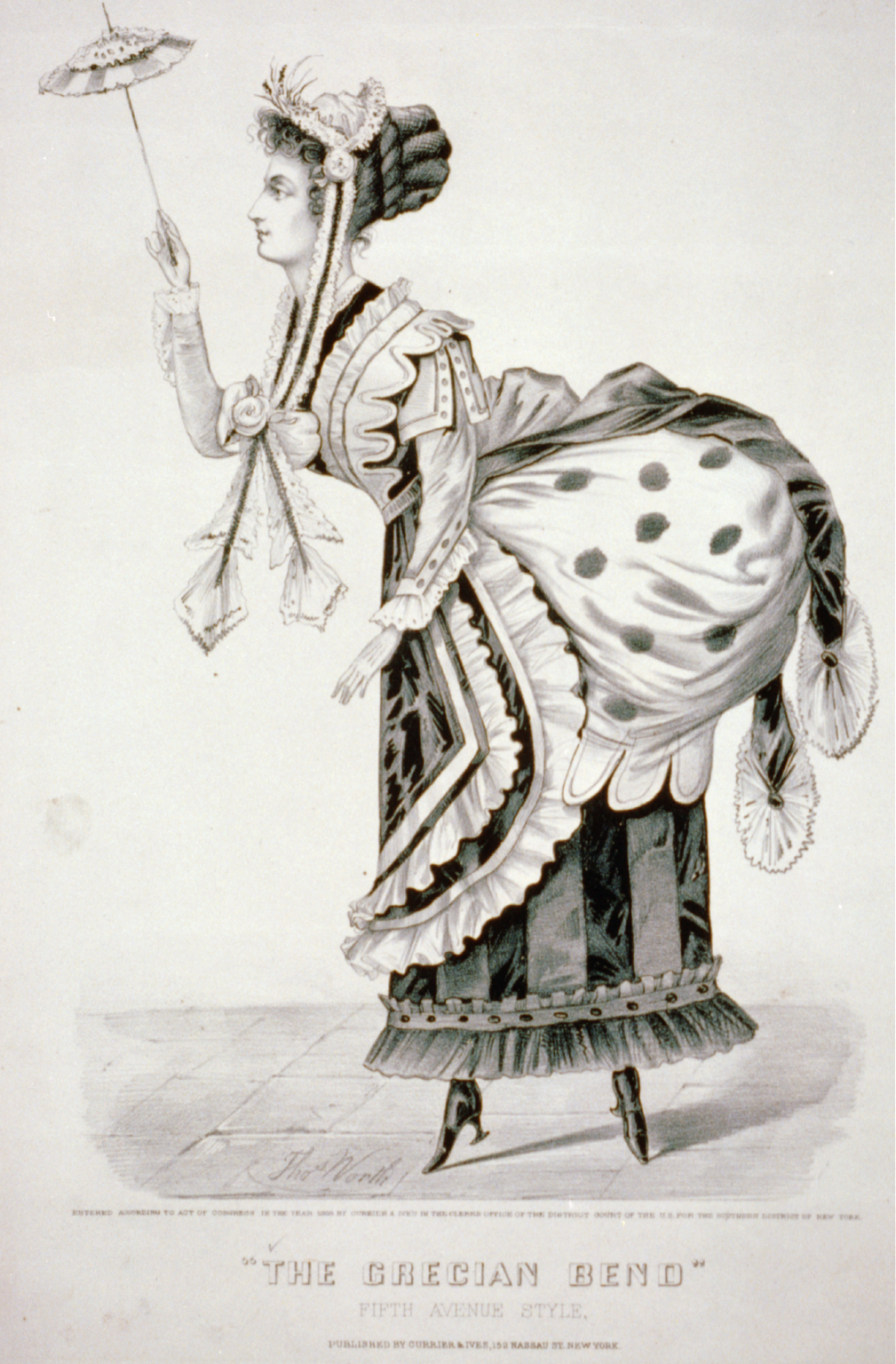
An 1868 lithograph caricaturing a woman with a Grecian bend.

The Grecian bend was a term applied first to a stooped posture which became fashionable c. 1820, named after the gracefully-inclined figures seen in the art of ancient Greece. It was also the name of a dance move introduced to polite society in America just before the American Civil War. The "bend" was considered very daring at the time.

The stoop or the silhouette created by the fashion in women's dress for corsets, crinolettes and bustles by 1869 was also called the Grecian bend. Contemporary illustrations often show a woman with a large bustle and a very small parasol, bending forward. The Grecian bend imitates the Lordosis behavior in many animals.

The term was also given to those who suffered from decompression sickness, or "the bends", due to working in caissons during the building of the Brooklyn Bridge in New York City. The name was given because afflicted individuals characteristically arched their backs in the same manner as the then popular "Grecian bend" fashion.

== Appearance in popular music ==
There were many songs published with "Grecian Bend" in their titles. The term "Grecian bend" appears in the song "The Garden Where The Praties Grow" by Johnny Patterson:

Have you ever been in love my boys
Or have you felt the pain?
I'd sooner be in jail myself
Than be in love again
For the girl I loved was beautiful
I'd have you all to know
And I met her in the garden
Where the praties grow

She was just the sort of creature boys
That Nature did intend
To walk right through the world my boys
Without the Grecian bend
Nor did she wear a chignon
I'd have you all to know
And I met her in the garden
Where the praties grow
