= Gaiety Theatre, Dublin =

Historic theatre in Dublin, Ireland

Gaiety Theatre
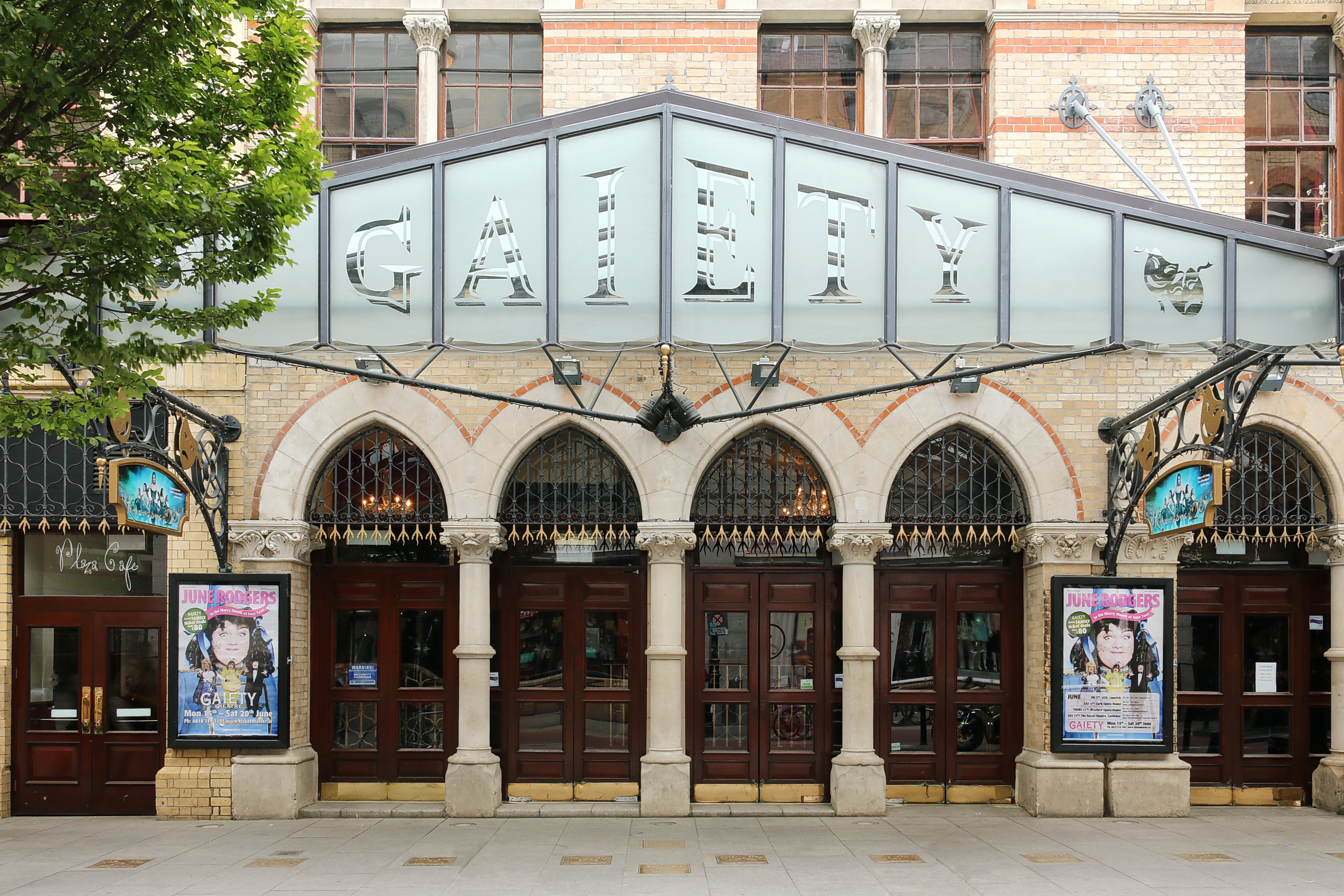
- Interactive map of Gaiety Theatre
- Address: South King Street; Dublin; Ireland
- Coordinates: 53.340312°N 6.261601°W
- Capacity: 1,145 (on three levels)

Construction
- Opened: 27 November 1871
- Architect: Charles J. Phipps

Website
- GaietyTheatre.ie

The Gaiety Theatre is a theatre on South King Street in Dublin, Ireland, off Grafton Street and close to St. Stephen's Green. It specialises in operatic and musical productions, with occasional dramatic shows.

== History ==
In April 1871, the brothers John and Michael Gunn obtained a 21-year licence to establish "a well-regulated theatre and therein at all times publicly to act, represent or perform any interlude, tragedy, comedy, prelude, opera, burletta, play, farce or pantomime". In favour of the Gunn's licence application was that, unlike the existing theatres, they were not proposing to promote local drama which had acquired something of a reputation with the Dublin Castle administration for stirring up nationalist sentiments.

The city centre site was 17 metres wide on King Street and 42 metres deep towards Tangier Lane. The Gunns employed the experienced theatre architect C.J. Phipps. One of the theatres Phipps had recently completed in 1868 in London was the Gaiety and its name and auditorium layout were adopted for the new theatre in Dublin. The audience capacity was 2000 spread over four floors: the 'parterre' or ground floor pit with 21 rows of seats; the dress circle and upper circle comprising: balcony stalls with 7 rows of seats, the first circle with 6 rows of seats, the amphitheater with 2 rows of seats; and the top floor gallery with 9 rows of seats; plus 14 private boxes. Each class of seats was accessed via its own entrance and stairway. There was a smoking balcony, bars on each floor and a tea-room. The design included tip-up seats (an innovative way of increasing the audience capacity) and fire-safety features such as a 4" water main (for firefighting) and stone (not wooden) staircases. Back stage: the theatre was radically different from others in Ireland. From the outset the Gunns decided that their new theatre would be a 'receiving house': that is, it would receive touring companies and would not have its own company of actors or a repertory programme: As a receiving house, there was no need for extensive rehearsal spaces, workshops or storage areas.

The theatre was built for £26,000, and construction was completed in just 28 weeks. The Gaiety was opened on 27 November 1871, with the Lord Lieutenant of Ireland as guest of honour for a double bill which included the comedy She Stoops to Conquer and a burlesque version of La Belle Sauvage.

The Gaiety was extended by theatre architect Frank Matcham in 1883, and, despite several improvements to public spaces and stage changes, it retains several Victorian era features and remains Dublin's longest-established, continuously producing theatre.

Patrick Wall and Louis Elliman bought the theatre in 1936 and ran it for several decades with local actors and actresses. They sold it in 1965, and in the 1960s and the 1970s the theatre was run by Fred O'Donovan and the Eamonn Andrews Studios, until - in the 1980s - Joe Dowling (former artistic director of the Abbey Theatre) became director of the Gaiety. In the 1990s, Groundwork Productions took on the lease and the theatre was eventually bought by the Break for the Border Group. The Gaiety was purchased by music promoters MCD (in turn owned by Denis Desmond and his wife Caroline) in the late 1990s. The new owners undertook a refit of the theatre, with the Department of Arts, Sport and Tourism contributing to the restoration fund.

== Use ==
Performers and playwrights associated with the theatre have been celebrated with hand-prints cast in bronze and set in the pavement beneath the theatre canopy. These handprints include those of Luciano Pavarotti, Brendan Grace, Maureen Potter, Twink, John B Keane, Anna Manahan, Niall Toibin and Brian Friel.

The theatre played host to the 1971 Eurovision Song Contest, the first to be staged in Ireland, during the Gaiety's centenary year. Clodagh Rodgers (a contestant in that particular contest) later presented her RTÉ TV series The Clodagh Rodgers Show from the theatre in the late 1970s.

Bob Hewson, the father of U2 lead singer Paul "Bono" Hewson, was a tenor who performed at the Gaiety with the Rathmines and Rathgar Musical Society. In December 2004, U2 filmed a music video for "Sometimes You Can't Make It On Your Own" at the Gaiety. Both the song and the video are tributes from son to father.

The Gaiety is known for its annual Christmas pantomime and has hosted a pantomime every year since December 1873, though no production was possible in 2020 due to the COVID-19 crisis, with the scheduled panto, The Little Mermaid postponed until 2021. Actor and director Alan Stanford directed both Gaiety productions of Snow White and Sleeping Beauty. Irish entertainer June Rodgers starred in the Gaiety pantomime for years, until she began to headline the equally established Olympia Theatre panto. The Gaiety's pantomimes have included Irish performers that appeal to homegrown audiences, including a number of Fair City actors.

| Preceded by RAI Congrescentrum; Amsterdam | Eurovision Song Contest; Venue; 1971 | Succeeded by Usher Hall; Edinburgh |
