= List of awards and honours received by Julius Nyerere =

This is a comprehensive list of awards, honours and other recognitions bestowed on Julius Nyerere.

Nyerere was a Tanzanian anti-colonial activist, politician, and political theorist. He governed Tanganyika as prime minister from 1961 to 1962 and then as president from 1962 to 1964, after which he led its successor state, Tanzania, as president from 1964 to 1985. He was a founding member and chair of the Tanganyika African National Union (TANU) party, and of its successor Chama Cha Mapinduzi, from 1954 to 1990. Ideologically an African nationalist and African socialist, he was a controversial figure. Across Africa he gained widespread respect as an anti-colonialist and in power received praise for ensuring that, unlike many of its neighbours, Tanzania remained stable and unified in the decades following independence.

He is held in deep respect within Tanzania, where he is often referred to by the Swahili honorific Mwalimu ("teacher") and described as the "Father of the Nation."

== Honours ==
=== Foreign honours ===
Year	Date	Country	Order
1970	27 January 1970	Yugoslavia	Order of the Yugoslav Great Star
1974	21 September 1974	Cuba	Order of José Martí.
1975	24 April 1975	Mexico	Order of the Aztec Eagle, Collar
1976		Guinea-Bissau	Medal of Amílcar Cabral
1983		Mozambique	Order of Eduardo Mondlane
1985		Angola	Order of Augstino Neto
1986		SADC	Sir Seretse Khama Medal
1986	7 September 1987	Soviet Union	Lenin Peace Prize
2004	16 June 2004	South Africa	Order of the Companions of O. R. Tambo
2005		Zimbabwe	Royal Order of Munhumutapa
2007	10 July 2007	Uganda	Most Excellent Order of the Pearl of Africa (Grand Master)
2007	10 July 2007	Uganda	Order of Katonga
2009	6 July 2009	Rwanda	National Liberation Medal
2009	6 July 2009	Rwanda	Campaign Against Genocide Medal
2010		Namibia	Order of the Welwitschia
2012		Burundi	National Order of the Republic (Grand Cordon)
		Jamaica	Order of Jamaica

=== Domestic honours ===
Year	Date	Country	Order
2011	9 December 2011	Tanzania	Order of Mwalimu Julius Kambarage Nyerere

== Scholastic ==
=== Honorary academic awards ===
Year	University	Country	Honour
1960	Duquesne University	United States	Doctor of Laws
1962	University of Edinburgh	Scotland	Doctor of Laws
1967	Cairo University	United Arab Republic	Honoris Causa
1969	University of Toronto	Canada	Doctor of Laws
	University of Nigeria Nsukka	Nigeria	
1976	University of Ibadan	Nigeria	Doctor of Laws
	University of Monrovia	Liberia	
1977	Harvard University	United States	Doctor of Humanities
1977	Howard University	United States	Doctor of Humanities
1985	University of Ljubljana	Yugoslavia	Doctor of Laws
1985	Pyongyang University	North Korea	Doctor of Philosophy
1985	Ikulu (State House)	Tanzania	Degree for Diplomacy
1985	University of Havana	Cuba	Doctor of Philosophy
1986	University of Zimbabwe	Zimbabwe	Doctor of Laws
1986	University of Dar es Salaam	Tanzania	Degree of Literature
1987	National University of Lesotho	Lesotho	Doctor of Laws
1991	University of the Philippines	Philippines	Doctor of Humanities
1993	Makerere University	Uganda	Doctor of Laws
1997	Open University of Tanzania	Tanzania	Doctor of Letters
1997	Claremont Graduate University	United States	Doctor of Laws
1997	Sokoine University of Agriculture	Tanzania	Honoris Causa
1998	University of Fort Hare	South Africa	Doctor of Laws
1998	Lincoln University	United States	Doctor of Laws

== Awards ==
- 1973, Jawaharlal Nehru Award, Nehru Award for International Understanding, India.
- 1982, Third World Prize, India
- 1983, Nansen Refugee Award, UNHCR
- 1988, Joliot-Curie gold medal, World Peace Council.
- 1992, International Simón Bolívar Prize, UNESCO.
- 1994, TANAPA / Gold Medal of Outstanding on Wildlife and Environmental Conservation, Tanzania.
- 1995, Gandhi Peace Prize, India.
- 1997, Nnamdi Azikiwe Award, Nigeria.
- 2000, Statesman of the Century, CCM, Tanzania.
