= Julius Nyerere =

President of Tanzania from 1964 to 1985

Servant of God Julius Nyerere MEOPA
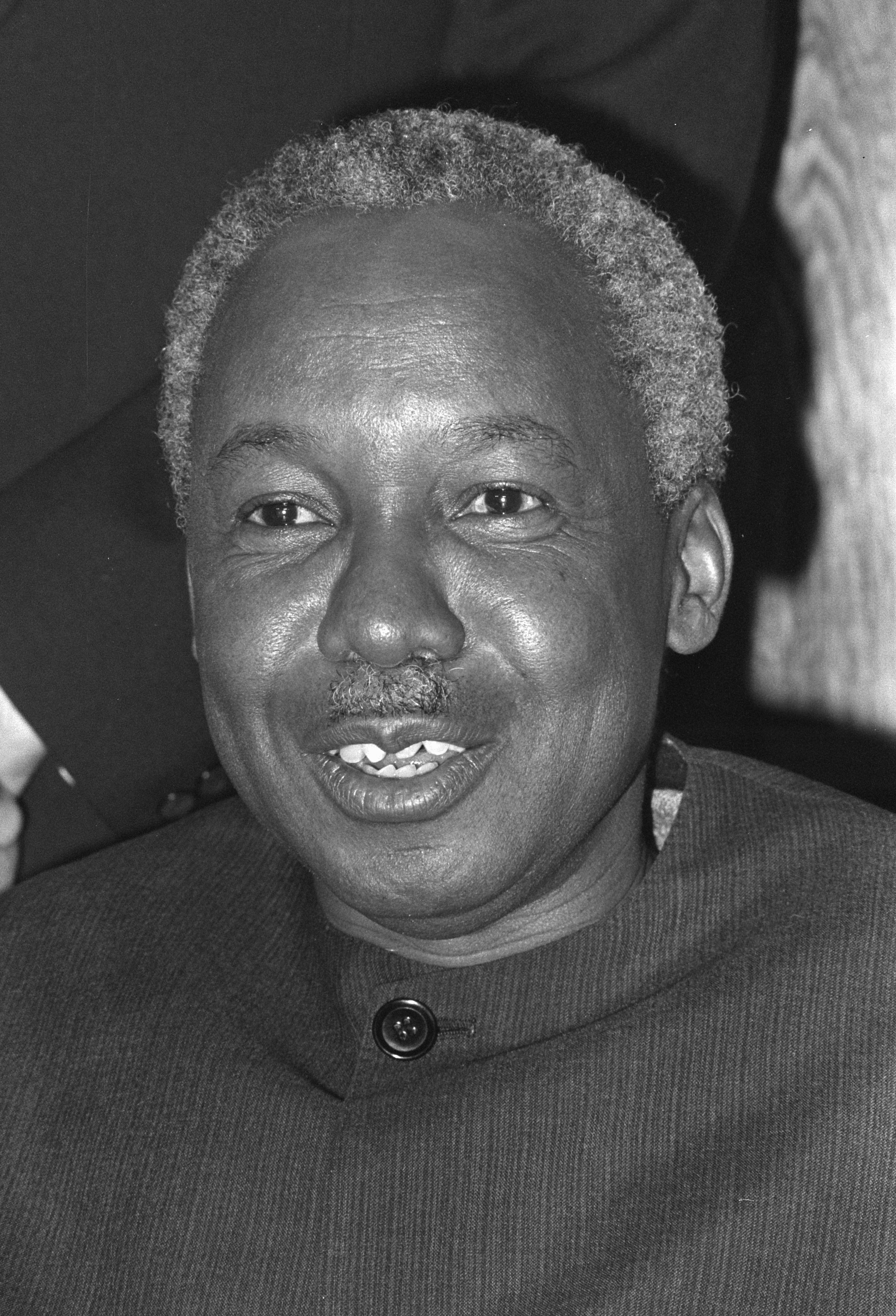
- Nyerere in 1975

1st President of Tanzania
- In office 29 October 1964 – 5 November 1985
- Prime Minister: Rashidi Kawawa; Edward Sokoine; Cleopa Msuya; Edward Sokoine; Salim Ahmed Salim
- Vice President: First Vice President; Abeid Amani Karume; Aboud Jumbe; Ali Hassan Mwinyi; Second Vice President; Rashidi Kawawa
- Preceded by: Himself as President of the United Republic of Tanganyika and Zanzibar
- Succeeded by: Ali Hassan Mwinyi

President of the United Republic of Tanganyika and Zanzibar
- In office 26 April 1964 – 29 October 1964
- Vice President: Abeid Karume (First); Rashidi Kawawa (Second)
- Preceded by: Himself as President of Tanganyika; Abeid Karume as President of the People's Republic of Zanzibar and Pemba
- Succeeded by: Himself as President of Tanzania

President of Tanganyika
- In office 9 December 1962 – 26 April 1964
- Prime Minister: Rashidi Kawawa
- Preceded by: Elizabeth II as Queen of Tanganyika
- Succeeded by: Himself as President of the United Republic of Tanganyika and Zanzibar

Prime Minister of Tanganyika
- In office 1 May 1961 – 22 January 1962
- Monarch: Elizabeth II
- Governor-General: Sir Richard Trumbull
- Preceded by: Himself (as Chief Minister)
- Succeeded by: Rashidi Kawawa

Chief Minister of Tanganyika
- In office 2 September 1960 – 1 May 1961
- Monarch: Elizabeth II
- Governor: Sir Richard Turnbull
- Preceded by: Position established
- Succeeded by: Himself (as Prime Minister)

Personal details
- Born: Kambarage Nyerere; 13 April 1922 Butiama, Mara Region, Tanganyika Territory
- Died: 14 October 1999 (aged 77) London, England
- Resting place: Butiama, Mara Region, Tanzania
- Party: CCM (1977–1999); TANU (1954–1977)
- Spouse: Maria Magige (m. 1953)
- Children: 8: Andrew Burito; Anna Watiku; Anselm Magige; John Guido (1957–2015); Charles Makongoro (b. 1959); Godfrey Madaraka; Rosemary Nyerere (1961–2021); Pauleta Nyabanane
- Education: University of Fort Hare; Makerere University (DipEd); University of Edinburgh (MA)
- Profession: Teacher
- Awards: Lenin Peace Prize; Gandhi Peace Prize; Joliot-Curie Medal

Julius Kambarage Nyerere (Swahili: [ˈdʒulius kɑᵐbɑˈɾɑɠɛ ɲɛˈɾɛɾɛ]; 13 April 1922 – 14 October 1999) was a Tanzanian politician, anti-colonial activist, revolutionary and political theorist. He governed Tanganyika as prime minister from 1961 to 1962 and then as president from 1962 to 1964, after which he led its successor state, Tanzania, as president from 1964 to 1985. He was a founding member and chair of the Tanganyika African National Union (TANU) party and of its successor, Chama Cha Mapinduzi, from 1954 to 1990. Ideologically an African nationalist and African socialist, he promoted a political philosophy known as Ujamaa.

Born in Butiama, then in the British colony of Tanganyika, Nyerere was the son of a Zanaki chief. He studied at Makerere College in Uganda and then Edinburgh University in Scotland. In 1952 he returned to Tanganyika, married, and worked as a school teacher. In 1954, he helped form TANU, through which he campaigned for Tanganyikan independence. Influenced by the Indian independence leader Mahatma Gandhi, Nyerere preached non-violent protest. Elected to the Legislative Council in the 1958–1959 elections, Nyerere then led TANU to victory at the 1960 general election, becoming prime minister. Negotiations with the British authorities resulted in independence in 1961. In 1962, Tanganyika became a republic, with Nyerere elected as its first president. His administration pursued decolonisation and the "Africanisation" of the civil service while promoting unity between indigenous Africans and the country's Asian and European minorities. He encouraged the formation of a one-party state and unsuccessfully pursued the Pan-Africanist formation of an East African Federation with Uganda and Kenya. A 1963 mutiny within the army was suppressed with British assistance.

Following the Zanzibar Revolution of 1964, Zanzibar was unified with Tanganyika to form Tanzania. Nyerere placed a growing emphasis on national self-reliance and socialism, developing close links with Mao Zedong's China. In 1967, Nyerere issued the Arusha Declaration which outlined his vision of Ujamaa. Banks and other major industries and companies were nationalized; education and healthcare were significantly expanded. Renewed emphasis was placed on agricultural development through the formation of communal farms, although these reforms hampered food production and left areas dependent on food aid. His government provided training and aid to anti-colonialist groups fighting white-minority rule throughout southern Africa and oversaw Tanzania's 1978–1979 war with Uganda which resulted in the overthrow of Ugandan President Idi Amin. In 1985, Nyerere stood down and was succeeded by Ali Hassan Mwinyi, who reversed many of Nyerere's policies. He remained chair of Chama Cha Mapinduzi until 1990, supporting a transition to a multi-party system, and later served as mediator in attempts to end the Burundian Civil War.

Nyerere was a controversial figure. Across Africa he gained widespread respect as an anti-colonialist and in power received praise for ensuring that, unlike many of its neighbours, Tanzania remained stable and unified in the decades following independence. His construction of the one-party state and use of detention without trial led to accusations of dictatorial governance, while he has also been blamed for economic mismanagement. He is held in deep respect within Tanzania, where he is described as the "Father of the Nation".

== Early life ==
=== Childhood: 1922–1934 ===
Julius Kambarage Nyerere was born on 13 April 1922 in Mwitongo, an area of the village of Butiama in Tanganyika's Mara Region. (Note: Nyerere was not aware of his date of birth for much of his life; he claimed that he was born in February 1921 for at least his first twenty-five years. He discovered his actual date of birth in the late 1960s, when it was revealed that a local elder, Mtokambali Bukiri, had made a note of it in his medical records for the community.) He was one of 25 surviving children of Nyerere Burito, the chief of the Zanaki people. Burito had been born in 1860 and given the name "Nyerere" ("caterpillar" in Zanaki) after a plague of worm caterpillars infested the local area at the time of his birth. Burito had been appointed chief in 1915, installed in that position by the German imperial administrators of what was then German East Africa; his position was also endorsed by the incoming British imperial administration. Burito had 22 wives, of whom Julius' mother, Mugaya Nyang'ombe, was the fifth. She had been born in 1892 and had married the chief in 1907, when she was fifteen. Mugaya bore Burito four sons and four daughters, of which Nyerere was the second child; two of his siblings died in infancy.

These wives lived in various huts around Burito's cattle corral, in the centre of which was his roundhouse. The Zanaki were one of the smallest of the 120 tribes in the British colony and were then sub-divided among eight chiefdoms; they would only be united under the kingship of Chief Wanzagi Nyerere, Burito's half-brother, in the 1960s. Nyerere's clan were the Abhakibhweege. At birth, Nyerere was given the personal name "Mugendi" ("Walker" in Zanaki) but this was soon changed to "Kambarage", the name of a female rain spirit, at the advice of a omugabhu diviner. Nyerere was raised into the polytheistic belief system of the Zanaki, and lived at his mother's house, assisting in the farming of the millet, maize and cassava. With other local boys he also took part in the herding of goats and cattle. At some point he underwent the Zanaki's traditional circumcision ritual at Gabizuryo. As the son of a chief he was exposed to African-administered power and authority, and living in the compound gave him an appreciation for communal living that would influence his later political ideas.

=== Schooling: 1934–1942 ===
The British colonial administration encouraged the education of chiefs' sons, believing that this would help to perpetuate the chieftain system and prevent the development of a separate educated indigenous elite who might challenge colonial governance. At his father's prompting, Nyerere began his education at the Native Administration School in Mwisenge, Musoma in February 1934, about 35 km from his home. This placed him in a privileged position; most of his contemporaries at Butiama could not afford a primary education. His education was in Swahili, a language he had to learn while there. Nyerere excelled at the school, and after six months his exam results were such that he was allowed to skip a grade. He avoided sporting activities and preferred to read in his dormitory during free time.

While at the school he also underwent the Zanaki tooth filing ritual to have his upper-front teeth sharpened into triangular points. It may have been at this point that he took up smoking, a habit he retained for several decades. He also began to take an interest in Roman Catholicism, although was initially concerned about abandoning the veneration of his people's traditional gods. With school friend Mang'ombe Marwa, Nyerere trekked 14 miles to the Nyegina Mission Centre, run by the White Fathers, to learn more about the Christian religion; although Marwa eventually stopped, Nyerere continued. His elementary schooling ended in 1936; his final exam results were the highest of any pupil in the Lake Province and Western Province region.

His academic excellence allowed him to gain a government scholarship to attend the elite Tabora Government School, a secondary school in Tabora. There, he again avoided sporting activities but helped to set up a Boy Scout's brigade after reading Scouting for Boys. Fellow pupils later remembered him as being ambitious and competitive, eager to come top of the class in examinations. He used books in the school library to advance his knowledge of the English language to a high standard. He was heavily involved in the school's debating society, and teachers recommended him as head prefect, but this was vetoed by the headmaster, who described Nyerere as being "too kind" for the position. In keeping with Zanaki custom, Nyerere entered into an arranged marriage with a girl named Magori Watiha, who was then only three or four years old but had been selected for him by his father. At the time they continued to live apart. In March 1942, during Nyerere's final year at Tabora, his father died; the school refused his request to return home for the funeral. Nyerere's brother, Edward Wanzagi Nyerere, was appointed as their father's successor. Nyerere then decided to be baptised as a Roman Catholic; at his baptism, he took on the name "Julius", although later stated that it was "silly" that Catholics should "take a name other than a tribal name" on baptism.

=== Makerere College, Uganda: 1943–1947 ===
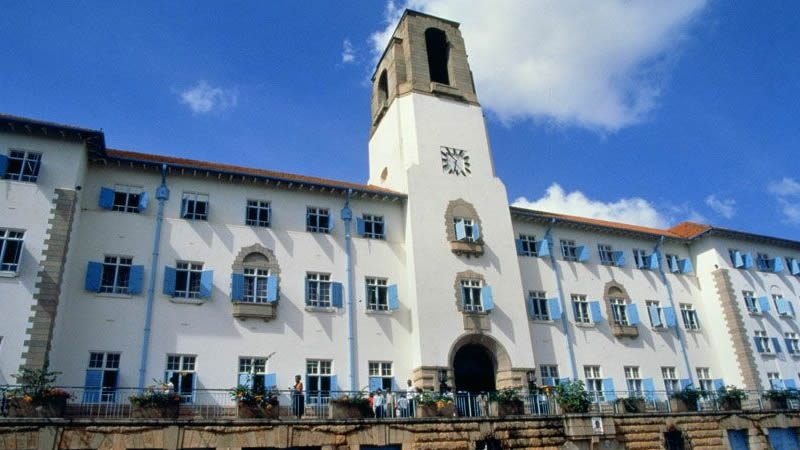
The main building at Makerere University in Uganda, where Nyerere studied a teacher training course

In October 1941, Nyerere completed his secondary education and decided to study at Makerere College in the Ugandan city of Kampala. He secured a bursary to fund a teacher training course there, arriving in Uganda in January 1943. At Makerere, he studied alongside many of East Africa's most talented students, although spent little time socialising with others, instead focusing on his reading. He took courses in chemistry, biology, Latin, and Greek. Deepening his Catholicism, he studied the Papal Encyclicals and read the work of Catholic philosophers like Jacques Maritain; most influential however were the writings of the liberal British philosopher John Stuart Mill. He won a literary competition with an essay on the subjugation of women, for which he had applied Mill's ideas to Zanaki society. Nyerere was also an active member of the Makerere Debating Society, and established a branch of Catholic Action at the university.

In July 1943, he wrote a letter to the Tanganyika Standard in which he discussed the ongoing Second World War and argued that capitalism was alien to Africa and that the continent should turn to "African socialism". His letter went on to state that "the educated African should take the lead" in moving the population towards a more explicitly socialist model. Molony thought that the letter "serves to mark the beginnings of Nyerere's political maturation, chiefly in absorbing and developing the views of leading black thinkers of the time." In 1943, Nyerere, Andrew Tibandebage, and Hamza Kibwana Bakari Mwapachu founded the Tanganyika African Welfare Association (TAWA) to assist the small number of Tanganyikan students at Makerere. TAWA was allowed to die off, and in its place Nyerere revived the largely moribund Makerere chapter of the Tanganyika African Association (TAA), although this too had ceased functioning by 1947. Although aware of racial prejudice from the white colonial minority, he insisted on treating people as individuals, recognising that many white individuals were not bigoted towards indigenous Africans. After three years, Nyerere graduated from Makerere with a diploma in education.

=== Early teaching: 1947–1949 ===
On leaving Makerere, Nyerere returned home to Zanaki territory to build a house for his widowed mother, before spending his time reading and farming in Butiama. He was offered teaching positions at both the state-run Tabora Boys' School and the mission-run St Mary's, but chose the latter despite it offering a lower wage. He took part in a public debate with two teachers from the Tabora Boys' School, in which he argued against the statement that "The African has benefitted more than the European since the partition of Africa"; after winning the debate, he was subsequently banned from returning to the school. Outside school hours, he gave free lessons in English to older locals, and also gave talks on political issues. He also worked briefly as a price inspector for the government, going into stores to check what they were charging, although quit the position after the authorities ignored his reports about false pricing. While in Tabora, the woman whom Nyerere was arranged to marry, Magori Watiha, was sent to live with him to pursue her primary education there, although he forwarded her to live with his mother. Instead, he began courting Maria Gabriel, a teacher at Nyegina Primary School in Musoma; although from the Simbiti tribe, she shared with Nyerere a devout Catholicism. He proposed marriage to her and they became informally engaged at Christmas 1948.

In Tabora, he intensified his political activities, joining the local branch of the TAA and becoming its treasurer. The branch opened a co-operative shop selling basic goods like sugar, flour, and soap. In April 1946 he attended the organisation's conference in Dar es Salaam, where the TAA officially declared itself committed to supporting independence for Tanganyika. With Tibandebage he worked on rewriting the TAA's constitution and used the group to mobilise opposition to Colonial Paper 210 in the district, believing that the electoral reform was designed to further privilege the white minority. At St Mary's, Father Richard Walsh—an Irish priest who was director of the school—encouraged Nyerere to consider additional education in the United Kingdom. Walsh convinced Nyerere to take the University of London's matriculation examination, which he passed with second division in January 1948. He applied for funding from the Colonial Development and Welfare Scheme and was initially unsuccessful, although succeeded on his second attempt, in 1949. He agreed to study abroad, although expressed some reluctance because it meant that he would no longer be able to provide for his mother and siblings.

=== Edinburgh University: 1949–1952 ===
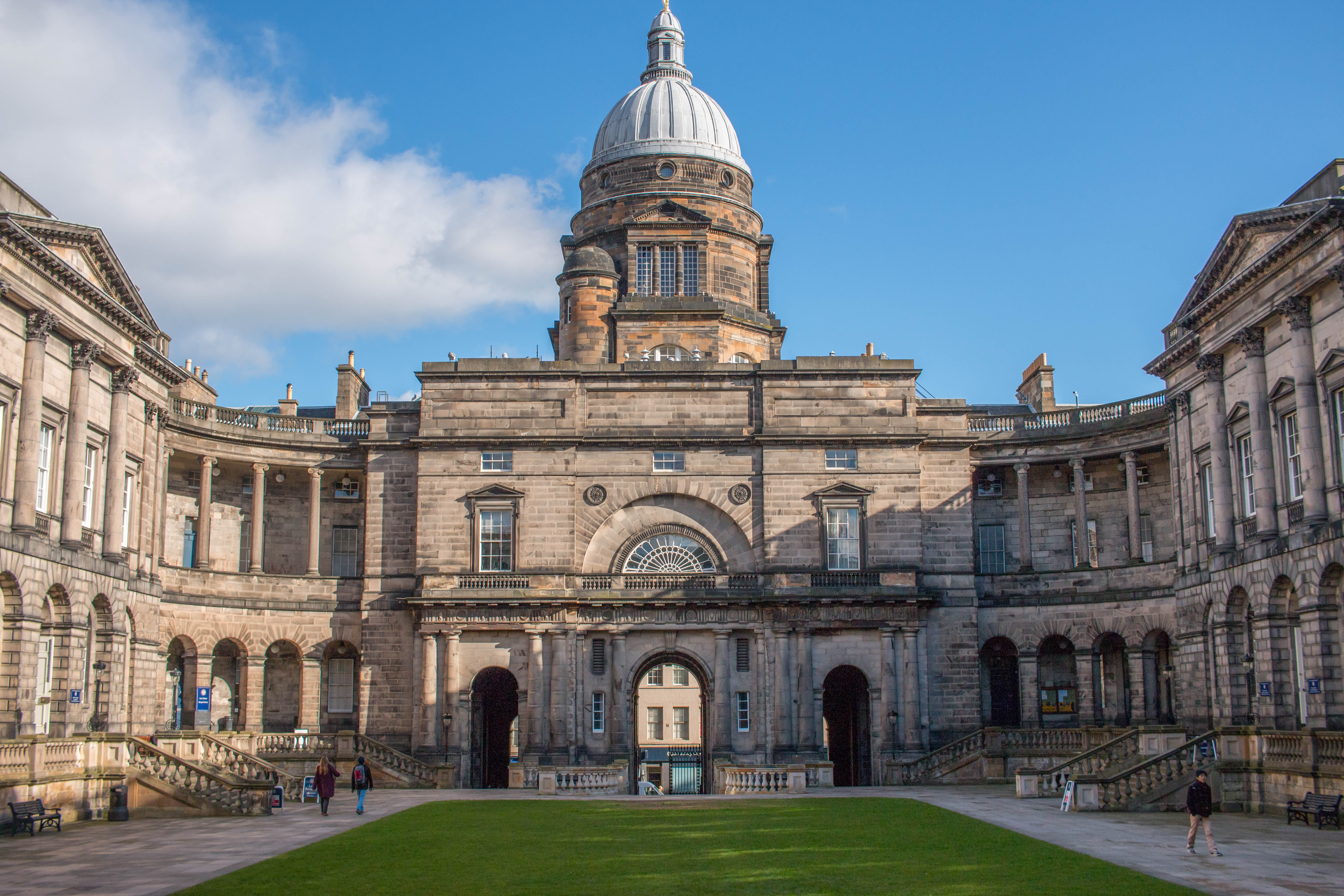
The Old College in Edinburgh

In April 1949, Nyerere flew from Dar es Salaam to Southampton, England. He then travelled, by train, from London to Edinburgh. In the city, Nyerere took lodgings in a building for "colonial persons" in The Grange suburb. Starting his studies at the University of Edinburgh, he began with a short course in chemistry and physics and also passed Higher English in the Scottish Universities Preliminary Examination. In October 1949 he was accepted for entry to study for a Master of Arts degree at the University of Edinburgh's Faculty of Arts; his was an Ordinary Degree of Master of Arts, which was considered an undergraduate degree, the equivalent of a Bachelor of Arts in most English universities.

In 1949, Nyerere was one of only two black students from the British East African territories studying in Scotland. In the first year of his MA studies, he took courses in English literature, political economy, and social anthropology; in the latter, he was tutored by Ralph Piddington. In the second, he selected courses in economic history and British history, the latter taught by Richard Pares, whom Nyerere later described as "a wise man who taught me very much about what makes these British tick". In the third year, he took the constitutional law course run by Lawrence Saunders and moral philosophy. Although his grades were not outstanding, they enabled him to pass all of his courses. His tutor in moral philosophy described him as "a bright and lively member of the class and of the parties".

Nyerere gained many friends in Edinburgh, and socialised with Nigerians and West Indians living in the city. There are no reports of Nyerere experiencing racial prejudice while in Scotland; although it is possible he did encounter it, many black students in Britain at the time reported that white British students were generally less prejudiced than other sectors of the population. In classes, he was generally treated as the equal of his white fellows, which gave him additional confidence, and may have help mould his belief in multi-racialism. During his time in Edinburgh, he may have engaged in part-time work to support himself and family in Tanganyika; he and other students went on a working holiday to a Welsh farm where they engaged in potato picking. In 1951, he travelled down to London to meet with other Tanganyikan students and attend the Festival of Britain. That same year, he co-wrote an article for The Student magazine in which he criticised plans to incorporate Tanganyika into the Federation of Rhodesia and Nyasaland, which he and co-author John Keto noted was designed to further white minority control in the region. In February 1952, he attended a meeting on the issue of the Federation that was organised by the World Church Group; among those speaking at the meeting was the medical student—and future Malawian leader—Hastings Banda. In July 1952, Nyerere graduated from the university with an Ordinary Degree of Master of Arts. Leaving Edinburgh that week, he was granted a short British Council Visitorship to study educational institutions in England, basing himself in London.

== Political activism ==
=== Founding the Tanganyika African National Union: 1952–1955 ===
Having sailed aboard the SS Kenya Castle, Nyerere arrived back in Dar es Salaam in October 1952. He took the train to Mwanza and then a lake steamer to Musoma before reaching Zanaki lands. There, he built a mud-brick house for himself and his fiancé, Maria; they were married at Musoma mission on 24 January 1953. They soon moved to Pugu, closer to Dar es Salaam, when Nyerere was hired to teach history at St Francis' College, one of the leading schools for indigenous Africans in Tanganyika. In 1953 the couple had their first child, Andrew. Nyerere became increasingly involved in politics; in April 1953, he was elected president of the Tanganyika African Association (TAA). His ability to take on the position was influenced by his good oratorical skills and by the fact that he was Zanaki; had he been from one of the larger ethnic groups he may have faced greater opposition from members of rival tribes. Under Nyerere, the TAA gained an increasingly political dimension, devoted to the pursuit of Tanganyikan independence from the British Empire. Nyerere himself was, according to Bjerk, "catapulted to prominence" as "a standard-bearer of the burgeoning independence movement".

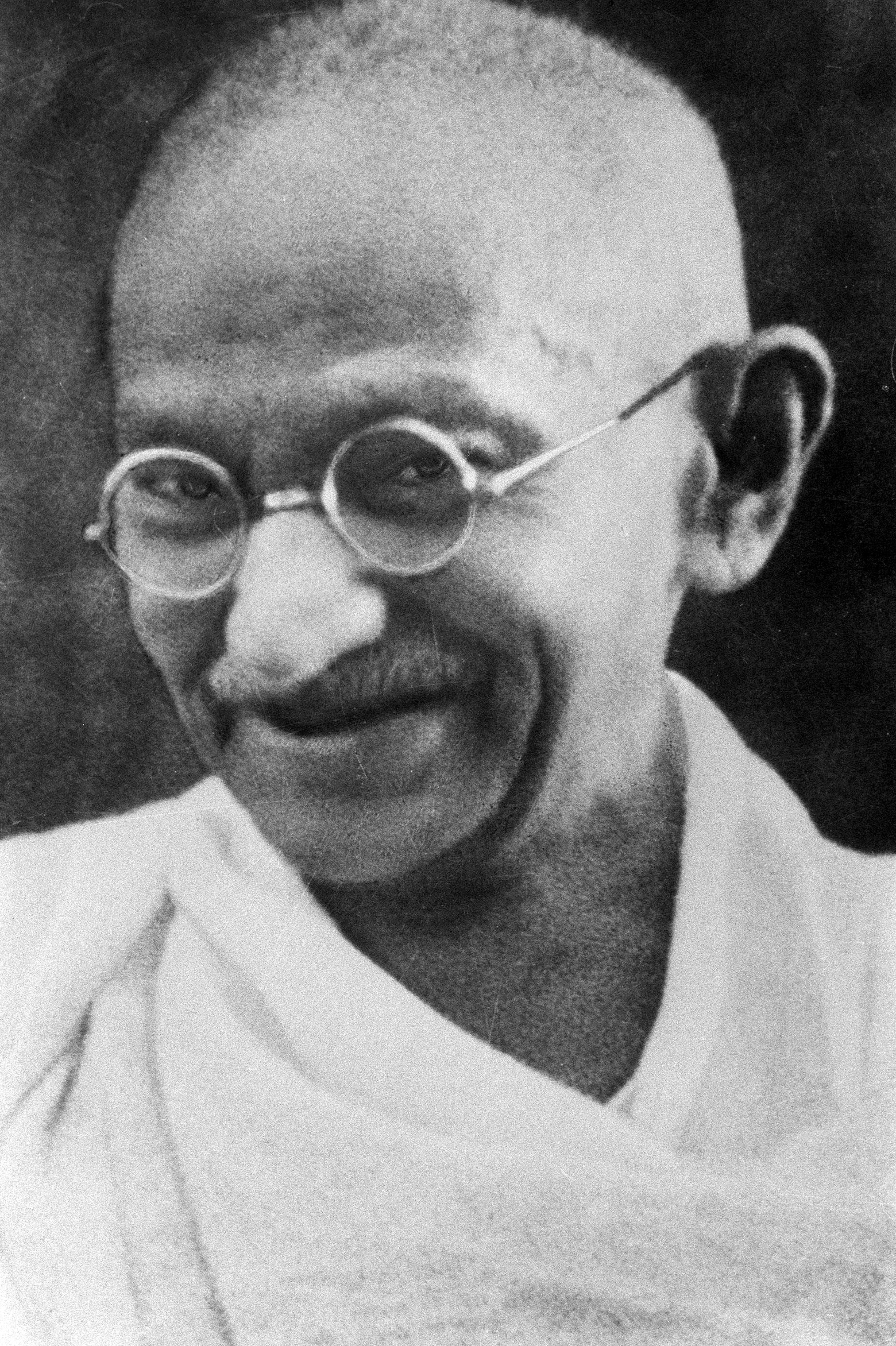
In campaigning for Tanganyikan independence using non-violent methods, Nyerere was inspired by the example of Indian independence leader Mahatma Gandhi.

On 7 July 1954 Nyerere, assisted by Oscar Kambona, transformed the TAA into a new political party, the Tanganyika African National Union (TANU). Among the early TANU members were the three sons of Kleist Sykes, Dossa Aziz, and John Rupia, the latter an entrepreneur who had established himself as one of the wealthiest indigenous Africans in the country. Rupia served as the group's first treasurer and largely funded the organisation in its early years. The colony's governor appointed Nyerere to fill a temporary vacancy on its legislative council generated after David Makwaia was sent to London to serve on the Royal Commission for Land and Population Problems. His first speech at the legislative council dealt with the need for more schools in the country. When he said that he would oppose proposed government regulations to raise salaries for civil servants, the government recalled Makwaia from London to ensure Nyerere's removal.

At TANU meetings, Nyerere insisted on the need for Tanganyikan independence, but maintained that the country's European and Asian minorities would not be ejected by an African-led independent government. He greatly admired the Indian independence leader Mahatma Gandhi and endorsed Gandhi's approach to attaining independence through non-violent protest. The colonial government closely monitored his activities; they had concerns that Nyerere would instigate a violent anti-colonial rebellion akin to the Mau Mau Uprising in neighbouring Kenya.

In August 1954, the United Nations had sent a mission to Tanganyika which subsequently published a report recommending a twenty to twenty-five year timetable for the colony's independence. The UN was set to discuss the issue further at a trusteeship council in New York City, with TANU sending Nyerere to be its representative there. At the British government's request, the United States agreed to prevent Nyerere staying for more than 24 hours before the meeting or moving outside an eight-block radius of the UN headquarters. Nyerere arrived in the city in March 1955, as part of a trip funded largely by Rupia. To the trusteeship council he said that: "with your help and with the help of the [British] Administering Authority we would be governing ourselves long before twenty to twenty-five years." This seemed highly ambitious to everyone at the time.

The government pressured Nyerere's employer to sack him because of his pro-independence activities. On his return from New York, Nyerere resigned from the school, in part because he did not wish his ongoing employment to cause trouble for the missionaries. In April 1955 he and his wife returned to his Zanaki homestead. He turned down offers of employment from a newspaper and an oil company, instead accepting a job as a translator and tutor for the Maryknoll Fathers, who were preparing a mission amongst the Zanaki. By the late 1950s, TANU had extended its influence throughout the country and gained considerable support. TANU had 100,000 members in 1955, which had grown to 500,000 by 1957.

=== Touring Tanganyika: 1955–1959 ===
Nyerere returned to Dar es Salaam in October 1955. From then until Tanzania secured independence, he toured the country almost continuously, often in TANU's Land Rover. The British colonial Governor of Tanganyika, Edward Twining, disliked Nyerere, regarding him as a racialist who wanted to impose indigenous domination over the European and South Asian minorities. In December 1955, Twining established the "multi-racial" United Tanganyika Party (UTP) to combat TANU's African nationalist message. Nyerere nevertheless stipulated that "we are fighting against colonialism, not against the whites". He befriended members of the white minority, such as Lady Marion Chesham, a U.S.-born widow of a British farmer, who served as a liaison between TANU and Twining's government. A 1958 editorial in the TANU newsletter Sauti ya Tanu (Voice of TANU) that had been written by Nyerere called on the party's members to avoid participating in violence. It also criticised two of the country's district commissioners, accusing one of trying to undermine TANU and another of putting a chief on trial for "cooked-up reasons". In response, the government filed three counts of criminal libel. The trial took almost three months. Nyerere was found guilty, with the judge stipulating that he could either pay a £150 fine or go to prison for six months; he chose the former.

Twining announced that elections for a new legislative council would take place in early 1958. These would be organised around ten constituencies, each electing three members of the council: one indigenous African, one European, and one South Asian. This would end the concentration of political representation entirely with the European minority, but still meant that the three ethnic blocs would receive equal representation despite the fact that indigenous Africans made up more than 98% of the country's population. For this reason, most of TANU's leadership believed that it should boycott the election. Nyerere disagreed. In his view, TANU should participate and seek to secure the majority of the indigenous African representatives to advance their political leverage. If they abstained, he argued, the UTP would win the elections, TANU would be forced to operate entirely outside of government, and it would delay the process of attaining independence. At a January 1958 conference in Tabora, Nyerere convinced TANU to take part. In these elections, which took place over the course of 1958 and 1959, TANU won every seat it contested. Nyerere stood as TANU's candidate in the Eastern Province seat against an independent candidate, Patrick Kunambi, securing 2600 votes to Kunambi's 800. Some of the European and Asian candidates elected were TANU sympathisers, ensuring that the council was dominated by the party.

=== TANU in government: 1959–1961 ===
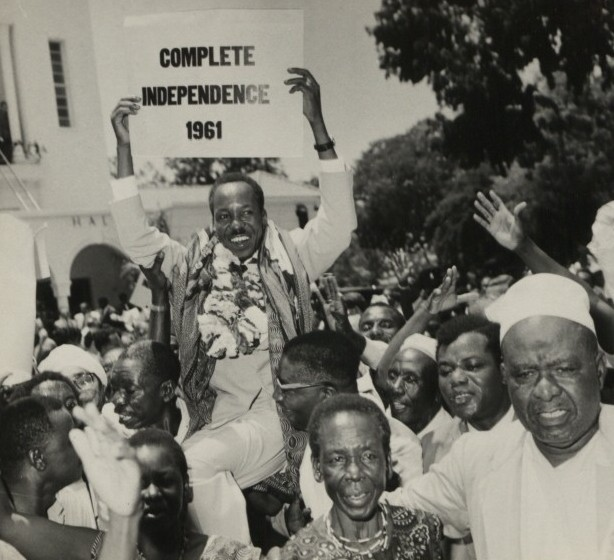
Nyerere campaigning for Tanganyikan independence in March 1961

In March 1959, the new British Governor of Tanganyika, Richard Turnbull, gave TANU five of the twelve ministerial posts available in the colony's government. Turnbull was prepared to work for a peaceful transition to independence. In 1959, Nyerere visited Edinburgh. In 1960, he attended a conference of independent African states in Addis Ababa, Ethiopia, at which he presented a paper calling for the formation of an East African Federation. He suggested that Tanganyika could delay its attainment of independence from the British Empire until neighbouring Kenya and Uganda were able to do the same. In his view, it would be much easier for the three countries to unite at the same point as independence than after it, for beyond that point their respective governments might feel that they were losing sovereignty through unification. Many senior TANU members opposed the idea of delaying Tanganyikan independence; the party had been growing, and as of 1960 had more than a million members.

In the August 1960 general election, TANU won 70 of the 71 available seats. As TANU's leader, Nyerere was called to form a new government; he became its chief minister. That year, British Prime Minister Harold Macmillan gave his "Wind of Change" speech, indicating British willingness to dismantle the empire in Africa. In March 1961, a constitutional conference was held in Dar es Salaam to determine the nature of an independent constitution; both anti-colonial campaigners and British officials attended. As a concession to the UK's colonial secretary Iain Macleod, Nyerere agreed that after independence, Tanganyika would retain the British Queen Elizabeth II as its head of state for a year before becoming a republic. In May, Tanganyika achieved self-governance. One of Nyerere's first acts as prime minister was to stop the supply of Tanganyikan labourers to South African gold mines. Although this resulted in a loss of around £500,000 a year for Tanganyika, Nyerere regarded it as a necessary act in expressing opposition to the apartheid system of white-minority rule and racial segregation implemented in South Africa.

== Premiership and Presidency of Tanganyika ==
=== Premiership of Tanganyika: 1961–1962 ===
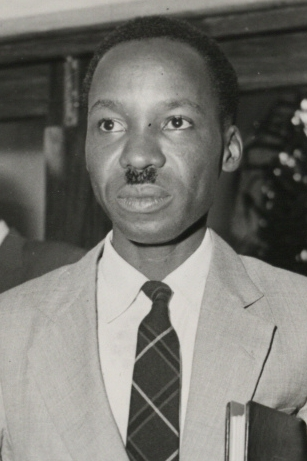
Nyerere as leader of the Legislative Council

On 9 December 1961, Tanganyika gained independence, an event marked by a ceremony at National Stadium. A law was soon presented to the Assembly that would restrict citizenship to indigenous Africans; Nyerere spoke out against the bill, comparing its racialism to the ideas of Adolf Hitler and Hendrik Verwoerd, and threatened to resign if it passed. Six weeks after independence, in January 1962 Nyerere resigned as prime minister, intent on focusing on restructuring TANU and trying to "work out our own pattern of democracy". Retreating to become a parliamentary back bencher, he appointed close political ally Rashidi Kawawa as the new prime minister. He toured the country, giving speeches in towns and villages in which he emphasised the need for self-reliance and hard work. In 1962, his alma mater at Edinburgh awarded Nyerere with an Honorary Degree of Doctor of Laws.

During Tanganyika's first year of independence, its government focused largely on domestic problems. Under a government self-help programme, villagers were encouraged to devote a day's work a week to a community project, such as constructing roads, wells, schools, and clinics. A national youth service called Jeshi la Kujenga Taifa (JKT – "army to build the country") was created to encourage young people to engage in public works and paramilitary training. In February 1962, the government announced its desire to convert the pervasive system of freehold land ownership into a leasehold system, the latter of which was deemed to be a better reflection of traditional indigenous ideas about communal land ownership. Nyerere wrote an article, "Ujamaa" ("Familyhood") in which he explained and praised this policy; in this article he expressed many of his ideas about African socialism. For Nyerere, ujamaa could provide a "national ethic" that was distinct from the colonial era and would help to cement Tanganyika's independent course amid the Cold War.

Six months after independence, the government abolished the jobs and salaries of hereditary chiefs, whose positions conflicted with government officials and who were often regarded as too close to the colonial authorities. The government also pursued the "Africanization" of the civil service, giving severance pay to several hundred white British civil servants and appointing indigenous Africans in their place, many of whom were insufficiently trained. Nyerere acknowledged that such affirmative action was discriminatory towards white and Asian citizens, but argued that it was temporarily necessary to redress the imbalance caused by colonialism. By the end of 1963, about half of senior and middle-grade posts in the civil service were held by indigenous Africans.

You go through two stages in these colonial countries. One is when midnight comes; the clock strikes, and you are independent. Fine. But then begins a whole process of changing conditions and changing people. I had been talking to the people, telling them that the second process would not be easy... But one thing must change after midnight: the attitudes of the colonial people, their way of treating Africans as nothing. This must change after midnight. The colonized are now the rulers, and the man in the street must see this! If they have been spitting in his face, now it must stop! After midnight! This cannot take twenty years! We had to drive this lesson home.

— Julius Nyerere on the deportation of white British individuals accused of racism

Over the following year, several Britons accused of racism were deported; concerns were raised about the lack of due process. Nyerere defended the deportations, stating: "for many years we Africans have suffered humiliations in our own country. We are not going to suffer them now." After the Safari Hotel in Arusha was accused of insulting Guinean President Ahmed Sékou Touré on the latter's June 1963 state visit, the government closed it. When the white-dominated Dar es Salaam Club refused admission to 69 TANU members, the government dissolved the club and appropriated its assets. Nyerere avoided becoming personally embroiled in these controversies, which brought accusations of government hypersensitivity from some foreign media.

Opposition to TANU's rule formalised into two small political parties: the senior trade unionist Christopher S. K. Tumbo founded the People's Democratic Party, while Zuberi Mtemvu formed the African National Congress, which wanted a more racialist anti-colonial stance. The government thought itself vulnerable and in 1962 introduced a law banning workers' strikes and the Preventative Detention Law, through which it could detain without trial individuals deemed a threat to national security. Nyerere defended this measure, pointing to similar laws in the United Kingdom and India, and stating that the government needed it as a safeguard given the weak state of both the police and army. He expressed the hope that the government would never have to use it, and noted that they were aware how it "could be a convenient tool in the hands of an unscrupulous government".

The government drew up plans to create a new constitution which would convert Tanganyika from a monarchy with the Queen of Tanganyika as its head of state into a republic with an elected president as head of state. This president would be elected by the population, and they would then appoint a vice president, who would preside over the National Assembly, Tanganyika's parliament. Biographer William Edgett Smith later noted that it was "a foregone conclusion" that Nyerere would be selected as TANU's candidate for president. In the November presidential election, he secured 98.1% of the vote, defeating Mtemvu. After the election, Nyerere announced that TANU's National Executive Committee had voted to ask the party's national conference to widen membership to all Tanganyikans. During the anti-colonial struggle, only indigenous Africans had been permitted to join, but Nyerere now stated that it should welcome white and Asian members. He also stipulated that "complete political amnesty" should be granted to anyone expelled from the party since 1954, allowing them to rejoin. In early 1963, Amir Jamal, an Asian Tanganyikan, became the party's first non-indigenous member; the white Derek Bryceson became its second. Nyerere welcomed Asians and Europeans into the cabinet to counter potential racial resentment from these minorities. Nyerere saw it as importance to build a "national consciousness" that transcended ethnic and religious lines.

=== Presidency of Tanganyika: 1962–1964 ===
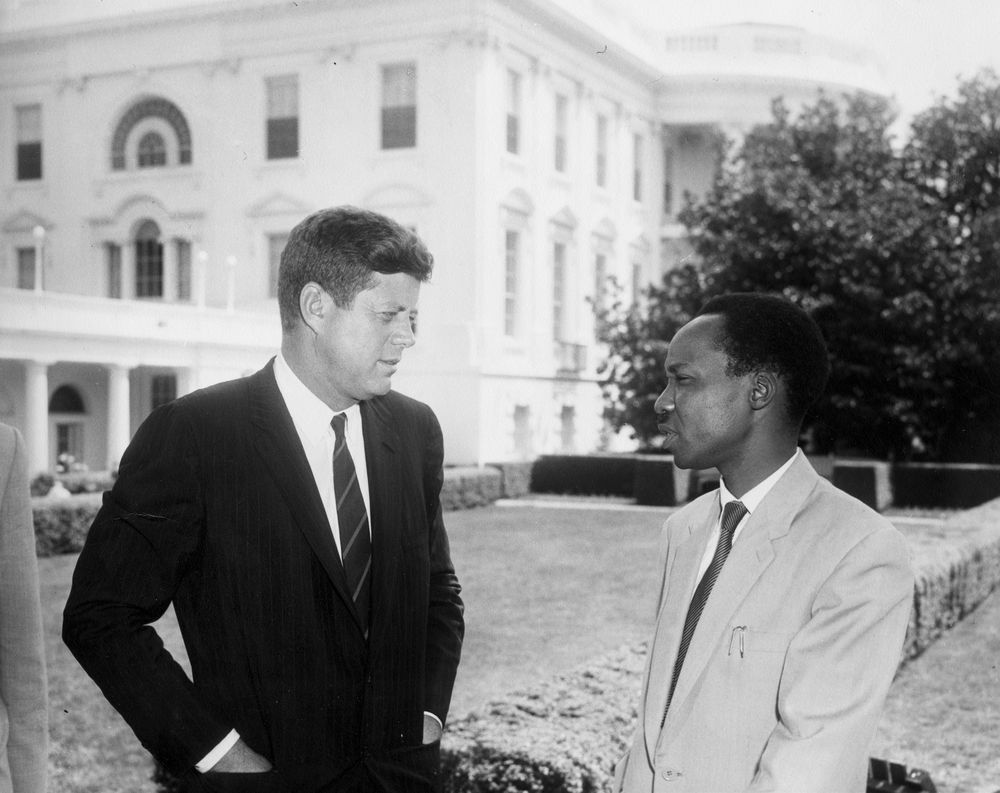
President Nyerere and U.S. President John F. Kennedy in 1963. Nyerere later commented that he had "great respect" for Kennedy, whom he regarded as a "good man".

On 9 December 1962, a year after independence, Tanganyika became a republic. Nyerere moved into the State House in Dar es Salaam, the former official residence of British governors. Nyerere disliked life in the building, but remained there until 1966. Nyerere appointed Kawawa his vice president. In 1963, he put his name forward to be Rector of Edinburgh University, vowing to travel to Scotland whenever needed; the position instead went to the actor James Robertson Justice. He made official visits to West Germany, the United States, Canada, Algeria, Scandinavia, Guinea, and Nigeria. In the U.S. he met President John F. Kennedy and although they personally liked each other, he failed to convince Kennedy to toughen his stance on apartheid South Africa.

The early years of Nyerere's presidency were preoccupied largely by African affairs. In February 1963, he attended the Afro-Asian Solidarity conference in Moshi, where he cited the recent Congolese situation as an example of the neo-colonialism, describing it as part of a "second" Scramble for Africa. In May, he attended the founding session of the Organisation for African Unity (OAU) at Addis Ababa in Ethiopia, there echoing his previous message, stating that "the real humiliating truth is that Africa is not free; and therefore it is Africa which should take the necessary collective measures to free Africa." He hosted the OAU's Liberation Committee in Dar es Salaam and provided weapons and support to anti-colonial movements active in southern Africa.

Nyerere endorsed the Pan-Africanist idea of unifying Africa as a single state, although he disagreed with the Ghanaian President Kwame Nkrumah's view that this could be achieved quickly. Instead, Nyerere stressed the idea of forming regional confederations as short-term steps towards the eventual unification of the continent. Pursuing these ideals, in June 1963 Nyerere met with Kenyan President Jomo Kenyatta and Ugandan President Milton Obote in Nairobi, where they agreed to unite their respective countries into a single East African Federation by the end of the year. This, however, never materialised. In December 1963, Nyerere lamented that this failure was the major disappointment of the year. Instead, the East African Community was launched in 1967, to facilitate some cooperation between the three countries. Later, Nyerere saw his inability to establish an East African Federation as the biggest failure of his career.

Nyerere was concerned by developments in Zanzibar, a pair of islands off of Tanganyika's coast. He noted that it was "very vulnerable to outside influences", which could in turn impact Tanganyika. Nyerere was keen to keep Cold War conflicts between the U.S. and Soviet Union out of eastern Africa. Zanzibar secured independence from the British Empire in 1963, and in January 1964 the Zanzibar Revolution took place, in which the Arab Sultan Jamshid bin Abdullah was overthrown and replaced by a government consisting largely of indigenous Africans. Nyerere was taken by surprise by the revolution. Like Kenya and Uganda, he quickly recognised the new government, although allowed the deposed Sultan to land in Tanganyika and from there fly to London. At the request of the new Zanzibar government, he sent 300 policemen to the island to help restore order.

==== Facing mutiny ====
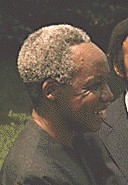
Julius Nyerere, 1977

In January 1964, Nyerere ended affirmative action hiring for the civil service. Believing the colonial imbalance to have been redressed, he stated: "it would be wrong for us to continue to distinguish between Tanganyikan citizens on any grounds other than those of character and ability to do specific tasks". Many trade unionists denounced the discontinuation of the policy and it proved the catalyst for an army mutiny. On 20 January, a small group of soldiers in the First Battalion calling themselves the Army Night Freedom Fighters launched an uprising, demanding the dismissal of their white officers and a pay rise. The mutineers left the Colito Barracks and entered Dar es Salaam, where they seized the State House. Nyerere narrowly escaped, hiding in a Roman Catholic mission for two days. The mutineers captured senior government figure Oscar Kambona, forcing him to dismiss all white officers and appoint the indigenous Elisha Kavana as head of the Tanganyika Rifles. The Second Battalion, based in Tabora, also mutinied, with Kambona acceding to their demands to appoint the indigenous Mrisho Sarakikya as their battalion leader. Having agreed to many of their demands, Kambona convinced the First Battalion mutineers to return to their barracks. Similar yet smaller mutinies broke out in Kenya and Uganda, with the governments of both calling for British military assistance in suppressing the uprisings.

The whole week has been one of most grievous shame for our nation. It will take months and even years to erase from the mind of the world what it has heard about these events this week.

— Julius Nyerere on the army mutiny

On 22 January, Nyerere came out of hiding; the next day he gave a press conference stating that Tanganyika's reputation had been damaged by the mutiny and that he would not call for military assistance from the UK. Two days later, he requested British military assistance, which was granted. On 25 January, 60 British Royal Marines were helicoptered into the city, where they landed next to the Colito Barracks; the mutineers soon surrendered. In the wake of the mutiny, Nyerere disbanded the First Battalion and dismissed hundreds of soldiers from the Second Battalion. Concerned about dissent more broadly, he discharged about ten percent of the 5000-strong police force, and oversaw the arrest of around 550 people under the Preventative Detention Act, although most were swiftly released. He denounced the ringleaders of the mutiny for trying to "intimidate our nation at the point of a gun", and fourteen of them were given sentences of between five and fifteen years imprisonment.

As the British marines left, he brought in the Nigerian Army's Third Battalion to keep order. Nyerere attributed the mutiny to the fact that his government had failed to do enough to change the army since colonial times: "We changed the uniforms a bit, we commissioned a few Africans, but at the top they were still solidly British... You could never consider it an army of the people." Acknowledging some of the mutineers' demands, he appointed Sarakikya as the new commander of the army and raised troop wages. After the mutiny, Nyerere's government became increasingly focused on security, placing TANU personnel into the army as well as state-owned industry to entrench party control throughout the country.

== Presidency of Tanzania ==
=== Unification with Zanzibar: 1964 ===
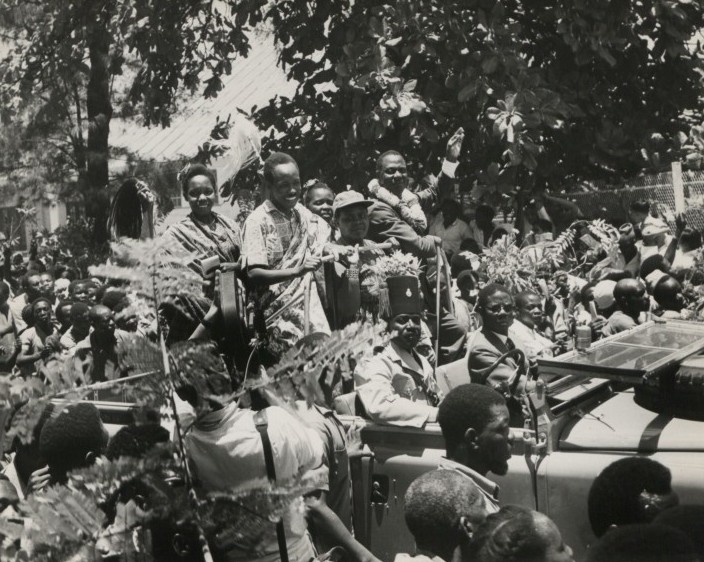
Nyerere in a public procession

Following the Zanzibari Revolutions, Abeid Karume declared himself president of a one-party state and began redistributing Arab-owned land among black African peasants. Hundreds of Arabs and Indians left, as did most of the island's British community. Western powers were reluctant to recognise Karume's government, whereas the Soviet Union, Eastern Bloc, and People's Republic of China quickly did so and offered the country aid. Nyerere was angry at this Western response as well as the wider Western failure to appreciate why black Zanzibaris had revolted in the first place.

In April, he visited Karume; the following day they announced the political unification of Tanganyika and Zanzibar. Nyerere dismissed suggestions that this had anything to do with Cold War power struggles, presenting it as a response to Pan-Africanist ideology: "Unity in our continent does not have to come via Moscow or Washington." Later biographer William Edgett Smith however suggested that a key reason for Nyerere's desire for unification was to prevent Zanzibar falling into a Cold War proxy conflict akin to those then raging in Congo and Vietnam.

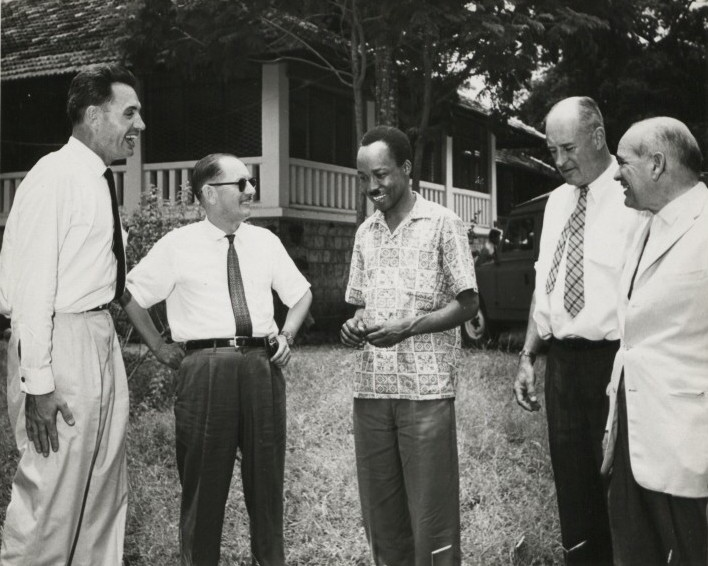
Nyerere meeting with visitors from the United Nations

An interim constitution for the "United Republic of Tanganyika and Zanzibar" presented Nyerere as the country's president, with Karume as its first vice president and Rashidi Kawawa as its second vice president. In August, the government launched a competition to find a new name for the country; two months later it announced that the winning proposal was "United Republic of Tanzania". There was no immediate change to the structure of the Zanzibari government; Karume and his Revolutionary Council remained in charge, and there was no merging of TANU and the Afro-Shirazi Party. There would be no local or parliamentary elections on the island for many years. Zanzibaris made up only 350,000 out of Tanzania's total population of 13 million, although from 1967 they were given seven of the 22 cabinet positions and directly appointed 40 of the country's 183 members of parliament. Nyerere explained this disproportionately high representation by stressing the need for sensitivity to the islanders' national pride; in 1965, he stated that "The Zanzibaris are a proud people. No one has ever intended that they should become simply the Republic's eighteenth region."

Karume was erratic and unpredictable. He was a source of repeated embarrassment to Nyerere, who tolerated him for the sake of Tanzanian unity. In one instance in August 1969, Zanzibari authorities arrested 14 men whom they accused of plotting a coup. Mainland authorities had assisted in the arrests, but—contrary to Nyerere's intentions—the arrested men were tried in secret and four of them secretly executed. Nyerere was further embarrassed by the habit of Karume and other Zanzibari Revolutionary Council members for pressuring Arab girls into marriage and then arresting their relatives to ensure compliance. As a result of rising international prices in cloves, Karume amassed £30 million in foreign exchange reserves, which he kept from the central Tanzanian government. In April 1972, Karume was assassinated by four gunmen.

=== Domestic and foreign affairs: 1964–1966 ===
In the September 1965 general election, a presidential vote took place across Tanzania, although parliamentary elections occurred only on the mainland and not on Zanzibar. Although the one-party state meant that only TANU candidates could stand, the party's national executive selected multiple candidates for all but six seats, providing some democratic choice for voters. Two ministers, six junior ministers, and nine backbenchers lost their seats and were replaced. Both Derek Bryceson and Amur Jamal, the two non-indigenous cabinet members, were re-elected over black opponents. Nyerere stood unopposed in the presidential election, although the ballot allowed space to vote against his candidacy; ultimately he secured nearly 97% support.

Tanzania experienced rapid population growth; the December 1967 census revealed a 35% population increase since 1957. This rising number of children made the government's desire for universal primary education more difficult to achieve. Observing that a small sector of the population were able to attain a high level of education, he grew concerned that they would form an elitist group apart from the rest of the people. In 1964 he stated that "some of our citizens still have large amounts of money spent on their education, while others have none. Those who receive that privilege therefore have a duty to repay the sacrifice which others have made." In 1965, it was made mandatory for all secondary school graduates to perform two years of service in the JKT. In October 1966, around 400 university students marched to State House to protest this. Nyerere spoke to the crowd in defence of the measure, and agreed to reduce government salaries, including his own. That year, Nyerere ceased using State House as his permanent residence, moving into a newly built private home on the seafront at Msasani.

In December 1966, Nyerere traveled through half of Tanzania, calling on the people to unite in pursuit of self-reliance and socialism.

==== Foreign affairs ====
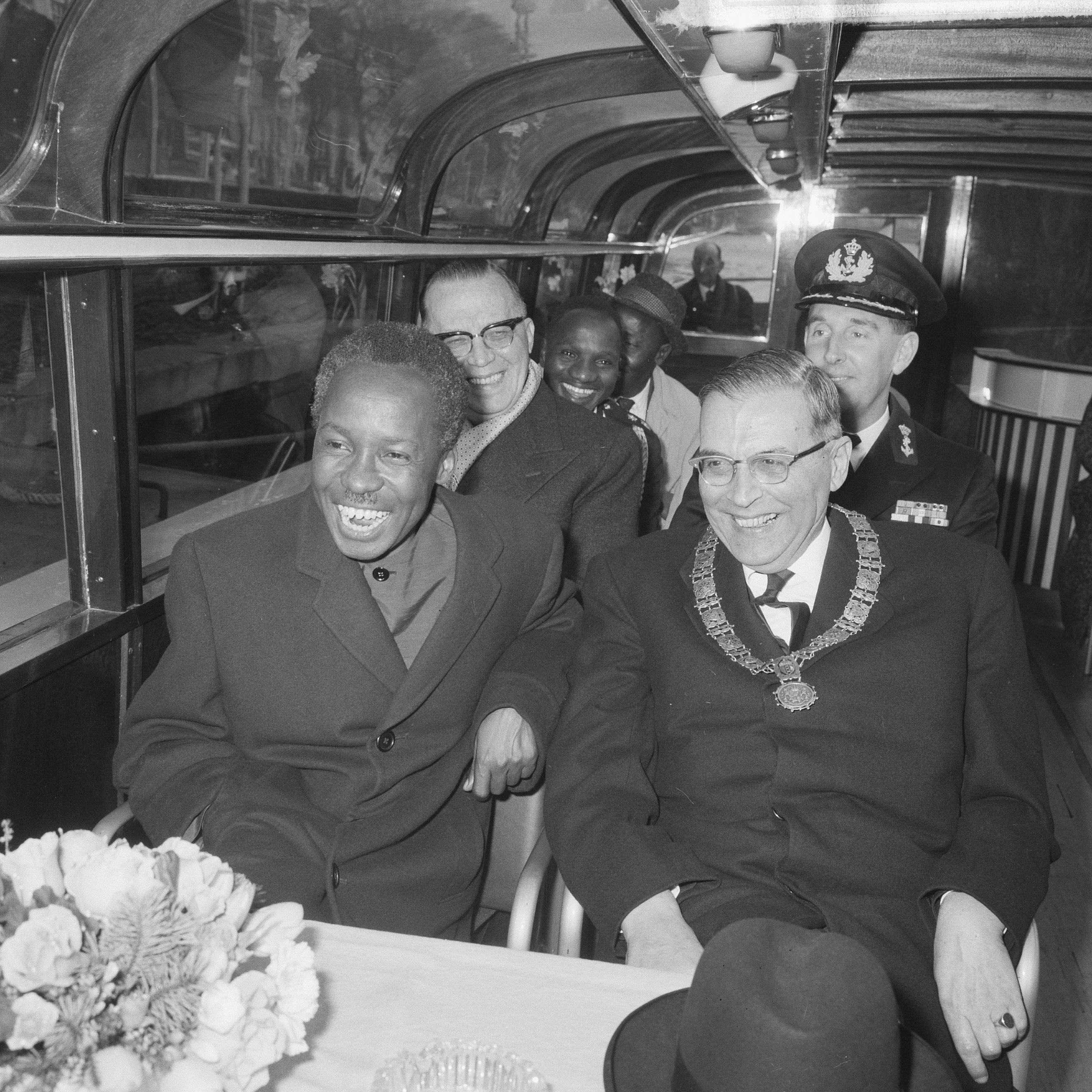
Nyerere on a visit to the Netherlands in 1965

Although Western powers urged Nyerere not to accept support from China, then governed by Mao Zedong, in August 1964 Nyerere allowed seven Chinese instructors and four interpreters to work with his army for six months. Responding to Western disapproval, he noted that most of Tanzania's military officers were British trained and that he had recently signed an agreement with West Germany to train an air wing. Over the following years, China became the main beneficiary of Tanzania's foreign relations. In February 1965, Nyerere made an eight-day state visit to China, opining that their socio-economic projects in moving an agrarian country towards socialism had much relevance for Tanzania. Nyerere was fascinated by Mao's China because it espoused the egalitarian values he shared; he was also inspired by the government's emphasis on frugality and economy. In June, Chinese Premier Zhou Enlai visited Dar es Salaam. China provided Tanzania with millions of pounds in loans and grants, and invested in a range of projects including a textile mill near Dar es Salaam, a farm implement factory, an experimental farm, and a radio transmitter. Seeking financial support to build a railway that would connect Zambia to the coast and through Tanzania, he secured Chinese backing in 1970 after Western countries refused to finance the operation.

In the early 1960s, Nyerere had private telephone lines installed linking him to Kenyatta and Obote, although these were later eliminated in a cost-saving exercise. Although the East African Federation that Nyerere desired failed to develop, he still pursued greater integration between Tanzania, Uganda, and Kenya, in 1967 co-founding the East African Community, a common market and administrative union, which was headquartered in Arusha. Nyerere wrote an introduction for Not Yet Uhuru, the 1967 autobiography of Kenyan leftist politician Jaramogi Oginga Odinga. Nyerere's Tanzania welcomed various liberation groups from southern Africa, such as FRELIMO, to set up operations in the country to work towards overthrowing the colonial and white-minority governments of these countries. Nyerere's government had warm relations with the neighbouring Zambian government of Kenneth Kaunda. Conversely, it had poor relations with another neighbour, Malawi, whose leader Hastings Banda accused the Tanzanians of supporting government ministers who he claimed opposed him. Nyerere strongly disapproved of Banda's co-operation with the Portuguese colonial governments in Angola and Mozambique and the white minority governments of Rhodesia and South Africa. In 1967, Nyerere's government was the first to grant recognition of the newly declared Republic of Biafra, which had seceded from Nigeria. Though three other African states followed, it put Nyerere at odds with most other African nationalists.

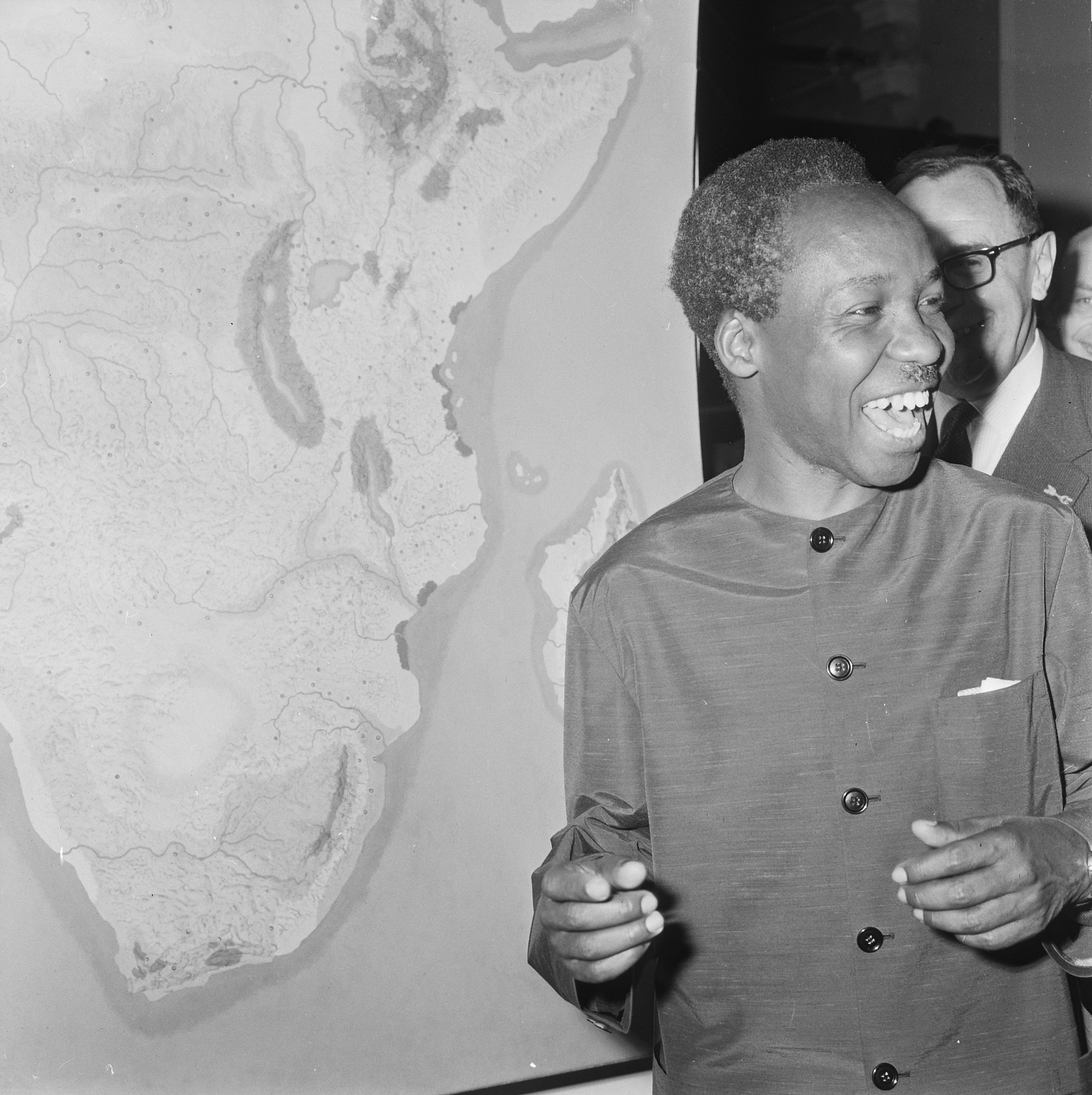
Nyerere pictured in 1965

At independence, Tanganyika had joined the British Commonwealth. In September 1965, Nyerere threatened to withdraw from the Commonwealth if Britain's government negotiated for the independence of Rhodesia with Ian Smith's white minority government rather than with representatives of the country's black majority. When Smith's government unilaterally declared independence in November, Nyerere demanded the British take immediate action to stop them. When the UK did not, in December Tanzania broke off diplomatic relations with them. This resulted in the loss of British aid, but Nyerere thought it necessary to demonstrate that Africans would stand by their word. He stressed that British Tanzanians remained welcome in the country and that violence towards them would not be tolerated. Despite the cessation of diplomatic contact, Tanzania cooperated with the UK in airlifting emergency oil supplies to landlocked Zambia, whose normal oil supply had been cut off by Smith's Rhodesian government. In 1970, Tanzania, Uganda, and Zambia all threatened to leave the Commonwealth after British Prime Minister Edward Heath appeared to resume arms sales to South Africa.

Relations were also strained with the United States. In November 1964, Kambona publicly announced the discovery of evidence of a U.S.-Portuguese plot to invade Tanzania. The evidence—which consisted of three photostat documents—was labelled a forgery by the U.S. Embassy and after Nyerere returned from a week at Lake Manyara he acknowledged that this was a possibility. After the U.S. launched Operation Dragon Rouge to retrieve white hostages held by rebels in Stanleyville, Congo, Nyerere condemned them, expressing anger that they would go to such efforts to save 1000 white lives while doing nothing to prevent the subjugation of millions of black people in southern Africa. He believed that the operation was designed to bolster the Congolese government of Moise Tshombe, which Nyerere—like many African nationalists—despised. Explaining this antipathy to Tshombe, he said: "try to imagine a Jew who recruits ex-Nazis to go to Israel and assist him in his power struggle. How would the Jews take it?" Relations with the U.S. reached their worst point in January 1965, when Nyerere expelled two members of the U.S. embassy for subversive activities; evidence was not publicly produced to demonstrate their guilt. The U.S. responded by expelling a councillor from the Tanzanian embassy in Washington D.C.; in turn, Tanzania recalled its ambassador, Othman Shariff. After 1965, Tanzanian-U.S. relations gradually improved.

=== The Arusha Declaration: 1967–1970 ===
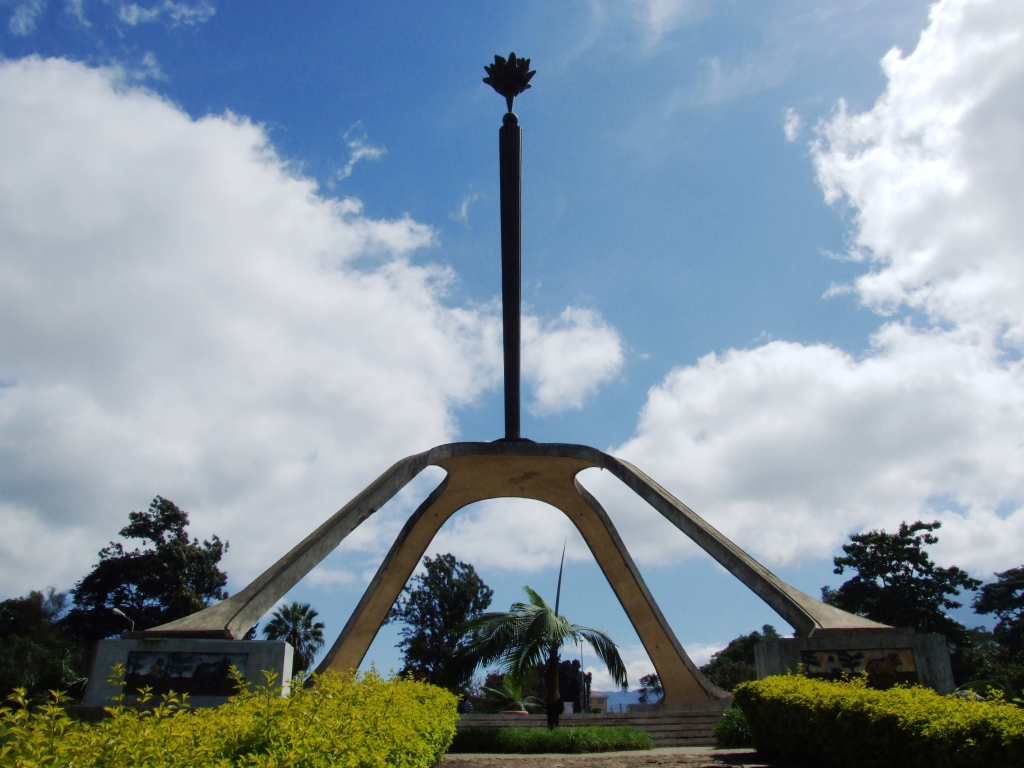
The Arusha Declaration Monument, later erected to memorialise Nyerere's declaration

In January 1967, Nyerere attended a TANU National Executive meeting at Arusha. There, he presented its committee with a new statement of party principles: the Arusha Declaration. This declaration affirmed the government's commitment to building a democratic socialist state and stressed the development of an ethos of self-reliance. In Nyerere's view, true independence was not possible while the country remained dependent on gifts and loans from other nations. It stipulated that renewed emphasis should be placed on developing the peasant agricultural economy to ensure greater self-sufficiency, even if this meant slower economic growth. After this point, the concept of socialism became central to the government's policy formation. To promote the Arusha Declaration, groups of TANU supporters marched through the countryside to raise awareness; in October, Nyerere accompanied one such eight-day march which covered 138 miles in his native Mara district.

The day after the declaration, the government announced the nationalisation of all Tanzanian banks, with compensation provided to their owners. Over the following days, it announced plans to nationalise various insurance companies, import-export firms, mills, and sisal estates, as well as the purchase of majority interest in seven other firms, including those producing cement, cigarettes, beer, and shoes. Some foreign specialists were employed to run these nationalised industries until sufficient numbers of Tanzanians had been trained to take over; the country's civil service nevertheless had little experience with economic planning, and eventually foreign companies had to be brought in to administer several nationalised industries. A year after these initial nationalisations, Nyerere praised the Tanzanian Asians for their role in ensuring the successful running of the nationalised banks, stating: "these people deserve the gratitude of our country".

Nyerere followed his declaration with a series of additional policy papers covering such areas as foreign policy and rural development. "Education for Self-Reliance" stressed that schools should place a new emphasis on teaching agricultural skills. Another, "Socialism and Rural Development", outlined a three step process for creating ujamaa co-operative villages. The first step was to convince farmers to move into a single village, with their crops planted nearby. The second was to establish communal plots where these farmers would experiment working collectively. The third was to establish a communal farm. Nyerere had been inspired by the example of the Ruvuma Development Association (RDA), an agricultural commune formed in 1962, and believed its example could be followed throughout Tanzania. By the end of 1970, there were reportedly a thousand villages in Tanzania referring to themselves as ujamaa. The peasants brought into these new villages often lacked the self-reliant enthusiasm of the RDA members; despite Nyerere's hopes, villagization rarely improved agricultural production.

The Arusha Declaration was a turning point in Tanzanian history and a widely influential speech in Africa. The speech defined the terms of political debate in Tanzania, and was initially widely popular in the country. But there were also voices of dissent.

— Historian Paul Bjerk

The Arusha Declaration announced the introduction of a code of conduct for TANU and government leaders to adhere to. This forbade them from owning shares or holding directorates in private companies, receiving more than one salary, or owning any houses that they rented to others. Nyerere saw this as necessary to stem the growth of corruption in Tanzania; he was aware of how this problem had become endemic in some African countries like Nigeria and Ghana and regarded it as a threat to his vision of African freedom. To ensure his own compliance with these measures, Nyerere sold his house in Magomeni and his wife donated her poultry farm in Mji Mwema to the local co-operative village. In 1969, Nyerere sponsored a bill to provide gratuities for ministers and regional and area commissioners which could be used as a retirement income for them. The Tanzanian Parliament did not pass the bill into law, the first time that it had rejected legislation backed by Nyerere. The majority of parliamentarians argued that its granting of additional funds to said officials broke the spirit of the Arusha Declaration. Nyerere decided not to push the issue, conceding that parliament had valid concerns.

Although the Arusha Declaration was domestically popular, some politicians spoke against it. In October 1969 a group of army officers and former politicians, including former head of the National Women's Organisation Bibi Titi Mohammad and former Labour Minister Michael Kamaliza, were arrested, accused of plotting to kill Nyerere and overthrow the government, convicted, and imprisoned. In 1969, Nyerere made a state visit to Canada. In 1969, Nyerere informed a journalist that he was contemplating retirement from the presidency, hoping to encourage new leadership, although at the same time had a desire to remain in place to oversee the implementation of his ideas. In the 1970 election, Nyerere again stood unopposed, securing 97% support for him to serve another five-year term. Again, parliamentary elections took place on the mainland but not in Zanzibar.

=== Economic crises and war with Uganda: 1971–1979 ===
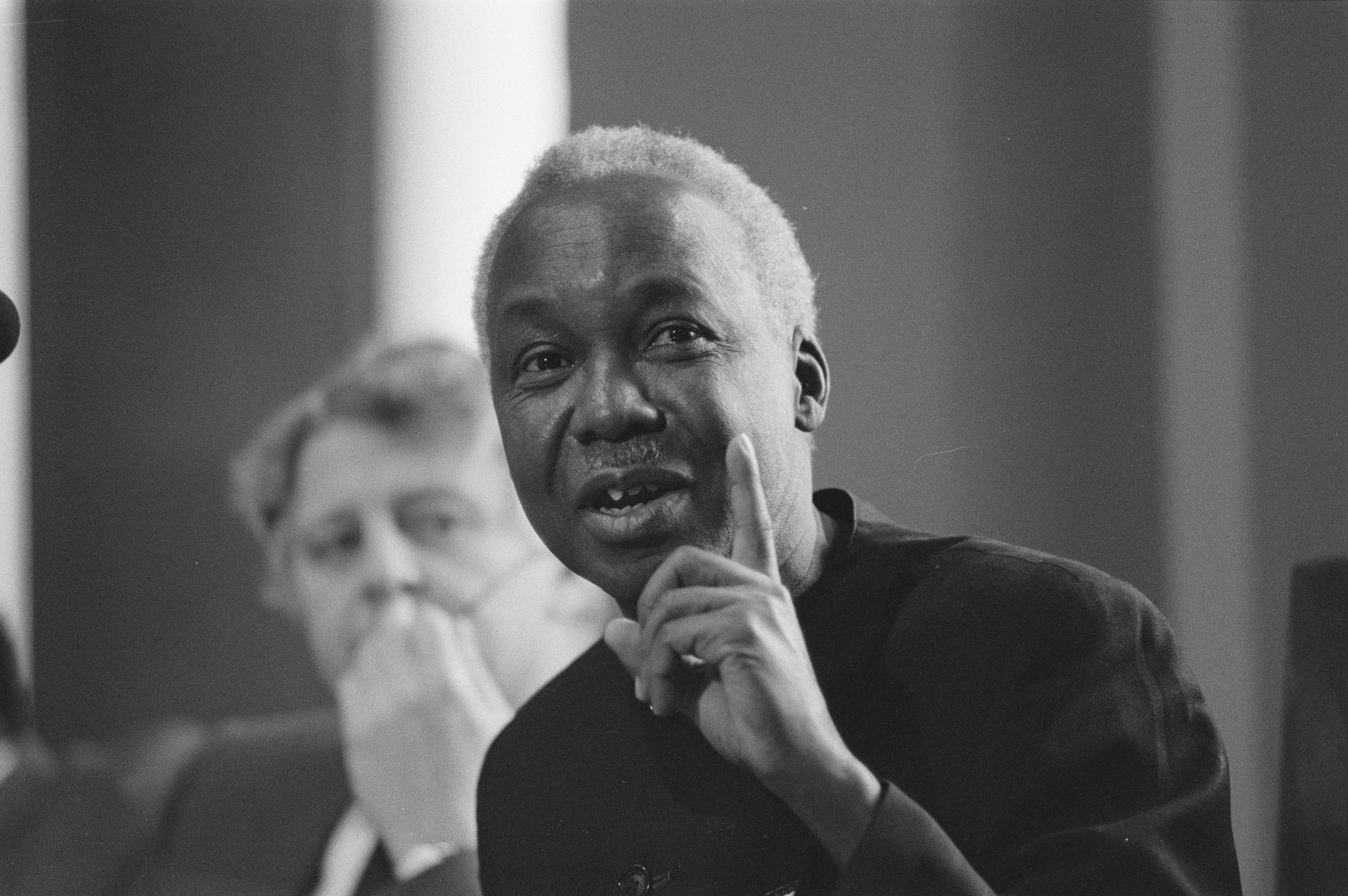
Nyerere on a visit to the Netherlands in 1985

In the early 1970s, Nyerere's government accelerated the "villagization" process. They hoped that doing so would improve agricultural productivity, allowing the country to export more and thus funding the development of light industry so that Tanzania would be able to produce more consumer goods and rely less on imports. Increasingly, farmers who refused to join the communal villages were regarded as opponents of TANU. Police began to round up farmers and forced them to move into the villages. 13 million people were eventually registered to 7000 villages. As a result, rural production was severely disrupted. According to a 1978 government survey, none of the villages had achieved the official targets for agricultural productivity. Many villages were left reliant on famine relief. In contrast to the government's intentions, food imports rose dramatically and inflation accelerated. Overall import levels tripled during the 1970s, while exports only doubled. The entire process also damaged Nyerere's reputation with the rural population.

The villagization process had greater success in ensuring wider public access to social services. Nyerere's government pursued the rapid expansion of healthcare. During the 1970s, the number of health centres more than doubled, reaching 239, while the number of rural dispensaries nearby doubled, reaching 2,600. Education was also expanded, and by 1978 80% of Tanzania's children were in school. By 1980, Tanzania was one of the few African countries that had almost eliminated illiteracy. Throughout the 1970s, bribery and embezzlement also became increasingly common in Tanzania; a parliamentary enquiry found that government losses from theft and corruption rose from 10 million shillings in 1975 to nearly 70 million shillings in 1977.

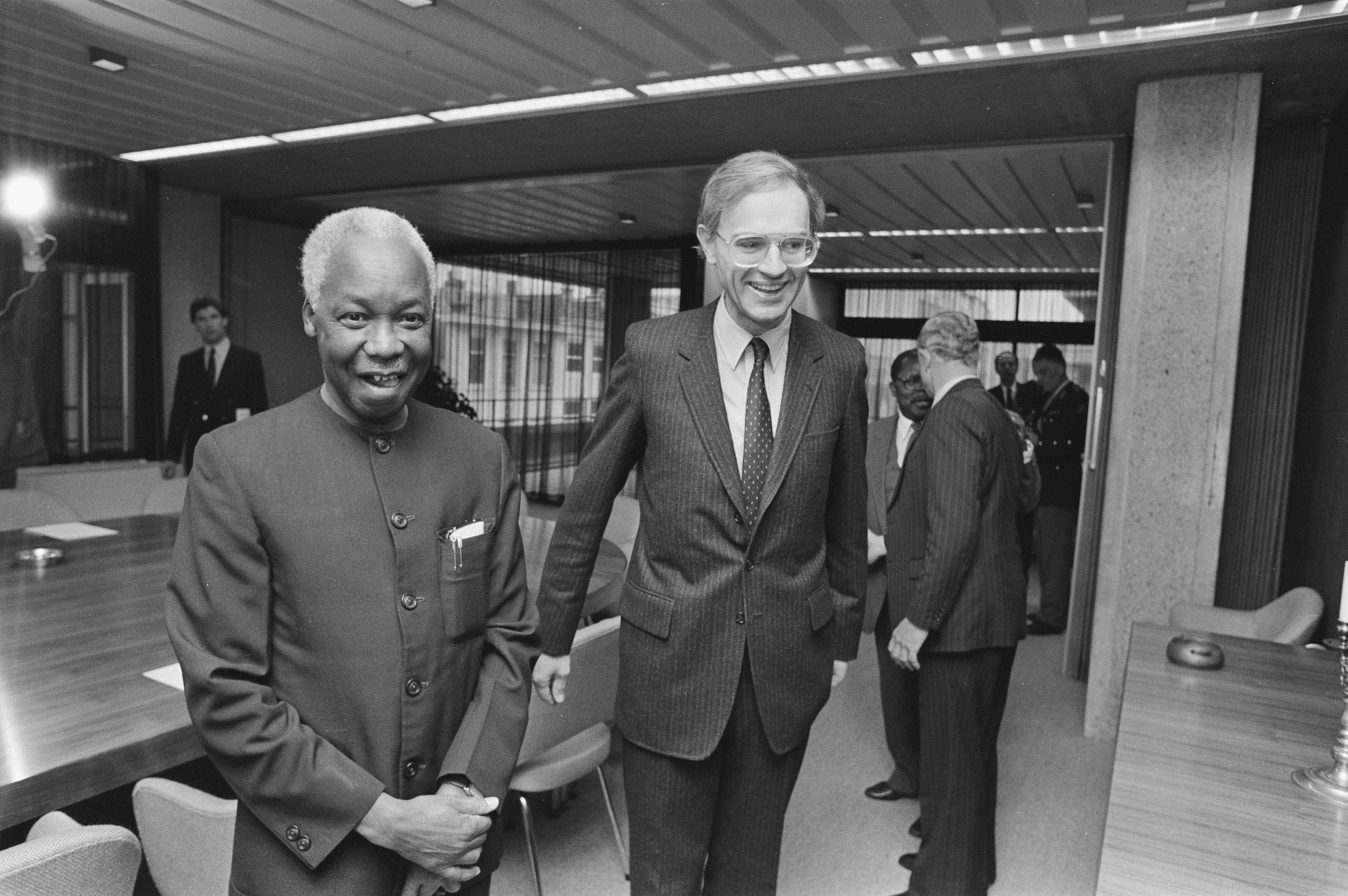
Nyerere with Onno Ruding, Dutch Minister of Finance, 1985

In early 1971, the National Assembly passed a measure authorising the nationalisation of all commercial buildings, apartments, and houses worth more than 100,000 Tanzanian shillings unless the owner resided in them. This measure was designed to stop the real estate profiteering that had grown across much of post-independence Africa. The measure further depleted the wealth of the Tanzanian Asian community, which had invested much in property accumulation; in ensuing months, nearly 15,000 Asians left the country. Various media outlets began complaining increasingly of "kulaks" and "parasites", fuelling racial tensions around Asian shopkeepers. Many Roman Catholics were angered when the government nationalised Catholic schools and made them non-denominational.

Nyerere's government established a Ministry of National Culture and Youth through which to encourage the growth of a distinctly Tanzanian culture. Through organisations it established, such as Radio Tanzania Dar es Salaam and the Baraza la Muzikila Taifa music council, the government exerted considerable control over the development of popular culture in the country. Juxtaposing idealised rural lifestyles against urban lifestyles which were labelled "decadent", Nyerere's government launched its Operation Vijana in October 1968. This targeted forms of culture considered "decadent", including soul music, beauty contests, and films and magazines considered to be of an inappropriate nature. In 1973, the government banned most foreign music from being played on national radio programmes. Nyerere believed that homosexuality was alien to Africa and thus Tanzania did not need to legislate against the discrimination of homosexuals.

Freedom of speech was such that government policy was criticised within TANU, in parliament, and in the press. However, those regarded as political subversives were still detained without trial, often in poor conditions. Nyerere rarely initiated such detentions personally, although had the final say on all such arrests. Amnesty International estimated that in 1977, there were a thousand people detained under the Preventative Detention Act, although this had declined to under 100 by 1981. In June 1976, Kambona resigned from the government, ostensibly for health reasons, and relocated to London. He then claimed to have been the victim of a plot to overthrow Nyerere orchestrated by a group opposed to the Arusha Declaration. Nyerere was angered by these statements and asked Kambona to return. It was revealed that Kambona had taken at least $100,000 of public funds with him to Britain; in absentia he was charged with treason. By 1977, Kambona had turned against Nyerere, accusing the latter of being a dictator. Over the following years, various MPs were expelled for corruption and other crimes—they claimed, however, that they were being expelled for dissenting from Nyerere's positions.

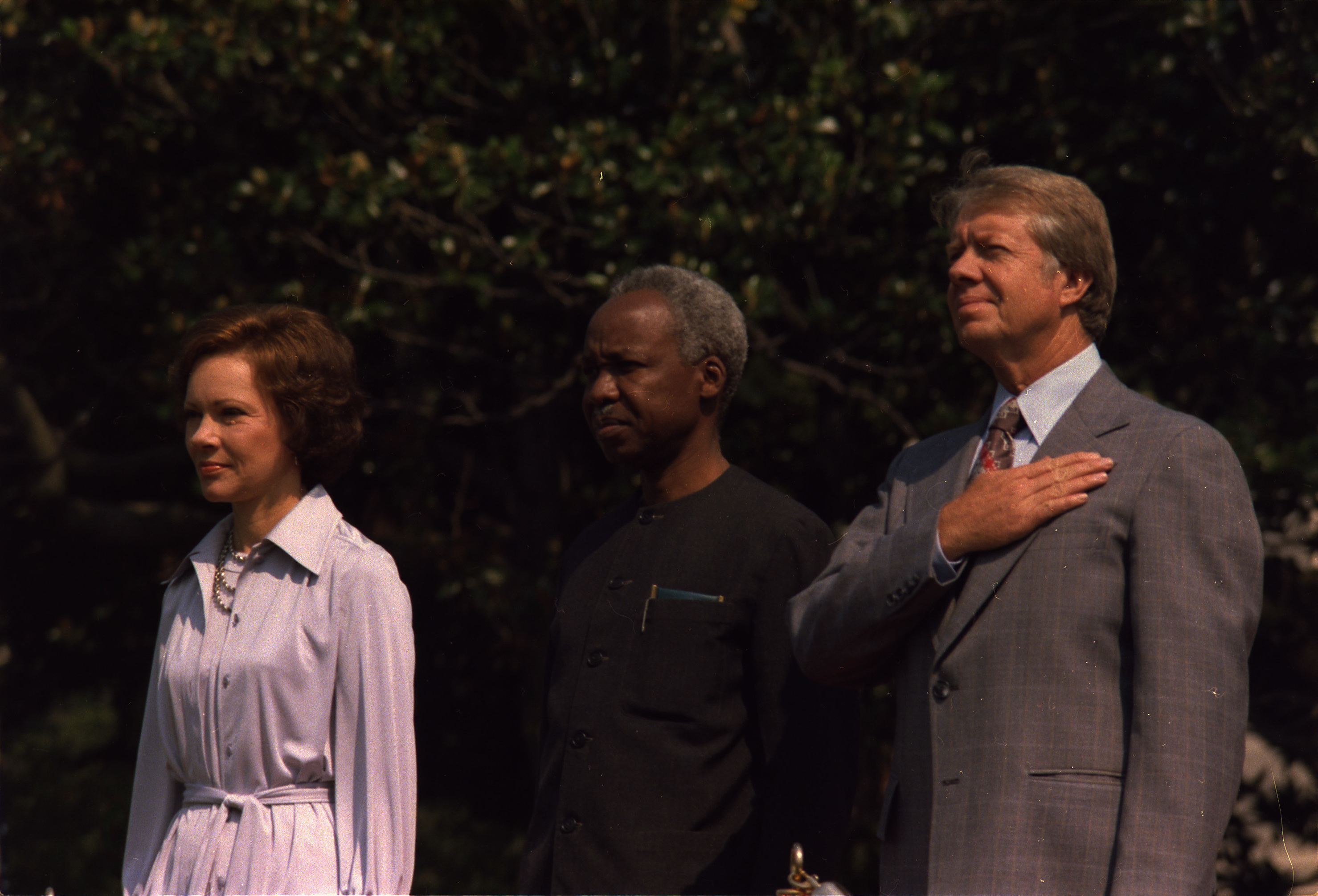
Nyerere with US President Jimmy Carter and First Lady Rosalynn Carter at the White House, 1977

By the mid-1970s, there was much speculation that Nyerere would resign. TANU again nominated him for the presidency in 1975, but in his speech he warned against repeatedly electing the same person. He spoke of the Zanaki concept of kung'atuka, which meant the leaders passing on control to a younger generation. He also proposed that having TANU govern the mainland and ASP govern Zanzibar contravened the concept of a one-party state and called for their merger. This took place in 1977, when they formed Chama Cha Mapinduzi (CCM; "Party of the Revolution"). The new constitution ensured the de jure nature of the Tanzanian one-party state. Nyerere began promoting Jumbe as his potential successor.

In 1972, Karume was assassinated; his removal from power in Zanzibar was a relief for Nyerere. Karume was succeeded by Aboud Jumbe, who had a better relationship with Nyerere. In early 1978, ministers decided to increase their strategies. Students accusing them of abandoning socialist principles and launched protests. After these clashed with police, CCM officials ordered the university to expel 350 protesters, including one of Nyerere's sons. In the late 1970s, several members of the military began organising a coup although this was exposed before it could occur and the suspects were imprisoned.

In 1977, Nyerere made his second state visit to the U.S., where President Jimmy Carter hailed him as "a senior statesman whose integrity is unquestioned". In Atlanta, Nyerere met with African-American civil rights activist Coretta Scott King and accompanied her to the grave of her husband, Martin Luther King Jr. Nyerere remained committed to backing anti-colonialist groups throughout southern Africa, including those fighting the white minority governments in Southern Rhodesia and South Africa and the Portuguese colonial administrations in Mozambique and Angola. In 1980 an election took place in Zimbabwe, resulting in the transition from the white minority government to Robert Mugabe's ZANU-PF administration; Tanzania had been supporting ZANU for many years, and Bjerk termed this "a great foreign policy victory for Nyerere".

==== Conflicts with Uganda ====
In January 1971, President Obote of Uganda was overthrown by a military coup led by Idi Amin. Nyerere refused to recognise the legitimacy of Amin's administration and offered Obote refuge in Tanzania. Shortly after the coup, Nyerere announced the formation of a "people's militia", a type of home guard to improve Tanzania's national security. He also allowed exiled Ugandans to set up rebel bases in Tanzania. In 1971, Uganda bombed the Kagera Saw Mill in Tanzania in response to Nyerere's support for Obote. When Amin expelled all 50,000 Ugandan Asians from his country in 1972, Nyerere denounced the act as racist. One boatload of Ugandan Asian refugees attempted to land in Tanzania, although Nyerere's government refused to permit them, concerned that it would stoke domestic racial tensions. Having been informed of an alleged plot by Amin to overthrow him, Nyerere decided to allow Obote's followers to launch an operation to overthrow the Ugandan government. In September 1972, Obote loyalists invaded Uganda from Tanzania, but were routed by Amin's security forces. Ugandan forces retaliated by bombing the Tanzanian border towns of Bukoba and Mwanza. Nyerere rejected his generals' urges to respond with force and agreed to Somali mediation, which resulted in the signing of a peace agreement between Uganda and Tanzania. Nevertheless, relations between Nyerere and Amin remained tense. The Tanzanian President allowed Ugandan rebels to continue to operate in Tanzania, though he urged them to keep a low profile. In 1977, the East African Community that Tanzania had formed with Kenya and Uganda formally collapsed.

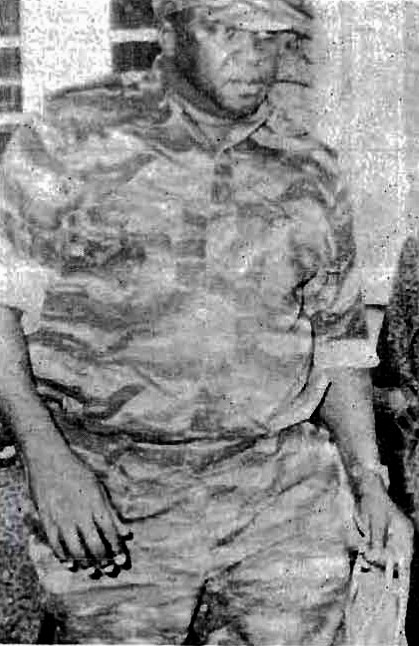
During the Uganda-Tanzania War, Nyerere's troops ousted Idi Amin (pictured) from power in Uganda.

In October 1978, Uganda invaded Tanzania, annexing the Kagera Salient. Nyerere decided that Tanzania's response should be not only to push the Uganda Army back into Uganda, but to invade the latter and overthrow Amin. To achieve this, he mobilized tens of thousands of civilian-soldiers to aid the regular army. In January 1979, three Tanzanian battalions pushed into Uganda and levelled Mutukula, slaughtering many of the civilians living there. Nyerere was appalled and ordered measures to ensure the Tanzanians would not attack civilian targets in future. Nyerere also lobbied foreign ambassadors to cut off supplies of oil and weapons to Uganda. Over the following months, the Tanzanian army pushed further into Uganda. After they took control of Kampala, Amin and many of his followers fled into exile.

During the war, Nyerere had been planning for how to establish a post-Amin government in Uganda. Although Obote retained a level of popularity in Uganda, many other exiles warned him not to restore Obote to the presidency, noting that he had alienated too many sectors of society. Nyerere accepted this advice, and when organising a March 1979 conference for exile groups in Moshi convinced Obote not to attend. The conference decided that it would back Yusuf Lule as an interim replacement. After Amin's ouster, Lule was declared president, but was soon removed from office and replaced by Godfrey Binaisa. Binaisa too was only in power for a brief time, and the 1980 general election resulted in Obote once again becoming leader. Nyerere withdrew most of the Tanzanian army, leaving only a small training contingent, although Uganda entered a cycle of civil wars until 1986.

The war cost Tanzania approximately US$500 million, further damaging its fragile economy. There were widespread shortages of consumer goods that encouraged a growth of hoarding and smuggling, while many returning soldiers resorted to criminality. Tanzania's Finance Minister Edwin Mtei entered negotiations with the International Monetary Fund (IMF) and in early 1979 came to an agreement that the country would receive debt relief in exchange for a program of austerity measures including parastatal restricting, wage freezes, raising interest rates, and relaxing import controls. When Mtei brought the deal to Nyerere, the latter rejected it, seeing it as a rejection of his socialist message. Mtei then resigned. Nyerere viewed the IMF as a neocolonial tool which imposed policies on poorer countries that benefitted their wealthier counterparts.

=== Final term in office: 1980–1985 ===
In the 1980 Tanzanian general election, Nyerere again stood as CCM's candidate for the presidency. He took an active role in trying to find a successor. One of his favourites was the Zanzibari Seif Sharif Hamad, whom Nyerere brought into the CCM's Central Committee. His relationship with Jumbe became strained, and he encouraged the latter to resign.

By 1985, Ali Hassan Mwinyi, a Zanzibari Muslim, had arisen as the most prominent candidate as Nyerere's successor, and Nyerere ultimately agreed to support his candidature. Nyerere stood down as president, with Mwinyi replacing him at the 1985 general election. In doing so, Nyerere—according to A. B. Assensoh—was "one of the few African leaders to have voluntarily, gracefully, and honourably bowed out" of governance. This brought him much respect internationally. Nyerere remained chair of CCM until 1990 and from this position became a vocal critic of Mwinyi's policies. Mwinyi wanted to pursue economic liberalisation, removing some of Nyerere's favourites from the cabinets who opposed his reforms. These reforms led to inflation and devaluation of currency, destroying the savings of many Tanzanians. Nyerere saw these reforms as an abandonment of his socialist ideals.

== Post-presidential activity ==
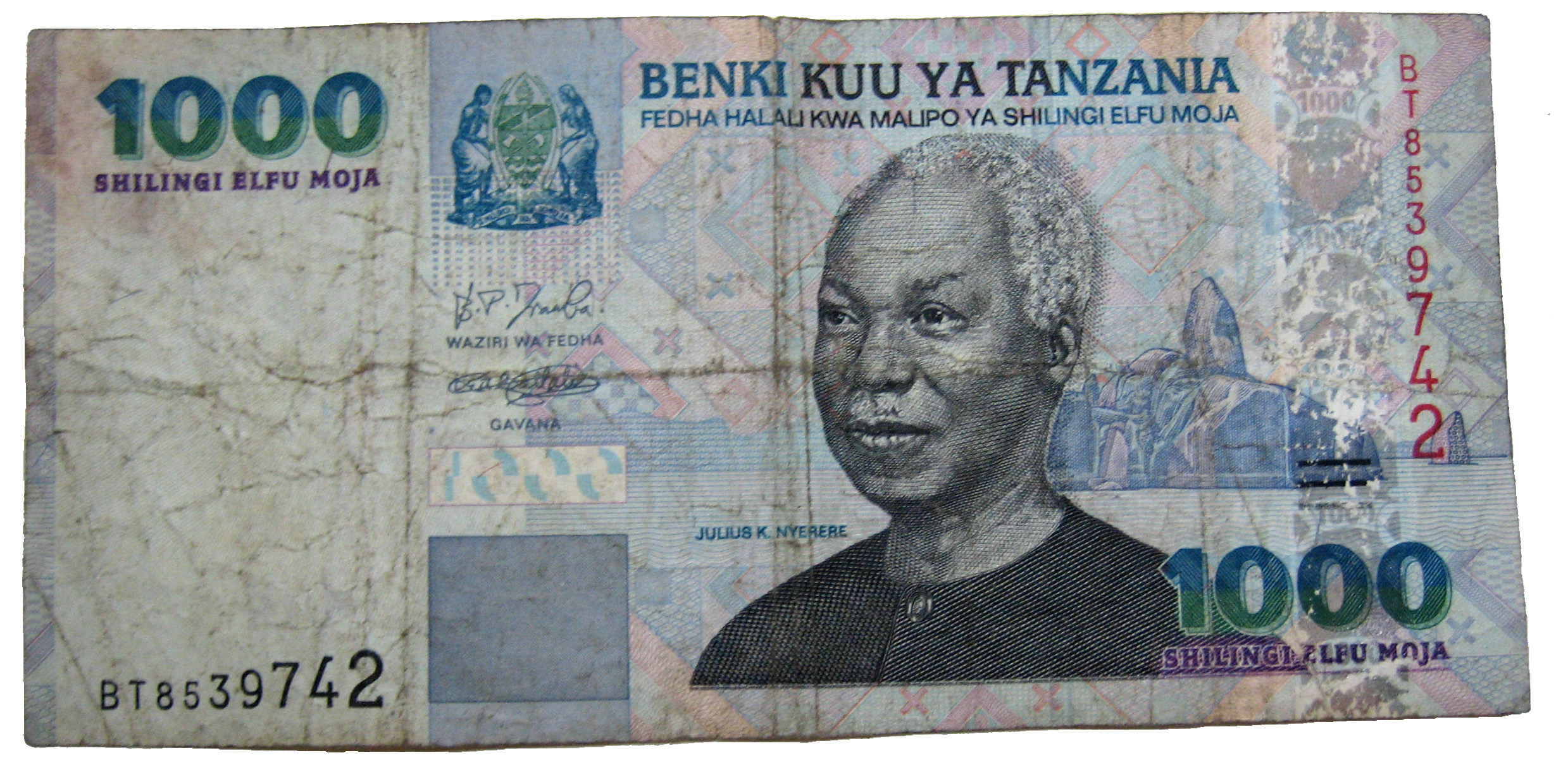
Nyerere's portrait on the Tanzanian 1000 shilling note

In July 1987, Nyerere returned to the University of Edinburgh to attend a conference on "The Making of Constitutions and the Development of National Identity", where he gave the opening address on post-independence Africa. He was invited to chair an international committee on the economic problems facing the "Global South", where he worked alongside the future Indian Prime Minister Manmohan Singh.

In August 1990 Nyerere stepped down as the chair of CCM. Before stepping down as CCM chair, he advocated Tanzania's transition into a multi-party democracy. He believed that the CCM had become too hidebound and corrupt and that competition with other parties would force it to improve. His belief in reform was influenced by his observation of what had occurred in other socialist states: the Eastern Bloc had collapsed, Mikhail Gorbachev had pursued perestroika and glasnost in the Soviet Union, and Deng Xiaoping had overseen economic reform in China. Nyerere stated: "we cannot remain an island. We must manage our own change – don't wait to be pushed". Mwinyi then established the Nyalali Commission to examine the question of a transition to a multi-party system. It concluded that although most Tanzanians wanted to retain the one-party system, Tanzania would benefit from competing parties. Rival parties like Chadema, the Civic United Front, and NCCR–Mageuzi appeared, although CCM remained dominant. Freedom of speech was also expanded with a range of new newspapers appearing.

The Nyalali Commission had also recommended a transition to a "three-government" federation, with independent state governments for both Zanzibar and the mainland in addition to the unified federal government. This was designed to placate calls for Zanzibari autonomy, although Nyerere opposed it. He argued that there was no evidence it would improve government and that it would waste tax-payer's money. In 1992, the Zanzibari government joined the Organisation of the Islamic Conference, something Nyerere criticised, arguing that foreign affairs was a federal issue and should not be delegated to the Zanzibari state. In 1993, 55 mainland parliamentarians called for the establishment of a mainland regional government, which Nyerere attacked in a pamphlet the following year. In 1995, he gave the nyufa speech in which he warned of "cracks" in the Tanzanian state caused by corruption, separatism, and tribalism. He expressed concerns about growing mainland chauvinism as a response to Zanzibari separatism and argued that it would develop into tribal resentments and rivalries. These concerns were influenced by the recent events of the Rwandan genocide, during which members of Rwanda's Hutu majority had turned on its Tutsi minority.

Privately, he remained involved in CCM politics and lobbied to ensure that Benjamin Mkapa succeeded Mwinyi as its leader. He campaigned in support of the CCM candidates in Tanzania's 1995 presidential election. Mkapa won the election, but there were charges of electoral fraud in coastal regions. In a speech at the CCM general assembly, Nyerere indicated that he intended to pull out from politics altogether.

=== Final years: 1994–1999 ===
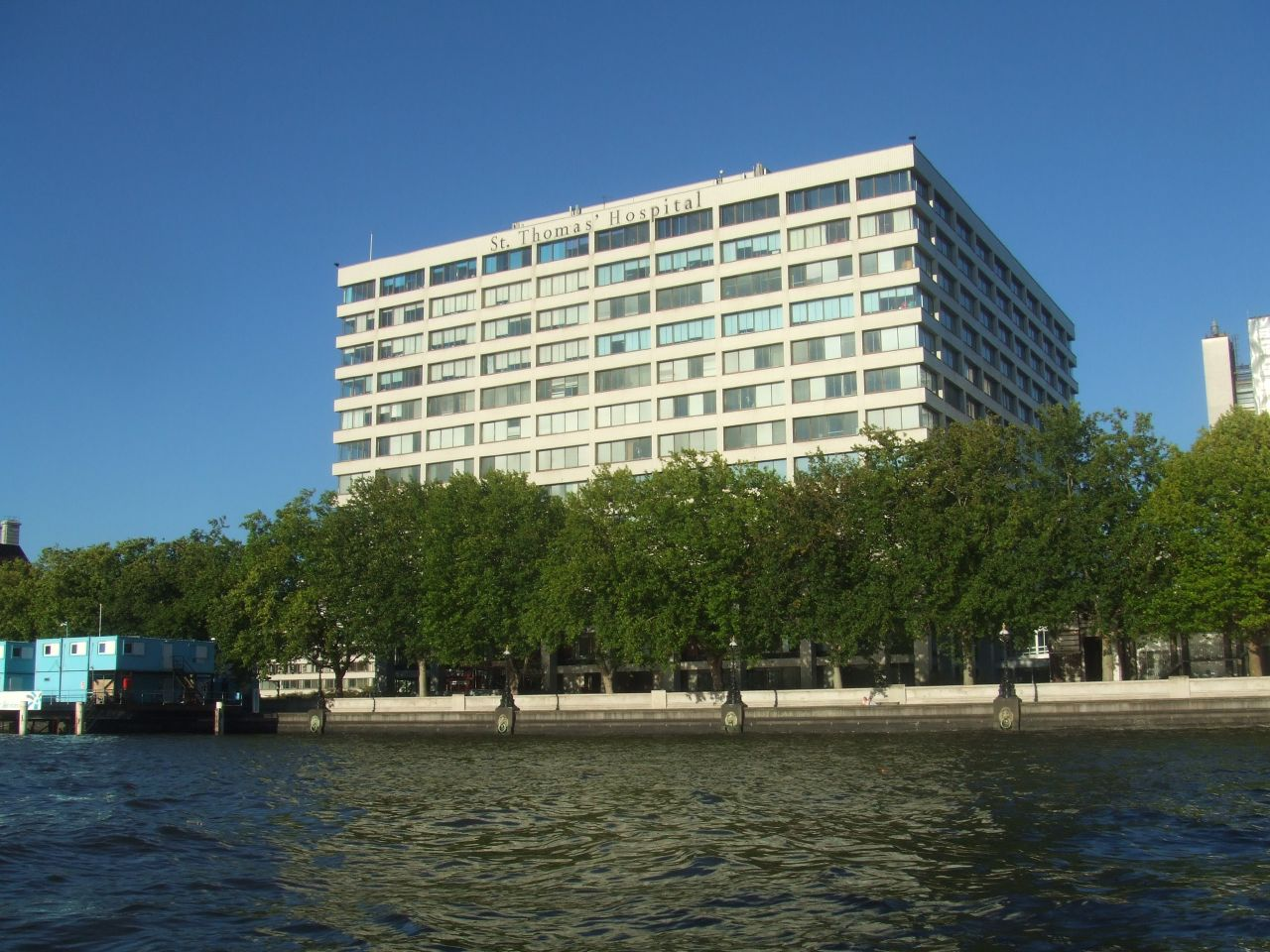
Nyerere died in St Thomas' Hospital, London.

Nyerere remained active in international affairs, attending the 1994 Pan-African Congress, held in the Ugandan city of Kampala. In 1997, he gave a speech marking the fortieth anniversary of Ghanaian independence in which he expressed renewed support for Pan-African ideals and warning against a "return to the tribe" across the continent. He pointed to the example of growing European unity within the European Union as a model for African states to imitate. In the late 1990s he also reflected on his presidency, noting that although he made mistakes, particularly in prematurely pursuing nationalisation, he stood by the principles of the Arusha Declaration.

After the 1995 elections, the United Nations asked Nyerere to step in as a mediator to help end the Burundian Civil War. In 1996, the Mwalimu Nyerere Foundation was established though which the negotiations could take place; it was modelled on the U.S. Carter Center. That year, he oversaw two negotiation sessions between competing factions in Mwanza, with additional sessions in Arusha in 1998 and 1999. Nyerere was adamant that a resolution for peace should arise from a regional initiative rather than one brought forth by the Western powers. He insisted on a process of inclusivity, with even the smallest political groups being invited to take part in the negotiation process, and also emphasised the construction of civilian political institutions as key to a lasting peace in Burundi. The negotiations would continue until Nyerere's death, at which his role was taken on by former President of South Africa Nelson Mandela. In 1997, he made his final visit to Edinburgh, delivering the Lothian European Lecture and teaching seminars at the university's Centre of African Studies. The government and army contributed funds to build Nyerere a house in his home village; it was finished in 1999, although he only spent two weeks there prior to his death.

By 1998, Nyerere was aware that he had terminal leukemia but kept this from the public. In September 1999 he travelled to England for medical care, being hospitalised in St Thomas' Hospital, London. There, in early October he had a major stroke and was placed in intensive care. He died on 14 October 1999, with his wife and six of his children at his bedside. Benjamin Mkapa, Tanzanian president at the time, announced Nyerere's death on national television, and also proclaimed a 30-day mourning period. Nyerere was honoured by Tanzanian state radio playing funeral music while video footage of him were broadcast on television. Rwanda declared 10 days of mourning, Mozambique declared 7 days, Zambia and Kenya declared 4 days, and Gabon declared 2 days of national mourning. A requiem mass was held at Westminster Cathedral on 16 October. His body was then flown back to Tanzania, where it was carried past crowds in Dar es Salaam and taken to his coastal home. There, another requiem mass was held at St Joseph's Cathedral. A funeral was then held at the National Stadium, in which hundreds passed by the body as it lay in state. Finally, the body was flown to Butiama and buried.

== Political ideology ==
Nyerere's ideology, a form of African socialism, is known as Ujamaa. Although attaining some of his early ideas from African Association contemporaries in Tanganyika, many of Nyerere's political beliefs were developed while he was studying in Edinburgh; he noted that he "evolved the whole of my political philosophy while I was there". In the city, he was influenced by texts produced within the traditions of classical liberalism and Fabian socialism, as well as by his reading of Adam Smith and John Stuart Mill, both of whom he had studied as a student. For much of his life he was a prolific writer and speaker, leaving much material behind espousing his ideology. The political economist Issa G. Shivji noted that although Nyerere was "a great man of principle" but that when in power, "at times pragmatism, even Machiavellism, overshadowed his avowed principles". As a result, Shivji argued, Nyerere exhibited "a great ability and talent to rationalise his political actions with an astute exposition of principles".

=== Anti-colonialism, non-racialism, and Pan-Africanism ===
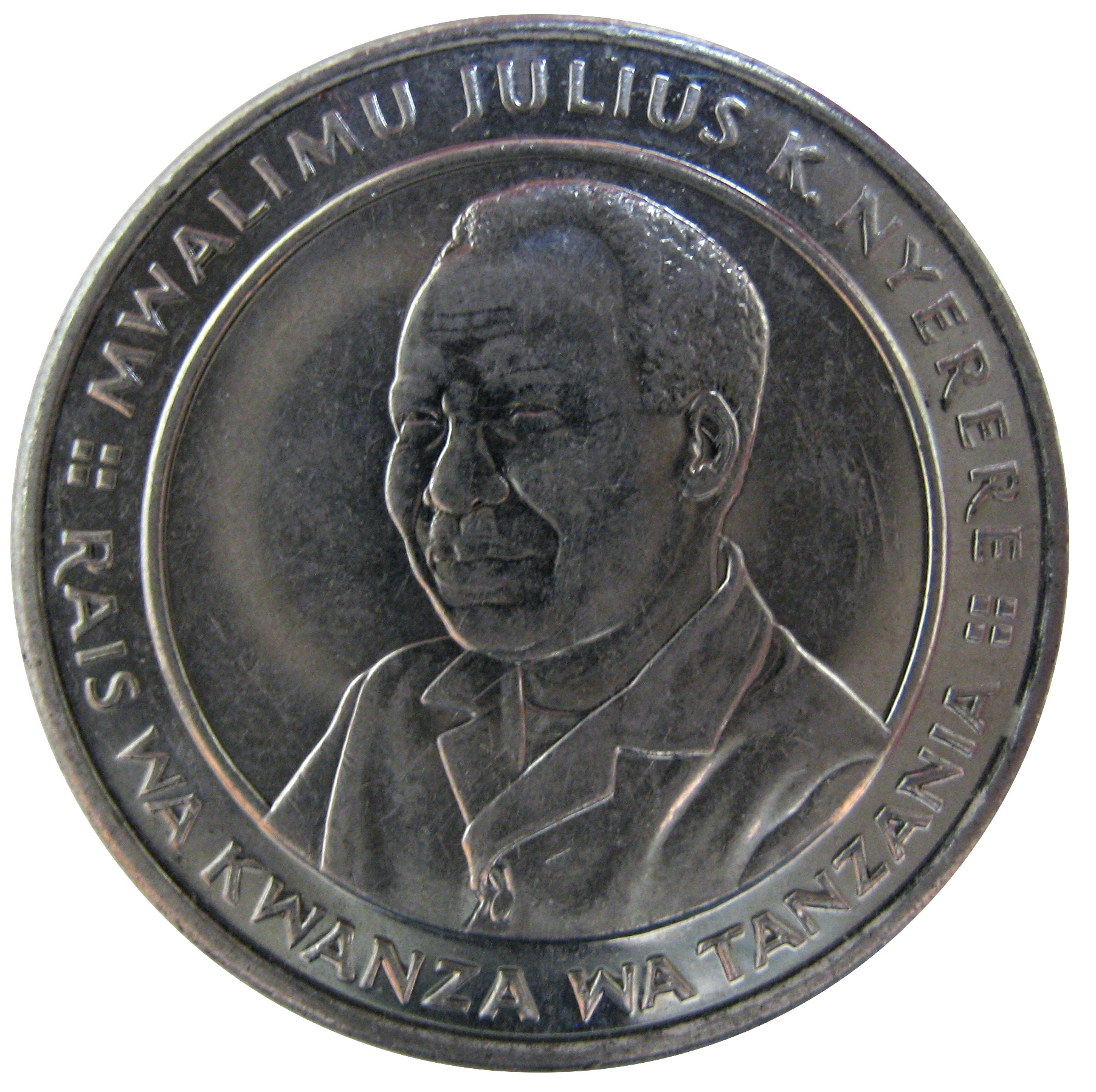
10 tz shillings back

Nyerere was an African nationalist. He despised colonialism, and felt duty bound to oppose the colonial state in Tanganyika. In campaigning against colonialism, Nyerere acknowledged that he was inspired by the principles behind both the American Revolution and the French Revolution. He was also influenced by the Indian independence movement, which successfully resulted in the creation of an Indian republic in 1947, just before Nyerere studied in the United Kingdom. Nyerere insisted that the situation in Tanganyika was such that non-violent protest was possible and should be pursued, stating: "I'm non-violent in the sense of Mohandas Gandhi... I feel violence is an evil with which one cannot become associated unless it is absolutely necessary". After becoming leader of his county, he became a prominent supporter of anti-colonial movements in southern Africa, providing said groups with material, diplomatic, and moral support.

Although opposing European colonialism, Nyerere was not antagonistic towards white Europeans; from his experiences he was aware that they were not all colonialists and racists. Prior to independence he insisted on a non-racialist front against colonialism, challenging those African nationalists who wanted to deny equal rights to East Africa's European and Asian minorities. In a 1951 essay written in Edinburgh, he proposed that "We must build up a society in which we shall belong to east Africa and not to our racial groups ... We appeal to all thinking Europeans and Indians to regard themselves as ordinary citizens of Tanganyika... We are all Tanganyikans and we are all east Africans." He argued that racial equality should be upheld on an individual basis, with individuals being legally protected against racial discrimination, rather than being enshrined in government with certain parliamentary seats reserved for different racial groups. This involvement in multi-racial politics differed from the approaches adopted by many other African nationalists in Tanganyika. When in power, Nyerere ensured that his government and close associates reflected a cross-section of East African society, including black Africans, Indians, Arabs, and Europeans, as well as practitioners of Christianity, Islam, Hinduism, and African traditional religion.

Nyerere was also a Pan-Africanist. He nevertheless saw a tension between his governance of a nation-state and his Pan-Africanist values, referring to this as "dilemma of the pan-Africanist" in a 1964 address.

=== Democracy and the one-party state ===
Nyerere emphasised the idea of democracy as a principle. He described democracy as "government by the people... Ideally, it is a form of government whereby the people – all the people – settle their affairs through free discussion." This is a definition close to that generated by the clergyman Theodore Parker, whose influence he acknowledged. It was also influenced by forms of localised decision making found in various indigenous African societies, with Nyerere stating that discussing an issue till everyone agreed was "the very essence of traditional African democracy". He absorbed the values of liberal democracy but focused attention on how to "Africanize" democracy. He emphasized that post-colonial African states were in a very different situation to Western countries and thus required a different governance structure; specifically, he favoured a representative democratic system within a one-party state. He opposed the formation of different parties and other political organisations with differing objectives in Tanzania, deeming them disruptive to his idea of the harmonious society and fearing their ability to further destabilise the fragile state.

He criticised the de facto two-party system he had observed in the United Kingdom, describing it as "foot-ball politics". In his words, "where there is one party, and that party is identified with the nation as a whole, the foundations of democracy are firmer than they can ever be when you have two or more parties, each representing only a section of the community!" He repeatedly wrote arguments on these ideas, often aimed at Western liberals. Following the 1965 parliamentary election, in which different candidates from the same party competed for most seats, Nyerere noted: "I don't blame Westerners for being sceptical. The only democracies they have known have been multi-party systems, and the only one-party systems they have seen have been non-democratic. But: a multiplicity of parties does not guarantee democracy". For Nyerere, it was the preservation of political and civil liberties, rather than the presence of multiple parties, that ensured democracy; he believed that freedom of speech was possible in a one-party state. However, his opposition to the formation of competing political groups led critics to argue that there were anti-democratic implications to his thought.

Nyerere was keen to associate himself with the idea of freedom, titling his three major compilations of speeches and writings Freedom and Unity, Freedom and Socialism, and Freedom and Development. His conception of freedom was strongly influenced by the ideas of German philosopher Immanuel Kant. Like Kant, Nyerere believed that the purpose of the state was to promote liberty and the freedom of the individual.

He was one of the signatories of the agreement to convene a convention for drafting a world constitution. As a result, a World Constituent Assembly convened to draft and adopt the Constitution for the Federation of Earth.

=== African socialism ===
At the heart and centre of Nyerere's political values was an affirmation of the fundamental equality of all humankind and a commitment to the building of social, economic and political institutions which would reflect and ensure this equality.

— Pratt, 2000

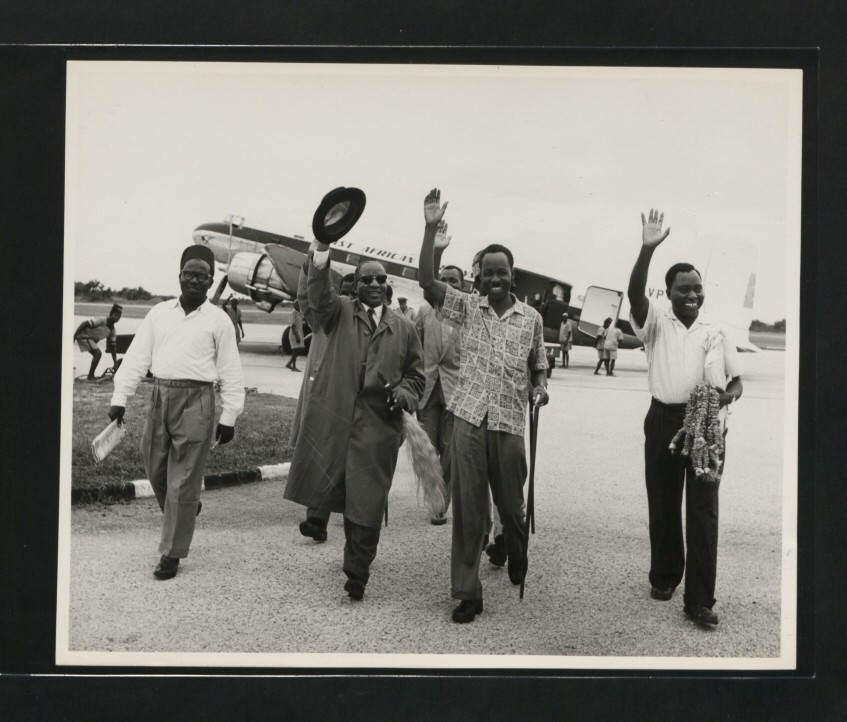
The National Archives UK

Nyerere was a socialist, with his views on socialism intertwined with his ideas on democracy. He promoted African socialism from at least July 1943, when he wrote an article referring to the concept in the Tanganyika Standard newspaper. Where he learned the term is not clear, for it would not become widely used until the 1960s. Nyerere saw socialism not as an alien idea to Africa but as something that reflected traditional African lifestyles. In his view, a "socialist attitude of mind" was already present in traditional African society. In his words from 1962, "We, in Africa, have no more need of being "converted" to socialism than we have of being "taught" democracy. Both are rooted in our past – in the traditional society which produced us." He presented the traditional African village—as well as the ancient Greek city state—as the model for the idealised society. Molony described Nyerere as having produced "romanticised accounts of idyllic village life in 'traditional society'", describing his as "a misty-eyed view" of this African past.

Nyerere's ideas about socialism owed little to either European social democracy or Marxism; he detested the Marxist idea of class struggle. Although he quoted from Karl Marx's Capital when speaking to certain audiences, he criticized the wholehearted support of "scientific socialism" promoted by Marxists like Marx and Vladimir Lenin. Nyerere believed Marx was a "great thinker" who gave a "brilliant analysis of the industrial capitalist society in which he lived," however he denounced the reverent treatment that proponents of Marxism held towards scientific socialism. He expressed the view that Marxist ideas about the construction of a socialist society from a capitalist one through the efforts of a revolutionary urban proletariat class were not applicable to post-colonial Africa, where there was little or no capitalism or proletariat and where—in Nyerere's view—traditional society was not stratified into competing economic classes. In most of Africa, Nyerere said, "we have to begin our socialism from tribal communalism and a colonial legacy which did not build much capitalism". According to Nyerere, "In a socialist society it is the socialist attitude of mind, and not the rigid adherence to a standard political pattern, which is needed."

As Nyerere noted in 1979 interview, when asked to describe Tanzanian socialism:

I would describe our ideology as socialist. That’s all. We’re fighting against capitalism, all of us. We’re trying to establish, I hope, just societies, healthy relationships between individuals. We’ve started from different bases. I am not a Marxist. I do accept the economics of Marxism. I do not accept some of the philosophies of Marxism. But even the economies have some difficulty. Classically, Marxism is a socialism of the rich. It is a socialism which starts with highly developed capitalism, a highly developed proletariat. At present it is the United States, under Marxism, which is really ripe for socialism. It has a proletariat,, and this proletariat is a product of capitalism itself.

Nyerere incorporated themes from Chinese socialism into ujamaa, including self-reliance, mass politics, the political centrality of the peasantry. He was critical of the utopian socialism promoted by figures like Henri de Saint-Simon and Robert Owen, seeing their ideas as largely irrelevant to the Tanzanian situation. In his view, these European socialist writers had not produced ideas suited to the African context because they had not considered the history of "colonial domination" which Africa had experienced.

The only way to defeat our present poverty is to accept the fact that it exists, to live as poor people, and to spend every cent that we have surplus to our basic needs on the things which will make us richer, healthier and more educated in the future.

— Julius Nyerere

Nyerere firmly believed in egalitarianism and in creating a society of equals, referring to his desire for a "classless society". In his view, the equality of ujamaa must come from the individual's commitment to a just society in which all talents and abilities were used to the full. He desired a society in which the interests of the individual and society were identical and thought this could be achieved because individuals ultimately wanted to promote the common good. He believed it important to balance the rights of the individual with their duty to society, expressing the view that Western countries placed too much of an emphasis on individual rights; he regarded what he saw as the ensuing self-centred materialism as repulsive. To determine what balance to strike between the freedom of the individual and their responsibilities to society, he turned to the ideas of Genevan philosopher Jean-Jacques Rousseau. His ideas on societal collectivity may also have been influenced by the work of the social anthropologist Ralph Piddington, under whom Nyerere studied at Edinburgh. It was Nyerere's belief that Africa would resolve the tension between the individual and society, a balance which other continents had failed to achieve.

Nyerere detested elitism and sought to reflect that attitude in the manner in which he conducted himself as president. He was cautious to prevent the replacement of the colonial elite with an indigenous elite, and to this end insisted that the most educated sectors of the Tanzanian population should remain fully integrated with society as a whole. He criticised the existence of aristocracy and the British monarchy. He endorsed the equality of the sexes, stating that "it is essential that our women live on terms of full equality with their fellow citizens who are men".

He remained dedicated to a belief in the rule of law. He stressed the need for hard work. Nyerere appealed to the idea of tradition when trying to convince Tanzanians of his ideas. He stated that Tanzania could only be developed "through the religion of socialism and self-reliance". He reiterated the ideas of freedom, equality, and unity as being central to his concept of African socialism.

==== Socialism and Christianity ====
Socialism is concerned with man's life in this society. A man's relationship with God is a personal matter for him and him alone; his beliefs about the hereafter are his own affair.

— Julius Nyerere on socialism and religion

Nyerere's belief in socialism was retained after his socialist reforms failed to generate economic growth. He stated that "They keep saying you've failed. But what is wrong with urging people to pull together? Did Christianity fail because the world is not all Christian?"

Much of Nyerere's political ideology was inspired by his Christian belief, although he stipulated the view that one did not have to be a Christian to be a socialist:

There is not the slightest necessity for people to study metaphysics and decide whether there is one God, many Gods, or no God, before they can be socialist... What matters in socialism and to socialists is that you should care about a particular kind of social relationship on this earth. Why you care is your own affair.

Elsewhere, he declared that "socialism is secular".

Trevor Huddleston thought that Nyerere could be considered both a Christian humanist, and a Christian socialist. In his speeches and writings, Nyerere frequently quoted from the Bible, and in a 1970 address to the headquarters of the Maryknoll Mission, he argued that the Roman Catholic Church must involve itself in "the rebellion against those social structures and economic organizations which condemn men to poverty, humiliation and degradation", warning that if it failed to do so then it would lose relevance and "the Christian religion will degenerate into a series of superstitions accepted by the fearful". Despite his personal religious commitments, he espoused freedom of religion and the right for individuals to change their religious adherence.

== Personality and personal life ==
Those who knew Nyerere in Edinburgh recall him as 'not the usual type', 'a very decent fellow', 'of a very independent turn of mind', 'a delightful person; a student with a clearly evident awareness of opportunity to learn; a quiet, likeable young man of integrity', and 'a quiet, unassuming person... who drew no attention to himself in the way some students do'.

— Biographer Thomas Molony

Smith described Nyerere as "a slight, wiry man with a high forehead and a toothbrush moustache". He was described as an eloquent speaker, and a skilled debater, with Bjerk describing him as having "a scholar's mind". According to Molony, Nyerere "articulated his sometimes complex ideas in a simple and logical style of speechwriting." Nyerere was a modest man who was shy regarding the personality cult that followers established around him. In rejecting the personality cult, he for instance rejected ideas that statues be built to him. In a 1963 memorandum, he called on colleagues to help him in "stamping out the disease of pomposity" in Tanzanian society. As president, he for instance did not like to be referred to as either "Your Excellency" or "Dr Nyerere". Most staff members referred to him as "Mzee", a Swahili word meaning "old man". Smith noted that Nyerere had a "respect for spartan living" and an "abhorrence of luxury"; in his later years he always travelled by economy class. Bjerk described to Nyerere as giving "meandering speeches spiced with barbed humor."

Assessing his early life, Molony described Nyerere as "down-to-earth, principled, and had a strong sense of fairness. He was modest and unpretentious. In contrast to a good number of his contemporaries at Tabora Boys, Nyerere was neither arrogant nor conceited." In focusing heavily on his studies, some regarded him as "a touch precocious", or even as a swot or a bore; in addition, Molony noted, Nyerere could be "manipulative at times, increasingly shrewd with experience, and always tenacious". Bjerk noted that Nyerere "delighted in wry irony", and "wore his emotions on his sleeve. His joy, anger, and sadness often poured out into public view".

Huddleston recalled conversations with Nyerere as being "exciting and stimulating", with the Tanzanian leader focusing on world issues rather than talking about himself. In Huddleston's view, Nyerere was "a great human being who has always treasured his human-ness (his humanity if you like) more deeply than his office". For Huddleston, Nyerere displayed much humility, a trait that was "rare indeed" among politicians and statesmen. Molony noted that, in Edinburgh, Nyerere was "quiet and fairly unremarkable, and therefore forgettable", "an unobtrusive and quietly competitive young man who kept his ambitions to himself."

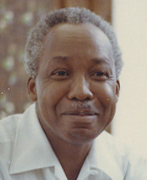
Nyerere in 1976

Nyerere's secretary, Joseph Namata, said that the leader "jokes about everything" and "can shout if he is angry". When planners suggested infrastructure developments for his home area, Nyerere rejected the proposals, not wanting to present the appearance of giving favours to it. Nyerere ensured that his parents' resting places were maintained. Smith referred to Nyerere as "a scholar at heart". In later life, Twining described Nyerere as "a very shrewd politician, an emotionalist... he is not greedy, not corrupt; I think he is a good man." Molony suggested that there was "a very shrewd side to his character", in that he was capable of playing to his audience by portraying himself as "the betrayed righteous figure, employing melodrama and even extortion to get what he wanted".

The style of suit that Nyerere wore was widely imitated in Tanzania, which led to it being known as a "Tanzanian suit". Many European and American observers believed it similar to a Mao suit and interpreted it as evidence for Nyerere's perceived desire for greater links with the Marxist–Leninist government in China. Nyerere objected to the tendency in Western countries to view Africa through the prism of Cold War politics. After the formation of Tanzania, Nyerere took to wearing a style of Zanzibaran hat called a kofia. In later life, he carried a small ebony stick known as a fimbo which served as a symbol of his authority.

Nyerere published widely. He wrote poetry, and translated William Shakespeare's plays Julius Caesar and The Merchant of Venice into Swahili, publishing these in 1961 and 1972 respectively. In later life, he—like many other Anglophone African statesmen—was an avid listener of the BBC World Service broadcasts. According to Smith, Nyerere had "a great fondness for British character and eccentricity".

Raised as a practitioner of Zanaki traditional religion, Nyerere converted to Catholicism at the age of 20 and remained a practitioner throughout his life. Christianity strongly influenced Nyerere's life and political beliefs. Nyerere described Christianity as "a revolutionary creed" but believed that its message had often been corrupted by churches. He liked to attend Mass in the early mornings, and while in Edinburgh enjoyed spending time sitting quietly in church. There is some evidence that while in Scotland, he considered ordination as a Catholic priest. He avoided Christian sectarianism and was friends with Christians of other denominations. Into his later life, he regularly attended Mass.

With his wife Maria Gabriel, Nyerere had seven children. When Nyerere was president, he insisted that his children go to state school and receive no special privileges. Two of his children suffered from mental illness. During the 1970s, Nyerere's relationship with his wife became strained and she moved to live with her sister for a while. He had 26 grandchildren.

== Cause for canonization ==
In January 2005, the Diocese of Musoma opened the cause for the canonization of Nyerere. He is afforded the title Servant of God. The postulator for Nyerere is Dr. Waldery Hilgeman.

== Reception and legacy ==
[Nyerere had] a legacy which continues to inspire millions of people in Tanzania and elsewhere especially in other parts of Africa. But it is also a legacy that has drawn mixed reactions from many other people, depending on how they saw him as a leader and the kind of policies he pursued.

— Godfrey Mwakikagile, 2006

Within Tanzania, Nyerere has been termed the "Father of the Nation", and was also known as Mwalimu (teacher). He gained recognition for the successful merger between Tanganyika and Zanzibar, and for leaving Tanzania as a united and stable state. Molony noted that Nyerere was "often depicted as Tanganyika's wunderkind", and is "remembered as one of Africa's most respected statesmen". A Tanzanian African studies scholar named Godfrey Mwakikagile stated that it was Nyerere's ideals of "equality and social justice" which "sustained Tanzania and earned it a reputation as one of the most stable and peaceful countries in Africa, and one of the most united; a rare feat on this turbulent continent." For Mwakikagile, Nyerere was "one of the world's most influential leaders of the twentieth century".

Nyerere was remembered "in African nationalist history as an uncompromising socialist"; Molony stated that "Nyerere's contribution to socialism was to make it African; and, in his eyes at least, to bring 'traditional' communal societies into the modern world." According to the historian W. O. Maloba, through his writing Nyerere became "one of the most respected contributors to the expanding literature on African Socialism". Smith noted that through his regular tours of Tanzania, Nyerere "has probably spoken directly to as large a percentage of his countrymen as any head of state on earth". In Pratt's view, Nyerere had been "a leader of unquestionable integrity who whatever his policy errors, was profoundly committed" to the welfare of his people. Bjerk characterised him as being "neither saint nor tyrant, Nyerere was a politician who kept his integrity and vision in a harsh and changing world." Bjerk added that Nyerere was "a brilliant intellectual, but some of his policies seem disastrously misguided to us today [2017]." Bjerk noted that "Nyerere stabilized his government and kept the country at peace", something not achieved by most of Tanzania's neighbours.

Richard Turnbull, the last British governor of Tanganyika, described Nyerere as having "a tremendous adherence to principle" and exhibiting "rather a Gandhian streak". The scholar of education J. Roger Carter noted that Nyerere's peaceful withdrawal from the leadership "suggests a leader of unusual quality and a national spirit, largely of his own creation, of some maturity". The Russian historian Nikolai Kosukhin described Nyerere as a leader of a "charismatic type, symbolizing the ideals and expectations of the people", in this manner comparing him to Gandhi, Nkrumah, Sun Yat Sen, and Senghor. For Kosukhin, Nyerere was "a recognized standard bearer of the struggle for African liberation and a tireless champion of the idea of equitable economic relations between the rich North and the developing South". In this way, Kosukhin thought, Nyerere "belongs not only to Tanzania and Africa, but also to all mankind". In Mwakikagile's view, Nyerere "epitomized the best" among "the founding fathers" of independence African states, citing him alongside such "Big Men" as Kenyatta, Nkrumah, Sekou Toure, Patrice Lumumba, and Modibo Keita.

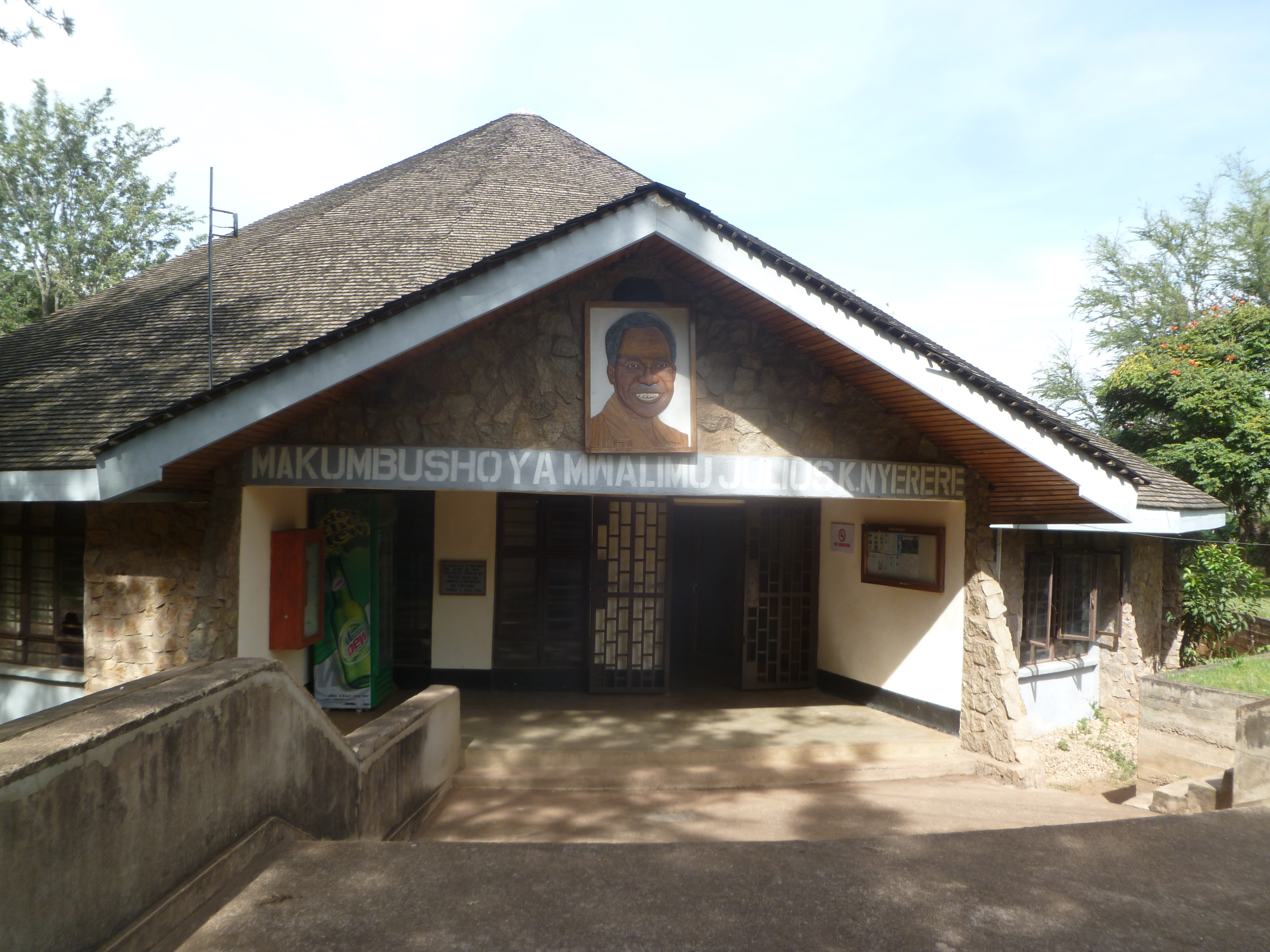
Entrance of the Mwalimu Nyerere Museum Centre in Butiama dedicated to Nyerere

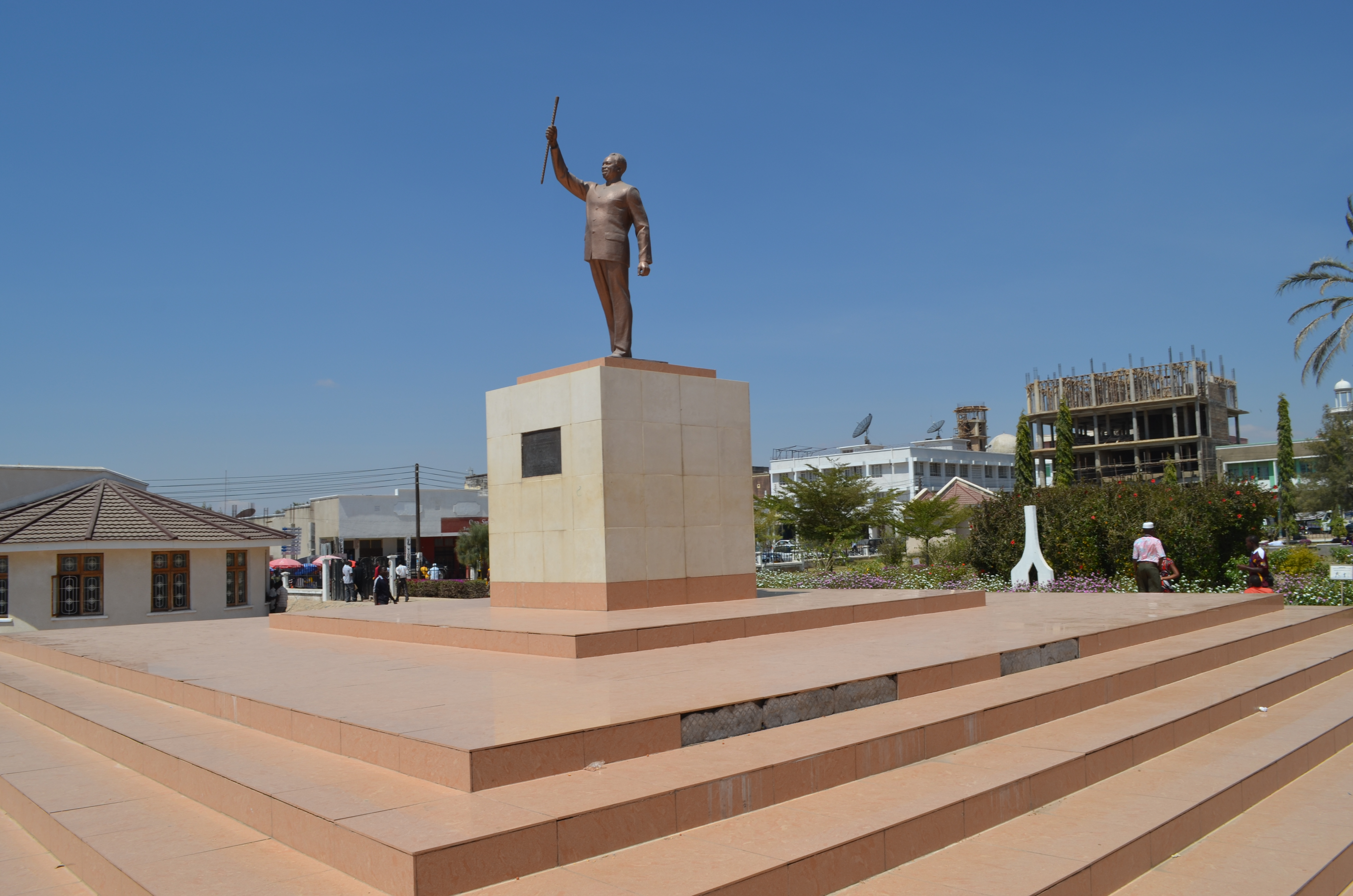
A statue stands in the centre of Nyerere Square in Dodoma, Tanzania

Bureaucrats from TANU subsequently established a cult of personality around Nyerere. By the time he died, he was increasingly viewed as a symbol of the nation. A museum and mausoleum devoted to him were built in Butiama. Posthumously, the Catholic Church in Tanzania began the processing of beatifying Nyerere, hoping to have him recognised as a saint. A delegation from the Vatican arrived in Tanzania to investigate these calls in January 2005. Although his ujamaa ideals were largely abandoned by the governments that succeeded him, the historian Sidney J. Lemelle argued that these values could be identified in the later Tanzanian hip hop and rap scene.

At his death, Western commentators repeatedly claimed that Nyerere had served his people poorly as president. Many Western governments and economists used Nyerere's Tanzania as an example of why, to ensure economic growth, post-colonial African states should embrace limited state regulation and a market economy linked in with the international capitalist economy. Bjerk noted that although Nyerere was "an advocate for democracy", his pursuit of a democracy adapted to East African society led to him forming "a one-party state that regularly violated democratic values". He thought that "few would deny" that Nyerere "became a dictator", although noted that "he maintained his authority without mass violence", unlike many other dictatorial leaders in Africa. In 2007, the politician Ismail Jussa said of Nyerere: "He wanted to preserve power. Maybe he did not kill people as other dictators, but by suppressing dissent he was not different to any other dictator." Shivji disagreed, stating that "to be sure, Nyerere was not a dictator", although described the policies which Nyerere enacted as being authoritarian.

It is said that Nyerere was great master of a Masonic lodge. His support to Frelimo when the latter processed and imprisoned Mozambican politicians is the basis of criticism in Mozambique today.

After his death, Nyerere received far less attention than contemporary African leaders like Kenyatta, Nkrumah, and Mandela. Much of the literature published about him has been un-critical and hagiographic, ignoring elements of his life that might not be considered flattering. Also often omitted from accounts of his life are the more ruthless elements of his rule, especially the imprisonment of some political dissenters. In 2009, his life was portrayed in a South African production by Imruh Bakari titled The Legacy of Julius Kambarage Nyerere. The University of Edinburgh, Nyerere's alma mater, put up a plaque in his name on its School of Social and Political Science, and provides three Julius Nyerere Masters Scholarships each year.

== See also ==
- List of presidents of Tanganyika
- List of prime ministers of Tanzania
- List of awards and honours received by Julius Nyerere

Party political offices
Preceded by Himself as Chairman of TANU	National Chairman of Chama Cha Mapinduzi; 1977–1990	Succeeded by Ali Hassan Mwinyi
New political party	Chairman of TANU; 1954–1977	Succeeded by Himself as Chairman of CCM
Political offices
Preceded by Himself (as President of Tanganyika); Abeid Karume (as President of Zanzibar)	President of Tanzania; 1964–1985	Succeeded by Ali Hassan Mwinyi
Preceded by Elizabeth II (as Queen)	President of Tanganyika; 1962–1964	Succeeded by Himself as President of Tanzania
Preceded by Himself as Chief Minister of Tanganyika	Prime Minister of Tanganyika; 1961–1962	Succeeded by Rashidi Kawawa
New title	Chief Minister of Tanganyika; 1960–1961	Succeeded by Himself as Prime Minister of Tanganyika
Diplomatic posts
Preceded by Mengistu Haile Mariam	Chairperson of the Organization of African Unity; 1984–1985	Succeeded by Abdou Diouf
