= List of heads of state of Tanzania =

This is a list of the heads of state of Tanzania, from the independence of Tanganyika in 1961 to the present day.

From 1961 to 1962 the head of state under the Constitution of 1961 was the queen of Tanganyika, Elizabeth II, who was also the monarch of other Commonwealth realms. The monarch was represented in Tanganyika by a governor-general. Tanganyika became a republic within the Commonwealth under the Constitution of 1962 and the monarch and governor-general were replaced by an executive president. After the Zanzibar Revolution, which overthrew the Sultanate of Zanzibar in January 1964, the People's Republic of Zanzibar united with mainland Tanganyika to form the United Republic of Tanganyika and Zanzibar, which was later renamed to the United Republic of Tanzania.

== Monarch (1961–1962) ==
The succession to the throne was the same as the succession to the British throne.

No.	Portrait	Name (Birth–Death)	Reign			Royal House	Prime minister(s)	Ref.
No.	Portrait	Name (Birth–Death)	Took office	Left office	Time in office	Royal House	Prime minister(s)	Ref.
1		Queen Elizabeth II (1926–2022)	9 December 1961	9 December 1962	1 year	Windsor	Nyerere; Kawawa	

=== Governor-general ===
The governor-general was the representative of the monarch in Tanganyika and exercised most of the powers of the monarch. The governor-general was appointed for an indefinite term, serving at the pleasure of the monarch. Since Tanganyika was granted independence by the Tanganyika Independence Act 1961 (10 & 11 Eliz. 2. c. 1), rather than being first established as a semi-autonomous dominion and later promoted to independence as defined by the Statute of Westminster 1931, the governor-general was to be always appointed solely on the advice of the Cabinet of Tanganyika without the involvement of the British government. As Tanganyika became a republic before Richard Turnbull, the former colonial governor, was replaced, this has never happened. In the event of a vacancy the chief justice would have served as the officer administering the government.

No.	Portrait	Name (Birth–Death)	Term of office			Monarch	Prime minister(s)	Ref.
No.	Portrait	Name (Birth–Death)	Took office	Left office	Time in office	Monarch	Prime minister(s)	Ref.
1		Sir Richard Turnbull (1909–1998)	9 December 1961	9 December 1962	1 year	Elizabeth II	Nyerere; Kawawa	

== Republic (1962–present) ==
Political parties

Tanganyika African National Union (TANU)
Chama Cha Mapinduzi (CCM)

Symbols

^{§} Elected unopposed

^{†} Died in office

=== President of Tanganyika ===
Under the Constitution of 1962, the first constitution of the Republic of Tanganyika, the president replaced the monarch as executive head of state. In the event of a vacancy the Vice-President of Tanganyika served as acting president.

No.	Portrait	Name (Birth–Death)	Term of office			Political party	Elected	Cabinet(s)	Ref.
No.	Portrait	Name (Birth–Death)	Took office	Left office	Time in office	Political party	Elected	Cabinet(s)	Ref.
1		Julius Nyerere (1922–1999)	9 December 1962	29 October 1964	1 year, 325 days	TANU	1962	Nyerere I	

=== President of Tanzania ===
Under the Constitution of 1964, the first constitution of the United Republic of Tanzania, the president replaced the president of Tanganyika and the president of Zanzibar as executive head of state. The president was elected by a yes-or-no confirmation referendum for a five-year term after being nominated by a TANU/CCM electoral college. Following the restoration of a multi-party system in 1992, multi-candidate elections were introduced in 1995, with the president elected via First-past-the-post voting. In the event of a vacancy the vice-president serves as president for the remainder of the presidential term.

Former president John Magufuli took a monthly salary of 9 million Tanzanian shillings (approximately US$4,000).

No.	Portrait	Name (Birth–Death)	Term of office			Political party	Elected	Cabinet(s)	Prime minister(s)	Ref.
No.	Portrait	Name (Birth–Death)	Took office	Left office	Time in office	Political party	Elected	Cabinet(s)	Prime minister(s)	Ref.
1		Julius Nyerere (1922–1999)	1 November 1964	5 November 1985	21 years, 4 days	TANU (until 1977)	1965^{[§]}	Nyerere II	Kawawa	
1		Julius Nyerere (1922–1999)	1 November 1964	5 November 1985	21 years, 4 days	TANU (until 1977)	1970^{[§]}	Nyerere III	Kawawa	
1		Julius Nyerere (1922–1999)	1 November 1964	5 November 1985	21 years, 4 days	TANU (until 1977)	1975^{[§]}	Nyerere IV	Kawawa	
1		Julius Nyerere (1922–1999)	1 November 1964	5 November 1985	21 years, 4 days	CCM	1980^{[§]}	Nyerere V	Kawawa	
1		Julius Nyerere (1922–1999)	1 November 1964	5 November 1985	21 years, 4 days	CCM	1980^{[§]}	Nyerere V	Sokoine	
1		Julius Nyerere (1922–1999)	1 November 1964	5 November 1985	21 years, 4 days	CCM	1980^{[§]}	Nyerere V	Msuya	
1		Julius Nyerere (1922–1999)	1 November 1964	5 November 1985	21 years, 4 days	CCM	1980^{[§]}	Nyerere V	Sokoine	
1		Julius Nyerere (1922–1999)	1 November 1964	5 November 1985	21 years, 4 days	CCM	1980^{[§]}	Nyerere V	Salim	
2		Ali Hassan Mwinyi (1925–2024)	5 November 1985	23 November 1995	10 years, 18 days	CCM	1985^{[§]}	Mwinyi I	Warioba	
2		Ali Hassan Mwinyi (1925–2024)	5 November 1985	23 November 1995	10 years, 18 days	CCM	1990	Mwinyi II	Malecela	
2		Ali Hassan Mwinyi (1925–2024)	5 November 1985	23 November 1995	10 years, 18 days	CCM	1990	Mwinyi II	Msuya	
3		Benjamin Mkapa (1938–2020)	23 November 1995	21 December 2005	10 years, 28 days	CCM	1995	Mkapa I	Msuya	
3		Benjamin Mkapa (1938–2020)	23 November 1995	21 December 2005	10 years, 28 days	CCM	1995	Mkapa I	Sumaye	
3		Benjamin Mkapa (1938–2020)	23 November 1995	21 December 2005	10 years, 28 days	CCM	2000	Mkapa II	Sumaye	
4		Jakaya Kikwete (born 1950)	21 December 2005	5 November 2015	9 years, 319 days	CCM	2005	Kikwete I	Sumaye	
4		Jakaya Kikwete (born 1950)	21 December 2005	5 November 2015	9 years, 319 days	CCM	2005	Kikwete I	Lowassa	
4		Jakaya Kikwete (born 1950)	21 December 2005	5 November 2015	9 years, 319 days	CCM	2010	Kikwete II	Pinda	
5		John Magufuli (1959–2021)	5 November 2015	17 March 2021^{[†]}	5 years, 132 days	CCM	2015	Magufuli I	Majaliwa	
5		John Magufuli (1959–2021)	5 November 2015	17 March 2021^{[†]}	5 years, 132 days	CCM	2020	Magufuli II	Majaliwa	
6		Samia Suluhu Hassan (born 1960)	19 March 2021	Incumbent	5 years, 158 days	CCM	2025	Suluhu	Majaliwa	
6		Samia Suluhu Hassan (born 1960)	19 March 2021	Incumbent	5 years, 158 days	CCM	2025	Suluhu	Nchemba	

== Standards ==
Governor-General's standard

Presidential standard

== See also ==
- Politics of Tanzania
- List of governors of Tanganyika
- President of Tanzania
- Vice-President of Tanzania
- Prime Minister of Tanzania
  - List of prime ministers of Tanzania
- List of sultans of Zanzibar
- President of Zanzibar
- Vice President of Zanzibar
- List of heads of government of Zanzibar
