= Lucy Lameck =

Tanzanian politician

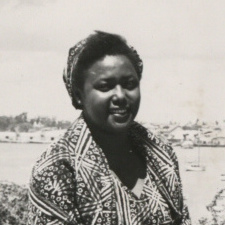
- Lucy Lameck

Deputy Minister of Health
- In office 1967–1972
- President: Julius Nyerere

Deputy Minister for Cooperatives and Community Development
- In office 1965–1970
- President: Julius Nyerere

Parliamentary Secretary of Cooperatives and Community Development
- In office 1962–1965
- President: Julius Nyerere
- Prime Minister: Rashidi Kawawa

Member of National Assembly
- In office 1980–1992

Personal details
- Born: Lucy Selina Lameck Somi; 1932 Kilimanjaro, Tanganyika
- Died: 21 March 1993 (aged 60–61)
- Cause of death: Kidney disease
- Party: Tanganyika African National Union
- Education: Ruskin College, Oxford
- Occupation: Nurse, secretary, politician
- Known for: First female Minister in Tanganyika/Tanzania

Lucy Lameck (1934–21 March 1993) was a Tanzanian politician, who was the first woman to hold a Ministerial post in the government. Born to a farming family, she trained as a nurse before becoming involved in politics and attending Ruskin College, Oxford, through a scholarship. She first entered the Tanganyika National Assembly in 1960, before being elected to the Tanzania National Assembly in 1965. With the exception of 1975 to 1980, she continued to hold a seat there until her death in 1993. She is seen as a role model, having worked throughout her life to improve conditions within the country for women.

== Early life ==
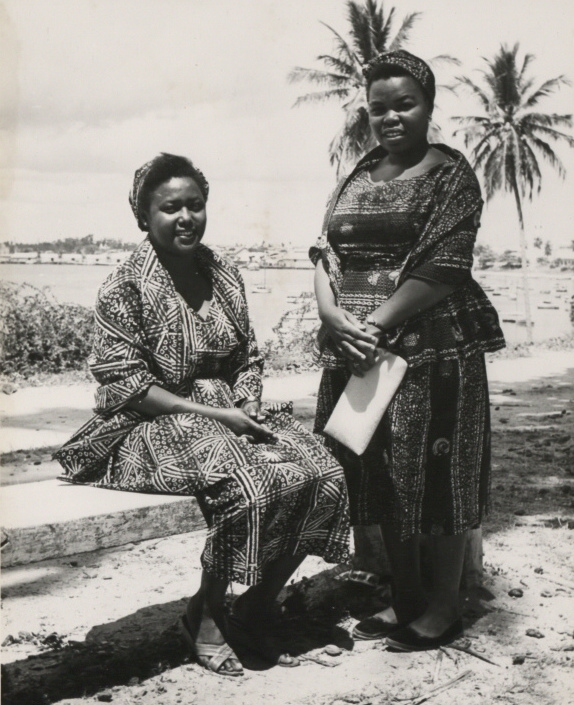
Lucy Lameck and Victoria Kopney modelling proposed National dress

Lucy Selina Lameck Somi, later known as Lucy Lameck, was born in 1934 to Chagga parents near to the Kilimanjaro ward in the British territory of Tanganyika (modern day Tanzania). She came from a family of farmers, who were politically active and once hosted political activist Julius Nyerere. She attended Kilema Catholic Mission School, run by the Missionary Sisters of Our Lady of Africa. After training as a nurse in 1950, she did not want to take part in the British colonial medical system, and so instead began working as a secretary instead. Between 1955 and 1957, she worked for the Kilimanjaro Native Cooperative Union, and began to become involved in politics, working with the Tanganyika African National Union. She was the head of the womans section of the TANU and she designed a national dress for Tanganyika. She had been one of the first attendees when TANU opened a branch in Moshi.

== Political career ==
These political activities resulted in a scholarship from the Trades Union Congress in Britain to study politics at Ruskin College, Oxford. While in the UK, she spoke at East Africa House in London, and also completed a semester at Western Michigan University in the United States. Sponsored by the Delta Sigma Theta sorority, she conducted a tour of African American communities across the America in 1960, to investigate the economic differences between the United States and Tanganyika. This was while the sorority was under the leadership of Dr. Jean Noble, who sought to increase ties between African Americans and Africans. When she spoke of the British Colonialism of the country, she hoped that it would be "packed up and shipped back to England" shortly. Lameck described her plans with Jet magazine to run for election in Tanganyika's first elections later that year. She also added that the race relations in her country were better than she had seen in America.

She returned to Tanganyika, where she was appointed to a seat in the National Assembly by Nyerere, who had become the Chief Minister. Between 1962 and 1965, she was Parliamentary Secretary of Cooperatives and Community Development. This was the first ministerial post held by a woman in Tanganyika or Tanzania. When the newly formed Tanzania held elections in 1965, she ran and won a seat in the National Assembly, holding dual posts of Deputy Minister for Cooperatives and Community Development between 1965 and 1970, and Deputy Minister of Health between 1967 and 1972. She held her seat in the 1970 elections, but lost it in 1975.

Lameck won the seat back again following the general election in 1980, and continued to hold it until her death. She introduced a variety of legislation, including those to improve the conditions for women within the country. She died on 21 March 1993 from kidney disease. Her funeral with full honours was attended by Nyerere, President of Zanzibar Salmin Amour and Prime Minister of Tanzania John Malecela. She has since been considered a role model for women, in particular female politicians, within Tanzania.
