= History of Tanzania =

The modern-day African Great Lakes state of Tanzania dates formally from 1964, when it was formed out of the union of the much larger mainland territory of Tanganyika and the coastal archipelago of Zanzibar. The former was a colony and part of German East Africa from the 1880s to 1919 when, under the League of Nations, it became a British mandate. It served as a British colony, providing financial help, munitions, and soldiers. In 1947, Tanganyika became a United Nations Trust Territory under British administration, a status it kept until its independence in 1961. The island of Zanzibar thrived as a trading hub, successively controlled by the Portuguese, the Sultanate of Oman, and then as a British protectorate by the end of the nineteenth century.

Julius Nyerere, independence leader and "baba wa taifa" (father of the nation) for Tanganyika, ruled the country for decades, while Abeid Amaan Karume, governed Zanzibar as its president and Vice President of the United Republic of Tanzania. Following Nyerere's retirement in 1985, various political and economic reforms began. He was succeeded in office by President Ali Hassan Mwinyi.

== Prehistory ==
=== Early Stone Age ===
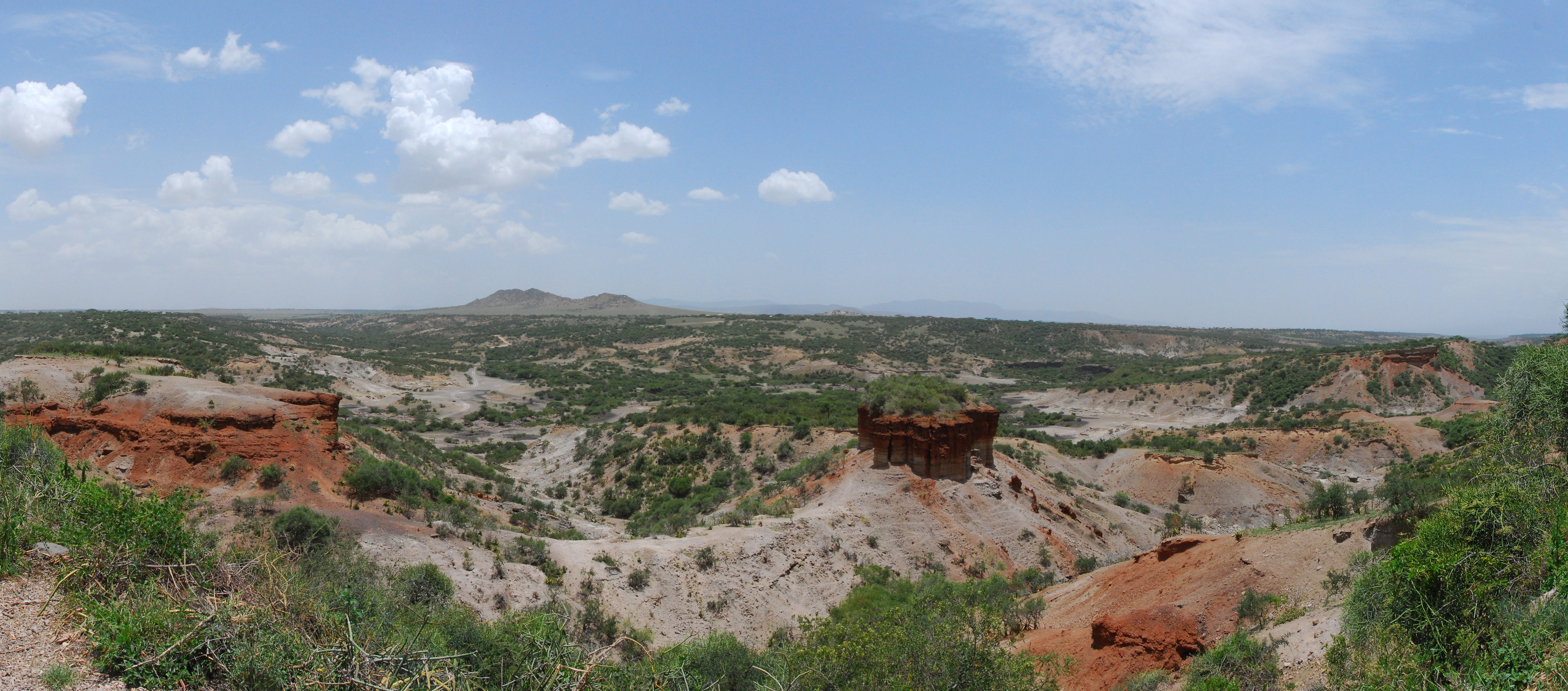
Olduvai Gorge site also known as "The Cradle of Mankind"

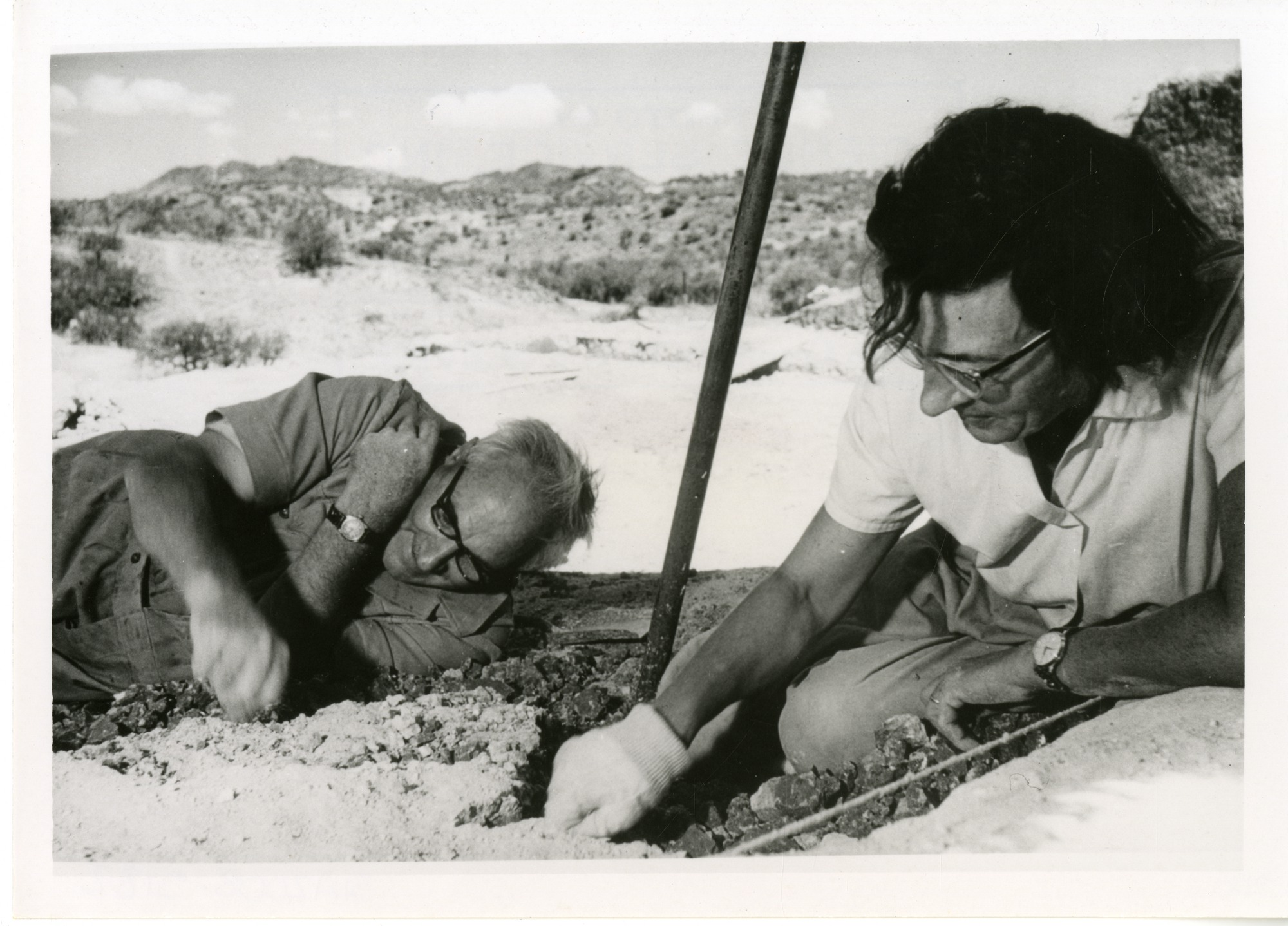
Louis and Mary Leakey

Tanzania is home to some of the oldest hominid settlements unearthed by archaeologists. Prehistoric stone tools and fossils have been found in and around Olduvai Gorge in northern Tanzania, an area often referred to as "The Cradle of Mankind". Acheulian stone tools were discovered there in 1931 by Louis Leakey, after he had correctly identified the rocks brought back by Hans Reck to Germany from his 1913 Olduvai expedition as stone tools. The same year, Louis Leakey found older, more primitive stone tools in Olduvai Gorge. These were the first examples of the oldest human technology ever discovered in Africa, and were subsequently known throughout the world as Oldowan after Olduvai Gorge.

The first hominid skull in Olduvai Gorge was discovered by Mary Leakey in 1959, and named Zinj or Nutcracker Man, the first example of Paranthropus boisei, and is thought to be more than 1.8 million years old. Other finds including Homo habilis fossils were subsequently made. At nearby Laetoli the oldest known hominid footprints, the Laetoli footprints, were discovered by Mary Leakey in 1978, and estimated to be approximately 3.6 million years old and probably made by Australopithecus afarensis. The oldest hominid fossils ever discovered in Tanzania also come from Laetoli and are the 3.6 to 3.8 million year old remains of Australopithecus afarensis—Louis Leakey had found what he thought was a baboon tooth at Laetoli in 1935 (which was not identified as afarensis until 1979), a fragment of hominid jaw with three teeth was found there by Kohl-Larsen in 1938–39, and in 1974–75 Mary Leakey recovered 42 teeth and several jawbones from the site.

=== Middle Stone Age ===
Mumba Cave in northern Tanzania includes a Middle Stone Age (MSA) to Later Stone Age (LSA) archaeological sequence. The MSA represents the time period in Africa during which many archaeologists see the origins of modern human behavior.

=== Later Stone Age and Pastoral Neolithic ===
Reaching back approximately 10,000 years in the Later Stone Age, Tanzania is believed to have been populated by hunter-gatherer communities, probably Khoisan-speaking people. Between approximately 4,000 to 3,000 years ago, during a time period known as the Pastoral Neolithic, pastoralists who relied on cattle, sheep, goats, and donkeys came into Tanzania from the north. Two archaeological cultures are known from this time period, the Savanna Pastoral Neolithic (whose peoples may have spoken a Southern Cushitic language) and the Elmenteitan (whose peoples may have spoken a Southern Nilotic language). Luxmanda is the largest and southernmost-known Pastoral Neolithic site in Tanzania.

=== Iron Age ===
Approximately 2000 years ago, Bantu-speaking people began to arrive from western Africa in a series of migrations collectively referred to as the Bantu expansion. These groups brought and developed ironworking skills, agriculture, and new ideas of social and political organization. They absorbed many of the Cushitic peoples who had preceded them, as well as most of the remaining Khoisan-speaking inhabitants. Later, Nilotic pastoralists arrived, and continued to immigrate into the area through to the eighteenth century.

One of Tanzania's most important Iron Age archeological sites is Engaruka in the Great Rift Valley, which includes an irrigation and cultivation system.

== Early coastal history ==
Travellers and merchants from the Persian Gulf and Western India have visited the East African coast since early in the first millennium CE. Greek texts such as the Periplus of the Erythraean Sea and Ptolemy's Geography list a string of market places (emporia) along the coast. Finds of Roman-era coins along the coast confirm the existence of trade, and Ptolomey's Geography refers to a town of Rhapta as "metropolis" of a political entity called Azania. Archaeologists have not yet succeeded in identifying the location of Rhapta, although many believe it lies deeply buried in the silt of the delta of the Rufiji River. A long documentary silence follows these ancient texts, and it is not until Arab geographical treatises were written about the coast that our information resumes.

Remains of those towns' material culture demonstrate that they arose from indigenous roots, not from foreign settlement. And the language that was spoken in them, Swahili (now Tanzania's national language), is a member of the Bantu language family that spread from the northern Kenya coast well before significant Arab presence was felt in the region. By the beginning of the second millennium CE the Swahili towns conducted a thriving trade that linked Africans in the interior with trade partners throughout the Indian Ocean. From c. 1200 to 1500 CE, the town of Kilwa, on Tanzania's southern coast, was perhaps the wealthiest and most powerful of these towns, presiding over what some scholars consider the "golden age" of Swahili civilization. In the early 14th century, Ibn Battuta, a Berber traveller from North Africa, visited Kilwa and proclaimed it one of the best cities in the world. Islam was practised on the Swahili coast as early as the eighth or ninth century CE.

In 1498, Portuguese explorer Vasco da Gama became the first known European to reach the African Great Lakes coast; he stayed for 32 days. In 1505 the Portuguese captured the island of Zanzibar. Portuguese control lasted until the early eighteenth century, when Arabs from Oman established a foothold in the region. Assisted by Omani Arabs, the indigenous coastal dwellers succeeded in driving the Portuguese from the area north of the Ruvuma River by the early eighteenth century. Claiming the coastal strip, Omani Sultan Seyyid Said moved his capital to Zanzibar City in 1840. He focused on the island and developed trade routes that stretched as far as Lake Tanganyika and Central Africa. During this time, Zanzibar became the centre for the Indian Ocean slave trade. Due to the Arab and Persian domination at this later time, many Europeans misconstrued the nature of Swahili civilization as a product of Arab colonization. However, this misunderstanding has begun to dissipate over the past 40 years as Swahili civilization is becoming recognized as principally African in origin.

== Tanganyika (1850–1890) ==
Tanganyika as a geographical and political entity did not take shape before the period of High Imperialism; its name only came into use after German East Africa was transferred to the United Kingdom as a mandate by the League of Nations in 1920. What is referred to here, therefore, is the history of the region that was to become Tanzania. A part of the Great Lakes region, namely the western shore of Lake Victoria consisted of many small kingdoms, most notably Karagwe and Buzinza, which were dominated by their more powerful neighbors Rwanda, Burundi, and Buganda.

European exploration of the interior began in the mid-19th century. In 1848 the German missionary Johannes Rebmann became the first European to see Mount Kilimanjaro. British explorers Richard Burton and John Speke crossed the interior to Lake Tanganyika in June 1857. In January 1866, the Scottish explorer and missionary David Livingstone, who crusaded against the slave trade, went to Zanzibar, from where he sought the source of the Nile, and established his last mission at Ujiji on the shores of Lake Tanganyika. After having lost contact with the outside world for years, he was "found" there on 10 November 1871. Henry Morton Stanley, who had been sent in a publicity stunt to find him by the New York Herald newspaper, greeted him with the now famous words "Dr Livingstone, I presume?" In 1877, the first of a series of Belgian expeditions arrived on Zanzibar. In the course of these expeditions, in 1879 a station was founded in Kigoma on the eastern bank of Lake Tanganyika, soon to be followed by the station of Mpala on the opposite western bank. Both stations were founded in the name of the Comite D'Etudes Du Haut Congo, a predecessor organization of the Congo Free State. German colonial interests were first advanced in 1884. Karl Peters, who formed the Society for German Colonization, concluded a series of treaties by which tribal chiefs ceded territory to the society. Prince Otto von Bismarck's government in 1885 granted imperial protection to the German East Africa Company established by Peters with Bismark's encouragement.

At the Berlin Conference of 1885, the fact that Kigoma had been established and supplied from Zanzibar and Bagamoyo led to the inclusion of German East Africa into the territory of the Conventional Basin of the Congo, to Belgium's advantage. At the table in Berlin, contrary to widespread perception, Africa was not partitioned; rather, rules were established among the colonial powers and prospective colonial powers as how to proceed in the establishment of colonies and protectorates. While the Belgian interest soon concentrated on the Congo River, the British and Germans focused on Eastern Africa and in 1886 partitioned continental East Africa between themselves; the Sultanate of Zanzibar, now reduced to the islands of Zanzibar and Pemba, remained independent, for the moment. The Congo Free State was eventually to give up its claim on Kigoma (its oldest station in Central Africa) and on any territory to the east of Lake Tanganyika, to Germany.

== German East Africa ==
"A History of Tanzania" references that the Germans established a direct rule where German administrators controlled all aspects of the colony’s government. At the top of the administration was a governor who enforced laws, created local decrees, and controlled the military. The governor appointed district officers who were in charge of everything in their districts. Their responsibilities included collecting taxes, awarding punishment, and commanding the local police force. Lands with high populations often had economic potential. In these areas, the Germans forced out the occupants so they could develop these fertile lands for themselves. All resistance to the Germans in the interior ceased and they could now set out to organize German East Africa. They continued brutally to exercise their authority with disregard and contempt for existing local structures and traditions. While the German colonial administration brought cash crops, railroads, and roads to Tanganyika, European rule provoked African resistance. Between 1891 and 1894, the Hehe—led by Chief Mkwawa—resisted German expansion, but were eventually defeated. After a period of guerrilla warfare, Mkwawa was cornered and committed suicide in 1898.

=== Maji Maji resistance ===
Widespread discontent re-emerged, and in 1902 a movement against forced labour for a cotton scheme rejected by the local population started along the Rufiji River. The tension reached a breaking point in July 1905 when the Matumbi of Nandete led by Kinjikitile Ngwale revolted against the local administrators (akida) and suddenly the revolt grew wider from Dar Es Salaam to the Uluguru Mountains, the Kilombero Valley, the Mahenge and Makonde plateaux, the Ruvuma in the southernmost part and Kilwa, Songea, Masasi, and from Kilosa to Iringa down to the eastern shores of Lake Nyasa. The resistance culminated in the Maji Maji Resistance of 1905–1907. The resistance, which temporarily united a number of southern tribes ended only after an estimated 300,000 Africans had died from fighting or starvation. Research has shown that traditional hostilities played a large part in the resistance.

Germans had occupied the area since 1897 and totally altered many aspects of everyday life. They were actively supported by the missionaries who tried to destroy all signs of indigenous beliefs, notably by razing the 'mahoka' huts where the local population worshiped their ancestors' spirits and by ridiculing their rites, dances and other ceremonies. This would not be forgotten or forgiven; the first battle which broke out at Uwereka in September 1905 under the Governorship of Count Gustav Adolf von Götzen turned instantly into an all-out war with indiscriminate murders and massacres perpetrated by all sides against farmers, settlers, missionaries, planters, villages, indigenous people and peasants. Known as the Maji-Maji war with the main brunt borne by the Ngoni people, this was a merciless rebellion and by far the bloodiest in Tanganyika.

=== World War I ===
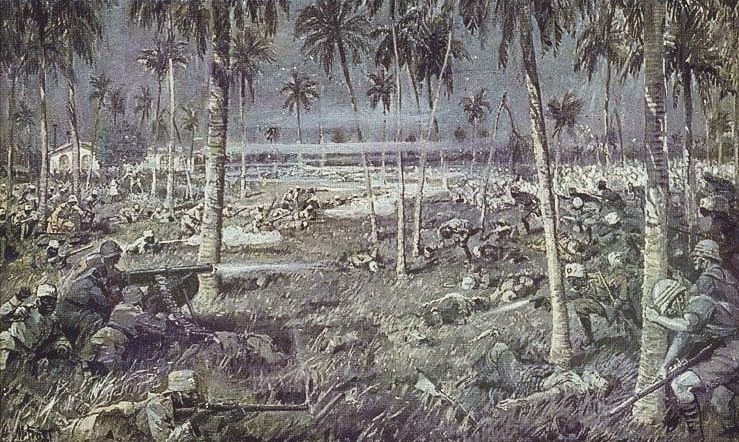
Battle of Tanga, fought between the British and Germans during World War I

Before the outbreak of the war, German East Africa had been prepared to resist any attack that could be made without extensive preparation. For the first year of hostilities, the Germans were strong enough to conduct offensive operations in their neighbours' territories by, for example, repeatedly attacking railways in British East Africa. The strength of German forces at the beginning of the war is uncertain. Lieutenant-General Jan Smuts, the commander of British forces in east Africa beginning in 1916, estimated them at 2,000 Germans and 16,000 Askaris. The white adult male population in 1913 numbered over 3,500 (exclusive of the German garrison). In addition, the indigenous population of over 7,000,000 formed a reservoir of manpower from which a force might be drawn, limited only by the supply of German officers and equipment. "There is no reason to doubt that the Germans made the best of this material during the ... nearly eighteen months which separated the outbreak of war from the invasion in force of their territory."

The geography of German East Africa also was a severe impediment to British and allied forces. The coastline offered few suitable points for landing and was backed by unhealthy swamps. The line of lakes and mountains to the west proved to be impenetrable. Belgian forces from the Belgian Congo had to be moved through Uganda. On the south, the Ruvuma River was fordable only its upper reaches. In the north, only one practicable pass about five miles wide existed between the Pare Mountains and Mount Kilimanjaro, and here the German forces had been digging in for eighteen months.

Germany commenced hostilities in 1914 by unsuccessfully attacking from the town of Tanga. The British then attacked the town in November 1914 but were thwarted by General Paul von Lettow-Vorbeck's forces at the Battle of Tanga. The British Royal Navy occupied Mafia Island in January 1915. However, the "attack on Tanga and the numerous smaller engagements that followed [showed] the strength ... of [German forces] and made it evident that a powerful force must be organized before the conquest of [German East Africa] could be ... undertaken. Such an enterprise had ... to await more favourable conditions on European battlefields and elsewhere. But in July, 1915, the last German troops in S.W. Africa capitulated ... and the nucleus of the requisite force ... became available." British forces from the northeast and southwest and Belgian forces from the northwest steadily attacked and defeated German forces beginning in January 1916. In October 1916, General Smuts wrote, "With the exception of the Mahenge Plateau [the Germans] have lost every healthy or valuable part of their Colony".

Cut-off from Germany, General Von Lettow by necessity conducted a guerilla campaign throughout 1917, living off the land and dispersing over a wide area. In December, the remaining German forces evacuated the colony by crossing the Ruvuma River into Portuguese Mozambique. Those forces were estimated at 320 German troops and 2,500 Askaris. 1,618 Germans and 5,482 Askaris were killed or captured during the last six months of 1917. In November 1918, his remaining force surrendered near present-day Mbala, Zambia consisting of 155 Europeans, 1,165 Askaris, 2,294 African porters etc., and 819 African women.

Under the Treaty of Versailles, Germany relinquished all her overseas possessions, including German East Africa. Britain lost 3,443 men in battle plus 6,558 men to disease. The equivalent numbers for Belgium were 683 and 1,300. Germany lost 734 Europeans and 1,798 Africans.

Von Lettow's scorched earth policy and the requisition of buildings meant a complete collapse of the Government's education system, though some mission schools managed to retain a semblance of instruction. Unlike the Belgian, British, French and Portuguese colonial masters in central Africa, Germany had developed an educational program for her Africans that involved elementary, secondary and vocational schools. "Instructor qualifications, curricula, textbooks, teaching materials, all met standards unmatched anywhere in tropical Africa." In 1924, ten years after the beginning of the First World War and six years into British rule, the visiting American Phelps-Stokes Commission reported: In regards to schools, the Germans have accomplished marvels. Some time must elapse before education attains the standard it had reached under the Germans. But by 1920, the Education Department consisted of 1 officer and 2 clerks with a budget equal to 1% of the country's revenue—less than the amount appropriated for the maintenance of Government House.

== British administration after World War I ==
In 1919, the population was estimated at 3,500,000.

The first British civilian administrator after the end of World War I was Sir Horace Archer Byatt CMG, appointed by Royal Commission on 31 January 1919. The colony was renamed Tanganyika Territory in January 1920. In September 1920 by the Tanganyika Order in Council, 1920, the initial boundaries of the territory, the Executive Council, and the offices of governor and commander-in-chief were established. The governor legislated by proclamation or ordinance until 1926.

Britain and Belgium signed an agreement regarding the border between Tanganyika and Ruanda-Urundi in 1924.

The administration of the Territory continued to be carried out under the terms of the mandate until its transfer to the Trusteeship System under the Charter of the United Nations by the Trusteeship Agreement of 13 December 1946.

=== British rule through indigenous authorities ===
Governor Byatt took measures to revive African institutions by encouraging limited local rule. He authorized the formation in 1922 of political clubs such as the Tanganyika Territory African Civil Service Association, which in 1929 became the Tanganyika African Association and later constituted the core of the nationalist movement. Under the Native Authority Ordinances of 1923, limited powers were granted to certain recognized chiefs who could also exercise powers granted by local customary law.

Sir Donald Cameron became the governor of Tanganyika in 1925. "His work ... was of great significance in the development of colonial administrative policy, being associated especially with the vigorous attempt to establish a system of 'Indirect Rule' through the traditional indigenous authorities." He was a major critic of Governor Byatt's policies about indirect rule, as evidenced by his Native Administration Memorandum No. 1, Principles of Native Administration and their Application.

In 1926, the Legislative Council was established with seven unofficial (including two Indians) and thirteen official members, whose function was to advise and consent to ordinances issued by the governor. In 1945, the first Africans were appointed to the council. The council was reconstituted in 1948 under Governor Edward Twining, with 15 unofficial members (7 Europeans, 4 Africans, and 4 Indians) and 14 official members. Julius Nyerere became one of the unofficial members in 1954. The council was again reconstituted in 1955 with 44 unofficial members (10 Europeans, 10 Africans, 10 Indians, and 14 government representatives) and 17 official members.

Governor Cameron in 1929 enacted the Native Courts Ordinance No. 5, which removed those courts from the jurisdiction of the colonial courts and provided for a system of appeals with final resort to the governor himself.

=== Railway development ===
In 1928, the Tabora to Mwanza railway line was opened to traffic. The line from Moshi to Arusha opened in 1930.

=== 1931 census ===
In 1931 a census established the population of Tanganyika at 5,022,640 natives, in addition to 32,398 Asians and 8,228 Europeans.

=== Health and education initiatives ===
Under British rule, efforts were undertaken to fight the Tsetse fly (a carrier of sleeping sickness), and to fight malaria and bilharziasis; more hospitals were built.

In 1926, the colonial administration provided subsidies to schools run by missionaries, and at the same time established its authority to exercise supervision and to establish guidelines. Yet in 1935, the education budget for the entire country of Tanganyika amounted to only US$290,000, although it is unclear how much this represented at the time in terms of purchasing power parity.

=== Tanganyika wheat scheme ===
The British Government decided to develop wheat growing to help feed a war-ravaged and severely rationed Britain and eventually Europe at the hoped-for Allied victory at the end of the Second World War. An American farmer in Tanganyika, Freddie Smith, was in charge, and David Gordon Hines was the accountant responsible for the finances. The scheme had 50,000 acres (202 km^{2}) on the Ardai plains just outside Arusha; 25,000 acres (101 km^{2}) on Mount Kilimanjaro; and 25,000 acres (101 km^{2}) towards Ngorongoro to the west. All the machinery was lend/lease from the US, including 30 tractors, 30 ploughs, and 30 harrows. There were western agricultural and engineering managers. Most of the workers were Italian prisoners of war from Somalia and Ethiopia: excellent, skilled engineers and mechanics. The Ardai plains were too arid to be successful, but there were good crops in the Kilimanjaro and Ngorongoro areas.

=== World War II ===
In the year preceding the outbreak of World War II, the British considered Tanganyika as a destination for German Jewish refugees.

Two days after Nazi Germany invaded Poland, the United Kingdom declared war and the British forces in Tanganyika were ordered to intern the German males living in Tanganyika. The British government feared that these Axis country citizens would attempt to help the Axis forces and some of the Germans living in Dar es Salaam did attempt to flee the country but were stopped and later interned by Roald Dahl and a small group of Tanganyikan soldiers of the King's African Rifles.

During the war about 100,000 people from Tanganyika joined the Allied forces. and were part of the 375,000 British colonial troops who fought against the Axis forces. Tanganyikans fought in units of the King's African Rifles and fought in the East African Campaign in Somalia and Abyssinia against the Italians, in Madagascar against the Vichy French during the Madagascar Campaign, and in Burma against the Japanese during the Burma Campaign. Tanganyika became an important source of food and Tanganyika's export income greatly increased from the pre-war years of the Great Depression. However, despite the additional income, the war caused inflation within the country.

=== Transition to independence ===
In 1947, Tanganyika became a United Nations trust territory under British control. "Its geography, topography, climate, geopolitics, patterns of settlement and history made Tanganyika the most significant of all UN Trust Territories." But two-thirds of the population lived in one-tenth of the territory because of water shortages, soil erosion, unreliable rainfall, tsetse fly infestations, and poor communications and transportation infrastructures.

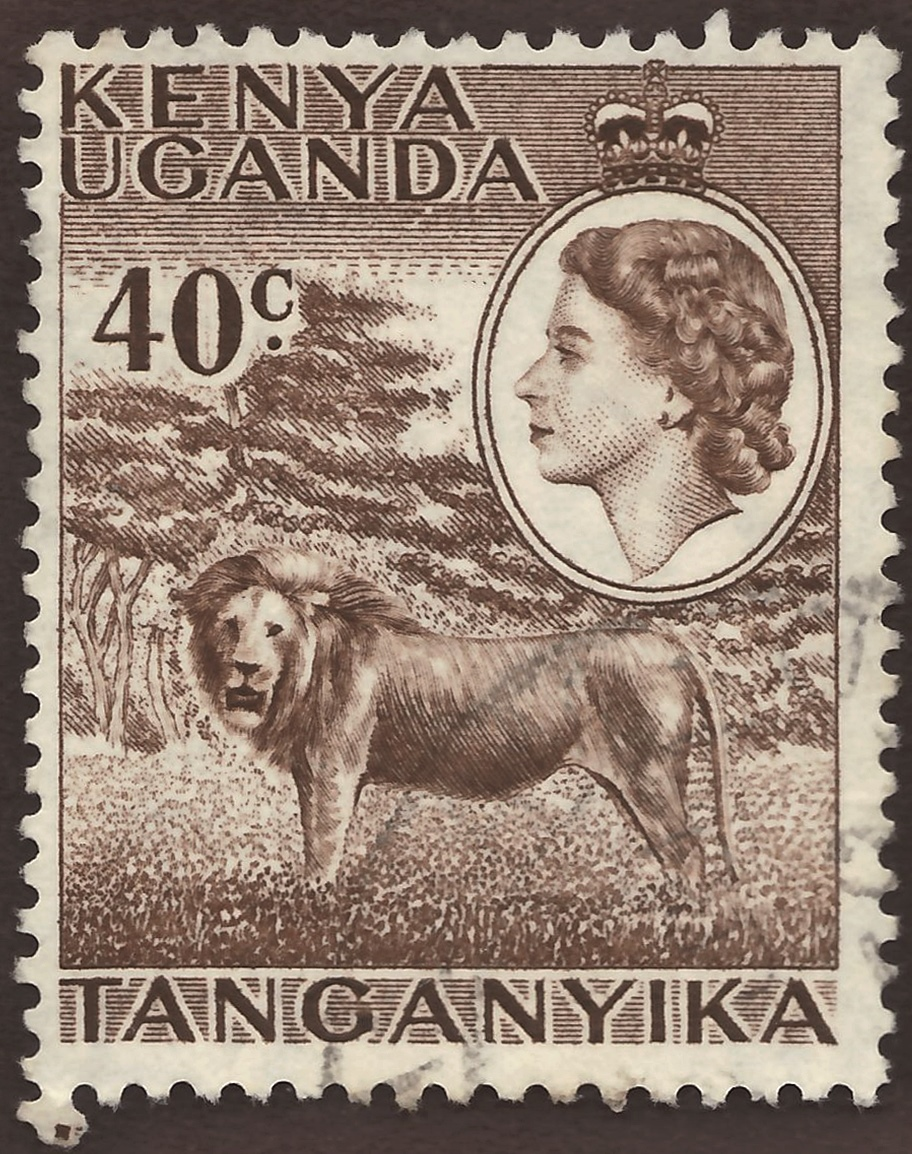
Stamp of British East Africa with portrait of Queen Elizabeth II

==== Multi-ethnic population ====
In 1957, only 15 towns had more than 5,000 inhabitants, with the capital Dar es Salaam having the country's highest population of 128,742. Tanganyika was a multi-racial territory, which made it unique in the trusteeship world. Its total non-African population in 1957 was 123,310 divided as follows: 95,636 Asians and Arabs (subdivided as 65,461 Indians, 6,299 Pakistanis, 4,776 Goans, and 19,100 Arabs), 3,114 Somalis, and 3,782 "coloured" and "other" individuals. The white population, which included the Europeans (British, Italians, Greeks, and Germans) and white South Africans, totalled 20,598 individuals. Tanganyika's ethnic and economic make-up posed problems for the British. Their policy was geared to ensuring the continuance of the European presence as necessary to support the country's economy. But the British also had to remain responsive to the political demands of the Africans.

Many Africans were government servants, business employees, labourers, and producers of important cash crops during this period. But the vast majority were subsistence farmers who produced barely enough to survive. The standards of housing, clothing, and other social conditions were "equally quite poor." The Asians and Arabs were the middle class and tended to be wholesale and retail traders. The white population were missionaries, professional and government servants, and owners and managers of farms, plantations, mines, and other businesses. "White farms were of primary importance as producers of exportable agricultural crops."

==== Co-operative farming started ====
Britain, through its colonial officer David Gordon Hines, encouraged the development of farming co-operatives to help convert subsistence farmers to cash husbandry. The subsistence farmers sold their produce to Indian traders at poor prices. By the early 1950s, there were over 400 co-operatives nationally. Co-operatives formed "unions" for their areas and developed cotton ginneries, coffee factories, and tobacco dryers. A major success for Tanzania was the Moshi coffee auctions that attracted international buyers after the annual Nairobi auctions.

The disastrous Tanganyika groundnut scheme began in 1946 and was abandoned in 1951.

==== UN trust territory ====
After Tanganyika became a UN trust territory, the British felt extra pressure for political progress. The British principle of "gradualism" was increasingly threatened and was abandoned entirely during the last few years before independence. Five UN missions visited Tanganyika, the UN received several hundred written petitions, and a handful of oral presentations made it to the debating chambers in New York City between 1948 and 1960. The UN and the Africans who used the UN to achieve their purposes were very influential in driving Tanganyika towards independence. The Africans attended public gatherings in Tanganyika with UN representatives. There were peasants, urban workers, government employees, and local chiefs and nobles who personally approached the UN about local matters needing immediate action. And finally, there were Africans at the core of the political process who had the power to mould the future. Their goal was political advancement for Africans, with many supporting the nationalist movement, which had its roots in the African Association (AA). It was formed in 1929 as a social organization for African government servants in Dar es Salaam and Zanzibar. The AA was renamed the Tanganyika African Association (TAA) in 1948 and ceased being concerned with events in Zanzibar.

==== African nationalism ====
Beginning in 1954, African nationalism centered on the Tanganyika African National Union (TANU), which was a political organization formed by Julius Nyerere in that year as the successor to the TAA. The TANU won the Legislative Council elections in 1958, 1959, and 1960, with Nyerere becoming chief minister after the 1960 election. Internal self-government started on 1 May 1961 followed by independence on 9 December 1961.

== Zanzibar ==
Location of Zanzibar within Tanzania

Zanzibar today refers to the island of that name, also known as Unguja, and the neighboring island of Pemba. Both islands fell under Portuguese domination in the 16th and early 17th centuries but were retaken by Omani Arabs in the early 18th century. The height of Arab rule came during the reign of Sultan Seyyid Said, who moved his capital from Muscat to Zanzibar, established a ruling Arab elite, and encouraged the development of clove plantations, using the island's slave labor. Zanzibar and Pemba were world-famous for their trade in spices and became known as the Spice Islands; in the early 20th century, they produced approximately 90% of the world's supply of cloves. Zanzibar was also a major transit point in the African Great Lakes and Indian Ocean slave trade. Zanzibar attracted ships from as far away as the United States, which established a consulate in 1833. The United Kingdom's early interest in Zanzibar was motivated by both commerce and the determination to end the Zanzibar slave trade. In 1822, the British signed the first of a series of treaties with Sultan Said to curb this trade, but not until 1876 was the sale of slaves finally prohibited. The Heligoland-Zanzibar Treaty of 1890 made Zanzibar and Pemba a British protectorate, and the Caprivi Strip in Namibia became a German protectorate. British rule through a Sultan remained largely unchanged from the late 19th century until 1957, when elections were held for a largely advisory Legislative Council.

== Independence and Union of Tanganyika and Zanzibar ==
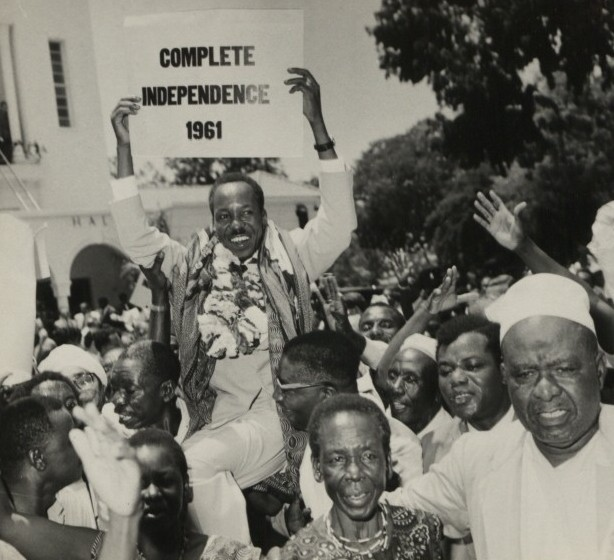
Julius Nyerere demanding political independence for Tanganyika in 1961.

In 1954, Julius Nyerere, a school teacher who was then one of only two Tanganyikans educated to university level, organized a political party—the Tanganyika African National Union (TANU). On 9 December 1961, Tanganyika became independent, though retaining the British monarch as Queen of Tanganyika, and Nyerere became Prime Minister, under a new constitution. On 9 December 1962, a republican constitution was implemented with Mwalimu Julius Kambarage Nyerere as Tanganyika's first president.

Zanzibar received its independence from the United Kingdom on 10 December 1963, as a constitutional monarchy under its Sultan. On 12 January 1964, the African majority revolted against the sultan and a new government was formed with the ASP leader, Abeid Karume, as President of Zanzibar and Chairman of the Revolutionary Council. In the first few days of what would come to be known as the Zanzibar Revolution, between 5,000 and 15,000 Arabs and Indians were murdered. During a series of riots, followers of the radical John Okello carried out thousands of rapes and destroyed homes and other property. Within a few weeks, a fifth of the population had died or fled.

It was at this time that the Tanganyika army revolted and Britain was asked by Julius Nyerere to send in troops. Royal Marines Commandos were sent by air from England via Nairobi and 40 Commando came ashore from the aircraft carrier HMS Bulwark. Several months were spent with Commandos touring the country disarming military outposts. When the successful operation ended, the Royal Marines left to be replaced by Canadian troops.

On 26 April 1964, Tanganyika united with Zanzibar to form the United Republic of Tanganyika and Zanzibar. The country was renamed the United Republic of Tanzania on 29 October of that year. The name Tanzania is a blend of Tanganyika and Zanzibar and previously had no significance. Under the terms of this union, the Zanzibar Government retains considerable local autonomy.

== Recent history ==
To form a sole ruling party in both parts of the union, Julius Nyerere merged TANU with the Zanzibar ruling party, the Afro-Shirazi Party (ASP) of Zanzibar to form the CCM (Chama cha Mapinduzi-CCM Revolutionary Party), on February 5, 1977. The merger was reinforced by principles enunciated in the 1982 union constitution and reaffirmed in the constitution of 1984.

Nyerere believed multiple political parties, in a country with hundreds of ethnic groups, were a threat to national unity and therefore sought ways to ensure a one party system. In a post-colonial and unstable social environment, Nyerere 'well aware of the divisiveness of ethnic chauvinism moved to excise tribalism from national politics'. To further his aim for national unity Nyerere established Kiswahili as the national language.

Nyerere introduced African socialism, or Ujamaa, literal meaning 'family-hood'. Nyerere's government had made Ujamaa the philosophy that would guide Tanzania's national development; 'the government deliberately de-emphasized urban areas to deconcentrate and ruralize industrial growth (Darkoh, 1994). The main urban area of Tanzania, Dar es Salaam, was for several long decades the main victim of this de-emphasis, largely because it 'remained for Nyerere a reminder of a colonial legacy.

Scope of the state expanded rapidly into virtually every sector. In 1967, nationalizations transformed the government into the largest employer in the country. It was involved in everything from retailing to import-export trade and even baking. This created an environment ripe for corruption. Cumbersome bureaucratic procedures multiplied and excessive tax rates set by officials further damaged the economy. Enormous amounts of public funds were misappropriated and put to unproductive use. Purchasing power declined at an unprecedented rate and even essential commodities became unavailable. A system of permits (vibali) allowed officials to collect huge bribes in exchange for the vibali. A foundation for systemic corruption had been laid. Officials became widely known as Wabenzi ("people of the Benz"). By mid-1979, corruption had reached epidemic proportions as the economy collapsed.

Nyerere's Tanzania had a close relationship with the People's Republic of China, the United Kingdom and Germany. In 1979 Tanzania declared war on Uganda after the Soviet-backed Uganda invaded and tried to annex the northern Tanzanian province of Kagera. Tanzania not only expelled Ugandan forces, but, enlisting the country's population of Ugandan exiles, also invaded Uganda itself. On April 11, 1979, the Ugandan president Idi Amin was forced to leave the capital, Kampala, ending the Uganda-Tanzania War. The Tanzanian army took the city with the help of the Ugandan and Rwandan guerrillas. Amin fled into exile.

In October 1985, Nyerere handed over power to Ali Hassan Mwinyi, but retained control of the ruling party, Chama cha Mapinduzi (CCM), as Chairman until 1990, when he handed that responsibility to Mwinyi.

In 1990, a coalition of ethnic and cultural groups of Zanzibar demanded a referendum on independence. They declared that the merger with the mainland Tanzania, based on the now dead ideology of socialism, had transformed Zanzibar from a bustling economic power to a poor, neglected appendage. Their demands were neglected.

However, the ruling party comfortably won the elections amid widespread irregularities and its candidate Benjamin William Mkapa was subsequently sworn in as the new president of Tanzania in the country's ever multi-party election on 23 November 1995. Contested elections in late 2000 led to a massacre in Zanzibar in January 2001, with the government shooting into crowds of protesters, killing 35 and injuring 600. In December 2005, Jakaya Mrisho Kikwete was elected the fourth president for a five-year term.

One of the deadly 1998 U.S. embassy bombings occurred in Dar Es Salaam; the other was in Nairobi, Kenya. In 2004, the undersea earthquake on the other side of the Indian Ocean caused tsunamis along Tanzania's coastline in which 11 people were killed. An oil tanker also temporarily ran aground in the Dar Es Salaam harbour, damaging an oil pipeline.

In 2008, a power surge cut off power to Zanzibar, resulting in the 2008 Zanzibar Power blackout.

In 2015, after the ten-year term of president Jakaya Kikwete, the presidential election was won by John Magufuli. In October 2020, president Magufoli was re-elected in an election contested by the opposition.

The Chama cha Mapinduzi (CCM) party has held power since independence in 1961. It is the longest-serving ruling party in Africa. Every president of Tanzania has represented the party. According to Human Rights Watch, since the election of Magufuli in December 2015 Tanzania has witnessed a marked decline in respect for free expression, association and assembly.

On 19 March 2021, Vice President Samia Suluhu Hassan became the new president after the sudden death of Magufuli. She is the first female president of Tanzania.

== Recent archaeological discoveries ==
In February 2021, Polish archaeologists from Jagiellonian University announced the discovery of ancient rock art with anthropomorphic figures in a good condition at the Amak’hee 4 rockshelter site in Swaga Swaga Game Reserve in Tanzania.

The paintings found at the rock shelter were made with a reddish dye and included buffalo heads, a giraffe head and neck, and domesticated cattle. They have been dated back to approximately several hundred years ago. Archaeologists estimated that these paintings may describe a ritual of the Sandawe people, although their present religion does not contain elements of anthropomorphization of buffaloes.

== See also ==
- History of Africa
- History of Zanzibar
- HIV/AIDS in Tanzania
- List of colonial heads of Tanganyika
- List of governors-general of Tanganyika
- List of human evolution fossils
- List of presidents of Tanganyika
- List of presidents of Tanzania
- List of presidents of Zanzibar
- List of prime ministers of Tanganyika
- List of prime ministers of Tanzania
- List of heads of government of Zanzibar
- List of sultans of Zanzibar
- Politics of Tanzania
- Tanganyika
- Timeline of Tanzanian history
- History of cities in Tanzania:
  - Dar es Salaam history and timeline
  - Zanzibar City history and timeline
