= Tanganyika (1961–1964) =

Country in East Africa from 1961 to 1964

Tanganyika (1961–1962) Republic of Tanganyika (1962–1964) Jamhuri ya Tanganyika (Swahili)
- 1961–1964
- Flag Coat of arms
- Anthem: Mungu ibariki Afrika ("God bless Africa")
- Capital: Dar es Salaam
- Common languages: Swahili; English
- Demonym: Tanganyikan
- Government: Parliamentary constitutional monarchy (1961–1962) Presidential republic (1962–1964)
- Head of State
  - 1961–1962: Elizabeth II (Monarch)
  - 1962–1964: Julius Nyerere (President)
- Governor-General
  - 1961–1962: Sir Richard Turnbull
- Prime Minister
  - 1961–1962: Julius Nyerere (first)
  - 1962: Rashidi Kawawa (Last)
- History
  - Independence from British Empire: 9 December 1961
  - Republic: 9 December 1962
  - Union with Zanzibar: 26 April 1964

Area
  - Total: 944,842 km^{2} (364,806 sq mi)
- Currency: East African shilling
Preceded by	Succeeded by
Tanganyika	United Republic of Tanganyika and Zanzibar
- Today part of: Tanzania

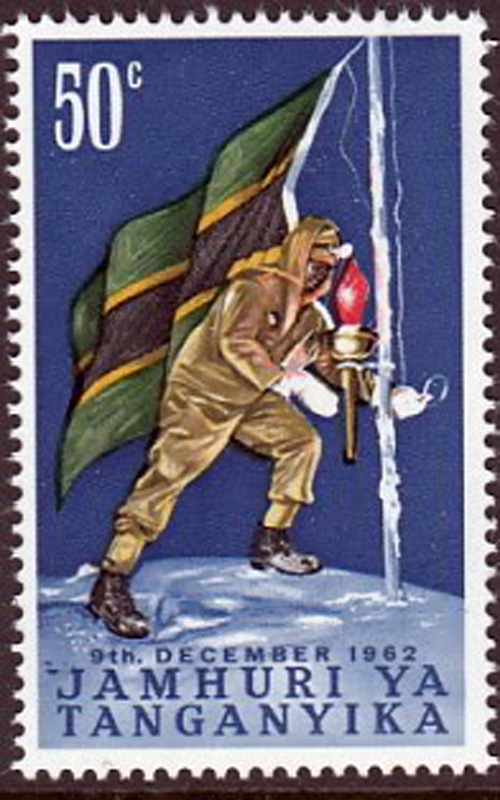
1962 Tanganyika stamp depicting mountaineer Alex Nyirenda atop Uhuru Peak with Tanganyika flag

Tanganyika (/ˌtæŋɡənˈjiːkə/ TANG-gən-YEE-kə; Swahili: [tɑᵑɡɑˈɲikɑ]) was a sovereign state, comprising the mainland part of present-day Tanzania, that existed from 1961 until 1964. It first gained independence from the United Kingdom on 9 December 1961 as a Commonwealth realm headed by Queen Elizabeth II before becoming a republic within the Commonwealth of Nations as the Republic of Tanganyika a year later. After signing the Articles of Union on 22 April 1964 and passing an Act of Union on 25 April, Tanganyika officially joined with the People's Republic of Zanzibar to form the United Republic of Tanganyika and Zanzibar on Union Day, 26 April 1964. The new state changed its name to the United Republic of Tanzania within a year.

== History ==
Tanganyika originally consisted of the Tanganyika Territory—the British share of German East Africa—which the British took under a League of Nations mandate in 1922, and which was later transformed into a United Nations Trust Territory after the Second World War. The next largest share of German East Africa was taken into Belgian trusteeship as Ruanda-Urundi, eventually becoming present-day Burundi and Rwanda.

Tanganyika Independence Act 1961 (Note: Section 5(1).)
- Act of Parliament
- Parliament of the United Kingdom
- Long title: An Act to make provision for, and in connection with, the attainment by Tanganyika of fully responsible status within the Commonwealth.
- Citation: 10 & 11 Eliz. 2. c. 1
- Territorial extent: United Kingdom

Dates
- Royal assent: 22 November 1961
- Commencement: 22 November 1961 (Note: The Acts of Parliament (Commencement) Act 1793.)
Other legislation
Amended by	Emergency Laws (Re-enactments and Repeals) 1964; Tanzania Act 1969; Finance Act 1969; Statute Law (Repeals) Act 1969; Civil Aviation Act 1971; Statute Law (Repeals) Act 1976; Statute Law (Repeals) Act 1977; Interpretation Act 1978; International Organisations Act 1981; British Nationality Act 1981; Family Law Act 1986; Copyright, Designs and Patents Act 1988; Merchant Shipping Act 1995; Commonwealth Act 2002; Armed Forces Act 2006

Status: Amended

Text of statute as originally enacted

Text of the Tanganyika Independence Act 1961 as in force today (including any amendments) within the United Kingdom, from legislation.gov.uk.

The Tanganyika Independence Act 1961 (10 & 11 Eliz. 2. c. 1) transformed the United Nations trust territory into the independent sovereign state of Tanganyika, with Elizabeth II as Queen of Tanganyika. The monarch's constitutional roles were mostly exercised by the Governor-General of Tanganyika.

Tanganyika adopted a new constitution in 1962 that abolished the monarchy, and the National Assembly (the majority of whom were members of the Tanganyika African National Union Party) thoroughly revised the new constitution to favour a strong executive branch of government, namely a president. Tanganyika then became a republic within the Commonwealth of Nations, with Julius Nyerere as the President of Tanganyika. After the Union of Zanzibar and Tanganyika, an interim constitution adapted from the 1962 Constitution became the governing document. Although meant to be temporary, the constitutions remained effective until 1977.

The unification of Tanganyika and Zanzibar in 1964 followed Nyerere's principle of Ujamaa which entailed a strong "territorial nationalism."

== See also ==
- Postage stamps and postal history of Tanganyika
- Tanganyika laughter epidemic
