= Mainland Tanzania =

Overview of the mainland region of Tanzania

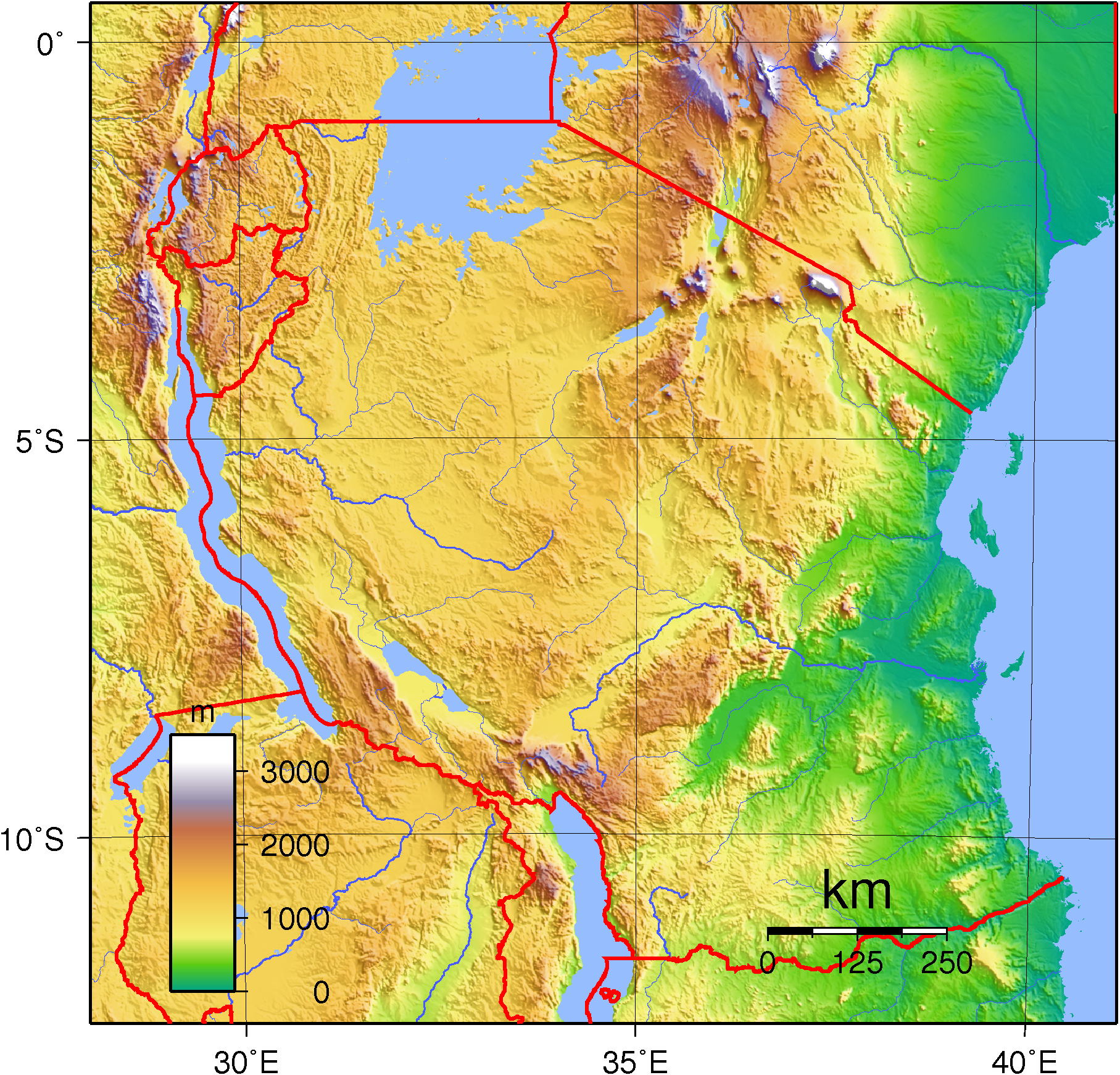
Topographic map of Tanzania

Mainland Tanzania refers to the part of Tanzania located on the continental mainland of Africa and the Mafia Archipelago; excluding the islands of Zanzibar. It corresponds with the area of the former country of Tanganyika.

26 of Tanzania's 31 regions are located on the mainland.

== Geography ==
Northeast Tanzania exhibits a mountainous terrain and includes Mount Meru, an active volcano, Mount Kilimanjaro, a dormant volcano, and the Usambara and Pare mountain ranges. Kilimanjaro attracts thousands of tourists each year. West of those mountains is the Gregory Rift, which is the eastern arm of the Great Rift Valley. On the floor of the rift are a number of large salt lakes, including Natron in the north, Manyara in the south, and Eyasi in the southwest. The rift also encompasses the Crater Highlands, which includes the Ngorongoro Conservation Area and the Ngorongoro Crater. Just to the south of Lake Natron is Ol Doinyo Lengai with an elevation of 3,188 m (10,459 ft), the world's only active volcano to produce natrocarbonatite lava. To the west of the Crater Highlands lies Serengeti National Park, which is famous for its lions, leopards, elephants, rhinoceroses, and buffalo plus the annual migration of millions of white bearded wildebeest. Just to the southeast of the park is Olduvai Gorge, where many of the oldest hominid fossils and artifacts have been found.

Further northwest is Lake Victoria on the Kenya–Uganda–Tanzania border. This is the largest lake in Africa by surface area and is traditionally named as the source of the Nile River. Southwest of this, separating Tanzania from the Democratic Republic of the Congo, is Lake Tanganyika. This lake is estimated to be the second deepest lake in the world after Lake Baikal in Siberia. The western portion of the country between Lakes Victoria, Tanganyika, and Malawi consists of flat land that has been categorised by the World Wildlife Fund as part of the Central Zambezian miombo woodlands ecoregion. Just upstream from the Kalambo Falls, there is one of the most important archaeological sites in Africa. Tanzania's Southern Highlands are in the southwestern part of the country, around the northern end of Lake Malawi. Mbeya is the largest city in the Southern Highlands.

The centre of Tanzania is a large plateau, which is part of the East African Plateau. The southern half of this plateau is grassland within the Eastern miombo woodlands ecoregion, the majority of which is covered by the huge Selous National Park. Further north the plateau is arable land and includes the national capital, Dodoma.

The eastern coast contains Tanzania's largest city and former capital, Dar es Salaam. Just north of this city lies the Zanzibar Archipelago, a semi-autonomous territory of Tanzania which is famous for its spices. The coast is home to areas of East African mangroves, mangrove swamps that are an important habitat for wildlife on land and in the water.

== History ==
=== Tanganyika ===
Tanganyika as a geographical and political entity did not take shape before the period of High Imperialism; its name only came into use after German East Africa was transferred to the United Kingdom as a mandate by the League of Nations in 1920. What is referred to here, therefore, is the history of the region that was to become Tanzania. A part of the Great Lakes region, namely the western shore of Lake Victoria consisted of many small kingdoms, most notably Buzinza and Karagwe, which were dominated by their more powerful neighbours Buganda, Burundi, and Rwanda.

European exploration of the interior began in the mid-19th century. In 1848 the German missionary Johannes Rebmann became the first European to see Mount Kilimanjaro. British explorers Richard Burton and John Speke crossed the interior to Lake Tanganyika in June 1857. In January 1866, the Scottish explorer and missionary David Livingstone, who crusaded against the slave trade, went to Zanzibar, from where he sought the source of the Nile, and established his last mission at Ujiji on the shores of Lake Tanganyika. After having lost contact with the outside world for years, he was "found" there on 10 November 1871. Henry Morton Stanley, who had been sent in a publicity stunt to find him by the New York Herald newspaper, greeted him with the now famous words "Dr Livingstone, I presume?" In 1877, the first of a series of Belgian expeditions arrived on Zanzibar. In the course of these expeditions, in 1879 a station was founded in Kigoma on the eastern bank of Lake Tanganyika, soon to be followed by the station of Mpala on the opposite western bank. Both stations were founded in the name of the Comite D'Etudes Du Haut Congo, a predecessor organization of the Congo Free State. German colonial interests were first advanced in 1884. Karl Peters, who formed the Society for German Colonization, concluded a series of treaties by which tribal chiefs ceded territory to the society. Prince Otto von Bismarck's government in 1885 granted imperial protection to the German East Africa Company established by Peters with Bismark's encouragement.

At the Berlin Conference of 1885, the fact that Kigoma had been established and supplied from Zanzibar and Bagamoyo led to the inclusion of German East Africa into the territory of the Conventional Basin of the Congo, to Belgium's advantage. At the table in Berlin, contrary to widespread perception, Africa was not partitioned; rather, rules were established among the colonial powers and prospective colonial powers as how to proceed in the establishment of colonies and protectorates. While the Belgian interest soon concentrated on the Congo River, the British and Germans focused on Eastern Africa and in 1886 partitioned continental East Africa between themselves; the Sultanate of Zanzibar, now reduced to the islands of Zanzibar and Pemba, remained independent, for the moment. The Congo Free State was eventually to give up its claim on Kigoma (its oldest station in Central Africa) and on any territory to the east of Lake Tanganyika, to Germany.

=== World War I ===
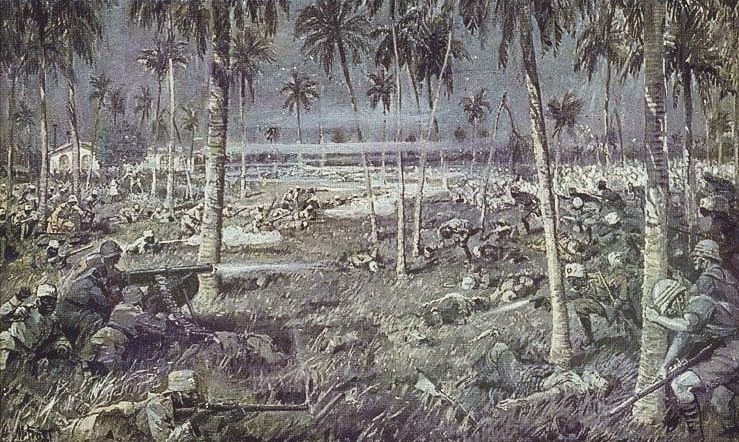
Battle of Tanga, fought between the British and Germans during World War I

Germany commenced hostilities in 1914 by unsuccessfully attacking from the town of Tanga. The British then attacked the town in November 1914 but were thwarted by General Paul von Lettow-Vorbeck's forces at the Battle of Tanga. The British Royal Navy occupied Mafia Island in January 1915. However, the "attack on Tanga and the numerous smaller engagements that followed [showed] the strength ... of [German forces] and made it evident that a powerful force must be organized before the conquest of [German East Africa] could be ... undertaken. Such an enterprise had ... to await more favourable conditions on European battlefields and elsewhere. But in July, 1915, the last German troops in S.W. Africa capitulated ... and the nucleus of the requisite force ... became available." British forces from the northeast and southwest and Belgian forces from the northwest steadily attacked and defeated German forces beginning in January 1916. In October 1916, General Smuts wrote, "With the exception of the Mahenge Plateau [the Germans] have lost every healthy or valuable part of their Colony".

Cut-off from Germany, General Von Lettow by necessity conducted a guerilla campaign throughout 1917, living off the land and dispersing over a wide area. In December, the remaining German forces evacuated the colony by crossing the Ruvuma River into Portuguese Mozambique. Those forces were estimated at 320 German troops and 2,500 Askaris. 1,618 Germans and 5,482 Askaris were killed or captured during the last six months of 1917. In November 1918, his remaining force surrendered near present-day Mbala, Zambia consisting of 155 Europeans, 1,165 Askaris, 2,294 African porters etc., and 819 African women.

Under the Treaty of Versailles, Germany relinquished all her overseas possessions, including German East Africa. Britain lost 3,443 men in battle plus 6,558 men to disease. The equivalent numbers for Belgium were 683 and 1,300. Germany lost 734 Europeans and 1,798 Africans.

=== British rule ===
The first British civilian administrator after the end of World War I was Sir Horace Archer Byatt CMG, appointed by Royal Commission on 31 January 1919. The colony was renamed Tanganyika Territory in January 1920. In September 1920 by the Tanganyika Order in Council, 1920, the initial boundaries of the territory, the Executive Council, and the offices of governor and commander-in-chief were established. The governor legislated by proclamation or ordinance until 1926.

Britain and Belgium signed an agreement regarding the border between Tanganyika and Ruanda-Urundi in 1924.

Governor Byatt took measures to revive African institutions by encouraging limited local rule. He authorized the formation in 1922 of political clubs such as the Tanganyika Territory African Civil Service Association, which in 1929 became the Tanganyika African Association and later constituted the core of the nationalist movement. Under the Native Authority Ordinances of 1923, limited powers were granted to certain recognized chiefs who could also exercise powers granted by local customary law.

Sir Donald Cameron became the governor of Tanganyika in 1925. "His work ... was of great significance in the development of colonial administrative policy, being associated especially with the vigorous attempt to establish a system of 'Indirect Rule' through the traditional indigenous authorities." He was a major critic of Governor Byatt's policies about indirect rule, as evidenced by his Native Administration Memorandum No. 1, Principles of Native Administration and their Application.

In 1926, the Legislative Council was established with seven unofficial (including two Indians) and thirteen official members, whose function was to advise and consent to ordinances issued by the governor. In 1945, the first Africans were appointed to the council. The council was reconstituted in 1948 under Governor Edward Twining, with 15 unofficial members (7 Europeans, 4 Africans, and 4 Indians) and 14 official members. Julius Nyerere became one of the unofficial members in 1954. The council was again reconstituted in 1955 with 44 unofficial members (10 Europeans, 10 Africans, 10 Indians, and 14 government representatives) and 17 official members.

Governor Cameron in 1929 enacted the Native Courts Ordinance No. 5, which removed those courts from the jurisdiction of the colonial courts and provided for a system of appeals with final resort to the governor himself.

=== Independence ===
In 1954, Julius Nyerere, a school teacher who was then one of only two Tanganyikans educated to university level, organized a political party—the Tanganyika African National Union (TANU). On 9 December 1961, Tanganyika became independent, though retaining the British monarch as Queen of Tanganyika, and Nyerere became Prime Minister, under a new constitution. On 9 December 1962, a republican constitution was implemented with Mwalimu Julius Kambarage Nyerere as Tanganyika's first president.

On 26 April 1964, Tanganyika united with Zanzibar to form the United Republic of Tanganyika and Zanzibar. The country was renamed the United Republic of Tanzania on 29 October of that year. The name Tanzania is a blend of Tanganyika and Zanzibar and previously had no significance. Under the terms of this union, the Zanzibar Government retains considerable local autonomy.

== Population ==
In 1919, the population was estimated at 3,500,000.

In 1931 a census established the population of Tanganyika at 5,022,640 natives, in addition to 32,398 Asians and 8,228 Europeans.

In 1957, only 15 towns had over 5,000 inhabitants, with the capital Dar es Salaam having the nation's highest population of 128,742. Tanganyika was a multi-racial territory, which made it unique in the trusteeship world. Its total non-African population in 1957 was 123,310 divided as follows: 95,636 Asians and Arabs (subdivided as 65,461 Indians, 6,299 Pakistanis, 4,776 Goans, and 19,100 Arabs), 3,114 Somalis, and 3,782 "coloured" and "other" individuals. The white population, which included the Europeans (British, Italians, Greeks, and Germans) and white South Africans, totalled 20,598 individuals. Tanganyika's ethnic and economic make-up posed problems for the British. Their policy was geared to ensuring the continuance of the European presence as necessary to support the country's economy. But the British also had to remain responsive to the political demands of the Africans.

Many Africans were government servants, business employees, labourers, and producers of important cash crops during this period. But the vast majority were subsistence farmers who produced barely enough to survive. The standards of housing, clothing, and other social conditions were "equally quite poor." The Asians and Arabs were the middle class and tended to be wholesale and retail traders. The white population were missionaries, professional and government servants, and owners and managers of farms, plantations, mines, and other businesses. "White farms were of primary importance as producers of exportable agricultural crops."

== Agriculture ==
Britain, through its colonial officer David Gordon Hines, encouraged the development of farming co-operatives to help convert subsistence farmers to cash husbandry. The subsistence farmers sold their produce to Indian traders at poor prices. By the early 1950s, there were over 400 co-operatives nationally. Co-operatives formed "unions" for their areas and developed cotton ginneries, coffee factories, and tobacco dryers. A major success for Tanzania was the Moshi coffee auctions that attracted international buyers after the annual Nairobi auctions.

The disastrous Tanganyika groundnut scheme began in 1946 and was abandoned in 1951.

== See also ==
- Zanzibar Archipelago
