= Richard Turnbull (colonial administrator) =

British colonial governor (1909-1998)

Sir Richard Turnbull

Governor of Tanganyika
- In office 15 July 1958 – 9 December 1961
- Monarch: Elizabeth II
- Preceded by: Edward Twining
- Succeeded by: himself (as Governor-General)

Governor-General of Tanganyika
- In office 9 December 1961 – 9 December 1962
- Monarch: Elizabeth II
- Prime Minister: Julius Nyerere; Rashidi Kawawa
- Preceded by: Office established himself (as Governor)
- Succeeded by: Office abolished

2nd High Commissioner of South Arabia
- In office 1964–1967
- Monarch: Elizabeth II
- Preceded by: Sir Kennedy Trevaskis
- Succeeded by: Sir Humphrey Trevelyan

Personal details
- Born: 7 July 1909 St Albans, Hertfordshire, England
- Died: 21 December 1998 (aged 89) Cirencester, Gloucestershire, England

Sir Richard Gordon Turnbull, GCMG (7 July 1909 – 21 December 1998) was a British colonial governor and the last governor of the British mandate of Tanganyika from 1958 to 1961. Following the country's independence, he was governor-general from 9 December 1961 to 9 December 1962.

== Biography ==
Richard Gordon Turnbull was born in St Albans, Hertfordshire, and educated at University College School in Hampstead, University College London and Magdalene College, Cambridge. In 1931, he entered the Colonial Administrative Service in Kenya as a cadet, before working for nearly two decades as a district officer. He was then a provincial commander before becoming Minister for Internal Security and Defence in 1954. A year later, he was appointed chief secretary of Kenya, assuming his role during the midst of the Mau Mau rebellion. In 1958, he succeeded Edward Twining as governor of Tanganyika. Following the first elections to the Legislative Council, Turnbull appointed five members of Julius Nyerere's Tanganyika African National Union party. At the end of 1961, Tanganyika became independent with Nyerere as prime minister and Turnbull as governor-general. He served for a year until Tanganyika became a republic in December 1962. He later became the penultimate High Commissioner of Aden in 1965.

Government offices
Preceded by Edward Twining	Governors of Tanganyika; 1958–1961	Succeeded by Position abolished
Preceded by Kennedy Trevaskis	High Commissioner of Aden; 1965–1967	Succeeded by Humphrey Trevelyan
