= Articles of Union =

1964 constitutional document of Tanzania

The Articles of Union of Tanganyika and Zanzibar of 1964 is the main foundation of the Constitutions of the United Republic of Tanzania of 1977 and the Zanzibar Revolutionary Government of 1984. The Articles of the Union were signed on 22 April 1964, by the founders of the Union, Julius Nyerere and Abeid Amani Karume and agreed in 11 matters which later increased to over 22 and are the source of tension and dispute between mainland Tanzania mainland and Zanzibar. The original Articles of Union which contain both signatures from Nyerere and Karume are yet to be found.

== Background history ==
The United Republic of Tanzania was formed on 26 April 1964 as a result of the union of Tanganyika and Zanzibar. Julius Nyerere became the first president and Sheikh Abeid Karume became the first vice president and chairman of the Revolutionary Council. Rashidi Mfaume Kawawa later became the second vice president of Tanzania and leader of government business in the National Assembly.

Similar to other African nations at the time, Tanganyika had been opposing colonial invaders for decades. Included in this effort were the African Associations of Tanganyika and Zanzibar, the former of which was established in 1929 and expanded greatly by 1948. In 1953, under the leadership of Nyerere, the TAA was formally recognised as a political party, transforming into the Tanganyika African National Union (TANU) by 1954.

In Zanzibar, the various football clubs established in the early 1930s provided the basis for the creation of unity in the African community. By 1934, members of the African community had united in a formal organisation known as the African Association (AA). The formation of the Zanzibar Nationalist Party (ZNP) in 1955 forced leaders of the African Association and the Shirazi Association to unite to form the Afro-Shirazi Party under the leadership of Sheikh Abeid Amani Karume.

== Signing of the Agreements ==
It is believed that the agreement for the unification of the two states was signed by the first president of Tanganyika, Mwalimu Julius Kambarage Nyerere, and the first president of Zanzibar, Sheikh Abeid Amani Karume, on 22 April 1964, in Zanzibar. Although the original Articles of the Union does not exist, it was agreed that, to become valid The Articles of the Union must be ratified by both Tanganyika's parliament and Zanzibar revolutionary council. The Articles was ratified by Tanganyika's Parliament on 26 April 1964 but was not ratified by the Zanzibar Revolutionary Council as per agreement. On 27 April 1964, the leaders of the two countries exchanged legal documents of the Union at the Karimjee Hall in Dar es Salaam. The Articles of the Union declared the formation of the United Republic in Section 4.

== Critics and grievances ==
Since its formation in 1964 under the Tanzania first president, Mwalimu Julius Nyerere, any discussion or debate concerning the union and its legality was never allowed in Tanzania and could lead to criminal charges to anyone who conducts such discussion or debate, including government officials, such person could be seen as an enemy of the nation.

Knowledge and education about the union was never conducted and Tanzania citizen had no knowledge about the Union, its benefits and the reason for the union. The original Articles of Union which contain 11 matter was never existed and often Zanzibar Government asked about it only to receive negative results. In private and public funded education, the Union topic or history was never included, even in general studies and civic studies. The only place where union matter appears is in the exams in the form of "When was the union formed?" This led to a number of critics and grievances since the Nyerere's era. Second president of Zanzibar, Aboud Jumbe, was among the first public figure to fall on the trap. In 1984, Jumbe and his colleagues, including his chief minister Seif Sharif Hamad, attempted to push for more autonomy for Zanzibar. As a result, Aboud Jumbe was pressured by the union government to resign his posts as vice president of Tanzania and president of Zanzibar in January 1984. His chief minister, Seif Sharif Hamad, was detained, and in January 1988 dropped from the Revolutionary Council and dropped as the chief minister of Zanzibar. In May 1988, he was expelled from the ruling CCM with six colleagues and automatically lost his parliamentary seat in the Zanzibar House of Representatives. In May 1989, he was arrested and taken to court to face charges of allegedly being found with government secret documents believed to be the Article of Union. From 1989 to 1991 he was reprimanded in the Zanzibar Central Prison.

Among the critics including, between 1964 and 1973 in six other things - elements seen in 12 to 16 of the First Additional - were added to the list of Union Matters. Thus, in 1965 the issues of finance, currency and banking were added, in 1967 the manufacturing licences and statistics, higher education and what was in Annex X of the Charter of the East African Community was expanded, in 1968 was expanded to the natural resources of oil, petroleum and natural gas, and in 1973 issues of the National Examinations Council was expanded. 1984 addition of elements of Annex X of the Charter of the East African Community to create four independent list, transportation and aviation, research, weather forecast and data. Similarly, changes of constitution had raised new thing on the list of the Union Matters: Court of Appeal of Tanzania. In addition, section 3 (Defense) was amended to become 'safety and security'. In 1992, 'the registration of political parties' was added to the list of Union Matters. Also the issue of removing power to Zanzibar president to seize being the vice president of Tanzania created a fierce debate. In addition, the Interim Constitution, 1965 that dominant in Tanzania until 1977 passed the law of Annex II of the Constitution to make provision that the Act can not be adjusted without amendment supported by two-thirds of all members of Tanganyika and Zanzibar. Similarly, the Constitution specifies, in the First Additional, that any one of the legal changes requires support from two-thirds of all members in "Chapter 557 (Edition 1965), Laws of the Union Treaty Verification of Tanganyika and Zanzibar" in 1964, but unfortunately all addition Matters of the union did not follow the law and were inserted locally.

== Complaints from Zanzibar ==
Complaints from Zanzibar started before the assassination of Zanzibar first president, Sheikh Abeid Amani Karume Snr. According to one of the first President of Zanzibar Revolution Council, Nassor Hassan Moyo, who was also a minister for many years in Tanzania, the decision to unite Tanganyika and Zanzibar was Nyerere opinion. Among the first thing Nyerere suggested to Karume snr. was to unite the two countries and then came the articles of Union later on the creation of the Union constitution.

In the 1970s Nyerere decision to send soldiers from Zanzibar to fight liberation of Mozambique without Karume's knowledge was among the first clashes between Zanzibar and Tanganyika. Karume decision to return the soldier caused Nyerere and Karume not to speak face to face from that day to the death of Karume. After three days, the Zanzibar revolutionary council met to decide the fate of the Union and prepared special request letter which contained five or six matters which was sent to Nyerere to change the list of the articles of Union, the list including Tanzania president should seek advice to Zanzibar president in any decision including Announcement of State of emergency, police to be excluded in Union Matters, international relation should be equal and each country should have its own currency. Nyerere turned down the request and offer to postpone the discussion until future.

== See also ==
- Uamsho movement
