= 1985 Tanzanian general election =

| ← 1980 | 27 October 1985 | 1990 → |
- Presidential election
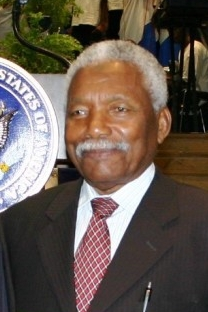
| Nominee | Ali Hassan Mwinyi |
| Party | CCM |
| Popular vote | 4,778,114 |
| Percentage | 95.68% |
President before election
Julius Nyerere
CCM
Elected President
Ali Hassan Mwinyi
CCM

General elections were held in Tanzania on 27 October 1985. The country was a one-party state at the time, with the Chama Cha Mapinduzi as the sole legal party. For the National Assembly election there were two candidates from the same party in each constituency, whilst the presidential election was effectively a referendum on CCM's candidate Ali Hassan Mwinyi, who succeeded Julius Nyerere as president.

Several changes were made to the elections, including increasing the number of constituencies from 106 to 119, scrapping the 20 regional seats elected by MPs, and the introduction of 15 reserved seats for women. The voting age was reduced from 21 to 18 by the 1985 Elections Act, and a constitutional amendment the previous year had limited the president to two terms.

Voter turnout was 74% in the National Assembly election and 75% in the presidential election.

== Results ==
=== President ===
| Candidate | Party | Votes | % |
|---|---|---|---|
| Ali Hassan Mwinyi | Chama Cha Mapinduzi | 4,778,114 | 95.68 |
| Against | | 215,626 | 4.32 |
| Total | | 4,993,740 | 100.00 |
| Valid votes | | 4,993,740 | 96.37 |
| Invalid/blank votes | | 188,259 | 3.63 |
| Total votes | | 5,181,999 | 100.00 |
| Registered voters/turnout | | 6,910,555 | 74.99 |
Source: Nohlen et al.

=== National Assembly ===
| Party | Votes | % | Seats |
|---|---|---|---|
| Chama Cha Mapinduzi | 4,768,997 | 100.00 | 169 |
| Appointed and indirectly-elected members | | | 105 |
| Total | 4,768,997 | 100.00 | 274 |
| Valid votes | 4,768,997 | 95.70 | |
| Invalid/blank votes | 214,324 | 4.30 | |
| Total votes | 4,983,321 | 100.00 | |
| Registered voters/turnout | 6,736,863 | 73.97 | |
Source: IPU, Nohlen et al.
