= 1980 Tanzanian general election =

← 1975	26 October 1980	1985 →
- Presidential election
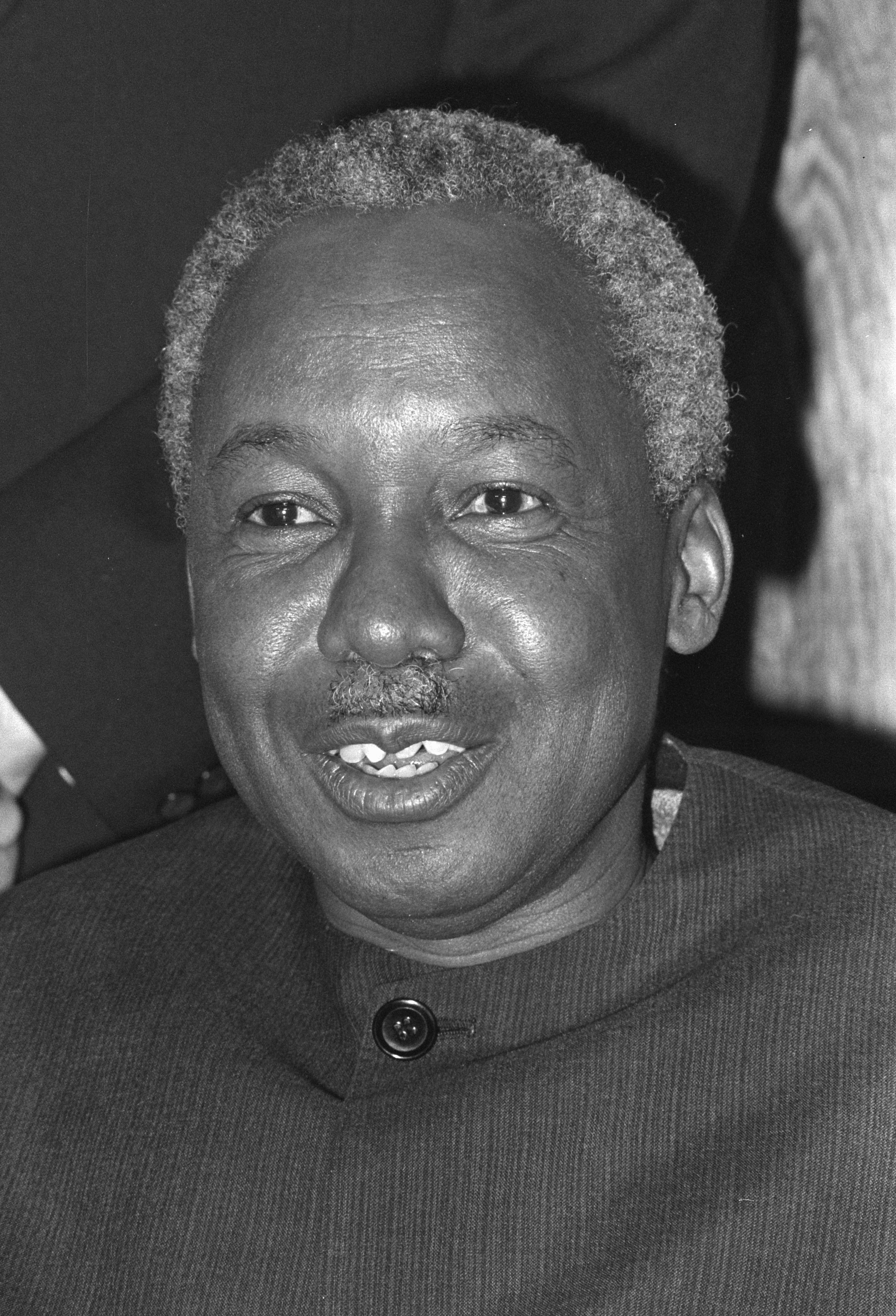
Nominee	Julius Nyerere
Party	CCM
Popular vote	5,570,883
Percentage	95.56%
President before election
Julius Nyerere
CCM
Elected President
Julius Nyerere
CCM

General elections were held in Tanzania on 26 October 1980. The country was a one-party state at the time, with the Chama Cha Mapinduzi as the sole legal party, following the 1977 merger of the mainland-based Tanganyika African National Union and the Zanzibar-based Afro-Shirazi Party, which had previously operated as the sole legal parties in their areas. For the National Assembly election there were two candidates from the same party in each of the 106 constituencies, whilst the presidential election was effectively a referendum on CCM leader Julius Nyerere's candidacy.

Voter turnout was 86% of the 6,969,803 registered voters in the presidential election and 85% for the National Assembly, although the country's population was around 18 million at the time of the election.

== Results ==
=== President ===
Candidate	Party	Votes	%
Julius Nyerere	Chama Cha Mapinduzi	5,570,883	95.56
Against		259,040	4.44
Total		5,829,923	100.00
Valid votes		5,829,923	97.38
Invalid/blank votes		157,019	2.62
Total votes		5,986,942	100.00
Registered voters/turnout		6,969,803	85.90
Source: Nohlen et al.

=== National Assembly ===
Party	Votes	%	Seats
Chama Cha Mapinduzi	5,417,099	100.00	111
Appointed and indirectly-elected members			153
Total	5,417,099	100.00	264
Valid votes	5,417,099	96.83	
Invalid/blank votes	177,243	3.17	
Total votes	5,594,342	100.00	
Registered voters/turnout	6,604,408	84.71	
Source: IPU, Nohlen et al.
