= 1970 Tanzanian general election =

← 1965	30 October 1970	1975 →
- Presidential election
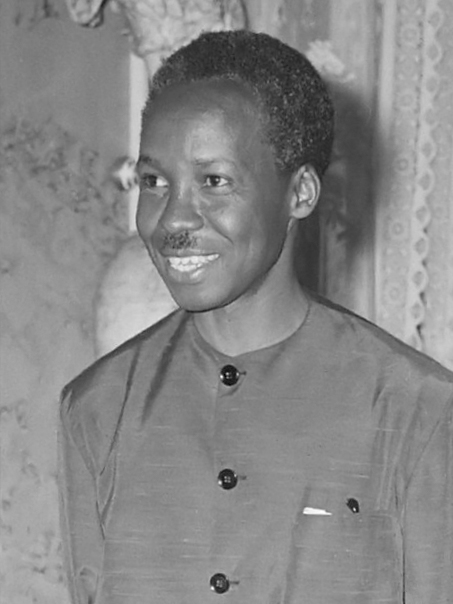
Nominee	Julius Nyerere
Party	TANU
Popular vote	3,220,636
Percentage	96.73%
President before election
Julius Nyerere
TANU
Elected President
Julius Nyerere
TANU

General elections were held in Tanzania on 30 October 1970. The country was a one-party state at the time, with the Tanganyika African National Union as the sole legal party on the mainland, and the Afro-Shirazi Party was the only party in Zanzibar. For the National Assembly election there were two candidates from the same party in each of the 106 constituencies, whilst the presidential election was effectively a referendum on TANU leader Julius Nyerere's candidacy.

Voter turnout was 70% in the presidential election and 67% in the National Assembly election.

Nyerere took the presidential oath on 5 November 1970. At the same time he announced members of the new government led by Prime Minister Amani Karume, deputy Prime Minister and Defense Minister Rashid Mfaume Kawama, second deputy and Foreign Affairs Minister Isael Melinawingha, finances Amir Habib Jamal, trade and industry Paul Bomani, communication, transport and employment Job Malecela Luisinde, education Chadiel Johann Mgonji, economy and development Abdul Rahman Mohamed Babu, accommodation and rural and urban development John Mhavile, information and radio Jacob Namfu, water and energy PhD Wilbert Chaguli. Ali Hassan Mweny was appointed as the State Minister at the President's Office.

== Results ==
=== President ===
Candidate	Party	Votes	%
Julius Nyerere	Tanganyika African National Union	3,220,636	96.73
Against		108,956	3.27
Total		3,329,592	100.00
Valid votes		3,329,592	97.73
Invalid/blank votes		77,491	2.27
Total votes		3,407,083	100.00
Registered voters/turnout		4,860,456	70.10
Source: Nohlen et al.

=== National Assembly ===
Party	Votes	%	Seats
Tanganyika African National Union			120
Appointed and indirectly-elected members			75
Total			195
Total votes	3,237,255	–	
Registered voters/turnout	4,860,456	66.60	
Source: IPU, Nohlen et al.
