= 1975 Tanzanian general election =

← 1970	26 October 1975	1980 →
- Presidential election
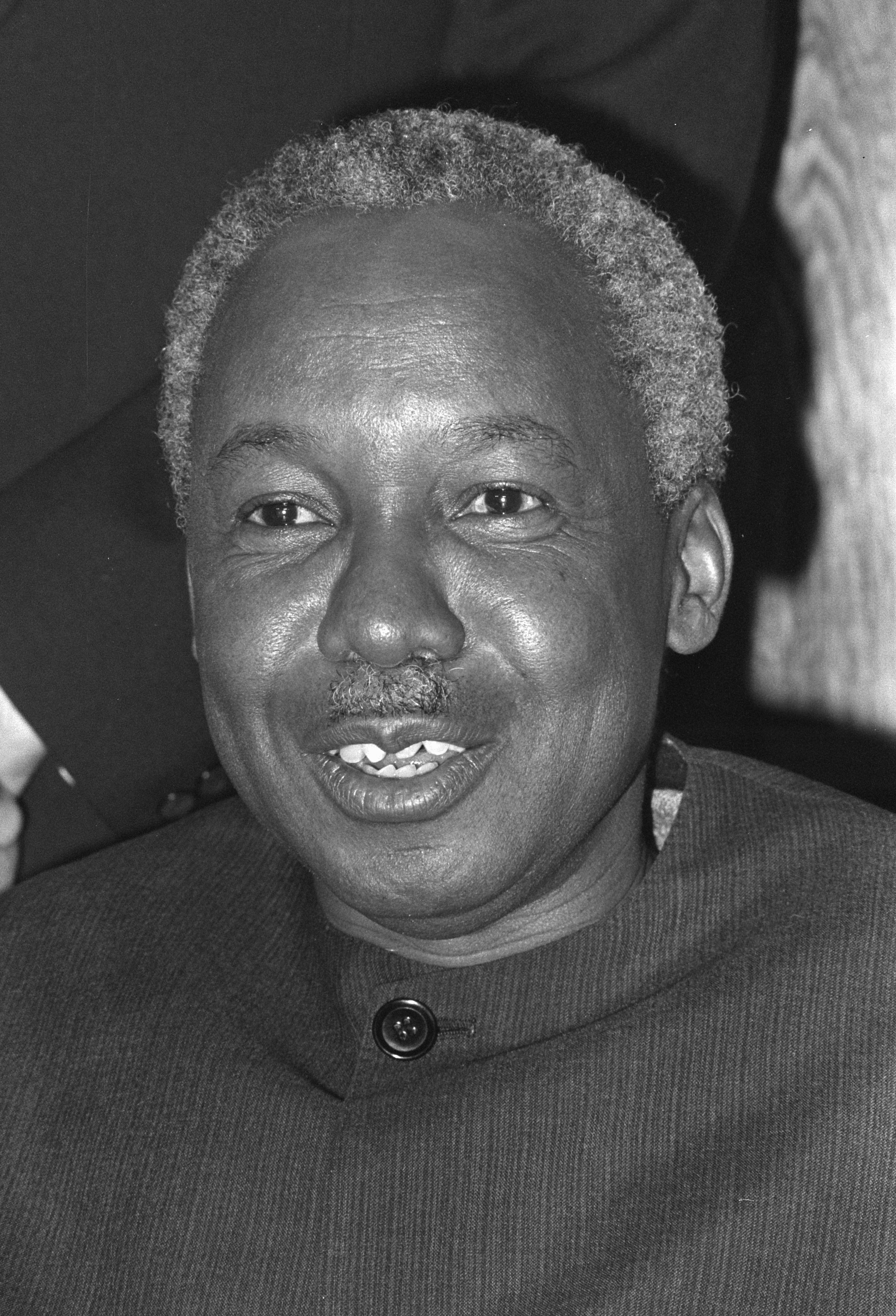
Nominee	Julius Nyerere
Party	TANU
Popular vote	4,172,267
Percentage	93.25%
President before election
Julius Nyerere
TANU
Elected President
Julius Nyerere
TANU

General elections were held in Tanzania on 26 October 1975. The country was a one-party state at the time, with the Tanganyika African National Union as the sole legal party on the mainland, and the Afro-Shirazi Party was the only party in Zanzibar. For the National Assembly election there were two candidates from the same party in each of the constituencies (although 40 were elected unopposed), whilst the presidential election was effectively a referendum on TANU leader Julius Nyerere's candidacy.

Voter turnout was 82% for both elections. The country's population was around 15 million at the time of the election.

== Results ==
=== President ===
Candidate	Party	Votes	%
Julius Nyerere	Tanganyika African National Union	4,172,267	93.25
Against		302,005	6.75
Total		4,474,272	100.00
Valid votes		4,474,272	98.17
Invalid/blank votes		83,323	1.83
Total votes		4,557,595	100.00
Registered voters/turnout		5,577,566	81.71
Source: Nohlen et al.

=== National Assembly ===
Party	Votes	%	Seats
TANU–ASP	4,474,267	100.00	96
Appointed and indirectly-elected members			127
Total	4,474,267	100.00	223
Valid votes	4,474,267	98.17	
Invalid/blank votes	83,328	1.83	
Total votes	4,557,595	100.00	
Registered voters/turnout	5,577,569	81.71	
Source: IPU, Nohlen et al.
