= Kilimanjaro (ward) =

Ward in Moshi Urban District, Kilimanjaro Region

Kilimanjaro Kata ya Kilimanjaro (Swahili)
- Ward
- Kata ya Kilimanjaro, Wilaya ya Moshi Mjini
- Location within Tanzania
- Country: Tanzania
- Region: Kilimanjaro Region
- District: Moshi District

Area
  - Total: 4.6 km^{2} (1.8 sq mi)
- Elevation: 862 m (2,828 ft)

Population (2012)
  - Total: 5,233
  - Density: 1,100/km^{2} (2,900/sq mi)

Kilimanjaro is an administrative ward in Moshi District of Kilimanjaro Region in Tanzania. The ward covers an area of 4.6 km^{2} (1.8 sq mi), and has an average elevation of 862 m (2,828 ft). According to the 2012 census, the ward has a total population of 9,206.
