= David Gordon Hines =

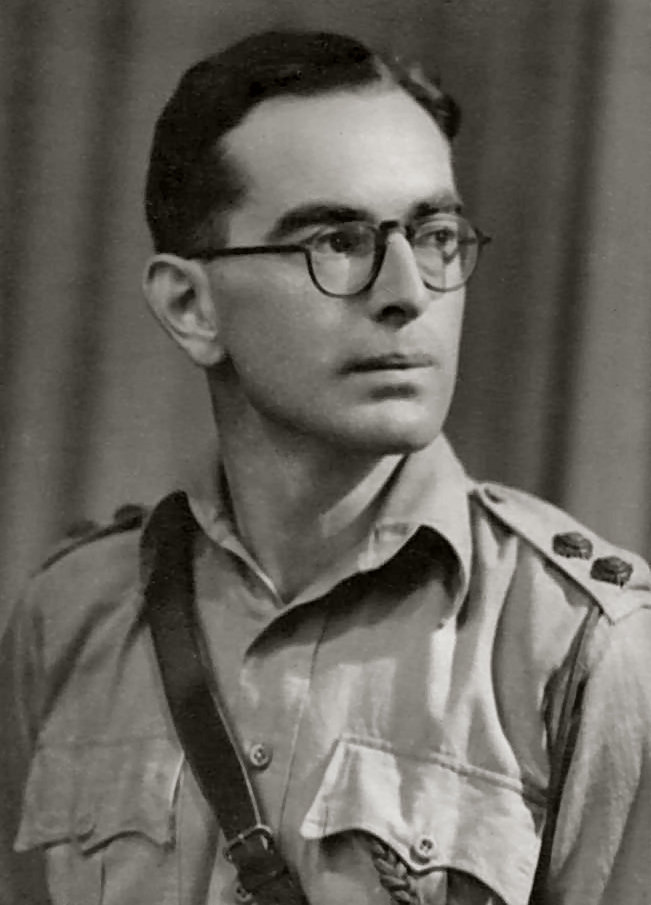
- Captain David Hines in King's African Rifles uniform, 1939
- Born: 8 February 1915; Staffordshire, England
- Died: 14 March 2000 (aged 85); Keynsham, Somerset, England
- Spouse: Bertha Grice (m. 1940; died 1995)
- Children: 3

David Gordon Hines (8 February 1915 – 14 March 2000) was a chartered accountant who as a British colonial administrator developed farming co-operatives in Tanganyika and later in Uganda. This radically improved the living standards of farmers in their transition from subsistence farming to cash crops. When he was responsible for development throughout Uganda (with about 400 staff), some 500,000 farmers joined co-operatives.

== Early life ==
David Hines was born in Fenton (now part of the potteries town Stoke-on-Trent) in Staffordshire, England on 8 February 1915. His parents lived in Margherita, Assam, India where his father managed coal mines. His grandfather William Hines had founded with his brother the Heron Cross pottery in Stoke-on-Trent. As a child away from his parents who had to live in Assam, David Hines lived with relations in Barnstaple, and boarded at Blundells School in Tiverton, both in Devon. On retirement of his father, his parents lived in Bushey near London, so David was glad to live with them and be articled in London to the accountants Cooper Brothers, travelling the country for them.

== To Kenya ==
In 1938 he sailed on a Union-Castle liner to Kenya to start work with accountants in Kisumu, only to find that his new firm had just been taken over by his old employers Cooper Brothers. He contracted malaria there like bad flu, with bad sweating — I was in bed for a few days. Only a few years earlier, Kisumu was the white man's grave because of the stagnant water around Lake Victoria. We took care not to paddle in lakes for fear of crocodiles and Bilharzia.

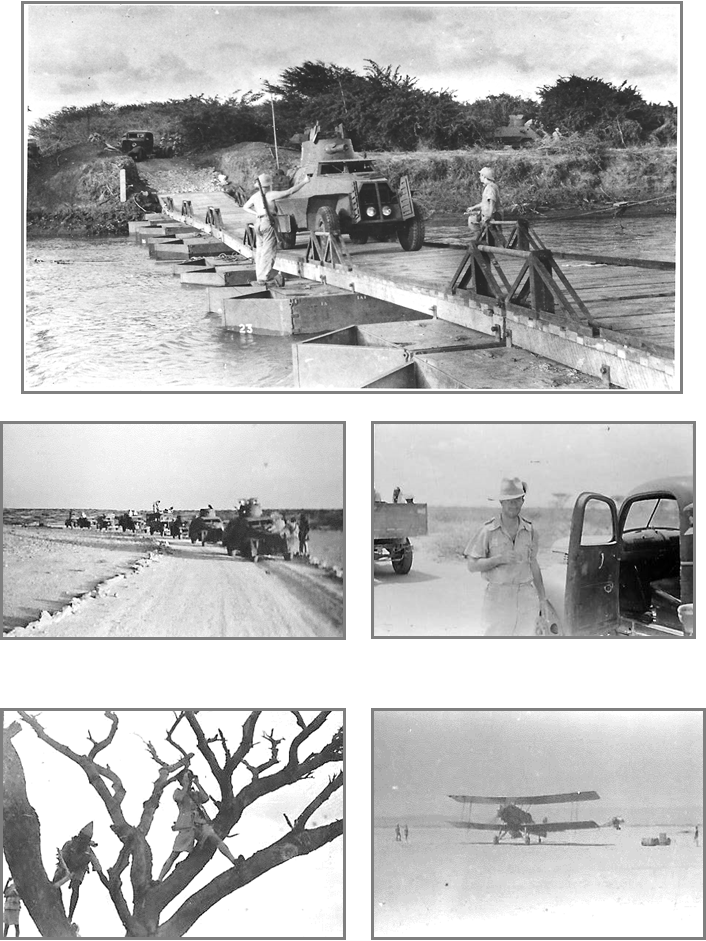
Lightly armoured cars used to fight the Italians through Kenya, Somalia, Abyssinia, and Eritrea.

== World War II ==
During the Second World War, David Hines served in Kenya, Somalia, Ethiopia, Eritrea, Madagascar, Burma and Tanganyika.

Northern Kenya's 800-mile Ethiopia border

In the 1/6 Battalion of the King's African Rifles, he commanded a squadron of 20 light-armoured cars assigned the task of defending 800 miles (1,300 km) of the northern border of Kenya against a possible Italian invasion from neighbouring Ethiopia. He spent six months with his African crews sharing eating and sleeping under tarpaulins as there were no tents. The working language was Swahili.

Marriage

While on leave in Nairobi, he was invited to be a substitute player at the Muthaiga Golf Club: he met his wife-to-be Bertha Eunice Grice (born 5 September 1909 in Chiswick, London). She asked if he owned a car: he bought a car the next day and married her within a few weeks, to have 55 happy years together, and three children. Wedding guests in Karen included as their witness George Adamson, the Baba ya Simba (father of lions in Swahili) and his wife Joy, author of the book Born Free.

At the Outspan Hotel in Kenya, Mrs Hines helped Lady Baden-Powell reply to the thousands of letters sent to her on the death in January 1941 of her husband, Robert Baden-Powell, founder of the worldwide Scout movement.

Kenya, Somalia, Ethiopia, Eritrea

In early 1941, Hines, then a captain, was in the van of General Cunningham's swift 1,900-mile (3,100 km) advance from Kenya to Addis Ababa, via Kismayo and Mogadishu in Somalia and up the one good road through Harar, Dire Dawa, and Awash. With iron rations while advancing in light armoured cars, they captured thousands of Italian troops. They confiscated their arms and many supplies, and (following instructions) left the prisoners for other troops who followed behind. In Addis Ababa, Hines helped rescue numerous Italians and Germans who had surrendered; he saw many others beside the roads who had been crucified by the local Shifta people.

On one occasion, while crossing the River Kolito in Eritrea, David Hines witnessed the heroism and death of Nigel Gray Leakey (a relative of Louis Leakey, famous for anthropological discoveries in East Africa) that led to Leakey beiny awarded the Victoria Cross.

One night on the Eritrean border, an elephant lost a leg after treading on a landmine that was defending the camp. At first light, Hines and two askaris tracked the elephant for 20 miles (32 km) before putting it out of its misery.

Madagascar, Burma

After invading the then Vichy French island of Madagascar in 1942, Hines was trained there for jungle warfare. He and most soldiers were then shipped to fight the Japanese in the Burmese jungles.

Tanganyika wheat scheme

In Burma, Hines was almost immediately sent back to Arusha in north Tanganyika, to be the accountant of the 100,000-acre Tanganyika wheat scheme near Mount Kilimanjaro, Ngorongoro, and the Ardai plains; planned by the UK and USA to help feed post-war-ravaged Europe. The USA had sent 30 of everything: tractors, ploughs, harvesters, harrows, the lot. We had agricultural officers and engineers. The workers were mostly Italian prisoners of war from Somalia and Eritrea -- excellent engineers and mechanics.

== Tanganyika 1947 to 1959 ==
Hines was employed in Dar es Salaam, Tanganyika (now Tanzania) by the Colonial Office to develop farming co-operatives throughout Tanganyika: even by the early 1950s, there were over 400 co-operatives operational, despite vast areas of central and southern Tanganyika being plagued by Tsetse fly, making them unsuitable for agriculture and cattle raising. Previously, farmers had sold their produce to Indian traders at low prices. The farmers gained more favourable prices for their crops by forming co-operatives and selling their produce in bulk.

== Uganda 1959 to 1965 ==
In 1959, Hines was promoted to be Commissioner of Co-operatives for Uganda reporting to the Governor. With a staff of 400. they advised groups of 100 to 150 farmers on how best to establish a co-operative, defining the constitution and accounting. At meetings he would encourage establishment of co-operatives, listen to farmers' problems, and give speeches to encourage progress.

At a typical initial meeting, he would speak in English with multiple interpreters speaking the local languages. After a while, the meeting would agree to switch to Swahili, despite Ugandans being wary of Swahili, the language used by earlier Arab slavers.

With government money, the co-operatives built cotton ginneries, tobacco dryers and maize mills: and exported coffee and cotton. In the three years after Uganda's 1962 independence, David Hines reported to the Uganda Government Minister Matthias Ngobi.

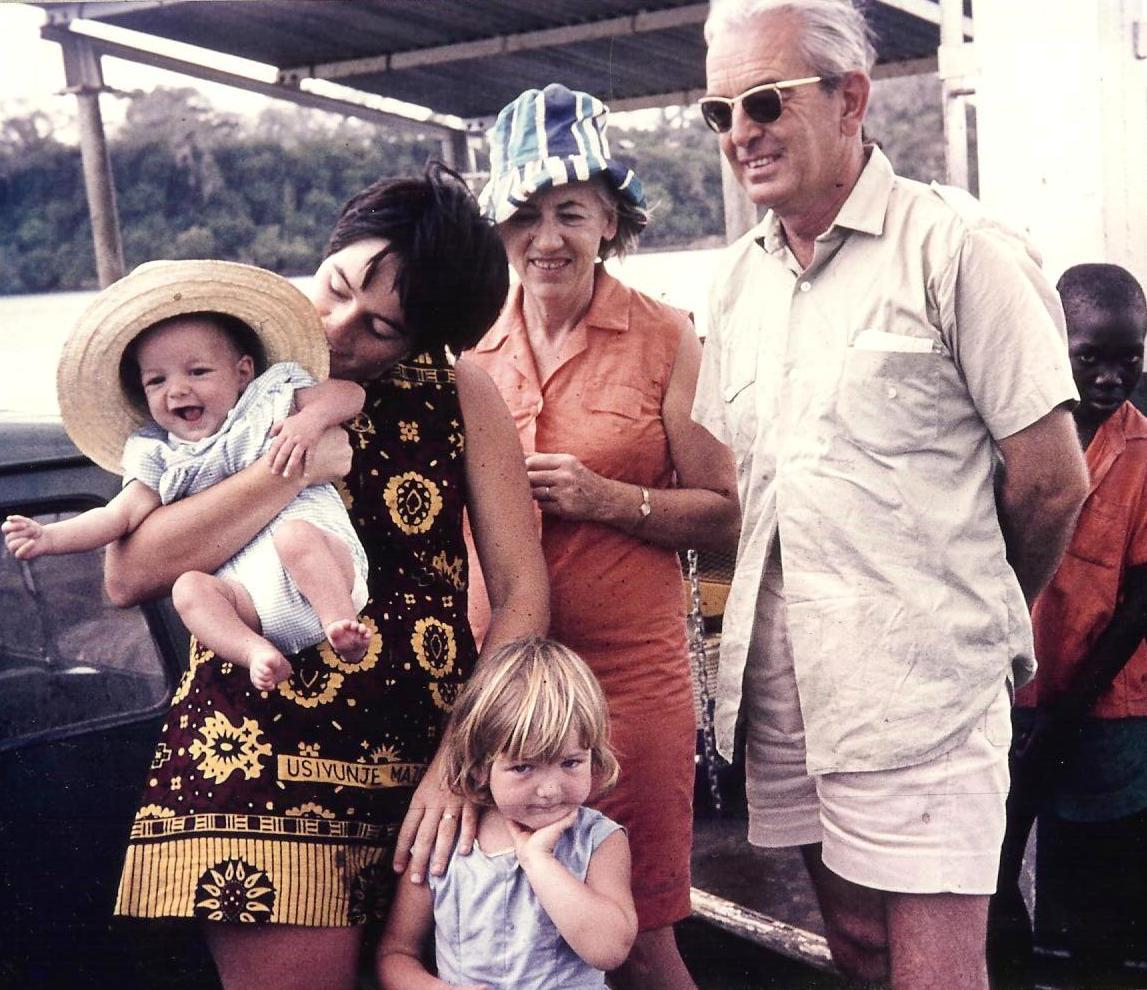
Kilifi ferry, Kenya coast / Indian Ocean, 1969, family from England photo

== Kenya 1966 to 1972 ==
Hines was seconded by the UK to advise the Kenya Minister of Agriculture particularly about the "Million-acre scheme" to buy expatriate farms mostly in the Kenya highlands.

== Aircraft and car crashes ==
Once in a small RAF Dove in northern Kenya, early in the war, the runway was rather damp. The plane flipped over as we landed: the pilot was killed, and the rest of us were left hanging upside down in our seat belts.

In the early 1950s in up-country Tanganyika, our Wilson Airways Dove Rapide ran into a ditch on landing: the pilot asked for some plyers to disconnect the battery!! We pushed the plane out of the ditch, but the propellers were bent.

The only car smash I can remember was when Beb [David's wife] and I hit a buffalo or buck in the dark coming down from the Kinangop to a dance at the Naivasha Club -- but it only broke a headlamp.

== Retirement ==
Hines and his wife retired to England.

== Three-months 1982 World Bank delegation to devastated Uganda ==
Due to their years working in Uganda and both speaking Swahili, Hines and a veterinary specialist were surprised to be telephoned in their homes by the World Bank to join a delegation of Americans to go to Uganda to get it started again after the Idi Amin dictatorship era of thousands of tortures and massacres.

Hines found Kampala appalling: nothing worked; there was no water, no electricity, no sanitation, no food, nothing in the shops. Lifts in a government building did not work: there was automatic gunfire in the street below. He had vivid 1959 to 1965 memories of civilised and safe Kampala for their family including two very active teenage daughters.

Around the country we had an escort of soldiers. I met some people who I had known … they were delighted to see me. Everybody had lost relatives and friends, and many spoke of torture. On safari north and south, we lived on goats and bananas. Up north, I met an old man who recognised me: he flung himself on the ground and said "You've come back, you've come back". In all the fine hotels, everything had been removed – baths, basins, lavatories – and if you were lucky, someone brought you a tin of hot water to shave.

Following our recommendations, the World Bank brought in money, two accountants, and various agricultural officers and engineers.

== Family ==
David Hines died of prostate cancer in Keynsham Hospital, near Bristol on 14 March 2000. His wife died 29 July 1995 in their Kingsdown house. He had a son, Peter Hines, who was a civil engineer, and two daughters.
