= Queen of Tanganyika =

Elizabeth II's reign in Tanganyika from 1961 to 1962

- Coat of arms of Tanganyika

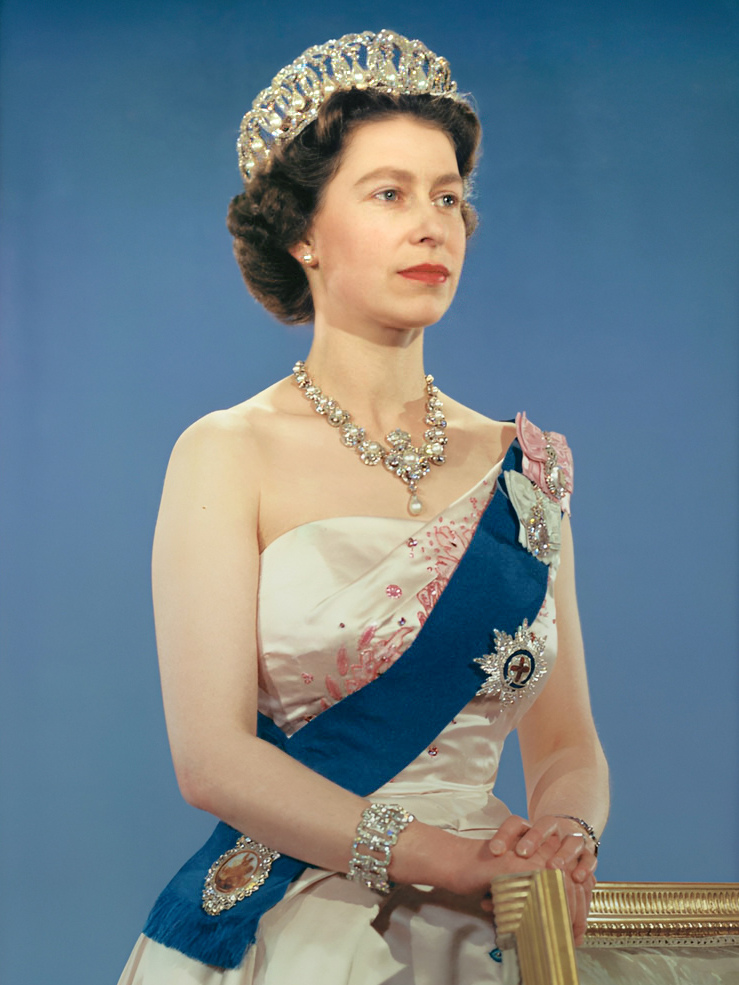
- Elizabeth II

Details
- Style: Her Majesty
- Formed: 9 December 1961
- Abolished: 9 December 1962

Elizabeth II was Queen of Tanganyika from 1961 to 1962, when Tanganyika was an independent sovereign state and a constitutional monarchy. She was also the monarch of other sovereign states, including the United Kingdom. Her constitutional roles in Tanganyika were mostly delegated to the governor-general of Tanganyika.

== History ==
The monarchy was created by the Tanganyika Independence Act 1961 (10 & 11 Eliz. 2. c. 1) which transformed the United Nations trust territory of Tanganyika into an independent sovereign constitutional monarchy.

External videos
- Tanganyika Independent (1961) Source: British Pathé.

Prince Philip, Duke of Edinburgh represented the Queen of Tanganyika at the independence celebrations. On 9 December 1961, the duke presented Tanganyika's instrument of independence to Julius Nyerere, who then became the Prime Minister of independent Tanganyika. Dar es Salaam was made a city, when the duke presented the royal charter and letters patent. He was then made the first Freeman of Dar es Salaam, and afterwards told the gathering: "A new mantle of dignity and responsibility has fallen on the citizens of Dar es Salaam". On 11 December, the duke formally opened the first session of the parliament of independent Tanganyika, on behalf of the Queen, before an assembly of people and diplomats, at a ceremony of pomp and colour. Richard Turnbull, the Governor-General, addressed the duke, asking him to open Parliament by reading the Speech from the Throne.

== Constitutional role ==
The flag of the Tanganyikan Governor-General featuring the St Edward's Crown.

Tanganyika was one of the realms of the Commonwealth of Nations that shared the same person as Sovereign and head of state.

Effective with the Tanganyika Independence Act 1961, no British government minister could advise the sovereign on any matters pertaining to Tanganyika, meaning that on all matters of Tanganyika, the monarch was advised solely by Tanganyikan ministers of the Crown. All Tanganyikan bills required Royal assent. The Tanganyikan monarch was represented in the realm by the Governor-General of Tanganyika, who was appointed by the monarch on the advice of the Tanganyikan Prime Minister.

=== The Crown and Government ===
The Government of Tanganyika was officially known as Her Majesty's Government.

The Tanganyikan monarch and the National Assembly of Tanganyika constituted the Parliament of Tanganyika. All executive powers of Tanganyika rested with the sovereign. All laws in Tanganyika were enacted only with the granting of royal assent, done by the Governor-General on behalf of the sovereign. The Governor-General could reserve a bill "for the Queen's pleasure"; that is withhold his consent to the bill and present it to the sovereign for her personal decision; or he could veto it completely by withholding his assent therefrom. The Governor-General was also responsible for summoning, proroguing, and dissolving Parliament. The Governor-General had the power to choose and appoint the Council of Ministers and could dismiss them under his discretion. All Tanganyikan ministers of the Crown held office at the pleasure of the Governor-General.

=== The Crown and the Courts ===
The highest court of appeal for Tanganyika was the Judicial Committee of the Privy Council. The monarch, and by extension the governor-general, could also grant immunity from prosecution, exercise the royal prerogative of mercy, and pardon offences against the Crown, either before, during, or after a trial.

== Royal style and titles ==
The proclamation of the Queen's style and titles published in the Tanganyika Gazette

By a proclamation, published in the Tanganyika Gazette in January 1962, the monarch adopted separate style and titles in her role as Queen of Tanganyika.

Elizabeth II had the following style and titles in her role as the monarch of Tanganyika:

- 9 December 1961 – 16 December 1961: Elizabeth the Second, by the Grace of God, of the United Kingdom of Great Britain and Northern Ireland and of Her other Realms and Territories Queen, Head of the Commonwealth, Defender of the Faith
- 16 December 1961 – 9 December 1962: Elizabeth the Second, Queen of Tanganyika and of Her Other Realms and Territories, Head of the Commonwealth

== Public perception ==
The Round Table: The Commonwealth Journal of International Affairs wrote:

On December 9, 1961, when Tanganyika became independent, it suddenly became a monarchy with the monarch as Queen of Tanganyika. But the British monarchy was regarded as a foreign institution and the new position increased the sense of alienation from the Crown. It is made clear, however, that the proposal to become a republic does not imply any disrespect towards the person of the Queen, whose position as Head of the Commonwealth is readily acknowledged ... The chief, as the leader of the tribe, still holds a position of great importance in most areas ... by and large the chiefs have retained the affection and loyalty of their people and since it is a monarchical system, it might be thought that the idea of monarchy was acceptable to the people and that in some areas it was strongly entrenched. There is, however, a difference between the monarchical idea of chieftainship and that of an alien monarch who is a European and who lives thousands of miles away and is never seen. The days have gone when the English sovereign can be expected to command the personal loyalty of African subjects in the same way as people of British origin.

== Abolition ==
The Tanganyikan monarchy was abolished on 9 December 1962, and Tanganyika became a republic within the Commonwealth with the president of Tanganyika as head of state.

The Queen sent a message to the new President Julius Nyerere, in which she said:

I send you my warmest good wishes on the occasion of the inauguration of the Republic of Tanganyika and your assumption of office as the first President. I have followed your country's development with close attention and shall always watch the friendliest interest Tanganyika's endeavours and achievements in the years ahead. It is a source of great satisfaction to me that your country remains within the Commonwealth, and I am confident that the many bonds of friendship and understanding between our peoples will be maintained and strengthened.

Tanganyika merged with Zanzibar in 1964 after the Zanzibar Revolution to form Tanzania. Queen Elizabeth visited Tanzania on 19–22 July 1979, visiting Arusha, Dar es Salaam, Zanzibar, and Kilimanjaro.

== Gallery ==
Celebrations of the coronation of Elizabeth II in Tanganyika

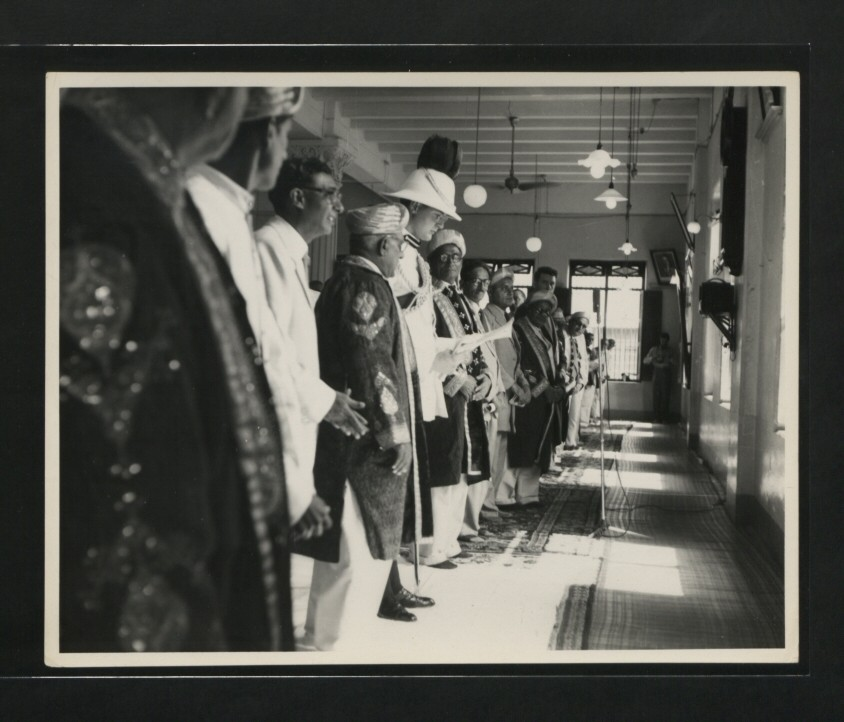
Prayers for the Queen being said at the Jamat Khana by Ismailis and others

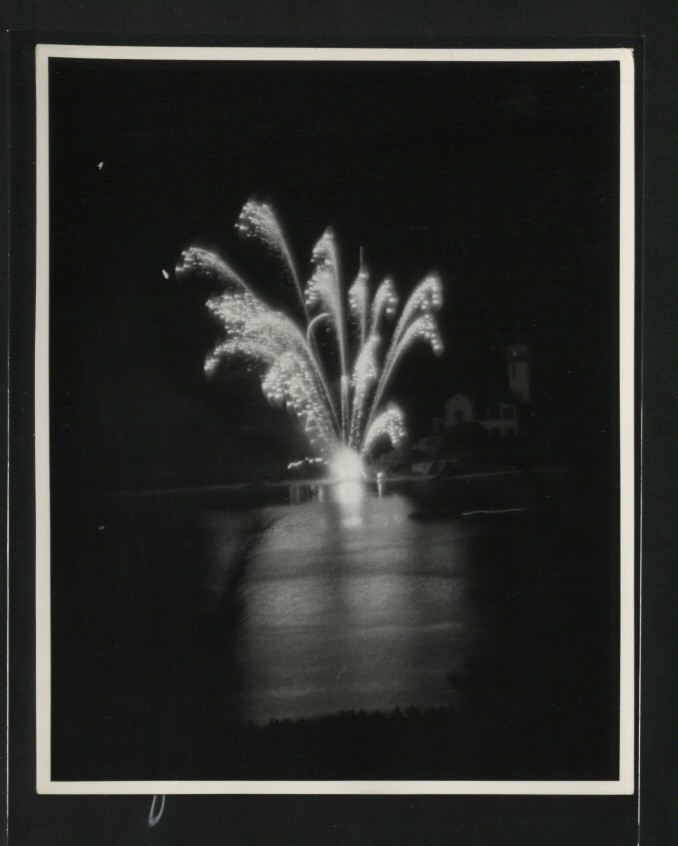
Fireworks display on Coronation Day

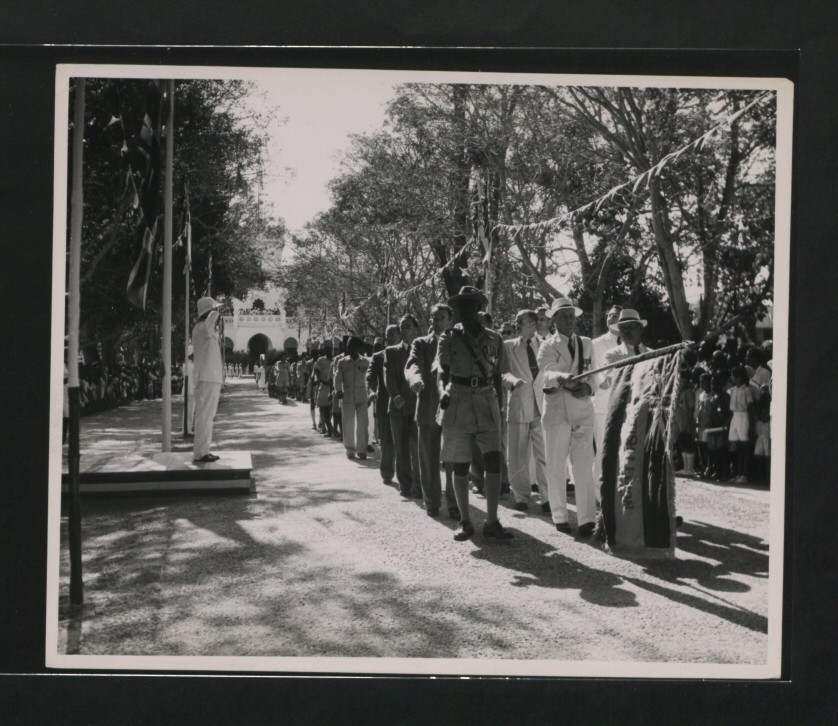
Promulgation of Coronation and march past on 3 June

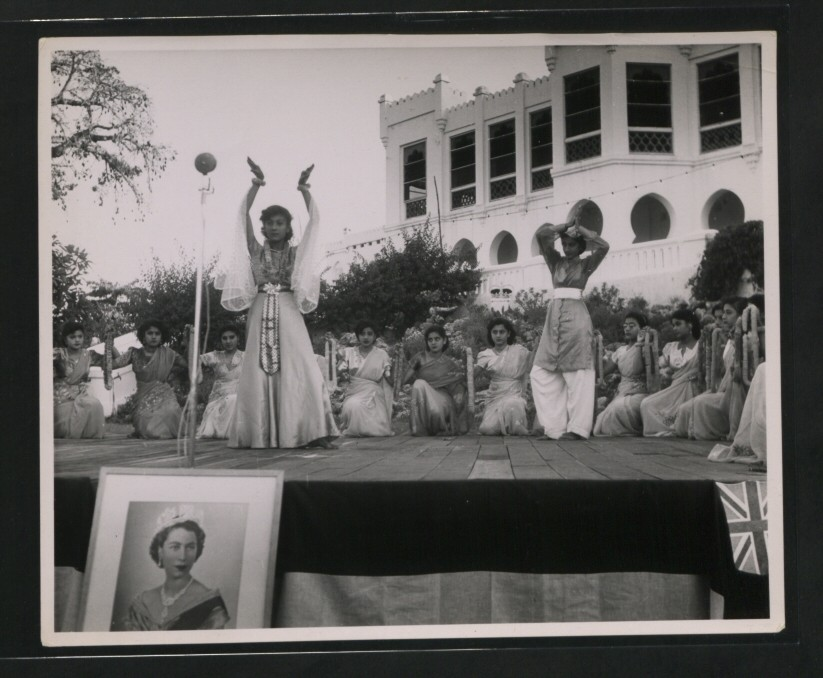
Inter-racial children's pageant

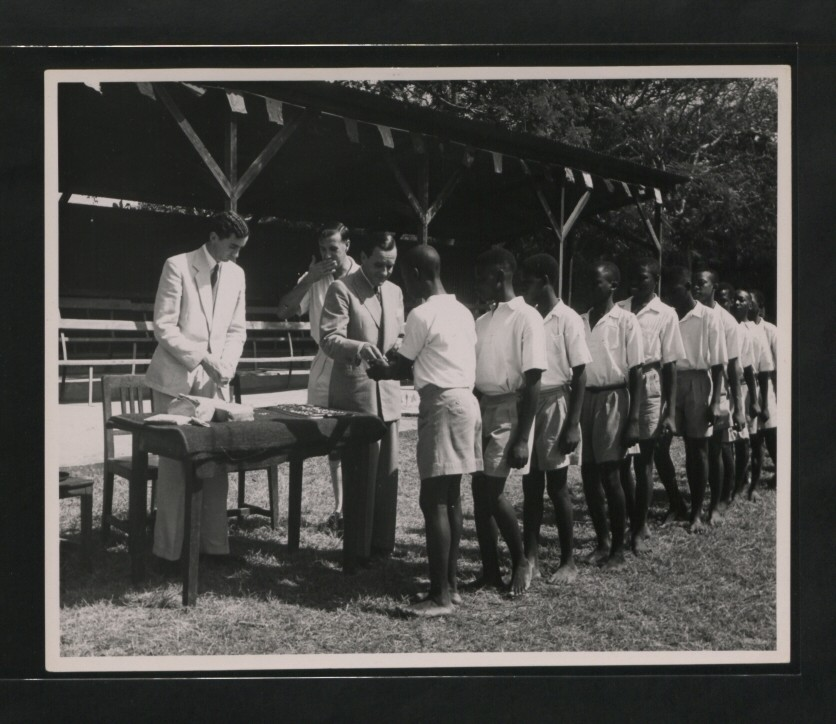
Presentation of souvenir medallions to schoolchildren

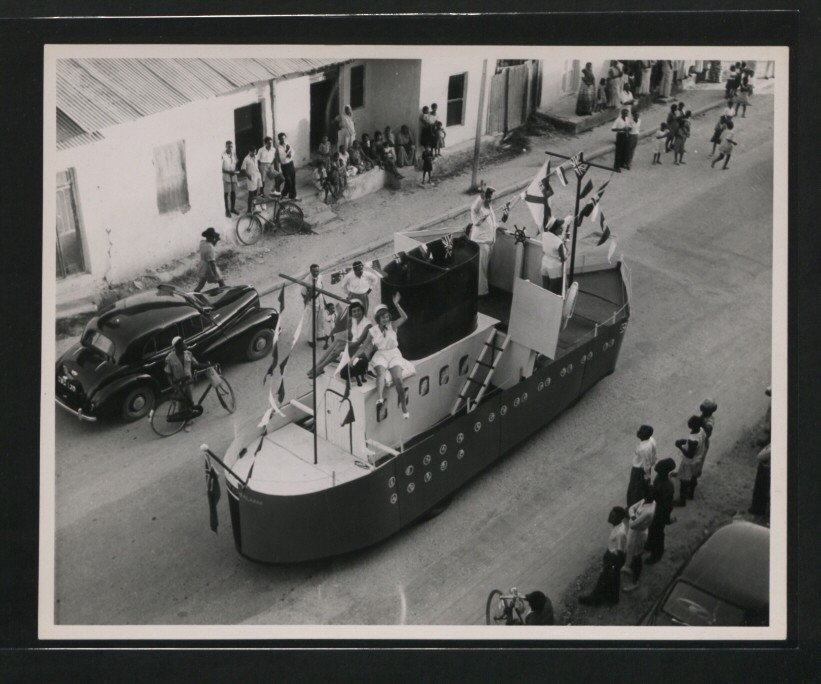
Carnival procession on 6 June
