= Tanganyika African Association =

Defunct political association in Tanzania

- Founded: 1929
- Dissolved: July 1954
- Preceded by: Tanganyika Territory African Civil Service Association
- Succeeded by: Tanganyika African National Union
- Headquarters: Tanganyika Territory
- Ideology: African nationalism

The Tanganyika African Association (TAA) was a Tanganyika Territory political party, formed in 1929. It was founded by civil servants including Ali Saidi, members of an earlier association called the Tanganyika Territory African Civil Service Association (founded by Martin Kayamba(1891-1940) in 1922). After World War II, TAA expanded countrywide in towns and in rural areas, and in 1948, the number of branches had increased to 39. It was transformed into the Tanganyika African National Union (TANU) in 1954 by Julius Nyerere.
