= 1965 Tanzanian general election =

- September 1965
- Presidential election
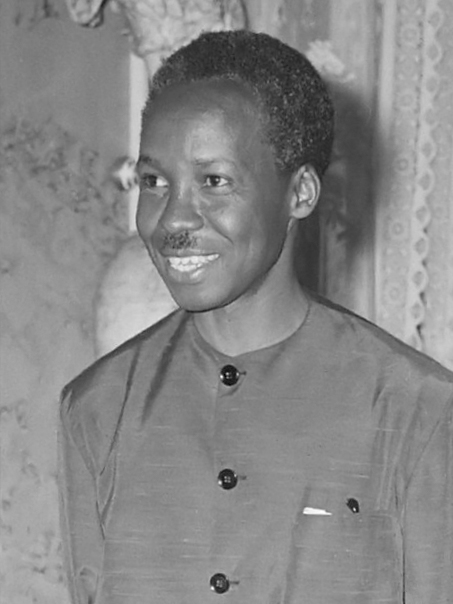
Nominee	Julius Nyerere
Party	TANU
Popular vote	2,520,904
Percentage	96.60%
President before election
Julius Nyerere
TANU
Elected President
Julius Nyerere
TANU

General elections were held for the first time in the newly formed Union of Tanzania in September 1965. The country had also just become a one-party state, with the Tanganyika African National Union as the sole legal party on the mainland, and the Afro-Shirazi Party was the only party in Zanzibar. For the National Assembly election there were two candidates from the same party in each constituency, whilst the presidential election was effectively a referendum on TANU leader Julius Nyerere's candidacy.

Voter turnout was 72% in the National Assembly election and 83% in the presidential election, although only 32.5% of the country's 9.8 million residents were registered.

In addition to the elected MPs, there were a further 94 unelected members; the 32 members of the Zanzibar Revolutionary Council, 20 members nominated from Zanzibar, 17 regional commissioners, 15 members chosen by the National Assembly, and up to 10 members nominated by the president.

== Results ==
=== President ===
Candidate	Party	Votes	%
Julius Nyerere	Tanganyika African National Union	2,520,904	96.60
Against		88,600	3.40
Total		2,609,504	100.00
Valid votes		2,609,504	98.99
Invalid/blank votes		26,537	1.01
Total votes		2,636,041	100.00
Registered voters/turnout		3,187,215	82.71
Source: Nohlen et al.

=== National Assembly ===
Party	Votes	%	Seats
Tanganyika African National Union	2,081,642	91.95	157
Afro-Shirazi Party	182,188	8.05	31
Total	2,263,830	100.00	188
Valid votes	2,263,830	98.87	
Invalid/blank votes	25,772	1.13	
Total votes	2,289,602	100.00	
Registered voters/turnout	3,187,215	71.84	
Source: Nohlen et al. One party democracy
