= 1990 Tanzanian general election =

- 28 October 1990
- Presidential election
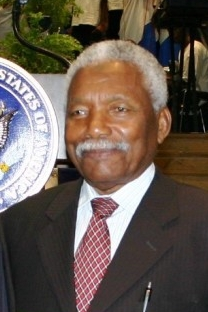
Nominee	Ali Hassan Mwinyi
Party	CCM
Popular vote	5,198,120
Percentage	97.79%
President before election
Ali Hassan Mwinyi
CCM
Elected President
Ali Hassan Mwinyi
CCM

General elections were held in Tanzania on 28 October 1990. The country was a one-party state at the time, with the Chama Cha Mapinduzi as the sole legal party. For the National Assembly election there were two candidates from the same party in each constituencies, whilst the presidential election was effectively a referendum on CCM leader Ali Hassan Mwinyi's candidacy.

The number of constituencies was increased from 119 to 130. Voter turnout was 74% of the 7,296,553 registered voters.

Following the lifting of the ban on other political parties in 1992, this was the last one-party election to be held in Tanzania.

== Results ==
=== President ===
Candidate	Party	Votes	%
Ali Hassan Mwinyi	Chama Cha Mapinduzi	5,198,120	97.79
Against		117,366	2.21
Total		5,315,486	100.00
Valid votes		5,315,486	97.98
Invalid/blank votes		109,796	2.02
Total votes		5,425,282	100.00
Registered voters/turnout		7,296,553	74.35
Source: Nohlen et al.

=== National Assembly ===
Party	Votes	%	Seats
Chama Cha Mapinduzi	5,007,027	100.00	180
Appointed and indirectly-elected members			104
Total	5,007,027	100.00	284
Valid votes	5,007,027	92.29	
Invalid/blank votes	418,255	7.71	
Total votes	5,425,282	100.00	
Registered voters/turnout	7,296,553	74.35	
Source: IPU, Nohlen et al.
