= Tanganyika African National Union =

1961–1977 ruling party of Tanganyika then Tanzania

- Leader: Julius Nyerere
- Founded: 5 July 1954 (71 years, 353 days)
- Dissolved: 5 January 1977 (49 years, 169 days)
- Preceded by: Tanganyika African Association
- Succeeded by: Chama cha Mapinduzi
- Headquarters: Dar Es Salaam, Tanzania
- Ideology: African nationalism African socialism Democratic socialism Ujamaa
- Political position: Left-wing

Party flag

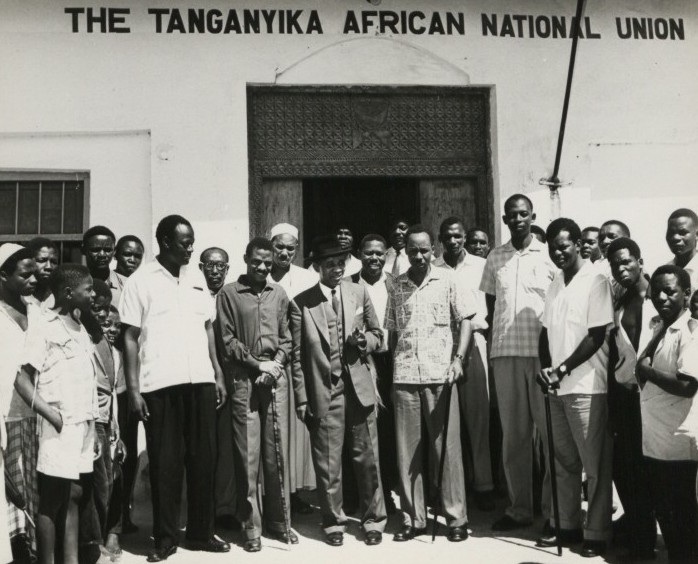

The Tanganyika African National Union (TANU) was the principal political party in the struggle for sovereignty in the East African state of Tanganyika (now Tanzania). The party was formed from the Tanganyika African Association by seventeen founders on 7 July 1954, namely S. M. Kitwana, Kisung'uta Gabara, John Rupia, Japhet Nkura Kirilo, Mwalimu Julius Kambarage Nyerere, Germano Pacha, Abubakar Ilanga, Joseph Kimalando, Dossa Aziz, Tewa Said Tewa, Constantine Oswald Milinga, Lameck Makaranga Bugohe, Patrick George Kunambi, Joseph Kasella Bantu, Ally Sykes, Abdulwahid Sykes and Saadan Abdul Kandoro. From 1964, the party was called the Tanzania African National Union. On 5 February 1977, the TANU merged with the ruling party in Zanzibar, the Afro-Shirazi Party (ASP), to form the current Revolutionary State Party or Chama Cha Mapinduzi (CCM). The policy of TANU was to build and maintain a socialist state aiming towards economic self-sufficiency and to eradicate corruption and exploitation, with the major means of production and exchange under the control of the peasants and workers (Ujamaa-Essays on Socialism; "The Arusha Declaration").

Julius Nyerere was the first President of Tanzania, serving from the 1960s to 1985. In 1962, Nyerere and TANU created the Ministry of National Culture and Youth. Nyerere felt the creation of the ministry was necessary in order to deal with some of the challenges and contradictions of building a nation-state and a national culture after 70 years of colonialism. The government of Tanzania sought to create an innovative public space where Tanzanian popular culture could develop and flourish. By incorporating the varied traditions and customs of all the people of Tanzania, Nyerere hoped to promote a sense of pride, thus creating a national culture.

== Electoral history ==
=== Presidential elections ===
Election	Party candidate	Votes	%	Result
1962	Julius Nyerere	1,127,987	98.1%	Elected ✓
1965	Julius Nyerere	2,520,904	96.5%	Elected ✓
1970	Julius Nyerere	3,220,636	96.7%	Elected ✓
1975	Julius Nyerere	4,172,267	93.3%	Elected ✓

=== Bunge elections ===
Election	Party leader	Votes	%	Seats	+/–	Position	Result
1958–59	Julius Nyerere	47,685	74.4%	30 / 64	▲30	▲1st	Supermajority government
1960	Julius Nyerere	100,581	82.8%	70 / 71	▲40	1st	Supermajority government
1965	Julius Nyerere	2,263,830 in alliance with ASP	100%	188 / 188	▲118	1st	Sole legal party
1970	Julius Nyerere	in alliance with ASP	66.6%	106 / 106	▼82	1st	Sole legal party
1975	Julius Nyerere	4,474,267 in alliance with ASP	100%	223 / 223	▲117	1st	Sole legal party

Notes

In the 1958–59 TANU won all seats contested; the remaining 34 seats were appointed.

The Afro-Shirazi party was the sole legal party in Zanzibar, which is an autonomous region.
