= Godfrey Mwakikagile =

Tanzanian writer and scholar (born 1949)

- Born: 4 October 1949 (age 77); Kigoma, Tanganyika Territory
- Education: Wayne State University (1975)
- Occupations: scholar, author and news reporter
- Writing career
- Genre: African studies
- Notable works: Nyerere and Africa: End of an Era (2002)

Godfrey Mwakikagile (born 4 October 1949 in Kigoma) is a Tanzanian scholar and author specialising in African studies. He was also a news reporter for The Standard (later renamed the Daily News) — the oldest and largest English newspaper in Tanzania and one of the three largest in East Africa. Mwakikagile wrote Nyerere and Africa: End of an Era — a biographical book on the life of former Tanzanian President Julius Nyerere set in the backdrop of Africa's early post-colonial years and the liberation wars in the countries of southern Africa in which Nyerere played a major role.

Growing up in the 1950s, Mwakikagile experienced a form of apartheid and racial segregation in Tanganyika, what is now mainland Tanzania, and wrote about it in some of his works, as he did about the political climate of Tanganyika during the colonial era, in books such as Reflections on Race Relations: A Personal Odyssey, Life in Tanganyika in The Fifties and Life under British Colonial Rule. There were segregated schools, toilets, hotels and residential areas. Nyerere was one of the victims when he was denied service – a cup of tea – at a hotel in Mwanza in 1953 and a glass of beer at the old New Africa Hotel in Dar es Salaam in the same year, not long before he became the national leader of the independence movement in 1954. He returned to Tanganyika in October 1952 after earning a master's degree from the University of Edinburgh in Scotland. John Malecela, who later became prime minister and vice president of Tanzania, was also denied service in 1957 at the old New Africa Hotel. He stated in an interview "Ana kwa ana na Malecela" with Mwananchi, a Swahili newspaper, on 30 July 2014, that the hotel owner came with a policeman and told him he could not stay there as a black person.

Amir Abedi, the first African mayor of Dar es Salaam in 1960 who went on to serve as Minister of Justice and later as Minister of Education and Culture after independence was denied service at Palm Beach Hotel in Dar es Salaam in 1961. He was told by the hotel owner no blacks were allowed inside. The hotel owner, a Swiss, was expelled from Tanganyika within 48 hours, as Godfrey Mwakikagile stated in his books Nyerere and Africa: End of an Era and Reflections on Race Relations: A Personal Odyssey. Andrew Nyerere, President Nyerere's eldest child and a schoolmate of Mwakikagile, narrated the incident to Mwakikagile in 2002 when Mwakikagile was writing Nyerere and Africa: End of an Era:

'As you remember, Sheikh Amir Abedi was the first mayor of Dar es Salaam. Soon after independence, the mayor went to Palm Beach Hotel (near our high school, Tambaza, on United Nations Road in Upanga). There was a sign at the hotel which clearly stated: 'No Africans and dogs allowed inside.' He was blocked from entering the hotel, and said in protest, 'But I am the Mayor.' Still he was told, 'You will not get in.' Shortly thereafter, the owner of the hotel was given 48 hours to leave the country. When the nationalization exercise began, that hotel was the first to be nationalized.'

The incident is cited in Godfrey Mwakikagile, Nyerere and Africa: End of an Era, pp. 501 – 502.

British journalist Trevor Grundy who lived and worked in Tanzania for a number of years and worked at The Standard during the same time Godfrey Mwakikagile did stated in "Julius Nyerere Reconsidered," 4 May 2015, that the British practised apartheid in Tanganyika and turned the country into an apartheid state but without declaring that it was one. He said it was British-style apartheid and that was their secret: not to give racial segregation a name as if segregation did not exist in Tanganyika. That is what Mwakikagile experienced in the 1950s under British rule, as he explains in his books, in which he recalls using segregated facilities including toilets labelled "Africans," "Asians," and "Europeans." Arabs, a significant minority in Tanganyika, were classified "Asians" in the segregation of facilities. There were no segregated facilities labelled "Arabs." Facilities for Africans were inadequate and substandard.

People of mixed race called half-castes did not have separate facilities. They were classified and treated as a part of the native African population and did not have any special privileges under segregation in colonial Tanganyika. They shared facilities including toilets and schools with blacks, not with Asians and Arabs. Godfrey Mwakikagile has stated in some of his autobiographical writings including Reflections on Race Relations: A Personal Odyssey that he went to school with some of them when he was in middle school from Standard Five to Standard Eight from 1961 to 1964.

There was segregation in Tanganyika even after independence. One of the victims was Ahmed Sékou Touré, president of Guinea and close friend of President Nyerere, who, together with his delegation, was snubbed at the Safari Hotel in Arusha in 1963 when he went there for lunch led by Tanganyika's Minister of Foreign Affairs, Oscar Kambona, as Professor Lawrence Mbogoni stated in his article, “Racism and Racial Discrimination In Early Independent Tanzania,” AWAAZ Voices Magazine, Volume 17, Issue 2, 2020. Mwakikagile has written about many incidents of racial discrimination and segregation in Tanganyika, later Tanzania, in his books during the colonial and post-colonial period.

Even as late as the early 1970s, ten years after independence, Forodhani Hotel and New Palace Hotel in Dar es Salaam still had signs saying “Europeans,” although they were open to people of all races after the end of colonial rule but not right away. The hotel owners were slow in removing the signs because there was still resistance to racial integration even after independence. Mwakikagile has stated in his writings that he saw those signs when he was a student at Tambaza High School and when he was a news reporter in Dar es Salaam and has been cited in the writings of other writers, among them, Echoes of the Savannah: The Life and Works of Godfrey Mwakikagile.

== Early life and family ==
Mwakikagile was born on 4 October 1949 into a middle class Tanganyikan family at Kilimani Hospital, a government hospital in the town of Kigoma, Western Province of Tanganyika – what is now mainland Tanzania – his sister Maria at a Catholic hospital in nearby Ujiji on 1 April 1951, his brother Lawrence at a government hospital in Morogoro in Eastern Province, a coastal region, on 29 September 1952. Besides Kigoma and Morogoro, Tanga and Muheza, his father also worked as a medical assistant in Kilosa, Eastern Province. And his brother Lawrence years later became a captain in the Tanzania People's Defence Forces (TPDF).

His parents moved from Tanga to Kigoma in May 1949 five months before he was born. They lived in Muheza and Tanga where his father worked as a medical assistant in the late 1940s. His paternal grandfather Kasisika Mwakikagile who came from Mwaya (Mwaja) in what is now Kyela District, also lived and worked in Tanga first, then in Muheza, years earlier in the 1930s. He died in Muheza in 1937 and was buried at Power Station, Muheza, Eastern Province, the year after his son Elijah started school in 1936 in Standard One at Tukuyu Primary School in Rungwe District in the Southern Highlands Province also simply known as Southern Highlands.

His son Elijah Mwakikagile was also born in Kyela – Lwangwa, Busale ward – but grew up in Rungwe District of which Kyela District was once a part. He had an older son William Mwakikagile who was also born in Kyela and moved to Northern Rhodesia, renamed Zambia, in 1943 and never returned to Tanganyika. He died in Zambia in the 1990s. His grandson Godfrey who lived in different parts of Tanganyika since birth also spent some of his early years in Rungwe District. He also lived in Kyela – Kandete, Itope ward – for some time when he was a child, according to his autobiographical writings. Godfrey's paternal grandmother Laheli Kasuka Mwaibanje, who also once lived with her husband in Kyela where their son Elijah was born, came from Mpata village in the ward of Kabula in Selya, Busokelo, in the eastern part of Rungwe District.

Godfrey's paternal great-grandfather, the father of his grandmother Laheli Kasuka, was Kasofu Mwamwaja (Mwaibanje) from Masoko, the heartland of Rungwe District. Kasofu Mwamwaja named his daughter Kasuka (Mwakasuka) after his mother who was Godfrey's great-great-grandmother. She was named after her paternal grandmother according to custom, a practice common among members of their ethnic group. Kasuka was the mother of Kasofu Mwamwaja.

Godfrey's other paternal great-grandfather was Mwakalinga from Mwaja, Kyela. Mwakalinga's other family names were Mwapwele and Mwamanyeta. Mwakalinga was the father of Godfrey's grandfather Kasisika Mwakikagile.

His paternal great-grandmother, Mary Iseke (Mwaiseke) from Makete in Rungwe District who was the mother of his grandmother Laheli Kasuka, was among the earliest Christian converts in the district. She was married to Kasofu Mwamwaja.

Godfrey's father Elijah Mwakikagile, who once worked at the world-famous Amani Research Institute in Muheza District in the late forties, was a medical assistant during the British colonial era. He worked in different parts of Tanganyika and was one of the few medical assistants in the entire country of 10 million people. As Professor John Iliffe stated in his book East African Doctors: A History of the Modern Profession, there were fewer than 300 medical assistants and fewer than 10 doctors in Tanganyika in the forties and fifties and only 12 doctors at independence from the United Kingdom on 9 December 1961. Medical assistants underwent an intensive three-year training after finishing secondary school and worked as a substitute for doctors and were even called "madaktari" - doctors - in Kiswahili (Swahili).

Godfrey's mother Syabumi Mwakikagile (née Mwambapa) who came from Kyimbila in Rungwe District was a pupil of Tanganyika's British feminist educator, and later Member of Parliament, Mary Hancock, who taught her at Kyimbila Girls' School in the Southern Highlands Province in the early 1940s. Mary Hancock was a friend of Nyerere and his family since 1953 and supported him during the struggle for independence. She was also the founder of Kyimbila Girls' School near the town of Tukuyu and of Loleza Girls' School in the town of Mbeya, capital of the Southern Highlands Province. Loleza Girls' School had its origin in Kyimbila Girls' School.

The eldest of his siblings, Mwakikagile was named Godfrey by his aunt Isabella, one of his father's younger sisters, and was baptised at an Anglican CMS church – Church Missionary Society – in Kigoma by Reverend Frank McGorlick from Victoria, Australia, on Christmas day, 1949. Godfrey's baptismal middle name is Seth. He was named Seth by his paternal great uncle Amos Mwaibanje, elder brother of his grandmother Laheli Kasuka Mwaibanje. He was brought up as a member of Kyimbila Moravian Church whose pastor was his maternal great uncle, Asegelile Mwankemwa, younger brother of his grandmother and the first African pastor of the church. His mother Syabumi Mwambapa was born at the residence of her uncle Aseglile Mwankemwa where her mother went to live with her younger brother after her husband Mwambapa – his other family name Mwasomola – originally from Mwakaleli died in 1929 and spent some of her early years there with her mother and her cousins, the children of her uncle. The surname of her five male cousins, the children of Mwankemwa, was Mwaiseje. They had four sisters. Her mother Tungapesyaga Mapunga (Mwamapunga), Godfrey's maternal grandmother, was also buried there on the property of her younger brother Asegelile Mwankemwa when she died in 1943, according to Godfrey Mwakikagile in his books Life under British Colonial Rule, The African Liberation Struggle: Reflections, Africa in Transition: Witness to Change, and in a review of his works in “Godfrey Mwakikagile: Eurocentric Africanist?”

Syabumi named her son Willie soon after he was born, a prebaptismal name he does not officially use but by which he is known among his relatives and other people who knew him when he was growing up, as he has stated in his autobiographical writings and in other works including a book he wrote in 2023 about one of his secondary school teachers who was a national leader in Tanganyika's independence movement, Julius Mwasanyagi: A forgotten African nationalist.

His father played a critical role in his early life and education. He was a strict disciplinarian and taught him at home when he was attending primary school from Standard One to Standard Four and during the first two years of middle school, Standard Five and Standard Six, before he left home to go to boarding school in 1963, three miles away, when he was 13 years old. He also taught him when he was out of school and went home during holidays in his last two years of middle school in Standard Seven and Standard Eight. His mother, who taught Sunday school and was a volunteer adult education teacher for some time teaching adults how to read and write, also taught him at home when he was in primary school.

His father was active in the Tanganyika African National Union – TANU – which led the struggle for independence and was friends with some of the leading figures in the African independence movement. They included John Mwakangale, his classmate from Standard One at Tukuyu Primary School to Malangali Secondary School, where Elijah was appointed head prefect, in the Southern Highlands Province. They came from the same area, three miles apart, in Rungwe District and knew each other since childhood. Mwakangale became one of the prominent leaders of the Tanganyika African National Union and of the Pan-African Freedom Movement for East and Central Africa (PAFMECA), later renamed the Pan-African Freedom Movement for East, Central and Southern Africa (PAFMECSA), formed in Mwanza, Tanganyika, in September 1958 under the leadership of Julius Nyerere to campaign for the independence of the countries of East and Central Africa and later Southern Africa and which played a major role in the formation of the Organisation of African Unity almost five years later. He also became a Member of Parliament (MP) and a cabinet member in the early part of independence under Nyerere serving as Minister of Labour.

John Mwakangale was also the first leader Nelson Mandela met in newly independent Tanganyika in January 1962 – just one month after Tanganyika emerged from colonial rule – when Mandela secretly left South Africa on 11 January to seek assistance from other African countries in the struggle against apartheid and wrote about him in his autobiography Long Walk to Freedom. After Mandela crossed the border and entered Bechuanaland (renamed Botswana) on 11 January, he stayed there until 19 January when he flew to Mbeya, capital of the Southern Highlands Province in southwestern Tanganyika bordering Nyasaland (renamed Malawi) and Northern Rhodesia, now Zambia. He met with Mwakangale in Mbeya the next day on 20 January. He flew from Mbeya to Dar es Salaam on 21 January where he met with Nyerere on the same day.

Tanganyika was the first independent African country Mandela visited and the first one where he sought such assistance. It was also the first country in the region to win independence and the first one he visited, as Tanzania, when he was released from prison on 11 February 1990. He travelled to other African countries using a document given to him by the government of Tanganyika which stated: “This is Nelson Mandela, a citizen of the Republic of South Africa. He has permission to leave Tanganyika and return here.”

Tanganyika was chosen by African leaders to be the headquarters of all the liberation movements when they met in Addis Ababa, Ethiopia, in May 1963 to form the Organisation of African Unity (OAU).

Sam Nujoma, the leader of Namibia's liberation movement SWAPO who became the first president of Namibia after the country won independence, travelled on a Tanzanian passport (Number 173309) for security reasons as a citizen of Tanzania using John Mwakangale's last name as Sam Mwakangale. He was given the passport after he met John Mwakangale in 1969 when Mwakangale was Regional Commissioner of Dodoma where SWAPO had established its military training camps for its freedom fighters, authorised by President Nyerere. Other freedom fighters from the countries of southern Africa under white minority rule were also given Tanzanian passports without using their real names.

Also Kanyama Chiume, who became Malawi's first Minister of Foreign Affairs, stayed for some time at John Mwakangale's house in Mwakangale's home village of Makandana on the outskirts of Tukuyu during the struggle for Malawi's independence when the country was known as Nyasaland under British colonial rule. Chiume lived in Tanganyika since his childhood. He attended primary school and secondary school in Tanganyika and spoke Swahili fluently like a native speaker. He was a schoolmate and classmate of Rashidi Kawawa who became prime minister of Tanganyika and later vice president of Tanzania.

Professor John Iliffe in his book, A Modern History of Tanganyika, described John Mwakangale as a "vehement nationalist."

Mwakangale was also described as the most "anti-white" and "anti-British" member of the government and was very defensive of the interests of African workers.

He did not even want American Peace Corps in Tanzania. In his book Reflections on Race Relations: A Personal Odyssey, Godfrey Mwakikagile wrote that John Mwakangale accused American Peace Corps of causing trouble, including attempting to overthrow the government, and bluntly stated: “These people are not here for peace, they are here for trouble. We do not want any more Peace Corps”, according to a report, "M.P. Attacks American Peace Corps," which was the main story on the front page of the Tanganyika Standard, 12 June 1964.

Other colleagues of Elijah Mwakikagile were Austin Shaba, his co-worker as a medical assistant and earlier his classmate at the Medical Training Centre (MTC) at Tanganyika's largest hospital in the capital Dar es Salaam later transformed into the country's first medical school who served as a Member of Parliament and cabinet member in the first independence cabinet— serving as Minister of Local Government and later as Minister of Health and Housing, and as Deputy Speaker of Parliament; Wilbard B.K. Mwanjisi, his classmate from Standard One at Tukuyu Primary School to Malangali Secondary School who became a doctor, prominent member of TANU and, before leaving government service, was president of the Tanganyika Government Servants Association, a national organisation for African government employees during colonial rule; Jeremiah Kasambala, Elijah Mwakikagile's classmate at Malangali Secondary School who became head of the Rungwe African Cooperative Union responsible for mobilising support from farmers to join the struggle for independence and who went on to become a cabinet member in the early years of independence—taking over the portfolio for Commerce and Cooperatives and later serving as Minister of Industries, Minerals and Energy; Johnston Kihampa, Minister of Lands, Housing and Urban Development in the late 1960s who also once served as headmaster of Mpuguso Middle School in Rungwe District Elijah's son Godfrey attended; Robert Kaswende - he and Elijah Mwakikagile knew each other since the early 1940s - who became police chief for Rungwe District in Tukuyu soon after independence and who was later appointed by President Nyerere as deputy head of the police for the whole country and thereafter head of the National Service which became a part of the Ministry of Defence renamed Ministry of Defence and National Service; and Brown Ngwilulupi, who became Secretary General of the Cooperative Union of Tanganyika (CUT), the largest farmers' union in the country, appointed by President Nyerere.

Their headmaster at Malangali Secondary School in the early 1940s was Ted Field, British. Their teachers included Julius Mganga, Juma Ali and Erasto Andrew Mbwana Mang'enya who later became a cabinet member under President Nyerere, Speaker of Parliament, and Tanzania's Permanent Representative to the United Nations. Mang'enya also taught at Moshi, Tanga, Tabora and Songea Secondary schools.

Brown Ngwilulupi, a member of TANU for decades, later left the ruling party and co-founded Tanzania's largest opposition party, Chadema, and served as its first vice-chairman under former Finance Minister and IMF's executive director Edwin Mtei during the same period when he was a relative-in-law of Tanzania's Vice President John Malecela who also served as Prime Minister at the same time under President Ali Hassan Mwinyi. Ngwilulupi's daughter was married to Malecela's son. Malecela was also the first African to serve as District Commissioner (D.C.) of Rungwe District in the town of Tukuyu soon after independence in the early 1960s when Elijah Mwakikagile was a member of the Rungwe District Council where he was a councillor for many years. The title of District Commissioner was changed to Area Commissioner in 1962. Brown Ngwilulupi also worked in Tukuyu during the same period with Jeremiah Kasambala at the Rungwe African Cooperative Union.

Ngwilulupi and Elijah Mwakikagile came from the same village in Kyimbila four miles south of the town of Tukuyu, knew each other since childhood, and were classmates from Standard One at Tukuyu Primary School to Malangali Secondary School. Both were beneficiaries of academic acceleration and skipped some standards - class years - because they excelled in school. They later became relatives-in-law when they married cousins. Their wives, who came from the same area they did, were first cousins to each other and grew up together in the same household of Asegelile Mwankemwa.

Elijah Mwakikagile was also a first cousin of one of Tanzania's first commercial airline pilots, Oscar Mwamwaja, who was shot but survived when he was a co-pilot of an Air Tanzania plane, a Boeing 737, that was hijacked on 26 February 1982 and forced to fly from Tanzania to Britain. Elijah's mother was an elder sister of Oscar's father Jotham Mwaibanje (also known as Mwamwaja, the other family name). Oscar's mother came from Arusha in northern Tanzania. He was born in Arusha and spent some of his early years in Arusha when his father worked in that town. In the late 1980s, Oscar became a flight instructor at a pilot training school in Zaria, northern Nigeria. He died in Zaria in 1991 and was buried there.

Elijah was also a first cousin of Absalom Mwaibanje, a senior officer in Tanzania's intelligence service since the early years of Tanganyika's independence whose father, Simon Eliakim Mwaibanje, was a younger brother of Elijah's mother. Simon supported his nephew Elijah and paid for his education from Tukuyu Primary School to Malangali Secondary School. And Elijah's son Godfrey is a first cousin of Brigadier-General Owen Rhodfrey Mwambapa, a graduate of Sandhurst, a royal military academy in the United Kingdom, who was a senior military instructor and once head of the Tanzania Military Academy, an army officers' training school at Monduli in Arusha Region. One of his students was Paul Kagame who years later became president of Rwanda. Owen's father Johann Chonde Mwambapa was an elder brother of Godfrey's mother, the last-born in her family. He helped raise her after their parents died and even ruled against her getting married at the age of seventeen. He said she was too young to get married. He was ten years older than she was. She went to live with him after their parents died and helped to take care of her nephew Owen who was born when she was already living there.

She had four elder brothers and two sisters. One of her elder brothers, Benjamin Mwambapa who was the immediate younger brother of Owen's father, became head of the Criminal Investigation Department (CID) for Rungwe District soon after independence and worked at the police station in the town of Tukuyu with the district police chief Robert Kaswende, Elijah Mwakikagile's friend since the early 1940s. Earlier, Benjamin Mwambapa worked for E. Norman Brend, head of the Special Branch, an intelligence unit, for Lake Province at the police station in the provincial capital Mwanza during colonial rule. Brend was later transferred to Mbeya, the capital of the Southern Highlands Province since 1936. Before then, Iringa was the capital of the Southern Highlands Province from 1926. Brend, who moved to Mbeya with Benjamin Mwambapa, played a major role in helping Mwambapa become head of the CID for Rungwe District.

Benjamin Mwambapa also worked at the same police station in Mwanza with Peter Bwimbo who, after independence, became head of the Presidential Protection Unit and President Nyerere's Chief Bodyguard. They worked in the same department. Bwimbo later served as assistant director of the Tanzania Intelligence and Security Service (TISS). He also wrote about Benjamin Mwambapa in his book, Mlinzi Mkuu wa Mwalimu Nyerere (Chief Bodyguard of Mwalimu Nyerere), on the years they worked together at the police station in Mwanza since 1953. He stated that when he arrived at Mwanza police station on 1 April 1953 after being transferred from Dar es Salaam, Benjamin had already been working for E.N. Brend for a long time. It was an experience that later facilitated his appointment as head of the Criminal Investigation Department (CID) for Rungwe District soon afer independence. Bwimbo also stated in his book that the police officers called Brend Bwana Mtemba in Swahili which means Mister Pipe because he smoked a pipe but did not know they called him that.

Coincidentally, Peter Bwimbo's younger brother Patrick Bwimbo was a classmate of Godfrey Mwakikagile at Tambaza High School in Dar es Salaam; so was George Mazula, one of Tanzania's first commercial airline pilots, and Mohamed Chande Othman who became Chief Justice of Tanzania. President Nyerere's first-born child, Andrew Nyerere, was also their schoolmate. They all stayed together at the school's student hostel.

=== Education and early employment ===
Godfrey Mwakikagile attended Kyimbila Primary School - founded by British feminist educator Mary Hancock and transformed into a co-educational institution - near the town of Tukuyu in the late 1950s. He also attended Mpuguso Middle School in Rungwe District, Mbeya Region, in the Southern Highlands Province. The headmaster of Mpuguso Middle School, Moses Mwakibete, was his math teacher in Standard Five in 1961. Mwakibete later became a judge at the High Court of Tanzania appointed by President Nyerere.

Moses's brother Richard Mwakibete later became headmaster of Mpuguso Middle School when Godfrey was still a student there, followed by another headmaster, Geoffrey Sawaya, who became Tanzania's Director of the Criminal Investigation Department (CID). As CID Director, Sawaya testified in the treason trial of 1970 against two former cabinet members and two senior army officers who were among those convicted for attempting to overthrow President Nyerere. The coup attempt was masterminded by Tanzania's former Minister of Defence and External Affairs, Oscar Kambona, who was living in exile in Britain.

One of Godfrey Mwakikagile's American Peace Corps teachers at Mpuguso Middle School in Standard Eight in 1964 was Leonard Levitt who became a prominent journalist and renowned author. He wrote, among other works, An African Season, the first book ever written by a member of the Peace Corps, and Conviction: Solving the Moxley Murder, about a homicide which received extensive media coverage because it involved a member of the Kennedy family.

Mwakikagile also attended Songea Secondary School from 1965 to 1968 in Ruvuma Region which was once a part of the Southern Province. His current affairs teacher at Songea Secondary School, Julius Mwasanyagi, was one of the early members and leaders of TANU (Tanganyika African National Union) who played a major role in the struggle for independence and worked closely with Nyerere. He was one of the major participants at the Tabora Conference of 1958 when the role of TANU was debated on how the party would carry on the independence struggle as a nationalist movement without compromising the interests of the black African majority.

He fell out of favour with Nyerere in the mid-1960s and spent the rest of his life in relative obscurity as a secondary school teacher, almost forgotten as one of the earliest and most prominent nationalists who, together with Nyerere, Oscar Kambona, Abdullah Kassim Hanga and Bibi Titi Mohammed, was one of the first proponents and supporters of the unification of Tanganyika and Zanzibar, even before the Zanzibar Revolution, which led to the creation of Tanzania as a union of two independent countries.

A native of Iringa District in the Southern Highlands Province, Mwasanyagi was one of the most vocal nationalists of his time who also, in the 1950s, wrote and sent petitions to the United Nations opposing the government's land policy which involved land grabs and other colonial injustices during British rule which affected the well-being of the indigenous people. He stated in one of his petitions to the United Nations that one day the people, subjected to land dispossession, will find out that their fertile land was declared White Highlands for white settlers as happened in neighbouring Kenya where the Kikuyu lost their land in the Central Highlands to the British settlers, triggering the Mau Mau rebellion - war of independence. A graduate of Makerere University he was a classmate of Nyerere at Makerere.

He articulated positions which thrust him into prominence as one of the national leaders and not just of the Hehe people (Wahehe) in Iringa District in the Southern Highlands Province during the struggle for independence. As a Pan-Africanist, he greatly admired Kwame Nkrumah and Julius Nyerere as leaders of continental stature despite his sharp differences with Nyerere on what route Tanzania should take in pursuit and consolidation of democracy. It is a subject one of his students, Godfrey Mwakikagile, has briefly addressed in his book Nyerere and Africa: End of an Era (2002, 2010). Mwasanyagi has drawn the interest of some scholars in and outside Tanzania because of his important role in the struggle for independence and in the quest for democracy, among them, Professor James L. Giblin of the University of Iowa, whose primary research focuses on Tanzania and East Africa. Godfrey Mwakikagile has also addressed the subject in his book Julius Mwasanyagi: A forgotten African nationalist (2023).

Mwakikagile's headmaster at Songea Secondary School, Paul Mhaiki, also played a national role when he was later appointed by President Nyerere as Director of Adult Education at the Ministry of National Education and after that worked for the United Nations (UN) as Director of UNESCO's Division of Literacy, Adult Education, and Rural Development. He later served as Tanzania's ambassador to France. After finishing his studies at Songea Secondary School in Form IV (Standard 12) in 1968, Mwakikagile went to Tambaza High School in 1969 in Dar es Salaam, formerly H.H. The Aga Khan High School mostly for Asian students (Indian and Pakistani), where he completed Form VI (Standard 14) in 1970. One of his classmates at Tambaza High School, Mohamed Chande Othman, simply known as Chande, became the seventh Chief Justice of Tanzania since independence appointed to the nation's highest court by President Jakaya Kikwete after serving as a high court judge and as a UN prosecutor for international criminal tribunals.

While still in high school at Tambaza, Mwakikagile joined the editorial staff of The Standard (later renamed the Daily News) in 1969 as a reporter. He was hired by the news editor, David Martin, a British journalist who later became Africa correspondent of a London newspaper, The Observer, the world's oldest Sunday paper, covered the Angolan Civil War for BBC and for CBC (Canadian Broadcasting Corporation) and was a close friend of President Nyerere. Mwakikagile credits David Martin for opening the door for him into the world of journalism and helping him launch his career as a news reporter when he was still a high school student. In addition to his position as news editor, David Martin also served as deputy managing editor of the Tanganyika Standard under Brendon Grimshaw. Founded in 1930, The Standard was the oldest and largest English newspaper in the country and one of the three largest in East Africa, a region comprising Kenya, Uganda and Tanzania.

After finishing high school in November 1970, Mwakikagile joined the National Service in January 1971 which was mandatory for all those who had completed secondary school, high school and college or university studies. He underwent training, which included basic military training, at Ruvu National Service camp when it was headed by his former primary school teacher Eslie Mwakyambiki who later became a Member of Parliament (MP) representing Rungwe District and Deputy Minister of Defence and National Service under President Nyerere. Mwakikagile then went to another National Service camp in Bukoba on the shores of Lake Victoria in the North-West Region bordering Uganda.

After leaving National Service, Mwakikagile returned to the Daily News. His editor then was Sammy Mdee who later served as President Nyerere's press secretary and as Tanzania's deputy ambassador to the United Nations and as ambassador to France and Portugal, and then Benjamin Mkapa who helped him to further his studies in the United States. Years later, Mkapa became President of Tanzania after serving as President Nyerere's press secretary, Minister of Foreign Affairs and as ambassador to Nigeria, Canada and the United States among other cabinet and ambassadorial posts. He was a student of Nyerere in secondary school at St. Francis College, Pugu, on the outskirts of Dar es Salaam, and president of Tanzania for 10 years, serving two consecutive five-year terms.

Mwakikagile also worked as an information officer at the Ministry of Information and Broadcasting in Dar es Salaam. He left Tanzania in November 1972 to go for further studies in the United States when he was a reporter at the Daily News under Mkapa. He has stated in some of his writings including Nyerere and Africa: End of an Era that without Mkapa, he may never have gone to school in the United States where he became an author and an Africanist focusing on post-colonial studies. He also credits Mkapa for helping him achieve his goal as an author because of the role he played in sending him to the United States where he got the opportunity to write books. Mkapa was also a close friend of David Martin.

One of Mwakikagile's main books in post-colonial studies is The Modern African State: Quest for Transformation (Nova Science Publishers, Inc., Huntington, New York, 2001). Professor Guy Martin, in his book African Political Thought (Palgrave Macmillan, 2012) in which he examines the political thought of leading African political thinkers throughout history dating back to ancient times (Kush/Nubia, sixth century BCE), has described Mwakikagile as one of Africa's leading populist scholars and political thinkers and theorists and has used his book The Modern African State to examine his ideas. Professor Edmond J. Keller, Chairman of the Political Science Department at the University of California-Los Angeles (UCLA), in his review of Professor Martin's African Political Thought in Africa Today, Volume 60, Number 2, Winter 2013, Indiana University Press, has described Mwakikagile as a public intellectual and an academic theorist. Other major African political thinkers and theorists covered by Professor Guy Martin in his book include Julius Nyerere, Kwame Nkrumah, Leopold Sédar Senghor, Amilcar Cabral, Cheikh Anta Diop, and Steve Biko.

Professor Ryan Ronnenberg in his article about Godfrey Mwakikagile in the Dictionary of African Biography, Volume 6 (Oxford University Press, 2011) covering the lives and legacies of notable African men and women since ancient times, edited by Harvard University professors, Emmanuel K. Akyeampong and Henry Louis Gates Jr., has stated that Mwakikagile has written major works of scholarship which have had a great impact in the area of African studies.

Some of Mwakikagile's most influential books in post-colonial studies include Africa and the West, reviewed by West Africa magazine and other publications including Sierra Leone's ExpoTimes, and Africa After Independence: Realities of Nationhood. Professor Ronnenberg has used both books and others including Economic Development in Africa and Africa is in a Mess: What Went Wrong and What Should Be Done by Mwakikagile in his article about him in the Dictionary of African Biography to explain his ideas and influence.

Professor George Ayittey has described Godfrey Mwakikagile as one of Africa's leading “Cheetahs,” a term he has used in his lectures and writings to describe Africans, especially of the younger generation and sometimes older ones, who offer from a different perspective innovative solutions for fundamental change to transform Africa into a prosperous continent contrasted with what has been proposed and pursued by African leaders since independence, as Mwakikagile has shown in Africa is in a Mess and in his other books on post-colonial Africa. Anna Mahjar Barducci, like Ayittey, has described Mwakikagile in similar terms in her work, “Aiutiamoli A Casa Loro? Lo Stiamo Già Facendo, Ma Male” (“Let's Help Them at Home? We Are Already Doing It, But Badly”).

Mwakikagile has through the years focused on the failure of African leaders and governments to address the continent's problems, abusing their power, misusing and squandering resources which could have been used to improve living conditions of their people and develop the continent which does not even need foreign aid because of its vast amounts of natural resources. In his book The Fear and The Freedom: How the Second World War Changed Us, British historian and best-selling author Keith Lowe wrote the following about Mwakikagile:

“In 2006 the Tanzanian intellectual Godfrey Mwakikagile wrote despairingly about how some Africans, disillusioned by years of poverty, violence and corruption, had begun to look back on their colonial past with a kind of warped nostalgia.”

Mwakikagile places the blame squarely on the shoulders of African leaders. He also blames them for the massive brain drain Africa has suffered through the years since independence, with tens of thousands of highly educated people and professionals – critical to Africa's development – leaving the continent every year, a phenomenon that has become one of the defining features of Africa in the post-colonial era.

He contends that bad leadership is the biggest problem African countries have faced since independence because leaders are not held accountable for their actions and rig elections to stay in power and even perpetuate themselves in office, a problem he has addressed in his books including Ethnicity and Regionalism in National Politics in Kenya and Nigeria: A Comparative Study (2024).

In another one of his books, The Sixties in Africa and The United States: A Decade of Transformation published in 2026, Mwakikagile has also addressed the challenges African countries faced during the Cold War, an ideological rivalry between the East ad the West which had a direct impact on the emerging nations and partly determined the course they took in their quest for consolidation of their independence including the kind of institutions they attempted to build at the expense of democracy. It is complemented by another one of his works The Turbulent Decade (2026).

He further contends that power in African countries is too centralised, concentrated at the centre, ostensibly to maintain unity and stability while the real intention is to deny people freedom and suffocate dissent. Leaders think they are the only people who know what is best for their countries. Most African countries are de facto one-party states even in this era of multi-party democracy, making it impossible for the people to harness their full potential to participate in the conduct of national affairs and development of their countries. He maintains that denial of democratic rights and suppression of dissent has plunged a number of African countries into chaos through the years, including those once considered to be islands of stability on a turbulent continent.

His books are mostly found in college and university libraries throughout the world. They are also found in public libraries. They are mostly academic books primarily for scholars.

Mwakikagile's works in post-colonial studies have been cited in other contexts besides academic fields. The premier of Western Cape Province in South Africa, Helen Zille, in her speech in the provincial parliament on 28 March 2017, cited Godfrey Mwakikagile's analysis of the impact of colonial rule on Africa in defence of her Tweets which her critics said were a defence of colonialism and even called for her resignation. She said her analysis was the same as Mwakikagile's and those of other prominent people including Nelson Mandela, Chinua Achebe, Ali Mazrui, and former Indian prime minister, Manmohan Singh, stating that she made the same point they did. And South African Vice President Phumzile Mlambo-Ngcuka in her speech on African leadership and development at a conference of African leaders, diplomats and scholars at the University of the Western Cape in South Africa in September 2006 cited Mwakikagile from his book Nyerere and Africa: End of an Era to support her position on the subject.

In the United States, Mwakikagile served as president of the African Students Union whilst attending Wayne State University in Detroit, Michigan. He graduated from that university in 1975.

He was sponsored by the Pan-African Congress-USA, a Detroit-based African-American organisation founded by Arthur Smith (Kwame Atta), who was a close friend of Malcolm X, and Edward Vaughn, a political activist and national civil rights leader who served as executive assistant to Detroit's first black mayor Coleman Young and as a state representative of Detroit in the Michigan State Legislature and later as president of the NAACP for the state of Alabama, as Mwakikagile has explained in his writings including Reflections on Race Relations: A Personal Odyssey.

Edward Vaughn, simply known as Ed Vaughn, was, together with C.L.R. James and Amiri Baraka, one of the leading African American delegates to the Sixth Pan-African Congress held at the University of Dar es Salaam in Tanzania in June 1974 that was chaired by President Nyerere. It was the first of its kind to be held on African soil. The last one, the Fifth Pan-African Congress, was held in Manchester, England, in October 1945 and was attended by future African leaders Kwame Nkrumah, Jomo Kenyatta and Hastings Kamuzu Banda who became the first presidents of their countries on attainment of independence.

The Pan-African Congress-USA was formed to establish ties with African countries – some of its members went to live and work in Africa including Tanzania – and supported liberation movements in the countries of southern Africa in their struggle against white minority rule. It was inspired by and followed the teachings and writings of Kwame Nkrumah, Julius Nyerere, Ahmed Sékou Touré, Marcus Garvey, and Malcolm X. These were also the only leaders whose portraits were on the wall of the conference hall of the Pan-African Congress-USA. Pan-African Congress leaders and other members also wore Nyerere suit worn by President Nyerere and other Tanzanian leaders, as did Amiri Baraka, formerly LeRoi Jones, who also greatly admired Nyerere and was a Pan-Africanist close ally of Ed Vaughn.

Nyerere was greatly admired and highly respected not just for his statesmanship and Pan-Africanist credentials but for other qualities as well. As Dr. Matt Meyer, an academic and the Africa Support Network Coordinator for the War Resisters, stated in “Revolutionary Nonviolence: Statecraft Lessons from the Global South," Tikkun, Volume 30, Issue 3, Duke University Press, Summer 2015:

“Tanzanian intellectual Godfrey Mwakikagile, author of numerous works on contemporary statecraft, noted that Nyerere led with 'extraordinary intelligence.'”

President Jimmy Carter described Nyerere as "a world leader" not just an African leader, and as "a scholar" and "a philosopher." His scholarly accomplishments included translating Shakespeare's Julius Caesar and The Merchant of Venice into Swahili. He also translated Plato's magnum opus, The Republic, into Swahili, considered to be his last major literary work before he died in 1999. Professor Issa Shivji said Nyerere revealed to them at a conference in Dar es Salaam commemorating his 75th birthday that he had finished translating Plato's work into Swahili.

He strongly promoted the use of Kiswahili (Swahili) as a unifying language in Tanzania and, by extension, in East Africa, more than any other leader did.

Professor Ali Mazrui stated that Nyerere was "the most intellectual African leader" and "the most original thinker" among all African leaders and "the most enterprising of African political philosophers. He has philosophized extensively in both English and Kiswahili." He also stated, "The most intellectual of East Africa's Heads of State at the time was Julius K. Nyerere of Tanzania, a true philosopher, president and original thinker....Julius K. Nyerere was in a class by himself in the combination of ethical standards and intellectual power. In the combination of high thinking and high ethics, no other East African politician was in the same league." Mazrui also stated in The Gambia Echo, 25 July 2008: "Intellectually, I had higher regard for Julius K. Nyerere of Tanzania than most politicians anywhere in the world."

His global stature as a towering figure was expressed by Mazrui in these terms in "Nyerere and I" in the Daily Nation, Nairobi, Kenya, 26 December 1999:

"He was one of the giants of the 20th century. He did bestride this narrow world like an African colossus. Julius Nyerere was my Mwalimu (Teacher) too. It was a privilege to learn so much from so great a man."

His professors and fellow students at the University of Edinburgh remembered him well. His humility and simplicity belied his intellect. As Trevor Grundy stated in " Julius Nyerere Reconsidered," 4 May 2015:

"He had a formidable intellect and a blotting paper brain. Statesmen and journalists were amazed at his knowledge. Hardly a soul at Edinburgh guessed he would turn into Africa's number one brain box in years to come. As the historian George Shepperson put it in a BBC interview: 'We at Edinburgh were very surprised in the mid-1950s when Dr Nyerere's name became widespread throughout the world press. We never felt when he was here that he was going to become a leading politician.' The Rhodesian leader Ian Smith several times referred to Nyerere as Africa's 'evil genius.'"

The United States Secretary of State Henry Kissinger saw Nyerere and Léopold Sédar Senghor as the two most intellectual African presidents – so did Ali Mazrui – with profound visions for Africa, as he stated in his book Henry Kissinger: Years of Renewal:

"The two most impressive leaders I encountered on this trip, Nyerere and Senghor, were at opposite ends of the African spectrum. In a sense, they represented metaphors for varying approaches to African identity.

Nyerere considered himself as a leader of an Africa that should evolve in a unique way, separate from the currents in the rest of the world which Africa would use without permitting them to contaminate its essence. Senghor saw himself as a participant in an international order in which Africa and négritude would play a significant, but not isolated, role.

When all is said and done, Nyerere strove for the victory of black Africa while Senghor sought a reconciliation of cultures within the context of self-determination."

Jonathan Power, an internationally renowned British journalist and columnist for decades who lived and worked in Tanzania for a number of years and who was critical of Nyerere's socialist policies and one-party system, stated in his article "Lament for Independent Africa's Greatest Leader", TFF Jonathan Power Columns, London, 6 October 1999:

"Tanzania in East Africa has long been one of the 25 poorest countries in the world. But there was a time when it was described, in terms of its political influence, as one of the top 25. It punched far above its weight. That formidable achievement was the work of one man (Julius Nyerere), now lying close to death in a London hospital.

The American ambassador to Tanzania, Richard N. Viets, said this about Nyerere in an interview with The Association for Diplomatic Studies and Training (ADST), Foreign Affairs Oral History Project, in April 1990:

“He was a superb politician. He had an acute brain, the memory of an elephant, intellectual horsepower that was second to none.”

Robert Hennemeyer, who was the deputy American ambassador to Tanganyika, later Tanzania, from 1961 to 1964, described Nyerere in the following terms in an interview with ADST in February 1989:

Nyerere's stature and influence in a global context is one of the subjects Mwakikagile has addressed in his books, among them, Tanzania under Mwalimu Nyerere: Reflections on an African Statesman and The Union of Tanganyika and Zanzibar: Formation of Tanzania and its Challenges.

He was also incorruptible. As Roger Mann stated in his report in The Washington Post, 4 August 1977:

"He is also a man of irrepressible intellect....Nyerere is personally considered to be above reproach. A wealthy Nairobi-based Greek businesswoman, whose family has been involved in Tanzania for two generations, says 'Nyerere is the only man in East Africa who cannot be bought.' A practicing Roman Catholic of simple tastes, the 55-year-old philosopher president is said to be the lowest paid head of state in Africa."

And When he died, Newsweek, although critical of his policies of socialism and one-party rule, stated in "A Man of Principle," October 24, 1999: "The world lost a man of principle."

His principled stand was a great inspiration to the Pan-African Congress-USA which sponsored Mwakikagile.

The main leader of the Pan-African Congress-USA, Edward Vaughn, also known as Mwalimu like President Nyerere, met with Nyerere when he was one of the leading African American delegates to the Sixth-Pan-African Congress held in Dar es Saalam in June 1974. Vaughn's work and influence as a civil rights leader and as a Pan-Africanist is the subject of Mwakikagile's book Ed Vaughn: Remembering an icon (2024).

Pan-African Congress members also learned and taught Swahili. The organisation also had a scholarship programme to sponsor students from Africa to study in Detroit. The director of the scholarship programme, Malikia Wada Lumumba (Rosemary Jones), was a professor of psychology. Besides Tanzania, other students came from Ghana, Sierra Leone, Nigeria and Gambia.

Godfrey Mwakikagile was the first student from Tanzania to be sponsored by the organisation. His colleague at the Daily News in Tanzania, Deo Michael Masakilija, where both worked as reporters, was also sponsored by the Pan-African Congress-USA. Mwakikagile was also one of two students among those sponsored who became authors. The other one was Amadou S.O. Taal from Gambia, who became an economist under President Dawda Jawara and later served concurrently as Gambia's ambassador to Nigeria, Ghana, Angola, Chad, Rwanda and seven other African countries, and the Economic Community of West African States (ECOWAS). He and Mwakikagile planned to write a book together on NEPAD – New Partnership for Africa's Development – as Mwakikagile stated in his writings, including Nyerere and Africa: End of an Era and Africa is in a Mess: What Went Wrong and What Should Be Done. They were schoolmates and roommates when they attended Wayne State University from the early to the mid-seventies.

After completing his studies at Wayne State University, Mwakikagile went to Aquinas College in Grand Rapids, Michigan, in 1976. One of his professors of economics and head of the economics department at Aquinas College was Kenneth Marin, who once worked as an economic advisor to the government of Tanzania in Dar es Salaam on capital mobilisation and utilisation from the late 1960s to the early 1970s. He went to the same Catholic church President Nyerere did in Oyster Bay, Dar es Salaam. Before he went to Tanzania, Professor Marin was a member of the White House Consumer Advisory Council, where he served on wage and price control in the mid-1960s, appointed by President Lyndon B. Johnson.

He read Nyerere's writings to his students in economics classes at Aquinas College and said about Nyerere, "He is one of the best world leaders we have today," as Mwakikagile has stated in some of his books including Reflections on Race Relations: A Personal Odyssey. Coincidentally, Mwakikagile's first book was also about economics.

Mwakikagile also taught Swahili at Grand Rapids South High School in the late seventies. The school's most famous student years earlier was Gerald R. Ford, a native of Grand Rapids, who later became vice president and then president of the United States.

Mwakikagile also composed some instrumental music in 1993—self-taught - but did not release it until thirty years later, as he has briefly explained in one of his books, Julius Mwasanyagi: A forgotten African nationalist, in which he also states that he pursued it only as a hobby during that time and has, instead, focused on writing books through the years.

== Books ==
Mwakikagile's first book, Economic Development in Africa, was published in June 1999. He has written many books that are mostly about Africa during the post-colonial era.

His books are used in various academic disciplines up to the post-graduate level including doctoral studies. He has also written some books about the African diaspora, mainly Black America and the Afro-Caribbean region including Afro-Caribbean communities in Britain and the United States. His works on race relations include Shattered Dream: Race and Justice, Patrick Lyoya killed by the police: What did I do wrong?, Across The Colour Line in an American City, On the Banks of a River, In the Crucible of Identity and Reflections on Race Relations: A Personal Odyssey which is a comparative analysis between colonial Tanganyika and the United States in terms of race relations that also focuses on problems in race relations in the American context in contemporary times.

Other books he has written on race relations include Tragic Destiny (2025), The Sixties in Africa and The United States: A Decade of Transformation (2026), and The Turbulent Decade: Africa and The United States, (2026).

On Mwakikagile's writings on Afro-Caribbeans and their connection to Africa, Professor Erin C. MacLeod states in her book, Visions of Zion: Ethiopians and Rastafari in the Search for the Promised Land, New York University Press, 2014: “Tanzanian scholar Godfrey Mwakikagile postulates that the Rastafari connection with Ethiopia constitutes a denial of origins in West Africa and is a 'reflection of an inferiority complex on their part, refusing to identify themselves with typical ''Black—'Negro'—Africa and is a delusion and distortion of history and reality."

=== Nyerere and Africa: End of an Era ===
His book Nyerere and Africa: End of an Era, was published not long after Nyerere died and established him as one of Nyerere's prominent biographers.[11]. Professor David Simon, a specialist in development studies at the University of London and Director of the Centre for Development Areas Research at Royal Holloway College, published in 2005 excerpts from the book in his compiled study, Fifty Key Thinkers on Development. Professor Simon was, during that time and thereafter, also the editor of the scholarly Journal of Southern African Studies and was on the editorial staff of another academic publication, the Review of African Political Economy.[12] Mwakikagile's book Nyerere and Africa was also reviewed by West Africa magazine in 2002.[13] It was also reviewed by a prominent Tanzanian journalist and political analyst, Fumbuka Ng'wanakilala of the Daily News, Dar es Salaam, in October 2002, and is seen as a comprehensive work, in scope and depth, on Nyerere.[14] The same book was also reviewed by Professor Roger Southall of the University of the Witwatersrand (Wits), formerly of Rhodes University, South Africa, in the bi-annual interdisciplinary publication, the Journal of Contemporary African Studies (Taylor & Francis Group), 22, No. 3, in 2004. Professor Southall was also the editor of the journal during that period.

Others who reviewed the book include Professor A.B. Assensoh, a Ghanaian teaching at Indiana University in Bloomington, Indiana, in the United States. He reviewed the first edition of Nyerere and Africa: End of an Era in the African Studies Review, an academic journal of the African Studies Association, in 2003.

== Controversy ==
Mwakikagile has been criticised, along with some African and European scholars including Professor Ali Mazrui, Christoph Blocher, Mahmood Mamdani, Peter Niggli, and R. W. Johnson, as someone who advocates the recolonisation of Africa through supervision of failed states by the African Union and the United Nations.

== Academic reviews ==
Mwakikagile's books have been reviewed in a number of academic publications, including the academic journal African Studies Review, by scholars in their fields. They include Military Coups in West Africa Since The Sixties, which was reviewed in that journal by Professor Claude E. Welch of the Department of Political Science at the State University of New York, Buffalo; and Ethnic Politics in Kenya and Nigeria, reviewed by Nigerian Professor Khadijat K. Rashid of Gallaudet University, Washington, D.C.

Other books by Mwakikagile have also been reviewed in the African Studies Review and in the Journal of Contemporary African Studies, including Nyerere and Africa: End of an Era and The Modern African State: Quest for Transformation which were reviewed in the African Studies Review. Nyerere and Africa was also reviewed in the Journal of Contemporary African Studies.

His book, Western Involvement in Nkrumah's Downfall, was reviewed by Professor E. Ofori Bekoe, in Africa Today, Vol. 64, Number 4, Summer 2016, Indiana University Press.

Mwakikagile has also written about race relations in the United States and relations between continental Africans and people of African descent in the diaspora in his titles such as Black Conservatives in The United States; Relations Between Africans and African Americans; and Relations Between Africans, African Americans and Afro-Caribbeans. Professor Kwame Essien of Gettysburg College, later Lehigh University, a Ghanaian, reviewed Relations Between Africans and African Americans: Misconceptions, Myths and Realities, in Souls: A Critical Journal of Black Politics, Culture, and Society, Volume 13, Issue 2, 2011, an academic journal of Columbia University, New York, and described it as an "insightful and voluminous" work covering a wide range of subjects from a historical and contemporary perspective, addressing some of the most controversial issues in relations between the two.

== Selected bibliography ==
- Economic Development in Africa, ISBN 978-1560727088, Huntington, New York: Nova Science Publishers, Inc. June 1999
- Africa and The West, ISBN 978-1560728405, Huntington, New York: Nova Science Publishers, Inc. 2000
- The Modern African State: Quest for Transformation, ISBN 9781560729365, Huntington, New York: Nova Science Publishers, Inc., 2001
- Military Coups in West Africa Since The Sixties, ISBN 9781560729457, Huntington, New York: Nova Science Publishers, Inc., 2001
- Ethnic Politics in Kenya and Nigeria, ISBN 978-1560729679, Huntington, New York: Nova Science Publishers, Inc. 2001
- Nyerere and Africa: End of an Era, ISBN 9781931768740, Protea Publishing Co., Atlanta, Georgia, USA, 2002
- Africa is in A Mess: What Went Wrong and What Should Be Done (2004), ISBN 0980253470, Dar es Salaam, Tanzania: New Africa Press, 2006
- Tanzania under Mwalimu Nyerere: Reflections on an African Statesman, ISBN 978-0980253498, 2006
- Black Conservatives: Are They Right or Wrong?, ISBN 978-1596820036, 2004
- Nyerere and Africa: End of an Era: Expanded Edition with Photos, ISBN 9781593440954, 2005
- Relations Between Africans and African Americans: Misconceptions, Myths and Realities, ISBN 9780980253450, 2007
- Life in Tanganyika in The Fifties: My Reflections and Narratives from The White Settler Community and Others, ISBN 9780620359818, 2006
- Life in Tanganyika in The Fifties, ISBN 978-9987160129, 2009
- African Countries: An Introduction, ISBN 0-620-34815-1, Continental Press, Johannesburg, South Africa, 2006
- African Countries: An Introduction, ISBN 978-0620348157, 2009
- Africa After Independence: Realities of Nationhood, ISBN 9789987160143, Dar es Salaam, Tanzania: New Africa Press, 2006
- Life under Nyerere, ISBN 978-0980258721, 2006
- Black Conservatives in The United States, ISBN 978-0980258707, 2006
- Africa and America in The Sixties: A Decade That Changed The Nation and The Destiny of A Continent, ISBN 978-0980253429, 2006
- Relations Between Africans, African Americans and Afro-Caribbeans: Tensions, Indifference and Harmony, ISBN 978-0980258745, 2007
- Investment Opportunities and Private Sector Growth in Africa, ISBN 978-0980258776, 2007
- Kenya: Identity of A Nation, ISBN 978-0980258790, 2007
- South Africa in Contemporary Times, ISBN 978-0980258738, 2008
- South Africa and Its People, ISBN 978-0981425832, 2008
- African Immigrants in South Africa, ISBN 978-0981425825, 2008
- The Union of Tanganyika and Zanzibar: Product of The Cold War?, ISBN 978-0981425856, 2008
- Ethnicity and National Identity in Uganda: The Land and Its People, ISBN 978-9987930876, 2009
- My Life as an African: Autobiographical Writings, ISBN 978-9987160051, 2009
- Uganda: The Land and Its People,ISBN 978-9987930890, 2009
- Botswana Since Independence, ISBN 978-0980258783, 2009
- Congo in The Sixties, ISBN 978-1448665709, 2009
- A Profile of African Countries, ISBN 978-9987160167, 2009
- Africans and African Americans: Complex Relations – Prospects and Challenges,ISBN 978-9987930852, 2009
- Africa 1960 – 1970: Chronicle and Analysis, ISBN 9789987160075, Dar es Salaam, Tanzania: New Africa Press, 2009
- Nyerere and Africa: End of an Era, 5th Edition, ISBN 0980253411, Pretoria, South Africa: New Africa Press, 2010
- Zambia: Life in an African Country, ISBN 978-9987160112, 2010
- Belize and Its Identity: A Multicultural Perspective, ISBN 978-9987160204, 2010
- Ethnic Diversity and Integration in The Gambia: The Land, The People and The Culture, ISBN 978-9987932221, 2010
- Zambia: The Land and Its People, ISBN 978-9987932252, 2010
- Belize and Its People: Life in A Multicultural Society, ISBN 978-9987932214, 2010
- The Gambia and Its People: Ethnic Identities and Cultural Integration in Africa, ISBN 978-9987160235, 2010
- South Africa as a Multi-Ethnic Society, ISBN 978-9987932238, 2010
- Life in Kenya: The Land and The People, Modern and Traditional Ways, ISBN 978-9987932276, 2010
- Botswana: Profile of A Nation, ISBN 978-9987932290, 2010
- Uganda: Cultures and Customs and National Identity,ISBN 978-9987160273, 2011
- Burundi: The Hutu and The Tutsi: Cauldron of Conflict and Quest for Dynamic Compromise, ISBN 978-9987160310, 2012
- Identity Politics and Ethnic Conflicts in Rwanda and Burundi: A Comparative Study, ISBN 978-9987160297, 2012
- The People of Uganda: A Social Perspective, ISBN 978-9987160334, 2012
- Uganda: A Nation in Transition: Post-colonial Analysis, ISBN 978-9987160358, 2012
- Obote to Museveni: Political Transformation in Uganda Since Independence, ISBN 978-9987160372, 2012
- Uganda Since The Seventies, ISBN 978-9987160228, 2012
- Civil Wars in Rwanda and Burundi: Conflict Resolution in Africa, ISBN 978-0981425849, 2013
- Peace and Stability in Rwanda and Burundi: The Road Not Taken, ISBN 978-9987160327, 2013
- Africa at the End of the Twentieth Century: What Lies Ahead, ISBN 978-9987160303, 2013
- Statecraft and Nation Building in Africa: A Post-colonial Study, ISBN 978-9987160396, 2014
- Africa in The Sixties, ISBN 978-9987160341, 2014
- Remembering The Sixties: A Look at Africa, ISBN 978-9987160365, 2014
- Restructuring The African State and Quest for Regional Integration: New Approaches, ISBN 978-9987160433, 2014
- Africa 1960 – 1970: Chronicle and Analysis, ISBN 978-9987160075, Revised Edition, 2014
- Post-colonial Africa: A General Study, ISBN 978-9987160419, 2014
- British Honduras to Belize: Transformation of a Nation, ISBN 978-9987160471, 2014
- Why Tanganyika united with Zanzibar to form Tanzania, ISBN 978-9987160457, 2014
- Congo in The Sixties, Revised Edition, ISBN 9789987160495, 2014
- The People of Kenya and Uganda, ISBN 978-9987160402, 2014
- Namibia: Conquest to Independence: Formation of a Nation, ISBN 978-9987160440, 2015
- Western Involvement in Nkrumah's Downfall, ISBN 978-9987160044, 2015
- Africa: Dawn of a New Era, ISBN 978-9987160488, 2015
- The Union of Tanganyika and Zanzibar: Formation of Tanzania and its Challenges, ISBN 978-9987160464, 2016
- The People of Ghana: Ethnic Diversity and National Unity, ISBN 978-9987160501, 2017
- Africa in Transition: Witness to Change, ISBN 978-9987160082, 2018
- The African Liberation Struggle: Reflections, ISBN 978-9987160105, 2018
- Life under British Colonial Rule: Recollections of an African and a British Administrator in Tanganyika and Southern Rhodesia, ISBN 978-9987160426, 2018
- Conquest of the Mind: Imperial subjugation of Africa, ISBN 978-9987997817, 2019
- Colonial Mentality and the Destiny of Africa, ISBN 978-9987997824, 2020
- Across The Colour Line in an American City, ISBN 979-8654395894, 2020
- On the Banks of a River, ISBN 979-8666516584, 2020
- In the Crucible o Identity, ISBN 979-8675721689, 2020
- Reflections on Race Relations: A Personal Odyssey, ISBN 978-9987997831, 2021
- Growing up in a Border District and Resolving the Tanzania-Malawi Lake Dispute: Compromise and concessions, ISBN 978-9987997848, 2022
- Patrick Lyoya killed by the police: What did I do wrong?, ISBN 978-9987997800, 2022
- The African Post-colonial State and its Challenges, ISBN 978-9912992603, 2022
- Shattered Dream: Race and Justice, ISBN 978-9912992627, 2023
- Julius Mwasanyagi: A forgotten African nationalist, ISBN 979-8852200389, 2023
- Militocracy vs. Democracy in West Africa 1960s – 1990s, ISBN 978-9912992634, 2023
- Ethnicity and Regionalism in National Politics in Kenya and Nigeria: A Comparative Study, ISBN 978-9912992696, 2024
- Ed Vaughn: Remembering an icon, ISBN 979-8302998613, 2024
- Tragic Destiny, ISBN 979-8294192730, 2025
- The Sixties in Africa and The United States: A Decade of Transformation, ISBN 979-8248335770, 2026
- The Turbulent Decade: Africa and The United States, ISBN 979-8248495740, 2026
