= Adam Kimbisa =

Tanzanian politician

Alhaj Adam Omari Kimbisa, better known as Adam Kimbisa, is a Tanzanian politician, currently serving the East African Legislative Assembly, better known as EALA. Prior to this, Hon. Kimbisa served as the mayor of the city of Dar es Salaam from 2006 to 2010 as well as general secretary of the Red Cross of Tanzania. Before being elected as Dar es Salaam's mayor, he has served in other government institutions, including Tanzanian's Ministry of Foreign Affairs.

== See also ==
- List of mayors of Dar es Salaam
- Timeline of Dar es Salaam
