= Malangali Secondary School =

Coordinates: 8°33′56″S 34°51′15″E

Malangali Secondary School was one of the leading academic institutions in colonial Tanganyika. It retained its reputation for academic excellence after Tanganyika won independence from Britain in December 1961.

It produced a large number of people who went on to fill government positions, especially in the civil service, during the early years of independence when the country did not have many educated people. Secondary school graduates formed the backbone of the civil service in Tanganyika (later Tanzania) during the post-colonial era.

Among its alumni were some of the people who played a major role in the struggle for independence in Tanganyika and in the new nation after it emerged from colonial rule. They included John Mwakangale who was one of the main leaders in the struggle for independence in the fifties, and Jeremiah Kasambala who became one of the first cabinet members under Prime Minister – later President – Julius Nyerere in the early years of independence.^{1}

== See also ==
- Malangali, Mufindi
