= Daily News (Tanzania) =

Newspaper in Tanzania

- Type: Daily newspaper
- Format: Broadsheet
- Owner: Government of Tanzania
- Publisher: Tanzania Standard (Newspapers) Limited
- Founded: 1930s
- Headquarters: Dar es Salaam, Tanzania
- Website: Newspaper Website

The Daily News is an English-language newspaper in Tanzania, the second-largest economy in the East African Community.

== History ==
The Daily News was the result of a forced merger of two papers. The Standard was first published as the Tanganyika Standard in January 1930 by the Tanganyikan East African Standard Limited. In 1967, it was taken over by a multinational London-Rhodesian Company (LONRHO). After the creation of Tanzania in 1964, the newspaper became known simply as The Standard. On 5 February 1970, The Standard was nationalised by the Tanzanian government.

The Nationalist was first published on 17 April 1964, as a government-owned daily, and struggled to compete with The Standard. On 16 January 1972, the Tanganyikan African National Union (TANU), the ruling party, decided to end the rivalry between the papers and forced a merger. The new paper, Daily News was first published on 26 April 1972. The company which publishes the newspaper retained the name "Standard" and is still known as Tanzania Standard (Newspapers) Limited.

Daily News has a Kiswahili sister paper Habari Leo, which was established in 2007. It is in tabloid form, unlike the Daily News which together with the Sunday News are all broadsheets. The papers are produced both in print and online. On 30 December 2011, Daily News announced its intention to launch a newly designed website. The move was aimed to extend its readership and keep abreast with latest developments in Information and Communication Technology (ICT). In May 2014, Jakaya Kikwete, the President of Tanzania, appointed Gabriel Nderumaki, as Managing Editor of Tanzania Standard (Newspapers) Limited.

== Editions ==
Daily News is the English language newspaper. Habari Leo is the Swahili language sister paper. There is also a Sunday edition called Sunday News and Habari Leo Jumapili. A new sports edition Spoti La Juzi Mwanangu was introduced in 2012 and is published once a week on Mondays.

== Columnists ==
Lawi Joel, Antony Tambwe, Tony Zakaria, Amby Lusekelo, Ali Mzige, Karl Lyimo, Jagjit Singh, Anne Outwater, Natasha K'okutangilira, Lusuga Kironde, and Makwaia wa Kuhenga.

Some of the people who were on the editorial staff of the Daily News in the early seventies also wrote some books. They include Sammy Mdee, Benjamin Mkapa, Haji Konde, Karim Essack, Clement Ndulute, Albert Mnenge Suluja, Godfrey Mwakikagile, and Shamlal Puri, all Tanzanians; David Martin, Trevor Grundy, and Ian Christie, British; Philip Ochieng, Kenyan; Zambian Francis Kasoma and Malawian Kanyama Chiume.
