= China–Tanzania relations =

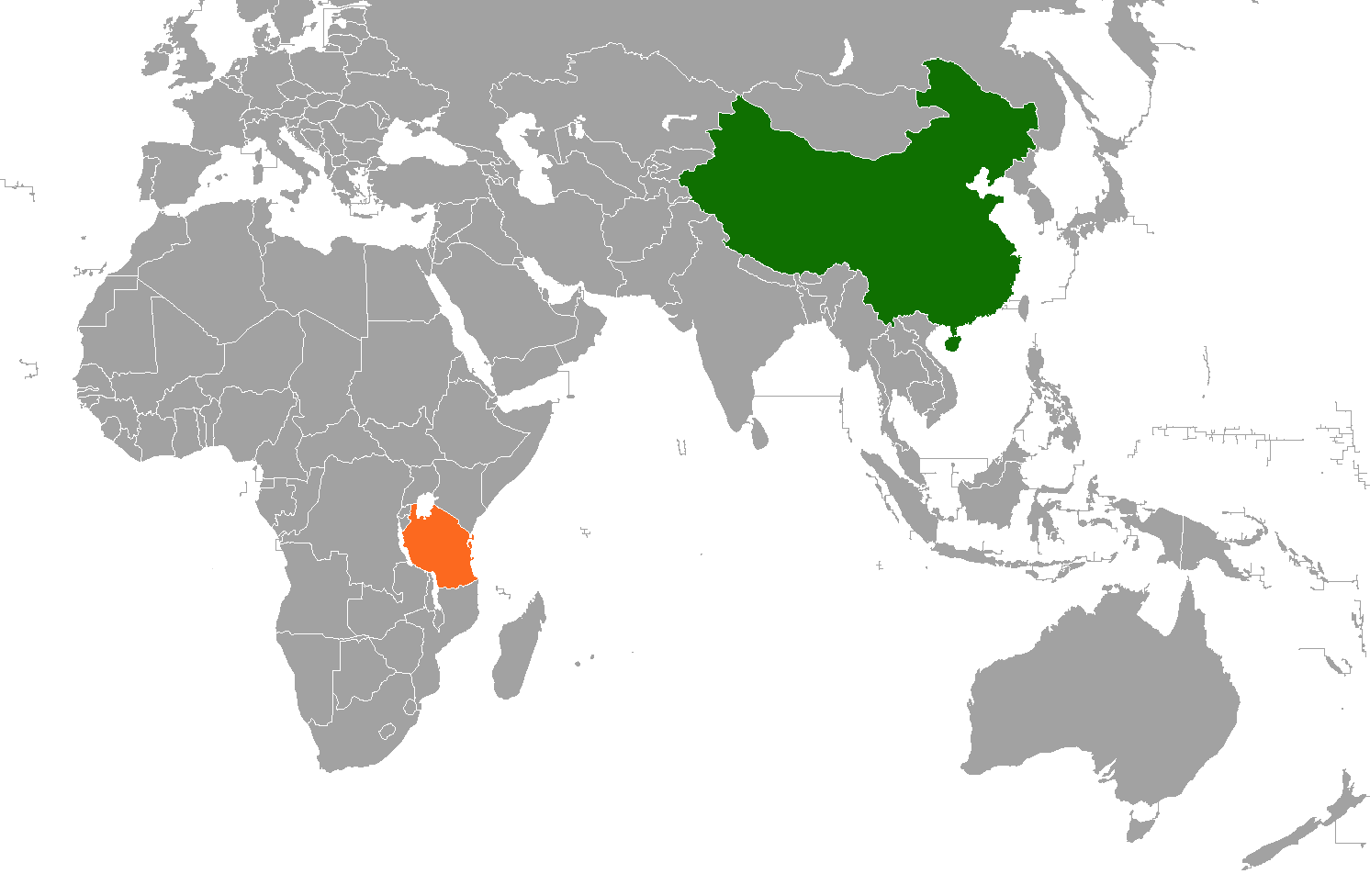
- China: Tanzania

The People's Republic of China (PRC) established diplomatic relations with Tanganyika and Zanzibar on December 9, 1961, and December 11, 1963, respectively. When Tanganyika and Zanzibar were united and became Tanzania on April 26, 1964, the PRC extended its diplomatic ties to it.

Tanganyika became the tenth African state to recognize the PRC in 1964 and the first to do it within days of independence. Military and political unrest in the 1960s in mainland Tanzania and Zanzibar further strengthened ties between the two countries. On January 12, 1964, the Zanzibar Revolution dramatically increased PRC government influence on the island as it quickly recognized the new regime and provided development assistance and military aid. Additionally, the mutiny of the Tanganyikan army on January 19, 1964, led President Julius Nyerere to request external military assistance to rebuild his army, which was answered first by the Chinese, who became primary suppliers of military assistance to the Tanzania People's Defence Force. Moreover, Tanzania's resistance to alignment with either Cold War superpower and continued emphasis on the liberation of Southern Africa created hostility with the West. In 1965, Tanzania and the PRC signed a ten-year friendship treaty. In 1970, the PRC became the major supplier of military assistance to the Tanzanian armed forces and became the largest bilateral source of development aid.

== Economic ties ==
From the outset of bilateral relations, China has assisted Tanzania with a variety of economic aid programs. During the Ujamaa era, China was Tanzania's most significant donor of foreign aid. More than half of China's aid to Africa in 1964 went to Tanzania. From 1964 to 1975, China provided Tanzania with monetary aid, technological support, doctors, teachers, cultural products, and other forms of both collaborative and unilateral assistance.

The most notable early aid project was the TAZARA Railway built from 1970 to 1975 with Chinese funding, labor and technical assistance. China funded the project after the World Bank and other potential donors declined to do so. The 1,860 km railway connects landlocked Zambia with Dar es Salaam. The Chinese government sent as many as 56,000 workers, and has continued to aid the railway in the decades since. Other early aid cooperative economic projects included establishing a joint shipping line and the Uhuru Railway.

From 2000 to 2011, there are approximately 62 Chinese official development finance projects identified in Tanzania through various media reports. These projects range from the Chinese government's efforts to launch the Tanzania Agricultural Development Bank, to a loan of $400 million to help alleviate the Kiwira coal mine's financial problems, and the construction of the Benjamin Mkapa Olympic Stadium, namely the National Stadium. In 2020, Tanzania canceled a $10 billion loan that was part of the Belt and Road Initiative.

In July 2025, in response to local backlash against Chinese-owned businesses, Tanzania prohibited foreign nationals from engaging in 15 types of business activities in the country, ranging from small-scale mining to parcel delivery.

=== Mining ===
In September 2011, China's Sichuan Hongda Co. signed an agreement with Tanzania to mine iron ore and coal; the joint venture with Tanzania's National Development Corporation is worth more than US$3 billion. The project has given the Tanzanians access to agreements with the Chinese government, including financing of natural gas pipelines, power plant developments, as well as a port, railway, and roadway upgrades. These mineral resources are concentrated in areas distant from the coast, posing infrastructural and logistical challenges that constrain economic activity like trade. This is evident from prospecting companies and their mining partners looking at major South and Eastern Tanzania projects citing infrastructure as the primary deterrent to investment. Mining companies require infrastructural networks that can handle high tonnage loads, which are widely absent and lack government stakeholder support and investment. However, the Central Development Corridor has engaged in significant planning to improve infrastructure in the northwest gold mining region and the nickel and iron-ore deposit regions along the borders with Rwanda and Burundi. Institutional infrastructure is available via the Central Corridor Transit Transport, which maintains and regulates roadways but has done little to improve rail and power grid improvements.

=== Information and Communications Technology (ICT) ===
In the 1960s, China helped Tanzania expand its domestic radio broadcasting, helping to reorganize the colonial-era Taganyika Broadcasting Company into Radio Tanzania and donating radio equipment and providing technical training.

Chinese financial institutions and technology companies supported Tanzania's telecommunications revolution of the 1990s and 2000s. In February 2009, the Tanzanian National ICT Broadband Fibreoptic Backbone (NICTBB) was launched to provide higher capacity ICT services at a more affordable rate to make Tanzania East Africa's digital hub. The project was financed with US$264 million in loans from Export–Import Bank of China and was implemented by the China International Telecommunications Construction Corporation (CITCC) and Huawei. In 2010, phase II of the NICTBB project launched with an additional US$100 million in loans from China's Exim bank with the stipulation that Chinese suppliers and equipment be used for the project; therefore, the partnership with the CITCC and Huawei continued. The project is being used to lower costs of communication, promote e-learning, e-health, e-commerce, e-government, and facilitate the development of science and technology.

== Infrastructure ==
=== Tazara ===
The Tanzania-Zambia Railway (Tazara) is a 1,860 km long railway from Dar es Salaam, Tanzania, to Kaprimposhi, Zambia, to link Central and Southern Africa with East Africa to facilitate trade, tourism, and inter-state cooperation. On September 5, 1967, the first agreement regarding the railway was signed by China, Tanzania, and Zambia, representing the beginning of China's formal commitment to the project in that they agreed to provide the technical and professional manpower needed for each phase of construction. By 1970 China officially agreed to finance the project by providing a $401 million interest-free loan shared equally between Tanzania and Zambia. The loan was repayable over 30 years with a 5-year grace period and required repayments to be made in third-party currency or from the two countries exports. The railway project implemented by the Chinese Engineering Construction Company included the construction of 320 bridges, 22 tunnels, and 2,225 culverts along the trains pathway and required additional financing from the Chinese to cover the cost of power, rolling stock, steel rails, signaling equipment, cement, stations, a training school, workshops, and other related infrastructure. Since 2010, China has continued its technical and financial support for the Tazara by funding and upgrading the railway to achieve increased operational efficiency to help meet growing passenger and trade demand.

=== Unity Bridge ===
The Ponte da Unidad/Umoja, also known as the unity bridge, is a 720-meter-long bridge connecting Tanzania with Mozambique across the Rovuma River. The China GeoEngineering Corporation implemented the project with funding from the Tanzanian and Mozambique governments at a total cost of US$26.8 million. The bridge, which opened in May 2010, is lowering business costs in the region by facilitating a more accessible route for trade and travel between Southern African and East Africa.

=== National stadium ===
In 2007 the Beijing Construction Engineering Group completed the construction of the Tanzanian National Stadium located in Dar es Salaam. The new stadium was estimated to cost more than $60 million, with the Tanzanian government contributing more than half of the project's total financing. The stadium is considered another landmark accomplishment in China-Tanzanian relations, a sentiment communicated by former Chinese Premier Wen Jiabao, who emphasized the high-quality construction and importance of the two nations' cooperation in his visit to the site in 2006.

=== Bagamoyo Port ===
Bagamoyo is the site of a Chinese-run special economic zone with a mega-port constructed by China Merchants Ports Holdings. In 2012, The Tanzanian government, Oman, China Merchants Ports Holdings came to an agreement on a flagship Belt and Road initiative project with a total investment of over US$10 billion. In addition to the port itself, the 3,000-hectare site will link Tanzania's new Standard gauge railway and the Tanzania-Zambia railway. However, the project faced several challenges, including in 2016, when the project was briefly canceled.

=== Zanzibar International Airport ===
In January 2011, the Chinese Beijing Construction Engineering Group began upgrading Tanzania's Zanzibar international airport by renovating terminal 2 and constructing terminal 3. The Tanzanian government received US$70 million in financing from China's Exim Bank to support the project, which is projected to support the travel of 1.5 million passengers annually. In addition to expanding air transport for passengers, the project also improves air transport of goods to and from Zanzibar by providing a safe and reliable airport for large aircraft and a high volume of flights.

=== Belt and Road Initiative ===
Modern economic and infrastructural cooperation between Tanzania and China is highly connected to China's Belt and Road Initiative (BRI). In 2013, China expanded its Belt and Road Initiative (BRI) as a form of foreign policy mainly to construct an overland network of infrastructure to better connect Chinese trade and further economic integration to other regions of the world, with a particular focus on East Africa, Asia, and Eastern Europe. The initiative includes building and financing railways, highways, power grids, gas & oil pipelines, telecommunications infrastructure, industrial parks, special economic zones, shipping facilities, information technology, alternative energy sectors, and more.

Tanzania joined the BRI in 2018. The Chinese government and Chinese companies coordinate these efforts with Tanzanian stakeholders through free trade agreements, generous lines of credit, and other measures intended to generate an investment-friendly environment for foreign investors.

== Sovereignty issues ==
Tanzania follows the one China principle. It recognizes the People's Republic of China as the sole government of China and Taiwan as an integral part of China's territory, and supports all efforts by the PRC to "achieve national reunification". It also considers Hong Kong, Xinjiang and Tibet to be China's internal affairs. Tanzania was among the African countries which expressed support for the Chinese government during the 2019-2020 Hong Kong protests. In October 2019, Tanzania's chief government spokesperson stated that the country supports China's one country, two systems policy, that the Hong Kong government was taking the best approach to the situation, and that other countries should support China.

== Political relations ==
Tanzania's ruling Chama Cha Mapinduzi (CCM) party maintains ties with the Chinese Communist Party (CCP).

With the stated goal of advancing Chinese-African party-to-party relations, the International Department of the Chinese Communist Party and Central Party School of the Chinese Communist Party fund the Julius Nyerere Leadership School in Tanzania. The school opened in February 2022 with US$40 million in funding and is a physical venue for political and diplomatic exchanges between the CCP and African ruling parties, particularly from Tanzania, South Africa, Mozambique, Angola, Namibia, and Zimbabwe.

== Chinese enclaves ==
Enclaves are distinct territorial, cultural, or social units enclosed within the boundaries of a foreign territory. Chinese enclaves have formed in Tanzania, evident from Chinese workers not venturing into the local community, consuming local entertainment, or gaining cultural exposure outside of work, which is often company policy. Chinese enclaves have been formed primarily due to language barriers as older Chinese managers often do not speak English and younger managers struggle with the Tanzanian's heavily accented English. Additionally, very few Chinese workers speak Bemba, a dialect of East Africa's Copperbelt, or Swahili, the national language of Tanzania. In the cities of Chambishi, Kitwe, and Urafiki Chinese management teams live in segregated houses known as the "China houses" or the "Chinese compound". These residential quarters for Chinese workers often include their own security guards, ping-pong tables, cooks, television, video and DVD media from China, athletic spaces, vegetable gardens, and livestock. The salaries of workers living in the Urafiki compound go directly to their bank accounts in China to encourage saving, the staff is only provided an allowance to buy items like fruit or toiletries because entertainment and necessities are provided in the compound; this further alienates workers from the local population.

== Military ties ==
Tanganyika had been a leading country in supporting anti-colonial movements in the south of Africa, including leading the Pan-Africa Freedom Movement for East, Central, and Southern Africa (PAFMESCA) and hosting the Organization of African Unity. Tanzania continued to host anti-colonial and anti-apartheid movements, providing them with training and facilitating the delivery of arms from other countries. In 1970, China became the largest supplier of arms to Tanzania-based anti-colonial and anti-apartheid fighters.

In 1972, the International Institute for Strategic Studies (IISS) listed the Tanzania People's Defence Force (TPDF) army with 10,000 personnel, four infantry battalions, 20 T-59, 14 Chinese T-62 light tanks, some BTR-40 and BTR-152, Soviet field artillery and Chinese mortars.

China first began training Tanzanian pilots in the early 1970s. It has continued to support Tanzanian air force training as of at least 2023.

The Uganda–Tanzania War happened in 1978–1979, in which the first tank battle happened in African continent, between Tanzania's Chinese tanks with Libya's Soviet tanks.

In 1992, the IISS listed the army with, among others, 30 Chinese Type 59 and 32 T-54/55 main battle tanks.

Tanzania is one of China's most important military partners in Africa. On an annual basis, Tanzania sends a significant amount of officers and NCOs to train in China.

== Elephant poaching and Chinese nationals ==
The published report of the 14th meeting of the Convention on International Trade in Endangered Species of Wild Fauna and Flora (3–15 June 2007 at the Hague, Netherlands), expressed explicit concern over the

involvement of Chinese nationals in the direct procurement of ivory in elephant range States in Africa. The ETIS data illustrate that Chinese nationals have been arrested, detained or absconded in at least 126 seizure cases – representing some 14.2 tonnes of ivory – which have occurred in, or originated from, 22 African elephant range States, including Botswana, Cameroon, Congo, Côte d’Ivoire, the Democratic Republic of the Congo, Equatorial Guinea, Ghana, Guinea, Kenya, Liberia, Malawi, Mali, Mozambique, Namibia, Nigeria, Senegal, South Africa, the Sudan, Uganda, the United Republic of Tanzania, Zambia and Zimbabwe. This is a relatively recent phenomenon as 87 % of these cases occurred in the most recent period since 1998. With an already strong and growing economic presence throughout Africa, Chinese nationals are now well positioned to exploit direct sources of illicit ivory in a manner that was not the case in the past.

In its 2013 report Transnational Organized Crime in Eastern Africa: A Threat Assessment, the United Nations Office on Drugs and Crime found that

China’s recent wave of investment in Africa has brought thousands of Chinese executives and workers to the continent, including countries where ivory is openly sold, often carved into items for the Asian market. It may be transported in luggage or by post in small quantities, for personal use or re-sale at great profit in Asian markets. The quantities involved are generally small (although tusks cut into suitcase-sized chunks have been detected), but, due to their frequency, could constitute a major source of supply.

Chinese nationals on the ground in Tanzania have been jailed in connection with large-scale interdictions. In November 2013 three Chinese nationals were arrested in Dar es Salaam with a stockpile of 797 tusks.

Growing purchasing power among Chinese tuhao and baofahu has combined with corruption among Tanzanian rangers and police to devastating effect. Between 2010 and 2013, over three tonnes of ivory has been seized in Tanzania, and two-thirds of the elephants at Selous Game Reserve—Tanzania's largest—have disappeared.

According to the United Nations report, the link between Chinese demand and Tanzanian supply is the single most destructive influence on the African elephant population:

- Recent research indicates that the rate of poaching in Eastern Africa has increased, rising to levels that could threaten the local elephant population.
- The bulk of the large ivory shipments from Africa to Asia appears to pass through the container ports of Kenya and the United Republic of Tanzania, where interventions could be addressed.
- It is estimated that between 5,600 and 15,400 elephants are poached in Eastern Africa annually, producing between 56 and 154 metric tons of illicit ivory, of which two-thirds (37 tons) is destined for Asia, worth around US$30 million in 2011.
- Expatriate Chinese residents in Eastern Africa comprise some of the most important middlemen. Although they have taken measures to address the illicit trade, Thailand and China remain two of the most important destinations.
- Recent Interpol operations...have found a growing number of carved objects...with vendors speaking Chinese to their clients.

In the immediate aftermath of the UNODC findings, Tanzania's Deputy Minister for Natural Resources and Tourism was forced to respond to citizen complaints of "... Chinese nationals, engaging in the massacre of our animals and transporting them to their countries for their own benefit." Lazaro Nyalandu said that the government of Tanzania would take action against poachers without regard to their countries of origin, and that any threat against tourism revenues would be taken seriously.

In March 2014 Chinese national Yu Bo appeared before the Kisutu Resident Magistrates’ Court in Dar es Salaam, accused of illegally collecting 81 elephant tusks. Yu petitioned for leniency, citing his several dependents and lack of criminal history, as he entered a guilty plea. Senior Resident Magistrate Devota Kisoka imposed a fine of 9,781,204,900 Tanzanian shillings, in default of which Yu is detained in Tanzania pending appeal of a 20-year sentence. Chinese officials have taken steps to curb the influx of illegal ivory—of the 900 ivory seizures performed annually in China, 90% involve items uncovered in hand inspections of travelers' luggage—and they are not known to have offered legal-, financial-, or political assistance to Chinese nationals suspected of poaching in Tanzania.

== Medical cooperation ==
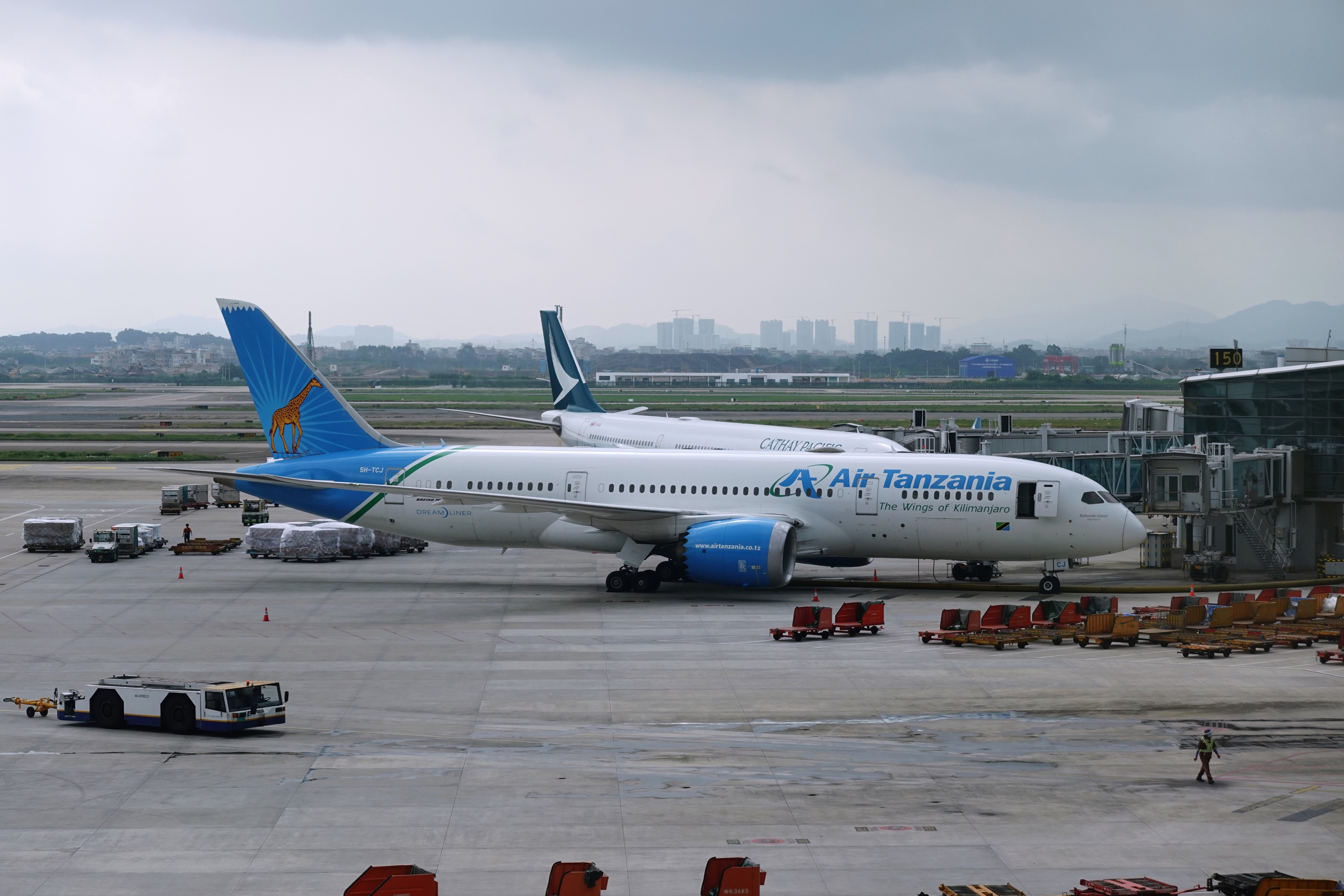
Air Tanzania Boeing 787 at Guangzhou Airport.

On its 2017 medical mission to Africa, the People's Liberation Army Navy hospital ship Peace Ark traveled to Tanzania, where it treated 6,421 Tanzanian patients.

== Resident diplomatic missions ==
- China has an embassy in Dar es Salaam and a consulate-general in Zanzibar.
- Tanzania has an embassy in Beijing and a consulate-general in Guangzhou.

== See also ==
- Chinese people in Tanzania
