= Channel Ten (Tanzania) =

Tanzanian television channel

Channel Ten is a private Tanzanian television channel founded in 2000. The channel is owned by Africa Media Group and primarily conducts its programming in the Swahili language.

Channel Ten started broadcasting in February 2000 on UHF channel 58 in collaboration with TVAfrica, serving as an affiliate of the network until its closure. By 2003, it had covered the entire coastal region of Tanzania and planned to cover Arusha and Dodoma. At the time, it also implemented a project from an NGO about HIV/AIDS in collaboration with its sister station Dar es Salaam Television. During the 2000s, the channel aired imported sitcoms.

Makwaia wa Kuhenga already had his show on the channel in 2010. On 26 January 2011, Channel Ten journalist Munir Zakaria was attacked in Zanzibar by local policemen and secessionists. On 2 September 2012, channel reporter Daudi Mwangosi died. By 2013, Star Media entered into an arrangement with Channel Ten to provide a digital multiplex.
