= Chinese people in Tanzania =

Total population
- 30,000+ (2013)

Regions with significant populations
- Dar es Salaam · Zanzibar

Languages
- Chinese, English

Related ethnic groups
- Overseas Chinese

There were Chinese people in Tanzania as early as 1891. However, most of the Chinese in the country trace their roots to three distinct waves of migration: 1930s settlement on Zanzibar, workers sent by the Chinese government in the 1960s and 1970s as part of development assistance to Tanzania, and private entrepreneurs and traders who began doing business there during the 1990s.

== History ==
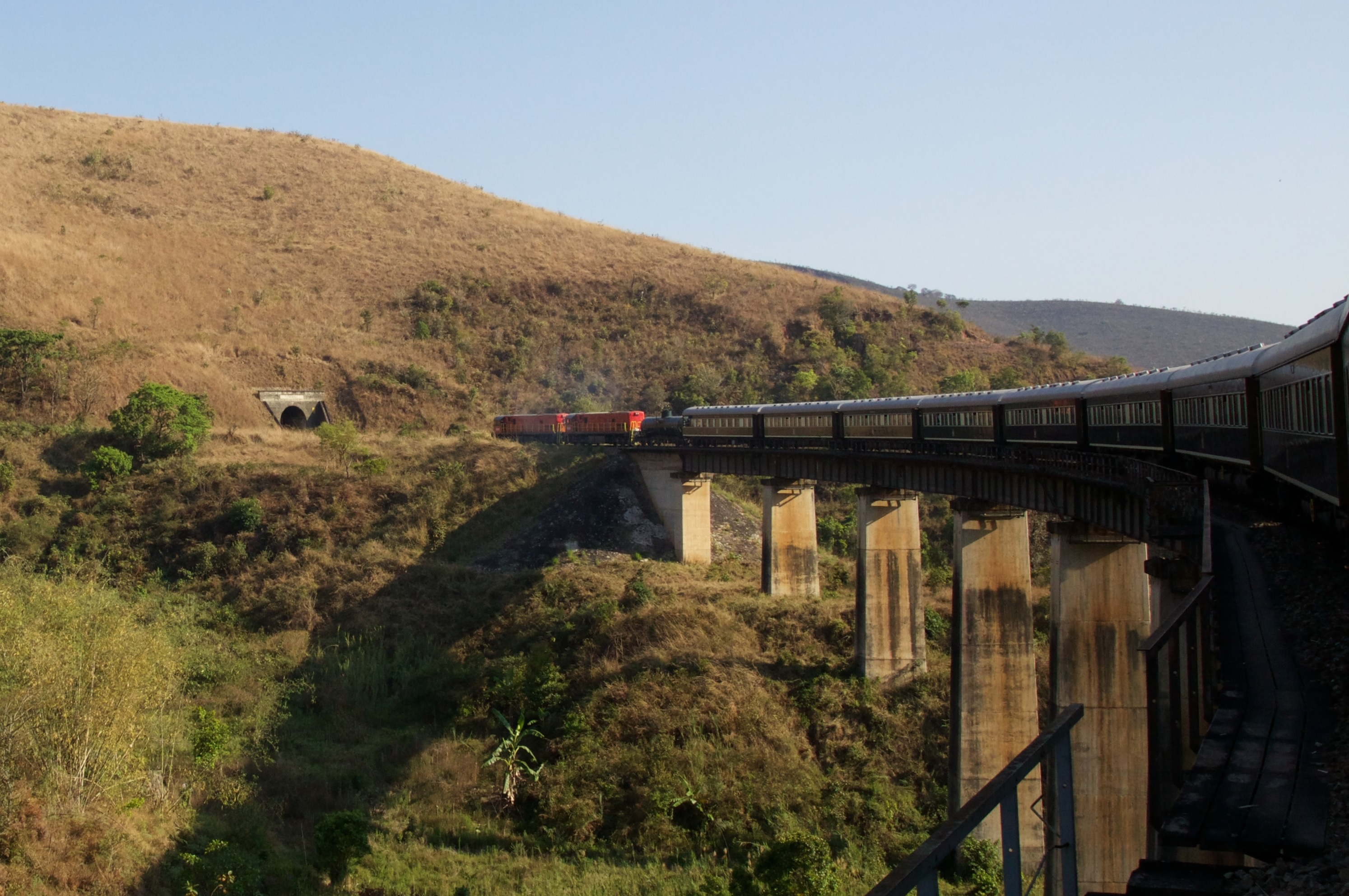
The Chinese built TAZARA Railway linking Zambia with Tanzania.

Most foreign labour in Tanganyika's history as a German colony came from other parts of Africa; however, there were a few Chinese as well. In 1891, the German East Africa Company hired 491 Chinese and Javanese labourers from Singapore to work on plantations in Usambara. Separately, a community of overseas Chinese began to form on the island of Zanzibar, by then a British possession, in the 1930s. The Chinese noodles they produced there became a popular staple food for the local population, especially for the evening iftar meal which marks the end of the day's fasting during Ramadan.

In 1969, a few years after Tanganyika and Zanzibar achieved independence from the British Empire and merged to become Tanzania, the People's Republic of China agreed to provide financing and technical assistance for the construction of the TAZARA Railway, intended to give Zambia an alternative to an existing railway route passing through Rhodesia, and allow them to export copper through ports in Tanzania instead. The first thousand Chinese railway workers came to Dar es Salaam on board the ocean liner Yao Hao in August 1969.; they would be followed by twenty to thirty thousand more in the next five years. At any given time, Chinese composed between twenty-five and thirty percent, or 13,000, of the thirty to forty thousand workers on the railway. Most of them returned home after their stint in the country, but due to the emphasis placed on speedy construction, they had little time to train their Tanzanian counterparts to replace them; as a result, teams of Chinese experts continued to work for the railway authority as late as 2004. During these years, China also sent some advisors to Zanzibar for work on other development projects. Finally, roughly 200 doctors from Jiangsu were dispatched all over Tanzania on two-year stints; people's positive experience with these doctors laid the foundations for the later popularity of traditional Chinese medicine, though they themselves were not TCM practitioners.

The population of old overseas Chinese continued to decrease; by 2008, just twenty remained in Dar es Salaam, including a Meixian Hakka couple from South Africa who ran a Chinese restaurant, and a number of Burmese Chinese who traced their roots to the Taishan and Kaiping counties of Guangdong. However, their numbers were bolstered by the arrival of new expatriate businessmen and entrepreneurs beginning in the 1990s.

== Numbers ==
In 2000, statistics of Tanzania's Immigration Department showed that they had issued work or residence permits to just 239 Chinese nationals, making them one of the smaller groups of foreigners in the country. However, China's official Xinhua News Agency reported in 2008 that 10,000 Chinese people live in the country. In January 2013, the Chinese Ambassador to Tanzania was quoted saying that there were more than 30,000 Chinese people living in Tanzania.

== Business and employment ==
The new wave of Chinese expatriates in the 1990s initially came to Tanzania with the intention of working in more typical industries, such as construction, textiles, or food products. However, the World Health Organization's push for privatisation of health care in Tanzania provided unexpected business opportunities to them; despite the fact that most lacked any medical training, they began setting up traditional Chinese medicine clinics, the first of which was established in 1996. Qualified practitioners came later, but in the early 2000s, the majority were still learning on the job.

== See also ==
- China–Tanzania relations
- Indians in Tanzania
