= John Mwakangale =

Tanzanian politician (1923 - 2002)

John Benedict Mugogo Mwakangale (13th November 1923-January 2002) was a Tanzanian freedom fighter and politician who was the first Regional Commissioner of Dodoma (1962-1967), Regional Commissioner of Mbeya(1964-1965), Tabora (1967-1968) and Iringa (1968-1970). He was one of the main leaders in the struggle for independence in Tanganyika (now part of Tanzania) during British colonial rule. When the country gained independence, Mwakangale joined the first cabinet of Julius Nyerere, the first President of Tanzania as Minister of Labour. Mwakangale is also regarded as a Pan-Africanist and a staunch African nationalist. He was also the first leader whom Nelson Mandela met in 1962 when he escaped from prison seeking assistance from other African leaders. Mandela gave a detailed account about that encounter in his book Long Walk to Freedom.

== Career ==
When the Tanganyika African National Union (TANU) was formed in Dar es Salaam in July 1954 under the leadership of Julius Nyerere — in order to lead the struggle for independence, Mwakangale became one of its most prominent leaders in the country and in the Southern Highlands Province. He was also one of the leaders of the Pan-African Freedom Movement for East and Central Africa (PAFMECA) which was founded in Mwanza, Tanganyika, in September 1958 under the leadership of Julius Nyerere. PAFMECA mobilised and coordinated the independence struggle in the East-Central African region comprising a number of countries: Tanganyika, Kenya, Zanzibar, Uganda, Nyasaland (renamed Malawi), Northern Rhodesia (now Zambia), and Southern Rhodesia (renamed Zimbabwe). It was renamed the Pan-African Freedom Movement for East, Central and Southern Africa (PAFMECSA) after it was expanded to include the countries of southern Africa, including apartheid South Africa. Mwakangale remained a prominent leader in the larger freedom movement.

In 1958, Mwakangale was one of the few African leaders who were elected to the Legislative Council (LEGCO), a colonial parliament dominated by the British colonial rulers led by the British governor of Tanganyika. The governor during that time was Sir Edward Twining. He served as governor from 1949 to 1958. He was succeeded by Sir Richard Turnbull in July 1958. Turnbull was the last governor and relinquished power to Julius Nyerere on independence day, 9 December 1961. Nyerere became the first prime minister of the newly independent nation of Tanganyika.

Members of LEGCO were elected on a tripartite system representing three racial categories: Europeans, who were mostly British settlers; Asians, mostly Tanganyikans of Indian and Pakistan origin, a category which also included Arabs; and Africans, or blacks, who constituted the vast majority of the population of Tanganyika. Mwakangale represented the Southern Highlands Province in the colonial legislature where together with his colleagues he continued to campaign for independence.

The Southern Highlands Province which he represented in LEGCO was one of seven provinces of colonial Tanganyika. The provinces were Western Province which was the largest; Lake Province, Northern Province, Central Province, Coast Province, Southern Province, and the Southern Highlands Province which was simply known as the Southern Highlands. The provinces were divided into smaller administrative units called regions in 1963.

After Tanganyika won independence in December 1961, Mwakangale continued to be a member of parliament. Mwakangale was also described as the most "anti-white" and "anti-British" member of the government. He was also very defensive of the interests of African workers. Humphrey Taylor, a British who served as a District Officer (D.O.) in Tanganyika from 1959 to 1962, wrote the following about John Mwakangale when he was a cabinet member serving as minister of labour under Prime Minister Nyerere:

"Soon after Tanganyika became independent, and near the end of my time as a District Officer in Njombe, I received a call from the British manager of the Commonwealth Development Corporation’s wattle plantation and factory a few miles from the District Office. The factory took the bark that was stripped from the wattle trees and used it to make tannin. The workers there were on strike for higher pay, in part because they expected to earn more now that the country was no longer a British colony.

The manager called me because he was afraid that a large crowd of strikers near the factory might attack and damage it. He asked for police protection. I arrived a little while later with ten or fifteen African policemen. I cannot remember if they were armed with anything other than truncheons. It is possible that they also brought rifles. Anyway, everything passed off peacefully without a serious incident. The police and I stood for a couple of hours between the strikers and the factory. The strikers then dispersed and went away. There was no violence of any kind.

However the local union leader sent a fiery telegram to the Minister of Labour, John Mwakangale in Dar es Salaam, in which he wrote that there was a dangerous crisis with provocative action by the British colonial District Officer and the police and that there was a 'danger of the spilling of blood.' Mwakangale was believed to be the most aggressively anti-white or anti- British member of the government. He telegrammed back to say he was coming to Njombe the next day and he sent us a very sharp message criticizing my action and asking to meet with us as soon as he arrived.

At the start of the meeting he was very aggressive and hostile, but as he listened to the manager, the police and to me, he understood what had, and had not, happened. At the end of the meeting we went off and had some beers together.

A little while later, I was in Dar es Salaam to catch the plane on my way home at the end of my brief colonial career. As I was walking on a street there I saw a small group of African cabinet ministers, including Mwakangale, walking towards me on the other side of the street. When he saw me, he dashed across the road, welcomed me enthusiastically, took me by the hand, and brought me across to meet his cabinet colleagues. He told me how sorry he was to hear that I was leaving Tanganyika." - Humphrey Taylor, Danger of Spilling Blood

John Mwakangale was also the first leader of Tanganyika whom Nelson Mandela met in January 1962 when Mandela secretly left South Africa to seek assistance from other African countries in the struggle against white minority rule in his home country. Tanganyika was also the first independent African country Mandela visited after he left South Africa for the first time. He met Mwakangale in Mbeya, the capital of the Southern Highlands Province. Mwakangale had been assigned to receive Mandela in Mbeya on behalf of the government of Tanganyika. After meeting Mwakangale, Mandela flew to Dar es Salaam the next day where he met Julius Nyerere. Nyerere was the first leader of an independent African country Mandela met. In his autobiography, Long Walk to Freedom, Mandela recalled his meeting with Mwakangale in the town of Mbeya and how, for the first time in his life, he felt free and proud to be in an independent African country:

"Early the next morning we left (Bechuanaland, now Botswana) for Mbeya, a town near the Northern Rhodesian border....(In Mbeya) we booked in a local hotel and found a crowd of blacks and whites sitting on the veranda making polite conversation. Never before had I been in a public place or hotel where there was no color bar. We were waiting for Mr. John Mwakangale of the Tanganyika African National Union, a member of Parliament and unbeknown to us he had already called looking for us. An African guest approached the white receptionist. 'Madam, did a Mr. Mwakangale inquire after these two gentlemen?' he asked, pointing to us. 'I am sorry, sir,' she replied. 'He did but I forgot to tell them.' 'Please be careful, madam,' he said in a polite but firm tone. 'These men are our guests and we would like them to receive proper attention.'

I then truly realized that I was in a country ruled by Africans. For the first time in my life, I was a free man. Though I was a fugitive and wanted in my own land, I felt the burden of oppression lifting from my shoulders. Everywhere I went in Tanganyika my skin color was automatically accepted rather than instantly reviled. I was being judged for the first time not by the color of my skin by the measure of my mind and character. Although I was often homesick during my travels, I nevertheless felt as though I were truly home for the first time....

We arrived in Dar es Salaam the next day and I met with Julius Nyerere, the newly independent country's first president. We talked at his house, which was not at all grand, and I recall that he drove himself in a simple car, a little Austin. This impressed me, for it suggested that he was a man of the people. Class, Nyerere always insisted, was alien to Africa; socialism indigenous."

== Nationalism ==
Professor John Iliffe in his book A Modern History of Tanganyika described John Mwakangale as a "vehement nationalist," an assessment underscored by some of the remarks Mwakangale made in parliament. According to Professor Paul Bjerk in his book Building a Peaceful Nation: Julius Nyerere and the Establishment of Sovereignty in Tanzania, 1960 - 1964:

In October 1961, racialist sentiments sprang up even among his (Nyerere's) own party members when a proposal was brought forward to delay citizenship for non-Africans for five years after independence. Christopher (Kasanga) Tumbo urged for a distinction between "native"' and "immigrant races". A TANU member from Mbeya, J. B. Mwakangale, went so far as to call for the resignation of non-African ministers after independence. "We have no proof of their loyalty. They are bluffing and cheating us," Mwakangale alleged.

In response, Nyerere threatened that he and his ministers would resign if the assembly did not support TANU's policy. Nyerere denounced the hypocrisy of a policy favoring Africans in a country that was just about to emerge from a racially prejudiced colonial state. Visibly angry, he argued that once racial bias was introduced to Tanganyikan politics its logic would take a life of its own, leading to widespread ethnic animosity:

A day will come when we will say all people were created equal except the Masai, except the Wagogo, except the Waha, except the polygamists, except the Muslims, etc...You know what happens when people begin to get drunk with power and glorify their race, the Hitlers, that is what they do. You know where they lead the human race, the Verwoerds of South Africa, that is what they do...

I am going to repeat, and repeat very firmly, that this Government has rejected, and rejected completely any ideas that citizenship with the duties and rights of citizenship of this country, are going to based on anything except loyalty to this country. - (Paul Bjerk, Building a Peaceful Nation: Julius Nyerere and the Establishment of Sovereignty in Tanzania, 1960 – 1964, Rochester, New York: University of Rochester Press, 2015, pp. 72 – 73).

John Mwakangale also strongly opposed the recruitment of American Peace Corps to work in Tanganyika contending that they were there to destabilise and topple the government. "Wherever they are we always hear of trouble, you hear of people trying to overthrow the government. These people are not here for peace, they are here for trouble. We do not want any more Peace Corps." He was quoted in a news report, "M.P. Attacks American Peace Corps," which was the main story on the front page of the Tanganyika Standard (renamed Daily News in 1972), 12 June 1964.

Professor Henry Bienen, in his book, Tanzania: Party Transformation and Economic Development, stated that citizenship on non-racial basis and equality for all in the new nation of Tanganyika which was soon to achieve independence "provoked anti-Commonwealth and racialistic sentiments among TANU members in the National Assembly. One MP (John Mwakangale), who was to become both a regional commissioner and a parliamentary secretary, said:

'I think 75 per cent of the non-African population still regard an African in Tanganyika as an inferior human being. Why is it so? Is it because the white population has been dominating us, both economically and politically, and their neighbours, the Asians, have been economically dominating us, we Africans...Do you think the individual African forming the vast majority of the population will agree to have equal rights with the Europeans and Asians? My answer is no...

All foreigners who are living in Tanganyika now and have transferred their money to their home countries or to other countries should within this period of five years bring their money back. I repeat...they must bring it back. From now on those foreigners who are rich...should contribute at least 15 per cent of their money to us, the Tanganyika National Fund.'

Other MPs expressed similar sentiments...National Assembly members Tumbo, Msindai, Mtaki and Wambura expressed similar opinions. Msindai was to become an area commissioner in 1962. Mtaki and Wambura became regional commissioners and are now junior ministers...

This peroration was cut by the speaker after Mr. Mwakangale claimed that 'they are bluffing us, cheating us, doing all sorts of things showing that they are our friends - but I know...'

Mr. Nyerere rose in reply to say: 'There cannot be a bigger difference between the speakers [for others took a similar line] and this Government here. Discrimination against human beings because of their color is exactly what we have been fighting against'...

Earlier in October 1961, many of the men who were later to speak up in the National Assembly attacked the government's and Nyerere's position in the NEC (National Executive Committee, supreme body of authority in TANU - Tanganyika African National Union). They persisted with these attacks in another NEC meeting of January 1962, during which Nyerere made up his mind to resign. He was to say in January that he first considered resigning in October 1961, after the National Assembly debates.

By then (January 1962), the pressure from middle-level leaders - regional/district secretaries and chairmen, MPs, MNE, administrative secretaries in National Headquarters, and trade union leaders - had become very great. When the Citizenship Bill was presented to the National Assembly in October 1961, Nyerere said he would resign unless he carried the House with him. Under this threat, the Bill was carried overwhelmingly, but dissidence was not ended within TANU over racial issues which fed on economic imbalances. Throughout the last two months of 1961 unrest persisted, and Asians were periodically threatened in various parts of Tanganyika." - Henry Bienen, Tanzania: Party transformation and Economic Development, Princeton, New Jersey, USA: Princeton University Press, 1967, pp. 162 - 163).

== Bibliography ==
- Mwakikagile, Godfrey, Nyerere and Africa: End of an Era, New Africa Press (2010), Fifth Edition, Pretoria, South Africa, pp. 94, 105, 112, 119, 329–330, 492
- Mwakikagile, Godfrey, Life in Tanganyika in The Fifties, Third Edition, New Africa Press (2010), Dar es Salaam, Tanzania, p. 149
- Illife, John, A Modern History of Tanganyika, Cambridge University Press (1979), Cambridge, pp. 560, 565
- Aminzade, Ronald, Race, Nation, and Citizenship in Post-Colonial Africa: The Case of Tanzania, New York, Cambridge University Press(2013), p. 16
- Longford, Michael, The Flags Changed at Midnight: Towards the Independence of Tanganyika, Gracwing (2001), Leominster, Herefordshire, U.K., p. 48.
- Chiume, M. W. Kanyama, Kwacha: An Autobiography, East African Publishing House, Nairobi, Kenya (1975), p. 92
- Chiume, M.W.K., Autobiography of Kanyama Chiume, Panaf (1982), London, p. 100
- Lawrence, David, Tanzania: The Land, Its People and Contemporary Life, New Africa Press (2009), Dar es Salaam, Tanzania, pp. 199–200
- Brennan, James R., Taifa: Making Nation and Race in Urban Tanzania, Athens, Ohio, USA, (2012), p. 164.
- Mandela, Nelson, Long Walk to Freedom: The Autobiography of Nelson Mandela, Little, Brown and Co., New York, (1994), p. 538, ISBN 0-316-87496-5
- Bjerk, Paul, Building a Peaceful Nation: Julius Nyerere and the Establishment of Sovereignty in Tanzania, 1960 – 1964, Rochester, New York: University of Rochester Press, (2015), pp. 72 – 73
- Mwakikagile, Godfrey, The African Liberation Struggle: Reflections, Intercontinental Books (2018), p. 85, ISBN 9789987160105 (last retrieved 6 December 2018)
- Godfrey Mwakikagile: Eurocentric Africanist?

https://sites.google.com/site/intercontinentalbookcentre/godfrey-mwakikagile-a-eurocentric-pan-africanist

- Godfrey Mwakikagile: African Studies - Postcolonial Africa

https://sites.google.com/site/intercontinentalbookcentre/godfrey-mwakikagile-african-studies---postcolonial-africa
