= Austin Shaba =

Tanzanian politician (1925–1988)

Austin Kapere Edward Shaba (12 December 1925 – 10 March 1988) was one of the leaders of Tanganyika, later Tanzania, from the time the country won independence from Britain on 9 December 1961.

== Life and career ==
Shaba participated in the independence struggle and became a cabinet member in the first independence cabinet under Prime Minister Julius Nyerere, serving as minister of local government. Nyerere became president of Tanganyika on the country's first independence anniversary on 9 December 1962 and Shaba continued to be a cabinet member.

After Tanganyika united with Zanzibar on 26 April 1964 to form the United Republic of Tanganyika and Zanzibar, renamed the United Republic of Tanzania on 29 October 1964, Shaba continued to be a cabinet member in the new union government and served as minister of health and housing. He was also a member of parliament for Mtwara and served as deputy speaker of parliament in the 1980s.

He became even more well known after it was learned that he held all those senior government positions and other posts when he was not a citizen of Tanganyika or Tanzania. He was born in Mzimba, Nyasaland which was renamed Malawi after independence, and moved to Tanganyika with his parents when he was a child. He grew up in Tanganyika and attended school in Tanganyika. He was also trained as a medical assistant at Tanganyika's national hospital in the nation's capital Dar es Salaam and worked at hospitals in Tanganyika.

After working as a medical assistant for some time, he resigned and joined the independence struggle, becoming an active member of the Tanganyika African National Union (TANU), the party that led the country to independence.

After it was learned that he was not a citizen, he lost all his government positions and the other posts he held and eventually returned to his home country, Malawi, where he later died on 10 March 1988, at the age of 62.

== Sources ==
- Godfrey Mwakikagile, Nyerere and Africa: End of an Era, New Africa Press, Fifth Edition, Pretoria, South Africa, 2010. About Austin Shaba, see pp. 104, 105, 121, 377; about Michael Kamaliza, see pp. 104, 119, 365, 366, 369, 370, 371, 372, 702; about Kanyama Chiume, see pp. 80, 488.
- Godfrey Mwakikagile, Growing up in a Border District and Resolving the Tanzania-Malawi Lake Dispute: Compromise and concessions, African Renaissance Press, 2022.
