= Daudi Mwangosi =

Tanzanian journalist

- Born: Daudi Mwangosi ca. 1972
- Died: September 2, 2012; Nyololo village outside of Iringa Region, Tanzania
- Cause of death: Tear gas canister fired by police officers
- Occupation: Television journalist
- Years active: Since 2005
- Employer: Channel Ten
- Spouse: MazishiI
- Children: 4 children

Daudi Mwangosi (ca. 1972—September 2, 2012), was a Tanzanian television journalist for private Channel Ten, whom was killed in Nyololo village, Mufindi District, Iringa Region, Tanzania, during a demonstration by supporters of Chadema, the nation's opposition party.

== Personal ==
Daudi Mwangosi was forty years old when he was the victim of a protest-related killing in the Nyololo village. Mwangosi was married to Mazishil, and the couple had four children. He was buried in Busoka village in Rungwe District, Mbeya Region.

== Career ==
Daudi Mwangosi started his journalism career in 2005. Mwangosi was a television journalist for Channel Ten, which is a private television station. In 2011 he was elected chairman of the Iringa Press Club in the southern city of Iringa.

== Death ==
Nyololo is located outside of Iringa, Tanzania. It is shown here relative to the capital city of Dodoma.

On 2 September 2012, Daudi Mwangosi, a Channel Ten reporter, was killed in the Nyololo village while reporting on the opening of a branch office of the Chadema (Party for Democracy and Progress), the nation's opposition political party. Reports indicate the clashes began after police ordered supporters of the opposition party, who had gathered for a rally, to disperse. When the supporters refused, this prompted police to resort to violence, since a gathering was declared illegal. During the moments leading up to Mwangosi's death, he was observing supporters of the opposition party Chadema react to dispersion. An altercation with the police occurred when police attempted to detain another journalist Godfrey Mushi, who was with the Nipashe newspaper. The police fired a tear gas canister into Mwangosi's stomach at close range. He was killed by the police officer Pasificus Saimon. Four years after the killing, Saimon was sentenced to serve fifteen years in prison.

== Context ==
A United States Department of State report on the human rights conditions in the United Republic of Tanzania revealed three problem areas, including the "excessive use of force by security." During the year there were several reports that the government committed unlawful killings.

The week before Mwangosi was killed, police had already killed a Chadema supporter on August 27 in Morogoro, Morogoro Region in eastern Tanzania using dispersion tactics against the crowd. Morogoro was killed during the polices's diffusing of the Chadema supporters.

== Impact ==
Although Daudi Mwangosi's death was the first journalism work-related fatality documented by Committee to Protect Journalists in Tanzania since 1992, he was the second person to die in the conflicts between Tanzania's police force and the opposition Chadema party, and his killing was the first of several attacks on journalists and the media. Newspaper reporter Shaaban Matutu of Free Media Limited was injured by gunshot in December, and the Chairman of the Tanzania Editors’ Forum was attacked several months later. In January, one radio reporter, Issa Ngumba, was murdered, while another went missing.

== Reactions ==
Irina Bokova, director-general of UNESCO, said, "I am deeply concerned by the killing of Daudi Mwangosi and call on the authorities to investigate his death and bring those responsible to justice. It is essential for democracy and rule of law that journalists be allowed to carry out their duties and exercise their right to free speech safely."

General secretary of the International Federation of Journalists said, "We are deeply shocked by this killing which robs a family and the profession of a decent man and a courageous journalist.The circumstances surrounding his death indicate that foul play by Police should not be ruled out. That is why we urge the authorities to leave no stone unturned in finding out why yet again a journalist had to lose his life doing his work."

A spokesperson from the Committee to Protect Journalists said, "We condemn the killing of Daudi Mwangosi, who witnesses say lost his life while defending a fellow reporter at a news event. Preliminary statements show police have pre-judged this case, but with the abundance of photographic evidence and eyewitness testimony, we expect the Tanzanian government to set aside such preconceptions, undertake an immediate, independent investigation, and bring the perpetrators to justice."

The secretary-general for the Tanzania Editors' Forum said, "It was a deliberate move by the police, who clearly targeted this journalist. Eyewitnesses said the journalist was surrounded by police, beaten up and brutally killed. Police fired a tear gas shell into Daudi's stomach at close range.Photos of fragments of Daudi's blown-up body hit the Internet less than one hour after the incident. We believe that the police are deliberately targeting journalists in a violent crackdown."

An editorial appeared in Tanzania's The Guardian: "It is unacceptable for the government and the public to rely on police investigations, knowing only too well that they are in this case one of the parties being blamed for the death of our colleague."

== Daudi Mwangosi Award ==
Daudi Mwangosi after his death has had an award named after him. This award was created by the Union of Tanzania Press Club to promote ethical journalism in Tanzania. The recipient of the award must be someone who has endured an untold tribulation, not to long after Mwangosi's sudden unfortunate departure. The Heroic Journalism and Servanthood Excellence Award is the first one to be created by the UTPC.

== See also ==
- Human rights in Tanzania
