= Isaya Mwita Charles =

Tanzanian politician (born 1974)

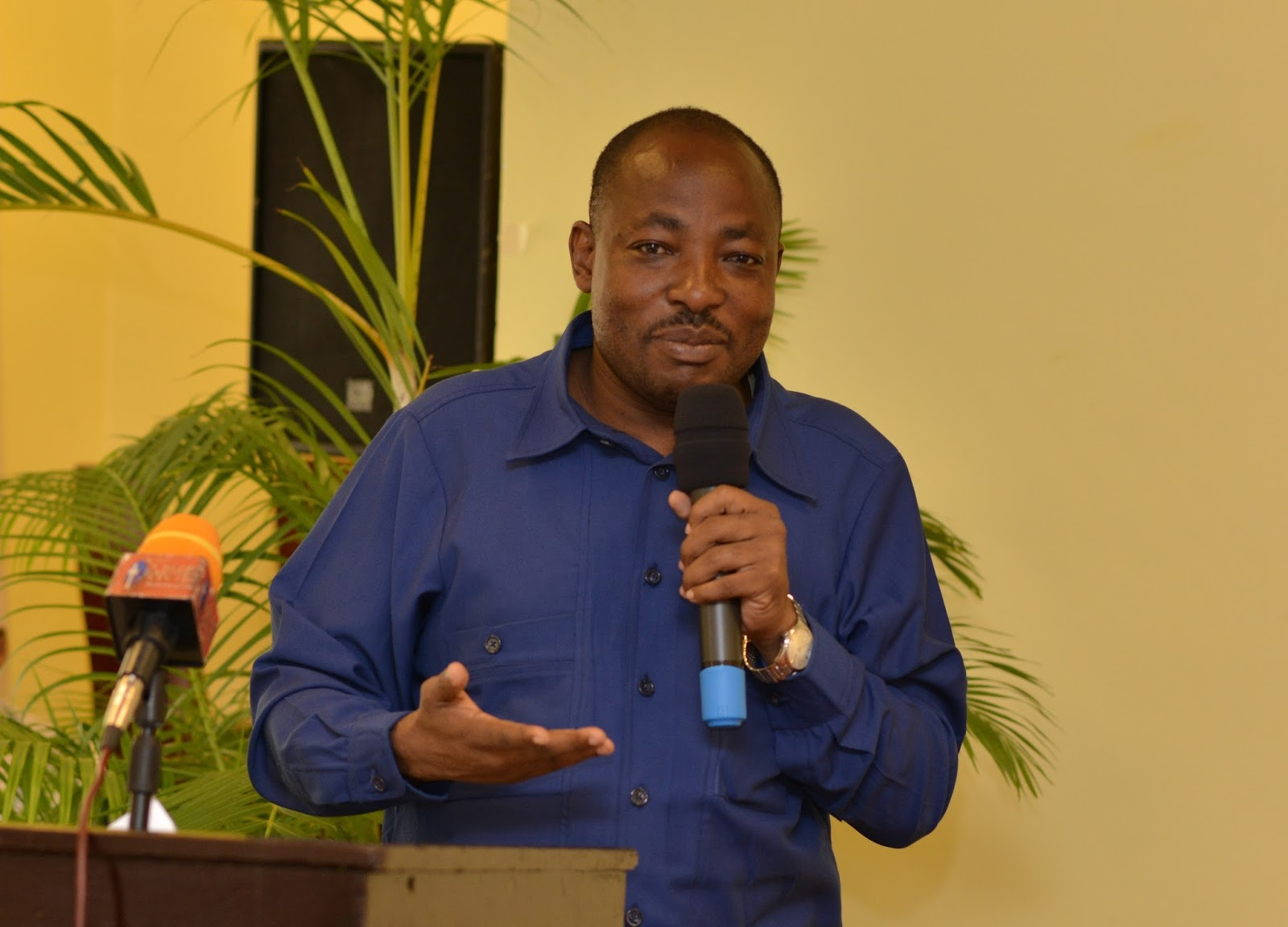
- Lord Charles Isaya Mwita
- Born: 28 February 1974 (age 52); Tarime, Mara, Tanzania
- Education: The Mwalimu Julius K. Nyerere University of Agriculture and Technology

Isaya Mwita Charles (born 28 February 1974) is a Tanzanian politician, who served as the Mayor of Dar es Salaam from 2016 to 2020.

== Early life and education ==
Isaya Mwita Charles was born in Tarime District, Mara Region, then part of the former Muso.

He obtained his Certificate of Secondary Education (CSE) from Tarime Secondary School in 1997. He attended Al Haramain Secondary School (July 2005–May 2007), where he earned the Advanced Certificate of Secondary Education (ACSE). From October 2008 to June 2011, he earned a bachelor's degree in economics from the Mwalimu Nyerere Memorial Academy.

Prior to entering politics, he worked as an economist at the Temeke Municipal Council and managed a printing enterprise in Kariakoo.

== Political career ==
Isaya Mwita Charles was first elected as a councillor for the Vijibweni ward of Dar es Salaam in 2015 as a representative of the CHADEMA party. On March 22, 2016, he was elected Mayor of Dar es Salaam City Council. During his tenure as mayor, he identified his principal priorities as the alleviation of traffic congestion and the expansion of the Bus Rapid Transit (BRT) system.
