= Timeline of Dar es Salaam =

Coordinates: 6.8°S 39.283333°E

The following is a timeline of the history of the city of Dar es Salaam, Tanzania.

== Prior to 20th century ==
- 1862 – Town founded by Majid bin Said of Zanzibar near Mzizima village.
- 1872 – Hurricane.
- 1887
  - Town "taken by Carl Peters for German East Africa Company."
  - Lutheran Mission built.
  - Catholic diocese of Southern Zanguebar established.
- 1891 – Capital of German East Africa relocated to Dar es Salaam from Bagamoyo.
- 1893 – Dar es Salaam Botanical Gardens established.
- 1894 – Lighthouse built.
- 1897 – Ocean Road Hospital built.
- 1899 – Deutsch-Ostafrikanische Zeitung (newspaper) begins publication.
- 1900 – "Port facilities" built.

== 20th century ==
=== 1900s-1950s ===
- 1901 - Lutheran Church built.
- 1903 - New Boma (district office) built.
- 1905
  - Baugesellschaft Daressalam (construction firm) in business.
  - St. Joseph's Cathedral consecrated.
- 1906 – Kaiserhof (hotel) in business.
- 1907 – Morogoro-Dar es Salaam railway built.
- 1911 – Post office built.
- 1914 – Kigoma-Dar es Salaam railway begins operating.
- 1916 – 3 September: Town captured by British forces.
- 1919 - Town becomes capital of British Tanganyika Territory.
- 1922 – State House built.
- 1926 – Legislative Council of Tanzania headquartered in Dar es Salaam.
- 1929 – Tanganyika African Association active.
- 1930 - Daily News begins publication.
- 1931 – Sudanese Association formed.
- 1933 - Yacht Club opens.
- 1936 - New Wanyamwezi Association founded.
- 1938 – Wazaramo Union founded.
- 1940 - George V Memorial Museum opens.
- 1945 - Township ward council instituted.
- 1948 - Population: 69,227.
- 1953 – Metropolitan Catholic Archdiocese of Dar-es-Salaam established.
- 1954 – Tanganyika African National Union headquartered in Dar es Salaam.

=== 1960s–1990s ===
- 1960 – Population: 74,036.
- 1961
  - City becomes capital of Tanganyika.
  - University College and Alliance Française de Dar es Salaam established.
- 1963 – Tanzania Library Services headquartered in city.
- 1964
  - City becomes capital of the United Republic of Tanganyika and Zanzibar.
  - Aga Khan Hospital, Dar es Salaam established.
- 1965
  - Radio Tanzania Dar es Salaam active.
  - Bank of Tanzania headquarters and Kilimanjaro Hotel built.
  - Public library opens.
- 1966
  - Oil refinery begins operating.
  - TANU Youth League Centre opens.
- 1967 - Aga Khan Mzizima Secondary School built.
- 1968 – Tazama oil pipeline begins operating.
- 1970 – University of Dar es Salaam established.
- 1975
  - TAZARA Railway begins operating.
  - Population: 517,000.
- 1977 – October: Chama Cha Mapinduzi (political party) convenes in city.
- 1978 – Mlimani Park Orchestra formed.
- 1979 – Airport expanded.
- 1985 – Population: 1,046,000 (urban agglomeration).
- 1990 – Population: 1,316,000 (urban agglomeration).
- 1991 – Mkuki na Nyota publisher in business.
- 1992 – "Sustainable Dar es Salaam Program" introduced.
- 1993
  - Mawingu Studio established.
  - Aga Khan Primary School opens.
- 1995
  - International Medical and Technological University established.
  - Doctor's strike.
  - Population: 1,668,000 (urban agglomeration).
- 1996 – National Assembly of Tanzania relocated from Dar es Salaam to Dodoma.
- 1997
  - Dar es Salaam Institute of Technology established.
  - New Africa Hotel built.
- 1998 – 7 August: United States embassy bombing.
- 2000
  - Fish market built.
  - Population: 2,116,000 (urban agglomeration).

== 21st century ==
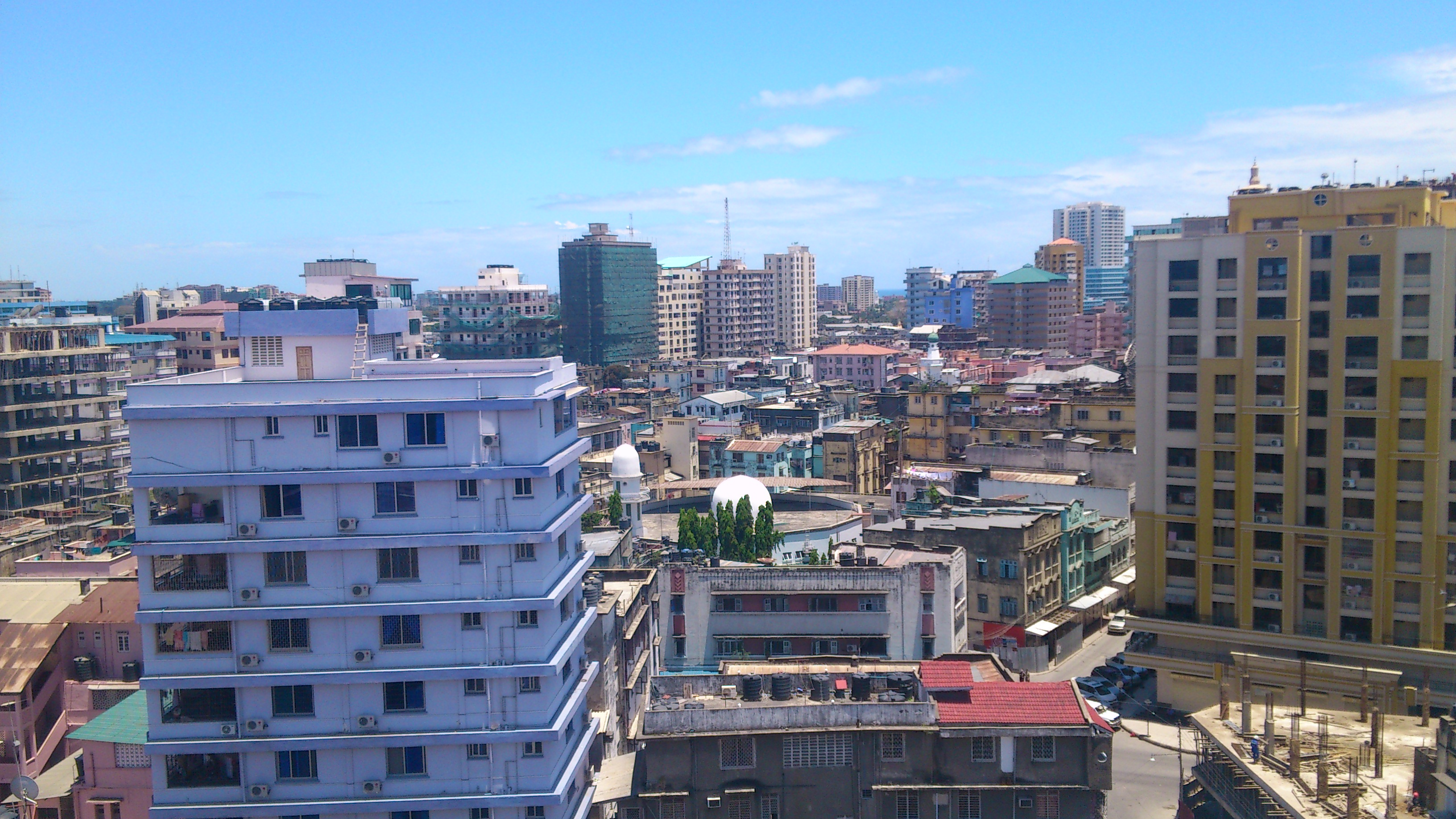
Dar es Salaam, 2012

- 2001
  - April: Political demonstration.
  - African Stars Entertainment in business.
- 2002 – National Records and Archives Management Department headquartered in city.
- 2005 – Population: 2,683,000 (urban agglomeration).
- 2006 – Adam Kimbisa becomes mayor.
- 2010
  - Didas Massaburi becomes mayor.
  - May: World Economic Forum on Africa held.
  - Population: 3,415,000 (urban agglomeration).
- 2011 - December: Flood.
- 2012
  - October: Muslim-Christian unrest.
  - Population: 4,364,541 metro.
- 2013 - 29 March: Building collapse on Indira Gandhi Street.
- 2018 – Population: 5,147,070 (estimate).
- 2021 – Shooting.

== See also ==
- Dar es Salaam history
- List of mayors of Dar es Salaam
- Districts of Dar es Salaam Region
- Timelines of other cities in Tanzania: Zanzibar City
- Timeline of Tanzanian history

== Bibliography ==
Published in 20th century

- Lothaire Loewenbach (1908), "De Zanzibar a Dar-es-Salam", Promenade autour de l'Afrique, 1907: Syrie, Palestine, Eǵypte, Soudan, Transvaal, Rhodésie, Le Cap, Saint-Héléne (in French), Paris: E. Flammarion
- "Dar es Salaam". Brockhaus' Konversations-Lexikon (in German) (14th ed.). Leipzig: Brockhaus. 1908.
- "Daressalam". Deutsches Kolonial-Lexikon (in German). 1920 – via Universitätsbibliothek Frankfurt.
- "Dar es Salaam District". Red Book 1922–23: Handbook and Directory for Kenya Colony and Protectorate, Uganda Protectorate, Tanganyika Territory, and Zanzibar Sultanate. Nairobi: East Africa Standard Ltd. 1922.
- Clement Gillman (1945). "Dar es Salaam 1860–1940: A Story of Growth and Change". Tanganyika Notes and Records. 20. ISSN 0856-2725.
- John E.G. Sutton (1970). "Dar es Salaam, A Sketch of a Hundred Years". Tanganyika Notes and Records. 71.
- John E.G. Sutton (1970). Dar es Salaam: City, Port, and Region.
- B.S. Hoyle (1978). "African Politics and Port Expansion at Dar es Salaam". Geographical Review. 68 (1): 31–50. doi:10.2307/213509. JSTOR 213509.
- Marshall Macklin Monoghan (1978), Dar es Salaam Masterplan, Toronto
- Deborah F. Bryceson (1987). "A Century of Food Supply in Dar es Salaam". In Jane I. Guyer (ed.). Feeding African Cities: Studies in Regional Social History. UK: Manchester University Press. ISBN 0719022142.
- Jurgen Becher (1997). Dar es Salaam, Tanga und Tabora: Stadtentwicklung in Tansania unter deutscher Kolonialherrschaft, 1885-1914 (in German). Stuttgart.
- Laura Sykes; Uma Waide (1997). Dar es Salaam: a dozen drives around the city. Mkuki Na Nyota Publishers. ISBN 9976973357.
- Mary Fitzpatrick (1999), "Dar es Salaam", Tanzania, Zanzibar & Pemba, Lonely Planet, p. 122+, OL 8314875M

Published in 21st century

- R. Mhamba; C. Titus (2001). "Reactions to Deteriorating Provision of Public Services in Dar es Salaam". In Arne Tostensen; et al. (eds.). Associational Life in African Cities: Popular Responses to the Urban Crisis. Sweden: Nordiska Afrikainstitutet. ISBN 978-91-7106-465-3.
- Brian Hoyle (2002). "Port-City Renewal in Developing Countries the Waterfront at Dar Es Salaam, Tanzania". Erdkunde. 56. ISSN 0014-0015.
- Paul Tiyambe Zeleza; Dickson Eyoh, eds. (2003). "Dar es Salaam, Tanzania". Encyclopedia of Twentieth-Century African History. Routledge. ISBN 0415234794.
- Kwame Anthony Appiah and Henry Louis Gates, ed. (2005). "Dar es Salaam". Africana: The Encyclopedia of the African and African American Experience (2nd ed.). Oxford University Press. p. 318+. ISBN 978-0-19-517055-9.
- Kevin Shillington, ed. (2005). "Dar es Salaam". Encyclopedia of African History. Fitzroy Dearborn. ISBN 978-1-57958-245-6.
- James R. Brennan (2006). "Youth, the TANU Youth League and Managed Vigilantism in Dar es Salaam, Tanzania, 1925-73". Africa: Journal of the International African Institute. 76 (2): 221–246. doi:10.3366/afr.2006.76.2.221. JSTOR 40027110. S2CID 145681258.
- James R. Brennan; et al., eds. (2007). Dar es Salaam: Histories from an Emerging African Metropolis. African Books Collective. ISBN 978-9987449705.
- Andrew Burton (2007). "Haven of Peace Purged: Tackling the Undesirable and Unproductive Poor in Dar es Salaam, ca.1950s-1980s". International Journal of African Historical Studies. 40 (1): 119–151. JSTOR 40034793.
- Steven Fabian (2007). "Curing the Cancer of the Colony: Bagamoyo, Dar es Salaam, and Socioeconomic Struggle in German East Africa". International Journal of African Historical Studies. 40 (3): 441–469. JSTOR 40034038.
- Creole and Tribal Designs: Dar es Salaam and Kampala as Ethnic Cities in Coalescing Nation States, London: Crisis States Research Centre, 2008 – via International Relations and Security Network
- Philip Briggs (2009). "Dar es Salaam". Tanzania. Bradt Travel Guides. ISBN 978-1-84162-288-0.
- Overview of Municipal Finance Systems in Dar-Es-Salaam, Tanzania, London: Crisis States Research Centre, 2009 – via International Relations and Security Network
- Alex Perullo (2011), Live from Dar es Salaam: popular music and Tanzania's music economy, Bloomington: Indiana University Press, ISBN 9780253356055
