= Malangali, Mufindi =

Ward in Mufindi, Iringa, Tanzania

Malangali Kata ya Malangali
- Ward
- Location within Tanzania
- Coordinates: 8.56453567°S 34.85089803°E
- Country: Tanzania
- Region: Iringa Region
- District: Mufindi District
- Ward: Malangali

Population (2016)
  - Total: 6,120
- Time zone: UTC+3 (EAT)

Malangali, Mufindi is an administrative ward in the Mufindi District of the Iringa Region of Tanzania, East Africa. In 2016 the Tanzania National Bureau of Statistics report there were 6,120 people in the ward, from 5,849 in 2012.

== See also ==
- Malangali Secondary School
