= Leonard Levitt =

American journalist and author (1941–2020)

- Born: Leonard Hugh Levitt; April 27, 1941; The Bronx, New York City, United States
- Died: May 18, 2020 (aged 79); Stamford, Connecticut, United States
- Education: Dartmouth College
- Spouse: Susan (m. 1974)
- Children: 2

Leonard Hugh Levitt (April 27, 1941 – May 18, 2020) was an American author known for his books about crime and the New York City Police Department. He was an Edgar Award winner and worked as a Peace Corps teacher in Tanzania in the early and mid-1960s. He was also the author of An African Season about his experiences in Tanzania and as a teacher. It was the first book ever written by a Peace Corps volunteer.

== Early life ==
Levitt was born in The Bronx, New York City, on April 27, 1941. His father, Boris, operated a business dealing with import/export; his mother, Celia (Kossovsky), was an English teacher at Hunter College. He grew up in the Five Towns area on Long Island. He graduated from Lawrence Woodmere Academy and went on to study at Dartmouth College, obtaining a bachelor's degree from that institution in 1963.

Levitt subsequently joined the Peace Corps and spent two years in Tanzania teaching English. One of his students at Mpuguso Middle School in Rungwe District, Southern Highlands Province, was Godfrey Mwakikagile who became an African studies scholar and author of many non-fiction books on African history, economics, and politics. Levitt also taught Oscar Mwamwaja, one of Tanzania's first commercial airline pilots who survived an Air Tanzania hijacking on February 26, 1982, during which he was forced to fly from Tanzania to Britain, according to reports, "Hijacked Jetliner Arrives in Britain," The New York Times, 28 February 1982, and "4 Tanzanian Hijackers Surrender; 90 Hostages Are Freed in Britain," The New York Times, 1 March 1982. Levitt wrote about his experiences as a teacher in Tanzania in the article "Tanzania: A Dream Deferred", as well as the book An African Season.. The latter was the first book to be written by a member of the Peace Corps.

In his book, Africa: Dawn of a New Era, Godfrey Mwakikagile stated the following about Leonard Levitt:

“I remember very well what one of our first Peace Corp teachers said when he introduced himself to us in class at Mpuguso Middle School in Rungwe District in the Southern Highlands one morning in the early part of 1964 when I was in standard eight, what Americans call the eighth grade. He said: 'My name is Leonard Levitt. I am a Jew from New York City.'” - (Godfrey Mwakikagile, Africa: Dawn of a New Era, New Africa Press, 2015, p. 314).

== Career ==
After graduating from the Columbia University Graduate School of Journalism, Levitt was first hired by the Long Island Press to be their sportswriter on a part-time basis. He was later employed by the Associated Press, The Detroit News, and Time. In 1975, he began working for Newsday, first as a beat reporter writing about police on Long Island, and later for the paper's New York edition.

Levitt's most notable article came in 1991, in which he and Kevin Donovan wrote about the 1975 murder of Martha Moxley. The two reporters read through approximately 400 pages of police documents and over 100 interviews. They concluded that the local police had acquiesced to the Skakel family, who were related to the Kennedy family through marriage. The report prompted authorities to reopen its investigation and press charges against Michael Skakel for murder. Although Skakel was convicted of murdering Moxley in 2002, he was freed in 2013 and had his conviction quashed in 2018, after an appeals court found that he had not been given effective assistance of counsel.

Levitt left the New York edition of Newsday when the paper shut down in 2005. He launched his own blog called "NYPD Confidential", which was a continuation of his Newsday column "One Police Plaza" that he started a decade earlier. The New York City Police Department proceeded to revoke his press pass and prohibited him from entering the Department's headquarters, claiming that he was no longer licensed to possess credentials. However, he eventually regained these with the assistance of the New York Civil Liberties Union.

The book detailing his investigation of the Moxley case, Conviction: Solving the Moxley Murder, which Levitt co-wrote with Frank Garr (the lead investigator for the prosecution), won the Edgar Award in 2005 for best non-fiction.

== Personal life ==
Levitt was married to Susan (née Gina) for 46 years. Together, they had a son (Michael) and a daughter (Jennifer).

Levitt died on May 18, 2020, at his home in Stamford, Connecticut. He was 79, and had been suffering from lung cancer in the two years leading up to his death. News of his death was first announced by his daughter.

== Published books ==
- An African Season, Simon and Schuster, 1967
- The Long Way Round (1972)
- The Healer: A True Story of Medicine and Murder (1980)
- Conviction: Solving the Moxley Murder: A Reporter and a Detective's Twenty-Year Search for Justice (2004)
- NYPD Confidential: Power and Corruption in the Country's Greatest Police Force (2009)
