= Amir Abedi =

Tanzanian politician (1924–1964)

- Born: 1924
- Died: 1964 (aged 39–40)
- Known for: First African mayor of Dar es Salaam

Sheikh K. A. Amir Abedi (1924–1964) was the first African mayor of Dar es Salaam.

He served as a Minister of Justice and as Minister of Education and Culture, as well as led the Tanganyikan delegation to the Eighteenth Session of the United Nations General Assembly.

== Death ==
Abedi was also a skilled and prominent poet of the Swahili language and also a strong promoter of the Swahili language. He died of food poisoning in 1964 at the age of 40.

== See also ==
- List of mayors of Dar es Salaam
- Timeline of Dar es Salaam
