= Jeremiah Kasambala =

Tanzanian politician

Jeremiah Sam Kasambala (1925-1984) was one of the first ministers in the cabinet of Julius Nyerere after Tanganyika (now part of Tanzania) won independence from Britain on 9 December 1961. He rose to prominence when he was the head of the Rungwe African Cooperative Union in Rungwe District in the Southern Highlands Province.

The Rungwe African Cooperative Union Ltd, successor to the Mwakaleli Coffee Growers Cooperative Society was one of the largest farmers' unions in the country. Like the other agricultural cooperatives, it played a major role in mobilising its members and other people in the 1950s to support the struggle for independence which was led by the Tanganyika African National Union (TANU).

TANU was the largest political party in the country. It was formed in Dar es Salaam, the colonial capital of Tanganyika, on 7 July 1954. Nyerere was elected president of TANU.

During the sixties, Kasambala served in different capacities in the government under President Nyerere, including being minister of trade and cooperatives, a portfolio that reflected his background as a leader of the cooperative union in Rungwe District; and minister of industries, minerals and energy among other posts.
