= Makwaia wa Kuhenga =

Tanzanian columnist and TV presenter

- Education: University of Wales, Cardiff (MA)
- Occupations: Author, columnist and TV presenter
- Television: Shall We Make it? / Je, Tutafika?
- Website: www.makwaia.com

Makwaia wa Kuhenga is a Tanzanian columnist, author and a television presenter.

== Early life and career ==
In 1991, he graduated from the University of Wales in Cardiff with an MA in journalism.

== Publications ==
- Kumbe mke huyu mchawi: matukio ya kweli [Alas The Wife is A Witch: true story] (in Swahili). Je, Tutafika? Publications. 2005. ISBN 9789987905270.
- CCM na mustakabali wa nchi yetu [CCM and the future of our country] (in Swahili). Je, Tutafika? Publications. 2007. ISBN 9789987905263.
