= Mayor of Dar es Salaam =

Chairperson of Tanzania's largest city

Lord Mayor of Dar es Salaam
- Incumbent; Nurdin Bilal Juma (Shetta) since 6 December 2025
- Appointer: Electorate of Dar es Salaam (City Councillors)
- Term length: Five years
- Deputy: Deputy Mayor of Dar es Salaam
- Salary: Tshs
- Website: Dar es Salaam City Council

The Lord Mayor of Dar es Salaam is the ceremonial head and chairperson of the Dar es Salaam City Council, the governing authority of Dar es Salaam, Tanzania’s largest city and principal economic centre. The Lord Mayor serves as the city’s first citizen and civic representative, presiding over council meetings, representing the city at official functions, and working in collaboration with councillors and the City Director to promote urban development and public welfare.

The Lord Mayor is elected by members of the City Council from among the councillors, in accordance with local government legislation. The council represents not fewer than 92 wards within Dar es Salaam. The term of office is five years and follows the national local government election calendar as determined by the ministry responsible for local government. At the same time, the council also elects a Deputy Mayor to assist in carrying out civic duties.

The current Lord Mayor is Nurdin Bilal Juma (Shetta), who assumed office on 6 December 2025. He succeeded the late Omary Said Kumbilamoto, who served as Lord Mayor from 2020 to 2025.

The official office of the Lord Mayor is located at the Karimjee Compound in Dar es Salaam, which serves as the administrative and ceremonial seat of the mayoralty during the holder’s term of office.

== List of mayors ==
Below is a list of individuals who have served as mayors of Dar es Salaam since the establishment of the position in 1949.

List of mayors of Dar es Salaam
No	Portrait	Name	Term start	Term end	Notes
1		P. Overett OBE	1949	1950	First Mayor of Dar es Salaam
2		Abdul Karim A. J. Karimjee	1951	1957	
3		T. W. Tyreel	1955	1956	
4		S. D. Howarth	1958	1958	
5		Manilal Mathuradas Dewani	1959	1959	
6		Amir Abedi	1960	1961	First African Mayor
7		M. Mfaume	1962	1963	
8		R. O. Kirundu	1964	1966	
9		O. O. Londo	1967	1967	
10		A. Chambuso	1967	1974	
11		Ramadhan Nyamka	1978	1982	
12		Kitwana Kondo	1983	1995	
13		Abuu H. Jumaa	1996	2000	
14		Kleist Sykes	2000	2005	
15		Adam Omary Kimbisa	2006	2010	
16		Didas J. Masaburi	2010	2015	
17		Isaya Mwita Charles	2016	2020	
18		Omary Said Kumbilamoto	2020	2025	
19		Nurdin Bilal Juma	2025	Incumbent	
