= Pan-African Freedom Movement for East and Central Africa =

The Pan-African Freedom Movement of East and Central Africa (PAFMECA), later renamed the Pan-African Freedom Movement of East, Central and Southern Africa (PAFMECSA) was a political and Pan-Africanist organisation that was formed to campaign for the independence of the countries of East and Central Africa (and later Southern Africa) from colonial and white minority rule. The organisation was formed at a conference held in Mwanza, Tanganyika, from 16 to 18 September 1958. Julius Nyerere (later President of Tanzania) and Tom Mboya the Kenyan Pan-Africanist and trade unionist were among the founders. Nyerere came up with the idea for the conference. PAFMECSA was disbanded on 25 September 1963.

== History ==
PAFMECA was formed in the town of Mwanza on the shores of Lake Victoria in northern Tanganyika under the leadership of Julius Nyerere. Nyerere was the leader of the Tanganyika African National Union (TANU), the party that campaigned for the independence of Tanganyika.

He called a meeting of the representatives of the nationalist parties in the region which was held in Mwanza from 16 – 18 September 1958. It was attended by representatives of political parties from Kenya, Uganda, Zanzibar, Nyasaland and Tanganyika to mobilise forces and coordinate their efforts in pursuit of independence and PAFMECA was born.

One of the main subjects discussed was the existence of the colonial Federation of Rhodesia and Nyasaland, also known as the Central African Federation (composed of Nyasaland, Northern Rhodesia and Southern Rhodesia), in the context of the African liberation struggle.

The leaders feared that the continued existence of the white-dominated federation would perpetuate imperial domination of the region and lead to the creation of another South Africa, which at the time was ruled under the Apartheid system.

At its fourth conference, held in Addis Abeba on 2-10 February 1962, the scope of the organisation was widened to Ethiopia, Somalia and Southern Africa, after which it was renamed PAFMECSA. A more serious approach to the problems of Central and Southern Africa led to it establishing the principle of equal rights of membership for governments and nationalist movements, abandoning earlier support for non-violence, and choosing Kenneth Kaunda as the first Chairman of PAFMECSA.

PAFMECSA was Pan-Africanist in outlook and played a major role in the formation of the Organisation of African Unity (OAU) in Addis Ababa, Ethiopia, in May 1963, which required regional organisations to disband. For PAFMECSA, this was carried out on 25 September 1963 by President Nyerere and Chairman Kaunda.
