= 1958–59 Tanganyikan general election =

Election of the Tanganyika African National Union to the Legislative Council

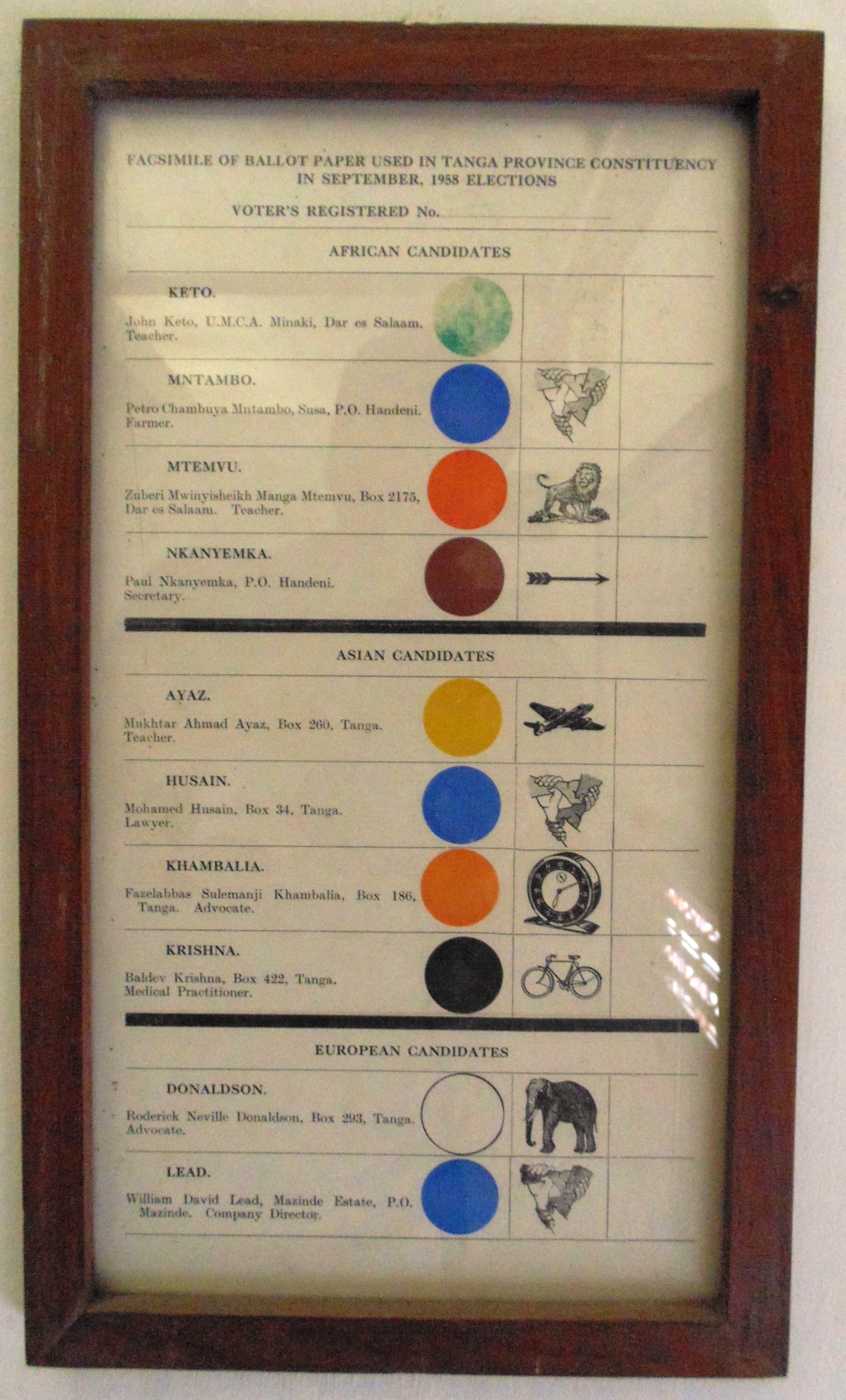
Ballot paper used in Tanga Province Constituency

General elections were held in Tanganyika in September 1958 and February 1959. Elections were held in five constituencies on 8 and 12 September 1958, and in the other five on 9 and 15 February 1959. The Tanganyika African National Union (TANU) and affiliated independents won all 30 elected seats in the Legislative Council.

== Campaign ==
Fifteen of the 30 elected seats were uncontested, all of which were won by the TANU. In each constituency, voters voted for an African, Asian and European candidate. A further 34 members were appointed.

== Results ==
Party	Votes	%	Seats
Tanganyika African National Union	46,895	68.52	30
United Tanganyika Party	6,909	10.10	0
African National Congress	53	0.08	0
Independents	14,581	21.31	0
Appointed members			34
Total	68,438	100.00	64
Total votes	32,532	–	
Registered voters/turnout	40,606	80.12	
Source: Tanganyika Gazette, Barongo, Mwaga

=== By constituency ===
Constituency		Candidate	Party	Votes	Notes
Central Province	Africans	Mwalimu Kihere	Tanganyika African National Union	–	Elected unopposed
Central Province	Asians	Al Noor Kassum	Independent (TANU)	–	Elected unopposed
Central Province	Europeans	Horace Wellesley Hannah	Independent (TANU)	–	Elected unopposed
Dar es Salaam	Africans	Rashidi Kawawa	Tanganyika African National Union	–	Elected unopposed
Dar es Salaam	Asians	Kantilal Jhaveri	Independent (TANU)	4,281	Elected
Dar es Salaam	Asians	G.M. Daya	Independent	2,023	
Dar es Salaam	Europeans	D.F. Heath	Independent (TANU)	4,869	Elected
Dar es Salaam	Europeans	Tom Tyrell	Independent	1,434	
Eastern Province	Africans	Julius Nyerere	Tanganyika African National Union	2,628	Elected
Eastern Province	Africans	Patrick Kunambi	Independent	802	
Eastern Province	Asians	Amir H. Jamal	Independent (TANU)	2,672	Elected
Eastern Province	Asians	Shivabhai Mithabhai Patel	Independent	601	
Eastern Province	Asians	Fazal Kassam Issa	Independent	157	
Eastern Province	Europeans	Graham Thomas Lewis	Independent (TANU)	–	Elected unopposed
Northern Province	Africans	Solomon Nkya Eliufoo	Tanganyika African National Union	3,348	Elected
Northern Province	Africans	Siwa Kundael George	Independent	1,275	
Northern Province	Asians	Sophia Mustafa	Independent (TANU)	2,248	Elected
Northern Province	Asians	Hassanali Kassam Virani	Independent	864	
Northern Province	Asians	Mohamedali Sharif	Independent	682	
Northern Province	Asians	Narshidas Mathuradas Mehta	Independent	660	
Northern Province	Asians	Dharampal Behal	Independent	169	
Northern Province	Europeans	Derek Noel Maclean Bryceson	Independent (TANU)	3,300	Elected
Northern Province	Europeans	John Michael Hunter	Independent	1,323	
South-East Lake	Africans	Paul Bomani	Tanganyika African National Union	–	Elected unopposed
South-East Lake	Asians	C.K. Patel	Independent (TANU)	–	Elected unopposed
South-East Lake	Europeans	J.S. Mann	Independent (TANU)	–	Elected unopposed
Southern Highlands Province	Africans	John Mwakangale	Tanganyika African National Union	2,682	Elected
Southern Highlands Province	Africans	Timothy Sankey	United Tanganyika Party	694	
Southern Highlands Province	Africans	Ferdinand Ugulumu	Independent	420	
Southern Highlands Province	Africans	Warte Bertie Mwanjisi	Independent	120	
Southern Highlands Province	Asians	Arjan Singh Bajaj	Independent (TANU)	2,744	Elected
Southern Highlands Province	Asians	Rehemtulla Karim Manji	Independent	1,172	
Southern Highlands Province	Europeans	Lady Marion Chesham	Independent (TANU)	2,962	Elected
Southern Highlands Province	Europeans	Ivor Cresswell Bayldon	United Tanganyika Party	954	
Southern Province	Africans	Lawi Sijaona	Tanganyika African National Union	–	Elected unopposed
Southern Province	Asians	S.T. Thanki	Independent (TANU)	2,243	Elected
Southern Province	Asians	M.H. Versi	Independent	900	
Southern Province	Europeans	Leader Stirling	Independent (TANU)	–	Elected unopposed
Tanga	Africans	John Keto	Tanganyika African National Union	3,455	Elected
Tanga	Africans	Petro Chambuya Mntambo	United Tanganyika Party	1,854	
Tanga	Africans	Zuberi Mwinyisheikh Mtemvu	African National Congress	53	
Tanga	Africans	Paul Nkanyemka	Independent	49	
Tanga	Asians	Krishna Beldev	Independent (TANU)	3,550	Elected
Tanga	Asians	Mohamed Hussain	United Tanganyika Party	1,435	
Tanga	Asians	Fazelabbas Sylemanji Khambalia	Independent	350	
Tanga	Asians	Mukhtar Ahmed Ayaz	Independent	76	
Tanga	Europeans	Roderick Donaldson	Independent (TANU)	3,439	Elected
Tanga	Europeans	David Lead	United Tanganyika Party	1,972	
West Lake	Africans	George Kahama	Tanganyika African National Union	–	Elected unopposed
West Lake	Asians	N.K. Laxman	Independent (TANU)	–	Elected unopposed
West Lake	Europeans	Barbro Johansson	Independent (TANU)	–	Elected unopposed
Western Province	Africans	Abdalla Fundikira	Tanganyika African National Union	–	Elected unopposed
Western Province	Asians	Mahmud Nasser Rattansey	Independent (TANU)	2,474	Elected
Western Province	Asians	Lutaf Ali Bhatia	Independent	1,056	
Western Province	Asians	Natwarlal Ambalal Patel	Independent	235	
Western Province	Asians	Purshottam Rambhai Patel	Independent	213	
Western Province	Europeans	John Harvey Baker	Independent (TANU)	–	Elected unopposed
Source: Tanganyika Gazette, Barongo, Mwaga

== Aftermath ==
In December 1959, the United Kingdom agreed to the establishment of internal self-government, after fresh elections the following year.
