= George Leach =

George Leach may refer to:

- George Leach (musician) (born 1975), Canadian musician and actor
- George Leach (cricketer) (1881–1945), English cricketer
- Sir George Leach (civil servant) (1820–1913), English civil servant
- George E. Leach (1876–1955), United States Army general and mayor of Minneapolis

== See also ==
- George Leech (disambiguation)
