= UTP =

UTP may refer to:

== Science and technology ==
- Uridine triphosphate, in biochemistry
- Untripentium, a hypothetical chemical element
- Unifying Theories of Programming, in computer science
- Unshielded twisted pair, a type of communications cable
- Micro Transport Protocol (μTP or uTP), a computer network protocol

== Education ==
- Universiti Teknologi Petronas, also known as Petronas University of Technology, located in Seri Iskandar, Perak, Malaysia
- Technological University of Panama (Universidad Tecnológica de Panamá)
- Universidade Tuiuti do Paraná, see List of universities in Brazil by state
- University of Tehran Press, Iran
- University of Toronto Press, Canada
- University Transition Program, a secondary school program in Canada

== Music ==
- UTP (group), an American rap group
- Under the Pink, the second album from singer/songwriter Tori Amos
- utp_ (album), a 2008 collaboration between Alva Noto, Ryuichi Sakamoto, and Ensemble Modern
- Unblessing the Purity, a 2008 death metal EP by Bloodbath

== Organisations ==
- United Tanganyika Party, a politician party in Tanganyika (now Tanzania) from 1956 to 1962
- United Tasmania Party, a political party, forerunner of the Australian Greens
- Urban Theatre Projects, an Australian theatre company

== Other uses ==
- Uptown Projects, New Orleans Public Housing
- Unassisted triple play, in baseball
- Unlisted Trading Privileges, oversees the Securities Information Processor for securities listed on Nasdaq
- U-Tapao International Airport (IATA airport code: UTP), Thailand
- Amba language (Solomon Islands) (ISO 639-3 code: utp)
