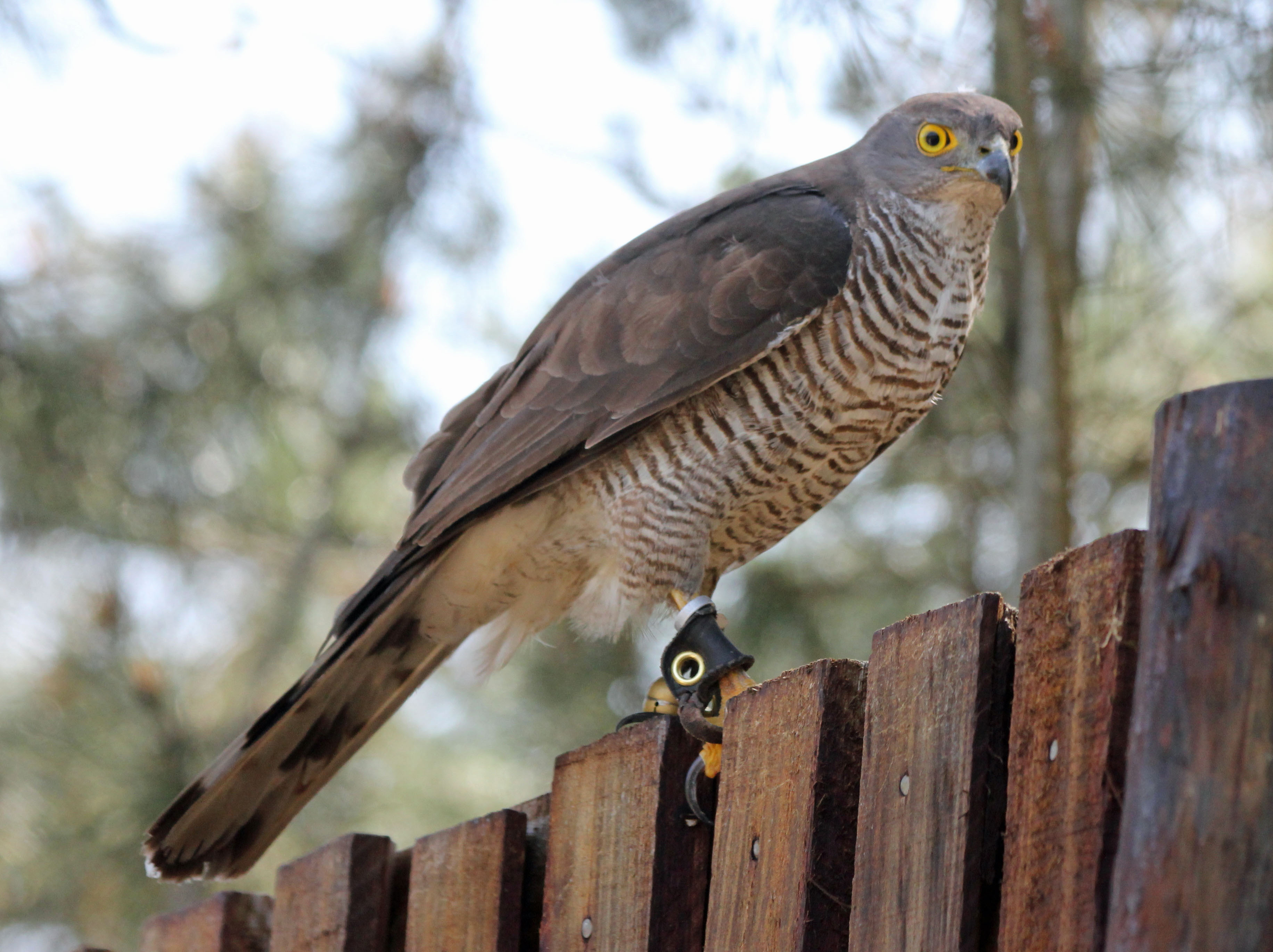
- Captive adult female
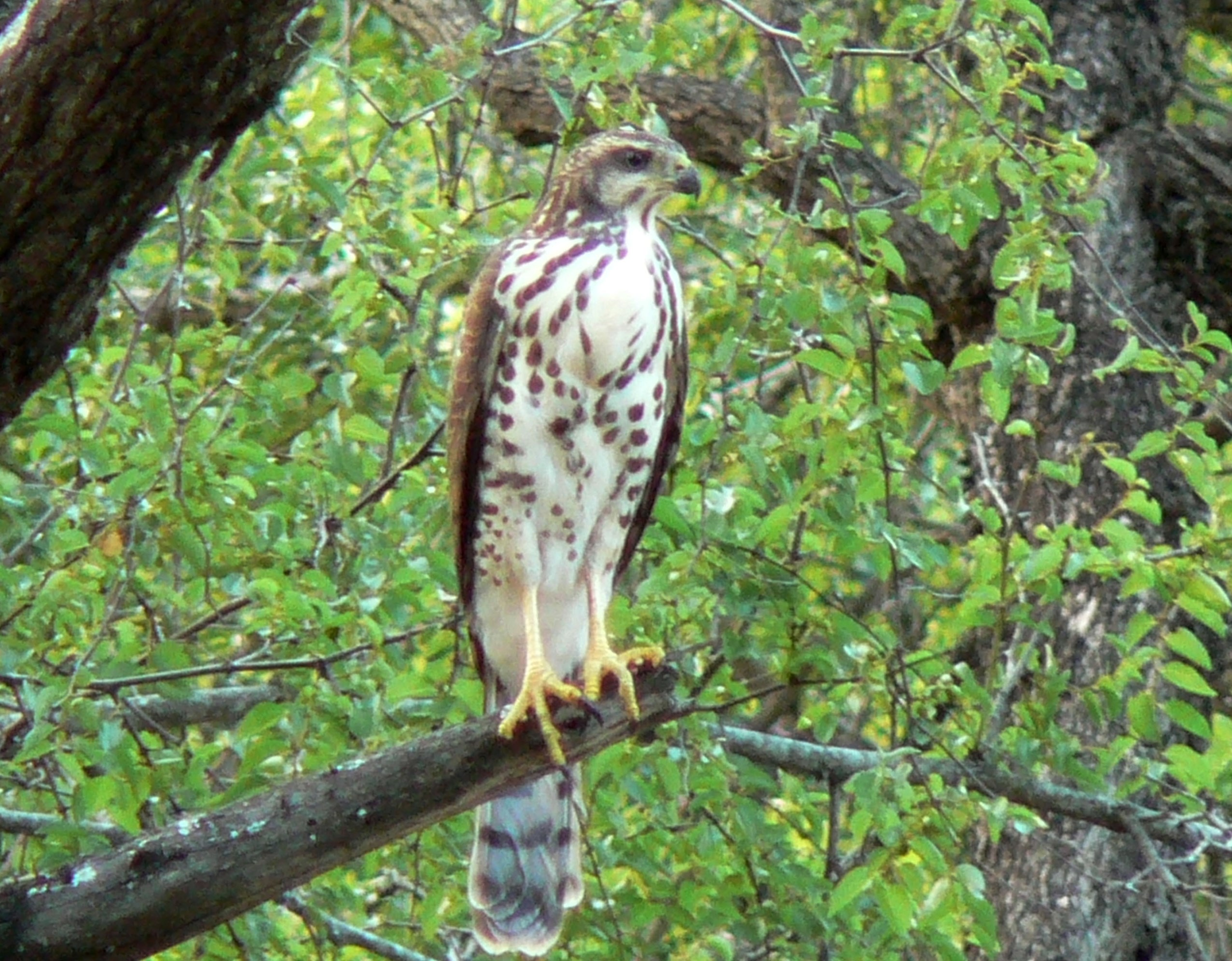
- immature female

Conservation status
- Least Concern (IUCN 3.1)

Scientific classification
- Kingdom: Animalia
- Phylum: Chordata
- Class: Aves
- Order: Accipitriformes
- Family: Accipitridae
- Genus: Aerospiza
- Species: A. tachiro

Binomial name
- Aerospiza tachiro (Daudin, 1800)

Synonyms
- Falco tachiro Daudin, 1800

= African goshawk =

Species of bird

The African goshawk (Aerospiza tachiro) is an African species of bird of prey in the genus Aerospiza. It was formerly placed in the genus Accipiter. The African goshawk was previously sometimes split with the red-chested goshawk (Aerospiza toussenelii) of west Africa treated as a separate species.

== Taxonomy ==
The African goshawk was formally described in 1800 by the French zoologist François Marie Daudin under the binomial name Falco tachiro. Daudin based his account on "Le Tachiro" that had been described and illustrated in 1799 by the French naturalist François Levaillant. His specimen had been collected near the town of Knysna, in Cape Province of South Africa. Levaillant coined the French name for the species by combining the French word tache meaning "spot" or "blotch" with rond meaning "round". The African goshawk was formerly placed in the genus Accipiter but a large molecular phylogenetic study published in 2024 found that this genus was polyphyletic. As part of the rearrangement to create monophyletic genera the African goshawk was moved together with the chestnut-flanked sparrowhawk to the resurrected genus Aerospiza that had been introduced in 1922 by the South African zoologist Austin Roberts.

Eight subspecies are recognised:

- A. t. macroscelides (Hartlaub, 1855) – Senegal and Gambia to west Cameroon (red-chested group)
- A. t. lopezi (Alexander, 1903) – Bioko (Gulf of Guinea) (red-chested group)
- A. t. toussenelii (Verreaux, J & Verreaux, É & Des Murs, 1855) – south Cameroon to north, west DR Congo (red-chested group)
- A. t. canescens (Chapin, 1921) – east DR Congo to west Uganda (red-chested group)
- A. t. unduliventer (Rüppell, 1836) – Eritrea and Ethiopia
- A. t. sparsimfasciata (Reichenow, 1895) – Somalia to Angola, Zambia and Mozambique
- A. t. pembaensis (Benson & Elliott, HFI, 1975) – Pemba Island (off Tanzania)
- A. t. tachiro (Daudin, 1800) – south Angola to Mozambique and South Africa

The red-chested goshawk (Aerospiza toussenelii) with subspecies macroscelides, lopezi, toussenelii and canescens, has sometimes been considered as a separate species.

== Description ==
The African goshawk is a medium to large-sized hawk which is mainly grey and rufous with the typical broad-winged and long-tailed shape of its genus. The adult has grey upperparts which tend to be darker in males than in females, the underparts are whitish marked with rufous barring which is more pronounced in males. The underwing is pale rufous, fading to white on some birds and the flight feathers and tail vary from sooty brown to grey with faint grey bars above, white with grey bars below. The bill is black, the cere is greenish-grey, the eyes are yellow, and the legs and feet are yellow. Juveniles are brown above with whitish unterparts and flanks which are boldly blotched with brown. Females weigh 270–510 g (9.5–18.0 oz), while the smaller males weigh 150–340 g (5.3–12.0 oz). The wingspan is 1.7 times the bird's total length and 440–570 mm (17.2–22.5 in) in males and 540–700 mm (21.1–27.5 in) in females.

=== Voice ===
It is noisy when displaying. Its characteristic clicking call is omitted every 2–3 seconds and sounds to the human ear like two stones being knocked together.

== Distribution and habitat ==
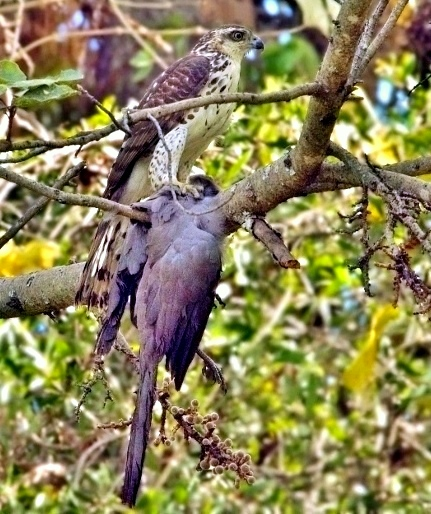
A juvenile with a grey go-away-bird

From the Western Cape of South Africa north to the southern Democratic Republic of Congo and through east Africa, Somalia to southern Ethiopia, including the islands of Mafia, Unguja (Zanzibar) and Pemba. It generally occurs in forest and diverse dense woodland in both lowland and montane areas, but it can also be found in riverine and gallery forest, plantations of exotic trees, parks and large gardens. It can occur in both moist and dry forest, even in isolated patches.

Size and plumage may vary between different habitats. African Goshawks that live in woodlands tend to be larger than forest dwellers. In forests, female African Goshawks tend to have similar colourful plumage to the males whereas, in woodlands, female African Goshawks camouflage better and have less colourful plumage. African Goshawks found in woodlands have more pronounced sexual dimorphism.

== Behaviour ==
The African goshawk typically soars above the canopy in the morning in a display flight involving slow wing beats interspersed with gliding, sometimes so high up that the only sign of the birds is its regular clicking call. Its main prey are birds up to the size of hornbills or francolins, but it also feeds on mammals, lizards and sometimes invertebrates. It is an ambush hunter, waiting on a perch until the prey is observed then swooping down to catch it. Pairs occasionally hunt co-operatively at large congregations of prey, such as bat roosts or weaver colonies.

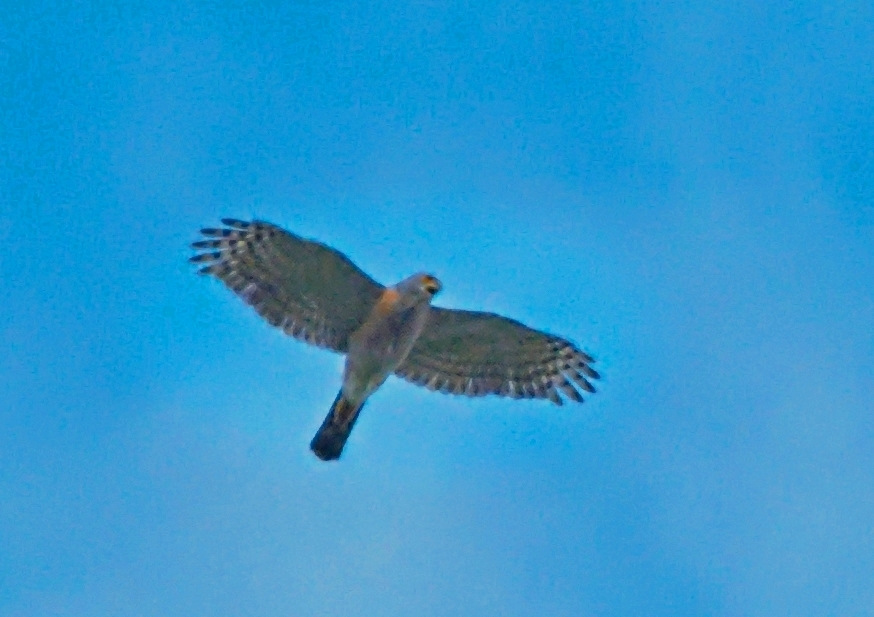
Adult calling in flight, Angola

=== Breeding ===
The African goshawk is territorial and the typical courtship display is performed by both sexes when they fly together in an undulated flight while calling loudly, sometimes finishing with a steep dive. The female builds the nest making a platform of sticks lined with fresh foliage, as well as pine needles, lichen and mistletoe. It is normally built on a branch away from the main trunk of a tree, as the species prefers to nest within dense foliage but the nest may also be constructed on top of an old hadeda ibis nest. African Goshawks have also been recorded taking over the nest of a little sparrowhawk (Tachyspiza minullus) instead of building their own. One to three eggs are laid in July–December, with a peak in September–November and are incubated mainly or solely by the female for about 35–37 days, while the male regularly brings food to her. The chicks are fed by both parents, fledging at about 30–35 days old but staying within the vicinity of the nest tree for another six weeks or so before becoming fully independent roughly 1–3 months after leaving the nest.

The species has been recorded as being preyed on by the black sparrowhawk (Accipiter melanoleuca), the tawny eagle (Aquila rapax), the Cape eagle-owl (Bubo capensis), the lanner falcon (Falco biarmicus) and the peregrine falcon (Falco peregrinus).
