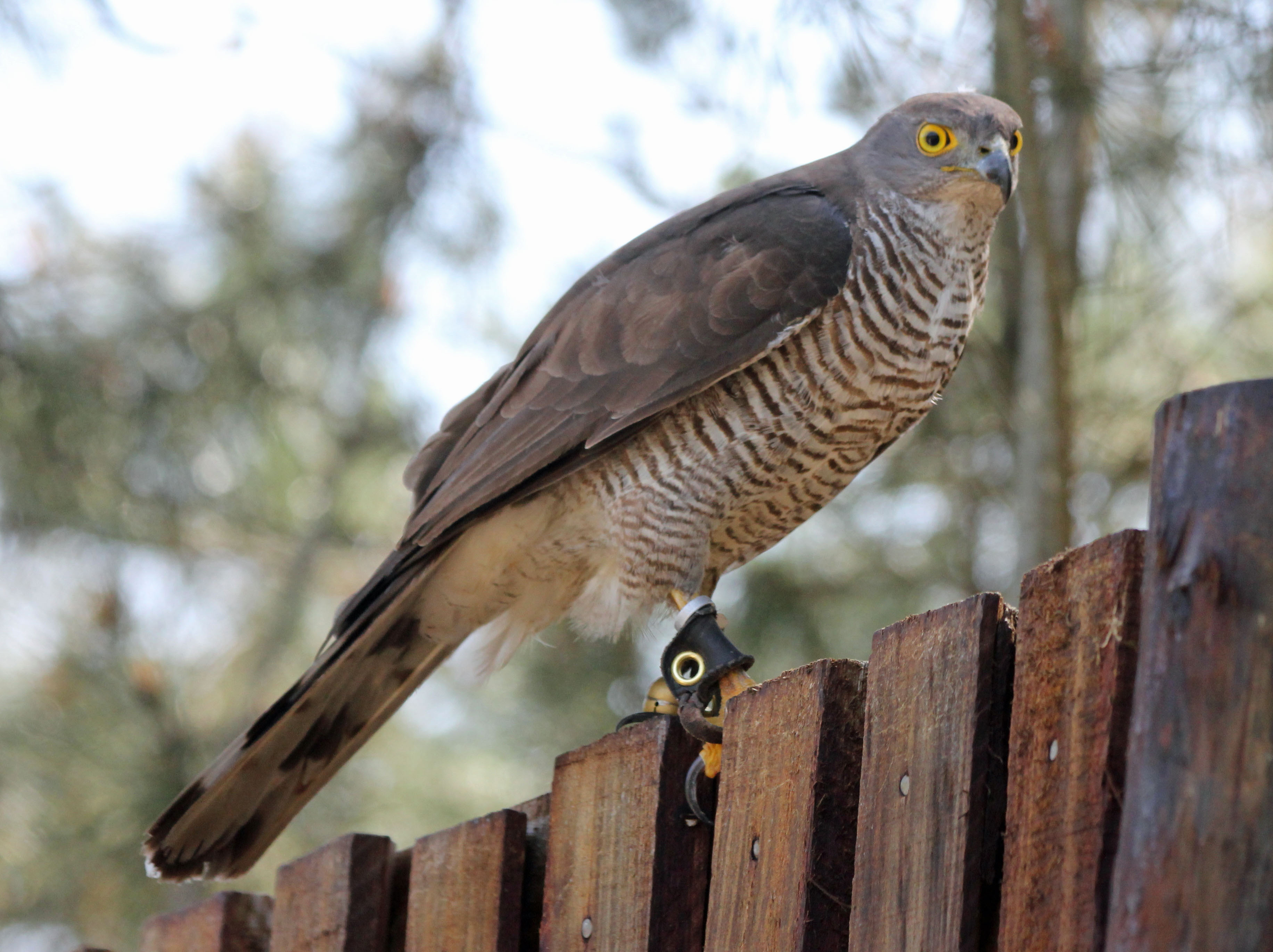
- Female African goshawk (Aerospiza tachiro)

Scientific classification
- Kingdom: Animalia
- Phylum: Chordata
- Class: Aves
- Order: Accipitriformes
- Family: Accipitridae
- Subfamily: Accipitrinae
- Genus: Aerospiza; Roberts, 1922

Type species
- Falco tachio Daudin, 1800

= Aerospiza =

Genus of birds

Aerospiza is a genus of goshawk and sparrowhawk in the family Accipitridae that are found in Africa. The two species in the genus were formerly placed in the genus Accipiter.

== Taxonomy ==
The genus Aerospiza was introduced in 1922 by the South African zoologist Austin Roberts with Falco tachio, Daudin, 1800 (the African goshawk) as the type species. The name combines the Ancient Greek αηρ (aēr), αερος (aeros) meaning "air" with σπιζιας (spizias) meaning "hawk". Species now placed in this genus were formerly assigned to the genus Accipiter. Molecular phylogenetic studies found that Accipiter was polyphyletic and in the subsequent rearrangement to create monophyletic genera, the genus Aerospiza was resurrected to contain two species that were previously placed in Accipiter.

The genus contains 2 species:

Genus Aerospiza – Roberts, 1922 – two species
Common name	Scientific name and subspecies	Range	Size and ecology	IUCN status and estimated population
African goshawk	Aerospiza tachiro (Daudin, 1800) Eight subspecies: A. t. macroscelides (Hartlaub, 1855); A. t. lopezi (Alexander, 1903); A. t. toussenelii (Verreaux, J & Verreaux, É & Des Murs, 1855); A. t. canescens (Chapin, 1921); A. t. unduliventer (Rüppell, 1836); A. t. sparsimfasciata (Reichenow, 1895); A. t. pembaensis (Benson & Elliott, HFI, 1975); A. t. tachiro (Daudin, 1800)	widespread across Africa	Size: Habitat: Diet:	LC
Chestnut-flanked sparrowhawk	Aerospiza castanilius (Bonaparte, 1853) Two subspecies: A. c. castanilius - (Bonaparte, 1853); A. c. beniensis - (Lönnberg, 1917)	west-central Africa	Size: Habitat: Diet:	LC
