= Earle E. Seaton =

Bermudian judge (1924–1993)

Earle Edward Seaton (1924–1993) was a jurist and a diplomat who collaborated with the Meru Representative and founder of TANU Japhet Nkura Kirilo(1921-1997) in the so-called Meru Land Case.

== Biography ==
Earle Seaton was born in Bermuda on 29 February 1924, the second of four children to Dudley and Eva Seaton, emigrants from St. Kitts. He was raised in Hamilton and graduated from Berkeley Institute as class Valedictorian in 1941. He excelled at the violin, earning spending money by playing for tourists at Bermuda hotels, and he also excelled at tennis. His tennis prowess earned him a full scholarship to Howard University in Washington, D.C. While at Howard, he became president of Howard University's chapter of Alpha Phi Alpha fraternity and he majored in Zoology. Also during his four years at Howard, Seaton met Alberta Jones from Texas who would later become his wife.

Although he wanted to become a doctor, his father persuaded him to study law and so Seaton enrolled at London University. At that time, pan-Africanism was gaining many adherents among Africans and West Indians from the myriad of European colonies. He learned Swahili and began a lifelong association with East Africans. He graduated from London University as a barrister and married Alberta Jones in 1948 (after she finished her doctoral dissertation in Biology at the University of Brussels).

The next year, the young married couple moved to the British colony of Tanganyika where he practised law. The year 1950 found him preparing to present a case at the United Nations in defence of the WaMeru people. Since Alberta was expecting their first child, he left her in Nairobi with Chief Koinange's senior wife. Alberta gave birth to a girl who they named Elizabeth.

In 1952 Earle Seaton, who was practising law in Moshi, Tanganyika, at the time, appeared before the United Nations Trusteeship Council to present the case of the Meru people, who had been evicted from their legally purchased land by order of the British colonial government, reportedly to turn it over to Europeans who were better equipped to work the land with modern methods. Though the British declared smaller numbers, the Meru reported 2,993 people were evicted and their livestock turned into the bush: 2,190 head of cattle, 8,984 sheep and goats, 325 donkeys, 333 dogs, 479 cats, and 1,896 chickens. After two hearings, all members of the Council chastised the British for their improper handling of the matter, but nonetheless upheld the eviction, saying that the Meru should be generously compensated for their loss.

After the birth of his second child, Dudley, in 1953 Seaton moved to Houston and then to Los Angeles in 1956. He was admitted to doctoral studies in International Affairs at the University of Southern California and completed his dissertation in 1961.

Once his dissertation was completed, he returned to Dar es Salaam to work in the Ministry of Foreign Affairs. After a few years, he was appointed by Mwalimu Julius Nyerere to serve as judge and later he served as Tanzania's Legal Counsel to the United Nations. In 1972, he became the first Black judge in Bermuda.

In collaboration with Kirilo Japhet, he authored The Meru Land Case, which described their groundbreaking effort in presenting the case of the Meru, the first time an indigenous people were to plead before the UN's Trusteeship Commission. (East African Publishing House, 1967) His other papers, written in collaboration with Dr. Giulio Pontecorvo, were concerning the Law of the Sea.

After serving from 1978 to 1989 as Chief Justice of Seychelles, Seaton returned to his wife's hometown of Houston, Texas in 1989. For two years he worked as an associate with a firm handling commercial reinsurance and commuted between Houston and Bermuda. He then travelled to Kampala to work for the British Commonwealth as an Appellate Judge in 1991.

In 1992, while en route to Houston, he suffered a heart attack and died in New York City. His memorial services at St. James Episcopal Church (Houston) and at St. Paul's A.M.E (Bermuda) were attended by the Honorable Mr. Hyera (Tanzania's Ambassador to the United States) by the Honorable Mr. Stanley Morton (Bermudian Member of Parliament).

== Positions held ==
- Ministry of Foreign Affairs, Tanzania 1961 – 1964
- Judge in Arusha, Tanzania 1965 – 1969
- Tanzania's Legal Counsel to the United Nations 1969 – 1971
- Puisne Justice of Bermuda 1972 – 1978
- Chief Justice of Seychelles 1978 – 1989
- Appellate Judge of Uganda 1991 – 1993
