= Elliott baronets =

Baronetcy in the Baronetage of the United Kingdom

The Elliott Baronetcy, of Limpsfield in the County of Surrey, was created in the Baronetage of the United Kingdom on 21 June 1917 for the civil servant Sir Thomas Elliott, KCB. He was Secretary to the Board of Agriculture and Fisheries from 1892 to 1913.

== Elliott baronets, of Limpsfield (1917) ==
- Sir Thomas Henry Elliott, KCB, 1st Baronet (1854–1926) Appointed a Companion of the Order of the Bath (CB) in 1897 and promoted to Knight Commander (KCB) in 1902.
- Sir Ivo D'Oyly Elliott, 2nd Baronet (1882–1961)
- Sir Hugh Francis Ivo Elliott, 3rd Baronet (1913–1989)
- Sir Clive Christopher Hugh Elliott, 4th Baronet (1945–2018)
- Sir Ivo Antony Moritz Elliott, 5th Baronet (born 1978)

The heir apparent is the current baronet's son Tristan H L Elliott (born 2016)
