= Alberta Jones Seaton =

American zoologist

- Born: Alberta Jones; December 31, 1924; Houston, Texas
- Died: April 4, 2014 (aged 89); Houston, Texas
- Education: Howard University; University of Brussels
- Known for: One of the first African-American women awarded a PhD in zoology
- Scientific career
- Fields: Embryology; Biology
- Workplaces: Wiley College; Makerere College; Spelman College; Texas Southern University

Alberta Jones Seaton (December 24, 1924 – April 4, 2014) was one of the first African-American women awarded a doctorate in zoology, in Belgium in 1949. She then moved to East Africa, where she and her husband became involved in African independence movements and she developed an academic career. Her husband, Earle Seaton, was an international lawyer and then jurist in several countries. Alberta Seaton later moved with her husband to Bermuda and the Seychelles, continuing to pursue an academic career. Alberta Seaton specialized in embryology, studying biological processes in the eggs of several species across her career, including early studies in morphogenesis. Born in Houston, she became a longterm professor of biology at Texas Southern University (TSU), where she also served as first chair of the Faculty Assembly and director of freshman studies. Seaton had two children, born in Kenya and Bermuda. She died in Houston in 2014.

== Early life, education and doctoral work ==
Alberta Jones was born in Houston, Texas on December 31, 1924. Her parents were Charles Alexander and Elizabeth (Polk) Jones. She graduated from Howard University with a bachelor science in zoology and chemistry in 1946. Jones spent the summer after graduation working at the Marine Biological Laboratory at Woods Hole, Massachusetts. She then earned her master's degree at Howard in 1947, studying with Tage U.H. Ellinger.

While at Howard, she met Earle Seaton, from Bermuda, who was also a Howard biology student. Both wanted to study further, but as the barriers for African-Americans pursuing post-graduate study were high in the United States in the 1940s, the couple went to Europe for further study. Few African-American women were able to gain PhDs in the US in the 1940s, with Roger Arliner Young becoming the first African-American woman to gain a PhD in zoology in 1940, and Mary Logan Reddick gaining a PhD in neuroembryology in 1944.

The couple married in London at Christmas 1948, where Earle Seaton studied to become a barrister. Alberta Seaton went to the University of Brussels to study with Albert Dalcq at the School of Embryology. Dalcq was the laboratory's director, and he was developing a theory of morphogenetic development in parallel with his student, Jean Pasteels.

Dalcq had been working with amphibian embryos. Seaton's project was to move to mammalian study by working on cytoplasmic RNA in rats and rabbits. Their work led to a "segregationist" theory, that was, according to a later director of the School, "long considered the most coherent interpretation of the differentiation of the two fundamental cell groups cell groups in the mammalian blastocyst". Seaton gained her doctorate in 1949, with a dissertation titled Etude de l'organisation cytoplasmique de l'oeuf des Rongeurs principalement quant à la Basophilie ribonucléique (A study of cytoplasmic basophily in the egg of the rat and some other mammals). She also studied the distribution of RNA in the rat ovum and morphogenesis.

== Career ==
In 1949, the Seatons became involved in the East African independence movement when they met Thomas Marealle from Tanganyika and Mbiyu Koinange, a Kenyan in exile, in London. Earle Seaton moved to Tanganyika as soon as he gained his legal qualification, and Alberta followed in 1949 after completing her doctoral work. Alberta was pregnant, and stayed with the senior wife of Chief Koinange (Mbiyu Koinange's father) in Nairobi until her baby was born. She then joined her husband to live in the Kilimanjaro-Meru region.

Seaton continued with her academic career and managed her family's homes in Tanzania and Houston, Texas, sometimes traveling with her husband. She taught periodically at Makerere University in Uganda, where she was a visiting professor of biology and embryology from 1952 to 1953, and at Wiley College in Texas. Seaton returned to the United States with her family in 1953, after the birth of her second child. Her husband decided to further his contribution to African freedom movements by undertaking doctoral studies in international affairs in 1953 at the University of Southern California, gaining his doctorate and returning to Tanganyika (soon to become Tanzania) in 1961.

From 1953 to 1954 Alberta Seaton was an assistant professor of biology at Spelman College in Atlanta. She also spent time as a research fellow at the California Institute of Technology (Caltech), studying antibodies and cell division in sea-urchin eggs.

From 1954 she was an associate professor at Texas Southern University (TSU) in Houston, becoming a full professor there in 1960 or 1961 until 1970. During the 1950s, she received several grants from the National Science Foundation for embryology studies. In 1965, she returned to Brussels for a year of study, with a National Science Foundation fellowship.

Seaton was the chair of the TSU's committee to develop its faculty manual from 1968 to 1970, as well as becoming the first Faculty Assembly chair from 1969 to 1971, and director of freshman studies in 1970. In 1971, Seaton published Laboratory exercises in vertebrate embryology. She was also a member of the American Association of University Professors conferences on curriculum improvement (1970–1972).

In 1972, Earle Seaton was the first black judge appointed to Bermuda's Supreme Court. Alberta Seaton left TSU in 1972, working in the Ministry of Education in Bermuda, and lecturing in biology at Bermuda College. In 1979, Earle Seaton was appointed Chief Justice of the Seychelles. From 1980 to 1989, Alberta Seaton was a consultant in the science section of the National Institute of Pedagogy in Victoria, Seychelles, publishing work on the zoology of the Seychelles. Seaton returned to a position of professor at TSU, from 1991 to 1995.

Seaton was a member of the American Association for the Advancement of Science (AAAS), the American Society of Zoologists, the American Association of University Women, Association Women in Science, Texas Academy of Sciences, Beta Kappa Chi, and Beta Beta Beta.

== Personal life ==
Seaton was Episcopalian. Alberta and Earle Seaton married in London in 1948, with a daughter, Elizabeth, born in Kenya in 1950, Chief. They also had a son, Dudley, born in Bermuda in 1953, who died in 1978.

Earle Seaton died of a heart attack in 1992 in New York City, when he was traveling on vacation from his last post as an Appelate judge in Uganda. Alberta Seaton died in Houston on April 4, 2014.
