= Sir Thomas Elliott, 1st Baronet =

British civil servant

Sir Thomas Elliott Bt KCB
- Born: Thomas Henry Elliott; 7 September 1854; London, England
- Died: 4 June 1926 (aged 71)
- Occupation: Civil servant

Sir Thomas Henry Elliott, 1st Baronet, KCB (7 September 1854 – 4 June 1926) was an English civil servant. Having entered the Inland Revenue Department in 1872, he rose to be permanent secretary to the Board of Agriculture and Fisheries (1892–1913), and Deputy Master and Comptroller of the Royal Mint (1913–1917).

== Biography ==
Elliott was born on 7 September 1854 in London, England. He sat the civil service exam on 2 January 1872, and passed in first place. He served as private secretary to C. T. Richie between 1889 and 1892. In January 1892, he was appointed Secretary to the Board of Agriculture and Fisheries. He was the British Delegate to the International Institute of Agriculture from 1905. In January 1913, he was appointed Deputy Master and Comptroller of the Royal Mint: as the Master of the Mint was a title held by the Chancellor of the Exchequer, the deputy master was in charge of the day-to-day running of the Mint. He was additionally made ex officio Engraver of His Majesty's Seals in March 1913. He retired from the civil service in 1917.

In 1880, Elliott married Ellen, daughter of late James Rowe. Together they had two children; one son and one daughter. Elliott died on 4 June 1926, aged 71.

=== Honours ===
In the 1897 Diamond Jubilee Honours, Elliott was appointed a Companion of the Order of the Bath (CB). In the 1902 Coronation Honours, he was promoted to Knight Commander of the Order of the Bath (KCB) and therefore granted the title "sir". In October 1917, upon retirement from the civil service, he was made a baronet in the Baronetage of the United Kingdom as Sir Thomas Henry Elliott, 1st Baronet, of Limpsfield, in the county of Surrey.

In addition to his British honours, Elliott was awarded a number of foreign ones. He was made Commander of the Order du Mérite Agricole and Officier de l'Instruction Publique by the French president. He was also made Commander of the Order of the Crown (Belgium), and Commander of the Order of Saints Maurice and Lazarus by the King of Italy.

Government offices
Preceded by Sir George Leach	Permanent Secretary of the Board of Agriculture (Board of Agriculture and Fisheries after 1903); 1892–1913	Succeeded by Sir Sydney Oliver
Peerage of the United Kingdom
New creation	Baronet (of Limpsfield); 1917–1926	Succeeded by Ivo Elliott
