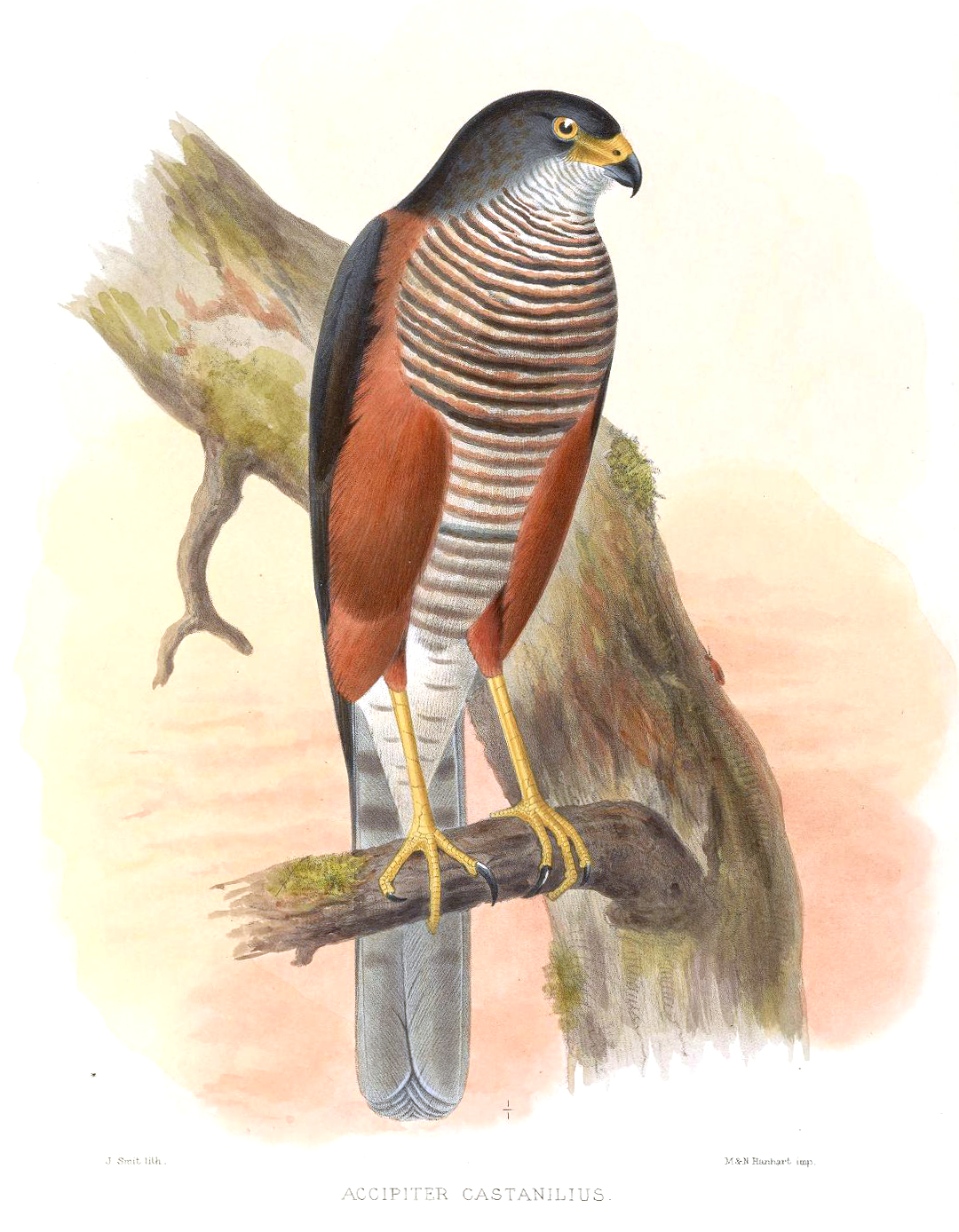

Conservation status
- Least Concern (IUCN 3.1)

Scientific classification
- Kingdom: Animalia
- Phylum: Chordata
- Class: Aves
- Order: Accipitriformes
- Family: Accipitridae
- Genus: Aerospiza
- Species: A. castanilius

Binomial name
- Aerospiza castanilius (Bonaparte, 1853)

Subspecies
- A. c. castanilius - (Bonaparte, 1853); A. c. beniensis - (Lönnberg, 1917)

= Chestnut-flanked sparrowhawk =

Species of bird

The chestnut-flanked sparrowhawk (Aerospiza castanilius) is a small west African species of sparrowhawk in the family Accipitridae. This species was formerly placed in the genus Accipiter.

== Taxonomy ==
It is closely related to the African goshawk Aerospiza tachiro, albeit smaller than this species. It is normally regarded as monotypic, although some authorities recognise the smaller birds in the Congo Basin as the subspecies Aerospiza castanilius beniensis.

== Description ==
The chestnut-flanked sparrowhawk has blackish-grey upperparts with a very distinctive pattern on the underparts; the breast and belly are heavily barred grey and brown, with chestnut-colored flanks. The throat is white, and the head is rather broad compared to similar species. The cere is yellow, as is the thin eyering which surrounds the red eye. Females and juveniles are browner. They stand 25 cm (9.8 in) tall and have a wingspan of 60 cm (24 in).

== Distribution and habitat ==
The chestnut-flanked sparrowhawk occurs in west central Africa from southern Nigeria through Cameroon and Gabon to Democratic Republic of Congo. It is said to occur in the Upper Guinean forests west of Nigeria but this has not been confirmed. It is found mainly in lowland tropical rainforest, mainly in the middle storey but it can adapt to dense secondary growth and will approach habitation in the forest. It is found up to 750 m (2,460 ft) above sea level.

== Behaviour ==
The habits of the chestnut-flanked sparrowhawk are poorly known but it is known to lay eggs during January to April in Gabon. It probably feeds mainly on birds but has been recorded catching bats. As it is rarely seen in the open it is presumed to be a still hunter which sits in the cover of foliage and sallies out to catch prey. Has been known to enter houses after poultry and to follow driver ant columns to ambush the attendant small birds.
