= Clive Elliott =

British ornithologist and international civil servant

Sir Clive Christopher Hugh Elliott Bt
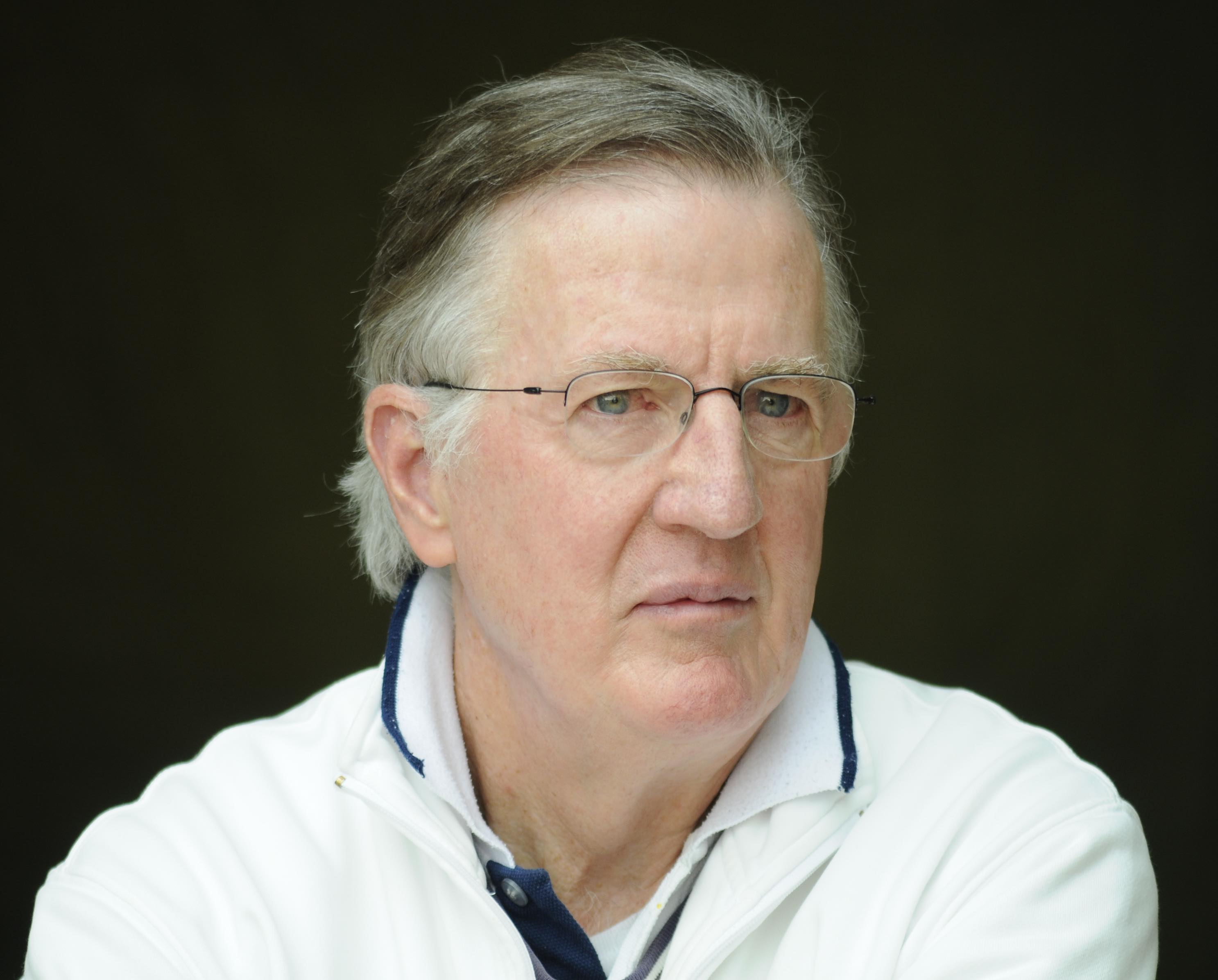
- Sir Clive Christopher Hugh Elliott Photo: M.-T. Elliott
- Born: Clive Christopher Hugh Elliott; 12 August 1945; Moshi, Tanganyika (Tanzania)
- Died: 18 April 2018 (aged 72); South Leigh, Oxfordshire, UK
- Education: Dragon School; Bryanston School
- Alma mater: University College, Oxford
- Occupations: International civil servant, ornithologist
- Known for: Migratory pest control, ornithology
- Notable work: Quelea Quelea Africa’s Bird pest
- Spouse: Marie-Thérèse Rüttimann
- Children: Ivo Elliott, Nico Elliott
- Parent(s): Sir Hugh Francis Ivo Elliott; Elizabeth Margaret Phillipson

Sir Clive Christopher Hugh Elliott, 4th Baronet (12 August 1945 – 18 April 2018) was a British ornithologist and civil servant.

== Biography ==
Elliott was born in Moshi, Tanganyika Territory on 12 August 1945. He father, Sir Hugh Elliott, was stationed there as a civil servant in the colonial administration. During Clive's childhood, from 1951 to 1953, he accompanied his parents to Tristan da Cunha, where his father was seconded as the first Administrator. The wild-life and abundance of sea birds on the island, together with the presence of the eminent ornithologists Bunty and Berthus Rowan, and of his own ornithologist father, made a deep impression on him in this formative period of his life. Afterwards, he attended the Dragon School, Oxford, returning to his parents in Dar es Salaam, Tanganyika during vacations. His familiarity with Swahili, acquired in Tanganyika before its transition in 1961 to the independent state Tanzania, was to prove invaluable later on in his work in Africa. After the Dragon School he continued his education at Bryanston. Later he went on to University College, Oxford, where he read zoology, specializing in ornithology. On graduating with his BA degree, he pursued his ornithological studies at the FitzPatrick Institute at the University of Cape Town, with research into the Cape Weaver Ploceus capensis. He was awarded the degree of PhD in Zoology in 1973.

In 1975 he joined the Food and Agriculture Organization of the United Nations (FAO) to work in Chad as a research scientist with the mission to investigate the control of the migratory passerine pest, the Red-billed Quelea, Quelea quelea. This species is endemic throughout semi-arid zones of sub-Saharan Africa and inflicts widespread damage to cereal crops. Much of his work was accordingly devoted to field trips over many parts of northern and western Africa.

In 1978, with the outbreak of civil war in Chad, Clive and his wife Marie-Thérèse Rüttiman moved to Arusha, Tanzania, where he was appointed to a new position with the FAO, with the mandate to continue working on Quelea throughout eastern Africa. In 1986 he was appointed Project manager of the Bird Control Unit at the FAO and he and his family moved to Nairobi.

In 1989 he was appointed to the Agricultural Operations Division of the FAO in Rome, and in 1995, promoted to the position of Senior Officer, Migratory Pests Plant Protection Service. Although this post was based in Rome, it involved numerous field trips and overseeing projects intended to control migratory pests such as the locust, armyworm, and Quelea. He authored and co-authored several publications on pest control in Africa, including a study based on satellite sensing data.

In 2006 Clive retired to Oxfordshire, where he continued to undertake ornithological projects for the FAO and remained active as a consultant and a recognized authority on African bird pests. He was President of the Oxford Ornithology Society, and member of the committee of the Tristan da Cunha Association.

As a competitive tennis player, he was also a member of the Committee of the North Oxford Tennis Club. While he was still working in Chad, he had won the men's singles tennis championship there in 1978. At the outbreak of the civil war, as reigning champion, he brought the trophy for safekeeping back to his home in England. Once, after a couple of days’ absence to undergo a series of minor skin operations, he returned to his FAO office in Rome with a row of stitches on his head, announcing to his appalled staff that he had just undergone major brain surgery.

Baronetage of Great Britain
Preceded by Hugh Elliott	Baronet (of Limpsfield); 1989–2018	Succeeded by Ivo Elliott
