= United Tanganyika Party =

1956–1962 political party in Tanganyika

United Tanganyika Party (UTP) was a political party in Tanganyika. It was established by the British governor Edward Twining in 1956 as a counter to the Tanganyika African National Union (TANU), an African nationalist party led by Julius Nyerere. The UTP was a multi-racial party that included all of the white members of the Legislative Council as well as a majority of the Asian members and around half of the black African members. Twining did not intend that the UTP would defeat TANU in elections, which he considered impossible, but that it should be used as a tool to pressure Nyerere into an agreement over independence. The UTP argued against independence at the United Nations.

Despite the UTP, TANU won a majority of European and Asian seats and all of the African seats in elections held in September 1958 and February 1959. They repeated this success in the 1960 elections winning 70 out of 71 seats. The UTP was considered "virtually defunct" by 1961 and was dissolved some time after 1962.

== Background ==
The United Tanganyika Party (UTP) was established by the British governor of Tanganyika, Edward Twining, in 1956 as a counterweight to the African nationalist party, the Tanganyika African National Union (TANU). Twining convinced all of the European members of the Legislative Council, most of the Asian members and around half of the (black) African members to join the party. Twining intended not that the party should defeat TANU, which he considered impossible, but that it should force its leader, Julius Nyerere to come to an agreement over independence. The UTP's executive director was a former Conservative Party official.

The party received financial support from British companies with operations in Tanganyika and the British authorities made no secret of their political support for the party, praising its multi-racial approach over TANU's focus on Africans. Key members of Tanganyika's Asian community also supported the UTP, as they considered the territory was not viable for independence for a further 25 years.

The UTP was initially supported by the Americans who thought it might be popular with the African elite, who felt threatened by TANU's populist approach. The UTP was successful in attracting several tribal chiefs as members. By April 1956 the American approach changed after TANU successfully portrayed the UTP as a party of the British government.

== Political actions ==
In 1956, Nyerere travelled to the United Nations (UN) to argue for an end to the UN trusteeship over Tanganyika, which was administered by Britain. The UTP sent a party to the UN to argue against independence.

While the British Colonial Office thought of Nyerere as a moderate that they could work with, the Tanganyikan authorities and the UTP considered him unsuitable. Nyerere was charged with criminal libel and forbidden to speak in public. When this failed to silence Nyerere Twining changed his stance and tried to work with him.

== Electoral performance ==
In 1957, laws were passed permitting the first elections in Tanganyika. These were held in September 1958 and February 1959, with separate constituencies for European, Asian and African voters. TANU under Nyerere won all the African seats and a majority of the other seats. TANU repeated this success at the 1960 elections, held with a larger franchise, winning 70 out of 71 seats. In May 1961, Nyerere became prime minister and a date was set for independence, 9 December 1961.

The UTP was considered "virtually defunct" by 1961 and was dissolved after 1962.
