= Sophia Mustafa =

Indian-born teacher and Kenyan politician (1922–2005)

Sophia Mustafa (1922 – 1 September 2005) was a writer and politician of Kashmiri descent.

== Life ==
Mustafa was born Sophia Butt in India but grew up in Nairobi. She married Abdulla Mustafa, a lawyer, and moved with him to Arusha, Tanganyika in 1948. The couple later moved to Dar es Salaam. She fought alongside Julius Nyerere for the country's independence. In 1958, she was elected to the Legislative Council of Tanganyika for the Arusha District as a member of TANU. She served in the country's parliament (the country later became Tanzania) until 1965 when her husband was called to the bench.

She was among the earliest non-white female legislators on the continent. The small number of precedents included Mabel Dove Danquah (Gold Coast, 1954), Senedu Gebru (Ethiopia, 1957), and Ella Koblo Gulama (Sierra Leone, 1957).

In 1961 her memoir, The Tanganyika Way (OCLC 563174097) was published.

In 1989, she moved to Canada with her husband, settling in Brampton. Mustafa published a novel In the Shadow of Kirinyaga in 2002 (ISBN 9781894770033). She died in Brampton in 2005. A second novel The Broken Reed was published posthumously in the same year (ISBN 9789987411177).

== Scholarship on Mustafa ==
Recent scholarship has examined Mustafa's work in relation to Partition, migration, and memory. Doctoral research by Sana Asif analyzes her fiction through the frameworks of feminist geography and memory studies, situating it alongside other Muslim women's Partition narratives that reconfigure spaces of home, city, and nation in times of displacement and trauma.
