= 1962 Tanganyikan presidential election =

Presidential election in Tanganyika

- 1 November 1962
- Presidential election
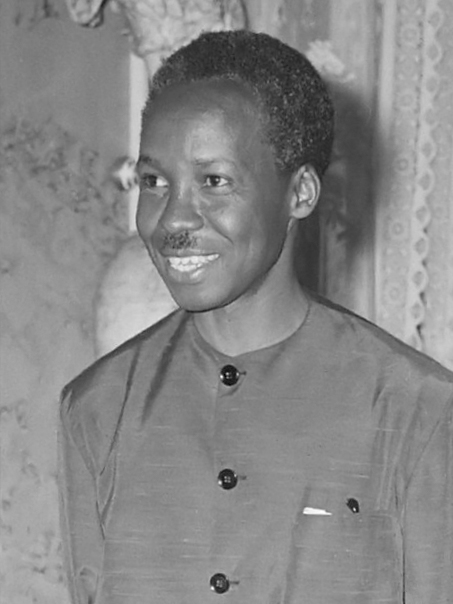

Nominee	Julius Nyerere	Zuberi Mtemvu
Party	TANU	ANC
Popular vote	1,127,987	21.276
Percentage	98.15%	1.85%
- Results by region
President before election
Elizabeth II
as Queen
Elected President
Julius Nyerere
TANU

Presidential elections were held in Tanganyika on 1 November 1962. They were the first elections following independence the previous year and the decision to form a republic. Julius Nyerere, leader of the ruling Tanganyika African National Union and incumbent Prime Minister won easily with 98.15% of the vote.

The vote share of more than 98% for Nyerere remains to this day the highest percentage of votes obtained by any candidate in Tanzania, even though it was ironically the only election in which he faced a rival. No further multi-party elections were held until 1995.

== Results ==
Candidate	Party	Votes	%
Julius Nyerere	Tanganyika African National Union	1,127,987	98.15
Zuberi Mtemvu	African National Congress	21,276	1.85
Total		1,149,263	100.00
Source: Nohlen et al.

There were around 1.8 million registered voters.
