= George Leach (cricketer) =

English cricketer

George Leach (18 July 1881 – 10 January 1945) was an English cricketer active from 1903 to 1914 who played for Sussex. He was born in Malta and died in Rawtenstall. He appeared in 226 first-class matches as a righthanded batsman who bowled right arm fast. He scored 5,870 runs with a highest score of 113 not out and took 413 wickets with a best performance of eight for 48. George Leach was a summer cricketer for Sussex and played for both Tottenham Hotspurs and Brighton & Hove Albion in the early 1900s as a centre forward.

Having joined from Hailsham Leach played at Brighton & Hove Albion for a short while before joining Spurs in 1905, coming in to add some physical presence, but only made the team on seven occasions (two in the Southern League and five in the Western League) in his first season scoring 3 goals and then failed to make the first eleven appearances again in a senior game. The rest of his appearances were in friendlies.

It was unsurprising that without much opportunity to play, Tottenham released him in April 1907 and he later re-signed with the Seagulls.

A useful right hand batsman and a right arm fast bowler, George represented Sussex at county cricket with distinction between 1903 and 1912, playing 226 matches and scoring runs at an average of 18.93, while taking over 400 wickets at an average of 27.94. In 1917, he was selected for Captain Harwood's England XI.

George Leach died in Rowtenstall, Lancashire on 10 January 1945.
