= George Leach (civil servant) =

English civil servant

Lieutenant Colonel Sir George Archibald Leach, KCB (25 April 1820 – 18 June 1913) was an English civil servant.

Leach entered the Royal Engineers in 1837 and retired on half-pay in 1861 with the rank of lieutenant colonel. From 1854 to 1861, he was in charge of the Irish Survey for the Ordnance Survey. He was appointed an assistant tithe commissioner in 1861, full commissioner in 1877 and then a Land Commissioner from 1882. On the establishment of the Board of Agriculture in 1889, he became its Permanent Secretary, serving until 1892. His uncle was the judge Sir John Leach; his sons included the army officers Sir Edward Pemberton Leach and Harold Pemberton Leach and his daughter married Sir Joseph Savory. On Leach's death, he was described by The Daily Telegraph as a "veteran official". He was also a keen yachtsman and vice-president of the Royal Yacht Racing Association.

Government offices
Preceded by office established	Permanent Secretary of the Board of Agriculture; 1889–1892	Succeeded by Sir Thomas Elliott, 1st Baronet
