= 1960 Tanganyikan general election =

Election of the Tanganyika African National Union to the Legislative Council

General elections were held in Tanganyika on 30 August 1960, following the agreement of the United Kingdom to establish internal self-government for the territory. The Tanganyika African National Union won 70 of the 71 elected seats, whilst the other went to a TANU member who had stood against the official TANU candidate, and immediately joined TANU faction after being elected.

== Results ==
Party	Votes	%	Seats
Tanganyika African National Union	100,581	82.82	70
African National Congress	337	0.28	0
Independents	20,527	16.90	1
Total	121,445	100.00	71
Registered voters/turnout	885,000	–	
Source: Nohlen et al.
