= Lady Marion Chesham =

Tanzanian politician

Marion Caher Donoghue, Lady Chesham (1903–1973), was a prominent figure in Tanzanian politics during the 1950s and 1960s before her retirement in 1972.

== Early life ==
Marion Donoghue was born in Philadelphia. She was the daughter of Daniel Charles Donoghue.

== Marriages ==
Lady Marion Chesham was married three times. Her first marriage was to Brook Edwards, with whom she had a daughter named Mary. Following her divorce from Edwards, Marion married Theobald Walter Somerset Henry Butler, 8th Earl of Carrick and became the Countess of Carrick. This union also ended in divorce. In October 1938, she married John Compton Cavendish, 4th Baron Chesham. From this point onward, her title was Lady Chesham.

== Politics ==
Lady Marion Chesham served with the Auxiliary Territorial Service and the American Red Cross during the Second World War. Following the death of Lord Chesham in 1952, she became a prominent spokesperson for the Capricorn Africa Society - a pressure group based in the British colonies in southern and eastern Africa, which included members from a range of cultural backgrounds. She was a member of the Tanganyika Legislative Council between 1958 and 1962. She then went on to become a member of the Tanzanian National Assembly until the union of Tanganyika with Zanzibar in 1964.

== Death ==
Lady Marion Chesham retired in 1972 and died in Guildford, England in 1973.
