= Fundikira III =

Abdallah Said Fundikira III (2 February 1921 – 6 August 2007) was the Ntemi (chief) of Unyanyembe 1957–1962/2007, when he was deposed by the Tanzanian government. He died as a member of the Chama Cha Mapinduzi party.

== Early life ==
Fundikira attended his primary education at Tanga Primary School. He undertook middle school education at the same school and later joined Tabora School for secondary education where he graduated in 1939. Fundikira joined Makerere University in Uganda from 1940 to 1946 and was conferred with a first degree in Agriculture. In 1957, he was ordained as chief of the Nyamwezi in the Nyanyembe chiefdom.

In 1961 soon after independence, the first Chief Minister Julius Nyerere appointed Fundikira as minister for water, a portfolio he served for one year. He was appointed the first local justice minister when Tanganyika became a republic in 1962. He resigned from the Cabinet in 1963 to protest the imminent legislation introducing a one party state.

In 1964, he resigned from the civil service. In 1967, he was appointed as board chairman of the defunct East African Airways until 1972 when his term of office came to an end.

Fundikira continued running private business until 1990, when he spearheaded the debate on multipartism in Tanzania in collaboration with other politicians such as the late Kassanga Tumbo, Prince Bagenda, Mabere Marando, Ndimara Tegambwage, when they formed a national political reform committee (NCCR).

In 1993, soon after the birth of multiparty democracy in the country, Fundikira formed the UMD party and took part in the 1995 presidential election in which CCM emerged victorious, with Benjamin Mkapa being announced as the winner.

He held the party's top leadership post until 1999 when he crossed over to CCM. After the 2000 general elections, President Mkapa appointed him a nominated MP until 2005. He remained a CCM member until his death.

According to the Nyamwezi tradition, the burial of a chief should be conducted at night but, in this case, Fundikira will be buried at 6.00pm just before sun set.

== Fundikira: The long journey ==
He was among the first Ministers in the Uhuru cabinet, having served as Justice Minister. Fundikira hailed from a family of Nyamwezi chiefs but lost his title after founding President Mwalimu Julius Nyerere scrapped the chiefdoms set up in the country.

However efforts were made by the Uhuru Government to incorporate tribal leaders, such as himself in the Government system. Such were gestures of goodwill meant to strengthen national unity above tribal inclinations.

In 1961, he became president of the East African Muslim Welfare Society, an organisation of a few Muslims, which sought better access to education.

The organisation was founded in 1945 by the Aga Khan with the aim of promoting Islam and raising the standard of living for East African Muslims.

As the country headed back towards the road to multi party politics, Fundikira played a pivotal role in organising the opposition by chairing the first interim structure of an opposition umbrella body under the name National Committee for Constitutional Reforms.

He later formed his own party, the Union for Multiparty Democracy, but latter shifted camp to the ruling party, Chama Cha Mapinduzi.

In 2005, Fundikira was nominated as Member of Parliament by former President Benjamin Mkapa along with a host of others, including Makongoro Nyerere and Anne Kilango of CCM.

Fundikira died on 6 August 2007 in his sleep.
