= Barbro Cecilia Johansson =

Swedish-Tanzanian missionary (1912–1999)

Barbro Cecilia Johansson (September 25, 1912 – 7 December 1999) was a Swedish-Tanzanian missionary.

She was born in St. John's Parish Malmö, the third largest city in Sweden on September 12, 1912. Johansson was the daughter of Anders Johansson and school teacher Betzy Persson Hussénius. After studying to become a teacher in Sweden, she traveled in 1946 to Tanzania (formerly known as Tanganyika) to serve in the Church of Sweden (the Evangelical Lutheran Swedish state church). While she was at her post in Tanzania, she facilitated construction of a girls' school in Kashasha, Bukoba in 1949, and was elected to join the country's parliament in 1959 as Mwanza's constituency representative and member of the Tanganyika African National Union (TANU) party, which later merged with the Chama Cha Mapinduzi party. Later she became a substantive minister in the Tanzanian Government.

She was also the headmaster of a girls' school, adviser to Tanzania's ambassador in Sweden, board member of Dar es-Salaam University and constantly active in improving adult education. Over time, she became a close friend of President Julius Nyerere. She also appeared for the liberation movement in the rest of southern Africa, such as the African National Congress. She received an honorary doctorate from University of Gothenburg in 1968 and was awarded the Illis quorum in 1990.
