= African National Congress (Tanganyika) =

Political party in Tanganyika

Tanganyika African National Union
- Leader: Zuberi Mtemvu
- Founded: 1958

African National Congress (Tanganyika) was a political party in Tanganyika. It was established in June 1958, breaking from the Tanganyika African National Union. Zuberi Mtemvu was one of the key leaders.
