= Zuberi Mtemvu =

Politician in Tanganyika

Alhaji Zuberi Mwinshehe Manga Mtemvu (1928 - 20 September 1998) was a politician and one of the freedom fighters from Tanganyika in the years 1950. Zuberi Mtemvu was among the first members of TANU. He resigned from his employment to be involved fully in his political party.

In 1958, he split from TANU to form a splinter group called the African National Congress to protest Julius Nyerere's moderate policies, and opening TANU membership up to non-Africans in particular. Mtemvu supported a policy of "Africa for the African only", called for the Africanisation of the civil service, and took a racialist stance on citizenship for non-Africans. The ANC was not popular and had no support base. Mtemvu ran in the 1962 Tanganyikan presidential election, the only multiparty election held until the end of the 20th century, but was defeated by Julius Nyerere who won 98.15% of the vote.
